= List of Playboy Playmates of 1969 =

The following is a list of Playboy Playmates of 1969, the 15th anniversary year of the publication. Playboy magazine names their Playmate of the Month each month throughout the year.

== January ==
Leslie Bianchini

Playboy centerfold appearance
- January 1969

Personal details
- Born: February 12, 1947 (age 79) Chicago, Illinois, U.S.
- Height: 5 ft 7 in (1.70 m)

Leslie Bianchini (born February 12, 1947) was Playboy magazine's Playmate of the Month for its January 1969 issue. Her centerfold was photographed by Mario Casilli.

In 1994, it became known that Bianchini's centerfold photo (along with Angela Dorian, Reagan Wilson, and Cynthia Myers) was scanned and inserted into Apollo 12 extra-vehicular activity astronaut cuff checklists by pranksters at NASA.

== February ==
Lorrie Menconi
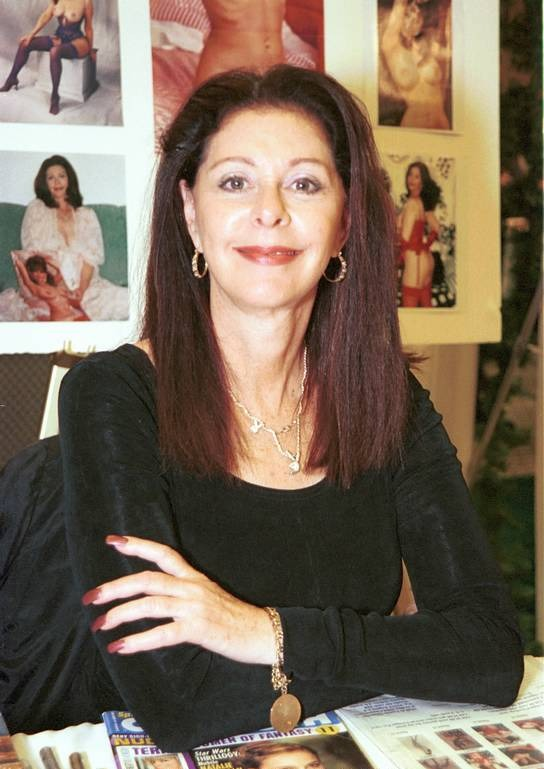

Playboy centerfold appearance
- February 1969

Personal details
- Born: February 24, 1948 (age 78) Philadelphia, Pennsylvania, U.S.
- Height: 5 ft 6 in (1.68 m)

Lorrie Menconi (born February 24, 1948, in Philadelphia, PA) was Playboy magazine's Playmate of the Month for its February 1969 issue. Her centerfold was photographed by William Figge and Ed DeLong.

Lorrie was one of several Playmates who were pregnant at the time of her shoot. This was not mentioned in her Playmate article, nor was it mentioned that she was married, both common occurrences at the time when biographical details about Playmates were obscured or enhanced by the magazine.

Lorrie raised four children. One of her children is Ashlee Ricci, also a Playboy model. Lorrie attends Glamourcon events with her daughter.

== March ==
Kathy MacDonald

Playboy centerfold appearance
- March 1969

Personal details
- Born: December 7, 1946 (age 79) New Jersey, U.S.
- Height: 5 ft 4.5 in (1.64 m)

Kathy MacDonald (born December 7, 1946, in New Jersey) was Playboy magazine's Playmate of the Month for its March 1969 issue. Her centerfold was photographed by David Chan.

== April ==
Lorna Hopper

Playboy centerfold appearance
- April 1969

Personal details
- Born: August 31, 1950 (age 75) Houston, Texas, U.S.
- Height: 5 ft 4 in (1.63 m)

Lorna Hopper (born August 31, 1950, in Houston, Texas) was Playboy magazine's Playmate of the Month for the April 1969 issue. Her centerfold was photographed by William Figge and Ed DeLong.

== May ==
Sally Sheffield

Playboy centerfold appearance
- May 1969

Personal details
- Born: June 17, 1941 (age 84) Brooklyn, New York
- Height: 5 ft 4 in (1.63 m)

Sally Sheffield (born June 17, 1941, in Brooklyn, New York) was Playboy magazine's Playmate of the Month for the May 1969 issue. Her centerfold was photographed by Pompeo Posar, who later remarked, "Sally was an interesting lady, so smart". A younger sister, Anita Sheffield, also did some nude modeling.

== June ==
Helena Antonaccio

Playboy centerfold appearance
- June 1969

Personal details
- Born: March 21, 1949 (age 77) Morristown, New Jersey
- Height: 5 ft 3 in (1.60 m)

Helena Antonaccio (born March 21, 1949, in Morristown, New Jersey) was Playboy magazine's Playmate of the Month for the June 1969 issue. Her centerfold was photographed by Pompeo Posar. She was also a Playboy Bunny at the New York club.

== July ==
Nancy McNeil

Playboy centerfold appearance
- July 1969

Personal details
- Born: December 13, 1947 (age 78) Los Angeles, California, U.S.
- Height: 5 ft 2 in (1.57 m)

Nancy McNeil (born December 13, 1947, in Los Angeles) was Playboy magazine's Playmate of the Month for the July 1969 issue. Her centerfold was photographed by William Figge and Ed Delong. Nancy worked for Figge and his wife Mel for a time after she posed for them for Playboy.

== August ==
Debbie Hooper

Playboy centerfold appearance
- August 1969

Personal details
- Born: January 24, 1948 (age 78) Cleveland, Ohio, U.S.
- Height: 5 ft 3 in (1.60 m)

Debbie Hooper (born January 24, 1948, in Cleveland, Ohio) was Playboy magazine's Playmate of the Month for the August 1969 issue. Her centerfold was photographed by Mario Casilli.

According to The Playmate Book, Debbie went into television commercial production following her Playboy appearance.

== September ==
Shay Knuth

Playboy centerfold appearance
- September 1969

Personal details
- Born: May 29, 1945 (age 80) Milwaukee, Wisconsin, U.S.
- Height: 5 ft 3 in (1.60 m)

Shay Knuth (born May 29, 1945, in Milwaukee, Wisconsin) was Playboy magazine's Playmate of the Month for September 1969. Her centerfold was photographed by Dwight Hooker. At the time of the photo shoot, she was studying sociology at the University of Wisconsin–Madison and working as a Bunny at the Playboy Resort in Lake Geneva, Wisconsin.

Knuth later appeared on the covers of the January 1970 and December 1970 issues of Playboy as well as a "Playmates Forever" pictorial in the April 1984 issue. She also worked as a Bunny at the San Francisco and London Playboy Clubs and as the "Official Party Coordinator" for Studio 54.

As of 2009 Knuth lived in Chicago and was appearing at "glamour conventions".

== October ==
Jean Bell

Playboy centerfold appearance
- October 1969

Personal details
- Born: November 23, 1944 (age 81) St. Louis, Missouri, U.S.
- Height: 5 ft 4 in (1.63 m)

Jean Bell (born Annie Lee Morgan on November 23, 1944, in St. Louis, Missouri) was one of the first of Playboy magazine's African American Playmates of the Month.

When she appeared in the October 1969 issue of Playboy, Bell was only the second African American woman to appear as the centerfold (the first was Jennifer Jackson, in March 1965). Her centerfold was photographed by Don Klumpp. A few months later, Bell became the first black person to appear on the magazine's cover. Bell was featured with four other playmates in the January 1970 cover of the magazine.

After Bell's appearance in Playboy, she enjoyed a brief acting career, working on such films as Mean Streets and The Klansman, sometimes credited as Jeanne Bell. She posed nude again for Playboy in the December 1979 pictorial "Playmates Forever!"

== November ==
Claudia Jennings

Playboy centerfold appearance
- November 1969

Playboy Playmate of the Year
- 1970
- Preceded by: Connie Kreski
- Succeeded by: Sharon Clark

Personal details
- Born: December 20, 1949 Saint Paul, Minnesota, U.S.
- Died: October 3, 1979 (aged 29)
- Height: 5 ft 6 in (1.68 m)

Claudia Jennings (born Mary Eileen Chesterton, December 20, 1949, Saint Paul, Minnesota – died October 3, 1979, Malibu, California) was an American model and actress. Jennings is Playboy magazine's Playmate of the Month for November 1969 and also became Playmate of the Year for 1970. Her original pictorial was photographed by Pompeo Posar.

Jennings had been a receptionist at Playboy before posing for the magazine. After her appearances in Playboy, Jennings became an actress in 1970s "drive-in" movies and in television. In 1973, she had a guest appearance on The Brady Bunch.

Early in the morning of October 3, 1979, Jennings died in a car accident when a van hit her while she was driving her Volkswagen Beetle convertible. She was 29 years old.

== December ==
Gloria Root

Playboy centerfold appearance
- December 1969

Personal details
- Born: May 28, 1948 Chicago, Illinois, United States
- Died: January 8, 2006 (aged 57) San Francisco, California, United States
- Height: 5 ft 2 in (1.57 m)

Gloria Root (May 28, 1948 in Chicago – January 8, 2006 in San Francisco) was Playboy magazine's Playmate of the Month for the December 1969 issue. Her centerfold was photographed by Pompeo Posar.

== See also ==
- List of people in Playboy 1960–1969

Leslie Bianchini	Lorrie Menconi	Kathy MacDonald	Lorna Hopper	Sally Sheffield	Helena Antonaccio
Nancy McNeil	Debbie Hooper	Shay Knuth	Jean Bell	Claudia Jennings	Gloria Root
