= List of Playboy Playmates of 1966 =

The following is a list of Playboy Playmates of 1966. Playboy magazine names their Playmate of the Month each month throughout the year.

== January ==
Judy Tyler

Personal details
- Born: December 24, 1947 Los Angeles, California, United States
- Died: June 18, 2013 (aged 65) Died from complications of open heart surgery.
- Height: 5 ft 3 in (1.60 m)

Judy Tyler (December 24, 1947, in Los Angeles, California, – June 18, 2013) was Playboy magazine's Playmate of the Month for its January 1966 issue. Her centerfold was photographed by Mario Casilli.

Tyler went into sales following her Playboy days.

June 18, 2013, Judy died from complications of open heart surgery. She was 65 years old.

== February ==
Melinda Windsor

Personal details
- Born: Ann Brockway; June 25, 1944 (age 81) Akron, Ohio
- Height: 5 ft 4 in (1.63 m)

Melinda Windsor (born June 25, 1944, in Akron, Ohio) was the pseudonym used by Ann Brockway, a 21-year-old student at the University of California at Los Angeles (UCLA). She was Playboy magazine's Playmate of the Month for its February 1966 issue. Her centerfold was photographed by Tony Marco.

She used a pseudonym to protect her true identity. According to The Decatur Daily Review, from December 1966, she was 22 and married to Niells Hansson at the time she appeared on the cover of the January 1967 Playboy.

Windsor was photographed by Maynard Frank Wolfe for the January 1967 issue of Playboy and by Morton Tadder for the Fall 1967 issue of VIP magazine.

== March ==
Priscilla Wright

Personal details
- Born: November 20, 1943 (age 82) Santa Barbara, California, United States
- Height: 5 ft 2 in (1.57 m)

Priscilla Wright (born November 20, 1943) is an American model who was Playboy magazine's Playmate of the Month for its March 1966 issue. Her centerfold was photographed by Mario Casilli.

== April ==
Karla Conway

Personal details
- Born: Karla Jo Musacchia; July 5, 1946 (age 79) Pasadena, California
- Height: 4 ft 11 in (1.50 m)

Karla Conway (born Karla Jo Musacchia on July 5, 1946, in Pasadena, California) was the name used by American model and artist Karla Jo Musacchia for her appearance as Playboy magazine's Playmate of the Month for its April 1966 issue. Her centerfold was photographed by Paul Morton Smith and R. Charleton Wilson.

She has started going by the name Sachi and became an artist. Due to her concern for the environment, she created a turtle logo for companies to use for bags that they make that are both biodegradable and compostable.

== May ==
Dolly Read

Personal details
- Born: September 13, 1944 (age 81) Bristol, England
- Height: 5 ft 4.5 in (1.64 m)

Dolly Read (born September 13, 1944, in Bristol, England) is an English pinup model and actress. She is best remembered for her appearance in Playboy May 1966 magazine and as the lead character in the motion picture Beyond the Valley of the Dolls. She is sometimes credited as Margaret Read, Dolly Read Martin, or Dolly Martin.

In 1971, Read married American comedian Dick Martin. They divorced in 1974 and were remarried in 1978 and remained married up to Dick Martin's death on May 24, 2008.

== June ==
Kelly Burke

Personal details
- Born: December 31, 1944 (age 81) Los Angeles, California
- Height: 5 ft 1 in (1.55 m)

Kelly Burke (born December 31, 1944) is an American model who was Playboy magazine's Playmate of the Month for its June 1966 issue. Her centerfold was photographed by William Figge.

Burke was born in Los Angeles, California.

According to The Playmate Book, Kelli was pregnant while she was shooting her Playmate centerfold. She also was (at the time) the sister-in-law of 1966 Playmate of the Year Allison Parks.

== July ==
Tish Howard

Personal details
- Born: July 4, 1946 (age 79) New York City, New York, United States
- Height: 5 ft 5 in (1.65 m)

Tish Howard (born July 4, 1946, in New York City) was Playboy magazine's Playmate of the Month for its July 1966 issue.

Her centerfold was photographed by William Figge and Ed DeLong. She was a finalist for the title of 1967's Playmate of the Year, along with Susan Denberg and the winner, Lisa Baker.

== August ==
Susan Denberg

Personal details
- Born: Dietlinde Zechner; August 2, 1944 (age 81) Bad Polzin, Germany (now in Poland)
- Height: 5 ft 7 in (1.70 m)

Susan Denberg (born August 2, 1944, in Bad Polzin, Germany (now Połczyn-Zdrój, Poland)) is the stage name of an Austrian model and actress, born Dietlinde Zechner. She was Playboy magazine's Playmate of the Month for its August 1966 issue.

Her centerfold was photographed by Peter Gowland. She also was one of the finalists for the title of 1967's Playmate of the Year along with Tish Howard and the eventual winner, Lisa Baker.

She was married to Tony Scotti (1965–1968) (divorced). She had a son Wolfgang-Dieter in 1971; the father is of Yugoslavian descent and a second child. Now as Dietlinde Scotti, she resides in the tenth district of Vienna, Austria.[3][4]

== September ==
Dianne Chandler

Personal details
- Born: December 31, 1946 (age 79) Oak Park, Illinois
- Height: 5 ft 7 in (1.70 m)

Dianne Chandler (born December 31, 1946, in Oak Park, Illinois) is an American model who served as both a Playboy Playmate of the Month and as a Playboy Bunny. She was Miss September 1966.

Her centerfold was photographed by Pompeo Posar.

== October ==
Linda Moon

Personal details
- Born: September 24, 1948 (age 77) Michigan, U.S.
- Height: 5 ft 5 in (1.65 m)

Linda Moon (born September 24, 1948, in Michigan) was Playboy magazine's Playmate of the Month for its October 1966 issue. Her centerfold was photographed by William Graham, Stan Malinowski, and Gene Trindl.

== November ==
Lisa Baker

Playboy Playmate of the Year
- 1967
- Preceded by: Allison Parks
- Succeeded by: Angela Dorian

Personal details
- Born: March 19, 1944 (age 82) Detroit, Texas
- Height: 5 ft 8 in (1.73 m)

Lisa Baker (born March 19, 1944, in Detroit, Texas) is Playboy's Playmate of the Month for November 1966, and Playmate of the Year for 1967. Her original pictorial for photographed by William Figge and Ed DeLong.

She was also able to get some work on television, on The Jonathan Winters Show and as the Budweiser girl on The Tonight Show Starring Johnny Carson.

She posed nude for the December 1979 Playboy pictorial "Playmates Forever!"

== December ==
Susan Bernard
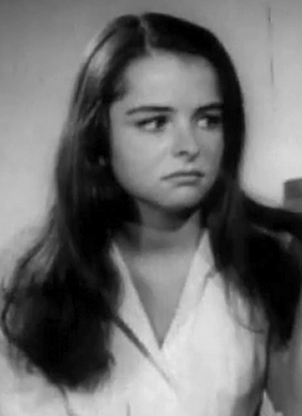
- Susan Bernard circa 1965.

Personal details
- Born: February 11, 1948 Los Angeles, California
- Died: June 21, 2019 (aged 71) Los Angeles, California
- Height: 5 ft 3 in (1.60 m)
- Official website

Susan Bernard (February 11, 1948 – June 21, 2019 Los Angeles, California) was Playboy magazine's Playmate of the Month for its December 1966 issue. Her centerfold was photographed by Mario Casilli and her father Bruno Bernard.

Bernard had a sporadic film and television career, appearing for one season of General Hospital in the late 1960s and in small parts in series television. In most of her work, she was credited as Sue Bernard.

When she posed for Playboy, she was working on the Russ Meyer film Faster, Pussycat! Kill! Kill!. She was believed – at the time – to be the first Jewish Playmate of the month. However, at the turn of the 21st century, Cindy Fuller, Miss May 1959, has claimed that she was the first Jewish Playmate.

In an interview in the August 1998 issue of Femme Fatales, Bernard revealed, "I was the first under-18 Jewish virgin who was in the centerfold placed in front of a Christmas tree." Prior to her Playboy photo shoot, she had never been nude in front of anyone other than her mother.

The photographer of her centerfold, Mario Cassili, was one of her father's apprentices. Her father was photographer Bruno Bernard. She was working on several books about her father that were published before her death.

On June 21, 2019 – in Los Angeles – 71-year-old Susan Bernard died from an apparent cardiac arrest.

== See also ==
- List of people in Playboy 1960–1969

Judy Tyler	Melinda Windsor	Priscilla Wright	Karla Conway	Dolly Read	Kelly Burke
Tish Howard	Susan Denberg	Dianne Chandler	Linda Moon	Lisa Baker	Susan Bernard
