= List of Playboy Playmates of 1967 =

The following is a list of Playboy Playmates of 1967. Playboy magazine names their Playmate of the Month each month throughout the year.

== January ==
Surrey Marshe

Personal details
- Born: Solveig Mellomborgen; November 11, 1947 (age 78) Denmark
- Height: 5 ft 2 in (157 cm)

Surrey Marshe (born Solveig Mellomborgen; November 11, 1947) was Playboy magazine's Playmate of the Month for its January 1967 issue. Her centerfold was photographed by Alexas Urba. As "Pat Fellowes", she also appeared as Penthouse's Pet of the Month for October 1969, as well as in other men's magazines of the time.

Mellomborgen wrote about her experiences as a playmate in a 1969 book, called The Girl In The Centerfold.

== February ==
Kim Farber

Personal details
- Born: December 7, 1946 (age 79) Chicago, Illinois, U.S.
- Height: 5 ft 4 in (163 cm)

Kim Farber (born December 7, 1946) was Playboy magazine's Playmate of the Month for its February 1967 issue. Her centerfold was photographed by Stan Malinowski.

== March ==
Fran Gerard

Personal details
- Born: Frances Anna Camuglia; March 23, 1948 Staten Island, New York, U.S.
- Died: May 30, 1985 (aged 37) Fountain Valley, California, Orange County, California, U.S.
- Height: 5 ft 2 in (157 cm)

Fran Gerard (born Frances Anna Camuglia; March 23, 1948 – May 30, 1985) was Playboy magazine's Playmate of the Month for its March 1967 issue. Her centerfold was photographed by Mario Casilli and Gene Trindl.

She married Jack Cavender briefly in 1966, then married Max Rey in 1970.

Fran liked to read, listen to jazz music and go antique hunting. Besides her famous Playboy magazine photos, she worked as an assistant to the Los Angeles Astrologer Jack Gemini which got her interested in astrology.

Fran committed suicide on May 30, 1985, in Fountain Valley, California (Orange County), and was interred at Fairhaven Memorial Park in Santa Ana, CA. Fran was 37.

== April ==
Gwen Wong

Personal details
- Born: August 12, 1942 Manila, Luzon, Philippines
- Died: August 14, 2024 (aged 82)
- Height: 5 ft (152 cm)

Gwen Wong (born August 12, 1942 - August 14, 2024) is a Filipino-American model and actress. She is Eurasian, being a mixture of Chinese, Scottish, Spanish, Australian, Filipino and Irish. She was Playboy magazine's Playmate of the Month for its April 1967 issue. Her centerfold was photographed by Mario Casilli and Gene Trindl.

Wong worked as a Bunny at the Los Angeles Playboy Club, and later became an artist specializing in body casting and sculptural portraiture.

She appeared in one film, The Witchmaker (1969), playing the role of "Fong Qual". Her film credit, Gwen Lipscomb, was the result of her first marriage.

== May ==
Anne Randall

Personal details
- Born: Barbara Ann Burrus; September 23, 1944 (age 82) Alameda, California, U.S.
- Height: 5 ft 4 in (163 cm)

Anne Randall (born Barbara Ann Burrus on September 23, 1944) is an American model and actress. She was Playboy magazine's Playmate of the Month for its May 1967 issue.

Her centerfold was photographed by Mario Casilli.

== June ==
Joey Gibson

Personal details
- Born: Nancy Virginia Cole; August 11, 1945 (age 81) Santa Monica, California, U.S.
- Height: 5 ft 6 in (168 cm)

Joey Gibson (born Nancy Virginia Cole on August 11, 1945) was Playboy magazine's Playmate of the Month for its June 1967 issue.

Her centerfold was photographed by Peter Gowland.

== July ==
Heather Ryan

Personal details
- Born: March 18, 1947 (age 79) Newport, Kentucky, U.S.
- Height: 5 ft 6 in (168 cm)

Heather Ryan (born March 18, 1947) was Playboy magazine's Playmate of the Month for its July 1967 issue. Her centerfold was photographed by William Figge and Ed DeLong.

Ryan went on to become a wildlife biologist. She writes about scientific topics and leads ecotours.

== August ==
DeDe Lind

Personal details
- Born: Diane Gayle Lind; April 15, 1947 Los Angeles, California, U.S.
- Died: February 4, 2020 (aged 76) Boca Raton, Florida, U.S.
- Height: 5 ft 2 in (157 cm)

DeDe Lind (April 15, 1947 – February 4, 2020) Born Diane Gayle Lind; was Playboy magazine's Playmate of the Month for its August 1967 issue. Her centerfold was photographed by Mario Casilli.

Lind died February 4, 2020, from ovarian cancer in Boca Raton, Florida. She was 72.

== September ==
Angela Dorian

Playboy Playmate of the Year
- 1968
- Preceded by: Lisa Baker
- Succeeded by: Connie Kreski

Personal details
- Born: Victoria Vetri; September 26, 1944 (age 82) Los Angeles, California, U.S.
- Height: 5 ft 5 in (165 cm)

Angela Dorian (born Victoria Vetri; September 26, 1944) is an American model and actress. She was Playboy magazine's Playmate of the Month for its September 1967 issue and Playmate of the Year for 1968. Her centerfold was photographed by Carl Gunther.

== October ==
Reagan Wilson

Personal details
- Born: Reagan Diana Wilson; March 6, 1947 (age 79) Torrance, California, U.S.
- Died: March 20, 2026 unknown
- Height: 5 ft 10 in (178 cm)

whosaliveandwhosdead.com

Reagan Diana Wilson (born March 6, 1947) was an American model and actress. She was Playboy magazine's Playmate of the Month for its October 1967 issue. Her centerfold was photographed by Ron Vogel. Wilson again posed nude for Playboy for the pictorial "Playmates Forever!" in December 1979. She died on March 20, 2026.

== November ==
Kaya Christian

Personal details
- Born: October 4, 1946 (age 80) Beverly Hills, California, U.S.
- Height: 5 ft 6 in (168 cm)

Kaya Christian (born October 4, 1946) was Playboy magazine's Playmate of the Month for its November 1967 issue. Her centerfold was photographed by William Figge and Ed DeLong.

== December ==
Lynn Winchell

Personal details
- Born: May 4, 1947 (age 79) New York City, New York, U.S.
- Height: 5 ft (152 cm)

Lynn Winchell (born May 4, 1947) was Playboy magazine's Playmate of the Month for its December 1967 issue. Her centerfold was photographed by William Figge and Ed DeLong.

== See also ==
- List of people in Playboy 1960–1969

Surrey Marshe	Kim Farber	Fran Gerard	Gwen Wong	Anne Randall	Joey Gibson
Heather Ryan	DeDe Lind	Angela Dorian	Reagan Wilson	Kaya Christian	Lynn Winchell
