= List of Playboy Playmates of 1968 =

The following is a list of Playboy Playmates of 1968. Playboy magazine names its Playmate of the Month each month throughout the year.

== January ==
Connie Kreski

Playboy Playmate of the Year
- 1969
- Preceded by: Angela Dorian
- Succeeded by: Claudia Jennings

Personal details
- Born: September 19, 1946; Wyandotte, Michigan, United States
- Died: March 21, 1995 (aged 48); Beverly Hills, California, United States
- Height: 5 ft 5 in (165 cm)

Connie Kreski (September 19, 1946 – March 21, 1995), an American model and actress, is Playboy magazine's Playmate of the Month for January 1968 and Playmate of the Year for 1969. Kreski had long taffy-colored hair and blue eyes.

Kreski died from a blocked carotid artery on March 21, 1995, in Beverly Hills, California. She was 48.

== February ==
Nancy Harwood

Personal details
- Born: Nancy Rebecca Harwood; December 17, 1948; Riverside, California
- Died: May 13, 2014 (aged 65)
- Height: 5 ft 7 in (170 cm)

Nancy Harwood (December 17, 1948 – May 13, 2014) was Playboy magazine's Playmate of the Month for its February 1968 issue. Her centerfold was photographed by William Figge and Ed DeLong. She describes herself in her Playboy.com biography page as "really inexperienced, still a virgin, in fact" at the time she posed for her centerfold.

Nancy had an older brother and an older sister. Her father was a pharmacist. She became a representative for several jewelry makers, as well as the one-time president of the Centerfold Alumni Association.

Nancy Rebecca (Harwood) Kelly died May 13, 2014 after a 2-year battle with cancer. Nancy was 65.

== March ==
Michelle Hamilton

Personal details
- Born: Roxanna P Platt; December 20, 1948 (age 76); Elmira, New York, United States
- Height: 5 ft 4.5 in (164 cm)

Michelle Hamilton (born Roxanna Platt on December 20, 1948, in Elmira, New York) was Playboy magazine's Playmate of the Month for its March 1968 issue. She made a prior appearance in Playboy in the November 1967 issue in the Playboy Charter Yacht Party pictorial (starting on page 133) as "Roxanna". Her centerfold was photographed by William Figge and Ed DeLong.

Dr. Roxanna P. Platt is a family medicine doctor in Palm Beach Gardens, Florida. She received her medical degree from Spartan Health Sciences University and has been in practice for more than 20 years.

== April ==
Gaye Rennie

Personal details
- Born: September 21, 1949 (age 75); Los Angeles, California
- Height: 5 ft 6 in (168 cm)

Gaye Rennie (born September 21, 1949, in Los Angeles) was Playboy magazine's Playmate of the Month for its April 1968 issue. Her centerfold was photographed by William Figge and Ed DeLong.

== May ==
Elizabeth Jordan

Personal details
- Born: January 11, 1945 (age 80); Fort Myers, Florida
- Height: 5 ft 2 in (157 cm)

Elizabeth Jordan (born January 11, 1945, in Fort Myers, Florida) was Playboy magazine's Playmate of the Month for its May 1968 issue. Her centerfold was photographed by Mario Casilli.

In addition to being a Playmate, Jordan was also a Bunny at the Playboy Clubs in Chicago, New York City and Atlanta. According to The Playmate Book, she later became the associate dean of an unnamed university in the Western United States.

== June ==
Britt Fredriksen

Personal details
- Born: 1 October 1945 (age 79); Norway
- Height: 5 ft 4 in (163 cm)

Britt Fredriksen (born 1 October 1945 in Norway) was Playboy magazine's Playmate of the Month for its June 1968 issue. Her centerfold was photographed by Pompeo Posar.

== July ==
Melodye Prentiss

Personal details
- Born: December 14, 1944; Chicago, Illinois
- Died: March 3, 2009 (aged 64); Los Angeles, California
- Height: 5 ft 5 in (1.65 m)

Melodye Prentiss (December 14, 1944 in Chicago – March 3, 2009 in California) was Playboy magazine's Playmate of the Month for its July 1968 issue. Her centerfold was photographed by Pompeo Posar.

Melodye was working in the Playboy editorial library when she was "discovered" by the magazine as Playmate material. She studied fine art and painting at both the Chicago Academy of Fine Arts and the University of Chicago.

Prentiss died on March 3, 2009, after taking medications that made her unable to breathe following knee surgery and other illnesses.

== August ==
Gale Olson

Personal details
- Born: October 27, 1947 (age 77); Fort Sill, Oklahoma, U.S.
- Height: 5 ft 4 in (1.63 m)

Gale Olson (born October 27, 1947, in Fort Sill, Oklahoma) was Playboy magazine's Playmate of the Month for its August 1968 issue. Her centerfold was photographed by Ron Vogel.

Her mother was from New Zealand, and her father was in the United States Army. Gale grew up with five brothers and three sisters.

For a time, Gale worked as a Bunny at the Chicago Playboy Club.

Olson's daughter, Crystal McCahill, appeared on the November 9, 2008, edition of The Girls Next Door at the Hooters near Chicago's O'Hare International Airport, in a radio interview with Bridget Marquardt and McCahill's tryout effort for the 55th anniversary edition of Playboy in January 2009. McCahill is the May 2009 Playmate of the Month.

== September ==
Dru Hart

Personal details
- Born: November 25, 1948 (age 76); San Fernando, California
- Height: 5 ft 4 in (1.63 m)

Drucilla Hart (born November 25, 1948, in San Fernando, California) was Playboy magazine's Playmate of the Month for its September 1968 issue. Her centerfold was photographed by Bill Figge and Mel Figge. At the time of her pictorial, Hart was working as a legal secretary.

== October ==
Majken Haugedal

Personal details
- Born: 26 March 1947 (age 78); Copenhagen, Denmark
- Height: 5 ft 5 in (1.65 m)

Majken Haugedal aka: Majken Kruse (born 26 March 1947 in Copenhagen, Denmark) was Playboy magazine's Playmate of the Month for its October 1968 issue. Her centerfold was photographed by Pompeo Posar.

Posar is quoted in The Playmate Book as saying that Majken and Connie Kreski were the two finalists for the title of 1969 Playmate of the Year. Kreski won the title in the long run, but Majken posed for Playboy again in the April 1984 pictorial "Playmates Forever! Part Two."

== November ==
Paige Young

Personal details
- Born: Paige Diane Lee Young; March 16, 1944; Los Angeles, California, U.S.
- Died: April 7, 1974 (aged 30); Los Angeles, California, U.S.
- Height: 5 ft 5 in (1.65 m)

Paige Young (March 16, 1944 – April 7, 1974) born as Paige Diane Lee Young, was an American painter who was Playboy magazine's Playmate of the Month for its November 1968 issue. Her centerfold was photographed by Peter Gowland.

Paige died from a self-inflicted gunshot wound on April 7, 1974. Paige was 30 years old.

== December ==
Cynthia Myers
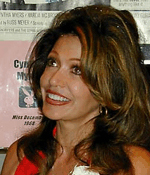

Personal details
- Born: September 12, 1950; Toledo, Ohio, U.S.
- Died: November 4, 2011 (aged 61); Los Angeles, U.S.
- Height: 5 ft 3 in (1.60 m)

Cynthia Myers (September 12, 1950 – November 4, 2011) was an American model and actress, and Playboy magazine's Playmate of the Month for the December 1968 issue.

=== Career ===
Cynthia Myers was the first Playboy Playmate born in the 1950s when she appeared in the magazine in December 1968. The pictures were shot in June 1968 when she was 17 years old, but it was Playboy's policy by that time to wait until a Playmate turned 18 before her pictures would be published. Her centerfold was photographed by Pompeo Posar.

After her magazine debut, Myers made frequent appearances on Hugh Hefner's Playboy After Dark TV series in 1969. She took a leading role as the sensitive lesbian rock and roll singer and bass player, Casey Anderson, in Russ Meyer's Beyond the Valley of the Dolls. She followed that with a supporting role in the 1972 Western, Molly and Lawless John.

Myers died of lung cancer in Los Angeles, California at the age of 61.

== See also ==
- List of people in Playboy 1960–1969

Connie Kreski	Nancy Harwood	Michelle Hamilton	Gaye Rennie	Elizabeth Jordan	Britt Fredriksen
Melodye Prentiss	Gale Olson	Dru Hart	Majken Haugedal	Paige Young	Cynthia Myers
