= List of Playboy Playmates of 1973 =

The following is a list of Playboy Playmates of 1973. Playboy magazine names their Playmate of the Month each month throughout the year.

== January ==
Miki Garcia

Personal details
- Born: February 17, 1947 (age 79) Kingman, Arizona, United States
- Height: 5 ft 4 in (1.63 m)

Miki Garcia (born February 17, 1947, in Kingman, Arizona) is an American model. She is best known for being Playboy magazine's Playmate of the Month for its January 1973 issue. Her centerfold was photographed by Mario Casilli.

== February ==
Cynthia Wood

Playboy Playmate of the Year
- 1974
- Preceded by: Marilyn Cole
- Succeeded by: Marilyn Lange

Personal details
- Born: September 25, 1950 (age 75) Burbank, California
- Height: 5 ft 5 in (1.65 m)

Cynthia Lynn Wood (born September 25, 1950, in Burbank, California) is an American model and actress. She is the daughter of Harold and Erma Wood. She was chosen as Playboy magazine's Playmate of the Month in February 1973, and the 1974 Playmate of the Year. Her centerfold was photographed by Pompeo Posar.

== March ==
Bonnie Large

Personal details
- Born: September 9, 1952 (age 73) Glendale, California, United States
- Height: 5 ft 5 in (1.65 m)

Bonnie Large (born September 9, 1952, in Glendale, California) was Playboy magazine's Playmate of the Month for March 1973. Her centerfold was photographed by William Figge and Mel Figge. She is noted for becoming historically the first Playmate of the Month ever to appear clearly full frontal nude. (Marilyn Cole, Playmate of the Month for January 1972, made the first full-frontal nude posing, but her pubic hair was partly covered by the shadow cast from the book in her hand).

== April ==
Julie Woodson

Personal details
- Born: July 11, 1946 Hutchinson, Kansas
- Died: January 21, 2022 (aged 75)
- Height: 5 ft 8 in (1.73 m)

Julie Woodson (July 11, 1946 – January 21, 2022 in Hutchinson, Kansas) was Playboy magazine's Playmate of the Month for April 1973. Her centerfold was photographed by David Chan. Woodson was only the third African-American Playboy Playmate of the Month, the earlier two being Jennifer Jackson in March 1965 and Jean Bell in October 1969. She died on January 21, 2022 at the age of 75.

== May ==
Anulka Dziubinska
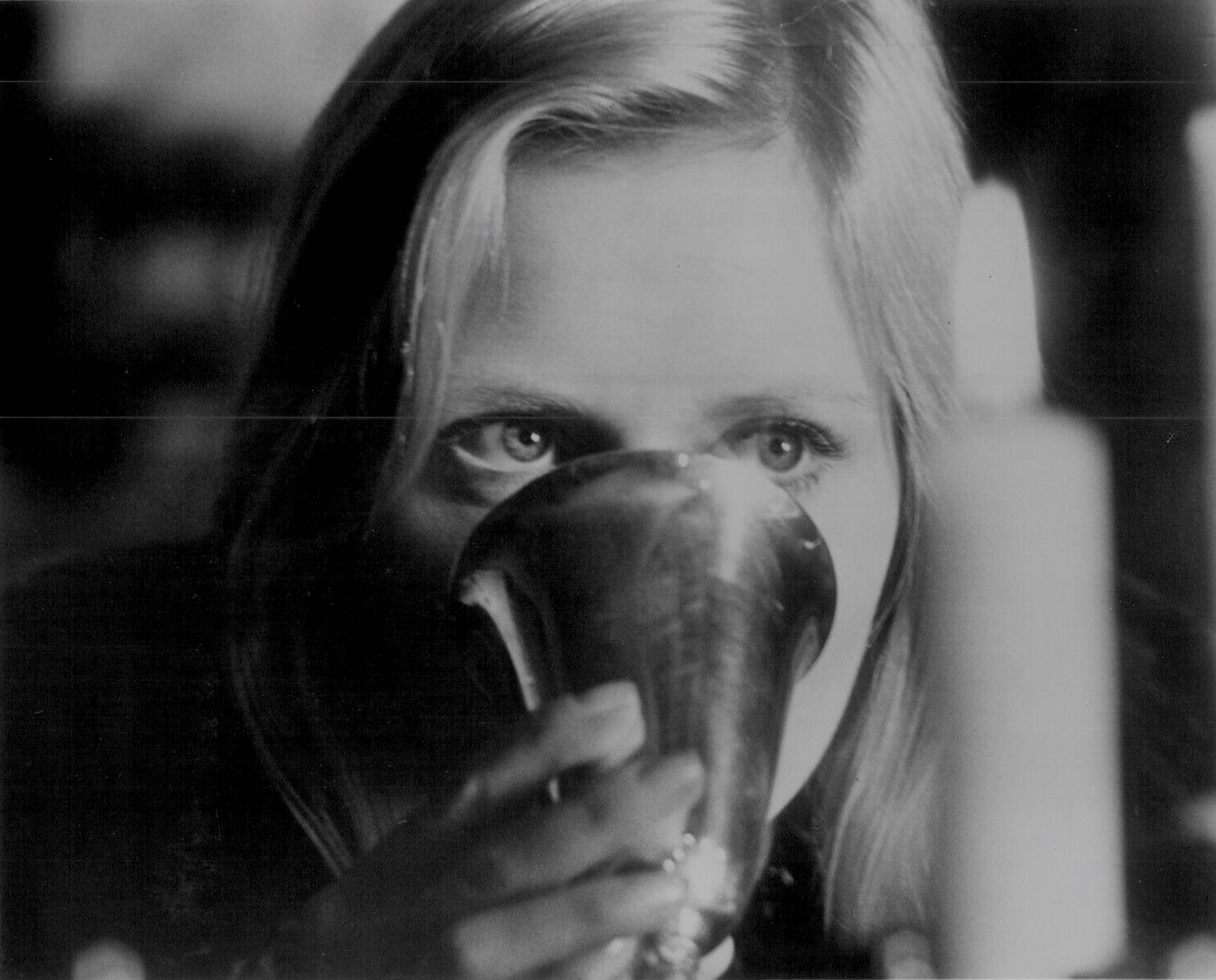
- Dziubinska in Vampyres (1974)

Personal details
- Born: 14 December 1950 (age 75) Preston, Lancashire, England, UK
- Height: 5 ft 4 in (1.63 m)

Anulka Maria Dziubinska (born 14 December 1950) is an English actress and model. She was featured as Playboy magazine's Playmate of the Month in May 1973.

After her Playmate appearance, Dziubinska became an actress of film and television, perhaps most prominently in her debut role as a lesbian vampire in the British exploitation film classic Vampyres (1974), in which she was credited by only her first name, Anulka.

Further acting assignments followed. In the late 1970s, Dziubinska moved to the USA. She continued her career and married twice. She left the public eye in 1985, however, when she became pregnant with her first child.

Eventually, she became a floral designer and owner of a florist shop in Hollywood. She returned to England in 2003 for an appearance in the documentary short Return of the Vampyres, in which she shares her memories of working on the film. In 2006, she co-wrote a book about flower design, Zen Flowers: Designs to Soothe the Senses and Nourish the Soul.

== June ==
Ruthy Ross

Personal details
- Born: March 22, 1948 (age 78) Bourbon, Missouri
- Height: 5 ft 2 in (1.57 m)

Ruthy Ross (born March 22, 1948, in Bourbon, Missouri) was Playboy magazine's Playmate of the Month for June 1973. Her centerfold was photographed by Mario Casilli. She is sometimes credited as Ruthey Ross.

== July ==
Martha Smith

Personal details
- Born: October 16, 1952 (age 73) Cleveland, Ohio
- Height: 5 ft 6 in (1.68 m)

Martha Smith (born Martha Anne Smith on October 16, 1952, in Cleveland, Ohio) is an American model and actress. She is sometimes credited as Martha L. Smith.

Smith attended Michigan State University. Smith has starred in movies, such as National Lampoon's Animal House, and has appeared in several TV series as a guest star. She was a regular on the adventure series Scarecrow and Mrs. King, and appeared as a frequent panelist on The $25,000 Pyramid.

In July 1973, she was chosen Playboy magazine's Playmate of the Month. Her centerfold was photographed by Pompeo Posar.

== August ==
Phyllis Coleman

Personal details
- Born: August 31, 1949 (age 76) White Plains, New York
- Height: 5 ft 7 in (1.70 m)

Phyllis Coleman (born August 31, 1949, in White Plains, New York) is an American model. She was Playboy magazine's Playmate of the Month for the August 1973 issue. Her centerfold was photographed by the husband-and-wife team of Bill Figge and Mel Figge.

== September ==
Geri Glass

Personal details
- Born: June 20, 1949 (age 77) Phoenix, Arizona, United States
- Height: 5 ft 8 in (1.73 m)

Geri Glass (born June 20, 1949, in Phoenix, Arizona) is an American model. She was Playboy magazine's Playmate of the Month for the September 1973 issue. Her centerfold was photographed by Mario Casilli.

== October ==
Valerie Lane

Personal details
- Born: August 4, 1949 (age 77) Long Beach, California, United States
- Height: 5 ft 7 in (1.70 m)

Valerie Lane (born August 4, 1949, in Long Beach, California) is an American model. She was Playboy magazine's Playmate of the Month for the October 1973 issue. Her centerfold was photographed by William Figge and Mel Figge.

== November ==
Monica Tidwell

Personal details
- Born: January 14, 1954 (age 72) Shreveport, Louisiana
- Height: 5 ft 2.5 in (1.59 m)

Monica Tidwell (born January 14, 1954, in Shreveport, Louisiana) is an American model. A red-head, she was Playboy magazine's Playmate of the Month for the November 1973 issue. Her centerfold was photographed by Dwight Hooker and Bill Frantz.

== December ==
Christine Maddox

Personal details
- Born: March 24, 1950 (age 76) Tracy, California, United States
- Height: 5 ft 8 in (1.73 m)

Christine Maddox (born March 24, 1950, in Tracy, California) is an American model. She is best known for being Playboy magazine's Playmate of the Month for its December 1973 issue. Her centerfold was photographed by Richard Fegley.

== See also ==
- List of people in Playboy 1970–79

Miki Garcia	Cyndi Wood	Bonnie Large	Julie Woodson	Anulka Dziubinska	Ruthy Ross
Martha Smith	Phyllis Coleman	Geri Glass	Valerie Lane	Monica Tidwell	Christine Maddox
