= Gloria Root =

American model (1948–2006)

Playboy centerfold appearance
- December 1969
- Preceded by: Claudia Jennings
- Succeeded by: Jill Taylor

Personal details
- Born: May 28, 1948 Chicago, Illinois, United States
- Died: January 8, 2006 (aged 57) San Francisco, California, United States
- Height: 5 ft 2 in (1.57 m)

Gloria Root (May 28, 1948 – January 8, 2006) was Playboy magazine's Playmate of the Month for the December 1969 issue. Her centerfold was photographed by Pompeo Posar.

== Biography ==
=== Education ===
Root started her higher education at the University of Illinois, but later transferred to Northwestern University, to major in political science. She graduated from Rhode Island School of Design with degrees in fine arts and architecture. She then took a master's degree in City Planning and a Master's of Architecture at the University of California, Berkeley.

=== Career ===
In 1980, she opened her own planning firm, Planning Analysis and Development, in San Francisco. She headed the firm until 1998, when she relocated to New York. While in New York, Root headed the strategic planning services division of Skidmore, Owings and Merrill. She returned to San Francisco in 2002 to a job as a project manager for Auberge Resorts. She later took a senior position with RBF Consulting. From 1990 to 1998, Root was a board member of San Francisco Urban Planning + Research Association, a public-policy think-tank promoting good government and sustainable urban planning.

=== Private life ===
In 1970 she was arrested in Greece, convicted of smuggling 38 pounds (17 Kilos) of hashish across the border from Turkey, and received a prison sentence of 10 months. She was married to Richard Dodson in 1984; they were divorced at the time of her death. Her daughter, Francesca, was born in 1986. Root died from cancer in 2006.

== See also ==
- List of people in Playboy 1960–1969

Leslie Bianchini	Lorrie Menconi	Kathy MacDonald	Lorna Hopper	Sally Sheffield	Helena Antonaccio
Nancy McNeil	Debbie Hooper	Shay Knuth	Jean Bell	Claudia Jennings	Gloria Root
