= List of Playboy Playmates of 1970 =

The following is a list of Playboy picture Playmates of 1970. Playboy magazine names their Playmate of the Month each month throughout the year.

== January ==
Jill Taylor

Personal details
- Born: October 14, 1951 (age 74) Van Nuys, California
- Height: 5 ft 4 in (163 cm)

Jill Taylor (born October 14, 1951, in Van Nuys, California) is an American model. She was Playboy magazine's Playmate of the Month for its January 1970 issue.

== February ==
Linda Forsythe

Personal details
- Born: May 14, 1950 (age 76) Jersey City, New Jersey, United States
- Height: 5 ft 3 in (160 cm)

Linda Forsythe (born May 14, 1950, in Jersey City, New Jersey) is an American model. She was Playboy magazine's Playmate of the Month for its February 1970 issue. Her centerfold was photographed by Pompeo Posar.

== March ==
Chris Koren

Personal details
- Born: August 8, 1947 (age 79) Cleveland, Ohio, United States
- Height: 5 ft 7 in (1.70 m)

Christine Koren (born August 8, 1947, in Cleveland, Ohio) is an American model. She was Playboy magazine's Playmate of the Month for its March 1970 issue. Her centerfold was photographed by William Figge and Mel Figge.

== April ==
Barbara Hillary

Personal details
- Born: February 18, 1949 (age 77) Milwaukee, Wisconsin, United States
- Height: 5 ft 6 in (1.68 m)

Barbara Hillary (born February 18, 1949, in Milwaukee, Wisconsin) was Playboy magazine's Playmate of the Month for the April 1970 issue. Her centerfold was photographed by Pompeo Posar.

== May ==
Jennifer Liano

Personal details
- Born: Judy Young; February 24, 1948 San Diego, California, U.S.
- Died: October 8, 2024 (aged 76)
- Height: 5 ft 4.5 in (1.64 m)

Judy Young (later Stirling, February 24, 1948 – October 8, 2024), better known as Jennifer Liano, was an American model of Italian descent. She was Playboy magazine's Playmate of the Month for its May 1970 issue. Her centerfold was photographed by Dwight Hooker. Her daughter is Real Housewives of Orange County star Lydia McLaughlin. Liano died on October 8, 2024, at the age of 76.

== June ==
Elaine Morton

Personal details
- Born: August 17, 1949 (age 77) Wichita Falls, Texas, U.S.
- Height: 5 ft 5 in (1.65 m)

Elaine Morton (born August 17, 1949) is an American model. She was Playboy magazine's Playmate of the Month for its June 1970 issue. Her cousin, Karen Morton, was the July 1978 Playmate.

== July ==
Carol Willis

Personal details
- Born: April 17, 1949 Bowie County, Texas, U.S.
- Died: November 24, 1971 (aged 22) Laguna Beach, California, U.S.
- Height: 5 ft 6 in (168 cm)

Carol Willis (April 17, 1949 – November 24, 1971) was an American model. She was Playboy magazine's Playmate of the Month for its July 1970 issue and her centerfold was photographed by Pompeo Posar.

She died in an automobile accident in Laguna Beach, California.

== August ==
Sharon Clark

Playboy Playmate of the Year
- 1971
- Preceded by: Claudia Jennings
- Succeeded by: Liv Lindeland

Personal details
- Born: October 15, 1943 (age 82) Seminole, Oklahoma
- Height: 5 ft 6.5 in (169 cm)

Sharon Clark (born October 15, 1943, in Seminole, Oklahoma) is an American model and actress. She is Playboy's Playmate of the Month for August 1970. Her centerfold was photographed by William Figge and Ed DeLong. In 1971, at age 27, she became the oldest Playmate of the Year so far and remained so for 15 years, until Miss May 1985 Kathy Shower became PMOY 1986 at age 33. She was also a Playboy Bunny at the St. Louis club.

== September ==
Debbie Ellison

Personal details
- Born: June 17, 1949 (age 77) Atlantic City, New Jersey, United States
- Height: 5 ft 6.5 in (169 cm)

Debbie Ellison (born June 17, 1949, in Atlantic City, New Jersey) is an American model. She is best known for being Playboy magazine's Playmate of the Month for its September 1970 issue. Her centerfold was photographed by Pompeo Posar. This centerfold was later used in the movie Tremors 2: Aftershocks as a double for Helen Shaver, although she is incorrectly identified in the movie as Miss October 1974. She was also a Playboy Bunny at the New York club.

== October ==
Mary Collinson

Personal details
- Born: July 22, 1952 Sliema, Malta
- Died: November 23, 2021 (aged 69) Milan, Malta
- Height: 5 ft 6.5 in (169 cm)

Mary Collinson (July 22, 1952 – November 23, 2021) was a model and actress . She was chosen as Playboy magazine's Playmate of the Month in October 1970, together with her twin sister Madeleine Collinson. They were the first identical twin Playmate sisters.

Both sisters went on to acting careers, mostly in B-movies. Her sister is quoted in The Playmate Book as saying that Mary had two daughters and was now living in Milan with an "Italian gentleman", with whom she had been for more than 20 years. Collinson died from bronchopneumonia in Milan, on 23 November 2021, at the age of 69.

Madeleine Collinson

Personal details
- Born: July 22, 1952 Sliema, Malta
- Died: August 14, 2014 (aged 62) Msida, Malta
- Height: 5 ft 6 in (168 cm)

Madeleine Collinson (July 22, 1952 – August 14, 2014) was a model and actress. She was chosen as Playboy Playmate of the Month in October, 1970, together with her twin sister Mary.

Both sisters went on to acting careers, mostly in B-movies. Madeleine married a British Royal Air Force officer and raised three children. She later moved back to Malta and was involved in cultural and educational activities there. After several months of illness, she died at Mater Dei Hospital in Msida on August 14, 2014, with her sister Mary present.

== November ==
Avis Miller

Personal details
- Born: November 4, 1945 Ohio, United States
- Died: November 11, 2021 (aged 76) Tulsa, Oklahoma, U.S.
- Height: 5 ft 9 in (1.75 m)

Avis Miller (November 4, 1945 – November 11, 2021) was an American model. She was Playboy magazine's Playmate of the Month for the November 1970 issue. Her centerfold was photographed by Dwight Hooker. She was also a Playboy Bunny at the San Francisco club and later served as a flight attendant on the company's luxury commercial airliner. She died on November 11, 2021.

== December ==
Carol Imhof

Personal details
- Born: March 13, 1948 (age 78) Chicago, Illinois, United States
- Height: 5 ft 5 in (1.65 m)

Carol Imhof (born March 13, 1948, in Chicago, Illinois) was an American model. She was Playboy magazine's Playmate of the Month for its December 1970 issue. Her centerfold was photographed by Dwight Hooker.

Imhof studied elementary education at Southern Illinois University and worked at the Playboy Club in Chicago. She also appeared in the July 1969 and February 1970 issues of Playboy.

Jill Taylor	Linda Forsythe	Chris Koren	Barbara Hillary	Jennifer Liano	Elaine Morton
Carol Willis	Sharon Clark	Debbie Ellison	Mary and Madeleine Collinson	Avis Miller	Carol Imhof
