= Ashlyn Martin =

American model

Ashlyn Martin (Laura Lynn Hale)

Playboy centerfold appearance
- April 1964
- Preceded by: Nancy Scott
- Succeeded by: Terri Kimball

Personal details
- Born: Laura Lynn Hale; 20 March 1946; London, England
- Died: 24 October 1991 (aged 45)
- Height: 5 ft 5 in (1.65 m)

Ashlyn Martin (Laura Lynn Hale) (20 March 1946 – 24 October 1991) was the stage name of Laura Lynn Hale, a model and actress who was Playboy magazine's Playmate of the Month for its April 1964 issue. She was born in London, England.

== Career ==
Her centerfold was photographed by Pompeo Posar and Mario Casilli. She also appeared in the July 1963 issue of Playboy in The Bunnies, a pictorial, as well as in a photograph dated 1960 (along with Playmate/Bunny Patti Reynolds) in The Bunny Years (page 56) by Kathryn Leigh Scott. In the January 1966 Issue of Playboy she appeared in the Playboy Mansion Pictorial along with Allison Parks (starting on page 105). In The Playmate Book, Hugh Hefner says that Laura's pseudonym was inspired by a character in the Ernest Hemingway novel The Sun Also Rises, most likely Brett Ashley.

She also worked as a Bunny at the Chicago Playboy Club.

Laura died 24 October 1991 at the age of 45 from suicide.

== Filmography ==
- Blood Feast (1963) .... Marcy
- Beach Party (1963) .... Surfer (uncredited)
- Burke's Law – "Who Killed Alex Debbs?" (1963) (as Laura Lynn Hale) .... 2nd Deb Girl
- Muscle Beach Party (1964) .... Beach girl

Sharon Rogers	Nancy Jo Hooper	Nancy Scott	Ashlyn Martin	Terri Kimball	Lori Winston
Melba Ogle	China Lee	Astrid Schulz	Rosemarie Hillcrest	Kai Brendlinger	Jo Collins
