= List of Playboy Playmates of 1963 =

The following is a list of Playboy Playmates of 1963. Playboy magazine names its Playmate of the Month each month throughout the year.

== January ==
Judi Monterey

Personal details
- Born: January 12, 1944 (age 82) Bell, California
- Height: 5 ft 1 in (1.55 m)

Judi Monterey (born January 12, 1944, in Bell, California) is an American model and actress. She was Playboy magazine's Playmate of the Month for its January 1963 issue.

Her centerfold is photographed by Peter Gowland.

== February ==
Toni Ann Thomas

Personal details
- Born: April 15, 1944 (age 82) Huntington Park, California, US
- Height: 5 ft 5 in (1.65 m)

Toni Ann Thomas (born April 15, 1944, in Huntington Park, California) is an American model who is best known for her appearance as Playboy magazine's Playmate of the Month for its February 1963 issue.

Her centerfold was photographed by Mario Casilli. In 1969 she was named Playmate of the Decade.

== March ==
Adrienne Moreau

Personal details
- Born: July 5, 1941 (age 84) Trenton, New Jersey, U.S.
- Height: 5 ft 7 in (1.70 m)

Adrienne Moreau (born July 5, 1941, in Trenton, New Jersey) is a French-American model who is best known for being Playboy magazine's Playmate of the Month for its March 1963 issue.

Her centerfold was photographed by Frank Eck.

== April ==
Sandra Settani

Personal details
- Born: February 18, 1938 (age 88) Wisconsin, United States
- Height: 5 ft 8 in (1.73 m)

Sandra Settani (born February 18, 1938, in Wisconsin) is an American model who was Playboy magazine's Playmate of the Month for its April 1963 issue.

Her centerfold was photographed by Bunny Yeager.

== May ==
Sharon Cintron

Personal details
- Born: January 16, 1945 Perth Amboy, New Jersey
- Died: July 31, 2017 (aged 72) Prescott, Arizona
- Height: 5 ft 4 in (1.63 m)

Sharon Cintron (born January 16, 1945, in Perth Amboy, New Jersey - died July 31 2017, in Prescott, Arizona) was an American model and actress. She was Playboy magazine's Playmate of the Month for its May 1963 issue.

Her centerfold was photographed by Mario Casilli. She later appeared in a season two episode of The Monkees called "Some Like it Lukewarm". She also held a recurring role on the TV series Baretta.

Sharon died on July 31, 2017, in Prescott, AZ after a short battle with cancer. She was 72.

== June ==
Connie Mason

Personal details
- Born: August 24, 1937 (age 88) Washington, D.C., U.S.
- Height: 5 ft 6 in (1.68 m)

Connie Mason (born August 24, 1937, in Washington, D.C.) is an American model and actress who was Playboy magazine's Playmate of the Month for its June 1963 issue.

Her centerfold was photographed by Pompeo Posar. She was also a Playboy Bunny at the Chicago club.

She met and married Shelly Kasten in New York City, who was the entertainment director for all the Playboy Clubs. Mason had previously been married to actor Tony Young from 1958 to 1962.

== July ==
Carrie Enwright White

Personal details
- Born: August 25, 1943 Beverly Hills, California
- Died: May 3, 2022 (aged 78) Los Angeles, California
- Height: 5 ft 5 in (1.65 m)

Carrie Enwright White (August 25, 1943 – May 3, 2022) Born in Beverly Hills, California, Carrie was an American hairdresser, author, and spokesperson, who in her youth worked occasionally a model. She was Playboy magazine's Playmate of the Month for its July 1963 issue.

Her centerfold was photographed by Ron Vogel.

Carrie died May 3, 2022 from cancer in Los Angeles, California, aged 78.

== August ==
Phyllis Sherwood Spivak

Personal details
- Born: Phyllis Sowicki; September 30, 1937 Niagara Falls, New York, U.S.
- Died: April 16, 2007 (aged 69) Davie, Florida, U.S.
- Height: 5 ft 1 in (1.55 m)

Phyllis Sherwood (born Phyllis Sowicki on September 30, 1937, in Niagara Falls, New York – April 16, 2007 in Davie, Florida) was an American model. She was Playboy magazine's Playmate of the Month for its August 1963 issue.

Her centerfold was photographed by Pompeo Posar.

Her real name was Phyllis Sowicki. She was born September 30, 1937, in Niagara Falls, N.Y. She moved to Fort Lauderdale, Florida, in 1959 and worked at Miami's Playboy Club for two years where she donned a bunny outfit. She continued modeling, working with different photographers and traveling to cities as a Playboy bunny. She married Merrill Spivak in 1972, became a housewife and raised her two sons and daughter. Later, the family moved to Chicago, then moved back to South Florida in 1996. She resided in Davie, where she was co-owner of her husband's condo management business.

Phyllis died of lung cancer on April 16, 2007 in Davie, aged 69.

== September ==
Victoria Valentino

Personal details
- Born: December 13, 1942 (age 83) Los Angeles, California
- Height: 5 ft 2 in (1.57 m)

Victoria Valentino (born December 13, 1942) is an American model and actress who was Playboy magazine's Playmate of the Month for its September 1963 issue. Her centerfold was photographed by Mario Casilli.

Between 1967 and 1971, Valentino acted in an episode of the television series The Man from U.N.C.L.E. and several low-budget films, using the names Vicki Carbe (and variations thereof) and Victoria Wales.

In November 2014, the 71-year-old Valentino came forward to allege comedian and actor Bill Cosby had drugged and raped her in 1970, shortly after the drowning death of her young son. Valentino is one of several women who have made public sexual-abuse allegations against Cosby Valentino was one of the five women interviewed in a Washington Post piece published on November 22, 2014, making her the sixteenth woman to come forward and speak out against Cosby. Valentino met Cosby shortly after the death of her son and claims that the comedian was trying to "cheer" her up over her loss. She was accompanied by her former roommate at the time, Meg Foster, and Cosby took the ladies to an apartment after dinner. According to Valentino, Cosby took advantage of her and Foster by drugging them with pills. From her recollection, Valentino noticed that Foster had passed out from the pills and that Cosby stood over Foster with an erection and a "predatory" look. "It was very clear to me that he was going to assault her while she was asleep or unconscious", Valentino alleged. "I reached out, grabbing him, trying to get his attention, trying to distract him. He came over to me and sat down on the love seat and opened his fly and grabbed my head and pushed my head down. And then he turned me over. It was like a waking nightmare." Valentino states that she has difficulties speaking about her sexual encounter with Bill Cosby, moreover, she did not come forward at the time because she felt that she had "little credibility."

== October ==
Christine Williams

Personal details
- Born: January 7, 1945 Basingstoke, Hampshire, England
- Died: November 22, 2017 (aged 72)
- Height: 6 ft 0 in (1.83 m)

Christine Williams (January 7, 1945 – November 22, 2017), Born in Basingstoke, England) is an English-American model, actress and artist who was Playboy magazine's Playmate of the Month for its October 1963 issue.

Her centerfold was photographed by Mario Casilli.

Christine died on November 22, 2017. No cause of death is listed.

== November ==
Terre Tucker (Karen Smith)

Personal details
- Born: Karen Smith; October 9, 1944 Arizona, United States
- Died: December 16, 1990 (aged 46)
- Height: 5 ft 6 in (1.68 m)

Terre Tucker (Karen Smith) (October 9, 1944 – December 16, 1990) was an American model who was Playboy magazine's Playmate of the Month for its November 1963 issue. Her centerfold was photographed by Stan Malinowski.

The newest edition of The Playmate Book reports that Terre died on December 16, 1990. Her cause of death listed as cervical cancer.

== December ==
Donna Michelle
- Preceded by: Terre Tucker
- Succeeded by: Sharon Rogers

Playboy Playmate of the Year
- 1964

Personal details
- Born: Donna Michelle Fick; December 8, 1945 Los Angeles, California
- Died: April 9, 2004 (aged 58) Ukiah, California, U.S.
- Height: 5 ft 4 in (163 cm)

Donna Michelle (December 8, 1945 – April 9, 2004) was an American model, actress, and photographer. She was Playboy magazine's December 1963 Playmate of the Month and 1964 Playmate of the Year. Pompeo Posar and Edmund Leja photographed her centerfold images.

Donna died April 9, 2004, suffering a heart attack in a supermarket, in Ukiah, California, at the age of 58.

== See also ==
- List of people in Playboy 1960–1969

Judi Monterey	Toni Ann Thomas	Adrienne Moreau	Sandra Settani	Sharon Cintron	Connie Mason
Carrie Enwright	Phyllis Sherwood	Victoria Valentino	Christine Williams	Terre Tucker	Donna Michelle
