= Cynthia Wood =

American model and actress (born 1950)

Cyndi Wood

Playboy centerfold appearance
- February 1973
- Preceded by: Miki Garcia
- Succeeded by: Bonnie Large

Playboy Playmate of the Year
- 1974
- Preceded by: Marilyn Cole
- Succeeded by: Marilyn Lange

Personal details
- Born: September 25, 1950 (age 76) Burbank, California, U.S.
- Height: 5 ft 5 in (1.65 m)

Cynthia Lynn Wood (born September 25, 1950) is an American model and actress. She was Miss February for 1973 and was later named Playmate of the Year in 1974.

== Biography ==
On September 25, 1950 (76 years ago), Wood was born in Burbank, California.

In February 1973, at the age of 22, Wood was chosen as Playboy magazine's Playmate of the Month, and then as the 1974 Playmate of the Year. Her centerfold was photographed by Pompeo Posar.

In 1983, Wood recorded vocals for three songs on the soundtrack for the anime film Golgo 13: The Professional (1983), credited as Cindy Wood, with lyrics written by Toshiyuki Kimori (1947–1988),

Wood has worked as a casting agent.

== Filmography ==
=== TV ===
- The Sonny & Cher Comedy Hour (S03 E19; 1973-02-10), as herself
- The Jim Stafford Show (1975), as herself

=== Film ===
- Shampoo (1975), Beauty Shop Customer
- Strange New World (1975) (TV), Araba
- Three on a Date (1978) (TV), Stewardess
- Van Nuys Boulevard (1979), Moon
- Apocalypse Now (1979), Playmate of the Year (final film role)

== Discography ==
Year	Title	Peak chart positions	Album
Year	Title	JP	Album
1983	"Pray For You"	—	Golgo 13 Original Sound Track
1983	"Love's Mystery"	—	Golgo 13 Original Sound Track
1983	"Golgo 13 and I"	—	Golgo 13 Original Sound Track
"—" denotes a recording that did not chart or was not released in that territory.

== See also ==
- List of people in Playboy 1970–79

Miki Garcia	Cyndi Wood	Bonnie Large	Julie Woodson	Anulka Dziubinska	Ruthy Ross
Martha Smith	Phyllis Coleman	Geri Glass	Valerie Lane	Monica Tidwell	Christine Maddox
