= Donna Michelle =

American actor, model and photographer (1945–2004)

Playboy centerfold appearance
- December 1963
- Preceded by: Terre Tucker
- Succeeded by: Sharon Rogers

Playboy Playmate of the Year
- 1964
- Preceded by: June Cochran
- Succeeded by: Jo Collins

Personal details
- Born: Donna Michelle Fick; December 8, 1945 Los Angeles, California, U.S.
- Died: April 9, 2004 (aged 58) Ukiah, California, U.S.
- Height: 5 ft 4 in (163 cm)

Donna Michelle Ronne (née Fick; December 8, 1945 – April 9, 2004) was an American model, actress, and photographer. Known professionally as Donna Michelle, she was Playmate of the Month for December 1963 and was later named 1964's Playmate of the Year. She was the youngest Playmate of the Year ever at just 18 years old. Pompeo Posar and Edmund Leja photographed her centerfold images.

== Personal life ==
The maiden name of Michelle's mother was Baron. On February 9, 1963, Michelle married David M. Ronne in Los Angeles; they divorced in April 1967. Michelle was seventeen years old and married when she was named Playmate of the Month.

Michelle died of a heart attack in Ukiah, California, at the age of 58.

== Filmography ==
- Company of Killers (1971) .... Gloria
- Le Bal des voyous (1968) .... Karine
- La Nuit la plus chaude (1967)
- I Spy (TV) – "Lori" (1966) .... Millicent
- One Spy Too Many (1966) .... Princess Nicole
- The Big Valley (TV) – "Barbary Red" (1966) .... Dolly
- Agent for H.A.R.M. (1966) .... Marian
- Mickey One (1965) .... The Girl
- Beach Blanket Bingo (1965) .... Animal
- Goodbye Charlie (1964) .... Guest on yacht doing the Twist
- The Man from U.N.C.L.E. (TV) – "The Double Affair" (1964) (released as a film called The Spy with My Face) .... Nina
- The Man from U.N.C.L.E. (TV) - "The Alexander the Greater Affair -Parts 1&2" (1964)

== See also ==
- List of people in Playboy 1960–1969

Judi Monterey	Toni Ann Thomas	Adrienne Moreau	Sandra Settani	Sharon Cintron	Connie Mason
Carrie Enwright	Phyllis Sherwood	Victoria Valentino	Christine Williams	Terre Tucker	Donna Michelle
