= List of Playboy Playmates of 1964 =

The following is a list of Playboy Playmates of 1964, the 10th anniversary year of the publication. Playboy magazine names its Playmate of the Month each month throughout the year.

== January ==
Sharon Rogers

Personal details
- Born: November 19, 1942 Seattle, Washington, U.S.
- Died: October 16, 2022 (aged 79) Olympia, Washington, U.S.
- Height: 5 ft 2 in (1.57 m)

Sharon Rogers (November 19, 1942 – October 16, 2022) was an American model and actress who was Playboy magazine's Playmate of the Month for its January 1964 issue.

Her centerfold was photographed by Pompeo Posar. She also was on the cover of the November 1963 issue.

Sharon died at home in Olympia, Washington, on October 16, 2022, at the age of 79.

== February ==
Nancy Jo Hooper

Personal details
- Born: Nancy Ann Harrison; July 17, 1943 Spartanburg, South Carolina
- Died: November 15, 2012 (aged 69) Charleston, South Carolina
- Height: 5 ft 6 in (1.68 m)

Nancy Jo Hooper (Nancy Ann Harrison) (July 17, 1943 – November 15, 2012) was an American model who was Playboy magazine's Playmate of the Month for its February 1964 issue. Her centerfold was photographed by Pompeo Posar. In a sidebar commentary in The Playmate Book, Posar revealed that he discovered that Nancy Jo was still a virgin in the midst of the Playboy photoshoot when he asked her for "a little bit more sexy look" and she replied, "I don't know anything about sex!"

Although her Playmate article was titled "Georgia Peach", she was actually from Spartanburg, South Carolina and had won or placed as First Runner Up in a number of beauty pageants in the Old South region before her appearance in Playboy.

Nancy died on November 15, 2012, in Charleston, South Carolina, at the age of 69.

== March ==
Nancy Scott

Personal details
- Born: October 2, 1941 (age 84) Los Angeles, California, United States
- Height: 5 ft 6 in (1.68 m)

Nancy Scott (born October 2, 1941) is an American model who was Playboy magazine's Playmate of the Month for its March 1964 issue.

Her centerfold was photographed by Ron Vogel. She posed topless for the December 1979 Playboy pictorial "Playmates Forever!"

== April ==
Ashlyn Martin (Laura Lynn Hale)

Personal details
- Born: Laura Lynn Hale; March 20, 1946 London, England, UK
- Died: October 24, 1991 (aged 45)
- Height: 5 ft 5 in (1.65 m)

Laura Lynn Hale (March 20, 1946, in London, England – October 24, 1991), known by the stage name Ashlyn Martin, was an English model and actress who was Playboy magazine's Playmate of the Month for its April 1964 issue.

Her centerfold was photographed by Pompeo Posar and Mario Casilli. She also appeared in the July 1963 issue of Playboy. She also worked as a Bunny at the Chicago Playboy Club.

Laura died October 24, 1991, at the age of 45 from suicide.

== May ==
Terri Kimball

Personal details
- Born: October 5, 1944 (age 81) Fort Myers, Florida, U.S.
- Height: 5 ft 5 in (1.65 m)

Terri Kimball (born October 5, 1944, in Fort Myers, Florida) is an American model who was Playboy magazine's Playmate of the Month for its May 1964 issue.

Her centerfold was photographed by Pompeo Posar. She also worked at the Playboy Club in Chicago. Kimball's daughter Farrah Mancini also posed nude for Playboy.

== June ==
Lori Winston

Personal details
- Born: August 24, 1944 (age 81) Pasadena, California, US
- Height: 5 ft 2 1/2 in (1.59 m)

Lori Winston (born August 24, 1944, in Pasadena, California) is an American model who was Playboy magazine's Playmate of the Month for its June 1964 issue.

Her centerfold was photographed by Edmund Leja. she was 19 years old at the time of her centerfold.

She was the eldest of six children (two brothers and three sisters) and grew up in Los Angeles, California. Her father was a captain in the Los Angeles Fire Department. She studied art at California State University, Los Angeles and worked as a secretary at an insurance company.

== July ==
Melba Ogle

Personal details
- Born: November 13, 1942 (age 83) Cheyenne, Wyoming, US
- Height: 5 ft 2 in (1.57 m)

Melba Ogle (born November 13, 1942) is an American model. She is best known as Playboy magazine's Playmate of the Month for its July 1964 issue.

Her centerfold was photographed by Mario Casilli.

According to The Playmate Book, today she and her longtime husband live in Las Vegas, where they run a business that produces customized lapel pins.

== August ==
China Lee

Personal details
- Born: September 2, 1942 (age 83) New Orleans, Louisiana, US
- Height: 5 ft 4.5 in (1.64 m)

China Lee (born September 2, 1942) is an American model and actress. She was Playboy's Playmate of the Month for the August 1964 issue. Her centerfold was photographed by Pompeo Posar. She was the first Asian American Playmate.

== September ==
Astrid Schulz

Personal details
- Born: Astrid Schultz; 12 September 1939 Heemstede, North Holland, The Netherlands
- Died: 8 September 2012 (aged 72)
- Height: 5 ft 7 in (1.70 m)

Astrid Schultz (12 September 1939 – 8 September 2012), known as Astrid Schulz, was a Dutch model and actress who was Playboy magazine's Playmate of the Month for the September 1964 issue.

Astrid was the first Dutch-born Playmate to appear in the American edition of Playboy. Her centerfold was photographed by Mario Casilli. She died on 8 September 2012, at the age of 72.

== October ==
Rosemarie Hillcrest

Personal details
- Born: Rosemary Grayson; January 5, 1943 (age 83) Exeter, Devon, England, UK
- Height: 5 ft 6 in (1.68 m)

Rosemarie Hillcrest (born January 5, 1943, as Rosemary Grayson in Exeter, Devon, England, United Kingdom), is a British model who is best known as Playboy's Playmate of the Month for October 1964 under the name "Rosemarie Hillcrest". According to The Playmate Book, Rosemarie was discovered by Playboy through unusual means: she needed an interview with a millionaire for the college newspaper she was writing for, so she traveled to the United States and went to the Playboy Mansion in Chicago where she persuaded Hugh Hefner to agree to an interview. During the interview, he asked her if she would be interested in becoming a Playmate. She has a brief appearance in the rowing galley scene in The Magic Christian.

Rosemarie is also noteworthy for having the largest natural breast measurements of any Playmate, 41-inches.

After her Playboy appearance, Grayson served as a magistrate in England and later moved to North Wales with her now-deceased husband. As of 2006, she runs a public relations firm from her home.

== November ==
Kai Brendlinger

Personal details
- Born: September 8, 1943 (age 82) Minneapolis, Minnesota
- Height: 5 ft 3 in (1.60 m)

Kai Brendlinger (born September 8, 1943, in Minneapolis, Minnesota) was Playboy magazine's Playmate of the Month for the November 1964 issue.

Her centerfold was photographed by Pompeo Posar. Brendlinger was working as a Bunny at the Chicago Playboy Club when she appeared in the magazine's "Bunnies of Chicago" pictorial of August 1964. Her Playmate layout was published a few months later.

== December ==
Jo Collins (Janet Canoy)

Playboy Playmate of the Year
- 1965
- Preceded by: Donna Michelle
- Succeeded by: Allison Parks

Personal details
- Born: Janet Canoy; August 5, 1945 (age 80) Lebanon, Oregon, United States
- Height: 5 ft 4 in (1.63 m)

Jo Collins (Born Janet Canoy, on August 5, 1945, in Lebanon, Oregon) is Playboy magazine's Playmate of the Month for December 1964 and Playmate of the Year for 1965.

Her original pictorial was photographed by Mario Casilli.

She was married to the baseball player Bo Belinsky for five years (1970 to 1975).

== See also ==
- List of people in Playboy 1960–1969

Sharon Rogers	Nancy Jo Hooper	Nancy Scott	Ashlyn Martin	Terri Kimball	Lori Winston
Melba Ogle	China Lee	Astrid Schulz	Rosemarie Hillcrest	Kai Brendlinger	Jo Collins
