= Christine Williams (model) =

British model, actress, artist (1945–2017)

- Christine Williams in The Monkees 1967

Playboy centerfold appearance
- October 1963
- Preceded by: Victoria Valentino
- Succeeded by: Terre Tucker

Personal details
- Born: January 7, 1945; Basingstoke, Hampshire, England
- Died: November 22, 2017 (aged 72)
- Height: 6 ft 0 in (1.83 m)

Christine Williams (January 7, 1945 – November 22, 2017) was a model, actress and artist who was Playboy magazine's Playmate of the Month for its October 1963 issue. Her centerfold was photographed by Mario Casilli. She was born in Basingstoke, England.

== Filmography ==
=== Films ===
- Funny Girl (1968) (uncredited) .... Ziegfeld Girl
- Otto und die nackte Welle (1968) .... Model
- The Swinger (1966) (uncredited) .... Model #7
- The Naked World of Harrison Marks (1965) .... Herself
- For Those Who Think Young (1964)

=== Television ===
- The Monkees (1967) – Jan in S2:E10, "The Wild Monkees"
- "The Beverly Hillbillies"
  - "Jethro's Pad" (1966) .... First Kitty Kat
  - "Brewster's Baby" (1966) .... Kitty Kat Showgirl
- "Petticoat Junction" - "The Windfall" (1966) .... First Showgirl
- "Burke's Law" - "Who Killed Cynthia Royal?" (1963) .... Chorus Girl

== See also ==
- List of people in Playboy 1960–1969

Judi Monterey	Toni Ann Thomas	Adrienne Moreau	Sandra Settani	Sharon Cintron	Connie Mason
Carrie Enwright	Phyllis Sherwood	Victoria Valentino	Christine Williams	Terre Tucker	Donna Michelle
