= List of Playboy Playmates of 1965 =

The following is a list of Playboy Playmates of 1965. Playboy magazine names their Playmate of the Month each month throughout the year.

== January ==
Sally Duberson

Personal details
- Born: October 23, 1942 (age 84) New York City, New York, U.S.
- Height: 5 ft 5 in (165 cm)

Sally Duberson (born October 23, 1942) is an American model. She was Playboy magazine's Playmate of the Month for the January 1965 issue. Her centerfold was photographed by Pompeo Posar.

== February ==
Jessica St. George

Personal details
- Born: October 13, 1946 (age 80) Los Angeles, California, U.S.
- Height: 5 ft 5 in (165 cm)

Jessica St. George (born October 13, 1946) was Playboy magazine's Playmate of the Month for the February 1965 issue. Her centerfold was photographed by Mario Casilli. St. George was the first Greek American to become a Playmate.

== March ==
Jennifer Jackson

Personal details
- Born: February 6, 1945 (age 81) Chicago, Illinois, U.S.
- Height: 5 ft 8 in (173 cm)

Jennifer Jackson (born February 6, 1945) is an American model who was chosen as Playboy magazine's Playmate of the month for its March 1965 issue. She was the first Black Playmate of the Month, and she was photographed by Pompeo Posar.

== April ==
Sue Williams

Personal details
- Born: Karen Sue Hamilton; May 13, 1945 (age 81) Glendale, California, U.S.
- Height: 4 ft 11 in (150 cm)

Sue Williams (born May 13, 1945 as Karen Sue Hamilton) is an American actress and Playboy magazine's Playmate of the Month for April 1965.

Her centerfold was photographed by Ed DeLong and William V. Figge. According to Playboy, she was the first Playmate to have breast implants and the first who was less than five feet tall (152 cm), at just 4'11 (150cm).

== May ==
Maria McBane

Personal details
- Born: February 8, 1946 (age 80) Avignon, France
- Height: 5 ft 3 in (160 cm)

Maria McBane (born February 8, 1946) is a French American model and actress who was Playboy magazine's Playmate of the Month for its May 1965 issue.

Her centerfold was photographed by Ed DeLong and William Figge.

== June ==
Hedy Scott

Personal details
- Born: January 24, 1946 (age 80) Jodoigne, Walloon Brabant, Wallonia, Belgium
- Height: 5 ft 5.5 in (166 cm)

Hedy Scott (born January 24, 1946) is a Belgian-American model and actress who was Playboy magazine's Playmate of the Month for its June 1965 issue.

Her centerfold was photographed by Ron Vogel. She went on to have a brief acting career, appearing in Fireball 500 (1966) and an episode of The Munsters.

== July ==
Gay Collier

Personal details
- Born: October 9, 1942 (age 84) New Orleans, Louisiana, U.S.
- Height: 5 ft 5 in (165 cm)

Gay Collier (born October 9, 1942) is an American model and actress who was Playboy magazine's Playmate of the Month for its July 1965 issue.

Her centerfold was photographed by Mario Casilli.

== August ==
Lannie Balcom

Personal details
- Born: Linda K. Balcom; March 17, 1941 Clarkdale, Arizona, U.S.
- Died: April 25, 1991 (aged 50) Dillon, Montana, Beaverhead County, Montana, U.S.
- Height: 5 ft 6 in (168 cm)

Lannie Balcom (born Linda K. Balcom; March 17, 1941 – April 25, 1991) was an American model and actress. She was Playboy magazine's Playmate of the Month for its August 1965 issue.

Her centerfold was photographed by J. Barry O'Rourke. She was also a Playboy Bunny at the Chicago club.

Balcom died on April 25, 1991, at the age of 50.

== September ==
Patti Reynolds

Personal details
- Born: May 28, 1948 (age 78) Chicago, Illinois, U.S.
- Height: 5 ft 5 in (165 cm)

Patti Reynolds (born May 28, 1948) is an American model and actress who was Playboy magazine's Playmate of the Month for its September 1965 issue.

Her centerfold was photographed by Stan Malinowski.

== October ==
Allison Parks
- Preceded by: Patti Reynolds
- Succeeded by: Pat Russo

Playboy Playmate of the Year
- 1966

Personal details
- Born: Gloria Sharlene Waldron; October 18, 1941 Glendale, California, U.S.
- Died: June 21, 2010 (aged 68) Hawaii, U.S.
- Height: 5 ft 6 in (168 cm)

Allison Parks (born Gloria Sharlene Waldron; October 18, 1941 – June 21, 2010) was an American model and actress who was Playboy magazine's Playmate of the Month for October, 1965 and Playmate of the Year for 1966. Her original pictorial was photographed by William Figge.

She settled in Pacific Palisades, Los Angeles, and died of heart failure while on holiday in Hawaii on June 21, 2010 aged 68.

== November ==
Pat Russo

Personal details
- Born: October 5, 1941 (age 85) Morristown, New Jersey, U.S.
- Height: 5 ft 7 in (170 cm)

Pat Russo (born October 5, 1941) is an American model who was Playboy magazine's Playmate of the Month for its November 1965 issue. Her centerfold was photographed by Pompeo Posar.

== December ==
Dinah Willis

Personal details
- Born: August 5, 1945 (age 81) Odessa, Texas, U.S.
- Height: 5 ft 8 in (173 cm)

Dinah Willis (born August 5, 1945) is an American model who was Playboy magazine's Playmate of the Month for its December 1965 issue. Her centerfold was photographed by Pompeo Posar. She was also on the cover of the 1966 Playboy calendar.

== See also ==
- List of people in Playboy 1960–1969

Sally Duberson	Jessica St. George	Jennifer Jackson	Sue Williams	Maria McBane	Hedy Scott
Gay Collier	Lannie Balcom	Patti Reynolds	Allison Parks	Pat Russo	Dinah Willis
