= Allison Parks =

American actress and model (1943–2010)

Playboy centerfold appearance
- October 1965
- Preceded by: Patti Reynolds
- Succeeded by: Pat Russo

Playboy Playmate of the Year
- 1966
- Preceded by: Jo Collins
- Succeeded by: Lisa Baker

Personal details
- Born: Gloria Sharlene Waldron; October 18, 1941; Glendale, California, U.S.
- Died: June 21, 2010 (aged 68); Hawai'i, U.S.
- Height: 5 ft 6 in (168 cm)

Allison Parks (born Gloria Sharlene Waldron; October 18, 1941 – June 21, 2010) was an American model and actress. She was chosen as Playboy magazine's Playmate of the Month in October 1965, and Playmate of the Year for 1966, appearing as the cover model and in a pictorial in the May issue. She was also in a Playboy Mansion pictorial in the January 1966 issue of Playboy, along with Ashlyn Martin. Her original pictorial was photographed by William Figge.

== Career ==
"Allison Parks" was a pseudonym she used when modelling for Playboy. She told The Playmate Book that she liked it so much, she kept it as her professional name. She was a mother at the time of her centerfold, and her kids were featured in a photo in her layout, but they were identified as swimming school students.

After her Playmate work, Parks went on to a long career as a model and actress, mostly in TV commercials.

== Death ==
Parks died of heart failure while on vacation in Hawai'i, at the age of 68.

== See also ==
- List of people in Playboy 1960–1969

| Sally Duberson | Jessica St. George | Jennifer Jackson | Sue Williams | Maria McBane | Hedy Scott |
| Gay Collier | Lannie Balcom | Patti Reynolds | Allison Parks | Pat Russo | Dinah Willis |
