= Cynthia Myers =

American film actress and model (1950–2011)

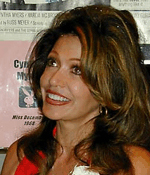
- Myers in the 2000s

Playboy centerfold appearance
- December 1968
- Preceded by: Paige Young
- Succeeded by: Leslie Bianchini

Personal details
- Born: September 12, 1950 Toledo, Ohio, U.S.
- Died: November 4, 2011 (aged 61) Los Angeles, California, U.S.
- Height: 5 ft 3 in (1.60 m)

Cynthia Jeanette Myers (September 12, 1950 – November 4, 2011) was an American model, actress, and Playboy magazine's Playmate of the Month for the December 1968 issue.

== Career ==
Myers was born in Toledo, Ohio, and attended Woodward High School. She began getting modeling offers when she was fourteen years old. Many people suggested to her that she should model for Playboy. According to Myers, she was 13 when her breasts began to develop, and when she was fifteen she submitted some photographs to Playboy. Her bust had reached size 39 DD by the time the photoshoot for the magazine took place in June 1968. Myers was the first Playboy Playmate born in the 1950s when she appeared in the magazine in December 1968. The pictures were taken when she was 17 years old, but it was Playboy's policy at that time to wait until a Playmate turned 18 before her pictures would be published. In the meantime she moved into an apartment at the Playboy Mansion in Chicago and worked at the Chicago Playboy Club. At the mansion she met attendees from the 1968 Democratic National Convention in Chicago.

Her pictorial, released in December 1968, was taken in front of the Toledo Art Museum and was titled "Wholly Toledo!" because of Myers's hometown and her large breasts. She appeared on the cover and in the centerfold, which was photographed by Pompeo Posar. Her appearance in Playboy magazine took place during the Vietnam War. She quickly became a favorite of the American troops serving in Vietnam, receiving many letters from them and trying to answer them all. Her centerfold appears in the 1987 film Hamburger Hill and in the 1989 film The Siege of Firebase Gloria.

After her magazine debut, she carried out a promotional tour for Playboy and then returned to school, after which she had a number of jobs, including being an usher at a movie theater. She met Burt Lancaster who introduced her to Sydney Pollack, leading to her having a small uncredited role in They Shoot Horses, Don't They? (1969). She also made frequent appearances on Hugh Hefner's Playboy After Dark TV series in 1969. She joined the Actors And Directors Lab in Beverly Hills and studied there with Bruce Dern. She took the leading role of the sensitive bisexual rock and roll singer and bass player Casey Anderson in Russ Meyer's Beyond the Valley of the Dolls (1970). She followed this with a supporting role in the Western, Molly and Lawless John (1972). She subsequently retired from film-making, partly due to repeated requests for her to appear in nude scenes.

She appeared in the 1970, 1971, and 1972 Playmate Calendars and was also voted No. 10 “Playmate of the Century” in a Playboy poll carried out in the year 2000.

In 1994, it became known that a nude photo of Myers (along with fellow playmates Angela Dorian, Reagan Wilson and Leslie Bianchini) was scanned and inserted into Apollo 12 extra-vehicular activity astronaut cuff checklists by the Apollo 12 backup crew (Dave Scott, Jim Irwin, Al Worden) at NASA.

Myers married an Air Force pilot whom she met on a fishing trip and moved to California. She continued to model, and ran a website featuring her work.

In 2009, Myers became a spokeswoman for Schlitz beer. Her image was displayed on billboards and in grocery stores and bars as part of 60s-themed marketing campaign.

== Bill Cosby ==
Sometime after 1997, Myers provided interviews for the book Centerfolds, which was released in 2015. In these undated interviews, she claimed she personally witnessed Bill Cosby "use drugs to have sex with women" at the Playboy Mansion, stating that his actions repulsed her so much she was unable to "shed a tear" when Cosby's son Ennis was murdered in 1997.

== Death ==
Myers died at age 61 on November 4, 2011.

== See also ==
- List of people in Playboy 1960–1969

Connie Kreski	Nancy Harwood	Michelle Hamilton	Gaye Rennie	Elizabeth Jordan	Britt Fredriksen
Melodye Prentiss	Gale Olson	Dru Hart	Majken Haugedal	Paige Young	Cynthia Myers
