= Sharon Clark =

American model and actress

Playboy centerfold appearance
- August 1970
- Preceded by: Carol Willis
- Succeeded by: Debbie Ellison

Playboy Playmate of the Year
- 1971
- Preceded by: Claudia Jennings
- Succeeded by: Liv Lindeland

Personal details
- Born: October 15, 1943 (age 81); Seminole, Oklahoma
- Height: 5 ft 6.5 in (169 cm)

Sharon Clark (born October 15, 1943, in Seminole, Oklahoma) is an American model and actress. She was Playboy Playmate of the Month for August 1970. She was selected as the Playmate of the Year for 1971. Her centerfold was photographed by William Figge and Ed DeLong.

== Career ==
In 1971, at age 27, she became the oldest Playmate of the Year, a record she held for 15 years, until Miss May 1985 Kathy Shower became PMOY 1986 at age 33.

Clark started appearing in films and on television in the late 1970s. She was also a Playboy Bunny at the St. Louis club.

== Filmography ==
- The Uninvited (1996) (TV)
- Beyond Suspicion (1993) (TV) .... Waitress
- For the Very First Time (1991) (TV) .... Kathy
- Lisa (1990) .... Porsche Passenger
- The Long Journey Home (1987) (TV) .... Policewoman
- The Little Dragons (1980) (as Sharon Weber) .... Ruth Forbinger
- CHiPs - "The Strippers" (1980) (as Sharon Weber) .... Shari Johns
- The Billion Dollar Hobo (1977) .... Jen
- Charlie's Angels - "The Las Vegas Connection" (1977) (as Sharon Weber) .... Leora
- Lifeguard (1976) (as Sharon Weber) .... Tina

== See also ==
- List of people in Playboy 1970–79

Jill Taylor	Linda Forsythe	Chris Koren	Barbara Hillary	Jennifer Liano	Elaine Morton
Carol Willis	Sharon Clark	Debbie Ellison	Mary and Madeleine Collinson	Avis Miller	Carol Imhof
