= Jo Collins =

American model and actress (1945–2010)

Playboy centerfold appearance
- December 1964
- Preceded by: Kai Brendlinger
- Succeeded by: Sally Duberson

Playboy Playmate of the Year
- 1965
- Preceded by: Donna Michelle
- Succeeded by: Allison Parks

Personal details
- Born: August 5, 1945 Lebanon, Oregon, U.S.
- Died: 2010 (aged 64–65) Chicago, Illinois, U.S.
- Height: 5 ft 4 in (1.63 m)

Janet Canoy (August 5, 1945 – 2010), known professionally as Jo Collins, was an American actress and model who was named as Playmate of the Month for December 1964 and was later named 1965's Playmate of the Year. Her original pictorial was photographed by Mario Casilli.

== Life and career ==
Collins was discovered by Playboy while working as a page for the Queen for a Day TV game show. She went on to work at the Playboy Club as a Bunny and later as a Bunny Mother.

Collins, who was of Norwegian and Spanish descent, was married to baseball player Bo Belinsky for five years (1970 to 1975).

She was nicknamed "G.I. Jo" for her United Service Organizations tours to entertain the troops during the Vietnam War. She first went to Vietnam to meet 2LT Jack Price of Company B, 2nd Battalion, 503rd Infantry, 173rd Airborne Brigade. Price sent to Hugh Hefner in November 1965 a letter purchasing a lifetime subscription to Playboy, for which the magazine promised that a Playmate would deliver the first issue personally. The letter requested Collins as the Playmate. Price was wounded in action on 3 January 1966, forcing Collins to reschedule the visit to before he was medically evacuated on 13 January. General Ellis W. Williamson named her an honorary Sky Soldier, and Company B renamed itself "Playboy Company".

In December 1979, Jo posed for the "Playmates Forever!" pictorial. In 1998, Jo reunited with Jack Price for an online interview with Playboy fans.

Collins died in Chicago, Illinois in 2010.

== Film and television appearances ==
- Fireball 500 (1966) .... Leander Fan
- Lord Love a Duck (1966) .... Kitten
- Sergeant Dead Head (1965) .... Gail
- How to Stuff a Wild Bikini (1965) .... Beach Girl
- Ski Party (1965) (uncredited) .... Jo

== See also ==
- List of people in Playboy 1960–1969

Sharon Rogers	Nancy Jo Hooper	Nancy Scott	Ashlyn Martin	Terri Kimball	Lori Winston
Melba Ogle	China Lee	Astrid Schulz	Rosemarie Hillcrest	Kai Brendlinger	Jo Collins
