= Patti Reynolds =

American model and actress (born 1948)

Playboy centerfold appearance
- September 1965
- Preceded by: Lannie Balcom
- Succeeded by: Allison Parks

Personal details
- Born: May 28, 1948 (age 76); Chicago, Illinois, U.S.
- Height: 5 ft 5 in (1.65 m)

Patti Reynolds (born May 28, 1948) is an American model and actress who was Playboy magazine's Playmate of the Month for its September 1965 issue (at the age of 17). Her centerfold was photographed by Stan Malinowski. She also appears in a photograph on page 56 dated 1960 (along with Ashlyn Martin and two other bunnies) in The Bunny Years by Kathryn Leigh Scott, for which she also wrote a short bio of herself.

Reynolds was born in Chicago, Illinois. In January 1966, she was subpoenaed by a Federal grand jury investigating the crime syndicate in Chicago. Also subpoenaed were reputed underworld figures Fiori (Fifi) Buccieri, 59, and Charles (Chuckie) English, 52. Reynolds was identified by Federal authorities as an intimate friend of Frank (the Horse) Buccieri, 52, the brother of Fiori.

== See also ==
- List of people in Playboy 1960–1969

Sally Duberson	Jessica St. George	Jennifer Jackson	Sue Williams	Maria McBane	Hedy Scott
Gay Collier	Lannie Balcom	Patti Reynolds	Allison Parks	Pat Russo	Dinah Willis
