= June Cochran =

American beauty pageant contestant and model

June Cochran Englehart

Playboy centerfold appearance
- December 1962
- Preceded by: Avis Kimble
- Succeeded by: Judi Monterey

Playboy Playmate of the Year
- 1963
- Preceded by: Christa Speck
- Succeeded by: Donna Michelle

Personal details
- Born: February 20, 1943 Jefferson County, Tennessee, U.S.
- Died: May 21, 2004 (aged 61) Madison, Wisconsin, U.S.
- Height: 5 ft 2 in (157 cm)

June Cochran Englehart (February 20, 1943 – May 21, 2004) was an American model and beauty queen. She was Miss December 1962 and was later named 1963's Playmate of the Year.

== Biography ==
Cochran was born in East Tennessee and moved to Indianapolis, Indiana after her sophomore year in high school. She won the Miss Indiana USA pageant in 1960, but was unplaced at the national competition. She was also Miss Indiana World 1962, but unplaced at Miss USA World 1962.

She later was Playboy magazine's Playmate of the Month for its December 1962 issue, and Playmate of the Year for 1963. Her original pictorial was photographed by Don Bronstein.

She was also a Playboy Bunny at the Chicago club.

Cochran died in Madison, Wisconsin, at the age of 61.

== See also ==
- List of people in Playboy 1960–1969

Merle Pertile	Kari Knudsen	Pamela Gordon	Roberta Lane	Marya Carter	Merissa Mathes
Unne Terjesen	Jan Roberts	Mickey Winters	Laura Young	Avis Kimble	June Cochran
