= Avis Kimble =

American model (born 1944)

Playboy centerfold appearance
- November 1962
- Preceded by: Laura Young
- Succeeded by: June Cochran

Personal details
- Born: October 18, 1944 (age 80); Chicago, Illinois
- Height: 5 ft 5 in (1.65 m)

Avis Kimble (born October 18, 1944) is an American model. At age 17 she was photographed by Jon Pownall to become Playboy magazine's Playmate of the Month for its November 1962 issue.

Avis was one of three finalists for that year's Playmate of the Year, and appeared on the cover of the January 1963 issue. June Cochran beat out Avis and Laura Young for the title. Kimble worked as a Bunny at the Chicago Playboy Club, and also ran a boutique in the Windy City at the same time.

She was one of the Editors' choices for the top ten Playmates of all time during Playboy's ten-year anniversary celebration. She did not make the top ten list when the readers' top ten was voted on.

== See also ==
- List of people in Playboy 1960–1969

Merle Pertile	Kari Knudsen	Pamela Gordon	Roberta Lane	Marya Carter	Merissa Mathes
Unne Terjesen	Jan Roberts	Mickey Winters	Laura Young	Avis Kimble	June Cochran
