= The Billion Dollar Hobo =

1977 film by Stuart E. McGowan

- The DVD cover of the film
- Directed by: Stuart E. McGowan
- Written by: Stuart E. McGowan; Tim Conway; Roger Beatty
- Produced by: Lang Elliott; Eric Weston
- Starring: Tim Conway; Will Geer
- Cinematography: Irv Goodnoff
- Edited by: Avrum Fine
- Music by: Michael Leonard
- Distributed by: International Picture Show Company
- Release date: November 1977
- Running time: 98 minutes
- Country: United States
- Language: English

The Billion Dollar Hobo is a 1977 American comedy film starring Tim Conway and Will Geer (in his last role).

== Plot ==
Conway is Vernon Praiseworthy, only heir to his uncle's fortune, who faced poverty and misfortune during the Great Depression but managed to build up his riches despite these hardships. To become eligible for the inheritance, Vernon must suffer as his uncle did by becoming a migrant hobo for a time. Soon after, Vernon and the dog sent to protect him are caught up in a dognapping scheme.

== Cast ==
- Tim Conway as Vernon Praiseworthy
- Will Geer as Choo Choo Trayne
- Eric Weston as Steve
- Sydney Lassick as Mitchell
- John Myhers as Leonard Cox
- Frank Sivero as Ernie
- Sharon Clark as Jen
- Victoria Carroll as Barbara Henderson
- Sheela Tessler as Rita
- Mickey Morton as Kotch
- Roger Barkley as Guard#2
- Al Lohman as Guard#1 (as Al Loehman)
- Kaye Elhardt as Miss Evans
- London the Wonder Dog as Bo

== Production notes ==
- Jimmie Rodgers sang the song in the film entitled "Half Sung Song".
- London the Wonder Dog would later star in the TV series The Littlest Hobo.
