= Willy & Scratch =

- Directed by: Robert J. Emery
- Written by: Robert J. Emery
- Produced by: Robert J. Emery
- Starring: Paul Vincent; Claudia Jennings; Michael Hatfield
- Cinematography: Paul Ruberstein
- Edited by: Robert J. Emery
- Music by: Kevin Kelly
- Production companies: American Pictures Corporation; Apollo Productions
- Distributed by: American Pictures Corporation
- Release dates: February 7, 1974 (Denmark); March 1975 (United States)
- Running time: 88 minutes
- Country: United States
- Language: English

Willy & Scratch (also known as Willie and Scratch) is a 1974 crime western drama film directed and written by Robert J. Emery and starring Paul Vincent, Claudia Jennings and Michael Hatfield. The film was the first film produced by American Pictures Corporation. It was also the first film distributed by Apollo Productions/Pictures operated by advertising and film executive Ron Libert.

== Plot ==
A pair of dangerous criminals make a desert ghost-town their hideout in the wake of a deadly heist.

== Cast ==
- Paul Vincent as Willy
- Claudia Jennings as Jennifer
- Michael Hatfield as Scratch

== Production ==
=== Filming ===
The film was shot in the abandoned Floridaland amusement park and in the Brooksville. The film was Jennings's first film lead.

=== Censorship ===
The film contained a significant amount of graphic content, including a scene in which actor Michael Hatfield was stabbed in the throat with a pitchfork and a rape scene featuring Claudia Jennings. To receive an R rating from the Motion Picture Association of America, 11 seconds of footage from the pitchfork scene were deleted.

== Release ==
The film was released theatrically on February 7, 1974, in Denmark and in the United States in March 1975 by American Pictures Corporation. The film was also shown on television between 1982 and 1987 but its survival status is currently unknown.

The interest of cinephile Joe Bob Briggs mentioning Willy & Scratch on his social media in 2020 (Twitter), inspired renewed interest in the film and the search for a print. In December 2024, the film review site Dawn of the Discs (Facebook) announced Joe Rubin’s film restoration and film distribution company, Vinegar Syndrome, found a print on eBay and is in the process of restoration.

== Sources ==
- Goble, Alan (1991). The International Film Index, 1895-1990: Film titles. Bowker-Saur. p. 929.
