= Jennifer Jackson (model) =

American model (born 1945)

Playboy centerfold appearance
- March 1965
- Preceded by: Jessica St. George
- Succeeded by: Sue Williams

Personal details
- Born: February 6, 1945 (age 80); Chicago, Illinois, U.S.
- Height: 5 ft 8 in (1.73 m)

Jennifer Jackson (born February 6, 1945) is an American model who was chosen as Playboy magazine's Playmate of the Month for the March 1965 issue. She was the first black Playmate of the Month and was photographed by Pompeo Posar. Jackson also worked as a Playboy Bunny in a Playboy Club.

== Personal life ==
Jennifer Jackson Greene is from the south side of Chicago and graduated from Emil G. Hirsch High School in 1963. She is the daughter of Clynell Jackson Sr. and Marjorie McGuire Jackson. She is an identical twin. She has eight siblings.

Jackson attended Loop College. She worked as a photographic, runway and advertising model, including as a model for Ebony Fashion Fair. Other than that, Jackson has been an active part of the movement for children's rights, working as an investigator for Child Protective Services, and according to The Playmate Book, she is now a social worker who lives in the Pacific Northwest with her husband. She has three children and three grandchildren.

Jackson's twin sister, Janis Jackson Holmes, was also a Playboy Bunny.

She appeared alongside Howard Stern in his "Cleveland Funeral" for competing radio stations after he became number one in the market.

== See also ==
- List of people in Playboy 1960–1969

Sally Duberson	Jessica St. George	Jennifer Jackson	Sue Williams	Maria McBane	Hedy Scott
Gay Collier	Lannie Balcom	Patti Reynolds	Allison Parks	Pat Russo	Dinah Willis
