= Marilyn Cole =

English model (born 1949)

Playboy centerfold appearance
- January 1972
- Preceded by: Karen Christy
- Succeeded by: P. J. Lansing

Playboy Playmate of the Year
- 1973
- Preceded by: Liv Lindeland
- Succeeded by: Cyndi Wood

Personal details
- Born: 7 May 1949 (age 77) Gosport, Hampshire, England
- Height: 5 ft 8 in (173 cm)

Marilyn Cole (born 7 May 1949) was Playboy magazine's Playmate of the Month for January 1972. She was the magazine's first full-frontal nude centerfold. (Note: Since her pubic hair was partly covered by the shadow cast from the book in her hand, Bonnie Large, the Playmate of the Month for March 1973, is often regarded as the first Playmate of the Month to appear clearly full frontal nude.) She was later named 1973's Playmate of the Year, becoming the only Briton to hold that title. Her original pictorial was photographed by Alexas Urba.

== Career ==
Cole worked at a Post Office punched card unit in Portsmouth Central Telephone Exchange, before working, for £12 weekly, at the Portsmouth Co-op Fuel Office, when she was interviewed to be a Playboy Bunny at the London Playboy Club. She worked as a bunny from 1971 to 1974, and, within a few days of starting work there, was noticed by Victor Lownes and test-photographed for the magazine. Marilyn also worked as a barmaid at the Auckland Arms Hotel in Southsea during the late 60s.

She appeared on the cover of the Roxy Music album Stranded, having been noticed by Bryan Ferry after winning Playmate of the Year. She had previously appeared on the covers of various Top of the Pops albums.

== Personal life ==
Following romantic connections with Anthony Simms in 1963, she married former Playboy executive Victor Lownes, over 20 years her senior, until his death in 2017, and now works as a journalist. Among the subjects she writes about is professional boxing, which she began covering in 2000.

Her interests include the tango, which she studied under Paul Pellicoro, and has partnered with actor Brian Cox.

== Filmography ==
- Playboy: 50 Years of Playmates (2004) (V)
- Forty Minutes (1990) TV Episode
- V.I.P.-Schaukel (1972) TV Episode

== Notes ==
Marilyn Cole	P. J. Lansing	Ellen Michaels	Vicki Peters	Deanna Baker	Debbie Davis
Carol O'Neal	Linda Summers	Susan Miller	Sharon Johansen	Lena Söderberg	Mercy Rooney
