= The Outside Man =

1972 film directed by Jacques Deray

- French film poster
- French: Un homme est mort
- Directed by: Jacques Deray
- Written by: Jacques Deray; Jean-Claude Carrière; Ian McLellan Hunter
- Produced by: Jacques Bar
- Starring: Jean-Louis Trintignant; Ann-Margret; Roy Scheider; Michel Constantin; Angie Dickinson
- Cinematography: Silvano Ippoliti; Terry K. Meade
- Edited by: William K. Chulack; Henri Lanoë
- Music by: Michel Legrand
- Production companies: Cité Films; General Production Company; Les Productions Artistes Associés; Mondial Televisione Film
- Distributed by: United Artists
- Release dates: 21 December 1972 (Italy); 18 January 1973 (France)
- Running time: 112 minutes 105 minutes (U.S. cut)
- Countries: France; Italy
- Languages: English; French

The Outside Man (French: Un homme est mort, lit. 'A man has died') is a 1972 neo-noir crime thriller film directed by Jacques Deray, from a screenplay co-written with Jean-Claude Carrière and Ian McLellan Hunter. This French and Italian co-production stars Jean-Louis Trintignant, Ann-Margret, Roy Scheider, Angie Dickinson, and Jackie Earle Haley in his film debut. The plot is about a French contract killer (Trintignant) who travels to Los Angeles for a hit, only to find himself targeted by unknown assailants.

== Plot ==
French hitman Lucien Bellon is hired to kill Kovacs, a major California mobster. Flying to Los Angeles, he checks into a hotel and drives out to the victim's luxurious home. Finding the man alone, he shoots him dead and makes his getaway. Back at the hotel, he discovers that his room has been stripped, including his passport and plane ticket. Emerging, he finds that he is being trailed by a hitman, who keeps trying to shoot him. To evade his pursuer, he takes a woman hostage and holes up in her apartment. On the TV news he sees the report of Kovacs' murder, but the description of the suspect does not fit him at all.

With only a gun and some money, and being pursued, he cannot survive long. He calls up his boss in Paris, Antoine, who tells him to find an old friend, Nancy, who works in a strip club. She hides him and organises a passport. When Lucien's pursuer, Lenny, finds the two of them in a motel, Lucien captures him and explains the situation. Lucien was hired to eliminate Kovacs and Lenny was hired to eliminate Lucien, but who hired them? The answer is clear: it was Kovacs' son, who has inherited his father's profitable empire and his trophy wife. The two agree to tackle young Kovacs, but fall out and Lenny is killed. Antoine arrives from Paris to attend old Kovacs' funeral, which ends in a shoot-out. Antoine kills young Kovacs, but is then shot dead by the police. Lucien gets away, but dies of gunshot wounds.

== Cast ==
- Jean-Louis Trintignant as Lucien Bellon
- Ann-Margret as Nancy Robson
- Angie Dickinson as Jackie Kovacs
- Roy Scheider as Lenny
- Georgia Engel as Mrs. Barnes
- Felice Orlandi as Anderson
- Carlo De Mejo as Karl
- Michel Constantin as Antoine
- Umberto Orsini as Alex
- Ted de Corsia as Victor
- Jackie Earle Haley as Eric
- John Hillerman as Department Store Manager
- Jon Korkes as First Hawk
- Connie Kreski as Rosie
- Ben Piazza as Desk Clerk
- Alex Rocco as Miller
- Talia Shire as Make-up Girl

== Production ==
Jacques Deray had Lino Ventura in mind for the lead role, but he wasn't considered a big enough star in the United States, so Jean-Louis Trintignant was hired thanks to his international caché from A Man and a Woman and The Conformist.

This was the film acting debut of then-11-year-old Jackie Earle Haley, and the final film role of Ted de Corsia before his death in April 1973.

== Release ==
The Outside Man was released in Italy on December 21, 1972 as Funerale a Los Angeles. It was released in France on January 17, 1973.

It was released in the United States in Rochester, New York, on August 17, 1973. For the American release, the film was cut by seven minutes.

=== Home media ===
The film released on a remastered Blu-ray by Kino Lorber in December 2023.

== Reception ==
=== Critical response ===
The film received mixed reviews from critics.

A review in Time Out reads "Jacques Deray's thrillers often go sadly astray, but this one was co-scripted by Jean-Claude Carrière (Buñuel's latter-day collaborator), and wittily fashions a dark variation on Through the Looking-Glass out of the hit man’s bafflement as he becomes the hunted in a country where he doesn’t understand the language (the dialogue is in English, with occasional subtitled French) and where tribal customs seem alarmingly bizarre."
