= Connie Kreski =

American model (1946–1995)

Playboy centerfold appearance
- January 1968
- Preceded by: Lynn Winchell
- Succeeded by: Nancy Harwood

Playboy Playmate of the Year
- 1969
- Preceded by: Angela Dorian
- Succeeded by: Claudia Jennings

Personal details
- Born: September 19, 1946 Wyandotte, Michigan, United States
- Died: March 21, 1995 (aged 48) Beverly Hills, California, United States
- Height: 5 ft 5 in (165 cm)

Connie Kreski (September 19, 1946 – March 21, 1995) was born Constance Joanne Kornacki. She was an American model and actress. In January 1968, Kreski posed in the centerfold as Playboy magazine's Playmate of the Month. She subsequently won Playmate of the Year honors for 1969. She was also Miss January 1969 in the Playboy calendar for that year and featured again in the 1970 calendar. Kreski briefly worked as a psychiatric care assistant at a hospital in Ann Arbor, Michigan before being discovered at a University of Michigan football game by a Playboy scout .

== Career ==
In April 1969, Kreski was signed by Anthony Newley to play the female lead in the Universal Pictures film Can Heironymus Merkin Ever Forget Mercy Humppe and Find True Happiness? The movie was shot in Malta and starred Milton Berle, Joan Collins, and George Jessel. She also appeared in The Trackers, (1971), The Outside Man (1972), and The Black Bird (1975).

In Europe, Kreski also got a name for being photographed by Frank Habicht. This German photographer memorably recorded Swinging London, including the time Kreski lived there.

== Personal life ==
Los Angeles Times writer Joyce Haber mentioned Kreski in a newspaper column just days after the murder of Sharon Tate by followers of Charles Manson. Kreski was a member of the murdered actress's social circle, and considered Sharon Tate, who was quite similar in physical appearance, a very close friend. Kreski was among those invited to the mansion Tate shared with her husband, director Roman Polanski, on the fatal night of August 9, 1969. Kreski penned an article for the Detroit Free Press discussing her immediate reaction to the death of Tate roughly a week after the incident. From 1971 to 1975, she was in a romantic relationship with James Caan.

== Death ==
Kreski died of a blocked carotid artery on March 21, 1995, in Beverly Hills, California.

== Filmography ==
- Lost Flight (1969) - Australian's Wife
- Can Hieronymus Merkin Ever Forget Mercy Humppe and Find True Happiness? (1969) - Mercy Humppe
- Ironside (1969) – "A Matter of Love and Death" as Arlene
- The Bold Ones - Waitress (one episode, 1969)
- Love, American Style (1970) TV episode - "Love and the V.I.P. Restaurant"
- The Trackers (1971, TV) - Becky Paxton
- The Outside Man (1972) - Rosie
- The Black Bird (1975) - Decoy Girl
- Captains and the Kings (1976) TV miniseries - Pearl Gray
- Aspen (1977, TV miniseries) - Jackie Camerovsky

== See also ==
- List of people in Playboy 1960–1969

Connie Kreski	Nancy Harwood	Michelle Hamilton	Gaye Rennie	Elizabeth Jordan	Britt Fredriksen
Melodye Prentiss	Gale Olson	Dru Hart	Majken Haugedal	Paige Young	Cynthia Myers
