= Budweiser girl =

Models promoting beer

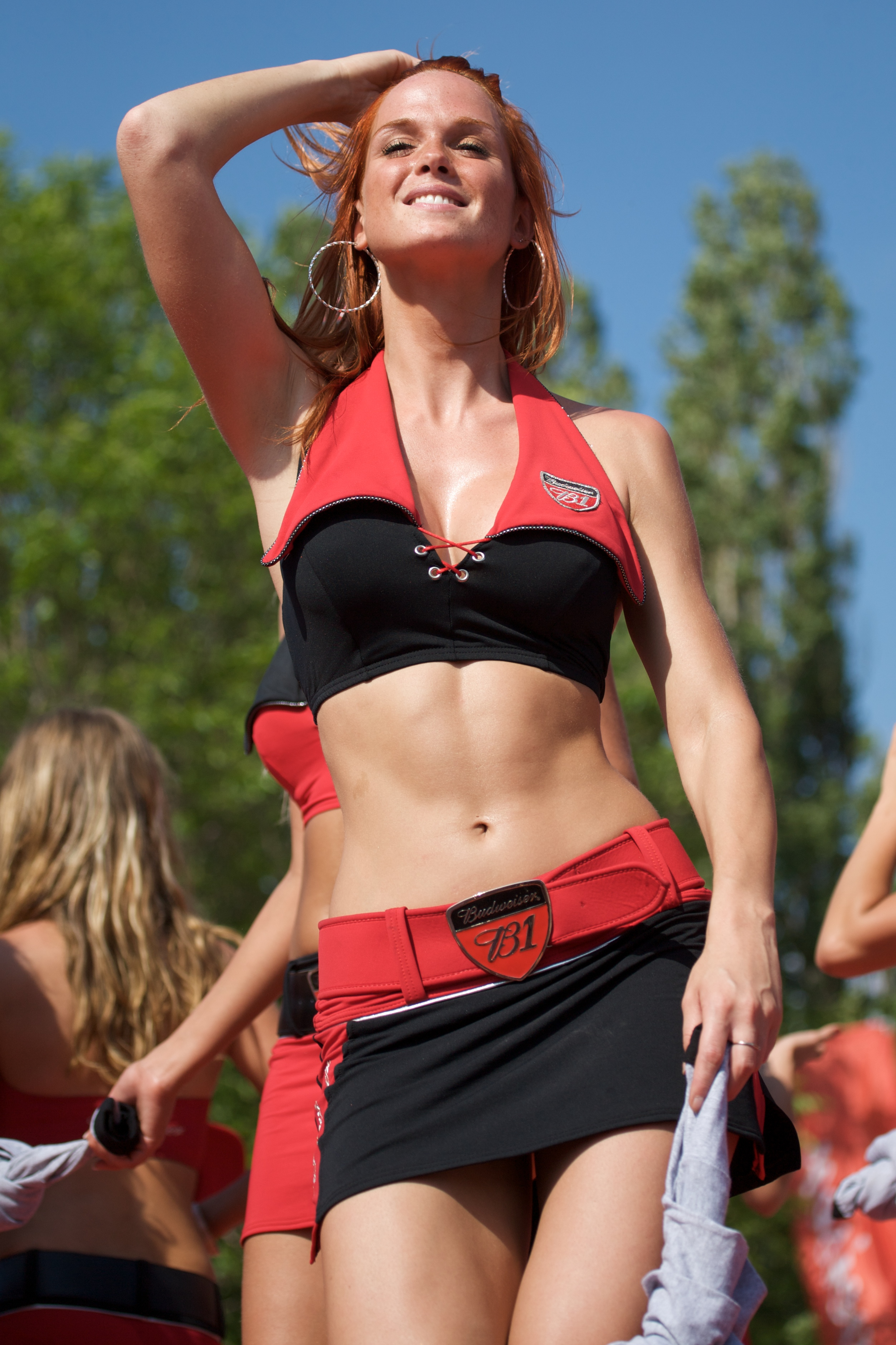
A "Bud girl" at a Canadian sporting event

The Budweiser girls (or Bud girls) are female models promoting Budweiser beer for Anheuser-Busch. The first Budweiser girl appeared in 1883.

At various times, the company featured Budweiser girls in television and print advertisements, and hired local models to visit bars in costume for in-person promotions. Throughout their history, the Bud Girls have been attractive but cleancut. "A Bud Girl doesn’t smoke, swear, use drugs, or have tattoos, non-ear piercings, or a criminal record." During the 1990s, Anheuser-Busch distributors hired college girls to promote Budweiser on campus and to college bars.
