= William Figge =

American photographer (1919–1976)

- Born: William Vassar Figge; March 25, 1919; Iowa, U.S.
- Died: May 1976 (aged 57); Glendale, California, U.S.
- Education: University of Southern California
- Occupation: Photographer
- Spouse: Melba Lacayo (m. 1945)
- Children: 4

William Vassar Figge (March 25, 1919 – May 1976) was an American photographer who, along with his wife Melba, ran a photography studio in Glendale, California.

== Biography ==
Figge was a combat photographer in World War II. After the war, he failed to find work as a cinematographer, so he stayed with photography and specialised in portraiture, shooting weddings and contributing to Playboy magazine. Notably, he discovered many Playmates at weddings. Bill Figge, as he is sometimes called, shot 48 gatefolds and 3 covers. The couple ceased contributing to Playboy when the magazine became more risqué in the 1980s.

Bill and Melba had three sons, (Greg, Stephan and Eric,) and one daughter (Leslie). Greg and Leslie run the studio that their parents began, Figge Studios. Eric, the only child to have formal education in photography, photographs architecture professionally.

Figge died in Glendale, California, at the age of 57.

== Playboy centerfolds ==
- April 1965 - Sue Williams
- May 1965 - Maria McBane
- October 1965 - Allison Parks
- 1966 Playmate of Year - Allison Parks
- June 1966 - Kelly Burke
- July 1966 - Tish Howard
- November 1966 - Lisa Baker
- July 1967 - Heather Ryan
- 1967 Playmate of Year - Lisa Baker
- November 1967 - Kaya Christian
- December 1967 - Lynn Winchell
- February 1968 - Nancy Harwood
- March 1968 - Michelle Hamilton
- April 1968 - Gaye Rennie
- September 1968 - Dru Hart
- February 1969 - Lorrie Menconi
- April 1969 - Lorna Hopper
- July 1969 - Nancy McNeil
- January 1970 - Jill Taylor
- March 1970 - Chris Koren
- June 1970 - Elaine Morton
- August 1970 - Sharon Olivia Clark
- 1971 Playmate of Year - Sharon Olivia Clark
- June 1972 - Debbie Davis
- August 1972 - Linda Summers
- March 1973 - Bonnie Large
- August 1973 - Phyllis Coleman
- October 1973 - Valerie Lane
- March 1974 - Pamela Zinszer
- September 1975 - Mesina Miller
- May 1979 - Michele Drake
