= Liv Lindeland =

Norwegian model and actress (born 1945)

Playboy centerfold appearance
- January 1971
- Preceded by: Carol Imhof
- Succeeded by: Willy Rey

Playboy Playmate of the Year
- 1972
- Preceded by: Sharon Clark
- Succeeded by: Marilyn Cole

Personal details
- Born: 7 December 1945 (age 80) Norway
- Height: 1.71 m (5 ft 7 in)

Liv Lindeland (born 7 December 1945) is a Norwegian former model and actress. She was chosen as Playboy magazine's Playmate of the Month for January 1971 and as the Playmate of the Year for 1972. Her original pictorial was photographed by Alexas Urba. Lindeland is the daughter-in-law of actress-dancer Cyd Charisse.

== Career ==
When the blonde Lindeland was selected to pose for Playboy she became the first Playmate of the Month to show clearly visible pubic hair in the magazine.

Lindeland went into acting following her Playboy appearance (often credited as Liv Von Linden), and then segued into a career as a talent agent. She again posed nude for Playboy in the December 1979 pictorial, "Playmates Forever!"

== Filmography ==
- Evel Knievel (1971)
- Save the Tiger (1973)
- Dirty O'Neil (1974)
- The Photographer (1975)
- Win, Place or Steal (1975)
- Picasso Trigger (1988)
- Guns (1990)

== See also ==
- List of people in Playboy 1970–1979

Liv Lindeland	Willy Rey	Cynthia Hall	Chris Cranston	Janice Pennington	Lieko English
Heather Van Every	Cathy Rowland	Crystal Smith	Claire Rambeau	Danielle de Vabre	Karen Christy
