= Claudia Jennings =

American actress and model (1949–1979)

- Jennings in 1974

Playboy centerfold appearance
- November 1969
- Preceded by: Jean Bell
- Succeeded by: Gloria Root

Playboy Playmate of the Year
- 1970
- Preceded by: Connie Kreski
- Succeeded by: Sharon Clark

Personal details
- Born: Mary Eileen Chesterton; December 20, 1949 Saint Paul, Minnesota, U.S.
- Died: October 3, 1979 (aged 29) Malibu, California, U.S.
- Height: 5 ft 6 in (1.68 m)

Mary Eileen Chesterton (December 20, 1949 – October 3, 1979), known professionally as Claudia Jennings, was an American actress and model. Jennings was Playboy magazine's Playmate of the Month for November 1969, later becoming Playmate of the Year for 1970. She subsequently pursued a career in acting, becoming known as the "Queen of the B movies". She died in an automobile accident at age 29 in 1979.

== Career ==
Mary Eileen Chesterton (known as "Mimi" to friends and family) was born in Saint Paul, Minnesota, in 1949, later moving to Milwaukee, Wisconsin, and then Richmond, Indiana. When her family moved from Richmond to Evanston, Illinois, as a result of her father becoming the advertising director with Skilsaw, she transferred at the start of her sophomore year to Evanston Township High School (ETHS) where she graduated in 1968. She was featured in a silent, plotless movie titled after her nickname which was shot on Super 8 film by fellow ETHS classmate Todd McCarthy. She worked as a receptionist at Playboy and then posed for the magazine in 1969. She adopted the name Claudia Jennings because she did not want to embarrass her family and that she thought "Mimi" sounded too girlish. Her original pictorial was photographed by Pompeo Posar. She was Playmate of the Year in 1970, and was awarded a pink Mercury Capri.

After her appearances in Playboy, Jennings became an actress in exploitation movies and in television. In 1973, she had a guest appearance on The Brady Bunch episode titled "Adios, Johnny Bravo". Jennings was widely rumored to be in line for the role as Kate Jackson's replacement on the hit television show Charlie's Angels, but the role was awarded to Shelley Hack.

== Death ==
On October 3, 1979, Jennings died in a head-on automobile collision on the Pacific Coast Highway near Malibu, California, when her VW convertible drifted across the center line into the path of an oncoming pickup truck. She was 29. Although she had struggled with a cocaine addiction in the past, an autopsy found no traces of drugs or alcohol in her system. Investigators concluded that the circumstances of the crash were consistent with her falling asleep at the wheel.

Jennings was featured in a 2000 episode of E! True Hollywood Story in which several of her friends and acquaintances were interviewed. The episode was made without the cooperation of her family, who considered the show too "tabloid" in style.

== Filmography ==
=== Film ===
Year	Title	Role
1971	Jud	Sunny
1971	The Love Machine	Darlene
1972	Trampa mortal	
1972	The Stepmother	Rita
1972	Unholy Rollers	Karen Walker
1973	Group Marriage	Elaine
1973	40 Carats	Gabriella
1974	Willy & Scratch	Jennifer
1974	Truck Stop Women	Rose
1974	The Single Girls	Allison
1974	'Gator Bait	Desiree Thibodeau
1976	The Man Who Fell to Earth	Mrs. Peters
1976	Sisters of Death	Judy
1976	The Great Texas Dynamite Chase	Candy Morgan
1977	Moonshine County Express	Betty Hammer
1978	Deathsport	Deneer
1979	Fast Company	Sammy

=== Television ===
Year	Title	Role	Episode
1971	Ironside	Maralyn	"The Professionals"
1973	Barnaby Jones	Denise Frazer	"To Denise, with Love and Murder"
1973	The Brady Bunch	Tami Cutler	"Adios, Johnny Bravo"
1974	The F.B.I.	Judith Grinnell	"Deadly Ambition"
1974	Cannon	Leona Wilson / Susan Williams	"Bobby Loved Me", "Lady in Red"
1974	The Manhunter	Peggy	"The Truck Murders"
1975	Movin' On	Ann	"Ransom"
1975	Caribe	Jean Benedict	"School for Killers"
1976	The Streets of San Francisco	Evie	"Underground"
1978	Lucan	Debbie Kern	"Nightmare"
1979	240-Robert	Barbara Rice	"Bank Job"

== See also ==
- List of people in Playboy 1960–1969
- List of people in Playboy 1970–1979

Leslie Bianchini	Lorrie Menconi	Kathy MacDonald	Lorna Hopper	Sally Sheffield	Helena Antonaccio
Nancy McNeil	Debbie Hooper	Shay Knuth	Jean Bell	Claudia Jennings	Gloria Root
