= Stan Malinowski =

American photographer (1936–2024)

Stanley Edward Malinowski Jr. (November 2, 1936 – March 4, 2024) was an American photographer known for his fashion photography.

== Background ==
Malinowski was the only child of Regina Grajewski (who returned to her maiden name after divorce) and Stanley Malinowski, Sr. He studied at Loyola University, Roosevelt University and Illinois Institute of Technology; majoring in engineering, psychology and photography. His instructors included Harry Callahan and Aaron Siskind.

Stan Malinowski died on March 4, 2024, at the age of 87.

== Career ==
Having grown up in Chicago, Playboy magazine seemed a natural fit for the budding photographer. "I brought some slides to Playboy, asked if I could return to show more and a month later walked away with my first assignment." Malinowski would move on to Penthouse magazine where he worked with Anna Wintour. While there, the art director at Vogue magazine, Rochelle Udell and Alexander Liberman saw his photos in Penthouse and brought him in to shoot a spread. This led to a thriving career in high fashion shooting for Harper's Bazaar magazine (including French and Italian editions), Vogue along with various perfume and make up ads. Malinowski photographed supermodels including Christie Brinkley, Cindy Crawford and Gia Carangi.

On November 1, 2008 a retrospective of his works was shown alongside artist and photographer Nick Azzaro. "From Fantasy to Fashion" showcased works beginning with Playboy covers in the 1960s and moving to his international photo shoots over the following 25 years. Subjects included Iman, Janice Dickinson, Kelly Le Brock and Andie MacDowell among others. The two-man show contrasted the fashion scene of past decades with current trends, highlighting shooting locations throughout Chicago.

== Influences ==
Malinowski claimed to have been influenced by Victor Skrebneski, Irving Penn, Richard Avedon, Bert Stern, Saul Leiter, Will McBride, Horn & Griner, Francis Giacobetti and Hans Feurer. He worked and resided in Chicago.
