= Victoria Vetri =

American model and actress (born 1944)

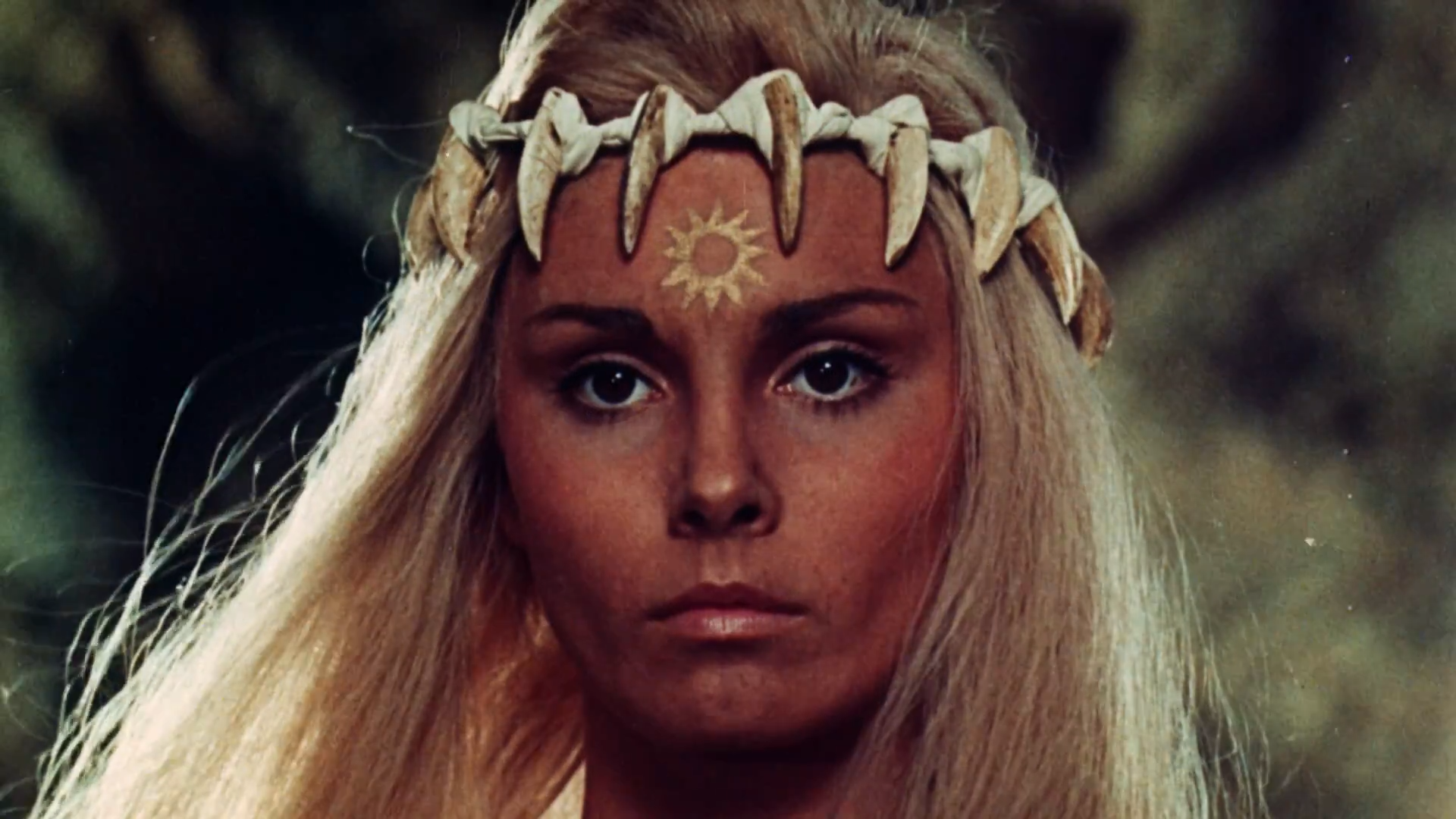
- Vetri in When Dinosaurs Ruled the Earth
- Born: Victoria Cecilia Vetri; September 26, 1944 (age 82); Los Angeles, California, U.S.
- Other name: Angela Dorian
- Occupations: Actress, model
- Years active: 1962–1975
- Spouse(s): Hugh Whettam (m. 1963; div. 1966) John Lee Hage (m. 1966; div. 1967) Heinz Gottfried Schwetz (m. 1978; div. 1983) Bruce Rathgeb (m. 1986; div. 2016)
- Children: 1

Victoria Cecilia Vetri (born September 26, 1944; also known as Angela Dorian and Victoria Rathgeb) is an American model and actress, she was named as Playmate of the Month for September 1967 and was later named 1968's Playmate of the Year .

== Early life and education ==
Vetri was born in Los Angeles, California, to Italian immigrant parents. She attended Hollywood High School between 1959 and 1963 and later studied art at Los Angeles City College. She began acting and modeling in her teens.

== Career ==
=== Television and film ===
While Vetri was in high school director Robert Wise considered casting her as Maria in the 1961 film West Side Story, but the studio selected Natalie Wood. In her early career Vetri often was cast in ethnic roles on television "due to her Italian heritage", such as a Native American in Cheyenne and a Mexican in Wagon Train. She also landed ethnic roles in film, including a member of an ancient Maya civilization in the 1963 film Kings of the Sun and a Mexican in the 1967 film Chuka.

Vetri appeared briefly in the 1968 film Rosemary's Baby, where she was credited as Angela Dorian. In one scene, Rosemary (Mia Farrow) remarks to Vetri's character, Terry Gionoffrio, that she resembles the actress Victoria Vetri.

In January 1969, Vetri signed a multi-picture contract with Warner Bros.-Seven Arts and was given a starring role in When Dinosaurs Ruled the Earth. She refused to have her hair turned blonde from its natural auburn for the film. The story required a blonde, so Vetri demanded a wig instead. Columnist Hy Gardner nominated Vetri as "a new sex symbol on the Hollywood horizon" in 1971. In her 70s in 2018, Vetri reportedly claimed she planned to return to acting.

=== Star Trek ===
Vetri has been incorrectly identified in numerous sources as playing the role of the "human form of a shape-shifting cat" in the Star Trek episode "Assignment: Earth" (a role actually played by April Tatro). Vetri emphatically states she never appeared on Star Trek, saying, "I was never in an episode of STAR TREK. I know that people think I was [...] I am not sure who she was. Look close enough and you can see that she has blue eyes and I, of course, have brown."

=== Playboy ===
Using the name Angela Dorian, Vetri was Playboy's Playmate of the Month for the September 1967 issue and subsequently was the 1968 Playmate of the Year. Vetri won $20,000 and a new car (an all pink 1968 AMC AMX) when she was selected Playmate of the Year. A nude photo of her (along with fellow playmates Leslie Bianchini, Reagan Wilson, and Cynthia Myers) was inserted into Apollo 12 Extra-vehicular activity astronaut cuff checklists by pranksters at NASA.

Thinking it would give her the pick of acting roles, Vetri took on modelling for Playboy. However, she said that posing actually hindered her career by limiting the roles she was offered. She felt she was typecast because of her beauty.

Vetri posed topless for the April 1984 Playboy pictorial Playmates Forever! Part Two. In Tom Clancy's 2004 biography of Gen. Tony Zinni, USMC (Ret.), Zinni remarks on receiving a copy of the September 1967 Playboy centerfold from his advisers for his birthday, which he kept as a memento of his time in Vietnam.

== Personal life ==
Vetri, aged 18, married Hugh Terry Whettam on April 7, 1963. Their son was born on September 8, 1963. They were divorced in 1966. She then married John Lee Hage on December 29, 1966, and they were divorced in 1967. Vetri married Heinz Gottfried Schwetz on November 13, 1978, and they were divorced on February 25, 1983. In 1986, she and Bruce Rathgeb were married; they divorced in 2016, during Vetri’s incarceration for her attempted manslaughter of Rathgeb.

Vetri was charged with attempted murder after shooting husband Bruce Rathgeb from close range inside the Hollywood apartment they were sharing after an argument on Saturday, October 16, 2010.

The Los Angeles Police Department's Hollywood Division arrested Vetri. She was jailed on US$1.53 million bail. Los Angeles Superior Court Judge Michael D. Abzug refused to reduce it, pending trial. In January 2011, the judge also denied her attorney's request for a reduction of the charge of attempted murder. She was ordered to stand trial on that charge.

Between January and September 2011, the charge against Vetri was reduced to attempted voluntary manslaughter. She entered a plea of no contest. The judge sentenced her to nine years in state prison. She was released on parole in April 2018, aged 73.

== Filmography ==
=== Film ===
Year	Title	Role	Notes
1962	The Pigeon That Took Rome		Role unknown
1963	Kings of the Sun	Ixzubin	
1967	Chuka	Helena Chavez	as Angela Dorian
1968	Rosemary's Baby	Terry Gionoffrio	as Angela Dorian
1970	When Dinosaurs Ruled the Earth	Sanna	
1973	Group Marriage	Jan	
1973	Invasion of the Bee Girls	Julie Zorn	

=== Television ===
Year	Title	Role	Notes
1962	The Adventures of Ozzie and Harriet	Member of wedding party (unconfirmed)	Season 11 Episode 1 "Rick and the Maid of Honor"
1962	Going My Way	Carmel	Season 1 Episode 4 "The Father"; as Angela Dorian
1962	Cheyenne	White Bird	Season 7 Episode 11 "Johnny Brassbuttons"; as Angela Dorian
1962	Hawaiian Eye	Kini	Season 4 Episode 9 "To See, Perchance to Dream"; as Angela Dorian
1962	The Gallant Men	Sister Catherine	Season 1 Episode 12 "A Place to Die"; as Angela Dorian
1963	The Gallant Men	Teresa Borrelli	Season 1 Episode 19 "Next of Kin"; as Angela Dorian
1964	Destry	Maiya	Season 1 Episode 9 "Ride to Rio Verde"; as Angela Dorian
1964	The Magical World of Disney	Senorita Margarita	2 episodes; as Angela Dorian
1964	The Bill Dana Show	Maria	Season 2 Episode 6 "Jose on the Ledge or the Crystal Room"; as Angela Dorian
1964-65	Wagon Train	Maria	2 episodes; as Angela Dorian
1965	McHale's Navy	Gina	Season 4 Episode 3 "Marriage, McHale Style"; as Angela Dorian
1965	Bonanza	Essie	Season 7 Episode 6 "Devil on Her Shoulder"; as Angela Dorian
1965	Perry Mason	Debbie Conrad	Season 9 Episode 14 "The Case of the Golden Girls"; as Angela Dorian
1966	Run for Your Life	Carmen	Season 1 Episode 16 "Carnival Ends at Midnight"; as Angela Dorian
1966	The Man from U.N.C.L.E.	Charisma Highcloud	Season 2 Episode 30 "The Indian Affairs Affair"; as Angela Dorian
1966	The Big Valley	Teresa	2 episodes; as Angela Dorian
1967	Hogan's Heroes	Carla	Season 3 Episode 1 "The Crittendon Plan"; as Angela Dorian
1967	Death Valley Days	Sacagawea	Season 16 Episode 5 "The Girl Who Walked the West"; as Angela Dorian
1968	Batman	Florence of Arabia	Season 3 Episode 23 "I'll Be a Mummy's Uncle"; as Angela Dorian
1969	The Courtship of Eddie's Father	Dolly Daly	Season 1 Episode 1 "Mrs. Livingston, I Presume"
1969	The Pigeon	Barbara Hagen	TV Movie 1h 30m
1970	Land of the Giants	Lisa	Season 2 Episode 23 "The Marionettes"
1970	Daniel Boone	Susan Pepper	Season 6 Episode 22 "Noblesse Oblige"
1970	Night Chase	Beverly Dorn	TV Movie
1970	Mission: Impossible	Eve Zembra	Season 5 Episode 12 "Squeeze Play"
1970	To Rome with Love	Christina	Season 2 Episode 14 "Doctor Andy"
1971	Incident In San Francisco	Ginger	TV Movie
1975	Lucas Tanner	Connie	Season 1 Episode 12 "Bonus Baby"
2022	Cursed Films	Self	Season 2 Episode 2 "Rosemary's Baby"

== See also ==
- List of people in Playboy 1960–1969

== Bibliography ==
- "Hollywood Picks Playmate Angela". The Cedar Rapids, Iowa Gazette. January 26, 1969. p. 69.
- "Miss Mooney Movie Stars Repeats Vows Following New Pattern". Lima, Ohio News. August 10, 1969. p. 12E.
- "Miss Dorian Makes Debut as Playmate". Long Beach, California Independent. April 11, 1968. p. 18.
- "AMX To Playmate". Long Beach Independent Press-Telegram. April 28, 1968. p. 81.
- "Southland Sunday". Long Beach Press-Telegram. March 7, 1971. p. 106.

Surrey Marshe	Kim Farber	Fran Gerard	Gwen Wong	Anne Randall	Joey Gibson
Heather Ryan	DeDe Lind	Angela Dorian	Reagan Wilson	Kaya Christian	Lynn Winchell
