= Mario Casilli =

American photographer (1931–2002)

- Born: Mario Anthony Casilli; January 22, 1931; Cleveland, Ohio, U.S.
- Died: April 25, 2002 (aged 71); Altadena, California, U.S.
- Education: Cleveland Institute of Art
- Occupations: Celebrity photographer, nudes
- Years active: 1957–2002
- Spouse: Gwen Casilli
- Children: 3

Mario Anthony Casilli (January 22, 1931 – April 25, 2002) was an American photographer. Among other assignments, he worked for Playboy magazine between 1957 and 1996 and his first photoshoot there was of Jacquelyn Prescott, as Playmate of the Month of September 1957.

== Biography ==
Casilli attended the Cleveland Institute of Art at only 14 years of age. He later served in the United States Navy before moving to Hollywood, where he worked at Paul Hesse Studios. This is the place where he learned the business of photography. After four years of working at Paul Hesse Studios, Casilli decided to open up his own studio and begin his career as a professional photographer. He had the opportunity to photograph big celebrities such as Donna Summer, Dolly Parton, Sally Field, Will Smith, and Halle Berry. Casilli's style is said to have been iconic and defined the photography of the 1980s.

From 1962 until 1981 he photographed fifty-seven Playmate pictorials, including Playmates of the Year Linda Gamble, Christa Speck, Jo Collins, Connie Kreski, Claudia Jennings and Dorothy Stratten. He also photographed several covers for Playboy, as well as celebrities such as Alexandra Hay, Valerie Perrine, Victoria Principal, Joan Collins and Mariel Hemingway. In addition to his work with Playboy, Casilli also contributed stills to the films Star 80 (1983) (which was about murdered Playmate Dorothy Stratten) and Nuts (1987). Casilli did a special promotional shoot of Carrie Fisher in her iconic bikini from Return of the Jedi (1983).

Casilli also photographed many album covers, including The Judds 1985 album Rockin' with the Rhythm.

In his later years, Casilli taught at the Art Center College of Design in Pasadena. He also continued to take photographs and to maintain his studio in Southern California.

Casilli died in Altadena, California, at the age of 71.
