= List of Playboy Playmates of the Year =

This is a list of models who were chosen as a Playboy Playmate of the Year for the American edition of Playboy magazine.

== List of Playmates of the Year ==
- 1953: Marilyn Monroe
- 1954:
- 1955:
- 1956:
- 1957: Lisa Winters
- 1958:
- 1959:
- 1960: Ellen Stratton
- 1961: Linda Gamble
- 1962: Christa Speck
- 1963: June Cochran
- 1964: Donna Michelle
- 1965: Jo Collins
- 1966: Allison Parks
- 1967: Lisa Baker
- 1968: Angela Dorian
- 1969: Connie Kreski
- 1970: Claudia Jennings
- 1971: Sharon Clark
- 1972: Liv Lindeland
- 1973: Marilyn Cole
- 1974: Cyndi Wood
- 1975: Marilyn Lange
- 1976: Lillian Müller
- 1977: Patti McGuire
- 1978: Debra Jo Fondren
- 1979: Monique St. Pierre
- 1980: Dorothy Stratten
- 1981: Terri Welles
- 1982: Shannon Tweed
- 1983: Marianne Gravatte
- 1984: Barbara Edwards
- 1985: Karen Velez
- 1986: Kathy Shower
- 1987: Donna Edmondson
- 1988: India Allen
- 1989: Kimberley Conrad
- 1990: Reneé Tenison
- 1991: Lisa Matthews
- 1992: Corinna Harney
- 1993: Anna Nicole Smith
- 1994: Jenny McCarthy
- 1995: Julie Lynn Cialini
- 1996: Stacy Sanches
- 1997: Victoria Silvstedt
- 1998: Karen McDougal
- 1999: Heather Kozar
- 2000: Jodi Ann Paterson
- 2001: Brande Roderick
- 2002: Dalene Kurtis
- 2003: Christina Santiago
- 2004: Carmella DeCesare
- 2005: Tiffany Fallon
- 2006: Kara Monaco
- 2007: Sara Jean Underwood
- 2008: Jayde Nicole
- 2009: Ida Ljungqvist
- 2010: Hope Dworaczyk
- 2011: Claire Sinclair
- 2012: Jaclyn Swedberg
- 2013: Raquel Pomplun
- 2014: Kennedy Summers
- 2015: Dani Mathers
- 2016: Eugena Washington
- 2017: Brook Power
- 2018: Nina Daniele
- 2019: Jordan Emanuel
- 2020: All 12 (Vendela, Megan Moore, Miki Hamano, Fo Porter, Abigail O'Neill, Yoli Lara, Teela LaRoux, Geena Rocero, Sophie O'Neil, Hilda Dias Pimentel, Gillian Chan, Jordy Murray)
- 2025: Gillian Nation

== Playmates of the Year by original month of appearance ==
=== January ===
- Connie Kreski (1968)
- Liv Lindeland (1971)
- Marilyn Cole (1972)
- Kimberley Conrad (1988)
- Heather Kozar (1998)
- Jayde Nicole (2007)
- Vendela (2019)

=== February ===
- Cyndi Wood (1973)
- Julie Lyn Cialini (1994)
- Megan Moore (2019)

=== March ===
- Stacy Sanches (1995)
- Ida Ljungqvist (2008)
- Miki Hamano (2019)

=== April ===
- Linda Gamble (1960)
- Lisa Matthews (1990)
- Brande Roderick (2000)
- Carmella DeCesare (2003)
- Hope Dworaczyk (2009)
- Jaclyn Swedberg (2011)
- Raquel Pomplun (2012)
- Nina Daniele (2017)
- Fo Porter (2019)

=== May ===
- Marilyn Lange (1974)
- Kathy Shower (1985)
- Anna Nicole Smith (1992)
- Dani Mathers (2014)
- Brook Power (2016)
- Abigail O'Neill (2019)

=== June ===
- Kara Monaco (2005)
- Yoli Lara (2019)

=== July ===
- Sara Jean Underwood (2006)
- Teela LaRoux (2019)

=== August ===
- Sharon Clark (1970)
- Lillian Müller (1975)
- Dorothy Stratten (1979)
- Corinna Harney (1991)
- Christina Santiago (2002)
- Geena Rocero (2019)

=== September ===
- Christa Speck (1961)
- Angela Dorian (1967)
- Debra Jo Fondren (1977)
- Barbara Edwards (1983)
- Dalene Kurtis (2001)
- Sophie O'Neil (2019)

=== October ===
- Allison Parks (1965)
- Marianne Gravatte (1982)
- Jenny McCarthy (1993)
- Jodi Ann Paterson (1999)
- Claire Sinclair (2010)
- Hilda Dias Pimentel (2019)

=== November ===
- Lisa Baker (1966)
- Claudia Jennings (1969)
- Patti McGuire (1977)
- Monique St. Pierre (1978)
- Shannon Tweed (1981)
- Donna Edmondson (1986)
- Renee Tenison (1989)
- Gillian Chan (2019)

=== December ===
- Ellen Stratton (1959)
- June Cochran (1962)
- Donna Michelle (1963)
- Jo Collins (1964)
- Terri Welles (1980)
- Karen Velez (1984)
- India Allen (1987)
- Victoria Silvstedt (1996)
- Karen McDougal (1997)
- Tiffany Fallon (2004)
- Kennedy Summers (2013)
- Eugena Washington (2015)
- Jordan Emanuel (2018)
- Jordy Murray (2019)

== See also ==
- List of Playboy Playmates of the Month
- Playboy Playmate
