= Pompeo Posar =

Photographer

Pompeo Posar (Italian pronunciation: [pomˈpeːo]; February 21, 1921 – April 5, 2004) was a Playboy magazine staff photographer who photographed many centerfold features and accompanying pictures of women featured as playmate of the month. Notably, he was responsible for the December 1968 centerfold of Cynthia Myers and the November 1975 centerfold of Janet Lupo.

He was born in Trieste, Italy. He spent his career working out of an office in Chicago, Illinois, US.

== Books and magazines ==
- Playboy: Portfolio: Pompeo Posar (Dec 1976)
- Playboy Magazine: Playmates Forever! part two (Apr 1984)
- Playboy Special Edition: Playboy's Pompeo Posar a portfolio of beautiful women (1985)
