= Centerfold =

Portrait of a model in the middle of a magazine

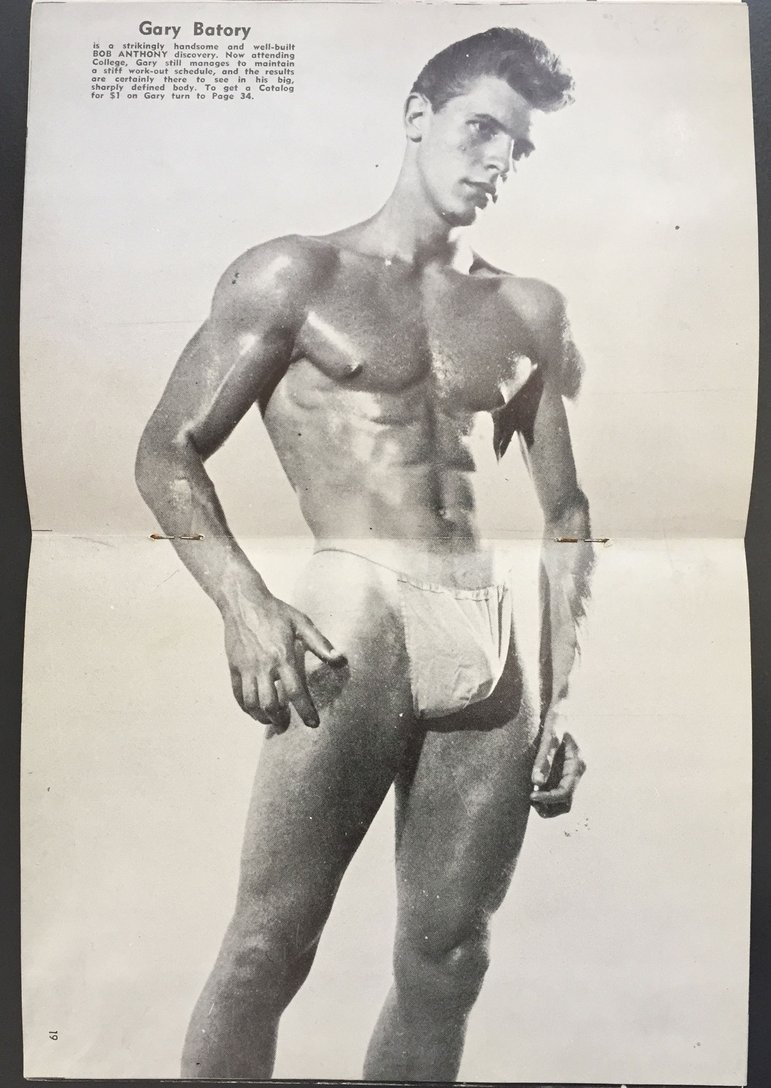
A centerfold spread from a 1962 issue of the physique magazine Champ, showing a male model in a posing strap. In this example, the reader would be required to rotate the magazine to view the photo properly.

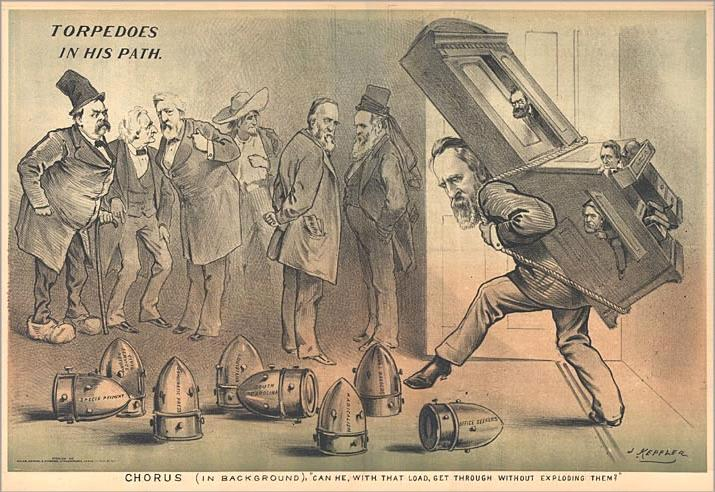
"Torpedoes in His Path: Can he, with that load, get through without exploding them?" U.S. President Rutherford B. Hayes carries a cabinet on his back, containing Vice President William Wheeler, Secretary of the Treasury John Sherman, and Secretary of the Interior Carl Schurz. In the background are James G. Blaine, John Logan, Abram Hewitt and others. Published in Puck Magazine: Centerfold; Vol. 1 No. 1, March 14, 1877

The centerfold or centrefold of a magazine is the inner pages of the middle sheet, usually containing a portrait, such as a pin-up or a nude. The term can also refer to the model featured in the portrait. In saddle-stitched magazines (as opposed to those that are perfect-bound), the centerfold does not have any blank space cutting through the image.

The term was coined by Hugh Hefner, founder of Playboy magazine. The success of the 1953 first issue of Playboy has been attributed in large part to its centerfold: a nude of Marilyn Monroe. The advent of monthly centerfolds gave the pin-up a new respectability and helped to sanitize the notion of "sexiness". Being featured as a centerfold could lead to film roles for models, and still occasionally does today.

Early on, Hefner required Playboy centerfolds to be portrayed precisely, telling photographers in a 1956 memo that the "model must be in a natural setting engaged in some activity 'like reading, writing, mixing a drink'...[and]... should have a 'healthy, intelligent, American look—a young lady that looks like she might be a very efficient secretary or an undergrad at Vassar.'" Hefner later said that the ideal centerfold is one in which "a situation is suggested, the presence of someone not in the picture"; the goal was to transform "a straight pinup into an intimate interlude, something personal and special."

Some magazines later adopted the practice of having a centerfold with three or even four-folds, using a longer sheet of paper at that spot and folding the extra length into the magazine. Racier adult magazines used this space to showcase more explicit imagery: "In order to represent breasts, genitals, anus, and face all within the tri-fold frame of the centerfold, models were propped up, legs spread, raised, and then jack-knifed against their bodies, arms plunged between them to spread the labia."

Though the term has become linked in the public consciousness with erotic material or models, many other magazines such as Life, Time and National Geographic have published fold-out spreads on other subjects.

== Titles ==
Some magazines will refer to their centerfold models with a specific name, which may be connected to the magazine's brand or theme.
When obtained from one of the more prestigious publications in the field, it can become a semi-formal personal title used in news articles and introductions long after the model's centerfold appearance.

Publication	Centerfold
Blueboy	Man of the Month/Year
Cheri	Tart of the Month/Supertart
Duke	Duchess
Gallery	Girl Next Door
Genesis	Playgirls (double centerfold, discontinued)
High Society	Society's Child (abandoned name)
Hustler	Honey
Knave	Maid of the Month
Lui	La Fille du Mois
Mandate	The Mandate Man (abandoned name)
Mayfair	Girl of the Month
Men Only	Men Only Girl/Miss (abandoned name)
Penthouse	Pet
Playboy	Playmate
Playgirl	Man of the Month/Year
Playmen	La Ragazza del Mese

Some online-only media outlets maintain a monthly designation reminiscent of a print magazine centerfold; for example, the Twistys Treat.

== Center spread ==
As a layout device, a centerfold is closely related to a center spread, a pictorial spanning the two center pages of a magazine or other publication, taking advantage of the fact that these are printed on a single sheet of paper.
