= List of Playboy Playmates of 1957 =

The following is a list of Playboy Playmates of 1957. Playboy magazine named its Playmate of the Month each month throughout the year.

== January ==
June Blair

Personal details
- Born: Margaret June Blair; October 20, 1932 San Francisco, California, U.S.
- Died: December 4, 2022 (aged 90) Sherman Oaks, California, U.S.
- Height: 5 ft 5 in (165 cm)

June Blair (born Margaret June Blair; October 20, 1932 – December 4, 2022) was an American model and actress. She is best known for being Playboy magazine's Playmate of the Month for its January 1957 issue. Her centerfold was photographed by Hal Adams. She died in Sherman Oaks, California, on December 4, 2022, at the age of 90.

== February ==
Sally Todd
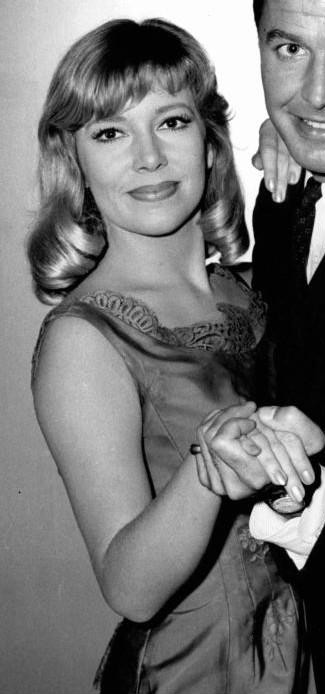
- Todd with Dean Miller on The Tab Hunter Show, 1961

Personal details
- Born: Sarah Joan Todd; June 7, 1934 Boone, Missouri, U.S.
- Died: November 21, 2022 (aged 88) France

Sally Todd (born Sarah Joan Todd; June 7, 1934 – November 21, 2022) was an American actress and model. She was Playboy magazine's Playmate of the Month for the February 1957 issue. Her centerfold was photographed by David Sutton and Ed DeLong.

== March ==
Sandra Edwards
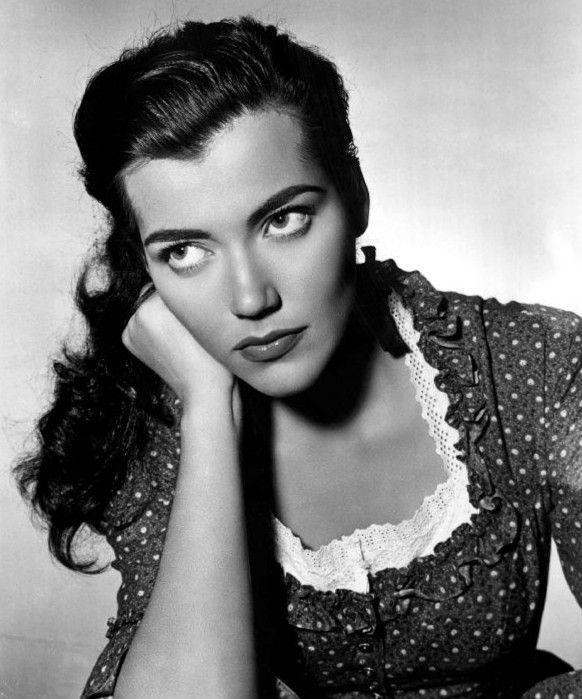
- Edwards in 1958

Personal details
- Born: March 12, 1938 Los Angeles, California, U.S.
- Died: June 2, 2017 (aged 79) Palm Springs, California, U.S.
- Height: 5 ft 7 in (170 cm)

Sandra Edwards (March 12, 1938 – June 2, 2017) was an American actress and model. She was Playboy magazine's Playmate of the Month for the March 1957 issue. Her centerfold was photographed by Peter Gowland. Her name is usually spelled Saundra Edwards.

== April ==
Gloria Windsor

Personal details
- Born: July 9, 1936 (age 89)

Gloria Windsor (born July 9, 1936) is an American model. She was Playboy magazine's Playmate of the Month for the April 1957 issue. Her centerfold was photographed by Hal Adams.

== May ==
Dawn Richard

Personal details
- Born: Margaret Dawn Richard; March 5, 1936 (age 90) Los Angeles, California, U.S.
- Height: 5 ft 5 in (165 cm)

Margaret Dawn Richard (born March 5, 1936) is an American model and actress. She was Playboy magazine's Playmate of the Month for the May 1957 issue. She's of Osage Indian descent. Her father was a former silent movie stunt pilot. Dawn's family moved to Palm Springs, California, where her father built five motels. Richard acted in a high school stage production of "Meet Me in St. Louis".

She made her film debut in an uncredited bit part as a Pharaoh's daughter in the big budget biblical epic, “The Ten Commandments” (1956). Dawn had an especially memorable role as ill-fated gymnast "Theresa" in the drive-in adolescent horror cult classic, “I Was a Teenage Werewolf“ (1957). Among the TV shows she made guest appearances on episodes of Father Knows Best (1954), Perry Mason (1957), Colt .45 (1957), and Dragnet (1951).

Richard was the Playmate of the Month in the May, 1957 issue of "Playboy". Her centerfold was photographed by Ed DeLong and David Sutton. Moreover, Dawn also posed for such adult publications as "Bachelor", "Modern Man", "Man's Magazine," and "Vue". Her poses for these magazines avoided explicit nudity.

Richard married multiple Oscar nominated producer David L. Wolper in 1958 and had three children with him prior to divorcing Wolper in 1969.

Richard married Spyro Joannides in 1970 and had one child.

== June ==
Carrie Radison

Personal details
- Born: November 1, 1938 (age 87) Philadelphia, Pennsylvania, U.S.
- Height: 5 ft 5 in (165 cm)

Carrie Radison (born November 1, 1938) is an American model and actress. She was Playboy magazine's Playmate of the Month for the June 1957 issue. Her centerfold was photographed by Desmond Russell.

== July ==
Jean Jani

Personal details
- Born: October 31, 1931 Dayton, Ohio, U.S.
- Died: October 26, 2021 (aged 89) Torrance, California, U.S.
- Height: 5 ft 3 in (160 cm)

Norma Jean Jani (October 31, 1931 – October 26, 2021) was an American model. She was Playboy magazine's Playmate of the Month for the July 1957 issue. Her centerfold was photographed by Peter Gowland.

== August ==
Dolores Donlon

Personal details
- Born: Patricia Vaniver; September 19, 1920 Philadelphia, Pennsylvania, U.S.
- Died: November 30, 2012 (aged 92) Philadelphia, Pennsylvania, U.S.
- Height: 5 ft 7 in (170 cm)

Dolores Donlon (born Patricia Vaniver; September 19, 1920 – November 30, 2012) was an American model and actress. She was Playboy magazine's Playmate of the Month for the August 1957 issue.

Her centerfold was photographed by Peter Gowland.

== September ==
Jacquelyn Prescott

Personal details
- Born: September 30, 1936 (age 89) Redlands, California, U.S.

Jacquelyn Prescott (born September 30 1936) is an American model. She was Playboy magazine's Playmate of the Month for the September 1957 issue. Her centerfold was photographed by Mario Casili, the first Playmate of his long career with Playboy.

== October ==
Colleen Farrington

Personal details
- Born: August 5, 1936 New Mexico, U.S.
- Died: October 12, 2015 (aged 79) Jupiter, Florida, U.S.
- Height: 5 ft 8 in (173 cm)

Colleen Farrington (August 5, 1936 – October 12, 2015) was an American model and nightclub singer. She was Playboy magazine's Playmate of the Month for the October 1957 issue. Her centerfold was photographed by Peter Basch.

Farrington died in Jupiter, Florida, at the age of 79. She was the mother of Academy Award-nominated actress Diane Lane.

== November ==
Marlene Callahan

Personal details
- Born: August 24, 1937 (age 88) Ventura, California, U.S.
- Height: 5 ft 2 in (157 cm)

Marlene Callahan (born August 24, 1937) is an American model, actress and, as Marlene Callahan Wallace, photographer. She was Playboy magazine's Playmate of the Month for the November 1957 issue. Her centerfold was photographed by Vivienne Lapham.

== December ==
Linda Vargas

Personal details
- Born: April 20, 1939
- Died: May 26, 1973 (aged 34)

Linda Vargas (April 20, 1939 – May 26, 1973) was an American model. She was Playboy magazine's Playmate of the Month for the December 1957 issue. Her centerfold was photographed by Herbert Melford and Mike Shea.

Vargas, who began modeling when she was a teenager, had a steady career before and after her Playmate appearance as a model and bit actress. Frequent Playboy photographer Peter Gowland used images of her in many of his instruction books.

She died on May 26, 1973, at the age of 34.

== See also ==
- List of people in Playboy 1953–1959

June Blair	Sally Todd	Saundra Edwards	Gloria Windsor	Dawn Richard	Carrie Radison
Jean Jani	Dolores Donlon	Jacquelyn Prescott	Colleen Farrington	Marlene Callahan	Linda Vargas
