= List of Playboy Playmates of the Month =

The following women have shown up in the American or international edition of Playboy magazine as Playmate of the Month. Those who were also named Playmate of the Year are highlighted in green.

A common misconception is that Marilyn Monroe was a Playmate of the Month. She appeared in the first issue of Playboy as the "Sweetheart of the Month". The term "Playmate" was introduced in the second issue, but that term was applied to Monroe in several later issues.

== 1954–1959 ==
| | January | February | March | April | May | June | July | August | September | October | November | December |
|---|---|---|---|---|---|---|---|---|---|---|---|---|
| 1954 | Margie Harrison | Margaret Scott (a.k.a. Marilyn Waltz) | Dolores Del Monte | Marilyn Waltz | Joanne Arnold | Margie Harrison | Neva Gilbert | Arline Hunter | Jackie Rainbow | Madeline Castle | Diane Hunter | Terry Ryan |
| 1955 | Bettie Page | Jayne Mansfield | magazine was not published | Marilyn Waltz | Marguerite Empey | Eve Meyer | Janet Pilgrim | Pat Lawler | Anne Fleming | Jean Moorehead | Barbara Cameron | Janet Pilgrim |
| 1956 | Lynn Turner | Marguerite Empey | Marian Stafford | Rusty Fisher | Marion Scott | Gloria Walker | Alice Denham | Jonnie Nicely | Elsa Sorensen | Janet Pilgrim | Betty Blue | Lisa Winters |
| 1957 | June Blair | Sally Todd | Sandra Edwards | Gloria Windsor | Dawn Richard | Carrie Radison | Jean Jani | Dolores Donlon | Jacquelyn Prescott | Colleen Farrington | Marlene Callahan | Linda Vargas |
| 1958 | Elizabeth Ann Roberts | Cheryl Kubert | Zahra Norbo | Felicia Atkins | Lari Laine | Judy Lee Tomerlin | Linné Ahlstrand | Myrna Weber | Teri Hope | Mara Corday and Pat Sheehan | Joan Staley | Joyce Nizzari |
| 1959 | Virginia Gordon | Eleanor Bradley | Audrey Daston | Nancy Crawford | Cindy Fuller | Marilyn Hanold | Yvette Vickers | Clayre Peters | Marianne Gaba | Elaine Reynolds | Donna Lynn | Ellen Stratton |

Note: Ellen Stratton was the first official Playmate of the Year.

== 1960–1969 ==
| | January | February | March | April | May | June | July | August | September | October | November | December |
|---|---|---|---|---|---|---|---|---|---|---|---|---|
| 1960 | Stella Stevens | Susie Scott | Sally Sarell | Linda Gamble | Ginger Young | Delores Wells | Teddi Smith | Elaine Paul | Ann Davis | Kathy Douglas | Joni Mattis | Carol Eden |
| 1961 | Connie Cooper | Barbara Ann Lawford | Tonya Crews | Nancy Nielsen | Susan Kelly | Heidi Becker | Sheralee Conners | Karen Thompson | Christa Speck | Jean Cannon | Dianne Danford | Lynn Karrol |
| 1962 | Merle Pertile | Kari Knudsen | Pamela Anne Gordon | Roberta Lane | Marya Carter | Merissa Mathes | Unne Terjesen | Jan Roberts | Mickey Winters | Laura Young | Avis Kimble | June Cochran |
| 1963 | Judi Monterey | Toni Ann Thomas | Adrienne Moreau | Sandra Settani | Sharon Cintron | Connie Mason | Carrie Enwright | Phyllis Sherwood | Victoria Valentino | Christine Williams | Terre Tucker | Donna Michelle |
| 1964 | Sharon Rogers | Nancy Jo Hooper | Nancy Scott | Ashlyn Martin | Terri Kimball | Lori Winston | Melba Ogle | China Lee | Astrid Schulz | Rosemarie Hillcrest | Kai Brendlinger | Jo Collins |
| 1965 | Sally Duberson | Jessica St. George | Jennifer Jackson | Sue Williams | Maria McBane | Hedy Scott | Gay Collier | Lannie Balcom | Patti Reynolds | Allison Parks | Pat Russo | Dinah Willis |
| 1966 | Judy Tyler | Melinda Windsor | Priscilla Wright | Karla Conway | Dolly Read | Kelly Burke | Tish Howard | Susan Denberg | Dianne Chandler | Linda Moon | Lisa Baker | Susan Bernard |
| 1967 | Surrey Marshe | Kim Farber | Fran Gerard | Gwen Wong | Anne Randall | Joey Gibson | Heather Ryan | DeDe Lind | Angela Dorian (a.k.a. Victoria Vetri) | Reagan Wilson | Kaya Christian | Lynn Winchell |
| 1968 | Connie Kreski | Nancy Harwood | Michelle Hamilton | Gaye Rennie | Elizabeth Jordan | Britt Fredriksen | Melodye Prentiss | Gale Olson | Dru Hart | Majken Haugedal | Paige Young | Cynthia Myers |
| 1969 | Leslie Bianchini | Lorrie Menconi | Kathy MacDonald | Lorna Hopper | Sally Sheffield | Helena Antonaccio | Nancy McNeil | Debbie Hooper | Shay Knuth | Jean Bell | Claudia Jennings | Gloria Root |

== 1970–1979 ==
| | January | February | March | April | May | June | July | August | September | October | November | December |
|---|---|---|---|---|---|---|---|---|---|---|---|---|
| 1970 | Jill Taylor | Linda Forsythe | Chris Koren | Barbara Hillary | Jennifer Liano | Elaine Morton | Carol Willis | Sharon Clark | Debbie Ellison | Madeleine Collinson & Mary Collinson | Avis Miller | Carol Imhof |
| 1971 | Liv Lindeland | Willy Rey | Cynthia Hall | Chris Cranston | Janice Pennington | Lieko English | Heather Van Every | Cathy Rowland | Crystal Smith | Claire Rambeau | Danielle de Vabre | Karen Christy |
| 1972 | Marilyn Cole | P. J. Lansing | Ellen Michaels | Vicki Peters | Deanna Baker | Debbie Davis | Carol O'Neal | Linda Summers | Susan Miller | Sharon Johansen | Lenna Sjooblom | Mercy Rooney |
| 1973 | Miki Garcia | Cyndi Wood | Bonnie Large | Julie Woodson | Anulka Dziubinska | Ruthy Ross | Martha Smith | Phyllis Coleman | Geri Glass | Valerie Lane | Monica Tidwell | Christine Maddox |
| 1974 | Nancy Cameron | Francine Parks | Pamela Zinszer | Marlene Morrow | Marilyn Lange | Sandy Johnson | Carol Vitale | Jeane Manson | Kristine Hanson | Ester Cordet | Bebe Buell | Janice Raymond |
| 1975 | Lynnda Kimball | Laura Misch | Ingeborg Sorensen | Victoria Cunningham | Bridgett Rollins | Azizi Johari | Lynn Schiller | Lillian Müller | Mesina Miller | Jill De Vries | Janet Lupo | Nancie Li Brandi |
| 1976 | Daina House | Laura Lyons | Ann Pennington | Denise Michele | Patricia Margot McClain | Debra Peterson | Deborah Borkman | Linda Beatty | Whitney Kaine | Hope Olson | Patti McGuire | Karen Hafter |
| 1977 | Susan Lynn Kiger | Star Stowe | Nicki Thomas | Lisa Sohm | Sheila Mullen | Virve Reid | Sondra Theodore | Julia Lyndon | Debra Jo Fondren | Kristine Winder | Rita Lee | Ashley Cox |
| 1978 | Debra Jensen | Janis Schmitt | Christina Smith | Pamela Jean Bryant | Kathryn Morrison | Gail Stanton | Karen Morton | Vicki Witt | Rosanne Katon | Marcy Hanson | Monique St. Pierre | Janet Quist |
| 1979 | Candy Loving | Lee Ann Michelle | Denise McConnell | Missy Cleveland | Michele Drake | Louann Fernald | Dorothy Mays | Dorothy Stratten | Vicki McCarty | Ursula Buchfellner | Sylvie Garant | Candace Collins |

== 1980–1989 ==
| | January | February | March | April | May | June | July | August | September | October | November | December |
|---|---|---|---|---|---|---|---|---|---|---|---|---|
| 1980 | Gig Gangel | Sandy Cagle | Henriette Allais | Liz Glazowski | Martha Thomsen | Ola Ray | Teri Peterson | Victoria Cooke | Lisa Welch | Mardi Jacquet | Jeana Tomasino | Terri Welles |
| 1981 | Karen Price | Vicki Lynn Lasseter | Kymberly Herrin | Lorraine Michaels | Gina Goldberg | Cathy Larmouth | Heidi Sorenson | Debbie Boostrom | Susan Smith | Kelly Tough | Shannon Tweed | Patricia Farinelli |
| 1982 | Kimberly McArthur | Anne-Marie Fox | Karen Witter | Linda Rhys Vaughn | Kym Malin | Lourdes Estores | Lynda Wiesmeier | Cathy St. George | Connie Brighton | Marianne Gravatte | Marlene Janssen | Charlotte Kemp |
| 1983 | Lonny Chin | Melinda Mays | Alana Soares | Christina Ferguson | Susie Scott Krabacher | Jolanda Egger | Ruth Guerri | Carina Persson | Barbara Edwards | Tracy Vaccaro | Veronica Gamba | Terry Nihen |
| 1984 | Penny Baker | Justine Greiner | Dona Speir | Lesa Ann Pedriana | Patty Duffek | Tricia Lange | Liz Stewart | Suzi Schott | Kimberly Evenson | Debi Johnson | Roberta Vasquez | Karen Velez |
| 1985 | Joan Bennett | Cherie Witter | Donna Smith | Cindy Brooks | Kathy Shower | Devin DeVasquez | Hope Marie Carlton | Cher Butler | Venice Kong | Cynthia Brimhall | Pamela Saunders | Carol Ficatier |
| 1986 | Sherry Arnett | Julie McCullough | Kim Morris | Teri Weigel | Christine Richters | Rebecca Ferratti | Lynne Austin | Ava Fabian | Rebekka Armstrong | Katherine Hushaw | Donna Edmondson | Laurie Carr |
| 1987 | Luann Lee | Julie Peterson | Marina Baker | Anna Clark | Kymberly Paige | Sandy Greenberg | Carmen Berg | Sharry Konopski | Gwen Hajek | Brandi Brandt | Pamela Stein | India Allen |
| 1988 | Kimberley Conrad | Kari Kennell | Susie Owens | Eloise Broady | Diana Lee | Emily Arth | Terri Lynn Doss | Helle Michaelsen | Laura Richmond | Shannon Long | Pia Reyes | Kata Kärkkäinen |
| 1989 | Fawna MacLaren | Simone Eden | Laurie Wood | Jennifer Jackson | Monique Noel | Tawnni Cable | Erika Eleniak | Gianna Amore | Karin van Breeschooten & Mirjam van Breeschooten | Karen Foster | Renee Tenison | Petra Verkaik |

== 1990–1999 ==
| | January | February | March | April | May | June | July | August | September | October | November | December |
|---|---|---|---|---|---|---|---|---|---|---|---|---|
| 1990 | Peggy McIntaggart | Pamela Anderson | Deborah Driggs | Lisa Matthews | Tina Bockrath | Bonnie Marino | Jacqueline Sheen | Melissa Evridge | Kerri Kendall | Brittany York | Lorraine Olivia | Morgan Fox |
| 1991 | Stacy Leigh Arthur | Cristy Thom | Julie Clarke | Christina Leardini | Carrie Jean Yazel | Saskia Linssen | Wendy Kaye | Corinna Harney | Samantha Dorman | Cheryl Bachman | Tonja Christensen | Wendy Hamilton |
| 1992 | Suzi Simpson | Tanya Beyer | Tylyn John | Cady Cantrell | Anna Nicole Smith | Angela Melini | Amanda Hope | Ashley Allen | Morena Corwin | Tiffany Sloan | Stephanie Adams | Barbara Moore |
| 1993 | Echo Johnson | Jennifer LeRoy | Kimberly Donley | Nicole Wood | Elke Jeinsen | Alesha Oreskovich | Leisa Sheridan | Jennifer Lavoie | Carrie Westcott | Jenny McCarthy | Julianna Young | Arlene Baxter |
| 1994 | Anna-Marie Goddard | Julie Lynn Cialini | Neriah Davis | Becky DelosSantos | Shae Marks | Elan Carter | Traci Adell | Maria Checa | Kelly Gallagher | Victoria Zdrok | Donna Perry | Elisa Bridges |
| 1995 | Melissa Holliday | Lisa Marie Scott | Stacy Sanches | Danelle Folta | Cynthia Brown | Rhonda Adams | Heidi Mark | Rachel Jean Marteen | Donna D'Errico | Alicia Rickter | Holly Witt | Samantha Torres |
| 1996 | Victoria Fuller | Kona Carmack | Priscilla Taylor | Gillian Bonner | Shauna Sand | Karin Taylor | Angel Boris | Jessica Lee | Jennifer Allan | Nadine Chanz | Ulrika Ericsson | Victoria Silvstedt |
| 1997 | Jami Ferrell | Kimber West | Jennifer Miriam | Kelly Monaco | Lynn Thomas | Carrie Stevens | Daphnée Lynn Duplaix | Kalin Olson | Nikki Schieler | Layla Roberts | Inga Drozdova | Karen McDougal |
| 1998 | Heather Kozar | Julia Schultz | Marliece Andrada | Holly Joan Hart | Deanna Brooks | Maria Luisa Gil | Lisa Dergan | Angela Little | Vanessa Gleason | Laura Cover | Tiffany Taylor | Nicole, Erica and Jaclyn Dahm |
| 1999 | Jaime Bergman | Stacy Marie Fuson | Alexandria Karlsen | Natalia Sokolova | Tishara Cousino | Kimberly Spicer | Jennifer Rovero | Rebecca Scott | Kristi Cline | Jodi Ann Paterson | Cara Wakelin | Brooke Richards |

== 2000–2009 ==
| | January | February | March | April | May | June | July | August | September | October | November | December |
|---|---|---|---|---|---|---|---|---|---|---|---|---|
| 2000 | Carol Bernaola & Darlene Bernaola | Suzanne Stokes | Nicole Marie Lenz | Brande Roderick | Brooke Berry | Shannon Stewart | Neferteri Shepherd | Summer Altice | Kerissa Fare | Nichole Van Croft | Buffy Tyler | Cara Michelle |
| 2001 | Irina Voronina | Lauren Michelle Hill | Miriam Gonzalez | Katie Lohmann | Crista Nicole | Heather Spytek | Kimberley Stanfield | Jennifer Walcott | Dalene Kurtis | Stephanie Heinrich | Lindsey Vuolo | Shanna Moakler |
| 2002 | Nicole Narain | Anka Romensky | Tina Jordan | Heather Carolin | Christi Shake | Michele Rogers | Lauren Anderson | Christina Santiago | Shallan Meiers | Teri Harrison | Serria Tawan | Lani Todd |
| 2003 | Rebecca Ramos | Charis Boyle | Pennelope Jimenez | Carmella DeCesare | Laurie Fetter | Tailor James | Marketa Janska | Colleen Marie | Luci Victoria | Audra Lynn | Divini Rae | Deisy Teles & Sarah Teles |
| 2004 | Colleen Shannon | Aliya Wolf | Sandra Hubby | Krista Kelly | Nicole Whitehead | Hiromi Oshima | Stephanie Glasson | Pilar Lastra | Scarlett Keegan | Kimberly Holland | Cara Zavaleta | Tiffany Fallon |
| 2005 | Destiny Davis | Amber Campisi | Jillian Grace | Courtney Rachel Culkin | Jamie Westenhiser | Kara Monaco | Qiana Chase | Tamara Witmer | Vanessa Hoelsher | Amanda Paige | Raquel Gibson | Christine Smith |
| 2006 | Athena Lundberg | Cassandra Lynn | Monica Leigh | Holley Ann Dorrough | Alison Waite | Stephanie Larimore | Sara Jean Underwood | Nicole Voss | Janine Habeck | Jordan Monroe | Sarah Elizabeth | Kia Drayton |
| 2007 | Jayde Nicole | Heather Rene Smith | Tyran Richard | Giuliana Marino | Shannon James | Brittany Binger | Tiffany Selby | Tamara Sky | Patrice Hollis | Spencer Scott | Lindsay Wagner | Sasckya Porto |
| 2008 | Sandra Nilsson | Michelle McLaughlin | Ida Ljungqvist | Regina Deutinger | AJ Alexander | Juliette Fretté | Laura Croft | Kayla Collins | Valerie Mason | Kelly Carrington | Grace Kim | Jennifer and Natalie Jo Campbell |
| 2009 | Dasha Astafieva | Jessica Burciaga | Jennifer Pershing | Hope Dworaczyk | Crystal McCahill | Candice Cassidy | Karissa Shannon | Kristina Shannon | Kimberly Phillips | Lindsey Evans | Kelley Thompson | Crystal Harris |

== 2010–2019 ==
| | January | February | March | April | May | June | July | August | September | October | November | December |
|---|---|---|---|---|---|---|---|---|---|---|---|---|
| 2010 | Jaime Faith Edmondson | Heather Rae El Moussa | Kyra Milan | Amy Leigh Andrews | Kassie Lyn Logsdon | Katie Vernola | Shanna McLaughlin | Francesca Frigo | Olivia Paige | Claire Sinclair | Shera Bechard | Ashley Hobbs |
| 2011 | Anna Sophia Berglund | Kylie Johnson | Ashley Mattingly | Jaclyn Swedberg | Sasha Bonilova | Mei-Ling Lam | Jessa Lynn Hinton | Iryna Ivanova | Tiffany Toth | Amanda Cerny | Ciara Price | Rainy Day Jordan |
| 2012 | Heather Knox | Leola Bell | Lisa Seiffert | Raquel Pomplun | Nikki Leigh | Amelia Talon | Shelby Chesnes | Beth Williams | Alana Campos | Pamela Horton | Britany Nola | Amanda Streich |
| 2013 | Karina Marie | Shawn Dillon | Ashley Doris | Jaslyn Ome | Kristen Nicole | Audrey Aleen Allen | Alyssa Arcè | Val Keil | Bryiana Noelle | Carly Lauren | Gemma Lee Farrell | Kennedy Summers |
| 2014 | Roos van Montfort | Amanda Booth | Britt Linn | Shanice Jordyn | Dani Mathers | Jessica Ashley | Emily Agnes | Maggie May | Stephanie Branton | Roxanna June | Gia Marie | Elizabeth Ostrander |
| 2015 | Brittny Ward | Kayslee Collins | Chelsie Aryn | Alexandra Tyler | Brittany Brousseau | Kaylia Cassandra | Kayla Rae Reid | Dominique Jane | Monica Sims | Ana Cheri | Rachel Harris | Eugena Washington |
| 2016 | Amberleigh West | Kristy Garett | Dree Hemingway | Camille Rowe | Brook Power | Josie Canseco | Ali Michael | Valerie van der Graaf | Kelly Gale | Allie Silva | Ashley Smith | Enikő Mihalik |
| 2017 | Bridget Malcolm | Joy Corrigan | Elizabeth Elam | Nina Daniele | Lada Kravchenko | Elsie Hewitt | Dana Taylor | Liza Kei | Jessica Wall | Milan Dixon | Ines Rau | Allie Leggett |
| 2018 | Kayla Garvin | Megan Samperi | Jenny Watwood | Nereyda Bird | Shauna Sexton | Cassandra Dawn | Valeria Lakhina | Lorena Medina | Kirby Griffin | Olga de Mar | Shelby Rose | Jordan Emanuel |
| 2019 | Vendela Lindblom | Megan Moore | Miki Hamano | Fo Porter | Abigail O'Neill | Yoli Lara | Teela LaRoux | Geena Rocero | Sophie O’Neil | Hilda Dias Pimentel | Gillian Chan | Jordy Murray |

Note: All 12 Playmates of the Month 2019 were named Playmate of the Year 2020.

== 2020–present ==
| | January | February | March | April | May | June | July | August | September | October | November | December |
|---|---|---|---|---|---|---|---|---|---|---|---|---|
| 2020 | Riley Ticotin | Chasity Samone | Anita Pathammavong | Marsha Elle | Savannah Smith | Alicia Olivas | Priscilla Huggins | Ali Chanel | Danielle Alcaraz | Carolina Ballesteros | Khrystyana | Tanerélle |

| | Winter | Spring | Summer | Fall |
|---|---|---|---|---|
| 2021 | Izabela Guedes | Hailee Lautenbach | – | – |

| | January | February | March | April | May | June | July | August | September | October | November | December |
|---|---|---|---|---|---|---|---|---|---|---|---|---|
| 2025 | Jordyn Johnson | Gayeanne Hazlewood | Emma Vanderhoof | Mahina Florence | Noémie Neuens | Kysre Gondrezick | Michelle Weisstuch | Mykeesha Nelson | Lexi Drew | Louisa Ama | Alexandria Finley | Hunny |

| | January | February | March | April | May | June | July | August | September | October | November | December |
|---|---|---|---|---|---|---|---|---|---|---|---|---|
| 2026 | Carlotta Kohl | Lauren Summer | Taylor Hale | Lexee Smith | Hanne Zaruma | Gabrielle Richardson | Sophie Saint | Lydia Bielen | Luna Piombanti | Vinetria | Holly Lim-Torres | – |

== See also ==
- List of Playboy models, including all models who have appeared in Playboy
- List of Playboy Playmates of the Year
