= List of Playboy Playmates of 1954 =

The following is a list of Playboy Playmates of 1954. Playboy magazine named its Playmate of the Month each month throughout the year. Prior to September 1959, Playmates were not asked to complete data sheets.

== January ==
Margie Harrison

Personal details
- Born: November 3, 1931 Los Angeles, California, U.S.
- Died: December 23, 2006 (aged 75)
- Height: 5 ft 4 in (163 cm)

Margie Harrison was an American actress and model. She was Playmate of the Month for both January 1954 and June 1954. While Marilyn Monroe preceded her as a Playboy "Sweetheart of the Month", Monroe did not appear in the center pages, but was pictured on pages 16 to 18. Harrison is therefore the first model designated "Playmate of the Month". Like Monroe, her photo was purchased from the John Baumgarth Company, which specialized in pin-up calendars. According to The Playmate Book, Harrison also appeared in the men's magazines Follies and Gala.

== February ==
Marilyn Waltz (a.k.a. Margaret Scott)

Personal details
- Born: Marilyn Ardith Waltz; November 5, 1931 Waukesha, Wisconsin, U.S.
- Died: December 23, 2006 (aged 75) Medford, U.S.
- Height: 5 ft 4 in (163 cm)

Marilyn Ardith Jordan (née Waltz; November 5, 1931 – December 23, 2006) was an American actress and model. Using the pseudonym Margaret Scott, she was Playboy magazine's Playmate of the Month for the February 1954 issue.

Known as Marilyn Waltz, (later Marilyn Jordan), she also appeared as Playmate of the Month in the April 1954 and April 1955 issues. She was the first of two women to become a three-time Playmate (the other being Janet Pilgrim). In her first Playboy appearance, Waltz was billed as Margaret Scott. For years thereafter, many assumed that Marilyn and Margaret were two different women. It was not until the mid-1990s that they were determined to be one and the same.

Waltz was born in Waukesha, Wisconsin in 1931. In 1954, she starred in the film Love Me Madly alongside Al Molinaro. Four years later, in 1958, she married Breck Jordan, who predeceased her. After retiring from acting and modeling, she worked in real estate in Southern California. In 1993, she moved to Oregon. She retired from real estate in 1996.

== March ==
Dolores Del Monte

Personal details
- Born: March 15, 1932 Spokane, Washington, U.S.
- Died: February 11, 2023 (aged 90)
- Height: 5 ft 6 in (168 cm)

Dolores Del Monte (March 15, 1932 – February 11, 2023) was Playboy magazine's Playmate of the Month for the March 1954 issue.

Del Monte was born in Spokane, Washington on March 15, 1932. Growing up, she wanted to be a model. She modeled as a pin-up, keeping the secret from her parents. In 1954, when she was nineteen, she participated in a calendar shoot. The shoot included swimsuit and nude photos. She was called and told her photo would be published, assuming it was a swimsuit photo. She was paid $50 for the shoot. It ended up being for Playboy. Just after the publishing, Del Monte got married later that year to Roy Card (they divorced and he died in 1985) and had children. She never knew her photos ended up in Playboy until her son saw a 25th-anniversary Playboy retrospective and called Del Monte to tell her he saw her in the magazine. Del Monte said she was embarrassed and proud at the same time when her son called with the news. In an interview with The New Yorker in 2014, Del Monte said models today "show too much" and that she would never model again.

After she left modeling, Del Monte worked in public relations. She died on February 11, 2023, at the age of 90.

== April ==
Marilyn Waltz (See February entry above)

== May ==
Joanne Arnold

Personal details
- Born: April 1, 1931 (age 95) Los Angeles, California, U.S.
- Height: 5 ft 4 in (163 cm)

Joanne Arnold (born April 1, 1931) is an American actress and model. She was Playboy magazine's Playmate of the Month for the May 1954 issue. She also appeared on the covers of the March 1954 and August 1955 issues.

== June ==
Margie Harrison (See January entry above)

== July ==
Neva Gilbert

Personal details
- Born: September 1, 1929 New York City, New York, U.S.
- Died: November 12, 2022 (aged 93) Lake Worth, Florida, U.S.
- Height: 5 ft 6 in (168 cm)

Neva Gilbert (September 1, 1929 – November 12, 2022) was an American model. She was Playboy magazine's Playmate of the Month for its July 1954 issue.

== August ==
Arline Hunter

Personal details
- Born: December 16, 1931 Caldwell, Idaho, U.S.
- Died: September 11, 2018 (aged 86) San Pedro, California, U.S.
- Height: 5 ft 6 in (168 cm)

Arline Hunter (December 16, 1931 – September 11, 2018) was an American actress and model who was perhaps best known as Playboy's Playmate of the Month for August 1954. Her centerfold was the first not to be purchased from the John Baumgarth Co. by Hugh Hefner, and was photographed by Ed DeLong.

== September ==
Jackie Rainbow

Personal details
- Born: June 6, 1933 Santa Monica, California, U.S.
- Died: June 15, 1988 (aged 55)
- Height: 5 ft 4 in (163 cm)

Jackie Rainbow (June 6, 1933 – June 15, 1988) was an American model. She was Playboy magazine's Playmate of the Month for its September 1954 issue. Her centerfold was photographed by Carlyle Blackwell for the Publix Pictorial Service.

== October ==
Madeline Castle

Personal details
- Born: December 1, 1933 (age 92) Portsmouth, Virginia, U.S.
- Height: 5 ft 4 in (164 cm)

Madeline Castle (born December 1, 1933) was an American model. She was Playboy magazine's Playmate of the Month for the October 1954 issue. Her centerfold was photographed by Jack Drebert and Jean Drebert. According to The Playmate Book, Castle was a prominent model in pin-ups and in men's magazines during the 1950s and early 1960s.

== November ==
Diane Hunter

Personal details
- Born: Gale Rita Morris; July 14, 1934 Tacoma, Washington, U.S.
- Died: June 3, 2019 (aged 84)
- Height: 5 ft 5.5 in (166 cm)

Diane Hunter (July 14, 1934 – June 3, 2019) was an American model. She was Playboy magazine's Playmate of the Month for the November 1954 issue. Hunter died of cancer on June 3, 2019, at the age of 84.

== December ==
Terry Ryan

Personal details
- Born: December 1, 1933 (age 92) Fort Hood, Texas, U.S.
- Height: 5 ft 5 in (166 cm)

Terry Ryan (born December 1, 1933) was an American model. She is best known as Playboy magazine's Playmate of the Month for its December 1954 issue.

Ryan's pictorial was the first photographed directly under Playboy's supervision. Prior to this issue, Playboy had purchased layouts from independent photographers.

== See also ==
- List of people in Playboy 1954–59

Margie Harrison	Margaret Scott	Dolores Del Monte	Marilyn Waltz	Joanne Arnold	Margie Harrison
Neva Gilbert	Arline Hunter	Jackie Rainbow	Madeline Castle	Diane Hunter	Terry Ryan
