= Connie Cooper =

Connie Cooper may refer to:

- Connie Cooper on List of Playboy Playmates of 1961#January
- Connie "CeeCee" Cooper, fictional character on Young Sheldon, daughter of Georgie and Mandy
