= List of Playboy Playmates of 2018 =

The following is a list of Playboy Playmates of 2018. Playboy magazine names their Playmate of the Month each month throughout the year.

== January ==
Kayla Garvin

Personal details
- Born: 3 June 1990 (age 35); Eugene, Oregon
- Height: 5 ft 7 in (1.70 m)

Kayla Garvin is the Playboy Playmate of the Month for January 2018 and her pictorial was shot by Dove Shore.

== February ==
Megan Samperi

Personal details
- Born: 22 June 1993 (age 32); Jupiter, Florida
- Height: 5 ft 7 in (1.70 m)

Megan Samperi is the Playboy Playmate of the Month for February 2018 and her pictorial was shot by Christopher von Steinbach.

== March ==
Jenny Watwood

Personal details
- Born: 20 November 1990 (age 34); Mesa, Arizona
- Height: 5 ft 7 in (1.70 m)

Jenny Watwood is the Playboy Playmate of the Month for March 2018 and her pictorial was shot by Derek Kettela.

== April ==
Nereyda Bird

Personal details
- Born: 12 September 1997 (age 27)
- Height: 5 ft 9 in (1.75 m)

Nereyda Bird is a Dominican-American model, and the Playboy Playmate of the Month for April 2018. Her Playmate of the Month pictorial was shot by Vanessa Hollander and Wilson Philippe. She was born in New York City, grew up in Philadelphia, and at the time of her pictorial, was residing in Miami, Florida. She began modeling at the age of 17, and co-owns a north Miami café with her mother called Grab & Go that serves authentic Dominican food.

Bird is represented by Wilhelmina Models.

A self-described tomboy, Bird enjoys drawing, and is a fan of comic books such as Tank Girl. She has said that if she had not become a model she would have been a comic book artist, and she also enjoys yoga, baking and attending arts festivals.

== May ==
Shauna Sexton

Personal details
- Born: 20 January 1996 (age 29); Virginia Beach, Virginia
- Height: 5 ft 8 in (1.73 m)

Shauna Sexton is the Playboy Playmate of the Month for May 2018 and her pictorial was shot by Dove Shore.

== June ==
Cassandra Dawn

Personal details
- Born: 10 January 1990 (age 35); Los Angeles, California
- Height: 5 ft 5 in (1.65 m)

Cassandra Dawn is the Playboy Playmate of the Month for June 2018 and her pictorial was shot by Kyle Deleu.

== July ==
Valeria Lakhina

Personal details
- Born: 25 September 1989 (age 35); Kadiivka, Ukraine
- Height: 5 ft 6 in (1.68 m)

Valeria Lakhina is the Playboy Playmate of the Month for July 2018 and her pictorial was shot by Ana Dias.

== August ==
Lorena Medina
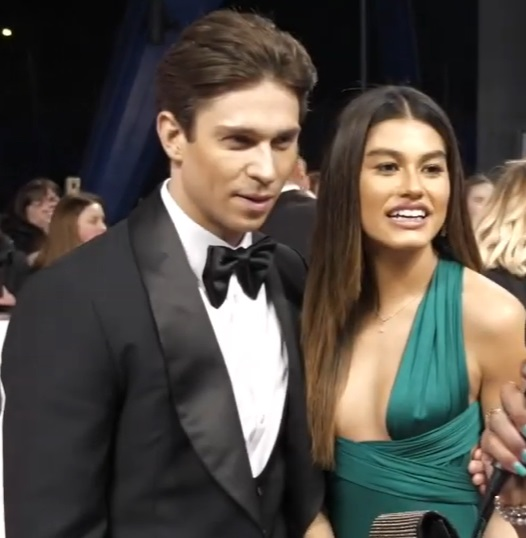
- Medina (right) with UK reality television personality Joey Essex at the 2020 National Television Awards

Personal details
- Born: 18 January 1992 (age 33); Mexico City, Mexico
- Height: 5 ft 6 in (1.68 m)

Lorena Medina is the Playboy Playmate of the Month for August 2018 and her pictorial was shot by Christopher von Steinbach.

== September ==
Kirby Griffin

Personal details
- Born: 14 November 1991 (age 33); Americus, Georgia
- Height: 5 ft 7 in (1.70 m)

Kirby Griffin is the Playboy Playmate of the Month for September 2018 and her pictorial was shot by Ali Mitton.

Griffin was discovered in Miami Beach while vacationing. She joined IMG Models in New York City and has appeared in a multitude of advertising campaigns throughout magazines, billboards, storefronts, websites, music videos, and television commercials around the world.

In 2012, Griffin appeared in the Sports Illustrated Swimsuit Issue.

== October ==
Olga De Mar

Personal details
- Born: 12 August 1991 (age 34); Daugavpils, Latvia
- Height: 5 ft 8 in (1.73 m)

Olga De Mar is the Playboy Playmate of the Month for October 2018 and her pictorial was shot by Ana Dias.

== November ==
Shelby Rose

Personal details
- Born: 25 July 1996 (age 29); Orlando, Florida

Shelby Rose is the Playboy Playmate of the Month for November 2018 and her pictorial was shot by Kyle Deleu.

== December ==
Jordan Emanuel
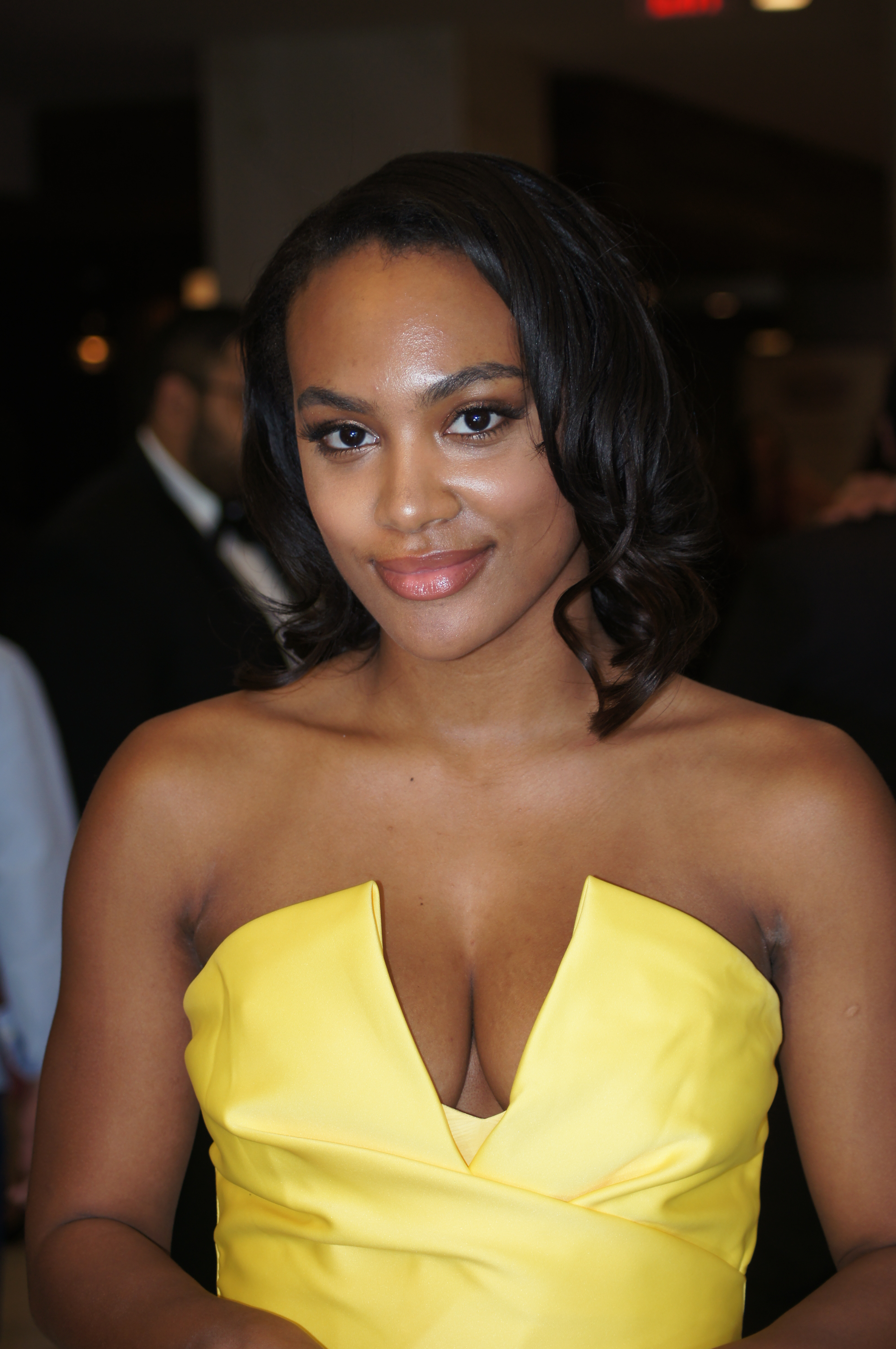
- Emanuel at the White House Correspondents Dinner, 2019

Playboy Playmate of the Year
- 2019
- Preceded by: Nina Daniele

Personal details
- Born: 17 August 1994 (age 31); Baltimore, Maryland
- Height: 5 ft 5 in (1.65 m)

Jordan Emanuel is the Playboy Playmate of the Month for December 2018 and her pictorial was shot by Dove Shore.

== See also ==
- List of people in Playboy 2010–2019
