= List of Playboy Playmates of 2015 =

The following is a list of Playboy Playmates of 2015. Playboy magazine names their Playmate of the Month each month throughout the year.

== January ==
Brittny Ward

Personal details
- Born: May 22, 1990 (age 36) Sacramento, California, United States
- Height: 5 ft 10 in (1.78 m)

Brittny Ward is a model and the Playboy Playmate of the Month for January 2015. Ward is a former beauty pageant competitor and has been modeling since age 12 when her mother submitted her photos to a modeling agency. Her modeling experience includes a TransWorld Surf competition and working with the UFC. On June 12, 2018, Ward got engaged to British Car Racing Driver Jenson Button (2009 Formula One World Champion), after two years of dating and were married four years later, in 2022.

== February ==
Kayslee Collins

Personal details
- Born: March 28, 1991 (age 35) San Diego, California, United States
- Height: 5 ft 9 in (1.75 m)

Kayslee Don Collins is an American singer-songwriter, musician, model and actress, as well as the Playboy Playmate of the Month for February 2015. Her pictorial was shot by Josh Ryan.

== March ==
Chelsie Aryn

Personal details
- Born: September 18, 1992 (age 33) Berne, New York, United States
- Height: 5 ft 5 in (1.65 m)

Chelsie Aryn Miller is a model and the Playboy Playmate of the Month for March 2015. Prior to being selected as a Playmate, Miller was selected as Playboy's Miss Social for March 2011. Her interest in modeling began in high school when she started posting photos taken by her mother, an amateur photographer, on MySpace and began to gain a fanbase. Miller states that her parents, teachers, and high school cheerleading coaches encouraged her to pursue modeling. She has also modeled for Super Street Bikes, Cookie for Him, and NY Rider magazines. Miller is represented by Nista Models, a New York–based modeling agency that specialized in petite size models.

Miller is of Japanese and German descent. According to her Playboy profile, she enjoys listening to country music and is interested in vintage cars and motorcycles. She also revealed that she wanted to be a Playmate since her teens, stating "I scoured my dad's Playboys and was blown away by how drop-dead gorgeous the girls were. I wanted to be part of their family." Miller plans to attend college to study early childhood education.

== April ==
Alexandra Tyler

Personal details
- Born: May 9, 1994 (age 32) Sacramento, California, United States
- Height: 5 ft 9 in (1.75 m)

Alexandra Tyler Abercrombie is a model and the Playboy Playmate of the Month for April 2015.

Encouraged by her mother, Tyler attended an open casting call in Los Angeles while still in high school. After signing with a modeling agency, Tyler wished to pursue modeling full-time. She then accelerated her studies and finished high school a year early. After moving to Los Angeles, she landed campaigns with L'Oréal and Volcom. While in high school, Tyler was a cheerleader and aspired to one day become a special-ed teacher.

== May ==
Brittany Brousseau

Personal details
- Born: October 12, 1988 (age 37) La Mesa, California, United States
- Height: 5 ft 7 in (1.70 m)

Brittany Rene Brousseau is a model and actress. She was the Playboy Playmate of the Month for May 2015. She appeared in the film Joe Dirt 2: Beautiful Loser in 2015.

== June ==
Kaylia Cassandra

Personal details
- Born: March 23, 1990 (age 36) Hershey, Pennsylvania, United States
- Height: 5 ft 6 in (1.68 m) 115 lb (52 kg)

Kaylia Cassandra is a model and the Playmate of the Month for June 2015. Cassandra was a successful fitness model prior to deciding to test for Playboy at Studio West in California. She currently lives in Etters, Pennsylvania where she is attending college.

== July ==
Kayla Rae Reid

Personal details
- Born: July 5, 1991 (age 35) Fairfax, Virginia, United States
- Height: 5 ft 7 in (1.70 m)

Kayla Rae Reid (born July 5, 1991) is a model and the Playboy Playmate of the Month for July 2015. She was married to Olympic Swimmer Ryan Lochte from 2018-2025. and they have three children together.

== August ==
Dominique Jane

Personal details
- Born: May 16, 1988 (age 38) Topanga, California, United States
- Height: 5 ft 7 in (1.70 m)

Dominique Jane Sharpe is a model and the Playboy Playmate of the Month for August 2015.

== September ==
Monica Sims

Personal details
- Born: June 15, 1992 (age 34) Orange County, California, United States
- Height: 5 ft 8 in (1.73 m)

Monica Lee Sims is a model and the Playboy Playmate of the Month for September 2015.

== October ==
Ana Cheri

Personal details
- Born: May 16, 1986 (age 40) Anaheim, California, United States
- Height: 5 ft 7 in (1.70 m)

Ana Cheri Garcia is a model and the Playboy Playmate of the Month for October 2015.

== November ==
Rachel Harris

Personal details
- Born: June 24, 1991 (age 35) Pasadena, California, United States
- Height: 5 ft 3 in (1.60 m)

Rachel Tiare Harris is an artist and the Playboy Playmate of the Month for November 2015. She is from Pasadena, California and was born in Los Angeles County.

== December ==
Eugena Washington

Playboy Playmate of the Year
- 2016
- Preceded by: Dani Mathers
- Succeeded by: Brook Power

Personal details
- Born: October 8, 1984 (age 41) Columbia, South Carolina, United States
- Height: 5 ft 9.5 in (1.765 m)

Eugena Washington is a fashion model, contestant (second runner-up) of America's Next Top Model (cycle 7). She was named Playmate of the Month for December 2015, and later Playmate of the Year for 2016. She was the third black model to be so named, the first to be named in Playboy's post-nude era, and the last Playmate of the Year to be chosen by Hugh Hefner himself at the Playboy Mansion, before he stepped down from the company in late 2016 and his son, Cooper Hefner, briefly succeeded him before Hugh's death in 2017.

== See also ==
- List of people in Playboy 2010–2019
