= Nicely =

Nicely is a surname. Notable people with the surname include:

- Jonnie Nicely (1936–2013), American model
- Nick Nicely (born 1959), British singer-songwriter
- Thomas Ray Nicely (1943–2019), US mathematician, discoverer of the Pentium FDIV bug

== See also ==
- Niceley, people with this surname
