= Susie Scott =

Susie Scott may refer to:

- Susie Scott (model) (1960 Playboy Playmate)
- Susie Scott Krabacher (1983 Playboy Playmate)
