= List of Playboy Playmates of 2013 =

The following is a list of Playboy Playmates of 2013. Playboy magazine names their Playmate of the Month each month throughout the year.

== January ==
Karina Marie

Personal details
- Born: February 5, 1984 (age 42) Basildon, England
- Height: 5 ft 8 in (1.73 m)

Karina Marie (born February 5, 1984) is the Playboy Playmate of the Month for January 2013. Her centerfold was photographed by Sasha Eisenman. She is the fourteenth British Playmate.

== February ==
Shawn Dillon

Personal details
- Born: June 7, 1986 (age 40) Sarasota, Florida
- Height: 5 ft 7 in (1.70 m)

Shawn Michelle Dillon (born June 7, 1986) is the Playboy Playmate of the Month for February 2013. Her centerfold was photographed by Tony Kelly.

== March ==
Ashley Doris

Personal details
- Born: November 1, 1989 (age 36) West Hartford, Connecticut
- Height: 5 ft 5 in (1.65 m)

Ashley Doris Wilson (born November 1, 1989) is the Playboy Playmate of the Month for March 2013. Her centerfold was photographed by Sasha Eisenman and she is the first Playmate from Connecticut.

== April ==
Jaslyn Ome

Personal details
- Born: July 21, 1991 (age 35) Hayward, California
- Height: 5 ft 5 in (1.65 m)

Jaslyn Renee Ome (born July 21, 1991) is the Playboy Playmate of the Month for April 2013. She is of East Indian, African-American, and Caucasian descent. She graduated from Oak Ridge High school in 2009 and went on to Sacramento State University and Folsom Lake College to study communications. Her centerfold was photographed by Stephen Wayda.

== May ==
Kristen Nicole

Personal details
- Born: November 15, 1989 (age 36) Escondido, California
- Height: 5 ft 9 in (1.75 m)

Kristen Nicole Sanne (born November 15, 1989) is the Playboy Playmate of the Month for May 2013. Her centerfold was photographed by Josh Ryan.

== June ==
Audrey Aleen Allen
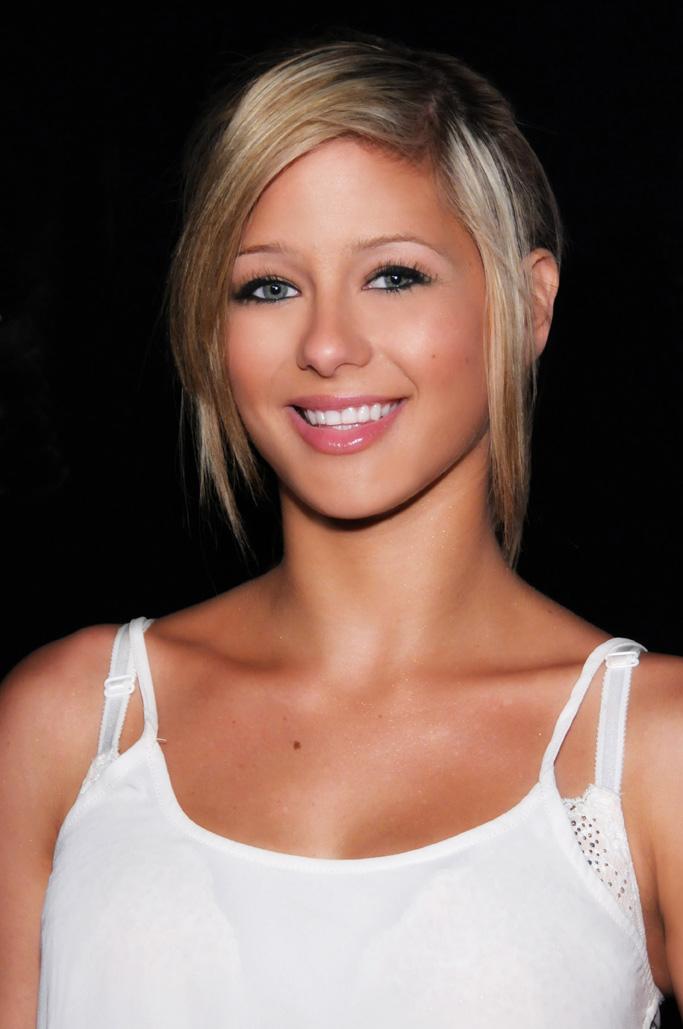
- Allen in 2013

Personal details
- Born: April 8, 1991 (age 35) Edina, Minnesota
- Height: 5 ft 2 in (1.57 m)

Audrey Aleen Allen (born April 8, 1991) (also known as Audrey Andelise) is the Playboy Playmate of the Month for June 2013. Her centerfold was photographed by Sasha Eisenman. She also has a sister, Anna Karina Allen (known as Anna Andelise), who is also a model and had auditioned for Playboy with her.

== July ==
Alyssa Arcè

Personal details
- Born: February 27, 1992 (age 34) North Myrtle Beach, South Carolina
- Height: 5 ft 8 in (1.73 m)

Alyssa Arcè (born February 27, 1992) is the Playboy Playmate of the Month for July 2013. Her centerfold was photographed by Sasha Eisenmann.

== August ==
Val Keil
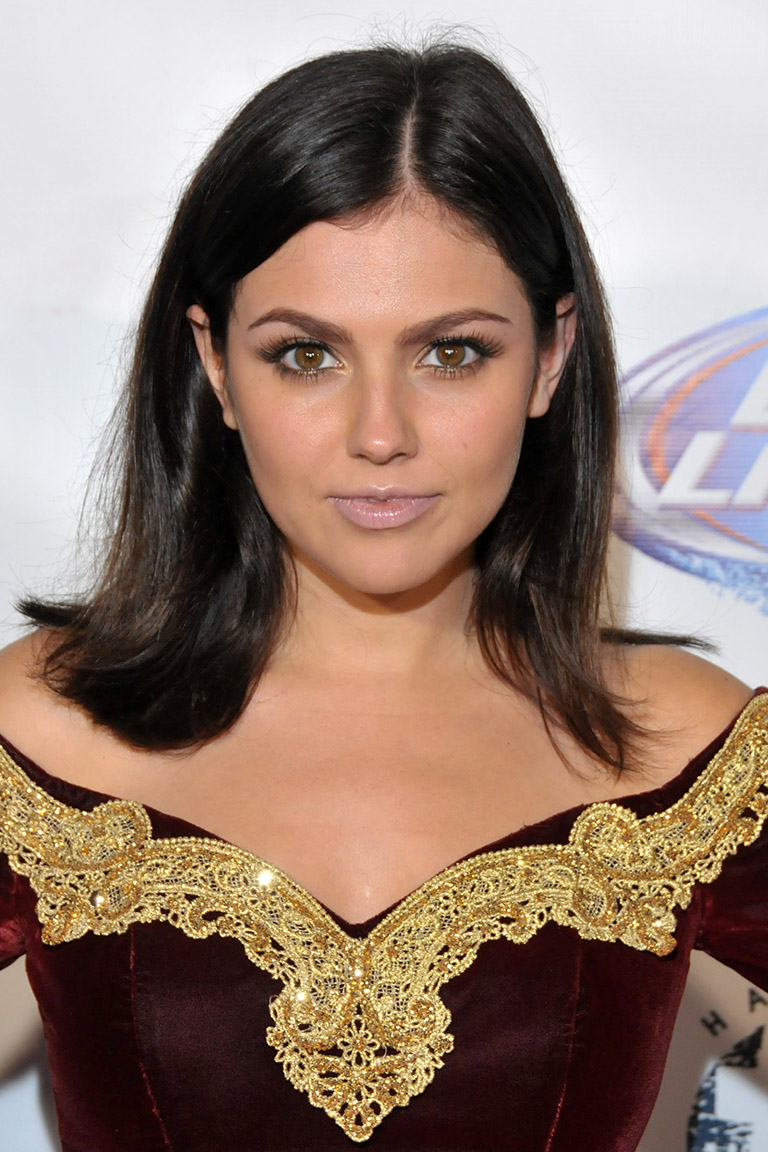
- Keil in 2014

Personal details
- Born: January 4, 1991 (age 35) Philadelphia, Pennsylvania
- Height: 5 ft 4 in (1.63 m)

Valerie Keil (born January 4, 1991) is the Playboy Playmate of the Month for August 2013. Her centerfold was photographed by Josh Ryan. Since her pictorial she has appeared on the crime drama series CSI.

== September ==
Bryiana Noelle

Personal details
- Born: July 21, 1991 (age 35) Salinas, California
- Height: 5 ft 3 in (1.60 m)

Bryiana Noelle Flores (born July 21, 1991) is the Playboy Playmate of the Month for September 2013. Her centerfold was photographed by Josh Ryan.

== October ==
Carly Lauren
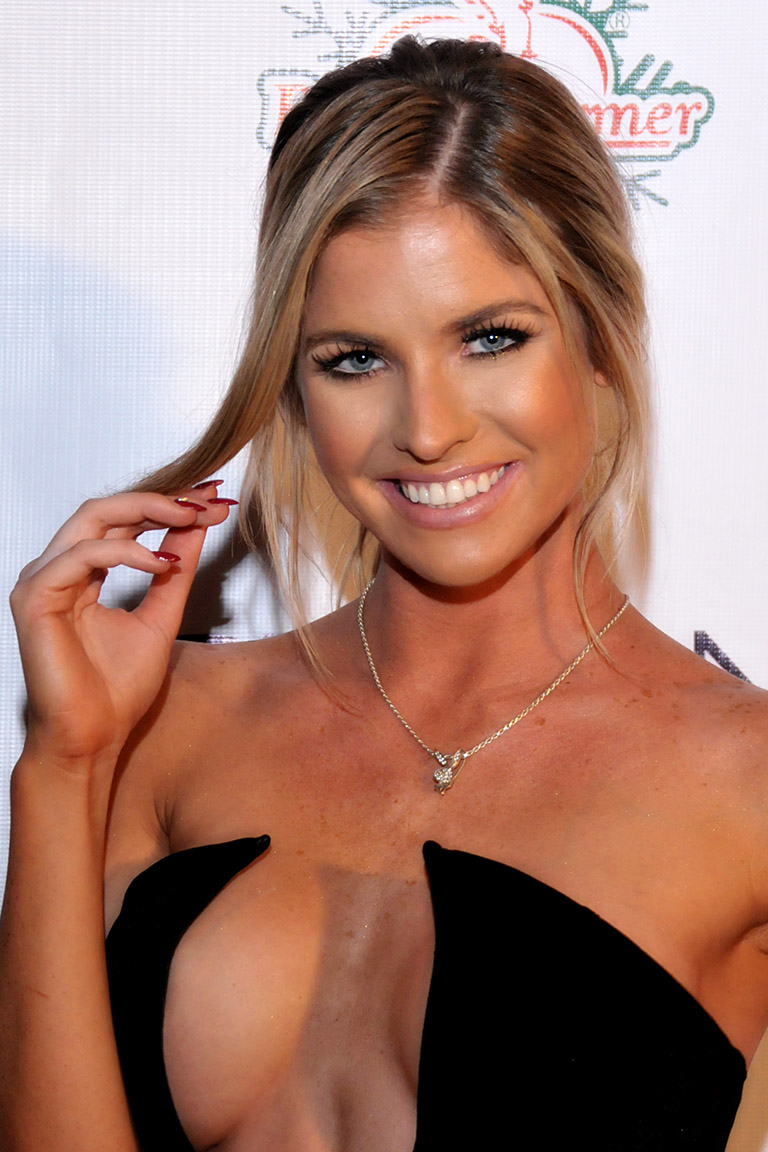
- Lauren in 2014

Personal details
- Born: July 3, 1990 (age 36) West Hills, California
- Height: 5 ft 9 in (1.75 m)

Carly Lauren (born July 3, 1990) is the Playboy Playmate of the Month for October 2013. Her centerfold was photographed by Josh Ryan. Lauren has appeared on television shows including Suburgatory and Rules of Engagement.

== November ==
Gemma Lee Farrell

Personal details
- Born: January 15, 1988 (age 38) Pirongia, New Zealand
- Height: 5 ft 8 in (1.73 m)

Gemma Lee Farrell (born January 15, 1988) is the Playboy Playmate of the Month for November 2013 and the first "Kiwi" Playmate, a New Zealander. Her centerfold was photographed by Sasha Eisenmann. After reaching 420,000 followers on Instagram, Farrell featured as the "Instagram Girl of the Week" on Maxim magazine's website.

== December ==
Kennedy Summers
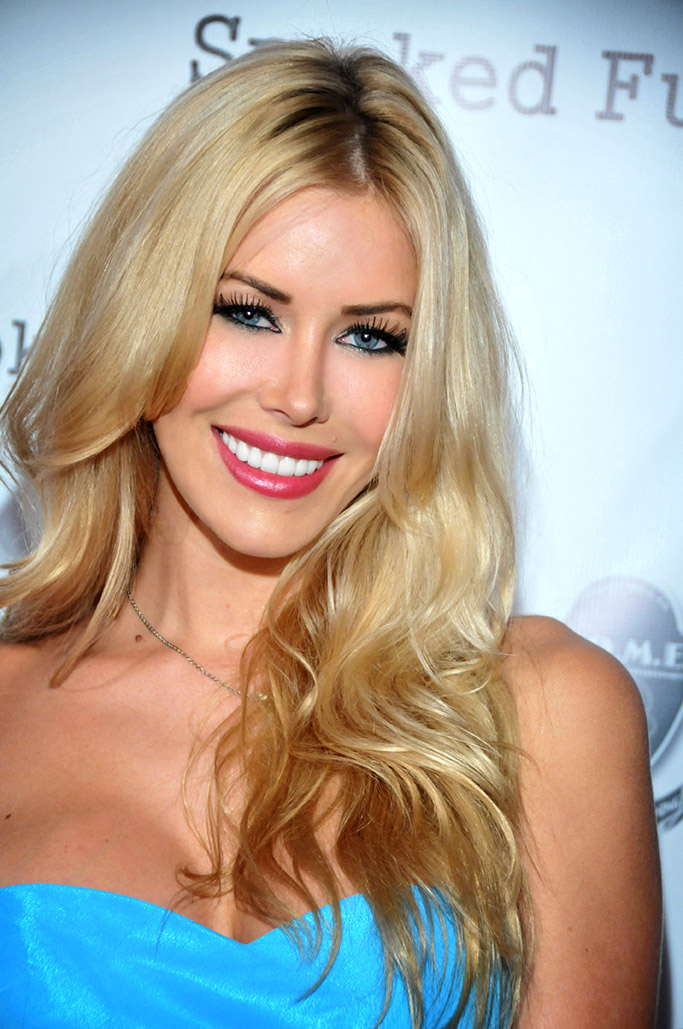
- Summers in 2014

Playboy Playmate of the Year
- 2014
- Preceded by: Raquel Pomplun
- Succeeded by: Dani Mathers

Personal details
- Born: March 3, 1987 (age 39) Berlin, Germany
- Height: 5 ft 8.5 in (1.740 m)

Kennedy Summers (born March 3, 1987) is the Playboy Playmate of the Month for December 2013 and the Playboy Playmate of the Year for 2014. Her centerfold was shot by Josh Ryan.

== See also ==
- List of people in Playboy 2010–2019
