= Peter Basch =

American photographer (1921–2004)

Peter Basch (September 23, 1921 – March 15, 2004) was an American magazine and glamour photographer. He was born in Berlin, lived and died in New York City. The main body of his work was produced in the fifties and sixties.

== Early life ==
Peter Basch was born in Berlin, Germany, the only child of Felix Basch and Grete Basch-Freund, both prominent theater and film personalities of the German-speaking world.

In 1933 the family came to New York due to fears of rising anti-Jewish sentiment and laws in Germany. The family had US citizenship because Felix's father, Arthur Basch, was a wine trader who lived in San Francisco. After moving back to Germany, Arthur Basch kept his American citizenship, and passed it to his children and, thence, to his grandchildren.

== United States ==
When the Basch family arrived in New York in 1933, they opened a restaurant on Central Park South in the Navarro Hotel. The restaurant, Gretel's Viennese, became a hangout for the Austrian expatriate community. Peter Basch had his first job there as a waiter. While in New York, Basch attended the De Witt Clinton High School. The family moved to Los Angeles to assist in Basch's father's career, during which time Basch went to school in England. Upon returning to the United States, Basch joined the Army. He was mobilized in the US Army Air Forces' First Motion Picture Unit, where he worked as a script boy.

== Career ==
After the war, he started attending UCLA, but his mother asked him to join her back in New York. His parents had decided that Basch should be a photographer, and they obtained a photography studio for their son.

For over twenty years, Peter Basch's had a successful career as a magazine photographer. He was known for his images of celebrities, artists, dancers, actors, starlets, and glamour-girls in America and Europe. His photos appeared in many major magazines such as Life, Look and Playboy.

=== Publications ===
Basch authored and co-authored a number of books containing his photographs.

==== Partial bibliography ====
- Candid Photography (1958 with Peter Gowland and Don Ornitz)
- Peter Basch's Glamour Photography (A Fawcett How-To Book) (1958)
- Peter Basch photographs beauties of the world (1958)
- Camera in Rome (1963 with Nathan and Simon Basch)
- Peter Basch Photographs 100 Famous Beauties (1965)
- The nude as form and figure (1966)
- Put a Girl in Your Pocket: The Artful Camera of Peter Basch (1969)
- Peter Basch's Guide to Figure Photography (1975 with Jack Rey)

== People photographed by Peter Basch ==
- Anouk Aimée
- Anita Ekberg
- Ursula Andress
- Barbara Bain
- Carroll Baker
- Brigitte Bardot
- Jean-Paul Belmondo
- Candice Bergen
- Senta Berger
- Marlon Brando
- Horst Buchholz
- Maria Callas
- Capucine
- Claudia Cardinale
- Joan Collins
- Jean Cocteau
- Salvador Dalí
- Catherine Deneuve
- Marlene Dietrich
- Karin Dor
- Françoise Dorléac
- Anita Ekberg
- Jane Fonda
- James Garner
- William Holden
- Rock Hudson
- Christine Kaufmann
- Grace Kelly
- Hildegard Knef
- Daliah Lavi
- Janet Leigh
- Gina Lollobrigida
- Sophia Loren
- Antonella Lualdi
- Silvana Mangano
- Jayne Mansfield
- Lee Marvin
- Marcello Mastroianni
- Micki Marlo
- Wayne Maunder
- Marilyn Monroe
- Jeanne Moreau
- Michèle Morgan
- Julie Newmar
- Ruth Niehaus
- Kim Novak
- Uschi Obermaier
- Bettie Page
- Gregory Peck
- Anthony Perkins
- Diana Ross
- Eva Marie Saint
- Isabel Sarli
- Maria Schell
- Romy Schneider
- Jean Seberg
- Elke Sommer
- Alexandra Stewart
- Susan Strasberg
- Sharon Tate
- Elizabeth Taylor
- Nadja Tiller
- Natalie Wood
- Alida Valli
- Marie Versini
- Monica Vitti
- Susan Harrison

== Personal life ==
In 1950 Peter met Jacqueline Clara Marie-Marguerite Bertrand, a model/actress from Quebec. They were married in 1951. The couple had a daughter, Michele, in 1952, and a son, Peter Michael, 1956.
