= Melinda Windsor =

American Playboy Playmate (born 1944)

Playboy centerfold appearance
- February 1966
- Preceded by: Judy Tyler
- Succeeded by: Priscilla Wright

Personal details
- Born: Ann Brockway; June 25, 1944 (age 80); Akron, Ohio, U.S.
- Height: 5 ft 4 in (1.63 m)

Melinda Windsor (born June 25, 1944) was the pseudonym used by Ann Brockway, a 21-year-old student at the University of California, Los Angeles who was Playboy magazine's Playmate of the Month for its February 1966 issue. Her centerfold was photographed by Tony Marco. She received her bachelor's degree in 1966.

Windsor was born in Akron, Ohio. She was working as an insurance rater and taking night classes at UCLA. She was going to use the money she earned posing for Playboy to finish her degree and then attend graduate school; her goal was to get a PhD and become a teacher.

A small controversy arose after her appearance in Playboy. In a newspaper article, the university stated that they had no one by the name of "Melinda Windsor" enrolled. Readers of the magazine wrote to Playboy asking if they had their facts straight. Playboy responded that "Melinda" was a student at UCLA in the fall of 1965 when she posed, but was not enrolled during the winter of 1966 and that she had used a pseudonym.

Windsor was photographed by Alexas Urba for the January 1967 issue of Playboy, and by Morton Tadder for the fall 1967 issue of VIP magazine.

== Identity research ==
In a 2016 Akron, Ohio newspaper column in the Akron Beacon-Journal, journalist Bob Dyer requested information about Windsor, hoping to honor Akron's "mystery playmate" on the 50th anniversary of her appearance in Playboy. Her name was publicly revealed to be Ann Brockway in the 22 December 1966 Decatur Daily Review.

== See also ==
- List of people in Playboy 1960–1969

Judy Tyler	Melinda Windsor	Priscilla Wright	Karla Conway	Dolly Read	Kelly Burke
Tish Howard	Susan Denberg	Dianne Chandler	Linda Moon	Lisa Baker	Susan Bernard
