= DeDe Lind =

American glamour model (1947–2020)

- Born: Diane Gayle Lind; April 15, 1947; Los Angeles, California], U.S.
- Died: February 4, 2020 (aged 72); Boca Raton, Florida, U.S.
- Occupation: model
Playboy centerfold appearance
- August 1967
- Preceded by: Heather Ryan
- Succeeded by: Angela Dorian
Personal details
- Height: 5 ft 2 in (1.57 m)

DeDe Lind (born Diane Gayle Lind) was an American glamour model famous for her appearance in Playboy magazine as the Playmate of the Month for August 1967.

== Biography ==
=== Playboy ===
Lind's photographer friend, Leon, talked her into testing for Playboy. At 19, she was selected to be the Playboy Playmate for August 1967. The photography was done by Mario Casilli. Lind received more fan mail than any other Playboy Playmate in history.

Lind's color likeness traveled to space. The November 1969 Playboy calendar photo of Lind was on Apollo 12. The ground crew for the mission stashed the photo, which they labeled "MAP OF A HEAVENLY BODY" inside a locker aboard the command module Yankee Clipper. Astronaut Richard Gordon, the command module pilot of the Yankee Clipper, put the photo up for auction in 2011 for a minimum bid of US$1000 (equivalent to $1,431 in 2025). The winning bid was for US$21,013.20 (equivalent to $30,074 in 2025).

=== Later career ===
Lind appeared in the December 1979 issue of Playmates Forever and, in the early 1980s, in the first "Playmate Playoffs" special issue. Her video appearances for Playboy included Race Horses and a frontal-nudity appearance on a sailing yacht. She was also the subject for "Playmates Revisited" in the March 1996 issue.

As of 1999, Lind resided in Boca Raton, Florida.

=== Death ===
DeDe died February 4, 2020, from ovarian cancer in Boca Raton, Florida, at the age of 72.

== Filmography ==
- Playboy: 50 Years of Playmates (2004) (V)
- Playboy: The Party Continues (2000) (TV)
- Video Centerfold: Sherry Arnett (1985) (V)
- Playboy After Dark (First Episode) (1968) (TV)

== See also ==
- List of people in Playboy 1960–1969

| Surrey Marshe | Kim Farber | Fran Gerard | Gwen Wong | Anne Randall | Joey Gibson |
| Heather Ryan | DeDe Lind | Angela Dorian | Reagan Wilson | Kaya Christian | Lynn Winchell |
