= List of Playboy Playmates of 1961 =

The following is a list of Playboy Playmates of 1961. Playboy magazine names its Playmate of the Month each month throughout the year.

== January ==
Connie Cooper

Personal details
- Born: September 20, 1941 (age 83); New York City, NY
- Height: 5 ft 5 in (165 cm)

Connie Cooper (born September 20, 1941) is an Italian-American model. She was Playboy magazine's Playmate of the Month for its January 1961 issue. Her centerfold was photographed by Paul Morton Smith.

According to The Playmate Book, she also attended college courses to study real estate and later became a wife and mother.

== February ==
Barbara Ann Lawford

Personal details
- Born: October 7, 1942 (age 82); New York City, NY
- Height: 5 ft 7 in (170 cm)

Barbara Ann Lawford (born October 7, 1942) is an American model. She was Playboy magazine's Playmate of the Month for its February 1961 issue. Her centerfold was photographed by Mario Casilli. She also appeared on the cover of the September 1961 issue.

== March ==
Tonya Crews

Personal details
- Born: Alice Crews; February 2, 1938; Oklahoma, U.S.
- Died: August 7, 1966 (aged 28)
- Height: 5 ft 4 in (163 cm)

Tonya Crews (born Alice Crews; February 2, 1938 – August 7, 1966) was a Choctaw American model. She was Playboy magazine's Playmate of the Month for its March 1961 issue. Her centerfold was photographed by Mario Casilli. Crews died in an automobile accident in 1966.

== April ==
Nancy Nielsen

Personal details
- Born: December 14, 1940 (age 84); California, U.S.
- Height: 5 ft 7 in (170 cm)

Nancy Nielsen (born December 14, 1940) is an American model. She was Playmate of the Month for its April 1961 issue. Her centerfold was photographed by Lawrence Schiller.

== May ==
Susan Kelly

Personal details
- Born: February 15, 1938 (age 87); Oklahoma, U.S.
- Height: 5 ft 3 in (160 cm)

Susan Kelly (born February 15, 1938) is an American model and actress. She was Playboy magazine's Playmate of the Month for its May 1961 issue. Her centerfold was photographed by Frank Bez.

== June ==
Heidi Becker

Personal details
- Born: October 11, 1940 (age 84); Klagenfurt, Austria
- Height: 5 ft 4 in (163 cm)

Heidi Becker (born October 11, 1940) is an Austrian-born model. She was Playboy magazine's Playmate of the Month for its June 1961 issue.

Her centerfold was photographed by Mario Casilli.

In December 1979 she again posed semi-nude for Playboy for the "Playmates Forever!" pictorial.

Becker attended the University of Wisconsin.

== July ==
Sheralee Conners

Personal details
- Born: December 12, 1941 (age 83); New York City, NY
- Height: 5 ft 9 in (175 cm)

Sheralee Conners (born December 12, 1941) is an American model. She was Playboy magazine's Playmate of the Month for its July 1961 issue.

Her centerfold was photographed by William Crespinal and Sherman Weisburd.

Conners also was the model for the unusual double-sided cover of the December 1962 issue.

== August ==
Karen Thompson

Personal details
- Born: September 4, 1939 (age 85); New York City, NY
- Height: 5 ft 4 in (163 cm)

Karen Thompson is an American model and actress. She was Playboy magazine's Playmate of the Month for its August 1961 issue.

Her centerfold was photographed by Mario Casilli.

== September ==
Christa Speck

Playboy Playmate of the Year
- 1962
- Preceded by: Linda Gamble
- Succeeded by: June Cochran

Personal details
- Born: August 1, 1942; Danzig, Germany
- Died: March 22, 2013 (aged 70); Los Angeles, California, U.S.
- Height: 5 ft 5 in (165 cm)

Christa Speck (August 1, 1942 – March 22, 2013) was a German model. She was Playboy magazine's Playmate of the Month for September 1961, and the 1962 Playmate of the Year.

Her original pictorial was photographed by Sam Wu.

Her centerfold is seen in the 1978 film Animal House, which takes place in 1962.

Speck married TV producer Marty Krofft.

== October ==
Jean Cannon

Personal details
- Born: October 5, 1941; Long Island, New York
- Died: November 17, 2005 (aged 64); Pembroke Pines, Florida
- Height: 5 ft 4 in (163 cm)

Jean Cannon (October 5, 1941 – November 17, 2005) was an American model. She was Playboy magazine's Playmate of the Month for its October 1961 issue.

Her centerfold was photographed by Ron Vogel.

She died on November 17, 2005, in Pembroke Pines, Florida. Her cause of death was not disclosed, but according to The Playmate Book, she had been diagnosed with terminal cancer in 2002.

== November ==
Dianne Danford

Personal details
- Born: August 9, 1938 (age 86); Chicago, IL
- Height: 5 ft 7 in (170 cm)

Dianne Danford (born August 9, 1938) is an American model. She was Playboy magazine's Playmate of the Month for its November 1961 issue.

Her centerfold was photographed by Mario Casilli.

In 1966, she appeared in a horror film, Weekend of Fear, directed, written and produced by Joe Danford.

== December ==
Lynn Karrol

Personal details
- Born: July 31, 1939 (age 85); Pittsburgh, Pennsylvania, U.S.
- Height: 5 ft 6.5 in (169 cm)

Lynn Karrol (born July 31, 1939) is an American model. She was Playboy magazine's Playmate of the Month for its December 1961 issue. Her centerfold was photographed by Frank Eck.

== See also ==
- List of people in Playboy 1960–1969
