= Willy Rey =

Canadian model (born 1949)

Playboy centerfold appearance
- February 1971
- Preceded by: Liv Lindeland
- Succeeded by: Cynthia Hall

Personal details
- Born: 25 August 1949 Rotterdam, the Netherlands
- Died: 19 August 1973 (aged 23) Vancouver, British Columbia, Canada
- Height: 5 ft 4 in (1.63 m)

Willy Rey (born Wilhelmina Rietveld, 25 August 1949 – 19 August 1973) was a Dutch-Canadian model. She was Playboy magazine's Playmate of the Month for its February 1971 issue. Her centerfold was photographed by Mario Casilli.

When she was six years old, her family moved from the Netherlands to Canada.

Willy Rey's nude likeness adorned the stock certificate of Playboy Enterprises at the time of its initial public offering on 3 November 1971.

She died of an overdose of barbiturates (sleeping pills) in Vancouver on 19 August 1973.

== See also ==
- List of people in Playboy 1970–1979

Liv Lindeland	Willy Rey	Cynthia Hall	Chris Cranston	Janice Pennington	Lieko English
Heather Van Every	Cathy Rowland	Crystal Smith	Claire Rambeau	Danielle de Vabre	Karen Christy
