= Niceley =

Niceley is an English surname. Notable people with the surname include:

- Frank Niceley (1947–2025), American politician in Tennessee
- Ted Niceley, American record producer, active since 1984

== See also ==
- Nicely, people with this surname
