= List of Playboy Playmates of 1955 =

The following is a list of Playboy Playmates of 1955. Playboy magazine named its Playmate of the Month each month throughout the year.

== January ==
Bettie Page
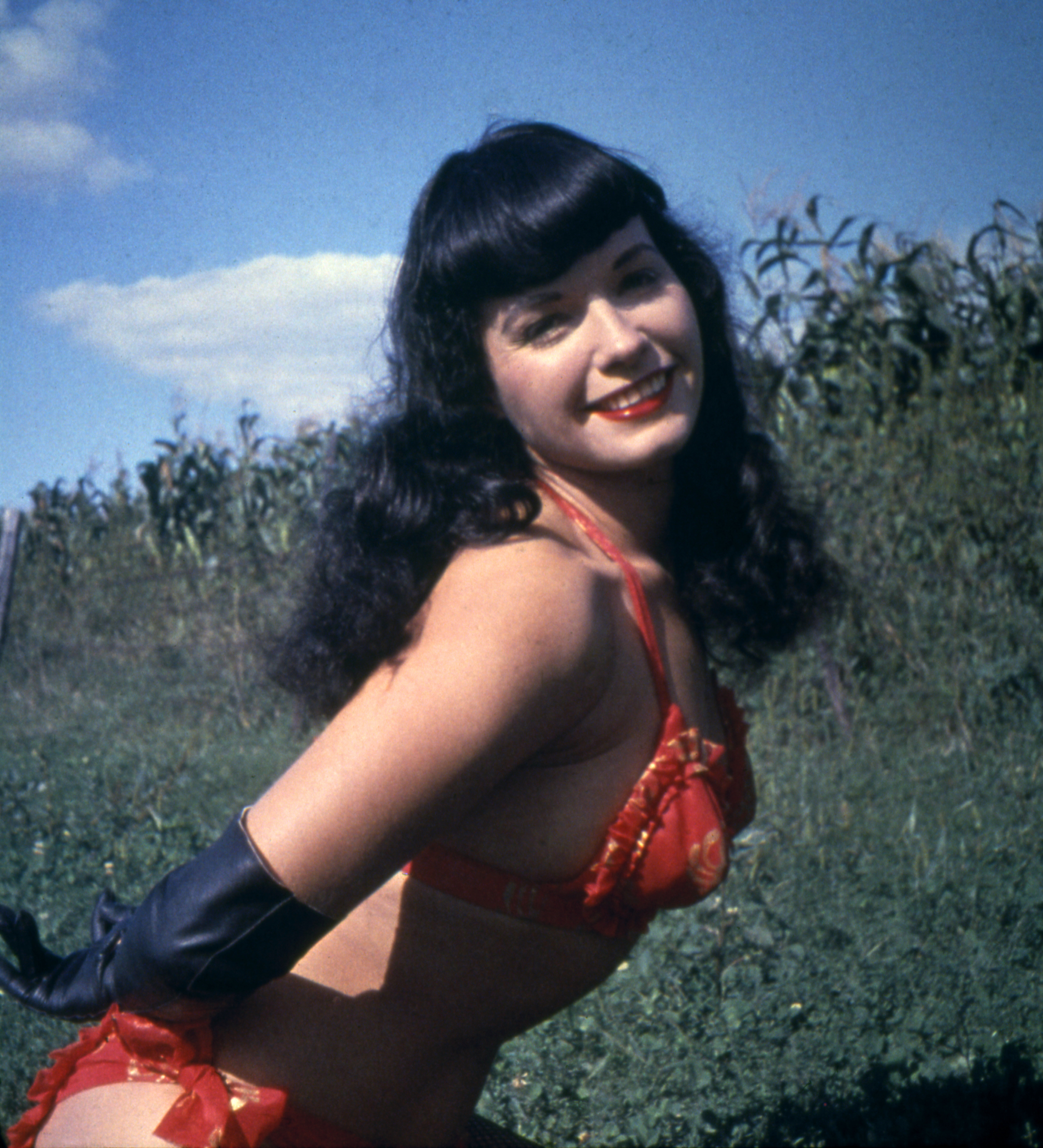

Personal details
- Born: Betty Mae Page; April 22, 1923; Nashville, Tennessee, U.S.
- Died: December 11, 2008 (aged 85); Los Angeles, California, U.S.
- Height: 5 ft 5.5 in (166 cm)

Bettie Page (April 22, 1923 – December 11, 2008) was an American model who became famous in the 1950s for her fetish modeling and pin-up photos. She has often been called the "Queen of pinups". Her look, including her jet black hair and trademark bangs, has influenced many artists. She was also one of the earliest Playmates of the Month for Playboy magazine.

== February ==
Jayne Mansfield
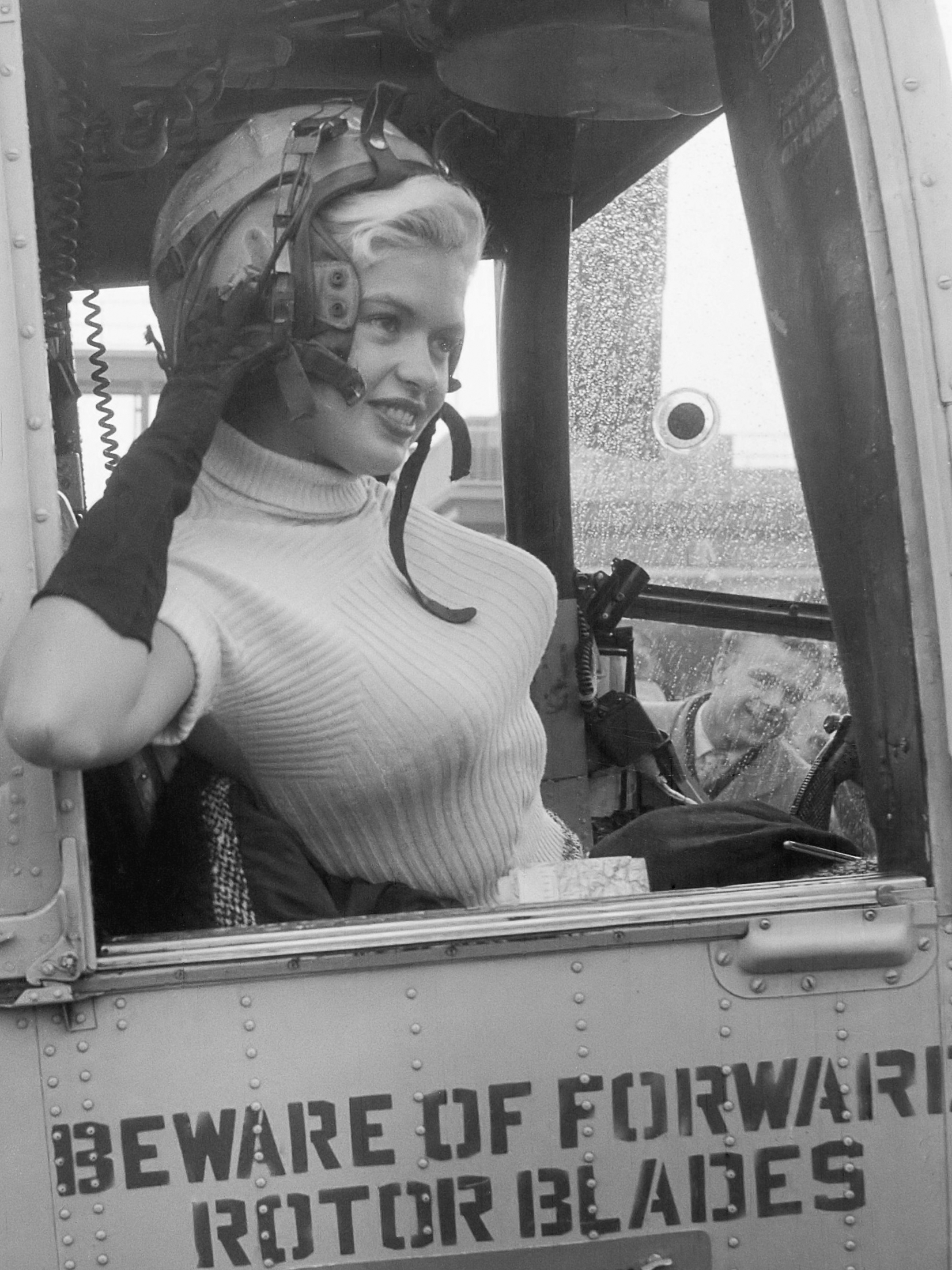

Personal details
- Born: Vera Jayne Palmer; April 19, 1933; Bryn Mawr, Pennsylvania, U.S.
- Died: June 29, 1967 (aged 34); Slidell, Louisiana, U.S.
- Height: 5 ft 5.5 in (166 cm)

Jayne Mansfield (April 19, 1933 – June 29, 1967) was an American actress working both on Broadway and in Hollywood. One of the leading blonde sex symbols of the 1950s, Mansfield starred in several popular Hollywood films that emphasized her platinum-blonde hair, hourglass figure and cleavage-revealing costumes. Mansfield had been a Playboy Playmate of the Month and appeared in the magazine several additional times. She died in an automobile accident at age 34.

== March ==
No issue was published for March 1955.

== April ==
Marilyn Waltz (a.k.a. Margaret Scott)

Personal details
- Born: Marilyn Ardith Waltz; November 5, 1931; Waukesha, Wisconsin, U.S.
- Died: December 23, 2006 (aged 75); Medford, Oregon, U.S.
- Height: 5 ft 4 in (163 cm)

Marilyn Ardith Waltz (November 5, 1931 – December 23, 2006) was an American actress and model. She was Playboy's Playmate of the Month in the February 1954, April 1954, and April 1955 issues.

She was the first of two women to become a three-time Playmate (the other being Janet Pilgrim). In her first Playboy appearance, Waltz was billed as Margaret Scott. For years thereafter, many assumed that Marilyn and Margaret were two different women. It was not until the mid-1990s that they were determined to be one and the same.

== May ==
Marguerite Empey

Personal details
- Born: Diane Marguerite Empey; July 29, 1932; Los Angeles, California, U.S.
- Died: August 19, 2008 (aged 76); Los Angeles, California, U.S.
- Height: 5 ft 2 in (160 cm)

Marguerite Empey (July 29, 1932 – August 19, 2008) was an American model, dancer and actress. She was Playboy magazine's Playmate of the Month in May 1955 and in February 1956. The photos for her 1956 appearance were taken by soft core porn director Russ Meyer.

== June ==
Eve Meyer

Personal details
- Born: Evelyn Eugene Turner; December 13, 1928; Atlanta, Georgia, U.S.
- Died: March 27, 1977 (aged 48); Tenerife, Canary Islands
- Height: 5 ft 6 in (168 cm)

Eve Meyer (December 13, 1928 – March 27, 1977) was an American pin-up model, motion picture actress, and later, film producer. Much of her work was done in conjunction with sexploitation filmmaker Russ Meyer to whom she was married from April 2, 1952, until 1969. Eve perished in the Tenerife airport disaster on board Pan Am Flight 1736.

== July ==
Janet Pilgrim

Personal details
- Born: Charlaine Edith Karalus; June 13, 1934; Wheaton, Illinois, U.S.
- Died: May 1, 2017 (aged 82); Norwalk, Connecticut, U.S.
- Height: 5 ft 6 in (168 cm)

Janet Pilgrim (June 13, 1934 – May 1, 2017) was an American model and office worker for Playboy. She was chosen as Playboy's Playmate of the Month three times: July 1955, December 1955 and October 1956.

== August ==
Pat Lawler

Personal details
- Born: Patricia Joan Lawler; December 29, 1933; Burbank, California, U.S.
- Died: November 21, 2017 (aged 83); Oakhurst, California
- Height: 5 ft 4 in (165 cm)

Pat Lawler (December 29, 1933 – November 21, 2017) was an American model. She was Playboy magazine's Playmate of the Month for the August 1955 issue. Her centerfold was photographed by Hal Adams. Lawler died in Oakhurst, California on November 21, 2017, at the age of 83.

== September ==
Anne Fleming

Personal details
- Born: October 4, 1930 (age 94); Fort Sill, Oklahoma, U.S.
- Height: 5 ft 3 in (162 cm)

Anne Fleming (born October 4, 1930) is an American actress and model. She was Playboy magazine's Playmate of the Month for the September 1955 issue. Her centerfold was photographed by Hal Adams.

== October ==
Jean Moorhead
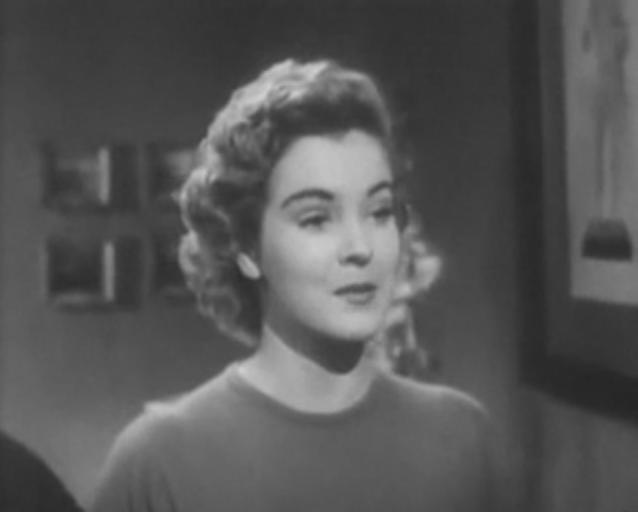

Personal details
- Born: Barbara Jean Moorhead; February 4, 1935 (age 90); Knoxville, Tennessee, U.S.
- Height: 5 ft 4 in (165 cm)

Jean Moorhead (born February 4, 1935) is an American actress and model. Using the slightly differently spelled name Jean Moorehead, she was Playboy magazine's Playmate of the Month for the October 1955 issue. Her centerfold was photographed by Hal Adams. A former Miss Hollywood, Moorhead acted in television and in movies such as the Ed Wood-scripted The Violent Years (1956).

== November ==
Barbara Cameron

Personal details
- Born: March 21, 1930 (age 95); Los Angeles, California, U.S.
- Height: 5 ft 5 in (167 cm)

Barbara Cameron is an American model. She was Playboy magazine's Playmate of the Month for its November 1955 issue. Her centerfold was photographed by Lawrence Tirschel.

== December ==
See July entry above

== See also ==
- List of people in Playboy 1953–59

Bettie Page	Jayne Mansfield	(no Playmate)	Marilyn Waltz	Marguerite Empey	Eve Meyer
Janet Pilgrim	Pat Lawler	Anne Fleming	Jean Moorhead	Barbara Cameron	Janet Pilgrim
