= List of Playboy Playmates of 1956 =

The following is a list of Playboy Playmates of 1956. Playboy magazine named its Playmate of the Month each month throughout the year.

== January ==
Lynn Turner

Personal details
- Born: December 1, 1935 (age 90) California, U.S.
- Height: 5 ft 4 in (163 cm)

Lynn Turner (born December 1, 1935) was an American model. She was Playboy magazine's Playmate of the Month for the January 1956 issue. Her centerfold was photographed by Peter Gowland, the first of his extensive Playboy career. According to The Playmate Book, Turner did layouts for other men's magazines, including Frolic, Jest and Modern Man Quarterly.

== February ==
Marguerite Empey

Personal details
- Born: Diane Marguerite Webber; July 29, 1932 Los Angeles, California, U.S.
- Died: August 19, 2008 (aged 76) Los Angeles, California, U.S.
- Height: 5 ft 2 in (157 cm)

Marguerite Empey (July 29, 1932 – August 19, 2008) was an American model, dancer and actress. She was Playboy magazine's Playmate of the Month in May 1955 and February 1956. The photos for her 1956 appearance were taken by soft core porn director Russ Meyer.

== March ==
Marian Stafford

Personal details
- Born: February 7, 1931 Houston, Texas, U.S.
- Died: August 16, 1984 (aged 53)
- Height: 5 ft 3 in (160 cm)

Marian Stafford (February 7, 1931 – August 16, 1984) Born Doris Marian Stafford, was an American actress and model. She was Playboy magazine's Playmate of the Month for the March 1956 issue. Her centerfold was photographed by Ruth Sondak, and was the first to fold out to three pages. (Prior to this, the centerfolds covered two pages.) In addition to posing for other men's magazines in the decade, Stafford became a popular personality during the so-called Golden Age of Television. She was a regular on game shows such as Treasure Hunt and The $64,000 Question. She was crowned Miss Color TV of 1956 by NBC.

Marian died on August 16, 1984, at age 50.

== April ==
Rusty Fisher

Personal details
- Born: April 5, 1935 (age 91) Colorado, U.S.
- Height: 5 ft 5.5 in (166 cm)

Rusty Fisher (born April 5, 1935) was an American model. She was Playboy magazine's Playmate of the Month for the April 1956 issue. Her centerfold was photographed by Sam Wu. Prior to her Playboy appearance, she had posed for several other men's magazines, often under other pseudonyms such as Rusty Williams and Donna Fisher.

== May ==
Marion Scott

Personal details
- Born: July 18, 1935 (age 91) Berlin, Germany
- Height: 5 ft 6 in (168 cm)

Marion Scott, a German-born American model, was Playboy magazine's Playmate of the Month for the May 1956 issue. Her centerfold was photographed by Herman Leonard. She was the first foreign-born Playmate.

According to The Playmate Book, Scott emigrated to the U.S. along with her parents after World War II ended, and eventually became a fashion model, as well as a frequent cover girl for detective magazines.

== June ==
Gloria Walker

Personal details
- Born: July 16, 1937 (age 89) The Bronx, New York, U.S.
- Height: 5 ft 4 in (163 cm)

Gloria Walker (born July 16, 1937) was an American actress and model. She was Playboy magazine's Playmate of the Month for the June 1956 issue.

== July ==
Alice Denham

Personal details
- Born: January 21, 1927 Jacksonville, Florida, U.S.
- Died: January 27, 2016 (aged 89) Manhattan, New York, U.S.
- Height: 5 ft 2 in (157 cm)

Alice Denham (January 21, 1927 – January 27, 2016) was an American writer and model. She was Playboy magazine's Playmate of the Month for the July 1956 issue. Her centerfold was credited to Arthur-James and Mike Shea.

== August ==
Jonnie Nicely

Personal details
- Born: February 25, 1936 Fort Smith, Arkansas, U.S.
- Died: February 6, 2013 (aged 76) Lancaster, California, U.S.
- Height: 5 ft 7 in (170 cm)

Jonnie Nicely (February 25, 1936 – February 6, 2013) was an American model. She was Playboy magazine's Playmate of the Month for the August 1956 issue. Her centerfold was photographed by Hal Adams.

Nicely was originally supposed to be a Playmate for the October 1955 issue, but scheduling and creative conflicts temporarily pushed her aside in favor of Jean Moorhead. Before and after her Playboy appearance, Nicely did additional pin-up modeling, but eventually she went on to a long career as a mechanic at a Rockwell International B-1 bomber plant in California.

== September ==
Elsa Sørensen

Personal details
- Born: March 25, 1934 Copenhagen, Denmark
- Died: April 18, 2013 (aged 79) Florida, U.S.
- Height: 5 ft 6 in (168 cm)

Elsa Sørensen (March 25, 1934 – April 18, 2013) was a Danish model, and Miss Denmark, who did most of her work under the pseudonym Dane Arden. Under her real name, she was Playboy magazine's Playmate of the Month for the September 1956 issue.

Her centerfold was photographed by Peter Gowland. She was first married to Guy Mitchell but that marriage ended in divorce.

== October ==
Janet Pilgrim

Personal details
- Born: Charlaine Edith Karalus; June 13, 1934 Wheaton, Illinois, U.S.
- Died: May 1, 2017 (aged 82) Norwalk, Connecticut, U.S.
- Height: 5 ft 6 in (168 cm)

Janet Pilgrim (June 13, 1934 – May 1, 2017) was an American model and office worker for Playboy. She was chosen as Playboy's Playmate of the Month three times: July 1955, December 1955 and October 1956.

== November ==
Betty Blue

Personal details
- Born: August 14, 1931 West Memphis, Arkansas, U.S.
- Died: August 23, 2000 (aged 69)
- Height: 5 ft 3 in (160 cm)

Betty Blue (August 14, 1931 – August 23, 2000) was an American model and actress, and was Playboy magazine's Playmate of the Month for the November 1956 issue. Her centerfold was photographed by Hal Adams.

== December ==
Lisa Winters

Personal details
- Born: Marie Perry; May 18, 1936 (age 90) Pompano Beach, Florida, U.S.
- Height: 5 ft 2 in (157 cm)

Lisa Winters (born May 18, 1936, as Marie Perry in Pompano Beach, Florida) is an American model and actress. She is Playboy magazine's Playmate of the Month for its December 1956 issue and later named as the magazine's first Playmate of the Year for 1957. Winters would pose only for Yeager because she felt too shy to be naked in front of any male photographer.

She also worked as a secretary for Hugh Hefner in Chicago's Playboy offices. She starred in two films; her first film was with her Playboy photographer Bunny Yeager, and named Bunny Yeager's Nude Camera (1963); her second film, in which she starred under her real name, Marie Perry, was named Intimate Diary of Artists' Models. Both films are rated R for nudity.

== See also ==
- List of people in Playboy 1953–59

Lynn Turner	Marguerite Empey	Marian Stafford	Rusty Fisher	Marion Scott	Gloria Walker
Alice Denham	Jonnie Nicely	Elsa Sørensen	Janet Pilgrim	Betty Blue	Lisa Winters
