= List of Playboy Playmates of 2016 =

The following is a list of Playboy Playmates of 2016. Playboy magazine names their Playmate of the Month each month throughout the year.

In the March 2016 issue, playmates became "non nude", without any photographs of full frontal nudity. This decision was reversed in 2017.

== January ==
Amberleigh West

Personal details
- Born: September 4, 1991 (age 34) Sedro-Woolley, Washington, US
- Height: 5 ft 6 in (1.68 m)

Amberleigh Deann West is a model, actress and the Playboy Playmate of the Month for January 2016 and her pictorial was shot by Sasha Eisenman.

== February ==
Kristy Garett

Personal details
- Born: February 13, 1990 (age 36) Tbilisi, Georgia, Soviet Union
- Height: 5 ft 7 in (1.70 m)

Kristy Garett, born Kristy Goretskaya in Tbilisi, Georgian SSR, Soviet Union, is the Playboy Playmate of the Month for February 2016. Her pictorial was shot by Sasha Eisenman. She was the last Playboy Playmate to appear nude in the magazine publication (until March 2017 when Playboy decided to bring nudity back to the magazines).

== March ==
Dree Hemingway
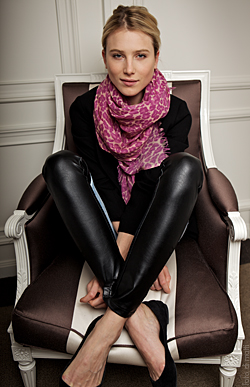
- Hemingway in 2009

Personal details
- Born: December 4, 1987 (age 38) Sun Valley, Idaho
- Height: 5 ft 9 in (1.75 m)

Dree Louise Hemingway is the Playboy Playmate of the Month for March 2016 and her pictorial was shot by Angelo Pennetta. She was the first Playboy Playmate not to appear nude in the magazine, after an editorial policy shift.

== April ==
Camille Rowe

Personal details
- Born: January 7, 1990 (age 36) Paris, France
- Height: 5 ft 7.5 in (1.71 m)

Camille Rowe is the Playboy Playmate of the Month for April 2016 and her pictorial was shot by Guy Aroch.

== May ==
Brook Power

Playboy Playmate of the Year
- 2017
- Preceded by: Eugena Washington
- Succeeded by: Nina Daniele

Personal details
- Born: September 14, 1994 (age 31) Inglewood, California
- Height: 5 ft 8 in (1.73 m)

Brook Ashley Power is the Playboy Playmate of the Month for May 2016 and her pictorial was shot by Aaron Feaver. Her Playmate of the year story was shot at the playboy mansion by David Bellemare just two months after giving birth to her oldest son. Brook is of Sicilian and Chippewa Indian descent. A model, and an actress who is a member of the Screen Actors Guild since 2008, Brook was raised in Hawaii on the island of Oahu. She currently models with multiple domestic and international modeling agencies and lives in Malibu California and Hawaii. and the Playmate of the Year 2017.

== June ==
Josie Canseco

Personal details
- Born: Josiphene Marie Canseco; November 5, 1996 (age 29) Weston, Florida
- Height: 5 ft 9 in (1.75 m)

Josiphene Marie Canseco is a model and the Playboy Playmate of the Month for June 2016 and her pictorial was shot by Henrik Purienne. She is a daughter of former Major League Baseball (MLB) outfielder and designated hitter Jose Canseco and former model Jessica Sekely. She auditioned for the Sports Illustrated Swimsuit Issue of 2016 prior to her pictorial with Playboy.

== July ==
Ali Michael

Personal details
- Born: May 15, 1990 (age 35) Colleyville, Texas
- Height: 5 ft 9 in (1.75 m)

Alexandra Nicole Michael is the Playboy Playmate of the Month for July 2016 and her pictorial was shot by Jason Lee Parry.

== August ==
Valerie van der Graaf

Personal details
- Born: 12 February 1992 (age 34) Rotterdam, South Holland, Netherlands
- Height: 5 ft 11 in (1.80 m)

Valerie van der Graaf is the Playboy Playmate of the Month for August 2016 and her pictorial was shot by David Bellemere. She also appeared in the Sports Illustrated Swimsuit Issue of 2014 prior to her pictorial with Playboy.

== September ==
Kelly Gale
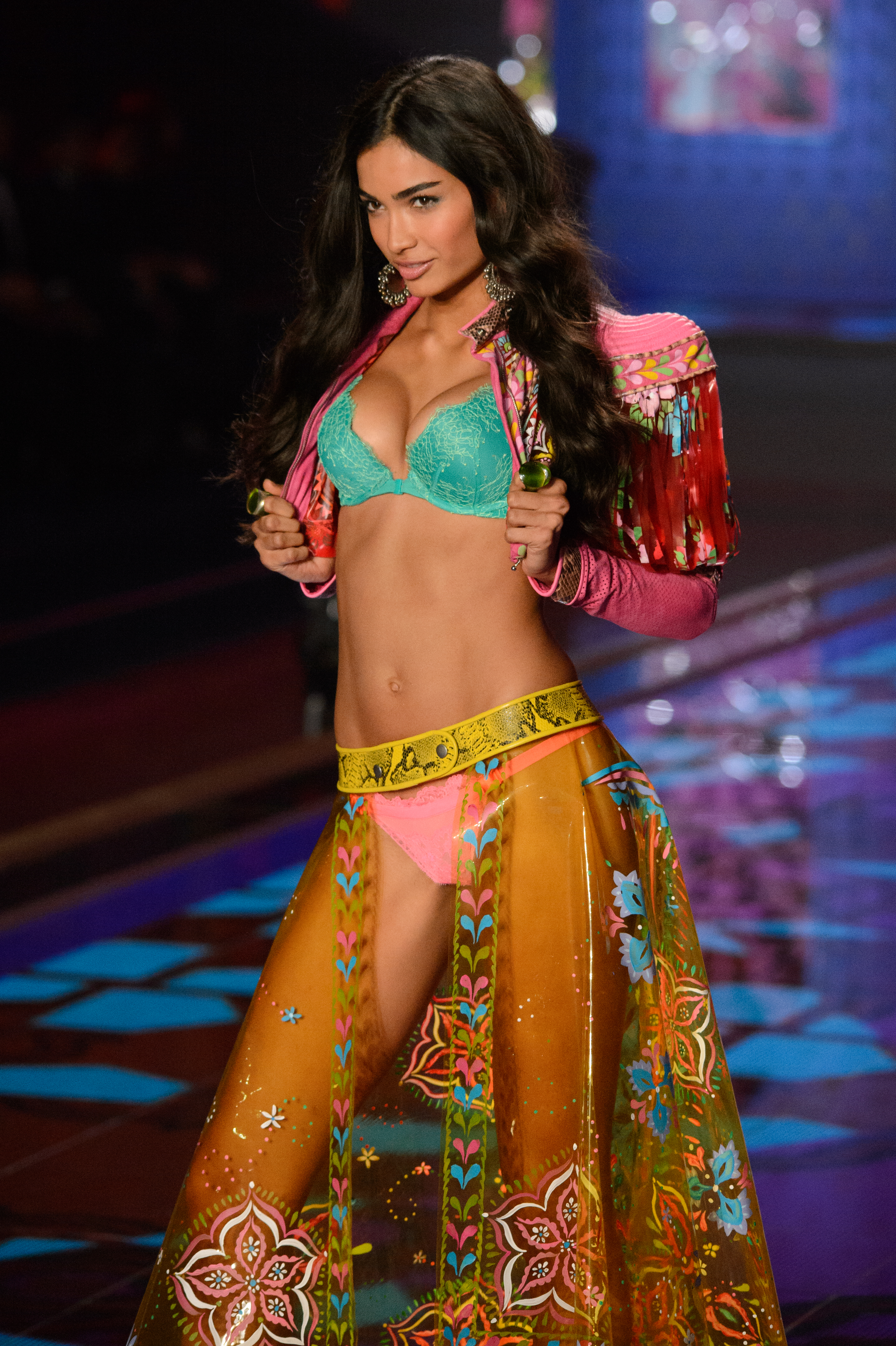
- Gale at the Victoria's Secret Fashion Show in London, December 2014

Personal details
- Born: 14 May 1995 (age 30) Gothenburg, Sweden
- Height: 5 ft 11 in (1.80 m)

Kelly Olivia Gale is a fashion model and the Playboy Playmate of the Month for September 2016 and her pictorial was shot by Chris Heads.

== October ==
Allie Silva

Personal details
- Born: November 29, 1988 (age 37) Willimantic, Connecticut
- Height: 5 ft 9 in (1.75 m)

Alexandra Katharine Silva (known professionally as Allie Silva) is a fashion model and the Playboy Playmate of the Month for October 2016 and her pictorial was shot by Henrik Purienne.

== November ==
Ashley Smith

Personal details
- Born: 26 November 1990 (age 35) California
- Height: 5 ft 9 in (1.75 m)

Ashley Bryanne Smith is a fashion model and the Playboy Playmate of the Month for November 2016 and her pictorial was shot by Zoey Grossman. She also appeared in the Sports Illustrated Swimsuit Issue of 2015 prior to her pictorial with Playboy.

== December ==
Enikő Mihalik
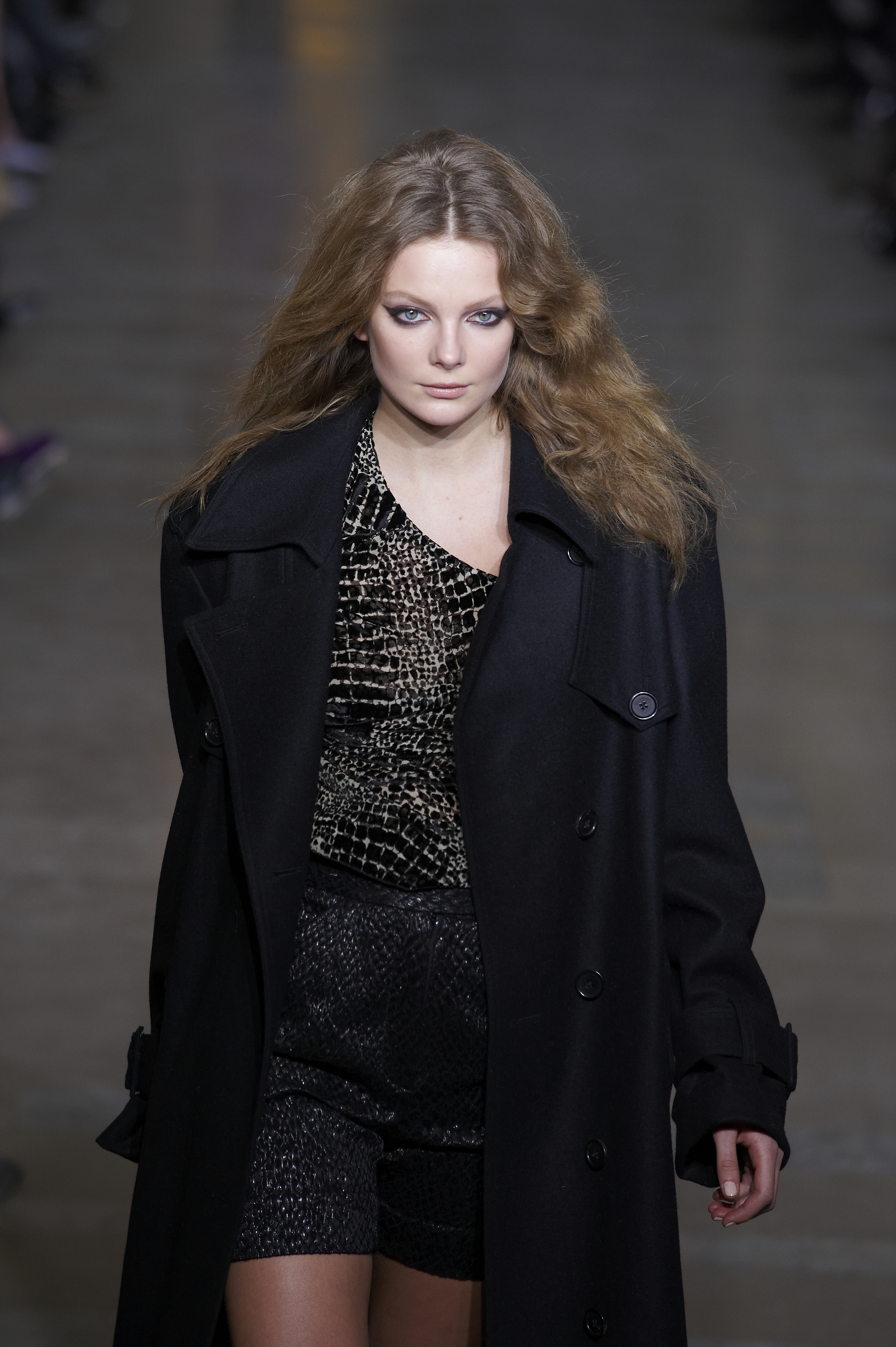
- Mihalik at the Jill Stuart show during the 2010 New York Fashion Week

Personal details
- Born: 11 May 1987 (age 38) Békéscsaba, Hungary
- Height: 179 cm (5 ft 10 1/2 in)

Enikő Eva Mihalik is a Hungarian fashion model and the Playboy Playmate of the Month for December 2016 and her pictorial was shot by David Bellemere.

== See also ==
- List of people in Playboy 2010–2019

Amberleigh West	Kristy Garett	Dree Hemingway	Camille Rowe	Brook Power	Josie Canseco
Ali Michael	Valerie van der Graaf	Kelly Gale	Allie Silva	Ashley Smith	Enikő Mihalik
