= Janet Pilgrim (model) =

American model (1934–2017)

Playboy centerfold appearance
- July 1955
- Preceded by: Eve Meyer
- Succeeded by: Pat Lawler

Personal details
- Born: Charlaine Edith Karalus; June 13, 1934 Wheaton, Illinois, U.S.
- Died: May 1, 2017 (aged 82) Norwalk, Connecticut, U.S.
- Height: 5 ft 6 in (168 cm)

Janet Pilgrim

Playboy centerfold appearance
- December 1955
- Preceded by: Barbara Cameron
- Succeeded by: Lynn Turner

Janet Pilgrim

Playboy centerfold appearance
- October 1956
- Preceded by: Elsa Sørensen
- Succeeded by: Betty Blue

Janet Pilgrim (born Charlaine Edith Karalus; June 13, 1934 – May 1, 2017) was an American model who became a Playmate of the Month while employed at Playboy's corporate office. She was chosen as Playmate of the Month three times: July 1955, December 1955 and October 1956.

== Miss July 1955 ==
In 1955, Playboy was in its second year of production and had previously used professional models as Playmates. Karalus worked for Hugh Hefner in the subscription department and agreed to pose for the July 1955 episode in exchange for a new addressograph for the office. Hefner reportedly chose the name "Janet Pilgrim" as to make fun of sexual puritanism.

Karalus appeared topless with a tuxedo-clad man reported to be Hefner in the background with his back to the camera. The caption read in part: "We found Miss July in our own circulation department, processing subscriptions, renewals, and back copy orders. Her name is Janet Pilgrim and she's as efficient as she is good looking."

== Response ==
Readers responded well to her appearance as Miss July and sent in letters asking for more Janet Pilgrim. Despite getting offers to model for outside agencies, Janet chose to appear twice more as a Playmate and was listed on Playboy's masthead as head of reader's services department for the next 10 years. Hefner at one point offered a personal phone call from Pilgrim in exchange for enrollment in a lifetime subscription to his magazine.

Pilgrim is said to be the prototype of the "girl next door" approach to Playboy Playmates from that time onward.

== Personal life ==
In the early 1980s she attended college to become a registered nurse and worked in geriatrics. She was the daughter of Gedeminis Karalus and Hulda Wittekind. She was predeceased by her husband Alan Whitelaw, her brothers George and Donald, and sister Carol. She is survived by her sister Marilyn Pajkos; her daughters Linda (Kerry) Smith, of New Canaan; and Lisa (Gary) Wehner, of Hartwick, NY. She had five grandchildren: Zachary and Rachel Smith, of New Canaan; and Christopher, Jennifer, and Samantha Wehner, of Hartwick, New York.

She died in Norwalk, Connecticut, at the age of 82.

== See also ==
- List of people in Playboy 1953–59

| Bettie Page | Jayne Mansfield | (no Playmate) | Marilyn Waltz | Marguerite Empey | Eve Meyer |
| Janet Pilgrim | Pat Lawler | Anne Fleming | Jean Moorhead | Barbara Cameron | Janet Pilgrim |

| Lynn Turner | Marguerite Empey | Marian Stafford | Rusty Fisher | Marion Scott | Gloria Walker |
| Alice Denham | Jonnie Nicely | Elsa Sørensen | Janet Pilgrim | Betty Blue | Lisa Winters |
