= List of Playboy Playmates of 2017 =

The following is a list of Playboy Playmates of 2017. Playboy magazine names their Playmate of the Month each month throughout the year.

The decision in 2016 to stop showing playmates with full frontal nudity (who Pamela Anderson graced the final nude cover for) was reversed in the March/April 2017 issue.

== January ==
Bridget Malcolm

Personal details
- Born: 20 November 1991 (age 34) Perth, Australia

Bridget Malcolm is an Australian model and the Playboy Playmate of the Month for January 2017 and her pictorial was shot by Jason Lee Parry.

== February ==
Joy Corrigan

Personal details
- Born: 16 January 1995 (age 31) Raleigh, North Carolina, USA

Joy Elizabeth Corrigan is an American model and the Playboy Playmate of the Month for February 2017.

== March ==
Elizabeth Elam

Personal details
- Born: 5 August 1991 (age 35) Dallas, Texas

Elizabeth Victoria Elam is a model and the Playboy Playmate of the month for March 2017.

== April ==
Nina Daniele

Playboy Playmate of the Year
- 2018
- Preceded by: Brook Power
- Succeeded by: Jordan Emanuel

Personal details
- Born: 27 December 1988 (age 37) Pelham, New York, USA

Nina Marie Daniele is an American model and the Playboy Playmate of the Month for April 2017. She would eventually be named Playboy Playmate of the Year. She is now a UFC personality, a sports reporter and has a YouTube channel where she goes by the name of Nina Drama.

== May ==
Lada Kravchenko

Personal details
- Born: 28 November 1992 (age 33) Moscow, Russia

Lada Kravchenko is the Playboy Playmate of the Month for May 2017.

== June ==
Elsie Hewitt

Personal details
- Born: 5 March 1996 (age 30) London, UK

Elsie Rose Hewitt is the Playboy Playmate of Month for June 2017.

== July ==
Dana Taylor

Personal details
- Born: 2 June 1993 (age 33) Chicago, Illinois

Dana Taylor is the Playboy Playmate of Month for July 2017.

== August ==
Liza Kei

Personal details
- Born: 8 August 1990 (age 36) Rostov-on-Don, Russia
- Height: 5 ft 8 in (173 cm)

Liza Kei is the Playboy Playmate of Month for August 2017. She first appeared in the magazine on the cover of the March 2013 issue.

== September ==
Jessica Wall

Personal details
- Born: 25 June 1996 (age 30) Chicago, Illinois, United States

Jessica Wall is the Playboy Playmate of Month for September 2017. She is not the last playmate chosen by Hugh Hefner like some articles may suggest, as he stepped down from the company in late 2016 and his son, Cooper Hefner, briefly succeeded him before Hugh's death in 2017.

== October ==
Milan Dixon

Personal details
- Born: 5 October 1989 (age 37) Las Vegas, Nevada, United States

Milan Dixon is the Playboy Playmate of Month for October 2017.

== November ==
Ines Rau
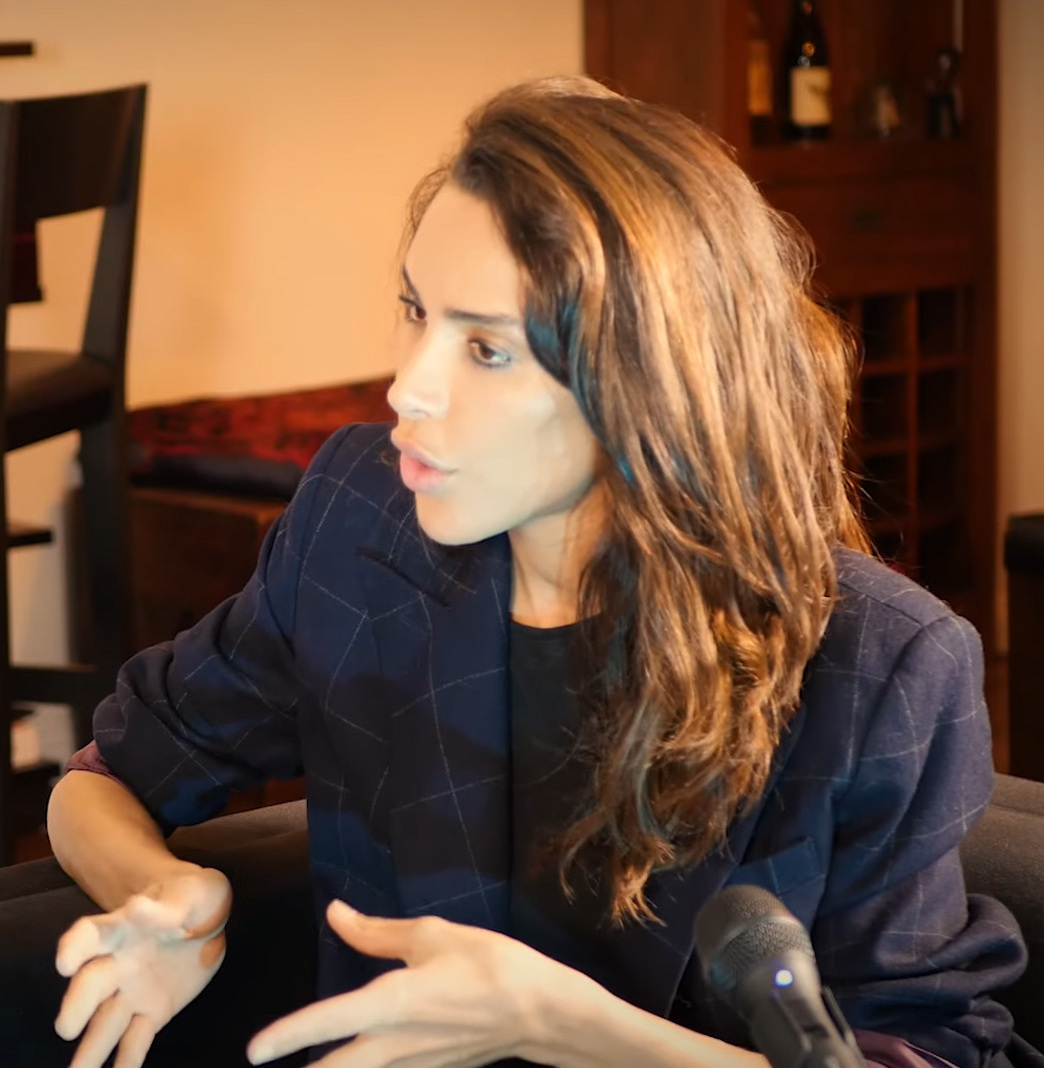
- Ines Rau in 2019

Personal details
- Born: 18 March 1990 (age 36) Paris, France

Ines Rau is the Playboy Playmate of the Month for November 2017. She is the first transgender Playmate and the second transgender model to appear in the magazine, as Caroline Cossey was featured in the September 1991 issue.

== December ==
Allie Leggett

Personal details
- Born: 12 January 1994 (age 32) McCreary County, Kentucky

Allie Leggett is the Playboy Playmate of the Month for December 2017.

== See also ==
- List of people in Playboy 2010–2019
