= Tamara Sky =

Puerto Rican disk jockey and model (born 1985)

Playboy centerfold appearance
- August 2007
- Preceded by: Tiffany Selby
- Succeeded by: Patrice Hollis

Personal details
- Born: Tamara Sky; February 20, 1985 (age 40); San Juan, Puerto Rico
- Height: 5 ft 6 in (1.68 m)
- Official website

Tamara Sky (born February 20, 1985) is a Puerto Rican professional disc jockey and model.

== Career ==
Sky was born in San Juan, Puerto Rico. She has been Miss Puerto Rico Bikini.

She was the cover celebrity and centerfold for the April 2006 issue of the Mexican edition of Playboy. Then she was named Playmate of the Month for August 2007 for the American edition of the magazine. She was the only Playmate in 2007 to have any pubic hair for her photoshoot.

She was the main DJ for Donald Trump's birthday party at the Trump Taj Mahal in Atlantic City in June 2007 hosted by Carmen Electra. She has DJ'd the Pamela Anderson hosted Mac Cosmetics Fashion Week launch party in New York and the after party for the J-lo and Marc Anthony concert. She has appeared on E!'s reality TV show The Girls Next Door, in Miami based magazine Ocean Drive, online dance music magazine Maxumi and as the front-page feature in New York's Missbehave magazine.

== Filmography ==
Year	Title	Role
2007	The Girls Next Door	herself
2017	Sex.Sound.Silence	Lexi Sandoval

Jayde Nicole	Heather Rene Smith	Tyran Richard	Giuliana Marino	Shannon James	Brittany Binger
Tiffany Selby	Tamara Sky	Patrice Hollis	Spencer Scott	Lindsay Wagner	Sasckya Porto
