= List of Playboy Playmates of 1958 =

The following is a list of Playboy Playmates of 1958. Playboy magazine names its Playmate of the Month each month throughout the year.

== January ==
Elizabeth Ann Roberts

Personal details
- Born: August 4, 1941 (age 84) Chicago, Illinois, U.S.

Elizabeth Ann Roberts (born August 4, 1941) is an American model. She was Playboy magazine's Playmate of the Month for the January 1958 issue. Her centerfold was photographed by Arthur James and Mike Shea, when she was 16.

== February ==
Cheryl Kubert

Personal details
- Born: March 11, 1938 Los Angeles, California, U.S.
- Died: May 28, 1988 (aged 50) Los Angeles, California, U.S.

Cheryl Kubert (March 11, 1938 – May 28, 1988) was an American model. She had a bit part in the 1957 film Pal Joey, and was Playboy magazine's Playmate of the Month for the February 1958 issue. Her centerfold was photographed by Mario Casilli. She died at the age of 50, an apparent suicide.

== March ==
Zahra Norbo

Personal details
- Born: February 7, 1934 (age 92) Sweden
- Height: 5 ft 7 in (170 cm)

Zahra Norbo (born February 7, 1934) is a Swedish model. She was Playboy magazine's Playmate of the Month for the March 1958 issue. Her centerfold was photographed by Tom Caffrey. Norbo was Miss Sweden 1956 and a popular pin-up model in men's magazines.

== April ==
Felicia Atkins

Personal details
- Born: April 5, 1937 Australia
- Died: December 8, 2016 (aged 79) NSW, Australia
- Height: 5 ft 7.5 in (171 cm)

Felicia Atkins (born April 5, 1937 – December 8, 2016) was an Australian model. She was Playboy magazine's Playmate of the Month for the April 1958 issue. Her centerfold was photographed by Bruno Bernard and Bill Bridges.

== May ==
Lari Laine
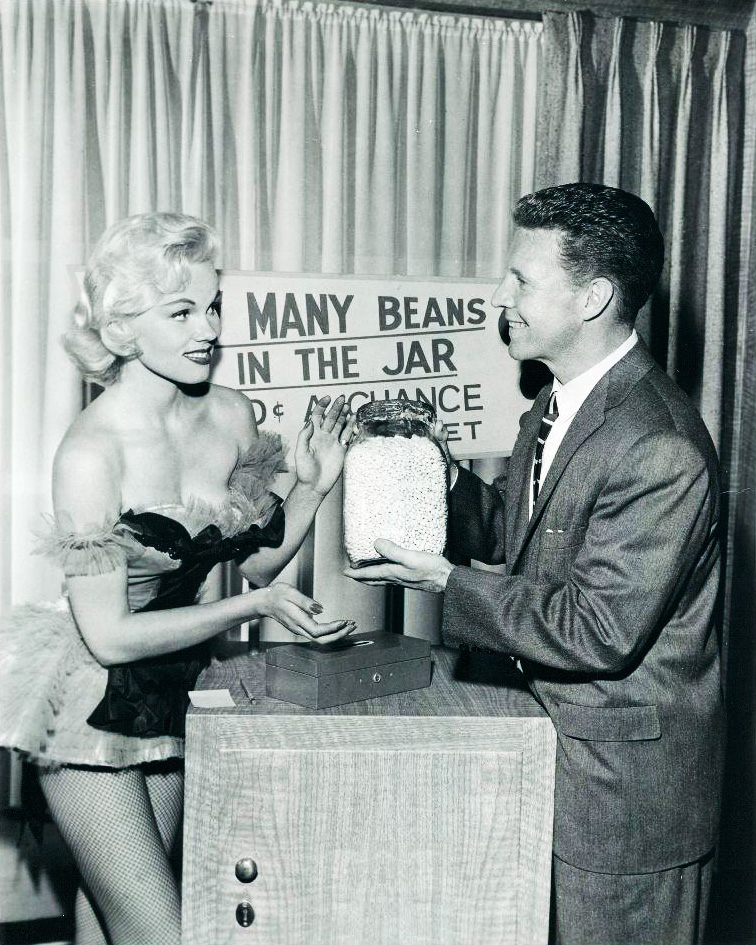
- Laine with Ozzie Nelson, 1958

Personal details
- Born: April 13, 1937 (age 89) Brentwood, California, U.S.
- Height: 5 ft 9 in (175 cm)

Lari Laine, a pseudonym used by Corrine Cole (born April 13, 1937), is an American model and actress She was Playboy magazine's Playmate of the Month for the May 1958 issue. Her centerfold was photographed by Ron Vogel.

== June ==
Judy Lee Tomerlin

Personal details
- Born: June 18, 1939 Nashville, Tennessee, U.S.
- Died: May 24, 2008 (aged 68) Florida, U.S.
- Height: 5 ft 5 in (165 cm)

Judy Lee Tomerlin (June 18, 1939 – May 24, 2008) was an American model. She is best known for being Playboy magazine's Playmate of the Month for its June 1958 issue. Her centerfold was photographed by Edward Oppman.

== July ==
Linné Ahlstrand

Personal details
- Born: July 1, 1936 Chicago, Illinois, U.S.
- Died: January 18, 1967 (aged 30) Pasadena, California, U.S.
- Height: 5 ft 2 in (157 cm)

Linné Nanette Ahlstrand (July 1, 1936 – January 18, 1967) was an American model and actress. She was Playboy magazine's Playmate of the Month for its July 1958 issue. Her centerfold was photographed by Frank Bez.

== August ==
Myrna Weber

Personal details
- Born: April 22, 1938 Florida, U.S.
- Died: July 21, 1999 (aged 61)

Myrna Weber (born April 22, 1938 – July 21, 1999) is an American model. She is Playboy magazine's Playmate of the Month for its August 1958 issue. Her centerfold was photographed by Bunny Yeager.

== September ==
Teri Hope

Personal details
- Born: Natalie Hope Reisberg; February 19, 1938 Kittanning, Pennsylvania, U.S.
- Died: September 26, 2023 (aged 85) Albuquerque, New Mexico, U.S.
- Height: 5 ft 2 in (157 cm)

Teri Hope (born Natalie Hope Reisberg; February 19, 1938 – September 26, 2023) was an American model and actress She was Playboy magazine's Playmate of the Month for the September 1958 issue. Her centerfold was photographed by Don Bronstein and Mike Shea. Hope later married Jay Redack and ultimately died in Albuquerque, New Mexico on September 26, 2023, at the age of 85.

== October ==
Mara Corday
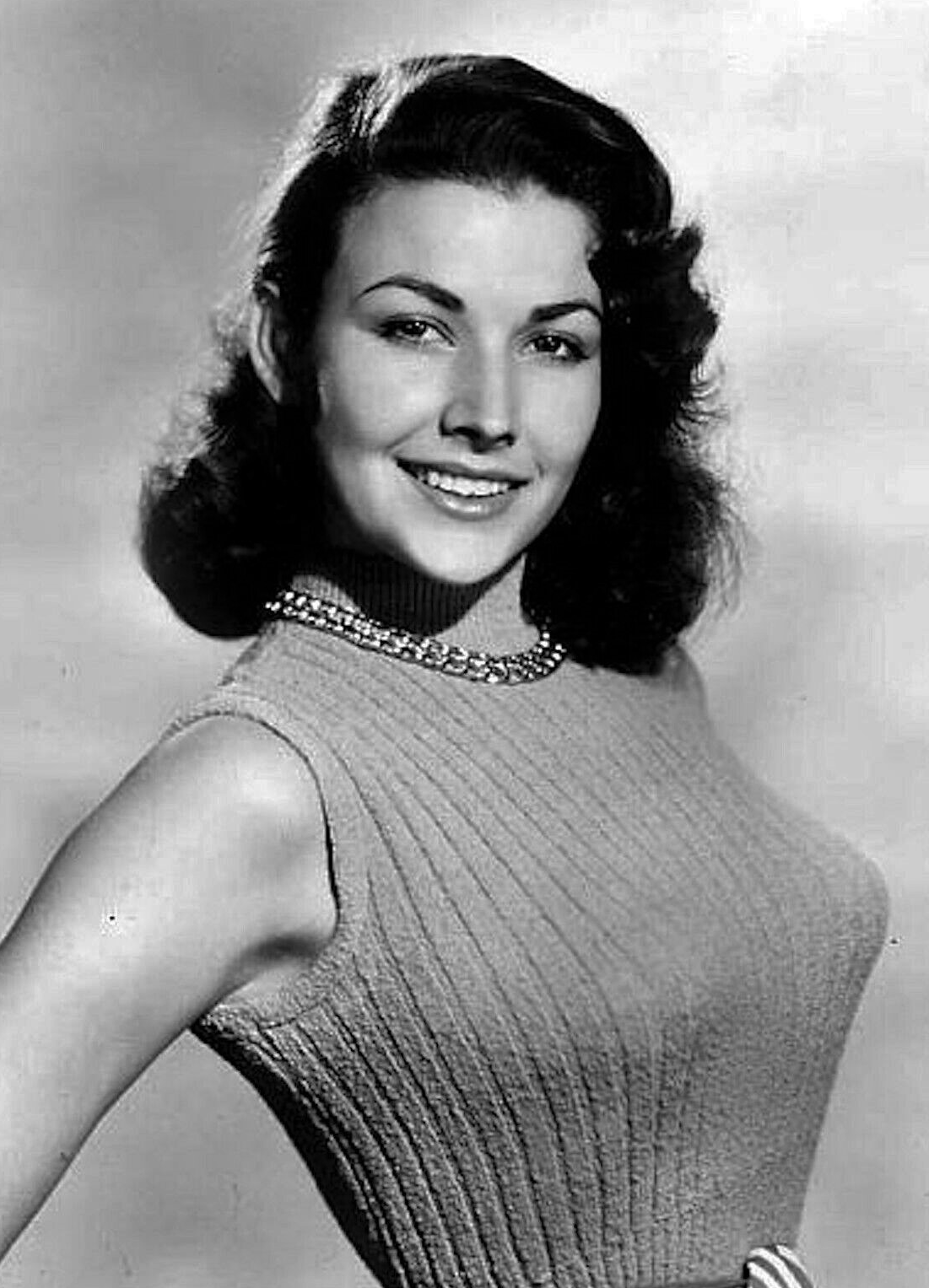

Personal details
- Born: Marilyn Joan Watts; January 3, 1930 Santa Monica, California, U.S.
- Died: February 9, 2025 (aged 95) Santa Clarita, California, U.S.
- Height: 5 ft 5 in (165 cm)

Pat Sheehan

Personal details
- Born: September 7, 1931 San Francisco, California, U.S.
- Died: January 14, 2006 (aged 74) Beverly Hills, California, U.S.
- Height: 5 ft 6 in (168 cm)

Mara Corday (Marilyn Joan Watts; January 3, 1930 – February 9, 2025) and Patricia Ann Sheehan, also known as Patricia Sheehan Crosby (September 7, 1931 – January 14, 2006) were the Playboy Playmates of the Month for October 1958.

== November ==
Joan Staley
- Staley in Broadside, 1964

Personal details
- Born: Joan Lynette McConchie; May 20, 1940 Minneapolis, Minnesota, U.S.
- Died: November 24, 2019 (aged 79) Valencia, California, U.S.
- Height: 5 ft 5 in (165 cm)

Joan Staley (born Joan Lynette McConchie; May 20, 1940 – November 24, 2019) was an American actress and model. She is perhaps best known for being Playboy magazine's Playmate of the Month for its November 1958 issue. Her centerfold was photographed by Lawrence Schiller and Ron Vogel. According to The Playmate Book, she was pregnant at the time of her Playmate shoot.

== December ==
Joyce Nizzari

Personal details
- Born: May 20, 1940 (age 86) The Bronx, New York, U.S.
- Height: 5 ft 6 in (168 cm)

Joyce Nizzari (born May 20, 1940) is an American model, dancer, and actress. She was Playboy magazine's Playmate of the Month for its December 1958 issue and later named both the 5-year Anniversary Playmate and Playmate of the Year for 1959. Her centerfold was photographed by Bunny Yeager.

Elizabeth Ann Roberts	Cheryl Kubert	Zahra Norbo	Felicia Atkins	Lari Laine	Judy Lee Tomerlin
Linné Ahlstrand	Myrna Weber	Teri Hope	Mara Corday, Pat Sheehan	Joan Staley	Joyce Nizzari
