= List of Playboy Playmates of 1960 =

The following is a list of Playboy Playmates of 1960. Playboy magazine names its Playmate of the Month each month throughout the year.

== January ==
Stella Stevens
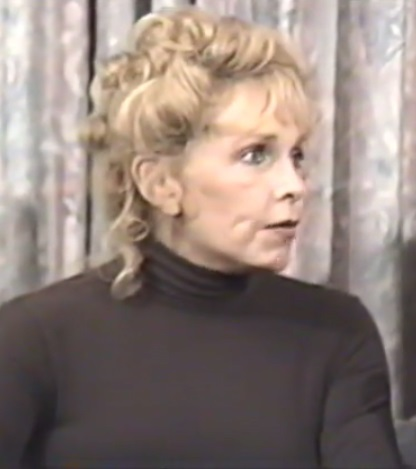
- Stevens in 1976

Personal details
- Born: Estelle Caro Eggleston; October 1, 1938 Yazoo City, Mississippi, U.S.
- Died: February 17, 2023 (aged 84) Los Angeles, California, U.S.
- Height: 5 ft 5 in (165 cm)

Stella Stevens (born Estelle Caro Eggleston; October 1, 1938 – February 17, 2023) was an American film, television and stage actress, who began her acting career in 1959. She was a film producer, director and pin-up girl. In 1960, Stevens was Playboy magazine's Playmate of the Month for January (and had featured pictorials in 1965 and 1968). Her centerfold was photographed by Frank Schallwig and Don Ornitz.

== February ==
Susie Scott

Personal details
- Born: August 22, 1938 Chicago, Illinois, U.S.
- Died: June 16, 2009 (aged 70)
- Height: 5 ft 7 in (170 cm)

Susie Scott (August 22, 1938 – June 16, 2009) was Playboy magazine's Playmate of the Month for the February 1960 issue. Her centerfold was photographed by Mario Casilli. She left the Playboy scene to give birth to her only son, Christopher, worked as a legal secretary and administrative assistance for the March of Dimes charity, and co-founded a local art gallery.Scott died of lung cancer on June 16, 2009, at the age of 70.

== March ==
Sally Sarell

Personal details
- Born: Sally Christine Sarell; June 25, 1938 Ashtabula, Ohio, U.S.
- Died: May 1, 1991 (aged 52)
- Height: 5 ft 8 in (173 cm)

Sally Sarell (June 25, 1938 – May 1, 1991) was Playboy magazine's Playmate of the Month for the March 1960 issue. Her centerfold was photographed by Louis Capuccine. She attended Ohio State University. Sarell died on May 1, 1991, at the age of 52.

== April ==
Linda Gamble

Playboy Playmate of the Year
- 1961
- Preceded by: Ellen Stratton
- Succeeded by: Christa Speck

Personal details
- Born: September 11, 1939 (age 87) Pittsburgh, Pennsylvania, U.S.
- Height: 5 ft 4 in (163 cm)

Linda Gamble (born September 11, 1939) is an American model. She was Playboy magazine's Playmate of the Month for April 1960. Her centerfold was photographed by Mario Casilli. She was also the 1961 Playmate of the Year.

== May ==
Ginger Young

Personal details
- Born: March 11, 1939 (age 87)
- Height: 5 ft 5 in (165 cm)

Ginger Young (born March 11, 1939) is an American model and actress who was Playboy magazine's Playmate of the Month for its May 1960 issue. Her centerfold was photographed by Frank Bez.

== June ==
Delores Wells
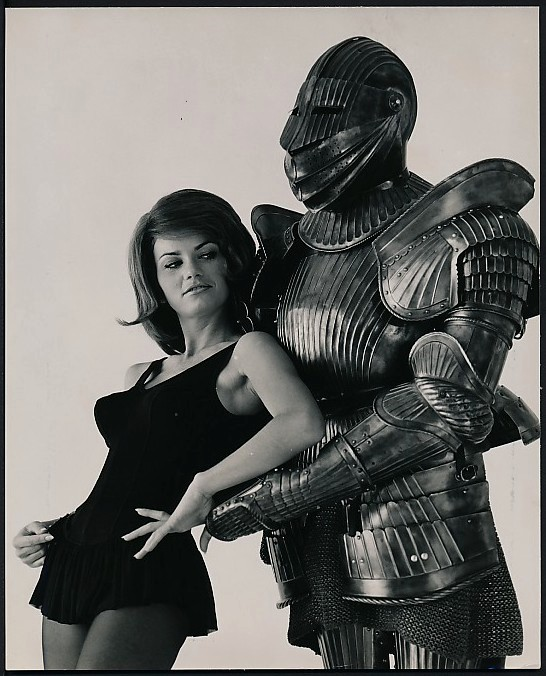

Personal details
- Born: Delores Marie Wells; October 17, 1937 Reading, Pennsylvania, U.S.
- Died: February 9, 2016 (aged 78) Phoenix, Arizona, U.S.
- Height: 5 ft 2 in (157 cm)

Delores Marie Wells (October 17, 1937 – February 9, 2016) was an American model and actress. She was Playboy magazine's Playmate of the Month for its June 1960 issue. Her centerfold was photographed by Don Bronstein.

== July ==
Teddi Smith

Personal details
- Born: Delilah Henry; September 21, 1942 (age 84) Hastings, Nebraska, U.S.
- Height: 5 ft 5 in (165 cm)

Teddi Smith (born Delilah Henry; September 21, 1942) is an American model. She was Playboy magazine's Playmate of the Month for the July 1960 issue. Her centerfold was photographed by William Graham and Edmund Leja. After becoming a Playmate, she was a Bunny at the Chicago Playboy Club. Smith appeared on the cover of Playboy five times during the early to mid-1960s.

== August ==
Elaine Paul

Personal details
- Born: August 11, 1938 (age 88)
- Height: 5 ft 4 in (163 cm)

Elaine Paul (born August 11, 1938) is an American model. She was Playboy magazine's Playmate of the Month for its August 1960 issue. Her centerfold was photographed by Frank Eck.

== September ==
Ann Davis

Personal details
- Born: June 17, 1938 (age 88)
- Height: 5 ft 2 in (157 cm)

Ann Davis (born June 17, 1938) is an American model. She was Playboy magazine's Playmate of the Month for its September 1960 issue. Her centerfold was photographed by Don Bronstein. Playboy also had several prominent artists, including LeRoy Neiman, produce their own illustrations of Davis for her pictorial.

== October ==
Kathy Douglas

Personal details
- Born: May 23, 1942 (age 84)
- Height: 5 ft 5 in (165 cm)

Kathy Douglas (born May 23, 1942) is an American model. She was Playboy magazine's Playmate of the Month for its October 1960 issue. Her centerfold was photographed by Mario Casilli.

== November ==
Joni Mattis

Personal details
- Born: Joan E. Mattis; November 28, 1938 Chicago, Illinois, U.S.
- Died: September 4, 1999 (aged 60) Los Angeles, California, U.S.
- Height: 5 ft 2 in (157 cm)

Joni Mattis (born Joan E. Mattis; November 28, 1938 – September 4, 1999) was an American model. She was Playboy magazine's Playmate of the Month for its November 1960 issue. Her centerfold was photographed by Jerry White.

Joni Mattis was a young housewife and mother in a troubled marriage when Hugh Hefner helped turn her life around. Ms. Mattis, a longtime friend, personal secretary and assistant to the Playboy magazine founder, who started her career with him in Chicago and eventually became a romantic interest of Hefner. Hefner said she was in an unhappy marriage and eventually divorced.

Mattis died of cancer in Los Angeles, California, at the age of 60.

== December ==
Carol Eden

Personal details
- Born: May 19, 1942 (age 84) Hollywood, California, U.S.
- Height: 5 ft 6 in (168 cm)

Carol Eden (born May 19, 1942) is an American model. She was Playboy magazine's Playmate of the Month for its December 1960 issue. Her centerfold was photographed by William Graham. Eden's daughter Simone was the Playmate of the Month for February 1989; they thus became the first mother-daughter combination to both become Playboy Playmates.

== See also ==
- List of people in Playboy 1960–69

Stella Stevens	Susie Scott	Sally Sarell	Linda Gamble	Ginger Young	Delores Wells
Teddi Smith	Elaine Paul	Ann Davis	Kathy Douglas	Joni Mattis	Carol Eden
