= Peter Gowland =

American glamour photographer and actor (1916–2010)

- Born: Peter Andrew Gowland; April 3, 1916; Los Angeles, California, United States
- Died: March 17, 2010 (aged 93); Pacific Palisades, California, United States
- Occupation: Glamour photographer
- Years active: 1936–1966
- Spouse: Alice Adams (m. 1941)
- Children: 2
- Parent(s): Gibson Gowland; Sylvia Andrew
- Military career
- Allegiance: United States
- Branch: Army of the United States
- Service years: 1942–1946
- Rank: Sergeant, Photographer
- Awards: WWII campaign, good conduct and service medals
- Website: http://petergowland.com

Peter Andrew Gowland (April 3, 1916 – March 17, 2010) was a famous American glamour photographer and actor. He was known for designing and building his own studio equipment and was active professionally for six decades with his business partner, Alice Beatrice Adams, whom he married in 1941.

== Career ==
Gowland shot more than 1,000 magazine covers, mostly glamour shots of female models like Mary Morlas, Joy Langstaff, and Barbara Osterman, but also portraits of celebrities including Rock Hudson and Robert Wagner. His covers included Rolling Stone, Playboy, and Modern Photography. He invented elite cameras and equipment that he used to shoot pinups and magazine covers. In the late 1950s, Gowland also invented the twin-lens Gowlandflex camera, which used 4-by-5 inch film for high-quality pictures. The camera has since been used by such photographers as Annie Leibovitz and Yousuf Karsh.

Gowland grew up on movie sets and worked as a film extra in his youth. He learned photo lighting and techniques from watching movies being shot. The son of Gibson Gowland and Sylvia Andrew, both actors, he acted in at least 12 films, mostly uncredited. He had a small part in Citizen Kane. He died of surgical complications after fracturing his hip.

== The Anatomical Basis of Medical Practice ==
The 1971 human anatomy textbook The Anatomical Basis of Medical Practice featured photographs by Gowland in the surface anatomy section. The book was authored by professors R. Frederick Becker, James S. W. Wilson, and John A. Gehweiler, and was met with scandal and a feminist boycott, which resulted in the withdrawal by the publisher after only 5000 copies were distributed.

== Bibliography ==
- Classic Nude Photography, ISBN 1-58428-040-9
- Peter Gowland's New Handbook of Glamour Photography, ISBN 0-517-56898-5
- The Secrets of Photographing Women
- Gowland's Guide to Glamour Photography
- How to Photograph Women 1954 Crown, 7 printings
- Art & Technique of Stereo Photography 1954 Crown, LCCN 54-11184
- Stereo Photography 1954 Crown, LCCN 54-6642
- Figure Photography 1954 Fawcett, 600,000 sold
- How to Take Glamour Photos 1955 Fawcett
- Glamour Techniques 1958 Fawcett
- Photo Secrets 1958 Whitestone
- Glamour Camera 1959 Fawcett
- Face & Figure 1959 Fawcett
- How to Take Better Home Movies 1960 ARCO
- Guide to Electronic Flash 1960 Amphoto
- Photo Ideas 1961 Whitestone
- Peter Gowland Photographs the Figure 1962 Whitestone
- Camera in Hawaii 1963 Whitestone
- Camera in Japan 1964 Whitestone
- Figure Quarterly 1965 Development Corp
- Guide to Glamour Photography 1972 Crown, 16 printings
- Electronic Flash Simplified 1976 Amphoto, 7 printings
- Basic Glamour 1979 School of Modern Photography
- The Secrets of Photographing Women 1981 Crown, 6 printings
- New Handbook of Glamour Photography 1988 Crown - Random House
- Henry Miller Portfolio 18 unbound prints 2000 Roger Jackson Publisher
- Classic Nude Photography 2001 Amherst Media, Inc.

== Filmography ==
Year	Title	Role	Notes
1936	The Adventures of Frank Merriwell	Himself	
1936	The Great Ziegfeld	Dancer	Uncredited
1936	Cain and Mabel	Dancer	Uncredited
1936	Born to Dance	Dancer	Uncredited
1937	Hot Water	College Boy	Uncredited
1939	Wuthering Heights	Dancer	Uncredited
1941	Citizen Kane	Guest	Uncredited
1946	13 Rue Madeleine		Uncredited
1947	The Secret Life of Walter Mitty	R.A.F. Pilot	Uncredited
1948	Joan of Arc	Soldier	Uncredited
1949	You're My Everything	Leading Man	Uncredited
1966	The Swinger	Photographer	Uncredited, (final film role)
