= Emily Ratajkowski =

American model and actress (born 1991)

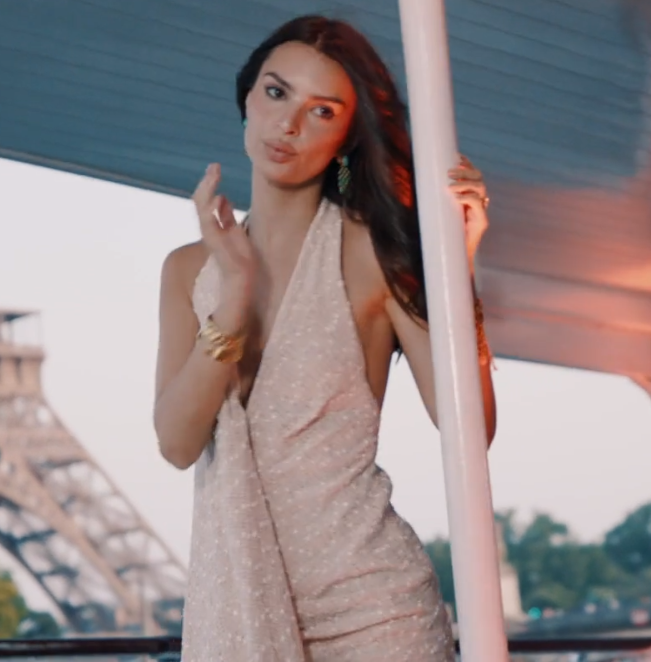
- Ratajkowski in 2021
- Born: Emily O'Hara Ratajkowski; June 7, 1991 (age 35); London, England
- Other name: EmRata
- Citizenship: United States
- Occupations: Model; actress
- Years active: 2004–present
- Spouse: Sebastian Bear-McClard (m. 2018; div. 2022)
- Children: 1
- Modeling information
- Height: 5 ft 7 in (1.70 m)
- Hair color: Brown
- Eye color: Brown
- Agency: DNA Model Management (New York); VIVA Model Management (Paris, London, Barcelona)

YouTube information
- Channel: Emily Ratajkowski
- Genre: Podcast
- Subscribers: 69 thousand
- Views: 5.43 million
- Last updated: June 13, 2026
- Website: emrata.com

Emily O'Hara Ratajkowski (/ˌrætəˈkaʊski/ RAT-ə-KOW-skee, Polish: [ratajˈkɔfskʲi]; born June 7, 1991), known occasionally as EmRata, is an American model and actress. Born in London to American parents and raised in Encinitas, California, she signed to Ford Models at a young age. Her modeling debut was on the cover of the March 2012 issue of the erotic magazine treats!, which led to her appearance in several music videos, including Robin Thicke's "Blurred Lines", which catapulted her to global fame.

Ratajkowski's feature film debut was a supporting role as the mistress of Ben Affleck's character in the film Gone Girl (2014). She appeared in the 2014 and 2015 Sports Illustrated swimsuit issues, and made her professional catwalk modeling debut for Marc Jacobs at New York Fashion Week in 2015. She has also walked on the runways of Paris Fashion Week and Milan Fashion Week. For her international Vogue covers and high fashion campaigns, Models.com ranks her as one of the new generation of supermodels.

Ratajkowski is an advocate for women's health issues as a spokesperson for Planned Parenthood. As a self-identified feminist, Ratajkowski has received both support and criticism for her views on sexual expression. Her essay collection, My Body, was published by Metropolitan Books in November 2021 and was on the New York Times Bestseller list.

== Early life ==
Emily O'Hara Ratajkowski was born June 7, 1991 in Westminster, London, the only child of American school teachers Kathleen Anne Balgley and John David "J.D." Ratajkowski. She was raised in the San Diego suburb of Encinitas, California. She attended UCLA for a year before dropping out to model full-time. Her father was raised Roman Catholic, whereas her mother is Jewish. Ratajkowski has stated that she ethnically identifies herself as "Polish-Israeli", as her ancestors made aliyah from Eastern Europe. (Note: Her grandfather was born in what is now Belarus.) She also has Irish ancestry. She spent her summers during her youth in Bantry, County Cork, Ireland and Sant Joan, Mallorca, Spain where the family vacationed.

Ratajkowski tried soccer, acting, and ballet before modeling. She participated in a few local theater productions as a child and young teen. During her formative years, Ratajkowski was introduced to works of art by her father and to the photography of Helmut Newton and Herb Ritts, much of which featured the female figure. This exposure prepared her for nude work later in her career. She has said, "We have this culture of men, especially, watching pornography, but then offended by a classic nude portrait or photograph, and I've never felt that way." She was also influenced by third-wave feminism and works such as The Beauty Myth and Promiscuities by Naomi Wolf.

== Career ==
=== Early acting and music video performances ===
The March 2012 Issue 3 treats! cover featuring Ratajkowski is the image that led to her being cast in the video for "Blurred Lines".

With encouragement from an acting coach, Ratajkowski met and signed with a talent agent who contacted Ford Models. That same day, she signed with Ford at age 14 and went on to do teen print catalog modeling for Kohl's and Nordstrom. At 15, Ratajkowski began auditioning for Disney and iCarly roles, but she was often typecast as a bully or cheerleader and bigger roles did not materialize. She attended San Dieguito Academy, a high school in Encinitas, while modeling and acting in Los Angeles. After two nondescript movie roles, she appeared as Gibby's girlfriend, Tasha, in two episodes of the third season of Nickelodeon's iCarly (2009–2010). Her manager discouraged her from pursuing many acting engagements until she could be more selective.

Ratajkowski attended UCLA for one year in 2009, and dropped out, deciding to model full-time. She later said that she found the fine art education at the UCLA School of the Arts and Architecture arbitrary and in conflict with her artistic concepts, and that she did not enjoy going to fraternities. After campaigns and editorials with photographer Tony Duran, Ratajkowski began shooting more fashion editorials and posed for several early issues of the artistic erotica magazine treats!, including the cover of its third issue, in March 2012. She credits that cover for bringing her the two unsolicited, high-profile, music video roles. Ratajkowski later filmed commercials for Nikon and Carl's Jr., including multiple versions of a 2012 Carl's Jr. commercial with Sara Jean Underwood. She also did nude and clothed art modeling for magazines, including a May 2012 shoot with Jonathan Leder, as well as work for Frederick's of Hollywood; a 2012 holiday video and a 2011 Valentine's video in which Ratajkowski appeared for the company are among the most popular videos on the company's YouTube channel. Ratajkowski worked with photographer Tony Kelly for the March 2013 GQ Turkey cover.

Ratajkowski appeared in Robin Thicke, T.I., and Pharrell Williams's 2013 video, "Blurred Lines". Previously, Ratajkowski had been cast in two other music videos: "Fast Car" by Taio Cruz, which was released on November 5, 2012, and Maroon 5's "Love Somebody", which was released two months after "Blurred Lines". "Love Somebody", shot on January 16, and "Blurred Lines" were both produced in 2013. The video for "Love Somebody" was released on May 21, 2013. Directed by Rich Lee, it shows bare-chested Adam Levine using inverse green screen technology to rub paint onto Ratajkowski with his hands. As they touch, they reveal each other.

Thicke had seen Ratajkowski's treats! cover that The New York Times's Bee Shapiro described as "an artfully composed black-and-white photograph of Ms. Ratajkowski sitting completely nude with her knees tucked to her chest" and convinced director Diane Martel to cast her in the "Blurred Lines" music video. Martel felt that "she looked smart and stunningly beautiful" in the photo. Ratajkowski initially declined the role, fearing being classified as a music video model, but Martel persuaded her. The video was released on March 20, 2013. On March 28, Thicke posted an explicit version, with a topless Ratajkowski.

"Blurred Lines" was controversial: its video was called sexist for its perceived degradation of women, and some felt its lyrics promoted rape. Others disagreed, asserting that the lyrics supported female power and sexual freedom. Martel defended Ratajkowski's performance, saying: "it's very, very funny and subtly ridiculing." Ratajkowski did not think of the video as sexist and claimed that the producers, through the use of humor and sarcasm, "took something that on paper sounded really sexist and misogynistic and made it more interesting". She said that the song "gave me an opportunity to say the things that I felt about feminism today and about women in general in pop culture." Ratajkowski did not feel objectified and enjoyed performing in a sexual manner: The attention given to the nudity in the video, she said, shows that America has not advanced as far as it should have, and, she believes, society represses sexuality, which is bad for both sexes.

"Blurred Lines", and Ratajkowski's associated video performance, were prominent beyond the sociopolitical controversies. The song became the number-one song of 2013 on music charts in many countries, including Canada, Ireland, the Netherlands, New Zealand, and the United Kingdom. Although second on the year-end US Billboard Hot 100 chart, the song's twelve consecutive weeks at number one made it the longest-running number-one song of the decade until "Uptown Funk" spent fourteen consecutive weeks at number one in 2015. The song also remained in the news due to a copyright infringement lawsuit and appeal.

=== Breakthrough and rise to prominence ===
The "Blurred Lines" video garnered Ratajkowski notoriety, especially as a sex symbol. In October 2013, Esquire magazine named Ratajkowski "Woman of the Year", over online fan vote finalist Jennifer Lawrence. That December, Rolling Stone magazine listed her among its twenty hottest sex symbols. In February 2014, Sports Illustrated magazine named Ratajkowski as one of twelve 50th anniversary swimsuit issue rookies. In April, FHM ranked her the fourth sexiest woman in the world. Maxim magazine included Ratajkowski at number 62 on its 2014 Hot 100 list. AskMen ranked her the third most desirable woman of 2014.

Ratajkowski was on the July 2013 cover of CR Fashion Book, which included erotic scenes with Karlie Kloss and male models, photographed by Bruce Weber. On June 24, she appeared topless in the July 2014 American GQ cover story, photographed by Michael Thompson. A controversy ensued at retailer Lands' End, some of whose customers received the issue for free. Some customers objected to the racy images, forcing Lands' End CEO Edgar Huber to apologize.

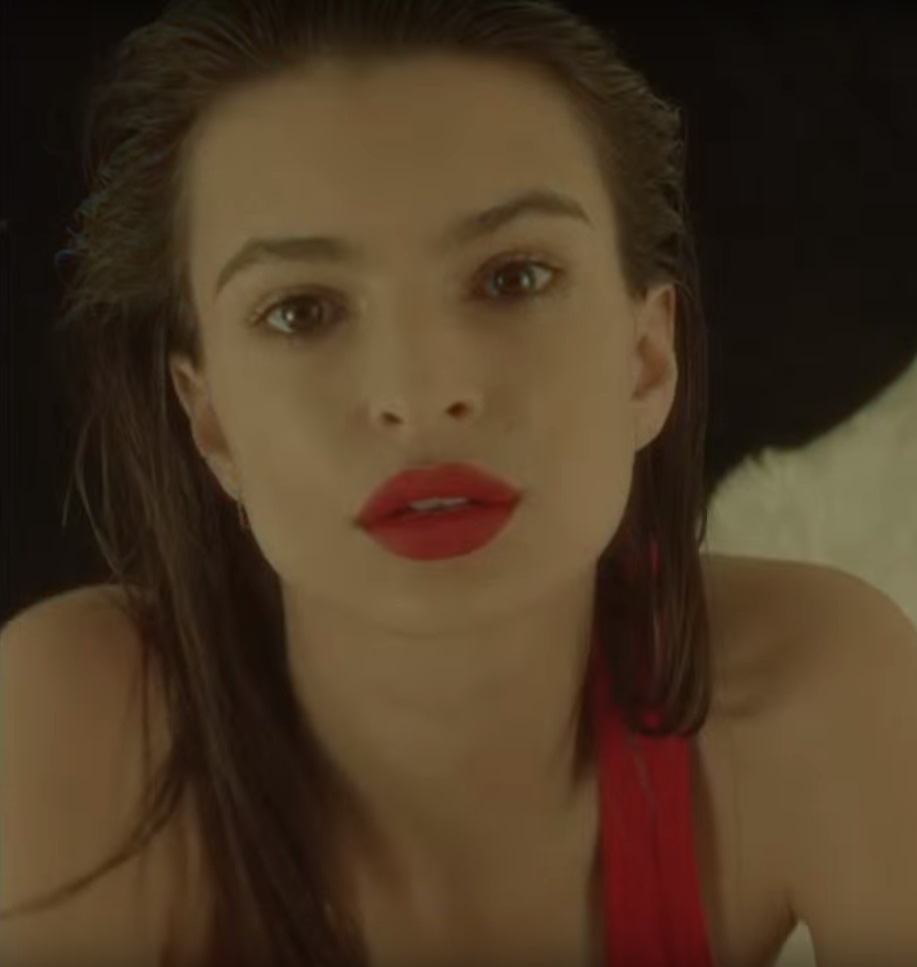
Ratajkowski photographed for Day 16 of LOVE's Advent 2014

Days after Gone Girl's September 26, 2014, New York Film Festival premiere, Ratajkowski became the cover model for the November 2014 issue of Cosmopolitan. On October 30, 2014, she appeared with Taylor Kitsch in the Call of Duty: Advanced Warfare live-action trailer. Ratajkowski appeared on the February 2015 FHM cover, but she tweeted that her picture was used without her consent. FHM responded that "we liked the pictures so much we stuck one on our front cover".

Ratajkowski co-starred in the 2015 film Entourage as a fictionalized version of herself, playing the love interest of Adrian Grenier's character, Vincent Chase. Her performance received critical commentary ranging from "less than compelling", by The Hollywood Reporter's Sheri Linden, to "uncanny realism", by The Philadelphia Inquirer's Steven Rea. Grantland's Morris described her role and performance with scathing sarcasm. She was also cast in the 2015 miniseries The Spoils Before Dying as Agent Day, appearing late in the series. Her performance was favorably reviewed by Emily L. Stephens of The A.V. Club, while other critics commented that she was part of a solid supporting cast.

Ratajkowski earned her first leading role, opposite Zac Efron, in We Are Your Friends, a musical drama released in August 2015, and was part of the film's promotional tour to Europe and North America. Starting with the August 11 London premiere, this tour marked her ascension as a style icon as she earned multiple best dressed citations from various sources. She played Stanford University dropout Sophie, the love interest of Efron's character and girlfriend/personal assistant of Wes Bentley's character. Her performance received mixed reviews. Alonso Duralde of TheWrap described the role as thin, as did Ty Burr of The Boston Globe. Burr said that Ratajkowski's performance was "surpassingly dull", while Nell Minow of Beliefnet stated that she "does more posing than acting". Jordan Hoffman of the Daily News described Ratajkowski's performance as "stunning and sweet". Robbie Collin of The Daily Telegraph and Grantland's Morris noted Ratajkowski's rhythmic dancing skills and sex appeal, as previously seen in "Blurred Lines".

Around the time of the release of We Are Your Friends, Ratajkowski appeared on the covers of Grazia France, British GQ, harper by Harper's Bazaar, InStyle UK, and InStyle Australia, as well as a role as a 2015 MTV Video Music Awards presenter. The British GQ cover story was photographed by Mario Testino, who produced a short film featuring Ratajkowski for the magazine's website. Soon after, on September 17, 2015, she made her runway debut for Marc Jacobs at the spring/summer 2016 New York Fashion Week finale. This appearance contributed to her number-one listing among Vogue's 12 Breakout Beauty Stars of 2015. For fall/winter 2016 fashions, Ratajkowski walked the Paris Fashion Week runway for Miu Miu on March 9, 2016. She has expressed the desire to break barriers for shorter and more curvaceous models, commenting: "You don't have to be 5'9" and an A-cup to be a successful model."

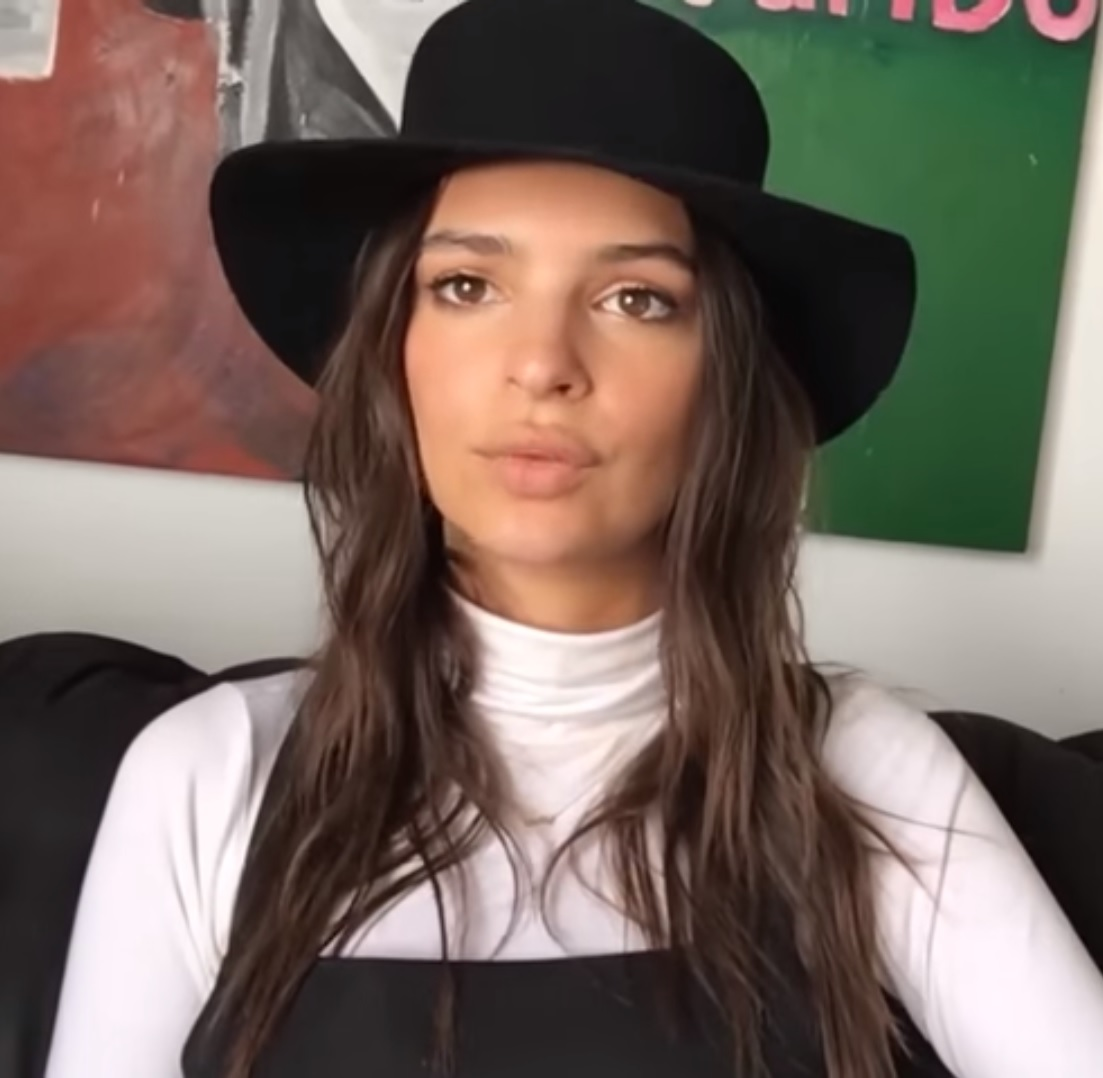
Ratajkowski in 2016

A Buick Super Bowl ad for its Cascada convertible during Super Bowl 50 on February 7, 2016, featured Ratajkowski and Odell Beckham Jr. The ad, in which she made a wedding bouquet catch reminiscent of Beckham's catch from 2014, received average ratings, according to USA Today's admeter. The ad was filmed with a stunt double making the catch. Los Angeles-based jewelry designer Jacquie Aiche featured Ratajkowski in a spring 2016 campaign wearing almost nothing but body chains, rings, bracelets, pendants, and chokers. In May, Ratajkowski appeared in the Russian-language music video "Inseparable" (Неделимые, sometimes translated as "Indivisible") with Russian entertainer Dima Bilan as a photographer and Ratajkowski as his muse.

=== Professional expansion ===
After seeing her in the "Blurred Lines" video Ben Affleck picked her to play the mistress of his character, in David Fincher's 2014 adaptation of Gillian Flynn's novel Gone Girl. The San Diego Union-Tribune described Ratajkowski's performance as "nuanced", while Andrew O'Hehir of Salon and Wesley Morris of Grantland wrote that her small role as a "duplicitous and manipulative former student" was critical. Reflecting on the performance in 2016, Naomi Wolf described Ratajkowski's portrayal as sympathetic and compassionate.

In August 2015, Warner Bros. Pictures released We Are Your Friends, in which Ratajkowski played Sophie. In their respective reviews of the film, critics Richard Roeper and Wesley Morris said that Ratajkowski, again playing the attractive object of affection, failed to demonstrate acting prowess. In February 2016, Ratajkowski was cast in the film In Darkness, alongside Natalie Dormer, Ed Skrein, and Stacy Martin. That August, she became the spokesperson for the Australian swimwear brand Amore + Sorvete.

Ratajkowski was one of five models to appear on the August 2016 Vogue Germany alternate covers along with Stella Maxwell, Irina Shayk, Lily Aldridge, and Rosie Huntington-Whiteley. Along with Joan Smalls and Kate Upton, Ratajkowski was one of three models for the October Glamour cover. The cover story, which was shot by Carter Smith and includes an essay by Ratajkowski, says she has become known as an activist who considers being both sexual and serious to be non-conflicting ambitions. She appeared in a season 1 episode of Joe Swanberg's Netflix series, Easy that was released on September 22, 2016. Her episode, in which she is a lifecasting selfie artist, met with mixed reviews. She was a guest judge on the October 20, Project Runway season 15 episode. By November 2016, Ratajkowski was attached to Lying and Stealing, which also starred Theo James.

Ratajkowski began 2017 on the February Vogue España cover shot by Miguel Reveriego. Ratajkowski also made cover appearances on the March issue of U.S. InStyle, and the May covers of American Marie Claire (with alternate covers by Janelle Monáe, Aja Naomi King, Zoey Deutch, Alexandra Daddario, et al.) and the French L'Officiel.

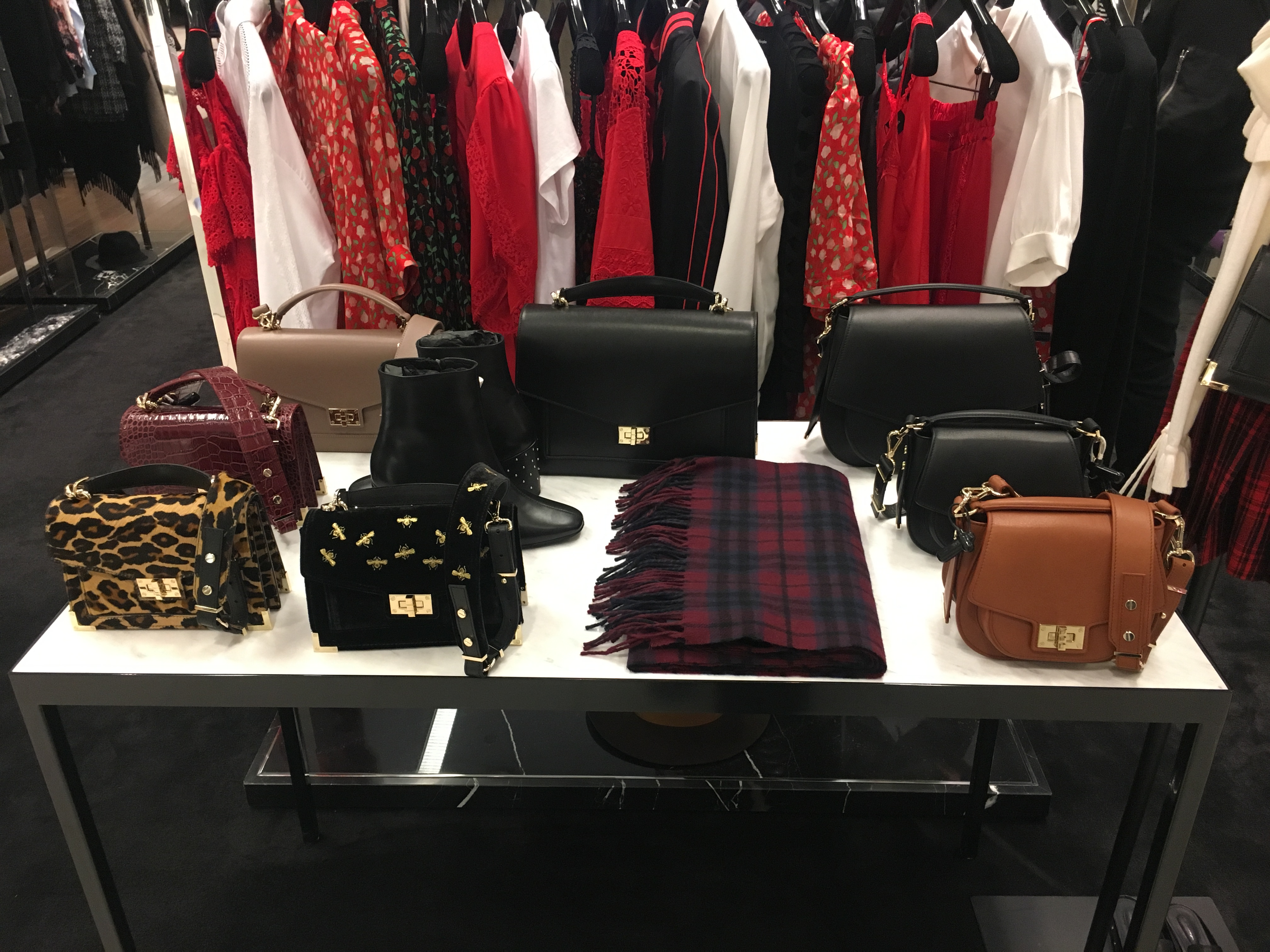
Bags designed by Ratajkowski for The Kooples on display at Bloomingdale's at 900 North Michigan

In March 2017, Ratajkowski became the face of DKNY intimates. On June 27, she was announced as the cover model for the August 2017 Australian Harper's Bazaar, which had different newsstand and subscriber covers photographed by Pamela Hanson. That July, after modeling for the French fashion brand The Kooples's Fall 2017 collection, Ratajkowski was enlisted to design a 38-piece bag collection for the company. The initial version of the collection, named Emily By The Kooples, comes in six colors and features a leather carryall bag, The Emily Bag. The bags are Italian-made and represent The Kooples' first foray into bags. Later that month she was announced as the feature of cover stories in the August issues of Allure and British Glamour, as well as a nude Patrick Demarchelier photospread for Love magazine.

That August she became the face of DL1961 jeans, The Frye Company for its Fall 2017 ad campaign, and the entire DKNY brand for its Fall 2017 campaign. On September 23, 2017, she walked the Milan Fashion Week runway for Bottega Veneta. Later that month, Ratajkowski revealed that she was working with a dialogue coach to learn the French and Italian languages for Lying and Stealing. On November 1, Tyga posted an unofficial 60-second video teaser for "Tequila Kisses", which featured Ratajkowski. As a result, Ratajkowski was noted as the starring performer in Tyga's "Tequila Kisses" bonus track music video. On November 4, Tyga removed the full video from various points of internet access including his own Instagram account, following complaints from Ratajkowski that the video was from a lookbook Ratajkowski did with Phillip Lopez in 2013. On November 9, Harper's Bazaar UK published a story about Ratajkowski's impending release of her own swimwear brand after Emrata Holdings LLC acquired the trademark to Inamorata in August and she left a trail of breadcrumbs on social media. Ratajkowski retweeted the story. The bathing suit line, Inamorata, went live on November 16, 2017, with three bikini separates and three one-pieces. In January 2018, Ratajkowski shot a fashion campaign with Inez and Vinoodh, as the new ambassador for Kérastase. British Vogue noted that the Kérastase endorsement was Ratajkowski's "first beauty campaign". That March, she landed her first fragrance campaign as the face of Paco Rabanne Parfum's women's line. That same month, she also earned the University of Southern California Inspire Award in at their inaugural ceremony. On April 8, 2018, Ratajkowski won the Model of the Year award from the Daily Front Row.

On March 29, 2018, she was cast as a series regular in the NBC pilot Bright Futures. The show was not included in NBC's 2018–19 schedule. The following month saw the release of the comedy film I Feel Pretty, in which Ratajkowski co-starred alongside Amy Schumer. Her role, which was described as "pivotal" by USA Today critic Bryan Alexander, included ad libbed improvisational comedy.

Ratajkowski was featured on the cover of the June 2018 issue of Marie Claire. She designed the mythology-themed "EmRata x Spinelli Kilcollin" jewelry collection with Spinelli Kilcollin that launched at Barneys New York on May 30, 2018, with prices starting at $6,000.

On September 21, 2018, Ratajkowski walked the Milan Fashion Week runway for Versace. That same weekend, she walked fashion week for Dolce & Gabbana. The following week, Vertical Entertainment released the film Cruise, which was written and directed by Robert Siegel, and in which Ratajkowski played the female lead opposite Spencer Boldman. That November, Ratajkowski appeared opposite Aaron Paul in Welcome Home.

External videos
- Discussion with Ratajkowski on My Body, November 16, 2021, C-SPAN

In November 2021 a collection of essays by Ratajkowski with title My Body was published. Quercus described it as "a deeply honest investigation of what it means to be a woman and a commodity". Cleveland Review of Books said the book turns "the tenuous power of a woman's body into a voluntary disturbance." A excerpt from the book leaked by the Sunday Times describes an incident during the 2013 filming of the music video for the song "Blurred Lines", in which Ratajkowski writes that Robin Thicke, the singer and star of the video, groped her breasts without her consent. Ratajkowski was displeased at the leak, telling Extra, "What's frustrating is I didn't come out with it, it was leaked. It's been hard for me, I really like to have control over my image, and I wrote this book of essays to share the whole story and all sides of it. I feel like it just turns into a clickbait frenzy, and all of a sudden words like 'sexual assault' and 'allegations' are getting thrown around rather than people reading the actual essay, so, again, I'm just looking forward to when people will be able to hear things in my own words." (See Early acting and music video performances section above for more details on this incident.)

In October 2022, Ratajkowski partnered with Sony Music Entertainment to launch a podcast entitled "High Low with EmRata". In January 2023, Ratajkowski became the face of Versace's Spring/Summer 2023 campaign. In September 2025, Ratajkowski partnered with Lounge (company) to launch their AW25 campaign.

Following an unsuccessful audition for Triangle of Sadness (2022), Ratajkowski quit acting. She explained that she fired her team, including her agents and manager, because she "didn't trust them". She also said "Hollywood is so fucked up" and she "felt like a piece of meat who people were judging, saying, 'Does she have anything else other than her [breasts]?'" Despite this, in 2024, she joined Too Much, a series created by Lena Dunham.

== In the media ==
Ratajkowski has been frequently named in lists and polls that rank beauty or fashion in the media. She was ranked in Maxim's Hot 100 list in both 2014 (No. 62) and 2015 (No. 2). AskMen ranked her among its most desirable women of 2014 (No. 3) and 2016 (No. 14); while FHM ranked her among the sexiest in 2014 (No. 4), and 2015 (No. 18). She is also praised for her fashion sense: Ratajkowski made Vogue Italia's Best Dressed List of 2015, and Harper's Bazaar placed her atop its best dressed list at the February 2016 New York Fashion Week.

In October 2017, American Vogue ran a feature article celebrating her "stylistic excellence".

In May 2025, Ratajkowski was featured in The New Yorker's ‘Power Houses: Inside the Living Rooms of Notable New Yorkers’.

=== Publishing controversies ===
Ratajkowski was one of the victims of the 2014 celebrity nude photo leak, in which several nude pictures of her were leaked online.

In 2014, artist Richard Prince appropriated one of Ratajkowski's Instagram posts without her consent, and included the resulting painting in a show at the Gagosian Gallery in New York. Seven years later, Ratajkowski took a photograph of herself standing in front of the Prince painting, and created a non-fungible token (NFT) from it. The NFT sold at auction at Christie's for $175,000. "I hope to symbolically set a precedent for women and ownership online, one that allows for women to have ongoing authority over their image and to receive rightful compensation for its usage and distribution," Ratajkowski wrote on Twitter.

71 photographs taken by Jonathan Leder in May 2012 were being printed in a publication by Imperial Publishing and set for display in a New York art gallery in February 2017. On November 30, 2016, Ratajkowski tweeted that she was being featured in the photobook publication without her consent. New York noted that Ratajkowski had claimed that the pictures were intended for use in an artful magazine, while USA Today noted that she had hesitated to protest because she did not want to give Leder publicity. She elaborated on the circumstances of the 2012 photoshoot in an essay titled "Buying Myself Back: When Does a Model Own her Own Image?" for The Cut in September 2020, reiterating that she never gave consent for the photographs to be used beyond their initial publication in Darius magazine, and stating that Leder sexually assaulted her after the photoshoot.

In September 2017, Ratajkowski took issue with image editing done for the cover of the Madame Figaro issue included in the Saturday September 16 issue Le Figaro.

In October 2019, Ratajkowski was sued for posting a paparazzi image of herself to her Instagram. Robert O'Neil, the paparazzo who took the photo at issue, argued that Ratajkowski's posting of the photo constituted copyright infringement. Ratajkowski decided against settling the suit and challenged O'Neil's claim against her. In 2022, a settlement was reached and the terms were not disclosed.

=== Fyre Festival controversy ===
In 2017, Ratajkowski promoted that April's Fyre Festival on Instagram with Kendall Jenner, Bella Hadid, and other actresses and models. Ratajkowski was reportedly the only actress or model to use the hashtag #ad, but later deleted the post. The Federal Trade Commission has said #ad only worked if at the beginning of paid posts, and that the hashtag alone was not a sufficient disclaimer. A second class action lawsuit against Fyre Media, McFarland, Ja Rule, and the event promoters in Los Angeles was filed. The plaintiff alleges that they deceived patrons into attending the festival by paying over 400 social media personalities and celebrities to promote it. The parties are accused of breach of contract, negligent misrepresentation, and fraud.

== Political views ==
=== Activism ===
Ratajkowski has raised funds, done public service announcements, and committed to being in a short film promoting reproductive and sexual health for Planned Parenthood.

On the eve of the February 2016 New Hampshire Democratic primary, Ratajkowski spoke at a Bernie Sanders rally in New Hampshire to endorse his campaign. One of the main points of her speech, and her social media activity surrounding it, was to counter Gloria Steinem's statement that young female Sanders supporters were involved in the campaign to meet potential male romantic partners. In 2020, she again endorsed Sanders for the Democratic nomination.

During the 2025 New York City mayoral election, Ratajkowski endorsed the Democratic nominee, Zohran Mamdani.

=== Sexuality and feminism ===
Ratajkowski described the pressure that she endured as a youth around her sexuality and her thoughts on female sexual empowerment, in Lena Dunham's Lenny Letter newsletter on February 16, 2016. Elle magazine, Esquire magazine, and Harper's Bazaar republished her letter, which drew praise from critics including Glamour magazine's Hayley Spencer, The Huffington Post's Jenavieve Hatch, Cosmopolitan magazine's Nikki Kinstlinger, Rachael Moon of the Daily Mirror, and Georgia Simmonds of Marie Claire, who lauded Ratajkowski for observations, calling the letter "powerful". Salon's Erin Coulehan described the essay's identification of a societal catch-22, in which showcasing female sexuality that may "offend, excite, or create envy" leads to criticism and body shaming. InStyle's Isabella Silvers concurred that "female sexuality isn't always for the benefit of someone else". Charlotte Gill of The Independent admitted that she was in the minority in finding the letter "rambling" and "dull".

In an October 2014 Cosmopolitan interview, Ratajkowski said she enjoys freedom of sexual expression "while still being a feminist", and is outspoken about using her celebrity to support the empowerment of women and women's sexuality. Amanda Hess of Slate questioned whether she is a feminist or an opportunist exploiting feminism. Ratajkowski defended Kim Kardashian from criticism when Kardashian posted a controversial nude selfie on Instagram in March 2016, saying that women have the right to "express their sexuality and share their bodies however they choose". Then, Kardashian and Ratajkowski jointly advocated via social media for female sexual empowerment and against body shaming; nearly one million of their social media followers responded positively, and prominent global media outlets took notice. Commentator Piers Morgan reacted to Ratajkowski's letter by saying that her form of feminism was a misguided affront to true feminism, labeling it pseudo-feminist gibberish. After Morgan wrote that "feminism as it was intended is dead", the Chicago Tribune's Heidi Stevens, as well as The Daily Telegraph's Helen Pankhurst said that Ratajkowski neither killed nor bolstered feminism. Women's Wear Daily's Taylor Harris questioned the impact of Ratajkowski's feminism, as did The Independent's Gill, saying that Ratajkowski's professional activities "continued to advocate industries that treat us as pieces of meat". Heather Saul of The Independent wrote in support of Ratajkowski in an article subtitled "Ratajkowski is becoming an important feminist voice in the debate over female censorship and sexuality". New York's Allie Jones called Ratajkowski "the best feminist celeb".

In 2021, Ratajkowski published her first book, My Body, which includes several previously published essays as well as personal stories. An excerpt was published in The Guardian.

== Personal life ==
Ratajkowski has described herself as a meat lover and told Elle magazine in 2014 that she "really likes to eat meat" and stated that she craves iron. In a 2015 Vogue 73 Questions interview, Ratajkowski stated the weirdest thing she has eaten is cow tongue, and said her favorite pizza is "Anything with lots of meat and cheese".

From 2014 to 2018, Ratajkowski dated musician Jeff Magid.

On February 23, 2018, Ratajkowski announced on Instagram that she had married actor and producer Sebastian Bear-McClard, her boyfriend of several weeks, in a New York City courthouse wedding. They lived in the NoHo neighborhood of Manhattan and in Los Angeles. On October 26, 2020, Ratajkowski confirmed she was pregnant. In one of her essays, she wrote about how both she and her husband did not wish to discuss their child's sex until their child was born. She gave birth to their son on March 8, 2021. In July 2022, Ratajkowski and Bear-McClard separated, and she later filed for divorce that September. Later that year, she identified herself as bisexual, stating: "I think sexuality is on a sliding scale. I don’t really believe in straight people".

== Filmography ==
=== Film ===
Year	Title	Role	Notes
2004	Andrew's Alteration	Young Girl	Short film
2005	A Year and a Day	Girl	
2014	Gone Girl	Andie Fitzgerald	
2015	Entourage	Herself	
2015	We Are Your Friends	Sophie	
2018	Cruise	Jessica Weinberg / Francesca Russo	
2018	I Feel Pretty	Mallory	
2018	In Darkness	Veronique Radic	
2018	Welcome Home	Cassie Ryerson	
2018	The American Meme	Herself	Documentary film
2019	Lying and Stealing	Elyse Tibaldi	

=== Television ===
Year	Title	Role	Notes
2009–2010	iCarly	Tasha	2 episodes
2015	The Spoils Before Dying	Agent Day	3 episodes
2016	Easy	Allison Lizowska	Episode: "Art and Life"
2023	History of the World, Part II	White Mary Magdalene	Episode: "VIII"
2025	Too Much	Wendy	6 episodes

=== Music videos ===
Year	Title	Artist
2012	"Fast Car"	Taio Cruz
2013	"Blurred Lines"	Robin Thicke feat. T.I. and Pharrell
2013	"Love Somebody"	Maroon 5
2016	"Inseparable"	Dima Bilan
2024	"I Know ?"	Travis Scott

== Written works ==
=== Book ===
- Ratajkowski, Emily (2022). My Body. Metropolitan Books. ISBN 978-1250817860.

=== Essays ===
- — (February 17, 2016). "Emily Ratajkowski On Why Women Shouldn't Feel Guilty About Being Sexy". Harper's Bazaar.
- — (September 15, 2020). "Buying Myself Back: When does a model own her own image?". The Cut.
- — (October 26, 2020). "Emily Ratajkowski on Pregnancy and Why She Doesn't Want to Reveal the Gender of Her Baby". Vogue.
- — (June 12, 2026). "Mother F*cker: Sex As a Single Mom." The Cut.
