= List of Playboy Playmates of 2014 =

The following is a list of Playboy Playmates of 2014, the 60th anniversary year of the publication. Playboy magazine names their Playmate of the Month each month throughout the year.

== January ==
Roos van Montfort

Personal details
- Born: November 29, 1989 (age 36) Geldrop, Netherlands
- Height: 5 ft 9.5 in (1.765 m)

Roos van Montfort is a model who is the Playboy Playmate of the Month for January 2014. Her centerfold was photographed by Sasha Eisenman. She is the 60th Anniversary Playmate. Montfort started modeling at 20 when she signed with an agency in London. At the time, her ambitions were to move to California, become a Bond girl, own a business, and one day have a family.

== February ==
Amanda Booth

Personal details
- Born: July 14, 1986 (age 40) Watertown, New York, US
- Height: 5 ft 9 in (1.75 m)

Amanda Booth is a model & actress who is the Playboy Playmate of the Month for February 2014. Her centerfold was photographed by Tony Kelly. Booth is married to Southern California clothing manufacturer Mike Quinones. In July 2014, she gave birth to a son, Micah.

== March ==
Britt Linn

Personal details
- Born: July 20, 1990 (age 36) Wantage, New Jersey, US
- Height: 5 ft 10 in (1.78 m)

Britt Linn is a model & former surgical technician who is the Playboy Playmate of the Month for March 2014. Her centerfold was photographed by Josh Ryan. She is the first short-haired Playmate in more than 15 years. Ryan discovered Linn via her Instagram account and encouraged her to try out for the magazine. She previously modeled under the name Britt Linn Vee.

Linn started modeling after being discovered by a scouting agent on Facebook in September 2013 and went on to model during Mercedes-Benz Fashion Week in New York City. She later signed with RED Model Management. Subsequent modeling jobs were in Seventeen and Vogue Italia magazine and Diesel clothing. Linn married Paul Olczyk in November 2013 and gave birth to a daughter in December 2014. She credits her rural upbringing with her ability to hunt and turn a deer into venison.

== April ==
Shanice Jordyn

Personal details
- Born: April 8, 1992 (age 34) Sioux Falls, South Dakota, US
- Height: 5 ft 6 in (1.68 m)

Shanice Jordyn is a dental assistant and former Hooters waitress who is the Playboy Playmate of the Month for April 2014. At the time she was named a Playmate, she was attending Arizona State University on a part-time basis. She had previously appeared in the Playboy college issue ("Girls of the Pac-12") in October 2013 after being discovered while working at Hooters. Jordan moved to Arizona from Sioux Falls, South Dakota, when she was 17. She is a 2010 graduate of Mountain Pointe High School in the Phoenix suburb of Ahwatukee where she was a point guard on the school's basketball team. She credits her mother with encouraging her initially to pose for Playboy.

== May ==
Dani Mathers
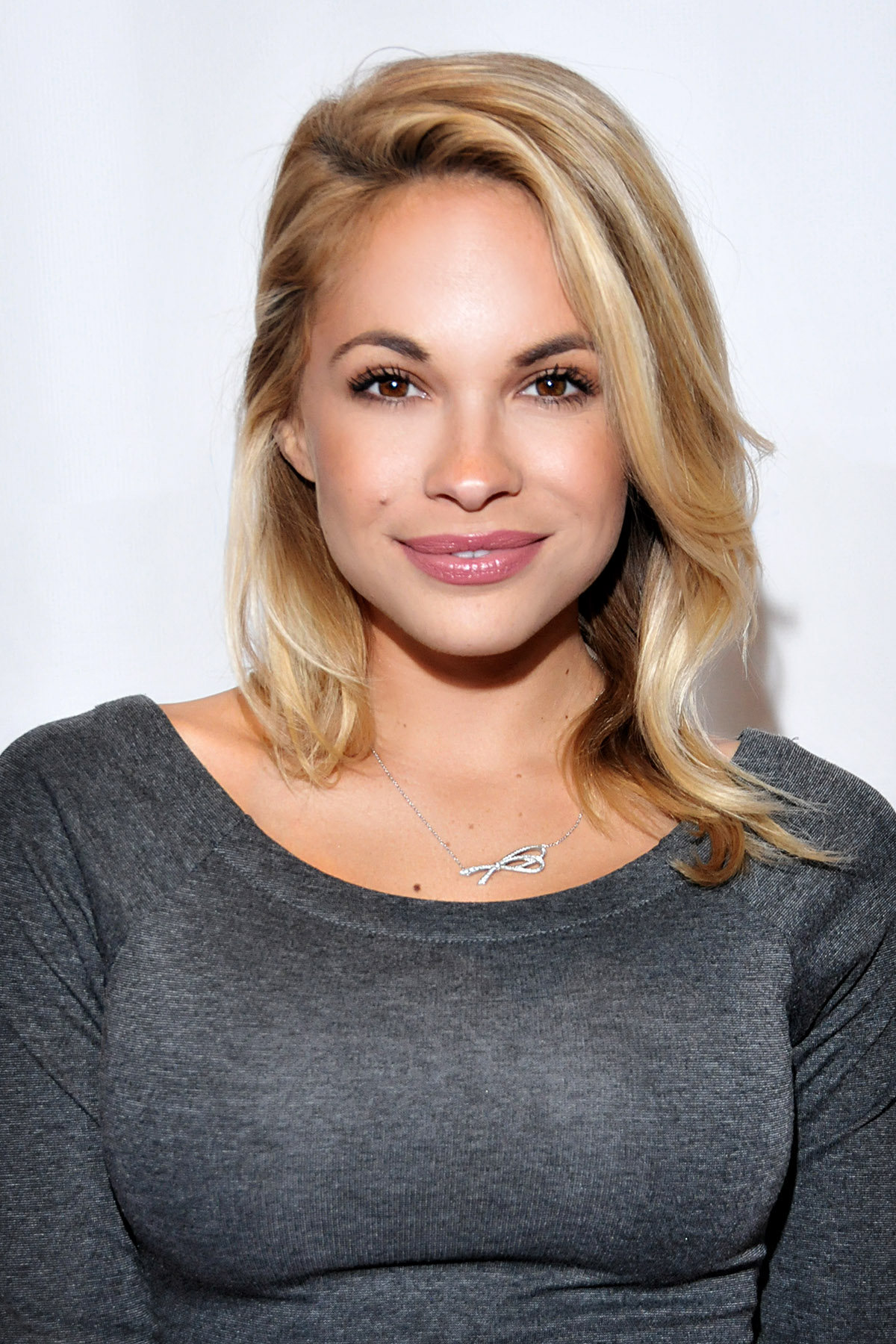
- Mathers in 2016

Playboy Playmate of the Year
- 2015
- Preceded by: Kennedy Summers
- Succeeded by: Eugena Washington

Personal details
- Born: Danielle Jenee Mathers; January 5, 1987 (age 39) Tarzana, California, US
- Height: 5 ft 1 in (1.55 m)

Danielle Jenee "Dani" Mathers (born January 5, 1987) is an American model and actress who is the Playboy Playmate of the Month for May 2014. Her Playmate pictorial was photographed in Cabo San Lucas, Mexico. Since 2005, she has appeared in a recurring role (as "Danica") on the CBS soap opera The Bold and the Beautiful. She has also been a Playboy CyberGirl of the Month in January 2013 and appeared on the cover of Playboy Girls of Summer, and she has also appeared on Playboy TV's Badass, Playboy Trip: Patagonia, Playboy's Beach House and Camp Playboy. Mathers has also appeared on The Playboy Morning Show and had a role in a 2014 short film titled Thrilling Contradictions.

Mathers says of her upbringing, "I'm from a big Jewish-Italian family. I was brought up playing in the mud, cheerleading and playing volleyball." She also enjoys playing video games and recreational shooting. In 2014, along with Playmates Amelia Talon, Val Keil, Kimberly Phillips, Anna Sophia Berglund, and Hugh Hefner's son, Cooper, Mathers took part in an Ice Bucket Challenge in support of the ALS Association. In 2015, she was featured on the cover of Guitar World magazine's annual Buyers Guide with fellow Playmates Nikki Leigh and Gemma Lee Farrell.

She was the Playmate of the Year for 2015.

Mathers later became a regular on the Heidi & Frank Show on KLOS radio in Los Angeles. However, on July 15, 2016, she was fired, after posting on Snapchat an image of a nude woman in the showers at the LA Fitness gym. LA Fitness revoked her membership and banned Mathers for life from all its fitness centers.

On November 4, 2016, a misdemeanor invasion of privacy charge was filed against Mathers by the Los Angeles city attorney, alleging that she secretly photographed a 70-year-old woman in the nude at a Los Angeles gym and then posted the image of the woman on her Snapchat social media account. Mathers pled No Contest to the charge and was sentenced to thirty days of community service, which she spent cleaning graffiti from public areas.

== June ==
Jessica Ashley

Personal details
- Born: December 8, 1989 (age 36) Detroit, Michigan, US
- Height: 5 ft 9 in (1.75 m)

Jessica Ashley is a model and a 2011 graduate of the University of Michigan who is the Playboy Playmate of the Month for June 2014. Her centerfold was photographed by Sasha Eisenman. She appeared in a music video for Kevin Fowler's Love Song. Her bachelor's degree is in English and psychology. She was discovered by Playboy TV's Scott Cope via her Facebook page.

== July ==
Emily Agnes

Personal details
- Born: July 11, 1991 (age 35) Windlesham, Surrey, England, UK
- Height: 5 ft 8 in (1.73 m)

Emily Agnes is a British model who was the Playboy Playmate of the Month for July 2014. Her centerfold was shot by photographer Tony Kelly. She has previously appeared in FHM, the Czech edition of Maxim, and some British lads magazines as Emily Shaw. She was the first British woman in a decade to become a Playmate.

== August ==
Maggie May

Personal details
- Born: November 15, 1987 (age 38) Wamego, Kansas, US
- Height: 5 ft 11 in (1.80 m)

Maggie May is a model and the Playboy Playmate of the Month for August 2014. Her pictorial was photographed by Josh Ryan. Prior to her Playboy appearance, May was already an established international model having worked for companies such as Calvin Klein, Neiman Marcus, and Planet Blue. She has been represented by Wilhelmina Models in Miami and Elite Model Management. May commented that she accepted Playboy's offer to model after she saw the issue with model Kate Moss' pictorial.

== September ==
Stephanie Branton

Personal details
- Born: May 18, 1990 (age 36) Conception Bay South, Newfoundland, Canada
- Height: 5 ft 7 in (1.70 m)

Stephanie Branton is a model and the Playboy Playmate of the Month for September 2014. Her pictorial was photographed by Josh Ryan. She was discovered by a casting director at a Playboy Golf event in Toronto. Branton was initially featured in an online version of Playboy in 2012, and she is the third woman from Newfoundland and Labrador to be a Playboy cover girl. The others were Shannon Tweed and Danielle House. She has since appeared in a pre-Super Bowl "teaser" advertisement, called "The Big Race", prepared by Mercedes-Benz and will be featured in a Super Bowl XLIX commercial featuring NFL veteran Jerry Rice.

== October ==
Roxanna June

Personal details
- Born: June 7, 1991 (age 35) Stratford, Ontario, Canada
- Height: 5 ft 9 in (1.75 m)

Roxanna June is a model and the Playboy Playmate of the Month for October 2014. June graduated from an arts program near Toronto and has also studied acting. After moving to Los Angeles to further her acting career, she became a writer for the online publication Live Fast Mag. In addition to appearing in pictorials for the publication, she interviews various fashion experts and writes her own column in addition to being its Lingerie Editor.

== November ==
Gia Marie

Personal details
- Born: February 5, 1985 (age 41) Calabasas, California, US
- Height: 5 ft 8 in (1.73 m)

Gia Marie is a model and the Playboy Playmate of the Month for November 2014. She was discovered via her Instagram account and got into Playboy after contacting the creative director. Her Playmate photoshoot was done at the Sheats Goldstein Mansion, which was featured in the 1998 film The Big Lebowski.

Marie also has worked as a professional stylist, creating the hair and makeup looks for advertisements, magazine shoots, and music videos. Her clients have included The Black Keys, Britney Spears, and R. Kelly. Marie's modeling work has also included the Sports Illustrated 50th Anniversary pictorial. She credits her love of the arts – drawing, painting & photography – as her inspiration for becoming a stylist. Marie began modeling at the age of sixteen and used to have practice photo shoots in her garage with high school friends.

== December ==
Elizabeth Ostrander

Personal details
- Born: December 7, 1988 (age 37) Melbourne, Florida, US
- Height: 5 ft 8 in (1.73 m)

Elizabeth Ostrander is a model and the Playboy Playmate of the Month for December 2014. Ostrander's first modelling work was as the model for her own line of swimsuits that she made and sold on her Etsy website. At age eighteen, Ostrander moved to Greece and started modeling professionally traveling to Paris, New Zealand, Belize, and South Africa. Her appearances include Seventeen magazine and the Greek editions of Vogue and Lucky.

Ostrander is a 2007 graduate of St. Augustine High School and has a degree in photography from Daytona Beach State College. She is a self-proclaimed tomboy who has surfed competitively, camped, and traveled around the world. She is also a sailing enthusiast and moved to San Francisco to learn how. Afterwards, she began exploring the Pacific Ocean on a 41-foot yacht named Journey. Ostrander's first long-distance voyage was a trip from San Francisco to Bora Bora, a distance of over 7,000 nautical miles, with a stop in Hawaii. It was while docked in Hawaii that she perused a collection of Playboy magazines and came up with the idea of submitting her photos.

After her Playmate appearance, Ostrander has aspirations of becoming an actress and someday being a Bond girl. She also intends to start a family with her husband Erik and raise their children in her home town of St. Augustine, Florida. As of 2014, she works at the San Francisco Sailing Company and is a part owner of The City Yacht Company which is located in San Francisco's Fisherman's Wharf.

== See also ==
- List of Playboy Playmates of the Month
