= Inamorata =

Inamorata is the Italian word for a person's female lover. It may also refer to:

- Inamorata (album), a 1984 album by Poco
- Inamorata (novel), a 2004 novel by Joseph Gangemi
- Inamorata (brand), a 2017 apparel brand
- "Inamorata", a song by Animals as Leaders from their self-titled debut album, 2009
- "Inamorata", a song by Northlane from Obsidian, 2022
- "Inamorata", a song by Metallica from 72 Seasons, 2023

== See also ==
- Innamorata (disambiguation)
