= Treats! =

Erotica and fine arts magazine

- March 2012 issue 3 cover, featuring Emily Ratajkowski
- Editor-In-Chief/Publisher: Steve Shaw
- Categories: Fine arts
- Frequency: Quarterly
- Publisher: Steve Shaw
- Founded: 2011
- Company: Treats! Media
- Country: United States
- Language: English
- Website: Official website

treats! (often referred to as Treats, Treats!, Treats Magazine or Treats! Magazine) is an American artistic-nude magazine featuring models and celebrities. treats!' owner, Steve Shaw, and several media organisations describe it as a limited-edition erotica and fine arts publication. treats! published its first issue in 2011, and has published thirteen issues as of 2024, with its latest being published in 2020. It has featured celebrities such as Emily Ratajkowski, Lydia Hearst and The Fat Jewish, and photographers including Tony Duran, Mark Seliger and Bob Carlos Clarke.

In 2012, Shaw was sued by Tyler and Cameron Winklevoss who alleged that Shaw had mismanaged their $1.3 million investment in treats!. Litigation continued until 2024, when Shaw ran out of legal funds allowing the Winklevoss twins to obtain a default judgment. They then sued Shaw for damages, but the case was dismissed due to two legal mistakes, and the brothers missed out on a possible $2.2 million.

== Content ==
treats! describes itself as "a limited edition, fine art print & digital publication available only by subscription & sold at news-stands, book stores & worldwide." The literary content of the magazine has been described as "left-of-center" by Daily Beast. The magazine, which is based in Los Angeles, is described by USA Today, The Huffington Post, and The New York Times as an artistic erotica magazine. Adam Tschorn of the Los Angeles Times noted that his "copilot" felt that the magazine's nude photography was "virtually indistinguishable" from Playboy's despite the "fine arts quarterly" billing. Steve Shaw, the magazine's owner and publisher, states that he doesn't see the magazine as "erotic" and considers women a part of his target audience.

== Publication history ==
Shaw has a background in celebrity glamour photography for Maxim, FHM, Playboy, and British Esquire. He states that he had become irritated with shooting restrictions such as "three quarters of one side of a boob... You can only show one inch down from the bum crack..." and with uncooperative subjects being pressured by their publicists to participate in the photoshoots. Thus, he says, he created his own magazine with what Daily Beast described as "female full-frontal nudity, luxe-y aesthetic, and [an] underpinning of fashion-world credibility" that has gotten "influential tastemakers and industry icons" to take notice. According to Shaw, treats! was founded to present content that was too risqué for magazines such as Vogue, Elle and InStyle. Shaw's nickname for photos that could not be used because they pushed the borders too far was "treats", and he decided to use the nickname as the title for the magazine. The magazine presents images that have not been airbrushed or photographically retouched.

treats! marketed itself as a quarterly magazine, and Shaw's initial investment was $600,000. As of 2012, he publishes the magazine independently out of editorial offices on La Brea Avenue in Los Angeles, with a staff of three people. Shaw served as editor-in-chief and publisher, Eric Roinestad was art director, Rebecca Black was director of photography, and the editor was Rob Hill, who had previously been editor of Hollywood Life magazine. As of 2013, the magazine throws an annual Halloween "Trick or Treats" party, along with a few other parties each year. In 2016, Shaw stated that these have been attended by celebrities such as Leonardo DiCaprio.

Debut issue cover featuring a Tony Duran photo of Irene Lambers and Cassy Gerasimova

The launch party for the magazine was held on February 24, 2011 at the James Goldstein residence as an Oscars-week party before the 83rd Academy Awards. Issue 1 of the magazine, which had no advertisements, debuted with a cover photo of models Irene Lambers and Cassy Gerasimova photographed by Tony Duran that was described by Business Wire as "edgy, scintillating and elegant". Articles in the premier included features on Jason Statham and Shepard Fairey. Five thousand copies were printed of the debut issue, and 10,000 for issue 2. Its launch was recognised with a "best new launch" award of 2011 by the Media Industry Newsletter.

The magazine debuted prices of $20 at the newsstand price, $65 for an annual subscription price and $15 for a download. With the fourth issue the newsstand price changed to $30. In 2013, the magazine added an online gallery that sold prints of the magazine's content at prices ranging from $395 to $3,995—depending on size and framing.

Emily Ratajkowski posed for several of the early issues. She states that her appearance on the March 2012 issue 3 cover is what brought her two unsolicited high-profile music video modeling roles (Robin Thicke, T.I., and Pharrell Williams' "Blurred Lines" and Maroon 5's "Love Somebody"). Thicke had seen the treats! magazine black-and-white cover and convinced director Diane Martel to cast her in the "Blurred Lines" music video.

Within the first year of its launch photographers, including Brett Ratner, were volunteering to shoot for the magazine. As of 2014, Duran, Mark Seliger, Ben Watts, Josh Ryan and Bob Carlos Clarke are among the photographers who have been featured.

The cover of the seventh, 2014 Spring/Summer, issue of treats!, which was published in April 2014, featured Dylan Penn, daughter of Sean Penn and Robin Wright, nude, except with a Fendi bag covering her groin. Penn was photographed by Duran. According to an E! Online report on March 5, 2014, Penn had declined a $150,000 offer to pose for the cover of Playboy.

The eighth issue featured Lydia Hearst on the cover and issue nine featured Julia Lescova. Starting with issue ten, treats! began offering multiple covers, and issue eleven featured The Fat Jewish as one of the designs, along with Ireland Baldwin and Sarah McDaniel inside. Issue twelve was released in 2017, and issue thirteen in 2020.

== Legal issues ==
In 2012, Shaw received a $1.3 million investment from Tyler and Cameron Winklevoss. Their business relationship quickly soured, and for multiple years, Shaw attempted to buy them out of the company before threatening to sue them. In June 2018, the Winklevoss twins sued Shaw in the Delaware Court of Chancery, alleging Shaw mismanaged $1.3 million that they had invested in the magazine. Shaw argued that no funds were mismanaged, and filed five counterclaims of fraud. In defense, the Winklevoss twins invoked the defense of laches, arguing that the counterclaims were time-barred as they should have been filed before June 17, 2013. This defense was accepted by the Court, and the counterclaims were dismissed. Shaw was involved in the litigation until 2023, when he claimed he had run out of funds for legal defense. In November the Winklevoss brothers obtained a default judgement, and then sued for damages.

The suit for damages was dismissed due to two "missteps", meaning the brothers missed out on around $2.2 million in damages. The brothers were awarded just under $1.4 million for mostly legal fees, plus post-judgement interest. Vice Chancellor of the court Nathan A. Cook analogised the suit for damages as like hitting a hockey puck, stating "sometimes you miss even when shooting at an open net."

== Format ==
The print editions are produced in oversized format on 70 lb. matte stock. The magazine is also available digitally in several formats such as on Zinio for iPad and as a mobile phone app as well as via the official website, a blog, and various social media websites.
