= Stonehearst Asylum =

2014 film

- Theatrical release poster
- Directed by: Brad Anderson
- Written by: Joseph Gangemi
- Based on: "The System of Doctor Tarr and Professor Fether" by Edgar Allan Poe
- Produced by: Bruce Davey; Mark Amin; Mel Gibson
- Starring: Kate Beckinsale; Jim Sturgess; David Thewlis; Brendan Gleeson; Ben Kingsley; Michael Caine
- Cinematography: Thomas Yatsko
- Edited by: Brian Gates
- Music by: John Debney
- Production companies: Icon Productions; Sobini Films
- Distributed by: Millennium Films
- Release date: October 24, 2014 (United States)
- Running time: 113 minutes
- Countries: United States; Bulgaria
- Language: English
- Box office: $3.2 million

Stonehearst Asylum, previously known as Eliza Graves, is an American psychological horror film directed by Brad Anderson and written by Joseph Gangemi. It is loosely based on the 1845 short story "The System of Doctor Tarr and Professor Fether" by Edgar Allan Poe. The film, starring Kate Beckinsale, Jim Sturgess, Michael Caine, Ben Kingsley, and David Thewlis, was released on October 24, 2014. It received generally mixed reviews from critics, who praised the film's cast and atmosphere but criticized it as lacking suspense and having a predictable plot. The film grossed $3.2 million worldwide.

== Plot ==
In 1899, an Oxford University professor demonstrates a patient with a case of female hysteria, Eliza Graves, before his class, including a young man. Though the patient protests that she is sane, the professor points out that all mental patients claim to be sane. The young man later arrives at Stonehearst Asylum, where he desires to take up residency. A group of armed men, led by Mickey Finn, allow him entry. Finn escorts him to the office of the superintendent, Dr. Silas Lamb, where he introduces himself as Dr. Edward Newgate from Oxford.

Lamb's unorthodox methods surprise Newgate. Lamb says that he does not believe in drugging or incarcerating patients, and he encourages their delusions when he feels it will bring them greater happiness. Newgate becomes infatuated with Graves, who is a patient at Stonehearst. During the Christmas Eve feast, Newgate and Finn argue and, as a truce, Finn proposes a toast. Before Newgate can drink it, Graves causes him to spill his drink and quietly insists that he flee the asylum, but Newgate refuses to leave without her.

Newgate discovers the actual asylum staff locked in the boiler room, who explain that Lamb and Finn drugged their drinks and led a revolt. Dr. Salt and Mrs. Pike warn Newgate that Lamb is a dangerous madman—a surgeon who murdered his patients during wartime, while Finn killed his mother and sister. Lamb makes Newgate examine volatile Arthur Timbs, whose family sold him to a sideshow, without any sedatives but just using his eyes, with Newgate managing to calm Timbs down by referring to him by his name, which is scrawled on the cell walls. Newgate attempts to recruit Graves, but she declines and tells him of Salt's abuses. Staff members Paxton and Swanwick escape, but are hunted down and slain by a posse led by Finn. When Newgate sneaks into Lamb's office to retrieve Salt's notes, he overhears Lamb and Finn conspire. Lamb forces Newgate to perform electrical shock treatment on Salt. When Salt suffers amnesia as a result, Lamb proclaims him cured of his delusion.

During the New Year's celebration, Finn murders a female patient, who is carried away by Timbs. Convinced that something must be done, Newgate attempts to spike the champagne with chloral hydrate. He is caught, and Lamb prepares Newgate for shock therapy. Newgate reveals to Graves that he came to the asylum to rescue her after he saw her at the Oxford demonstration. Lamb grants Newgate a final request: to look at a picture of Graves that he keeps in his pocket. When the picture turns out to be of one of Lamb's victims, the shock causes Lamb to stagger out of the room. Finn attempts to take control, but Graves and Newgate lead a revolt against him, as the other patients have become scared of his violent nature.

As Finn is electrocuted to death by Arthur, he bursts into flames which cause a fire to break out. Graves leads the patients out of the building, and Newgate leaves to find Lamb, who is near-comatose from the guilt over his actions. Flashbacks reveal that Lamb, a military doctor, executed his patients who were suffering from horrific war wounds as a form of mercy killing. He then attempted suicide, but his gun had run out of bullets. After they rescue the others, Newgate asks Graves to leave with him, but she says that she cannot be with him because he is normal. Newgate says that he is not normal, as he is in love with her, and has a secret to tell her.

Some time later, Graves' husband and the Oxford professor arrive to be greeted by Timbs, now the new gatekeeper. The professor asks for Mrs. Graves' release, but Mrs. Pike says that Newgate already released her. The Oxford professor reveals that he is actually Dr. Edward Newgate, and the man they knew is an escaped mental patient with pseudologia fantastica. Upon hearing this, Lamb (playing chess with Salt) becomes amused and stifles a laugh in front of both visitors. Eliza and the imposter Newgate are shown in Tuscany, Italy, where they are known as Dr. and Mrs. Lamb. The two dance happily and embrace in the garden of another asylum, run peacefully by nuns.

== Cast ==
- Kate Beckinsale as Lady Eliza Graves / "Mrs. Lamb"
- Jim Sturgess as "Dr. Edward Newgate" / "Dr. Silas Lamb"
- Michael Caine as Dr. Benjamin Salt
- Ben Kingsley as Dr. Silas Lamb
- David Thewlis as Mickey Finn
- Brendan Gleeson as Dr. Edward Newgate / The Alienist
- Sinéad Cusack as Mrs. Pike
- Sophie Kennedy Clark as Millie
- Christopher Fulford as Paxton
- Jason Flemyng as Swanwick
- Edmund Kingsley as Sir Charles Graves, Bt.
- Guillaume Delaunay as Arthur Timbs

== Production ==
Principal photography began in Bulgaria on June 21, 2013. On July 31, 2014, the film's title Eliza Graves was changed to Stonehearst Asylum.

== Soundtrack ==
On November 25, 2013, John Debney was set to score the music for the film. The soundtrack was released digitally on October 14, 2014, and was released physically on November 11.

== Reception ==
=== Box office ===
Stonehearst Asylum earned a total worldwide gross of $3.2 million.

=== Critical response ===
On review aggregator Rotten Tomatoes, the film holds an approval rating of 54% based on 56 reviews, and an average rating of 5.44/10. The website's critical consensus reads, "Stonehearst Asylum offers over-the-top fun for genre aficionados; for others, however, it's likely to prove a dull disappointment." On Metacritic, the film has a weighted average score of 52 out of 100, based on 14 critics, indicating "mixed or average reviews".

Common criticism for the film centered upon what the reviewers felt was the film's failure to live up to its full potential, considering its atmosphere and all-A-list cast. The Los Angeles Times wrote, "On the surface, Anderson seems to have all the necessary pieces for a surreal psycho pop. But the fear factor eludes him, leaving Stonehearst Asylum more insipid than insane."

Film Journal International and The A.V. Club both praised the film for its themes; the reviewer for Film Journal International wrote, "While the film lacks the macabre humor of the original story, it does an excellent job of conveying the creeping horror of Victorian medicine."

== See also ==
- Quills, a 2000 film in which Michael Caine plays a similar role
- Shutter Island, a 2010 film in which Ben Kingsley plays a similar role
- Athiran, 2019 Malayalam movie which is also based on the 1845 short story "The System of Doctor Tarr and Professor Fether" by Edgar Allan Poe
- Lunacy, a horror film by Czech filmmaker Jan Švankmajer, partially based on the story "The System of Doctor Tarr and Professor Fether" by Edgar Allan Poe
