= Harper by Harper's Bazaar =

US magazine supplement

harper by Harper's Bazaar (referred to as "harper") is a supplement to the American women's fashion magazine Harper's Bazaar presented in various physical and digital formats.

== History ==
The supplement was introduced at 8:00 AM on February 9, 2015 by Harper's Bazaar editor in chief Glenda Bailey who describes its initial vision as "a contemporary supplement for young women". It was founded as a resurrection of Junior Bazaar, which Harper's Bazaar had published in the 1940s, according to Harper's Bazaar publisher Carol Smith. According to Folio: Magazine's Michael Rondon, the debut 24-page edition was sponsored by Nordstrom. Initially, the supplementary magazine had a print circulation of 375,000—about half its total paid circulation—and digital distribution of 8.1 million.

== Format ==
In 2015, it was produced quarterly with celebrity guest editors from the fashion world for its first three editions in February (Alexa Chung), April (Rosie Huntington-Whiteley) and August (Emily Ratajkowski). Each initial guest editor also served as the subject of a cover story fashion shoot as well as the subject a 24-hour day in the life feature. According to Adweek's Chris O'Shea, the supplement, which will feature a different guest editor with each edition, is a miniature version of the magazine that generates additional revenue by providing a forum for advertisers to promote their wares to "stylish and social millennial women who love to shop". The work is presented as a print insert to Bazaar as well as in a digital media, a social media and shopping media outlet.
