= Joseph Gangemi =

American novelist

- Born: Wilmington, Delaware, U.S.
- Education: Swarthmore College
- Occupations: Screenwriter; novelist

Joseph Gangemi is an American screenwriter and novelist. Born in Wilmington, Delaware, he graduated from Swarthmore College in 1992. He lives outside Philadelphia with his wife and young children.

== Bibliography ==
=== Film ===
- Wind Chill (2007, with Steven A. Katz)
- Stonehearst Asylum (2014)
- Go with Me (2015, with Gregory Jacobs)

== Television ==
- Spirit Box (2009, NBC TV anthology series Fear Itself)
- Red Oaks (2014-, Amazon Original TV series, Co-Creator / Executive Producer)

== Novels ==
- Inamorata (2004)
