= Red Oaks =

Television series

- Genre: Comedy drama; Coming-of-age
- Created by: Gregory Jacobs; Joe Gangemi
- Starring: Craig Roberts; Jennifer Grey; Richard Kind; Greer Barnes; Ennis Esmer; Gage Golightly; Oliver Cooper; Josh Meyers; Alexandra Socha; Paul Reiser; Gina Gershon; Freddie Roman; Alexandra Turshen
- Composer: Chad Benton
- Country of origin: United States
- Original language: English
- No. of seasons: 3
- No. of episodes: 26

Production
- Executive producers: Joe Gangemi; David Gordon Green; Gregory Jacobs; Steven Soderbergh
- Camera setup: Single-camera
- Running time: 30 minutes
- Production companies: Gabdec Productions; Picrow; Amazon Studios

Original release
- Network: Amazon Prime Video
- Release: August 28, 2014 – October 20, 2017

Red Oaks is an American comedy drama television series created by Joe Gangemi and Gregory Jacobs. The first season was released on Amazon Prime Video on October 9, 2015. On December 18, 2015, Amazon announced that the show would be returning for a second season in 2016. The second season was released on November 11, 2016. On January 30, 2017, Amazon announced that the series was renewed for a third and final season, which was released on October 20, 2017.

== Plot ==
David, a college student, begins working at Red Oaks, a Jewish country club in New Jersey during his summer break in 1985. The show follows David's life, with numerous subplots including his family, friends, and coworkers, and primarily revolves around the club. The show explores themes such as adolescence, relationships, socioeconomic mobility, and the pursuit of happiness in a mostly comedic fashion against the backdrop of the New York–New Jersey area in the 1980s.

== Cast ==
=== Main ===
- Craig Roberts as David Myers, a college student majoring in accounting who gets a summer job as a tennis instructor for the club
- Jennifer Grey as Judy Myers, David's mother
- Richard Kind as Sam Myers, David's father
- Ennis Esmer as Nash Nasser, David's supervisor, the tennis pro for the country club
- Oliver Cooper as Wheeler, David's buddy and a valet at the country club
- Alexandra Turshen as Misty, a lifeguard at the club
- Gage Golightly as Karen, David's girlfriend and an aerobics instructor for the club
- Josh Meyers as Barry, the club's videographer
- Paul Reiser as Doug Getty, president of the country club and also David, Nash, and Wheeler's boss
- Alexandra Socha as Skye Getty, Doug's daughter and an aspiring artist who takes a liking to David

=== Recurring ===
- Maria Dizzia as Professor Beryl Fox
- Gina Gershon as Fay Getty, Doug's wife
- Nate Smith as Skip
- Greer Barnes as Terry
- Rachel Feinstein as Jean Blum
- David Fierro as Ganz
- Brad Gilbert as Stan Feinberg
- Jessica Hecht as Rebecca
- John Hodgman as Travis
- Mark Linn-Baker as Rabbi Ken
- Tijuana Ricks as Shirley
- Freddie Roman as Herb
- Beth Stelling as Margot
- Michael Torpey as Derek (season 3)
- James Waterston as Dr. Dale Blum
- Allison Lanier as Annabelle (season 3)

== Episodes ==
Season	Episodes		Originally released
1	10	1	August 28, 2014
1	10	9	October 9, 2015
2	10		November 11, 2016
3	6		October 20, 2017

=== Season 1 (2014–15) ===
No. overall	No. in season	Title	Directed by	Written by	Original release date
1	1	"Pilot"	David Gordon Green	Gregory Jacobs & Joe Gangemi	August 28, 2014
20-year-old David Myers takes a job as an assistant tennis pro at the predominantly Jewish Red Oaks country club in New Jersey and tries to figure out what kind of life he wants to lead.
2	2	"Doubles"	David Gordon Green	Gregory Jacobs & Joe Gangemi	October 9, 2015
David finds himself swept into a surprising hustle when he agrees to be Getty's doubles partner for an outside-work tennis match. As David gets to know Getty's daughter, Skye, Nash nurtures dreams of playing the stock market, and Wheeler and Misty bond over a parallel parking lesson.
3	3	"The Wedding"	Andrew Fleming	Story by : Gregory Jacobs, Joe Gangemi and Max Werner; Teleplay by : Max Werner	October 9, 2015
David talks Barry into hiring him to film a wedding at Red Oaks. While the club comes out to celebrate, Nash squares off with a rival to impress the father of the bride, and Wheeler ponders an eccentric stranger's business proposition.
4	4	"MDMA"	Andrew Fleming	Story by : Gregory Jacobs, Joe Gangemi and Karey Dornetto; Teleplay by : Karey Dornetto	October 9, 2015
David's romantic plans for Karen's birthday go awry, while Sam and Judy's marriage counselors give them a new "empathy" drug to tap into their romantic feelings, and Misty sets Wheeler up on the world's worst blind date.
5	5	"Fourth of July"	Hal Hartley	Story by : Gregory Jacobs & Joe Gangemi and Shawn Harwell; Teleplay by : Shawn Harwell and Gregory Jacobs & Joe Gangemi	October 9, 2015
With Red Oaks' Independence Day party in full swing, Getty enlists David as his coach for the upcoming club tennis championship, and Wheeler catches Misty's boyfriend in a compromising position. Meanwhile, Judy struggles with conflicted feelings for her female yoga teacher.
6	6	"Swingers"	Nisha Ganatra	Story by : Gregory Jacobs & Joe Gangemi and Thomas G. Papa, Jr. Teleplay by : Thomas G. Papa, Jr.	October 9, 2015
David is hired to film a sex tape for middle-aged swingers from the club, but the experience is not quite the stuff of fantasy. Meanwhile, Karen tries her hand at modeling for Barry, and Judy throws a party for the students in her real estate class, to Sam's chagrin.
7	7	"Body Swap"	Amy Heckerling	Joe Gangemi & Gregory Jacobs	October 9, 2015
A mysterious Japanese liquor gives David and Sam an intimate glimpse into each other's lives.
8	8	"After Hours"	Amy Heckerling	Story by : Joe Gangemi & Gregory Jacobs and Laura Steinel; Teleplay by : Laura Steinel and Joe Gangemi & Gregory Jacobs	October 9, 2015
David and Skye ponder their respective futures, both romantic and professional, as they spend an evening in New York City. Wheeler and Misty spend the night driving around town and discussing life.
9	9	"The Bar Mitzvah"	Nisha Ganatra	Joe Gangemi & Gregory Jacobs	October 9, 2015
David's tensions with Barry, his recent night out with Skye, and his growing distance from Karen all threaten to derail a Red Oaks bar mitzvah he's been hired to film. All while Wheeler scrambles to recover a missing package of cocaine.
10	10	"Labor Day Luau"	David Gordon Green	Joe Gangemi & Gregory Jacobs	October 9, 2015
As the end of summer approaches, David coaches Getty for the Red Oaks tennis championship, and the Red Oaks staff say their goodbyes. But there are big changes coming for the Myers and the Gettys.

=== Season 2 (2016) ===
No. overall	No. in season	Title	Directed by	Written by	Original release date
11	1	"Paris"	Hal Hartley	Joe Gangemi & Gregory Jacobs	November 11, 2016
After revealing their feelings for each other at the end of last summer, David and Skye finally reunite in Paris to ring in New Year's 1986. But surprise guests threaten to ruin their romantic week in the City of Light.
12	2	"Memorial Day"	Hal Hartley	Joe Gangemi & Gregory Jacobs	November 11, 2016
As Red Oaks Country Club kicks off the summer season, David faces an uncertain future at school, while Wheeler tries to become something more than "just friends" with longtime crush Misty. Meanwhile, club president Getty faces a challenge to his status at the club, and Sam and Judy adjust to single life.
13	3	"Father's Day"	Hal Hartley	Story by : Joe Gangemi & Gregory Jacobs and Karey Dornetto; Teleplay by : Karey Dornetto and Joe Gangemi & Gregory Jacobs	November 11, 2016
Skye talks David into joining an uncomfortable Father's Day brunch with a less than thrilled Getty. Sam wants to celebrate with some father and son time of his own. Nash sets his romantic sights on a wealthy widowed club member, and Wheeler launches a new money-making scheme.
14	4	"The Bris"	Amy Heckerling	Story by : Joe Gangemi & Gregory Jacobs and Max Werner; Teleplay by : Max Werner and Joe Gangemi & Gregory Jacobs	November 11, 2016
David takes a freelance job videoing a bris and accepts Getty's invitation to lunch in the city. Back home, Judy enjoys Ladies Night with new friends, while Sam goes on a blind date.
15	5	"Independence Day"	Amy Heckerling	Story by : Joe Gangemi & Gregory Jacobs and Shawn Harwell; Teleplay by : Shawn Harwell	November 11, 2016
Getty prepares for his trial on insider trading charges. Nash's romance with Widow Horowitz heats up. Meanwhile, David wonders if he may be too suburban for Skye's new city lifestyle.
16	6	"Old Flames"	Hal Hartley	Story by : Joe Gangemi & Gregory Jacobs and Tom Papa; Teleplay by : Tom Papa	November 11, 2016
With the pressure of his trial weighing on him, Getty turns to an unusual confidante for moral support. One of Wheeler's students gets a little too close for comfort. And while Skye struggles to find her place on the New York art scene, David and Karen reconnect.
17	7	"The Anniversary"	Hal Hartley	Story by : Joe Gangemi & Gregory Jacobs and Max Werner; Teleplay by : Max Werner and Joe Gangemi & Gregory Jacobs	November 11, 2016
Tension bubbles as the Gettys celebrate their 25th wedding anniversary at the club. Meanwhile, Sam tracks down a lost love, Skye finds out about David's secret power lunches with her father, and Wheeler goes to increasing lengths to avoid a romantic blunder with Misty.
18	8	"Lost and Found"	Gregg Araki	Story and Teleplay by : Joe Gangemi & Gregory Jacobs and Shawn Harwell	November 11, 2016
Barry recruits David to film his bachelor party jaunt to Atlantic City, and Nash and Wheeler tag along for the most awkward road trip of their lives. Sam and Judy team up to search for his lost cat.
19	9	"The Wedding"	Gregg Araki	Gregory Jacobs & Joe Gangemi	November 11, 2016
As Karen and Barry prepare to tie the knot, David finds himself grappling with a forlorn Nash, arguing parents, and stark choices for his future.
20	10	"The Verdict"	David Gordon Green	Joe Gangemi & Gregory Jacobs	November 11, 2016
Getty feels the heat as the jury verdict-and the club recall election-loom. With the summer winding down, Wheeler and Misty confront tough questions about what fall brings. David must define his own independence and make a decision about Getty's lucrative job offer.

=== Season 3 (2017) ===
No. overall	No. in season	Title	Directed by	Written by	Original release date
21	1	"Summer in the City"	David Gordon Green	Joe Gangemi & Gregory Jacobs	October 20, 2017
Summer of 1987 finds David Myers living in New York and working at a video production company. Unfortunately his dreams of becoming a filmmaker—and his love life—are going nowhere fast. Meanwhile, at Red Oaks, tennis pro Nash learns alarming news about the future of the country club.
22	2	"Samwich"	Amy Heckerling	Joe Gangemi & Gregory Jacobs	October 20, 2017
While David angles to get hired to direct a dog food commercial, best friend Wheeler learns of a handsome rival for girlfriend Misty's affections. Nash visits Getty in prison, bringing dire news of a threat to Red Oaks. IRS Agent Terry pitches Sam on a business venture for which neither is qualified.
23	3	"A Little Business Proposition"	Amy Heckerling	Joe Gangemi & Shawn Harwell	October 20, 2017
Wheeler weighs an unusual proposition from his Columbia lit professor. Despite warnings from his ex-wife Judy, Sam decides to go into business with Terry. Getty recruits David to help save his beloved Red Oaks.
24	4	"Memories"	Hal Hartley	Joe Gangemi & Gregory Jacobs	October 20, 2017
Sam and Shirley run into trouble during a night on the town. Following a dressing-down from his boss Derek and a fight with Wheeler, David goes in search of a friendly face.
25	5	"Paroled"	Hal Hartley	Joe Gangemi & Gregory Jacobs	October 20, 2017
A newly paroled Getty makes a last-ditch effort to save Red Oaks from the wrecking ball. Sam's side business is dealt a major setback. Misty and Wheeler separately fend off unwanted advances. And David finally makes a decision he should have months ago.
26	6	"Action!"	David Gordon Green	Joe Gangemi & Gregory Jacobs	October 20, 2017
As summer winds down, it's the end of an era for Red Oaks Country Club... but the start of a bright future for David Myers and friends.

== Production ==
For his role as Nash, Ennis Esmer read with director David Gordon Green in both his regular voice and what The New York Times describes as "an invented accent he calls 'Indo Middle Eastern British'", while trying to get Green to laugh. Esmer used a vocal coach to improve the accent and continued using it while on the set.

=== Filming ===
The main filming location is Edgewood Country Club in River Vale, New Jersey. Additional locations include Florence Park in Mamaroneck, New York, Willow Ridge Country Club in Westchester County, New York, and Paris, France.

== Critical reception ==
Red Oaks has received mostly positive reviews. On review aggregator site Rotten Tomatoes, it holds a score of 81%, an average rating of 7.8/10, based on 26 reviews. The website's consensus reads: "Red Oaks offers an affectionate nod to 1980s sex comedies that – largely thanks to a talented ensemble cast – finds fresh humor in its familiar premise." Metacritic gives the show a score of 70 out of 100, sampled from 21 reviews, signifying "generally favorable reviews".

Entertainment Weekly gave the pilot a B+, and singled out Esmer's performance:

The amusing Ennis Esmer is the best thing here, as David's sleazy co-worker Nash. But it's sometimes hard to tell if Red Oaks is a clever dissection of old, reactionary sex comedies, or if it's just a reactionary sex comedy itself. B+

The New York Times enjoyed the pilot:

Set at a suburban New Jersey country club in 1985, Mr. Green's pilot is not a sendup of 1980s coming-of-age comedies or even a tribute to them, but a surprisingly straightforward extension of the genre. It's as if the spirits of John Hughes, Harold Ramis and the young Richard Linklater had all gotten together to consult.

Newsday liked it as well:

A funky retro-'80s distinctiveness makes Red Oaks Amazon's single best new series. Dryly amusing, the characters are sharply drawn and often appealing – even when they are not. Ennis Esmer ruthlessly heists every scene he's in, and Craig Roberts deftly creates a character you may even recognize from your own past – only funnier.

Chaney said this series is an example of 1980s nostalgia.

== See also ==
- Staten Island Summer
