= Puppet Master: The Littlest Reich =

- Theatrical release poster
- Directed by: Sonny Laguna; Tommy Wiklund
- Screenplay by: S. Craig Zahler
- Based on: Puppet Master by Charles Band; Kenneth J. Hall
- Produced by: Dallas Sonnier
- Starring: Thomas Lennon; Jenny Pellicer; Barbara Crampton; Udo Kier
- Edited by: Alex Campos
- Music by: Fabio Frizzi; Richard Band
- Production companies: Buffalo 8 Productions; Cinestate; Fangoria; Ghost Horse; Zero Trans Fat Productions
- Distributed by: RLJE Films
- Release dates: April 20, 2018 (Overlook Film Festival); August 17, 2018 (United States)
- Running time: 90 minutes
- Country: United States
- Language: English
- Budget: $2.5 million
- Box office: $643,614

Puppet Master: The Littlest Reich is a 2018 American horror comedy film directed by Sonny Laguna and Tommy Wiklund, and written by S. Craig Zahler. The film is the twelfth entry in the Puppet Master franchise, and is the first film produced by Fangoria under their "Fangoria Presents" label, following their acquisition by Cinestate. It is a reboot of the series, and stars Thomas Lennon, Jenny Pellicer, Nelson Franklin, Barbara Crampton, and Udo Kier. It was released on August 17, 2018, by RLJE Films. As of February 2019, the film has grossed over $600,000 through video sales.

== Plot ==
In 1989, escaped Nazi war criminal Andre Toulon propositions a Texas bartender. She refuses, identifying as a lesbian, and he recoils. He later induces his sentient puppets to kill the woman and her lover. Rookie police officer Carol Doreski follows Toulon to his mansion, where she shoots him to death after he pulls a gun on her.

In 2019, slacker Edgar Easton moves back in with his parents following a divorce. Attempting to rebuild his life, he reconnects with his childhood crush, Ashley Sommers, and unearths his deceased younger brother's prized possession, a disturbing puppet he discovered at summer camp shortly before his death. Googling the object, Edgar learns that its name is "Blade" and that it's based on a design by Toulon, who performed puppet shows before the rise of the Third Reich. Edgar, Ashley, and Edgar's misanthropic boss Markowitz embark on a road trip to sell the doll at an auction dedicated to original Toulon creations hosted by the Brass Buckle Hotel.

The retired Doreski, making his living as a tour guide for Toulon-related media, gives them a tour of the hotel. Doreski informs her guests that Toulon routinely abducted, raped, and tortured Jewish women upon his arrival in America. She also explains that Toulon is now entombed in an adjoining mausoleum, funded by a distant relative and built to architecturally bizarre specifications outlined in Toulon's will. Edgar and Ashley experience supernatural phenomena at the hotel, such as disturbing phone calls and the Blade puppet moving on its own. Their first night they realize Edgar's Blade doll is missing and report it to hotel receptionist Howie. The missing doll coincides with a number of murders in the hotel that night. Recognizing the names of several victims from the tour he and Ashley took, Edgar notes that all of the victims were either people of color, Jews or homosexuals, and suggests the deaths are hate crimes.

The police gather the hotel guests in the lobby, where the hotel's bartender, "Cuddly Bear", leads a revolt against the authorities and orchestrates an escape into the parking lot where the guests are attacked by sentient puppets. Many are slaughtered but Edgar, Ashley, Markowitz, Doreski, Howie, and another survivor, Nerissa, escape back inside. Edgar suggests the puppets are fueled by racist ideology, and Markowitz summons a puppet to the hotel kitchen by reciting a Hanukkah prayer. The survivors disable the puppet and find it filled with amethyst. The survivors split into groups and hide in the hotel. Hearing prayiers in Hebrew, Markowtiz convinces Edgar to help him rescue the guest but Markowitz is killed. Edgar and Ashley escape by jumping into a dumpster below a window. Nerissa dies when she strikes the side of the bin.

The puppets slaughter the remainder of the guests including Doreski and Howie. Edgar intuits that Toulon's mausoleum is integral to the puppet attacks and crashes his truck into it. The attack disables the puppets but results in Toulon's corpse reanimating as a zombie, which attacks and kills Ashley before wandering into the wilderness.

Sometime later, Edgar has achieved success as a comic book artist, documenting his experience at the hotel. After a fan asks if Toulon has truly been stopped, a visibly disturbed Edgar fails to respond.

== Cast ==
- Thomas Lennon as Edgar Easton
- Jenny Pellicer as Ashley Summers
- Nelson Franklin as Markowitz
- Lo Mutuc (Note: Credited as Charlyne Yi) as Nerissa
- Michael Pare as Detective Brown
- Alex Beh as Howie
- Matthias Hues as Strommelson
- Skeeta Jenkins as Cuddly Bear
- Barbara Crampton as Carol Doreski
- Udo Kier as André Toulon
- Serafin Falcon as Richard
- Kennedy Summers as Goldie
- David Burkhart as Brian

=== Puppets ===
- Blade
- Pinhead
- Tunneler
- Kaiser
- Happy Amphibian
- Mechaniker
- Grashüpfer
- Mr. Pumper
- Junior Fuhrer
- Autogyro
- Money Lender

== Production ==
Puppet Master: The Littlest Reich was announced in May 2016 with Di Bonaventura Pictures and Caliber Media (later Cinestate) optioning the film rights and S. Craig Zahler listed as writing the screenplay.

Swedish filmmaking duo Sonny Laguna and Tommy Wiklund were hired to direct the film in 2017. At the same time, Thomas Lennon joined the cast as the lead and Udo Kier was hired to play the puppet master Andre Toulon. Other cast members included Jenny Pellicer, Nelson Franklin, Lo Mutac, Alex Beh, Barbara Crampton, Tina Parker, Skeeta Jenkins and Michael Pare. The film began shooting in Dallas, Texas in April, with most filming occurring at the historic Ambassador Hotel. Some establishing and b-roll footage was left unfinished at the end of production; because Udo Kier was unavailable to return, Fangoria writer Preston Fassel plays Toulon in scenes where his face is not visible on camera. In 2018, during post-production, Zahler joined the writing staff of the Fangoria magazine, after writing the film for the company.

Veteran Italian composer Fabio Frizzi scored the film.

== Release ==
The film had its world premiere at the Overlook Film Festival on April 20, 2018. The film had its Canadian premiere at the Fantasia International Film Festival in Canada on July 23, 2018. It was released to video on demand on August 17, 2018, and was released on DVD limited release on VHS and Blu-ray on September 25, 2018.

== Reception ==
=== Critical response ===
On the review aggregator website Rotten Tomatoes, 70% of 47 critics' reviews are positive, with an average rating of 6/10. The website's consensus reads: "Puppet Master: The Littlest Reich delivers all the proudly distasteful B-movie antics genre fans might expect from a film about murderous Nazi dolls." Metacritic, which uses a weighted average, assigned the film a score of 52 out of 100, based on 13 critics, indicating "mixed or average" reviews.

Cody Hamman from Arrow in the Head rated the film a score of 7/10, writing, "Puppet Master: The Littlest Reich is a ridiculous bloodbath that viewers will hate if they don't agree to meet the film on its own flippant terms and go along for the ride. Viewers who can accept offensive humor will probably have a lot of fun watching it, and might find it to be uncomfortably hilarious." Meagan Navarro from Bloody Disgusting gave the film 4.5 out of 5 skulls, writing, "The Littlest Reich delivers everything that should come with a reboot; a reverence for the original property, its own spin on the mythology, memorable new characters, and more special effects insanity than you thought possible." Noel Murray of the LA Times called the film "good, sick fun", commending the film's "punchy" dialogue, cast, and animation of the puppets. Joshua Rothkopf from Time Out awarded the film 4/5 stars, writing, "The Littlest Reich is no Shoah but it does play around in the slop of real-life genocide and that makes it strangely transgressive. If you're in the right mood—not too self-serious—you'll get off on its vengeful payback". Jeannette Catsoulis of The New York Times gave the film a positive review, calling it "certifiably bonkers and cheerfully offensive", commending the film for its humor, while also noting the film's "flimsy" script. John DeFore from The Hollywood Reporter commended the film's performances and humor, while also noting that some viewers might find it offensive.

Not all reviews were positive. A.A. Dowd from The A.V. Club called it "a self-satisfied wallow in tastelessness". In his review, Dowd commended the film's gore, and music, but further stated that it was "a little too self-satisfied with its own 'transgressive' mean streak to be much fun." Keith Uhlich of Slant Magazine wrote a particularly scathing review, stating, "What talent Laguna and Wiklund have is of a purely amateurish variety. You can almost see the directors’ fingers moving the puppets through scenes like well-worn action figures, as if they were ‘80s kids filming their every Dadaist thought on a camcorder after renting the first Puppet Master at the local Blockbuster." William Bibbiani from IGN stated that, although the dialogue, performances, and gore were all "unusually good", he felt that the filmmaker's changes made to the franchise had "dramatically reduce[d] the film's entertainment value, and arguably rob[bed] these iconic puppets of the very characteristics that made them special."

=== Recognition ===
The film was awarded the Grand Prize at the French Festival international du film fantastique de Gérardmer 2019.

== Canceled prequel ==
In May 2018, a prequel titled Puppet Master: Aryans Ahoy was announced during a Q&A session following a screening of The Littlest Reich at the Dallas International Film Festival. Aside from the title, no other details were revealed. In September, during an interview with Wicked Horror, special effects artist Tate Steinsiek teased that the plot would involve the puppets on a cruise ship and the kills were expected to be much more shocking than in the previous film.

The project never materialized, partly due to work on other projects and controversies surrounding Fangoria's parent company, Cinestate, which shut down in 2020 following the arrest of producer Adam Donaghey for sexual assault and allegations of sexual misconduct. In October 2020, original series producer Charles Band confirmed in a Reddit AMA that there were no longer any plans for follow-ups to The Littlest Reich. Instead, he revealed that a sequel to the main series was in development, along with another solo puppet spin-off, which eventually became Puppet Master: Doktor Death.
