= Innamorata =

Innamorata may refer to:

- Innamorata (song), a 1955 song
- Innamorata (TV series), a Filipino drama series
- Innamorata (album), an album by Pat Benatar
- Innamorati, stock characters within the theatre style known as Commedia dell'arte

== See also ==
- Inamorata (disambiguation)
