= The Frye Company =

American shoe manufacturer

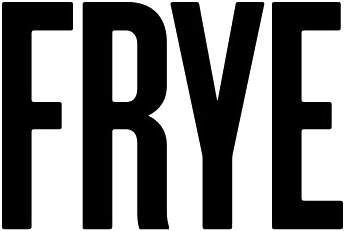
- Type: Subsidiary
- Industry: Leather Goods
- Founded: 1863
- Founder: John A. Frye
- Headquarters: New York, USA
- Products: shoes, boots, bags
- Parent: Authentic Brands Group
- Website: thefryecompany.com

The Frye Company is an American manufacturer of shoes, boots and leather accessories. Founded in 1863, it claims to be the oldest continuously operated American shoe company.

== History ==
In 1863, John A. Frye opened the first Frye shop on Elm Street in Marlborough, Massachusetts. In the 1890s, Marlborough manufactured more shoes than any other city in the United States. During that time, Frye was one of the largest and most successful footwear companies in the entire country.

In 1944, John Frye retired and the Frye family sold the company to Don Ireland five years later.

The company also introduced the Harness Boot in the 1960s, inspired by Union cavalry in the Civil War.

During the 1960s Frye made custom boots for Jackie Kennedy, Bing Crosby, Jerry Lewis, Barbra Streisand, Bette Midler, Ann-Margret, Walt Frazier, Stan Laurel and Oliver Hardy, Candice Bergen, Liza Minnelli, Carole King, Gene Autry, and President Richard Nixon.

In 1977, Don Ireland sold the company on to the Alberto-Culver Company.

The business was again sold in 1985, by Alberto-Culver to Stanley I. Kravetz. Two years later, in 1987, a subsidiary of Reebok (The Rockport Company) acquired Frye from Kravetz, though Kravetz remained in position as president. Under Kravetz' leadership, the Frye brand was licensed to the Jimlar Corp, a footwear company that produced Coach shoes under license, in 1993. In 1998, Kravetz bought back the label and sold it on to Jimlar Corp for an undisclosed amount.

In 2010, Jimlar was acquired by Li & Fung. Li & Fung spun off its brand management as Global Brands Group (GBG) in 2014.

In 2017 Authentic Brands Group (ABG) acquired a majority stake (51%) in Frye for $100 million, with GBG retaining a minority share in the business. A 2017 campaign entitled "Made in the USA" featured a number of American actors and models showcasing their use of Frye footwear, including Emily Ratajkowski, Selah Marley, Christopher Abbott and Luka Sabbat.

On 29 July 2021, GBG USA commenced voluntary Chapter 11 proceedings and is putting its apparel and footwear brands up for sale with help from a $16 million bankruptcy loan. The license owned by GBG for Frye, was then passed to Footwear Unlimited by ABG.

== Stores ==
The Frye Company opened its first retail store in 2011 in SoHo, New York City. In 2013, Frye opened stores on Newbury Street in Boston, Wisconsin Avenue in Washington, D.C., and Chicago.

In 2015, Frye opened stores at Ponce City Market in Atlanta, Roosevelt Field in Long Island, New York, NorthPark Center in Dallas, and Tysons Corner in Fairfax County, Virginia.

On March 27, 2020, all Frye Company retail stores were officially permanently closed.

== Archives and records ==
- J.A. Frye Shoe Company ledgers at Baker Library Special Collections, Harvard Business School.

== See also ==
- Allen Edmonds
- Horween Leather Company
