= Kennedy Summers =

American model (born 1987)

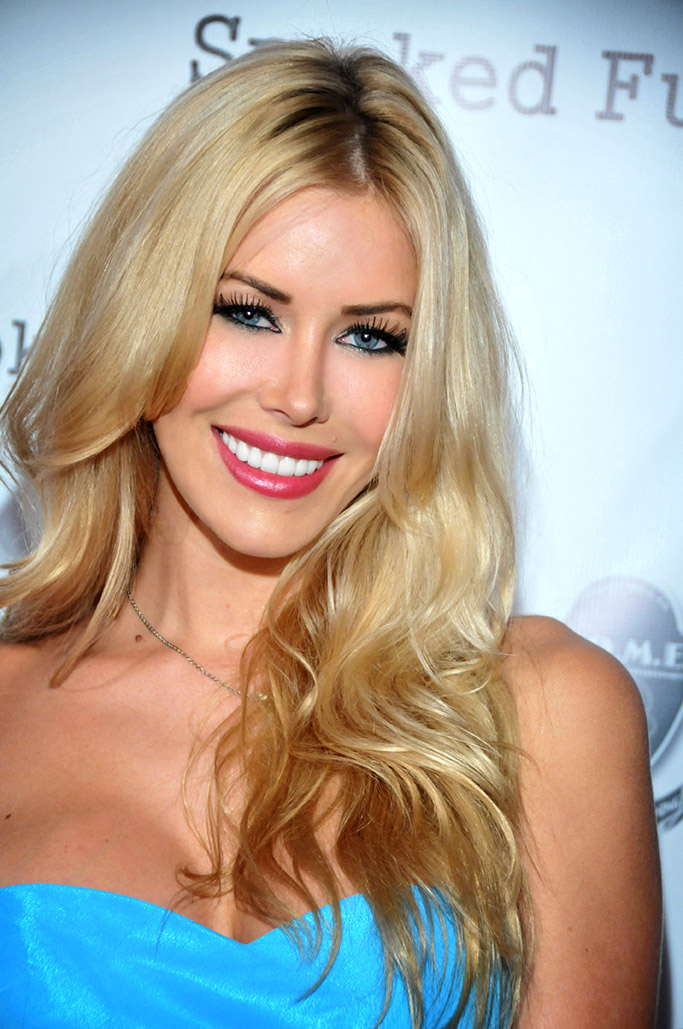
- Summers in 2014

Playboy centerfold appearance
- December 2013
- Preceded by: Gemma Lee Farrell
- Succeeded by: Roos van Montfort

Playboy Playmate of the Year
- 2014
- Preceded by: Raquel Pomplun
- Succeeded by: Dani Mathers

Personal details
- Born: March 3, 1987 (age 39) Berlin, Germany
- Height: 5 ft 8 in (173 cm)

Signature
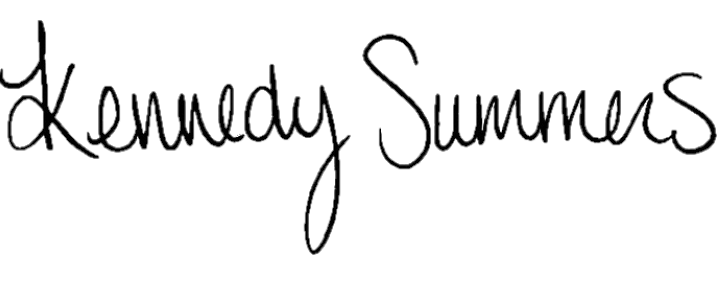

Kennedy Summers (born March 3, 1987) is a German-born American model, actress and stock trader. She was Playmate of the Month for December 2013 and was later named 2014's Playmate of the Year.

== Early life ==
Summers was born in Berlin, to a military family, and raised in Hampton, Virginia. Her father served in the United States Army and was a Russian linguist and cryptographer. Summers is also multilingual.

== Career ==
Summers began modeling at age 14, and retired after appearing in Playboy. She worked in stock trading as a day trader after being approached by Equities.com.

== Personal life ==
Summers graduated from Mary Baldwin College with a degree in anthropology. She holds a Master of Healthcare Administration degree, and attended medical school in Curaçao. She graduated with a medical degree (M.D.) in 2020.

== Filmography ==
Year	Title	Role	Notes
2016	Back Stabber	Diamond	1 episode
2017	The Last Movie Star	Beautiful Woman #2	Cameo
2018	Puppet Master: The Littlest Reich	Goldie	Supporting role
TBA	Muck: Chapter 1	Andrea Doria	Pre-production
