= Inamorata (novel) =

2004 novel by Joseph Gangemi

- Author: Joseph Gangemi
- Language: English
- Publisher: Viking Adult
- Publication date: January 22, 2004
- Publication place: United States
- Pages: 319 pages
- ISBN: 0670032794

Inamorata is a 2004 novel by American author and screenwriter Joseph Gangemi, published through Viking Adult. The story is inspired by the real life Mina Crandon, a spiritualist from the 1920s, and an investigation into her supposed abilities by a team from Scientific American, which included Harry Houdini.

The word "inamorata" is from the Italian, meaning "a female lover or a woman with whom one is in love". Film rights for Inamorata were purchased in 2006 by Johnny Depp's film company, Infinitum Nihil.

== Synopsis ==
Inamorata follows Martin Finch, a young college student from Harvard University and member of Scientific American, that is set to investigate Mina Crawley, a socialite and alleged spiritualist. Finch is sure that he will find proof that Crawley is a fraud but instead finds himself smitten with the beautiful young woman.

== Reception ==
Critical reception for the book was mixed to positive. In a review for The New York Times Douglas Wolk wrote that the book "affectionately evokes the pop culture and idioms of the Prohibition era, but it's almost too eager to show off its research" and criticized the character Finch as "an oddly blank protagonist". Mindi Dickstein, in a positive review for the St. Petersburg Times, called it a "compelling debut". In contrast, Charles Matthews, for the Journal Sentinel largely panned the novel, writing that it started well but later "unravels". Publishers Weekly gave a mixed review, writing that the book was enjoyable but that plot was "a bit weak" and that references to songs and wisecracks from the era "wear thin".
