= Inamorata (brand) =

Brand

Inamorata Swim
- Industry: Apparel
- Founded: 2017
- Headquarters: Irvine, California, United States
- Key people: Emily Ratajkowski
- Products: Swimwear
- Website: www.inamorataswim.com

Inamorata (formally Inamorata Swim) is a brand designed by Emily Ratajkowski that launched as a swimwear line.

On November 9, 2017, Harper's Bazaar UK published a story about Ratajkowski's impending release of her own swimwear brand after Emrata Holdings LLC acquired the trademark to Inamorata in August 2017. The website for the bathing suit line, inamorataswim.com, went live on November 16, 2017 with three bikini separates and three one-pieces. The initial bathing suit line debuted at prices ranging from $75 to $160.

The word "inamorata" is borrowed from Italian word "innamorata" and means "in love".

== Legal issues ==
On November 17,2017, designer Lisa Marie Fernandez sent Ratajkowski a cease-and-desist letter claiming a similarity between two of Ratajkowski's designs and her own. Although the law does not facilitate copyright protection for physically functional items in the United States, Fernandez has based her legal claim on two of her 2015 European Union Community Design Registration certificates since Inamorata ships its designs worldwide.

== Awards ==
In 2019, Inamorata and Ratajkowski earned recognition from Daily Front Row as Fashion Entrepreneur of the Year. Ratajkowski was named to the Forbes 30 under 30 list for Art & Style.
