= Tony Kelly (photographer) =

Irish photographer

- Born: 1975 or 1976 (age 49–50); Dublin, Ireland
- Occupation: Photographer
- Website: tonykellyworld.com

Tony Kelly (1975 or 1976) is a photographer from Dublin, Ireland. Originally working as a news photographer in Ireland, as of 2020, he was based in Los Angeles and working as a fashion and art photographer. He has exhibited internationally, with solo exhibitions in Los Angeles, Vienna, Miami Beach, and St. Moritz.

== Early career ==
Born in Ireland, Kelly worked as photojournalist while a teenager. During his early press career, Kelly covered news and international assignments, including reporting trips connected to the early stages of the war in Afghanistan in 2001, before transitioning into portrait, celebrity and fashion photography. In 1996, his photo of a kiss between musicians Bono and Liam Gallagher drew additional exposure and prompted a change in his career.

In the early 2000s, Kelly relocated to Barcelona, where he worked with photographer José Manuel Ferrater.

== Career ==
Kelly subsequently moved to the United States and, as of 2013, he was based in Los Angeles. His work has been published in magazines like Vanity Fair, Playboy, GQ, and Cosmopolitan. His work has been described by GQ España as "irreverent and provocative", and by Photo magazine as "spontaneous and hyper-energetic". Photo magazine also said that "his flashy style has conquered the world of fashion".

Kelly has photographed public figures including Bono, Justin Bieber, Kate Upton, RuPaul, Emily Ratajkowski, Adam Levine, and Will Ferrell.

His commissioned and commercial work has included collaborations with Faena Miami Beach, Oceanco, and St. Regis Hotels & Resorts, as well as campaigns for Estée Lauder, BMW, MAC Cosmetics, and Louis Vuitton.

During the 2010s and 2020s, Kelly increasingly focused on fine art photography. His staged images frequently depict travel, hospitality, celebrity culture, and luxury through humorous or satirical scenarios.

== Exhibitions ==
Exhibitions at which Kelly's works have been shown include Pills, Pools, Planes at Art Angels, Los Angeles (2018), A Colourful Mind at Preiss Fine Arts, Vienna (2021), Red Room at Faena Miami Beach, Florida (2022), and an exhibition at Paradiso St. Moritz, Switzerland (2022).

In 2024, he opened Tony Kelly World, a gallery and exhibition space in St. Moritz, Switzerland, dedicated to exhibiting his work.

== Publications ==
- Tony's Toys (2014)
- Taken! Entertaining Nudes by Tony Kelly (2016)
- NOWHERE (2020), a self-published photography book documenting Los Angeles during the COVID-19 lockdown.
- FAENA (2021)
- MIAMI (2024)

== Recognition ==
Kelly won a Clio Award in 2017 for campaign work connected to the television series Claws.

Kelly's commissioned work for St. Regis Hotels & Resorts won in the "Images" category at the 18th Annual Shorty Awards and also received an "Audience Honor".

== Personal life ==
Kelly has lived in Los Angeles and Miami. He is married.

In 2020, during the COVID-19 pandemic, Kelly participated in fundraising efforts supporting furloughed hospitality workers in Los Angeles through sales of his photographic works.
