= Josh Ryan =

American photographer

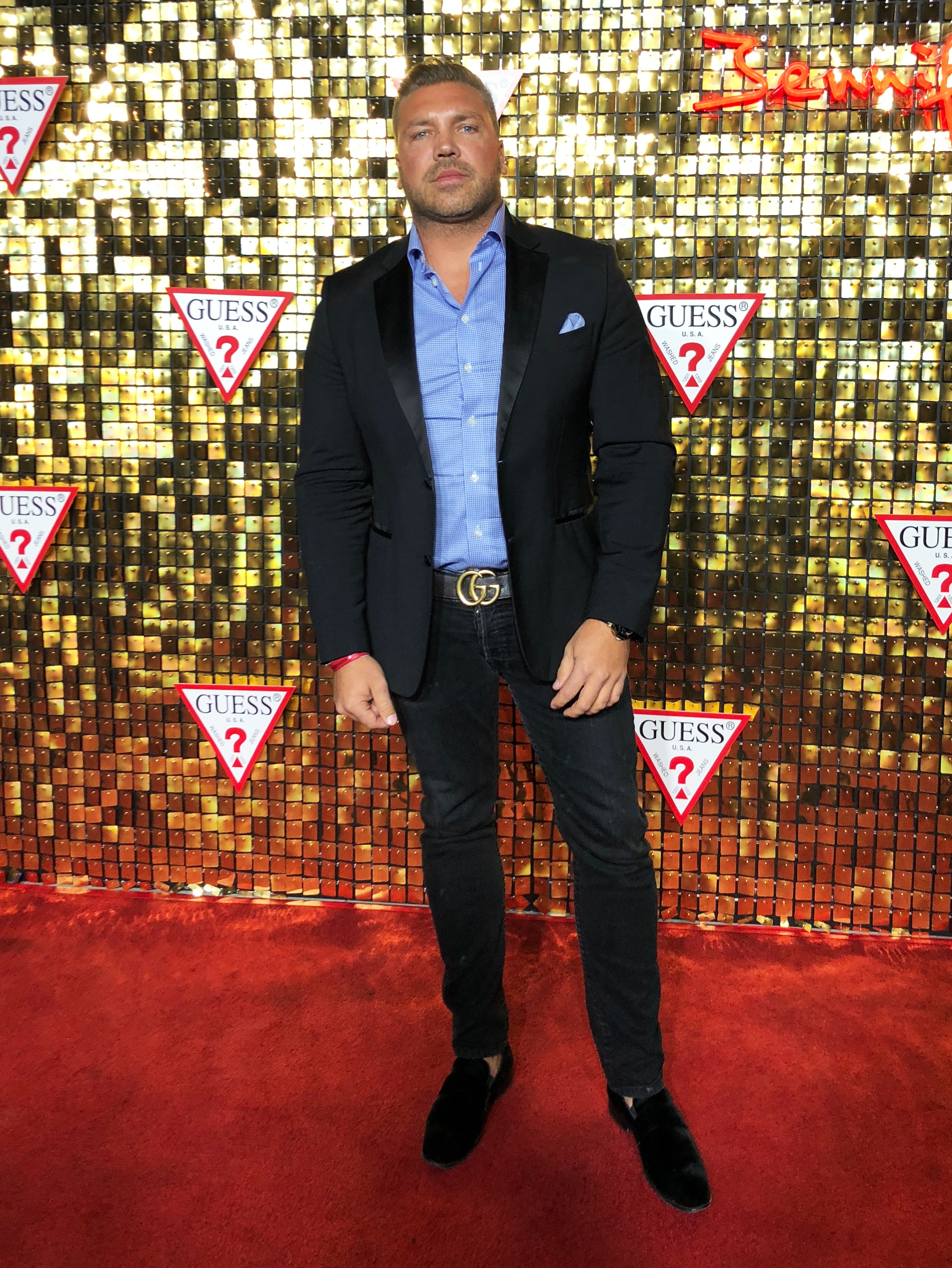
- Ryan at GUESS Jeans Jennifer Lopez Launch
- Born: September 5, 1974 (age 51); Sacramento, California, U.S.
- Occupation: Photographer
- Years active: 2004–present
- Website: www.joshryanphoto.com

Josh Ryan is an American fashion photographer, based in Los Angeles, known for his work with Playboy, GUESS, and Maxim.

== Career ==
Josh Ryan is originally from Sacramento, but moved to Los Angeles, at the age of 21, to work in the nightclub industry. Photography became a hobby of his during this time and in 2006, a friend he was shooting referred him to Playboy as they were looking for new photographers. He began shooting for Playboy Online, transitioned into Special Editions and Cyber Club, segued into Playboy Plus for their launch year and then finally shot for the magazine in November 2012. As the Senior Photographer at Playboy from 2006 to 2016, Ryan was responsible for transforming Playboy's signature "girl next door" look into more fashion forward pictorials incorporating his penchant for luxury cars, Mid-Century Modern architecture and of course unveiling female nudity with subtlety. His prime focus for each spread was to capture the beauty and aesthetics of the pictorial not only through an admiration for the female form, but also for the mise-en-scene of the production.

Since Playboy, Josh Ryan has worked closely with Paul Marciano shooting campaigns for GUESS. He's also shot advertising campaigns for Marciano, Koral Activewear, Nasty Gal, A.Ché Swimwear, and Baci Lingerie. His photography to date has been featured in magazines such as Treats!, Maxim, and Galore.
