= The Kooples =

French fashion retailer

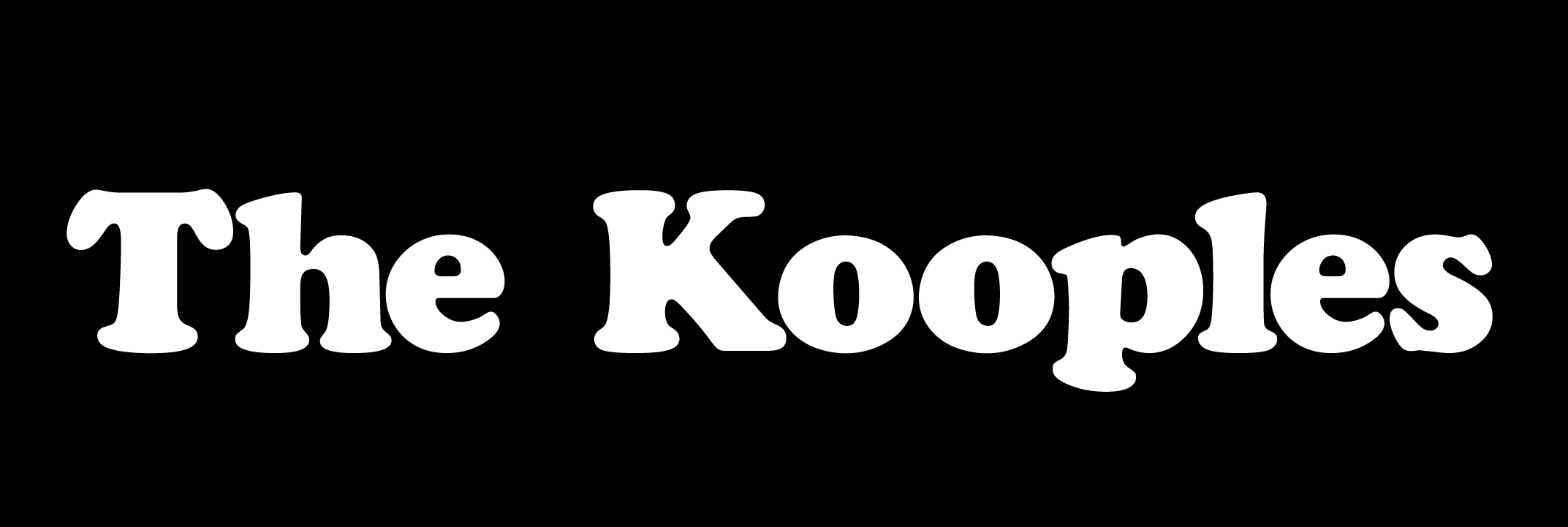

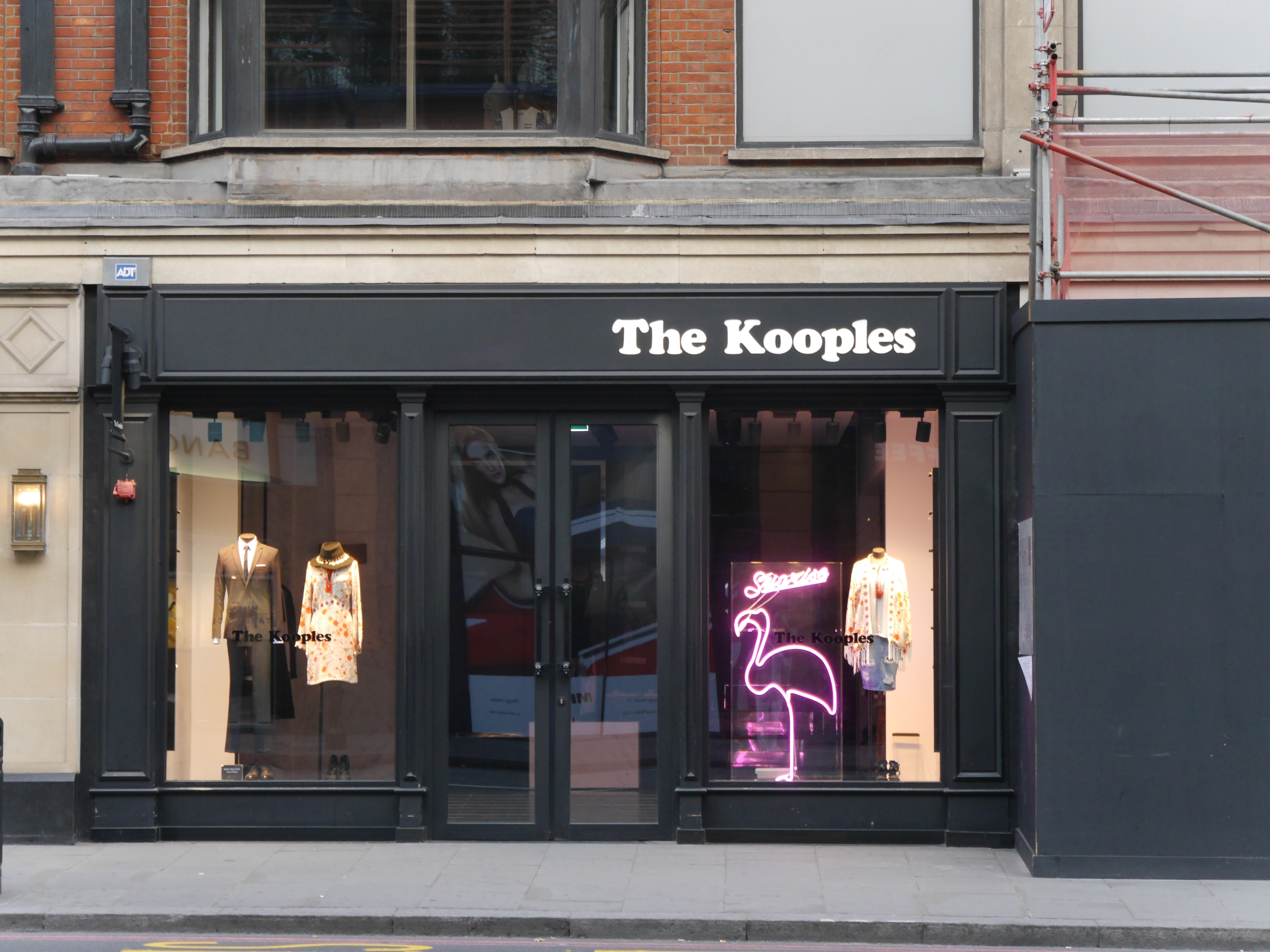
- The Kooples store, Brompton Road, London
- Industry: Fashion
- Founded: 2008; 18 years ago, in Paris, France
- Founders: Alexandre Elicha; Laurent Elicha; Raphaël Elicha
- Headquarters: Paris, France
- Area served: Worldwide
- Parent: Verdoso
- Website: thekooples.com

The Kooples is a French fashion retailer. Founded in Paris in 2008 by brothers Alexandre, Laurent and Raphaël Elicha, it was acquired by the French industrial group Verdoso in April 2025.

As of 2014, the company had 321 outlets in Europe. As of mid-2017, the company had 30 points of sale in the United States, including Bloomingdale's, and five stand-alone stores.
