= Tony Duran (photographer) =

American photographer

- Born: Winona, Minnesota, U.S.
- Education: University of Minnesota
- Occupation: Photographer
- Known for: Celebrity photographs

Tony Duran is an American photographer, known for his photographs of celebrities and his work with male models. Duran is one of the most widely published photographers of celebrities. Duran has received praise for his work in the fashion industry.

== Early life ==
Tony Duran was born and raised in Winona, Minnesota. He attended the University of Minnesota.

== Career ==
While at university Duran got his start in professional photography with a project called "All Women at tee U of M Are Not Fat and Ugly". His shots of one student won her the "Look of the Year" contest, which had previously been won by professional supermodels including Cindy Crawford. This launched his career as what Los Angeles Magazine called "a talented though technically untrained photographer." One of his notable shoots was of Jennifer Lopez for the cover of Glamour.

Duran is known for photographing nude and semi-nude models. This has led to lists such as Trend Hunter's "12 most scandalous Tony Duran photos." He also uses strange imagery and props in his work. This has led to some mocking reviews. His work with Beyoncé was reviewed by The Daily Mirror as looking like something out of Star Trek. Additionally, Duran is known for using his history as a student of art in his photography. Duran lacks formal training as a photographer, but has been noted for using his formal training as an artist in his work.
