= Mystery Submarine =

Mystery Submarine may refer to:

- Mystery Submarine (1950 film), an American post-World War II film
- Mystery Submarine (1963 film), a British Second World War film
