= Chac =

Chac can refer to:

- Chaac the Maya civilization rain god
- Chac: Dios de la lluvia, a 1975 film in the Maya language
- Red in the Yucatec Maya language
- Clonliffe Harriers
- CHAC, an acronym for Cannon Hill Anglican College
- ChAc, Chorea acanthocytosis, a rare hereditary disease
- chac, assistant to a priest in Maya society
