= Harry Keramidas =

American film and television editor (born 1940)

- Born: Harry Thomas Keramidas; August 15, 1940 (age 86); Wyandotte, Michigan, U.S.
- Education: Wayne State University, University of Michigan, UCLA
- Occupations: Film editor, television editor
- Years active: 1974–present

Harry Thomas Keramidas (born August 31, 1940) is an American film and television editor. He is perhaps best known for his work in the Back to the Future film trilogy, co-editing with Arthur Schmidt. He has also edited the films Children of the Corn, About Last Night..., The Favor, Judge Dredd, among other films.

He is alumnus of University of Michigan and Wayne State University, graduating with a degree in Industrial psychology. He also studied ethnographic filmmaking at UCLA School of Theater, Film and Television.

== Filmography ==
=== Film editor ===
- 2015: Back to the Future: Doc Brown Saves the World (short film)
- 2010: Speck's Last (short film)
- 2007: The Final Season
- 2006: The Hunt
- 2005: The Sandlot 2 (direct-to-video film)
- 2005: Deacons for Defense (TV film)
- 2005: Three Moons Over Milford (TV series)
- 2004: The Difference (video documentary short)
- 2003: Wilder Days (TV film)
- 2003: National Lampoon's Barely Legal
- 2001: Tomcats
- 2000: Beethoven's 3rd (direct-to-video film)
- 2000: Brooklyn Sonnet
- 1997: Hoodlum
- 1997: Contact (additional editor)
- 1997: Desert's Edge (TV short film)
- 1996: First Kid
- 1995: Judge Dredd
- 1995: Man of the House
- 1994: The Favor
- 1993: The Thief and the Cobbler (additional editor: Los Angeles)
- 1993: Attack of the 50 Ft. Woman (TV film)
- 1993: Johnny Bago (TV series, 2 episodes)
- 1992: Passed Away
- 1991: Tales from the Crypt (TV series, 1 episode)
- 1990: Back to the Future Part III
- 1989: Back to the Future Part II
- 1989: Chances Are
- 1988: Big Business
- 1987: The Squeeze
- 1986: About Last Night...
- 1985: Back to the Future
- 1984: Children of the Corn
- 1984: The Jerk, Too (TV film)
- 1983: Touched
- 1983: American Playhouse (TV series, 1 episode)
- 1981: The Children Nobody Wanted (TV film)
- 1981: Bustin' Loose
- 1980: Homeward Bound (TV film)
- 1980: Scared Straight! Another Story (TV film)
- 1979: Goldengirl
- 1978: Dracula's Dog
- 1977–1978: The Hardy Boys/Nancy Drew Mysteries (TV series, 2 episodes)
- 1977: Crash!
- 1976: Mansion of the Doomed
- 1976: Massacre at Central High
- 1975: Chac
- 1974: Memory of Us

=== Sound editor ===
- 1980: Ordinary People (dialogue editor, uncredited)
- 1977: New York, New York (sound editor)
