= Elisabeth Waldo =

American violinist and composer (1918–2026)

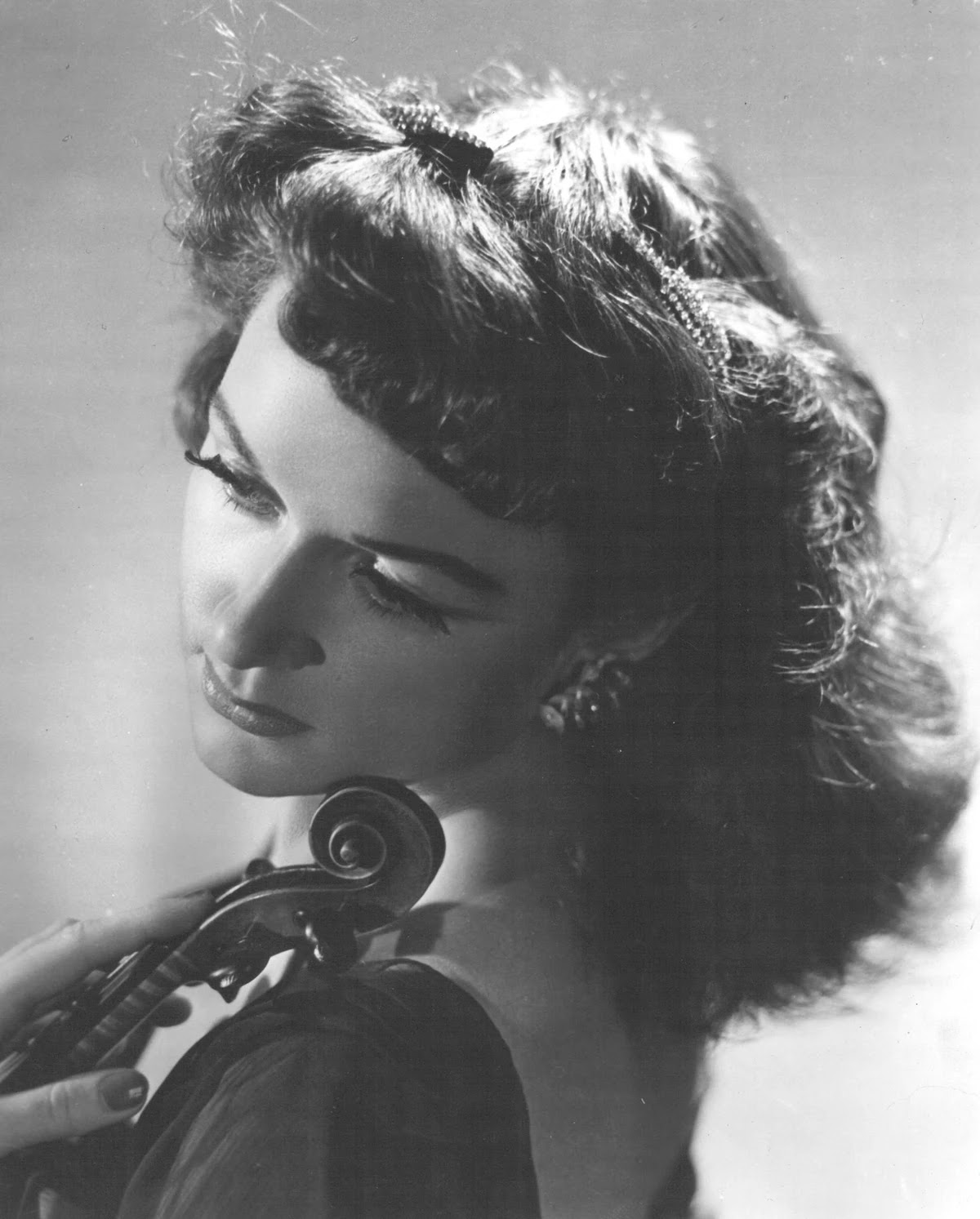
- Waldo c. 1950

Background information
- Born: Elisabeth Ann Waldo; June 18, 1918; Tacoma, Washington, U.S.
- Died: March 16, 2026 (aged 107) Los Angeles, California, U.S.
- Occupations: Musician; composer; conductor; ethnomusicologist
- Instruments: Violin
- Years active: 1940–2008
- Spouse: Carl Dentzel (m. 1948; died 1980)
- Website: elisabethwaldomusic.com

Elisabeth Ann Dentzel (née Waldo; June 18, 1918 – March 16, 2026), better known as Elisabeth Waldo, was an American violinist, composer, conductor and ethnomusicologist.

== Life and career ==
=== Background ===
Elisabeth Ann Waldo was born on June 18, 1918 (Note: Some sources, including 1920 & 1930 census records and a school census, indicate 1917 as Elisabeth Waldo's year of birth. The earlier year is more probable considering the date of birth of Waldo's younger sister, Janet: February 4, 1919.) in Tacoma, Washington, to Jane Althea Blodgett, a singer trained at the Boston Conservatory of Music, and Benjamin Franklin Waldo, distantly related to Ralph Waldo Emerson. She was the third-born of four siblings. Her younger sister was voice artist/actress Janet Waldo.

Waldo married Carl Dentzel in 1948, son of Edward P. Dentzel, a councilman and mayor of Beverly Hills, and Emma P. Dentzel, co-founder of the park system for Beverly Hills. Waldo and her husband shared a love of Asian and Native American culture and artifacts and he served as director of the Southwest Museum in Los Angeles. The marriage produced two children.

=== Early life and career ===
Waldo grew up on her family's ranch at the edge of the Yakama Indian Reservation in Washington state. She started singing at age three and took up violin by age five. Russian-born violinist Jascha Heifetz heard her play and helped her attain a scholarship to the Curtis Institute of Music in Philadelphia where she studied with Efrem Zimbalist and received her musical education. Waldo also attended Occidental College.

In 1940, conductor Leopold Stokowski invited Waldo to join the newly formed All-American Youth Orchestra. They toured South America in 1940 and then North America in 1941 before disbanding when the U.S. entered World War II. It was on these tours that Waldo's interest in musical archeology grew and she began collecting pre-Columbian instruments.

After the All-American Youth Orchestra, Waldo made her home in Southern California, where she played as a first violinist with the Los Angeles Philharmonic for one season. She returned to Latin America as a touring solo performer, playing in Panama, Costa Rica, Colombia, Peru, Chile, Cuba, and Mexico before taking up residence in Mexico City, where she was a regular on the newly networked national radio.

While living there, she collaborated frequently with singer Agustín Lara and appeared in the 1945 film Song of Mexico as a violinist. She also struck up a friendship with muralist Diego Rivera, with whom she shared an interest in pre-Columbian and Maya music. Rivera suggested that she develop her own system of hieroglyphic musical notation for working with pre-Columbian instruments, in order to teach others how to play them.

From 1954 to 1955, she played violin for Peruvian-American soprano Yma Sumac. Sumac's music fused Andean folk songs with Caribbean rhythms, big band jazz and operatic singing, and her elaborate stage show fit the "exotic" tastes of patrons of venues in Hollywood and Las Vegas, while also meeting the standards of quality to appear in the most prestigious concert halls in North America and Europe. While displaying her talents as a soloist in the orchestra, Waldo regarded her work with Sumac's touring show as part of her research into Latin American music.

Working with arrangers like Les Baxter and Billy May, Sumac helped define the music that would become known as exotica. Inspired by her time with Sumac, Waldo returned to Los Angeles and formed an ensemble that used instruments from Native North, South, and Meso-America to play her own original compositions.

=== Recording and later career ===
Waldo was among the first to bring many pre-Columbian instruments into a recording studio for her albums Maracatu (1959), Rites of the Pagan (1960) and Realm of the Incas (1961). Although based on her research in indigenous music, the albums were unlike field recordings of Native American music produced by ethnomusicologists at the time: they were made in the studio using the most advanced high fidelity and stereo recording techniques, and all of the compositions were by Waldo. For these reasons, her records would later not be regarded as "world music" but as "new-age music" and then "exotica".

Waldo was recruited to compose original music for a Latter-day Saint pageant, People of the Book, inspired by the Book of Mormon. The pageant played four shows at the Starlight Bowl October 1967 and was revived for a three-date run in Salt Lake City, Ogden, and Provo, Utah, where Waldo's music received the most praise as in an article in the Daily Universe: "the sonic experience made one's attendance at this production worthwhile."

Waldo began scoring film soundtracks in the early 1970s. During the 1980s, she became interested in the music of China and formed an ensemble that helped introduce Chinese music and dance for the Los Angeles Unified School District. The group toured several times to China as part of a cultural exchange with several Chinese conservatories. While there, Waldo performed her "Concierto Indo-Americano" with the Xi'an Symphony Orchestra. In 1987, she founded the New Mission Theatre, a 150-seat venue for use by the Multi-Cultural Music and Art Foundation of Northridge (a neighborhood in the San Fernando Valley region of the City of Los Angeles).

=== Death ===
Waldo died at her home in the Northridge neighborhood of Los Angeles, on March 16, 2026, at the age of 107.

== Discography ==
=== Albums ===
- Maracatu (Barbary Coast Records #33022, 1959)
- Rites of the Pagan (GNP Crescendo #601, 1960)
- Realm of the Incas (GNP Crescendo #603, 1961)
- People of the Book (Artisan Sound Recordings, 1967)
- Viva California with the St. Charles Choir (Peer Southern Organization #002, 1969)
- Sacred Rites (CD compiling tracks from her 1960 and 1961 LPs, GNP Crescendo #2225, 1994)
- Land of Golden Dreams (Southwinds Records #059, 2004)
- Heartstrings Soul of the Americas (CD Baby, 2008)

=== Singles ===
- "Making Chi-Cha"/"Balsa Boat" (GNP Crescendo, 1962)

=== Soundtracks ===
- Chac: Dios de la lluvia (1975)
- Lost on Paradise Island (1975)
