= The Manson Massacre =

- Theatrical poster as The Cult
- Directed by: Kentucky Jones
- Written by: Kentucky Jones
- Produced by: Tony Anton
- Starring: MaKee Blaisdell; Debbie Osborne; Sean Kenney
- Distributed by: Duffy Films Limited; Newport Pictures
- Release dates: March 25, 1972 (Clovis, New Mexico); August 4, 1976 (Boston); October 22, 1976 (Los Angeles)
- Running time: 65 minutes
- Country: United States
- Language: English

The Manson Massacre is a 1972 sexploitation horror film directed by Kentucky Jones and starring MaKee K. Blaisdell and Debbie Osborne. It is based on Charles Manson and the murders perpetrated under his influence in California in 1969. The film was originally released as The Cult, re-released as The Manson Massacre in 1976, again in 1980 as House of Bondage.

== Premise ==
The film follows the charismatic leader of a religious cult, Invar, who coerces a group of women into committing murders via coercion, beatings, and sexual games.

== Cast ==
- MaKee Blaisdell as Invar
- Debbie Osborne as Nana
- Sean Kenney
- Candice Roman
- John Vincent
- Cindy Barnett
- Vicki Peters
- Robert Warner
- Fern Tom
- Tom Welch
- Barbara Mills
- Ingrid Moore

== Release ==
The Manson Massacre was originally released under the title The Cult in 1972, and used advertising materials that downplayed its association with the Manson murders; a trade advertisement characterized the film as "so close to the Manson story... it's scary!" The film screened in March 1972 in Clovis, New Mexico, as a double bill with The Brazen Women of Balzac.

It later was released as The Manson Massacre in the summer and fall of 1976, with screenings beginning in Boston on August 4, 1976. It was subsequently released September 3, 1976 at various theaters and drive-ins in the Philadelphia metropolitan area. At some drive-ins, the film was paired as a double bill with Tender Flesh, and as a triple bill with Twitch of the Death Nerve and Psychic Killer. The film opened in Los Angeles on October 22, 1976.

The film received some criticism upon its 1976 release, and was banned from being shown Maryland along with Snuff due to its depiction of sex and violence.

=== Critical response ===
Mike McPadden of Crime Feed wrote of the film: "By way of sloppily arranged depictions of a nonprofessional cast engaging in fake-looking orgies and faker-looking gore murders, The Manson Massacre conjures the notion of a "movie" only in the fact that it's shot on film and, remarkably, once played to paying audiences in theaters. Makee K. Blaisdell plays Manson stand-in Invar, a monk-robed occult guru who sleeps in a coffin and cohabitates with five young women. They get freaky — and not just by driving around in a hearse (although they do that). They also engage in group copulation, grave robbing, and even the shoplifting of sex toys." Film scholar Ric Meyers deemed it "a poor excuse for a film," while Stephen Thrower noted it as "inaccurate and unconvincing" in its depiction of the Manson killings' aftermath.
