= Reagan Wilson =

American model and actress (1947–2026)

- Wilson in 1968

Playboy centerfold appearance
- October 1967
- Preceded by: Angela Dorian
- Succeeded by: Kaya Christian

Personal details
- Born: March 6, 1947 Torrance, California, U.S.
- Died: March 20, 2026 (aged 79)

Reagan Diana Wilson (March 6, 1947 – March 20, 2026) was an American model, actress, and businesswoman. She was Playboy magazine's Playmate of the Month for its October 1967 issue, a centerfold of which was taken to the Moon as part of Apollo 12 in 1969. She also had numerous acting roles including in Blood Mania (1970) and Running with the Devil (1973). Her participation at a 1968 Men's Day event at the University of Washington was protested by Radical Women.

== Life and career ==
Wilson was born in Torrance, California, and had a younger brother and sister. All three were of Norwegian descent and moved with their mother to Missoula, Montana after their parents divorced. Reagan studied journalism at the University of Montana. She began working as a model after relocating to Los Angeles in the 1960s.

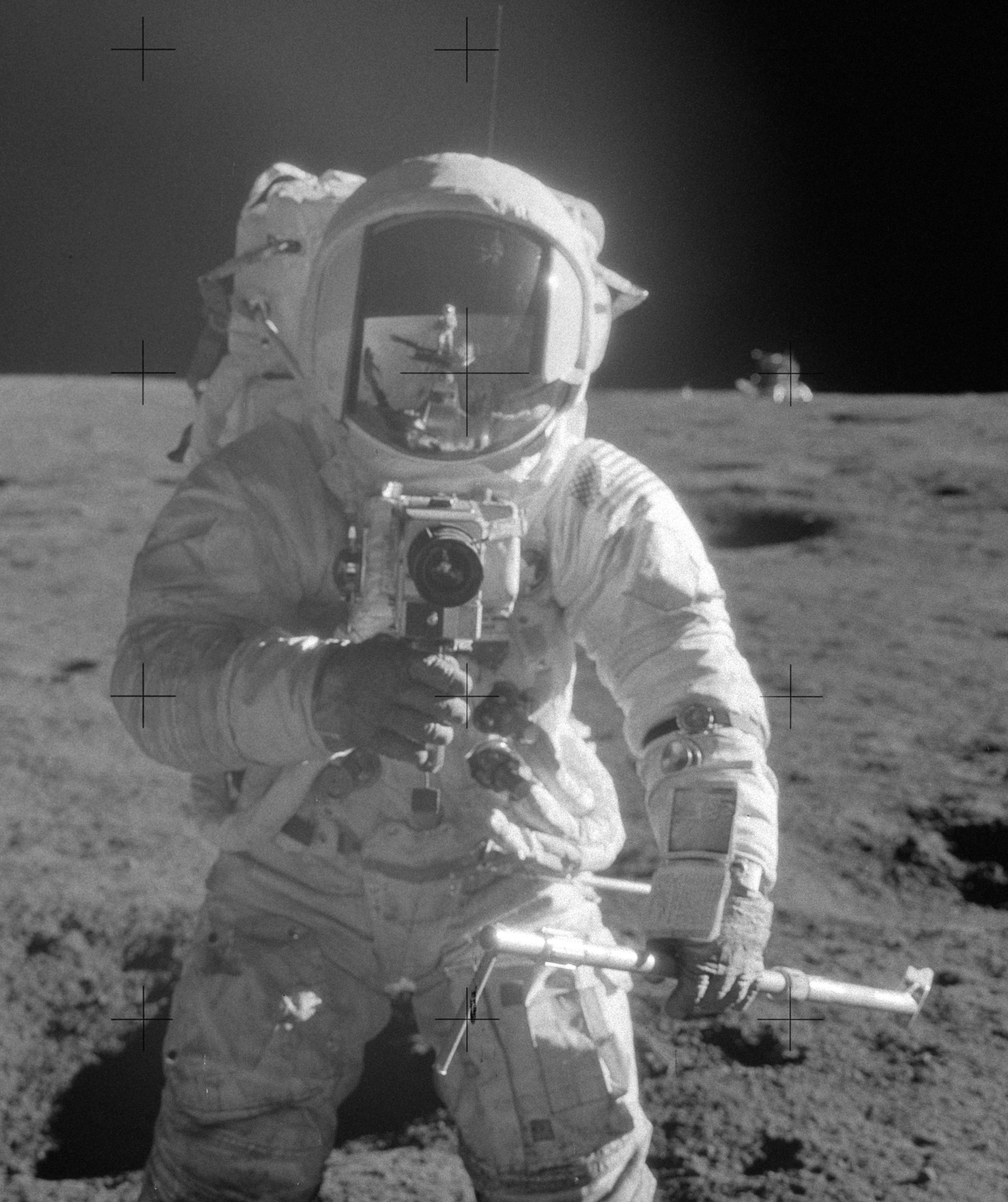
Astronaut Pete Conrad on the Moon, with his cuff checklist (Note: The cuff checklists were created during mission-specific training to provide detailed instructions for each astronaut. They were mounted on the wrist of their space suits for use on the lunar surface.) featuring Wilson's Playboy photograph

Wilson was Playboy magazine's Playmate of the Month for its October 1967 issue. Her centerfold, which was photographed by Ron Vogel and featured her topless on a hay bale, was later photocopied, laminated, given the caption "Preferred Tether Partner", and concealed inside Pete Conrad's Apollo 12 cuff checklist by David Scott, which Conrad discovered on the Moon. Scott also concealed Angela Dorian's centerfold in Conrad's cuff checklist and the centerfolds of Cynthia Myers and Leslie Bianchini in Alan Bean's. The fact that Playboy centerfolds went to the Moon did not become public knowledge until the magazine wrote about it for the mission's 25th anniversary in December 1994, although Bean took a photograph of Conrad there featuring his cuff checklist open to Wilson's page. Conrad had that photograph framed in his home, not realizing that Wilson was visible on his wrist.

Following her Playboy shoot, she modeled in Paris, London, and New York. In 1968, her appearance at the University of Washington's annual "Men's Day" event was protested by Radical Women, with 450 members including Barbara Winslow storming the stage and chanting lines from the Book of Common Prayer. Winslow attempted to lecture Wilson on the ramifications of Playboy's portrayal of women and was promptly ejected from the stage and criticized by The Daily of the University of Washington and the Seattle Post-Intelligencer. Winslow wrote in her 2023 book Revolutionary Feminists that the protest should have been directed at the men who wielded power rather than Wilson.

Wilson made her film debut as a body double for Julie Newmar in the 1969 film Mackenna's Gold. She then appeared in the 1970 horror film Blood Mania, which also featured fellow Playmate Vicki Peters, and in the 1973 sexploitation film Running with the Devil. She also appeared as an actress on the television shows Rowan & Martin's Laugh-In, The Jack Benny Program, The Beverly Hillbillies, The Munsters, The Johnny Carson Show, and The Big Valley. She posed once more for Playboy for the December 1979 pictorial "Playmates Forever!" before marrying the writer Barry Hornig in 1982 and opening a textile rug company with him in Santa Monica, California. She regularly interacted with her fans on social media before her death on March 20, 2026, at the age of 79.

== Filmography ==
- Rowan & Martin's Laugh-In
- The Jack Benny Program
- The Beverly Hillbillies
- The Munsters
- The Johnny Carson Show
- The Big Valley
- Blood Mania
- Running with the Devil
- Mackenna's Gold

== See also ==
- List of people in Playboy 1960–1969

== Notes ==
Surrey Marshe	Kim Farber	Fran Gerard	Gwen Wong	Anne Randall	Joey Gibson
Heather Ryan	DeDe Lind	Angela Dorian	Reagan Wilson	Kaya Christian	Lynn Winchell
