= Jacqueline Dalya =

American actress

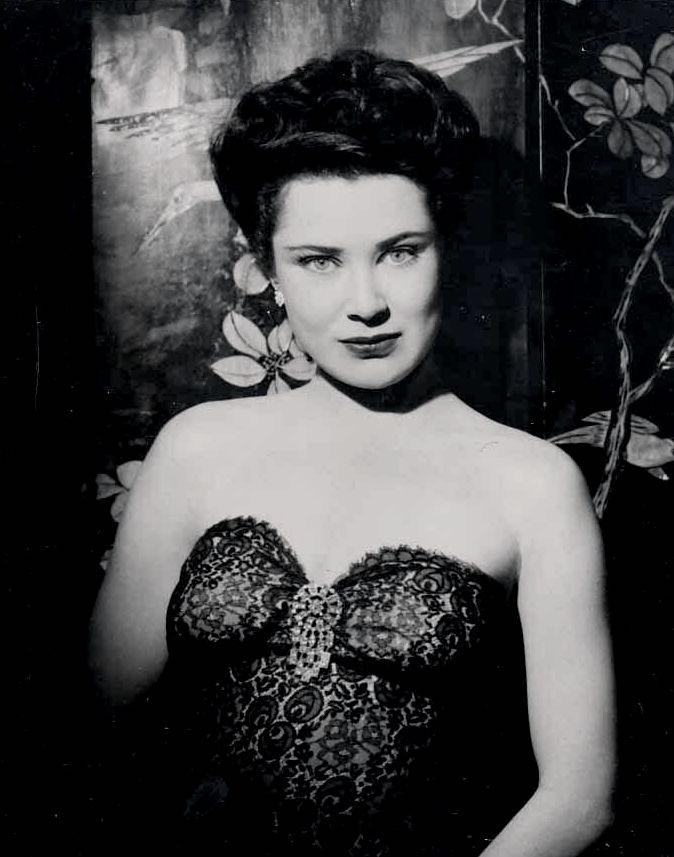
- Dalya in 1944
- Born: August 3, 1918; New York City, U.S.
- Died: November 25, 1980 (aged 62); Los Angeles, California, U.S.
- Occupation(s): Actress, songwriter
- Spouses: William Conselman Jr. (m. 1941; div. 1944) Bob Hilliard (m. 1949; died 1971)

Jacqueline Dalya (August 3, 1918 – November 25, 1980) was an American film and stage actress who began her career in the 1940s, appearing in films and on Broadway.

== Biography ==
=== Early life ===
Dalya was born August 3, 1918 in New York City.

=== Career ===
She appeared in numerous films in the 1940s, including Viva Cisco Kid, Primrose Path, One Million B.C., The Gay Caballero, Sky Raiders, Lady from Louisiana, Blood and Sand, Charlie Chan in Rio, A Tragedy at Midnight, I Married an Angel, The Secret Code, Submarine Base, So's Your Uncle, Crazy House, Flesh and Fantasy, Mystery of the 13th Guest, Voice in the Wind, Bathing Beauty, Song of Mexico, Queen of Burlesque, Adventures of Casanova, Mystery in Mexico, and Smugglers' Cove.

On Broadway, Dalya appeared in The French Touch (1945) and Now I Lay Me Down to Sleep (1950). In 1947, she made newspaper headlines after being injured while giving autographs to fans in New York City; when a fan grabbed her ankle and jerked it, Dalya fell, hit her head on the sidewalk, and suffered a skull fracture.

Her film credits from the 1950s include Wabash Avenue and Mystery Submarine. She later appeared in Blood Mania (1970) before making her final film appearance in 1972's Miss Melody Jones.

=== Marriages ===
Dalya married screenwriter William Conselman (son of William Conselman) in January 1941 in Las Vegas, Nevada. They were divorced in 1944. She wed lyricist Bob Hilliard in 1949, and they remained married until his death in 1971.

== Death ==
Dalya died on November 25, 1980, in Los Angeles, California.

== Filmography ==
Year	Title	Role	Notes
1939	Honeymoon in Bali	Hat Check Girl	Uncredited
1940	Viva Cisco Kid	Helena	Uncredited
1940	Primrose Path	Dalya - Carmelita's Friend	Uncredited
1940	One Million B.C.	Ataf	
1940	The Gay Caballero	Carmelita	
1941	Sky Raiders	Innis Clair	
1941	Lady from Louisiana	Pearl	
1941	Blood and Sand	Gachi	
1941	Charlie Chan in Rio	Lola Dean	
1942	A Tragedy at Midnight	Rita	Uncredited
1942	I Married an Angel	Olga	Uncredited
1942	Cairo	Female Theatre Attendant	Uncredited
1942	The Secret Code	Linda	Serial, [Chs.1,3,5,12-15]
1943	Behind Prison Walls	Mimi	
1943	Mission to Moscow	Russian Girl	Uncredited
1943	All by Myself	Bathing Model	Uncredited
1943	Submarine Base	Judy Pierson	
1943	So's Your Uncle	Garter Girl	
1943	Fired Wife	Divorcee	Uncredited
1943	Crazy House	Grown-Up Sandy	Uncredited
1943	Flesh and Fantasy	Angel	Uncredited
1943	Mystery of the 13th Guest	Marjory Morgan	
1944	Voice in the Wind	Portuguese Girl	
1944	Bathing Beauty	Maria Dorango	
1944	Gran Hotel	Mrs. White	
1945	Song of Mexico	Eve Parker	
1946	Queen of Burlesque	Dolly DeVoe	
1948	The Treasure of the Sierra Madre	Flashy Girl	Uncredited
1948	Adventures of Casanova	Lady Adria	
1948	Mystery in Mexico	Dolores Fernandez	
1948	Smugglers' Cove	Sandra Hasso	
1949	Mighty Joe Young	Nightclub Dancer	Uncredited
1950	Wabash Avenue	Cleo	
1950	Mystery Submarine	Carla von Molter	
1970	Love Me Like I Do	Attorney's Wife	
1970	Blood Mania	Kate	
1972	Miss Melody Jones	Helen	(final film role)
