= Submarine Base (film) =

1943 film by Albert H. Kelley

- Directed by: Albert H. Kelley
- Written by: George M. Merrick; Arthur St. Claire
- Produced by: Jack Schwarz
- Starring: See below
- Cinematography: Marcel Le Picard
- Edited by: Holbrook N. Todd
- Music by: Charles Dant
- Distributed by: Producers Releasing Corporation
- Release date: 20 July 1943
- Running time: 65 minutes
- Country: United States
- Language: English

Submarine Base is a 1943 American war film directed by Albert H. Kelley for Producers Releasing Corporation. Its working title was Raiders of the Pacific.

== Plot ==
Ship engineer Jim Taggert is rescued from a torpedoed tramp steamer by Joe Morgan, an American gangster who found New York too hot for him, and has become a fisherman operating from an out-of-the-way island off of the coast of South America. Morgan makes his headquarters at the Halfway House run by the parents of Maria Styx as a bar and dance resort catering to the planters and traders of the island. Taggert finds himself practically a prisoner along with a group of American girls acting as entertainers at the resort. Taggert shadows Morgan in his activities in a remote cove and finds that Morgan is supplying German U-boat commanders with torpedoes, but does not know that Morgan has rigged the torpedoes with clock devices that explode when at sea and sinks the U-boats.

== Cast ==
- John Litel as James Xavier "Jim" Taggart
- Alan Baxter as Joe Morgan
- Eric Blore as Spike, Morgan's aide
- Georges Metaxa as Nazi Agent Anton Kroll
- George Flaherty as David Cavanaugh
- Rafael Storm as Felipo
- Fifi D'Orsay as Maria Styx
- Iris Adrian as Dorothy
- Jacqueline Dalya as Judy Pierson
- Anna Demetrio as Angela Styx
- Luis Alberni as Mr. Styx
- Lucien Prival as German Submarine Captain Mueller
