= Song of Mexico =

1945 film by James A. Fitzpatrick

- Theatrical release poster
- Directed by: James A. FitzPatrick
- Screenplay by: James A. FitzPatrick
- Produced by: James A. FitzPatrick
- Starring: Adele Mara; Edgar Barrier; George J. Lewis; Jacqueline Dalya; José Pulido; Raquel De Alva
- Cinematography: John Alton; Jorge Stahl Jr.
- Edited by: Harry Keller
- Music by: Joseph Dubin
- Production company: Republic Pictures
- Distributed by: Republic Pictures
- Release date: December 28, 1945
- Running time: 57 minutes
- Country: United States
- Language: English

Song of Mexico is a 1945 American musical film written and directed by James A. FitzPatrick and starring Adele Mara, Edgar Barrier, George J. Lewis, Jacqueline Dalya, José Pulido and Raquel De Alva. It was released on December 28, 1945, by Republic Pictures.

== Cast ==
- Adele Mara as Carol Adams
- Edgar Barrier as Gregory Davis
- George J. Lewis as Arturo Martinez
- Jacqueline Dalya as Eve Parker
- José Pulido as Ramon Carranza
- Raquel De Alva as Anita Martinez
- Margaret Falkenberg as Sarah Anderson
- Elisabeth Waldo as Elizabeth Waldo-Violinist
- Carmen Molina as Specialty Dancer
- Tipica Orchestra as Musical Ensemble
