= Carl Dentzel =

American historian and museum director (1913-1980)

Carl Schaefer Dentzel
- Born: William Carl Schaefer; March 20, 1913; Philadelphia, Pennsylvania, U.S.
- Died: August 21, 1980 (aged 67); Los Angeles, California, U.S.
- Education: Beverly Hills High School; studies in Berlin, Munich & Mexico City
- Occupation: Historian · Preservationist · Museum director · Journalist
- Employer: Southwest Museum (director)
- Known for: Director of the Southwest Museum (1955–1980); founding member and president of the Los Angeles Cultural Heritage Board
- Title: Director of the Southwest Museum
- Term: 1955–1980
- Board member of: Cultural Heritage Board of the City of Los Angeles (founding member, president), California Heritage Preservation Commission
- Spouse: Elisabeth Waldo (m. 1948)
- Children: 2
- Awards: Honorary Doctor of Humanities, Occidental College (1964)

Carl Schaefer Dentzel (March 20, 1913 – August 21, 1980) was an American historian, preservationist, and museum director who served as director of the Southwest Museum from 1955 to 1980. Under Dentzel, the museum expanded its collections and exhibits on Indigenous peoples of the Americas and the Hispanic Southwest.

== Early life and career ==
William Carl Schaefer was born on March 20, 1913, in Philadelphia, Pennsylvania to William Carl Schaefer (an insurance broker who died of influenza in 1918) and Emma Wagner Schaefer. His stepfather, Edward P. Dentzel, whose name Schaefer adopted, was a councilman and later the mayor of Beverly Hills, while his mother, Emma (Wagner) Dentzel, played a key role in establishing the city's park system. He attended Beverly Hills High School and later pursued studies abroad in Berlin, Munich, and Mexico City before embarking on a career in journalism.

From 1933 to 1936, Dentzel worked as a news correspondent, reporting from Europe and Asia. His travels took him across multiple continents before he returned to Southern California in 1940. He lived in the northwestern part of the San Fernando Valley (then known as Zelzah and North Los Angeles), where he became involved in local cultural initiatives.

During World War II, Dentzel worked with the Office of Inter-American Affairs, which led to his appointment as executive secretary of the Southern California Council of Inter-American Affairs in the late 1940s. He later became editor and writer for the Northridge Herald and served as president of the Northridge Chamber of Commerce.

Dentzel was focused on preserving Native American, Spanish, and Mexican heritage, especially in the American Southwest. He frequently wrote and spoke about strengthening ties between the United States and Latin America, particularly during times of political instability in the region.

== Southwest Museum leadership ==
Dentzel was appointed director of the Southwest Museum in 1955 and remained in the position until 1980. Under his leadership, the museum expanded its collections, exhibits, and library to encompass the history and culture of Indigenous peoples from North, Central, and South America. During his tenure, the museum organized research projects, exhibitions, and international exchanges. A 1962 Los Angeles Times article noted that the museum had expanded its collections while retaining its traditional appearance. However, some of the exhibitions and programs he commissioned were controversial, especially in regard to Native American artifacts.

== Advocacy and preservation efforts ==
An advocate for historic preservation, Dentzel was a founding member of the Cultural Heritage Board of the City of Los Angeles, serving as its president from 1968 until his death in 1980. As president of the Cultural Heritage Board, Dentzel participated in efforts to designate and preserve historic landmarks in Los Angeles and Southern California. He also worked to promote cultural activities, aesthetic considerations in urban planning, and community learning opportunities over the sometimes competing interests of the business community. His work on the Cultural Heritage Board, however, was not free from criticism and charges of favoritism in the distribution of historical monuments throughout the city.

Dentzel also served on the California Heritage Preservation Commission and was an active member of the Commission of the Californias. In that role, he supported cultural exchanges between California and Mexico.

== Scholarship and collections ==
Dentzel was a writer and editor, contributing to publications on the history of Mexico, Central and South America, and the American Southwest. He was also a public speaker, who often gave presentations on the cultural contributions of diverse ethnic groups in the region.

Along with the artifacts which he acquired for the Southwest Museum, Dentzel was also a personal collector of the art, artifacts, and cultural heritage of the American Southwest. He referred to himself as an "Americanist," in that he believed that the region’s artistic traditions, rooted in the blending of Spanish colonial and Indigenous influences, formed the foundation of a uniquely American artistic identity. His collections emphasized the significance of ceramics, weaving, painting, and metalwork developed over centuries in the Southwest United States, primarily in the Rio Grande Valley. Dentzel's interest in preserving history extended beyond art and artifacts, as seen in his donation of what are believed to be the first-ever photographs of Yosemite Valley to the UCLA Library, and his donation of a trove of historical photographs to the Huntington Library. He also donated, as a bequest after his death, a "major collection of Western paintings" to the Southwest Museum.

== Affiliations and recognitions ==
Dentzel served as president of the Zamorano Club, Sheriff of the Westerners (Los Angeles Corral), and played a role in the Western Museum Conference of the American Association of Museums and the Museum Alliance of the Natural History Museum of Los Angeles County.

Occidental College awarded Dentzel an honorary Doctor of Humanities degree in 1964. He was also a Fellow of the California Historical Society.

== Preservation and cultural work ==
Dentzel's international engagements included hosting and meeting with governors of Mexico and Baja California and an invitation to visit the private museum of the Emperor of Japan in 1979.

Dentzel participated in the process of naming the Northridge community in Los Angeles, where he resided with his wife and children for many years.

== Archival collections ==
Dentzel's archives are held in the University Library at California State University, Northridge.

== Personal life and death ==
Dentzel was married to violinist Elisabeth Waldo for 32 years; the couple had two children. He died on August 21, 1980, aged 67, in Los Angeles, California.
