= Wabash Avenue (film) =

1950 American musical film directed by Henry Koster

- Directed by: Henry Koster
- Written by: Charles Lederer; Harry Tugend
- Produced by: William Perlberg
- Starring: Betty Grable; Victor Mature; Phil Harris
- Cinematography: Arthur E. Arling
- Edited by: Robert L. Simpson
- Music by: Cyril J. Mockridge
- Color process: Technicolor
- Distributed by: 20th Century Fox
- Release dates: March 31, 1950 (Chicago, Illinois)
- Running time: 92 minutes
- Country: United States
- Language: English
- Box office: $2,050,000 (US rentals)

Wabash Avenue is a 1950 American musical film directed by Henry Koster and starring Betty Grable and Victor Mature. The film was a remake of Grable's earlier hit 1943 film Coney Island.

== Plot ==
Ruby Summers (Betty Grable) is a burlesque queen in a successful dance hall in 1892 Chicago. The owner of the dance hall Mike (Phil Harris) has cheated his ex-partner Andy Clark (Victor Mature) out of a half interest in the business. Andy schemes to potentially ruin Mike and also hopes to make Ruby a classy entertainer, as well as his own girl.

== Cast ==
- Betty Grable as Ruby Summers
- Victor Mature as Andy Clark
- Phil Harris as Mike Stanley
- Reginald Gardiner as English Eddie
- James Barton as Harrigan
- Barry Kelley as Bouncer
- Margaret Hamilton as Tillie Hutch
- Jacqueline Dalya as Cleo
- Robin Raymond as Jennie
- Hal K. Dawson as Healy
- Dorothy Neumann as Reformer
- Alexander Pope as Charlie Saxe
- Henry Kulky as Joe Barton
- Marie Bryant as Elsa
- Collette Lyons as Beulah
- George Beranger as Wax Museum Attendant

== Background ==
Wabash Avenue, named from a major Chicago street, was reportedly conceived as a biopic of Chicago songwriter Gus Kahn. Negotiations dissolved but exhibitors had been promised that title so 20th Century Fox hastily substituted a rewrite of its 1943 Coney Island. (The Kahn biopic was made at Warner Bros. in 1951 as I'll See You in My Dreams, with Danny Thomas as Kahn.)

The film became a vehicle for Betty Grable with Richard Widmark and Paul Douglas to co-star. The setting was to be the 1893 Chicago Exposition. Eventually Widmark was replaced by Victor Mature and Douglas by Phil Harris.

Filming started on May 9, 1949. It was the first in a three-picture contract Koster had with Fox.The film featured five new numbers in addition to some old favourites. 87 sets were constructed included a recreation of Wabash Avenue.Grable enjoyed working with director Henry Koster so much she insisted he direct her next film, My Blue Heaven.

== Awards ==
Wabash Avenue also received an Academy Award nomination for Best Original Song for the number Wilhelmina.
