= Los Angeles Historic-Cultural Monument =

Municipal landmark designation

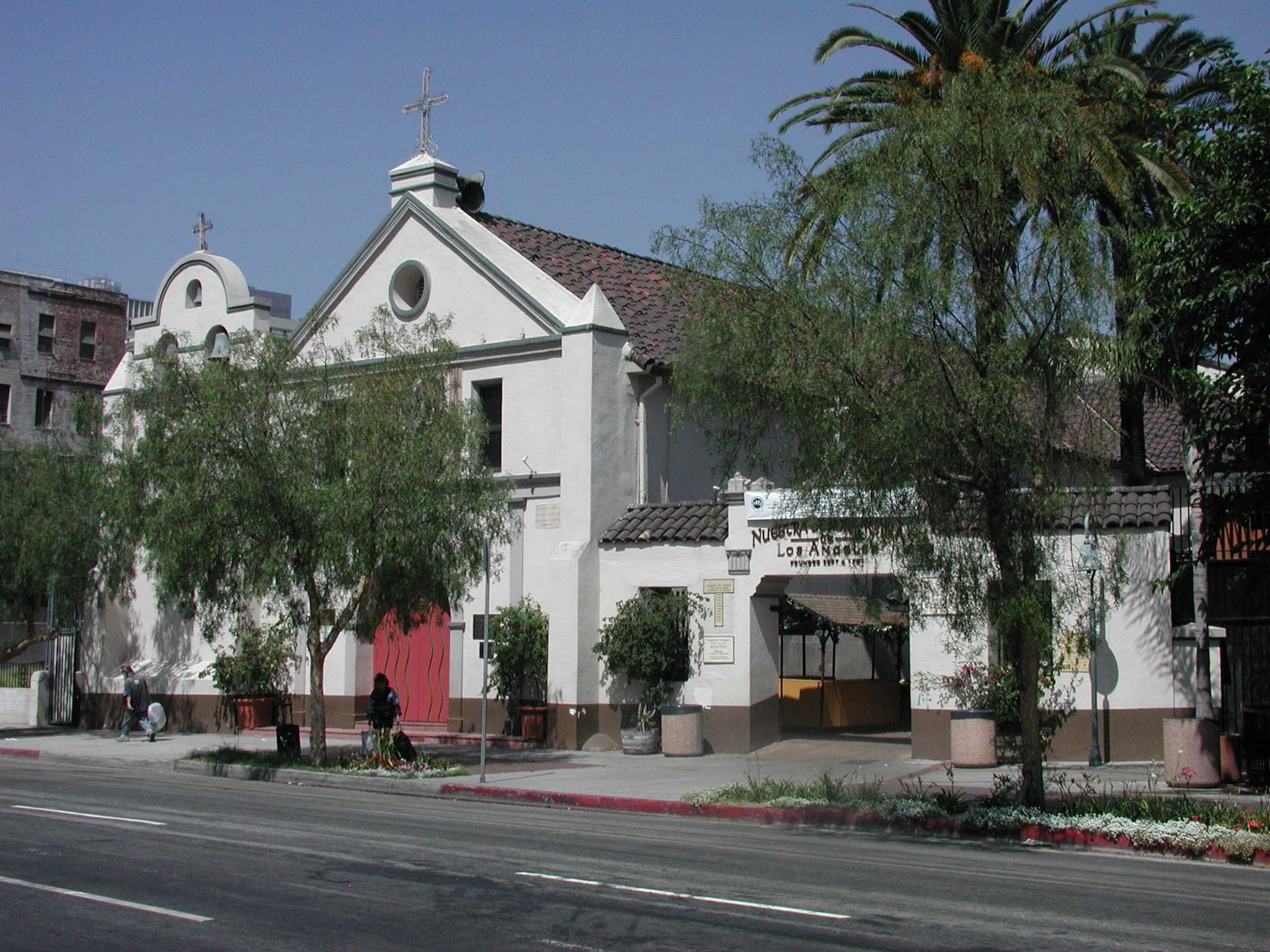
La Iglesia de Nuestra Señora la Reina de los Ángeles, one of the first Los Angeles Historic-Cultural Monuments that were designated in 1962

Los Angeles Historic-Cultural Monuments are sites which have been designated by the Los Angeles, California, Cultural Heritage Commission as worthy of preservation based on architectural, historic and cultural criteria.

== History ==
The Historic-Cultural Monument process has its origin in the Historic Buildings Committee formed in 1958 by the Los Angeles chapter of the American Institute of Architects. As growth and development in Los Angeles threatened the city's historic landmarks, the committee sought to implement a formal preservation program in cooperation with local civic, cultural and business organizations and municipal leaders. On April 30, 1962, a historic preservation ordinance proposed by the AIA committee was passed.

The original Cultural Heritage Board (later renamed a commission) was formed in the summer of 1962, consisting of William Woollett, FAIA, Bonnie H. Riedel, Carl S. Dentzel, Senaida Sullivan and Edith Gibbs Vaughan.

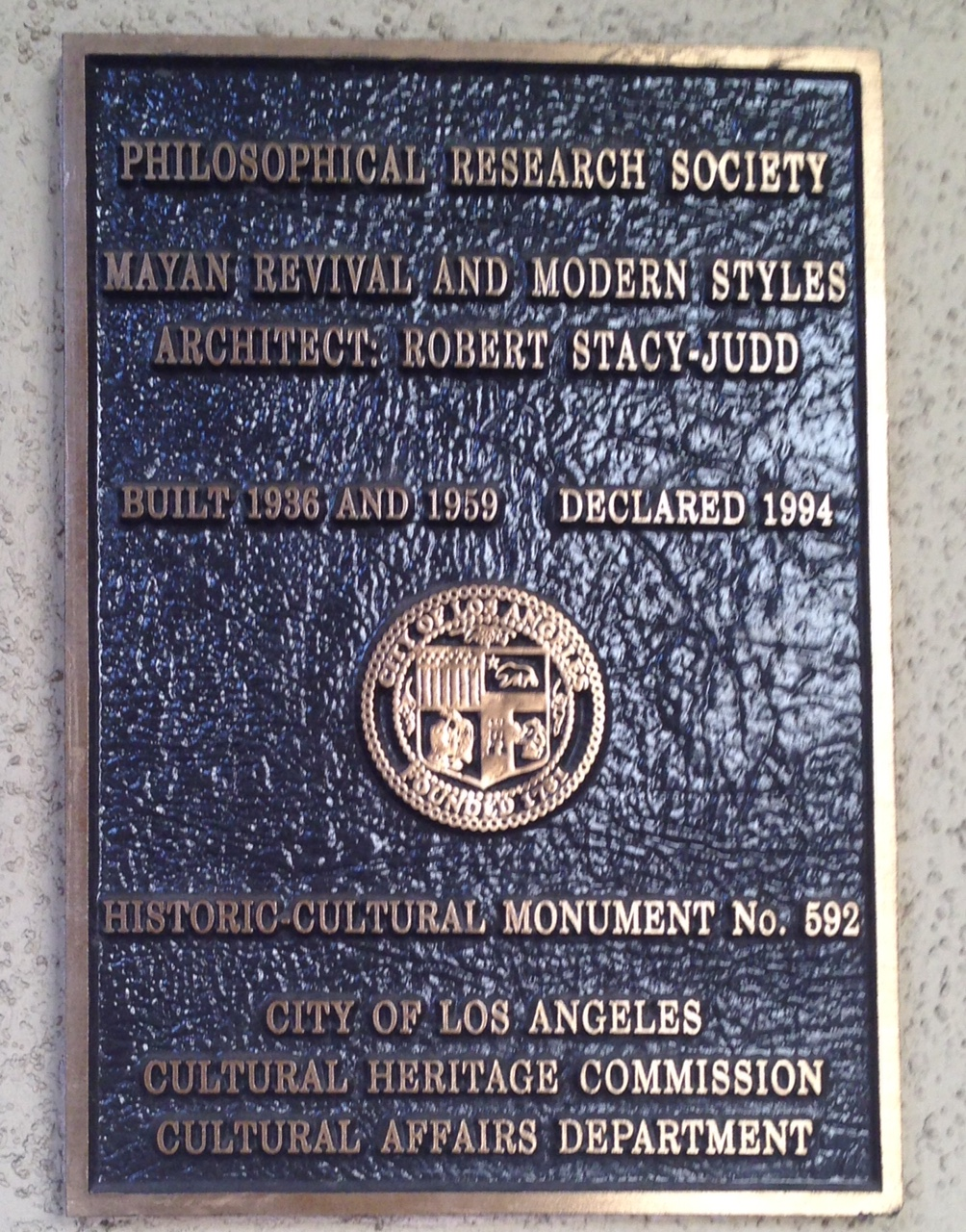
Designation plaque at the Philosophical Research Society, HCM No. 592

The board met for the first time in August 1962, at a time when the owner of the historic Leonis Adobe was attempting to demolish the structure and replace it with a supermarket. In its first day of official business, the board designated the Leonis Adobe and four other sites as Historic-Cultural Monuments.

In the commission's first decade of operation (August 1962 – August 1972), it designated 101 properties as Historic-Cultural Monuments. By April 2018, there were over 1150 designated properties. As of 2025, that number rose to more than 1300.

Although women played a critical role in the architectural landscape of Los Angeles as well as historic preservation efforts, fewer than 2% of the recognized properties recognize the contribution of women. In 2024, the L.A. Women's Landmarks Project was created as a partnership between the National Trust's Where Women Made History initiative and the Los Angeles Conservancy to recognize the forgotten women of LA historical preservation.

== Process ==
The designation of a property as a Historic-Cultural Monument does not prevent demolition or alteration. However, the designation requires permits for demolition or substantial alteration to be presented to the commission. The commission has the power to delay the demolition of a designated property for up to one year.

== Gallery ==
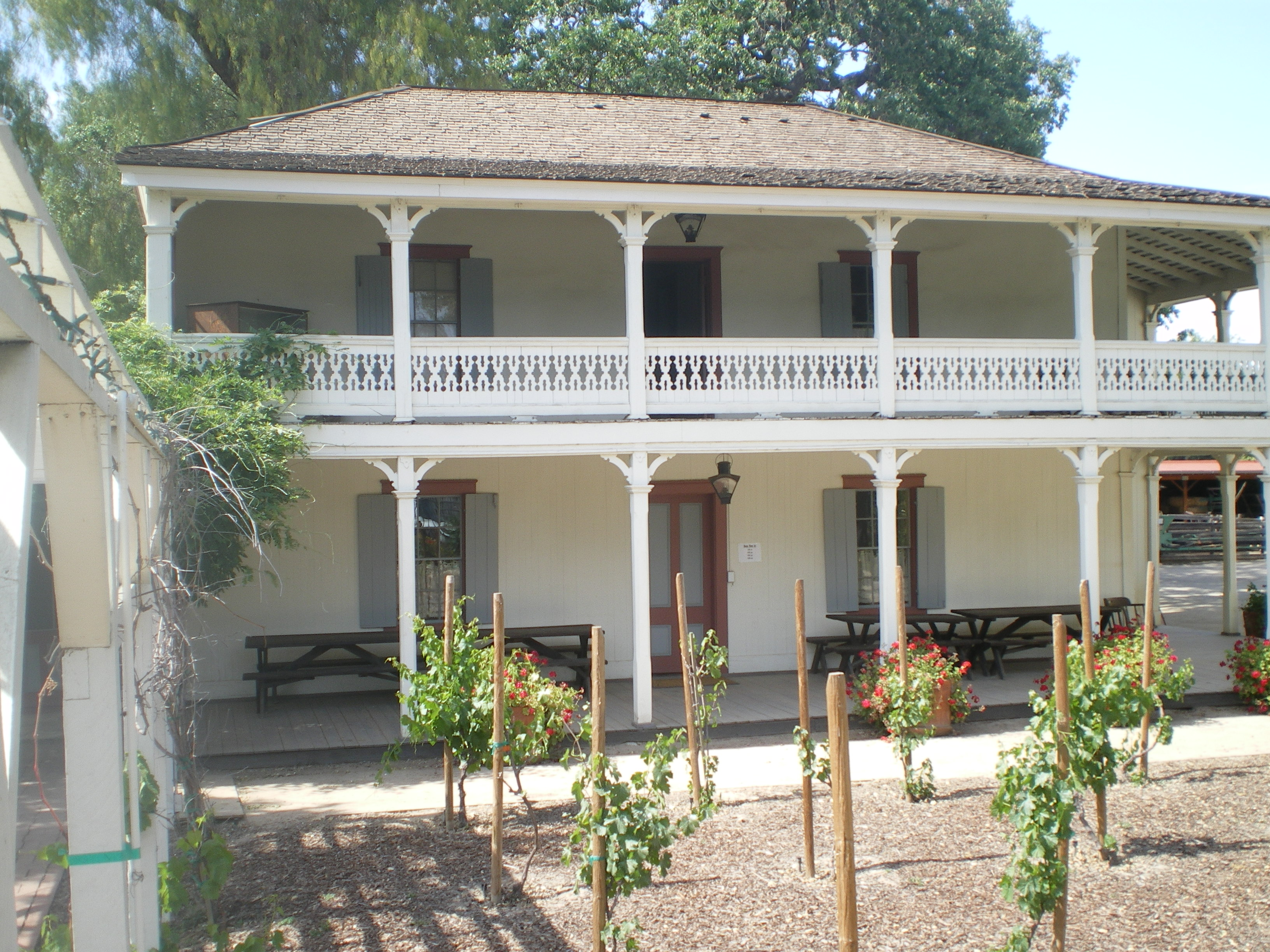
Leonis Adobe (HCM #1)

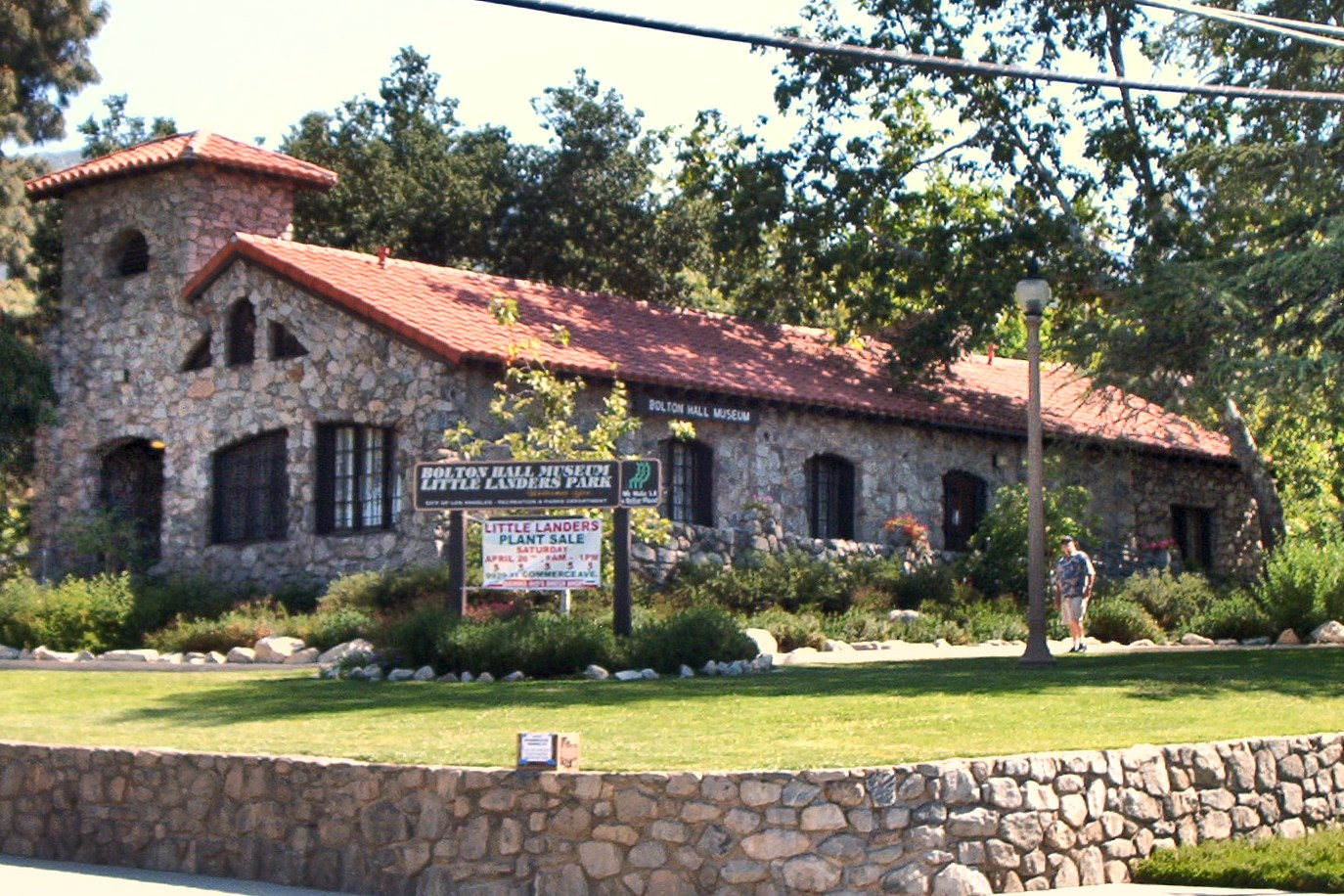
Bolton Hall (HCM #2)

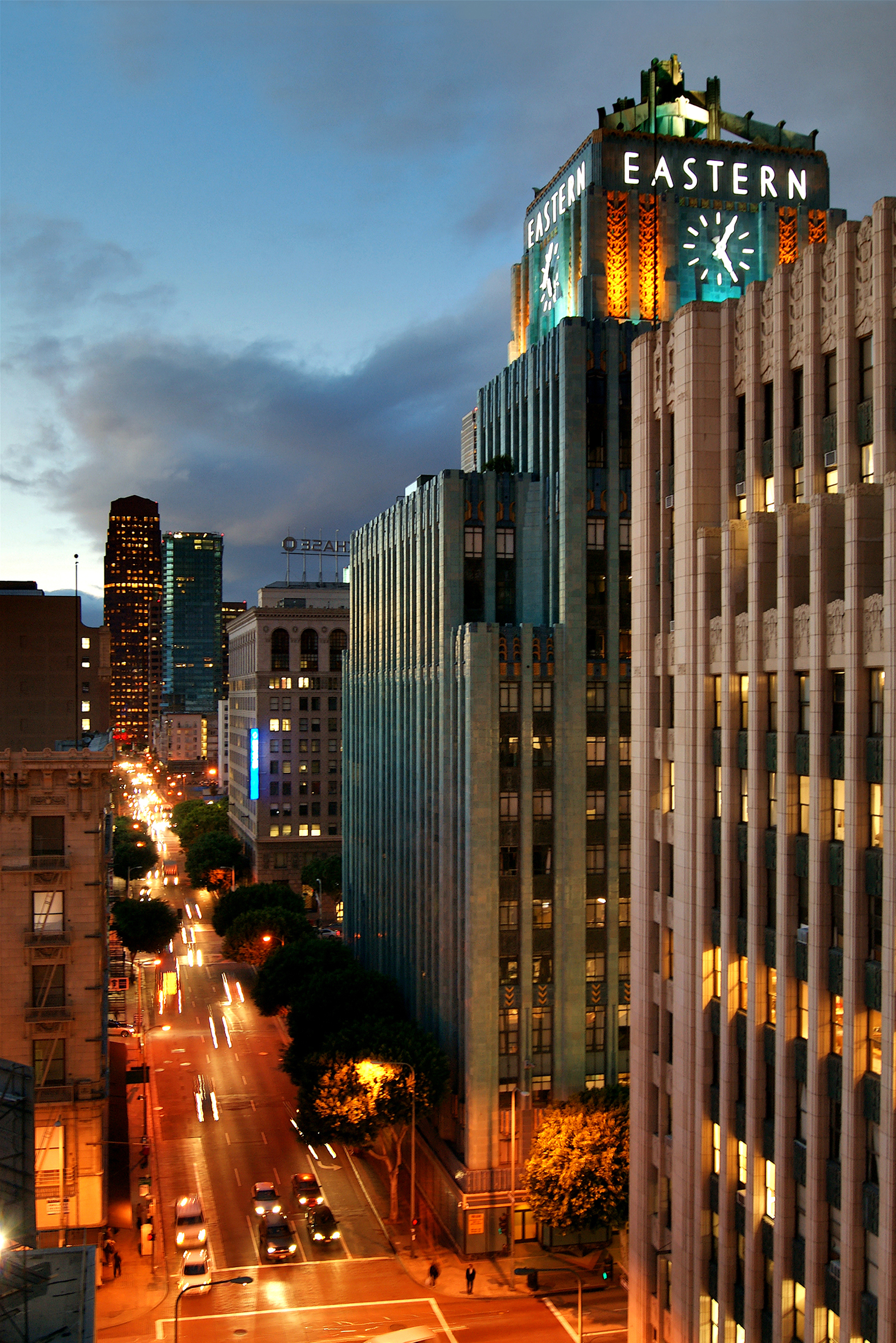
Eastern Columbia Building (HCM #294)

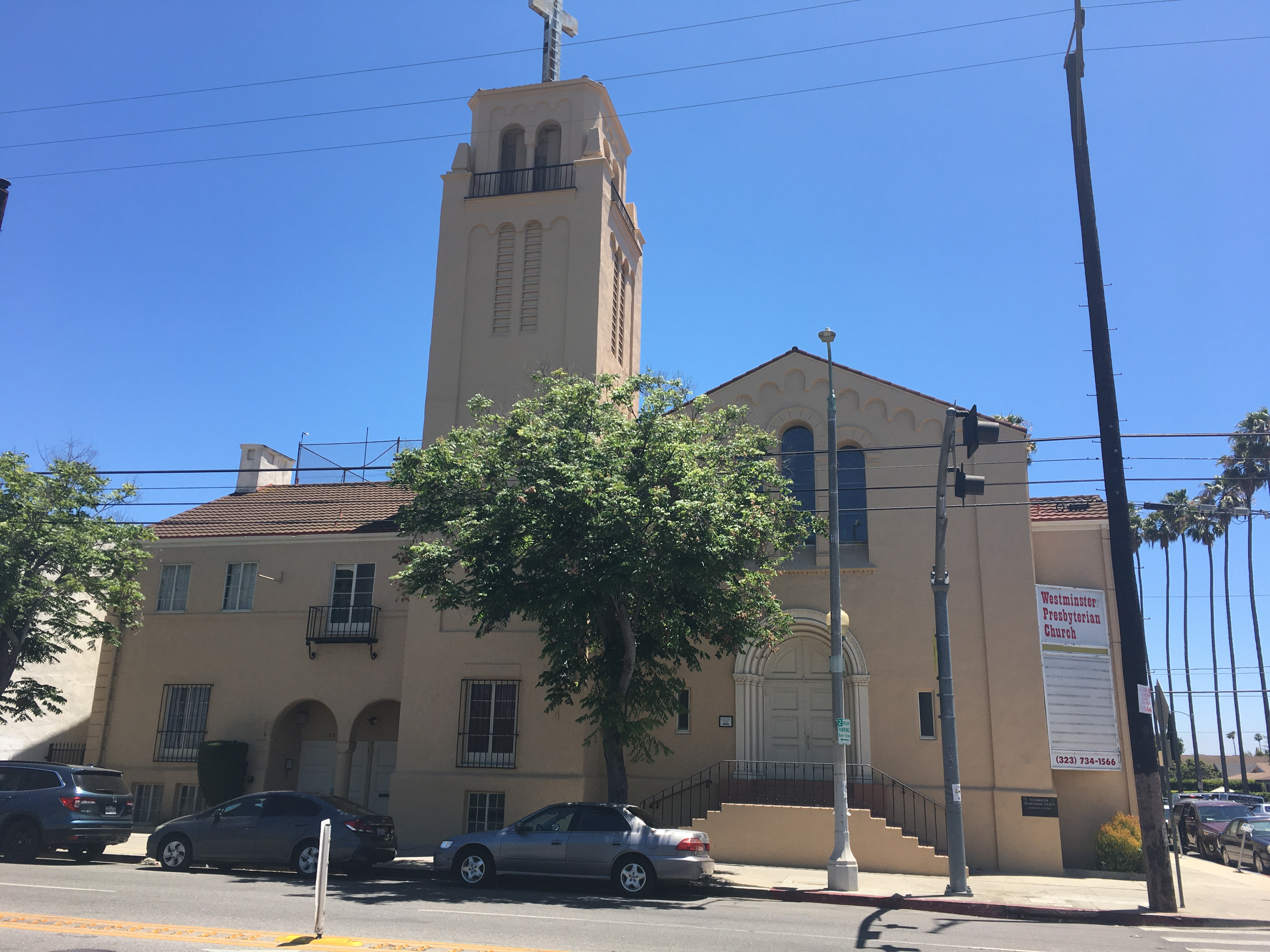
Westminster Presbyterian Church (Los Angeles) (HCM #299)

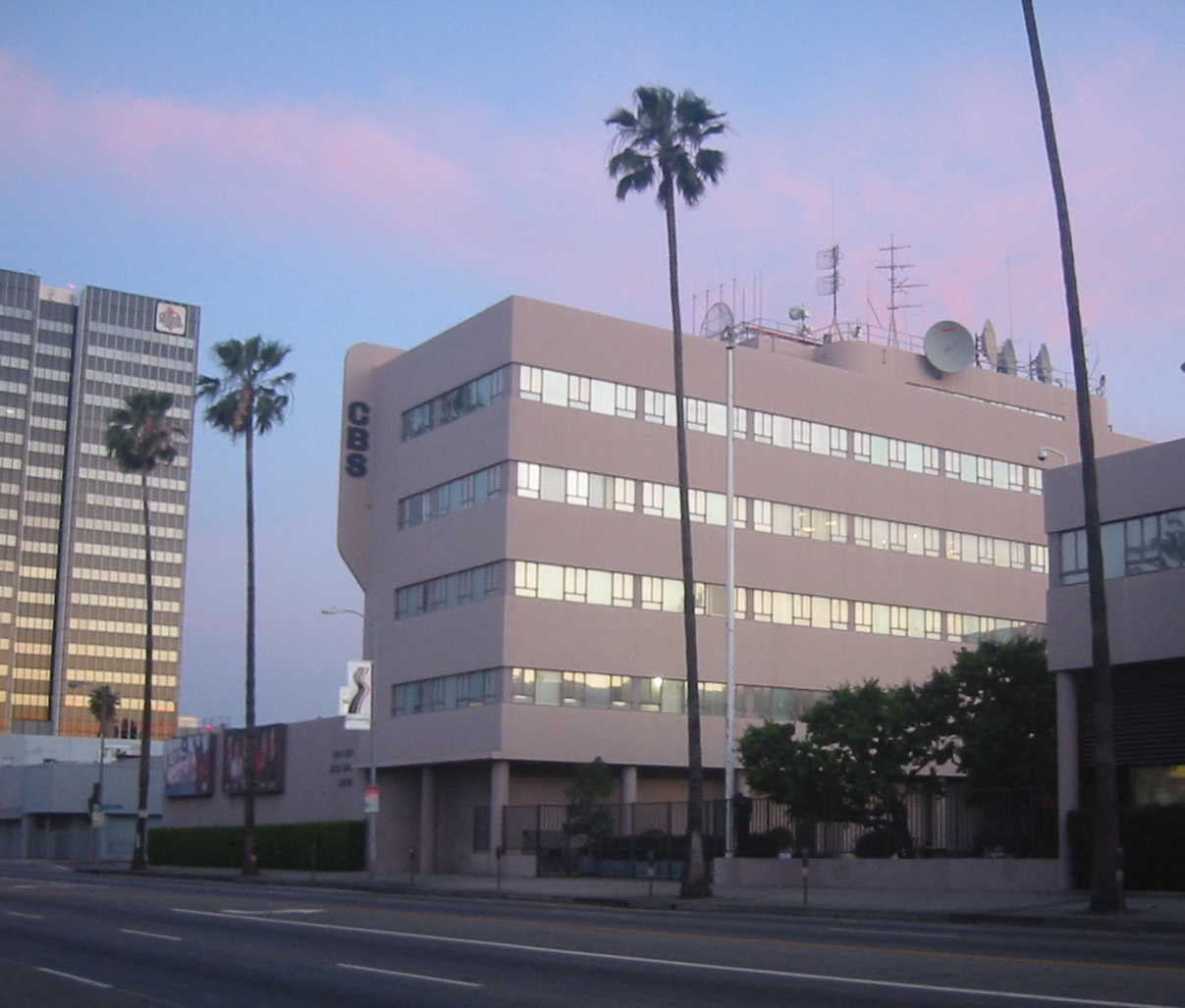
CBS Columbia Square Studios (HCM #947)

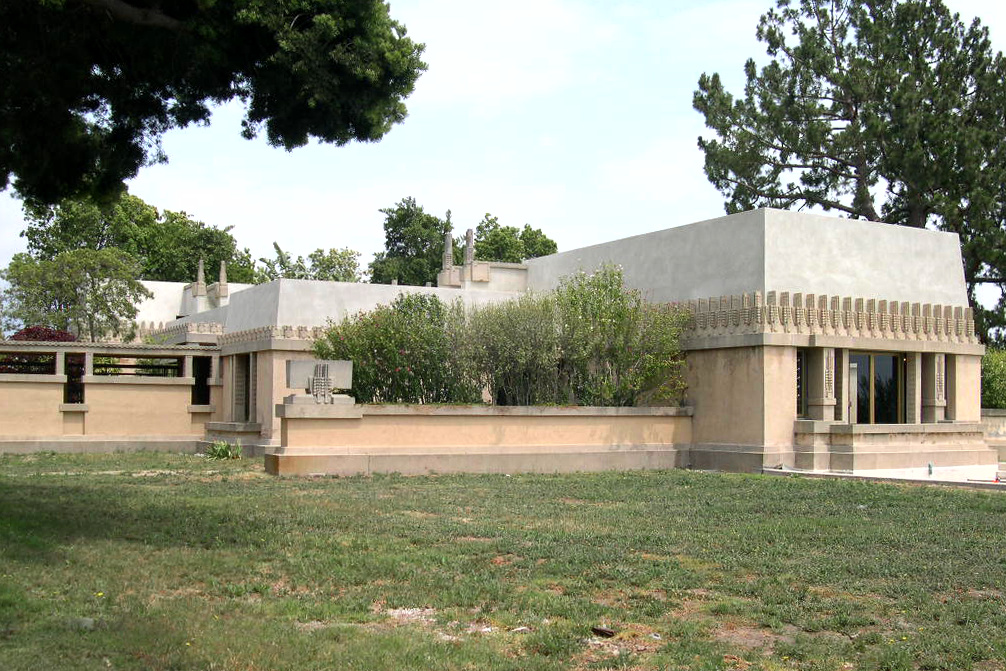
Hollyhock House

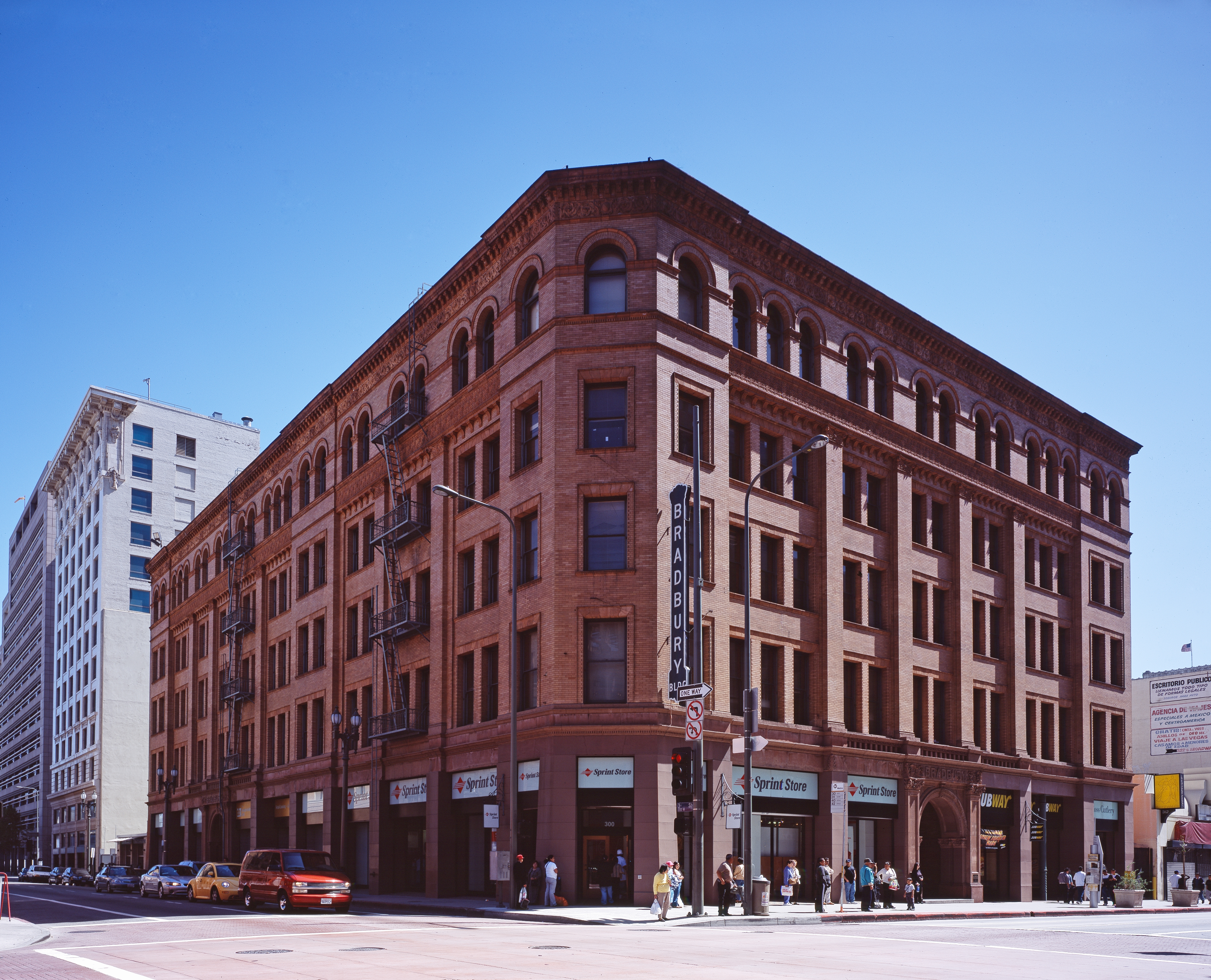
Bradbury Building

== Designated LAHCM outside the City of Los Angeles ==
HCM #	Landmark name	Image	Date designated	Locality	Area	Description
160	Manzanar		September 15, 1976	Highway 395; 36°43′42″N 118°9′16″W	Inyo County, California	Japanese American internment site, World War II. Located at the foot of the Sierra Nevada in the Owens Valley. Land was owned by the Los Angeles Department of Water and Power when the US Government leased it for the Manzanar concentration camp.

== Lists of L.A. Historic-Cultural Monuments ==
- Historic-Cultural Monuments in Downtown Los Angeles
- Historic-Cultural Monuments on the East and Northeast Sides
- Historic-Cultural Monuments in the Harbor area
- Historic-Cultural Monuments in Hollywood
- Historic-Cultural Monuments in the San Fernando Valley
- Historic-Cultural Monuments in Silver Lake, Angelino Heights, and Echo Park
- Historic-Cultural Monuments in South Los Angeles
- Historic-Cultural Monuments on the Westside
- Historic-Cultural Monuments in the Wilshire and Westlake areas

== See also ==
- City of Los Angeles' Historic Preservation Overlay Zones
- National Register of Historic Places listings in Los Angeles
- List of California Historical Landmarks
