= Blood Mania =

1970 film

- Theatrical poster
- Directed by: Robert Vincent O'Neil
- Screenplay by: Toby Sacher; Tony Crechales
- Story by: Peter Carpenter
- Produced by: Peter Carpenter; Chris Marconi
- Starring: Peter Carpenter; Maria De Aragon; Vicki Peters; Reagan Wilson; Jacqueline Dalya
- Cinematography: Robert Maxwell; Gary Graver
- Edited by: Patrick Kennedy
- Music by: Don Vincent
- Production company: Jude Associates
- Distributed by: Crown International Pictures
- Release date: October 28, 1970
- Running time: 80 minutes
- Country: United States
- Language: English

Blood Mania is a 1970 American horror film written by Peter Carpenter and Tony Crechales and directed by Robert Vincent O'Neil, and starring Carpenter, Maria De Aragon, Vicki Peters, Reagan Wilson, Jacqueline Dalya, and Alex Rocco. The film stars Carpenter as a doctor whose mistress, an heiress, murders her terminally ill father to help him pay off a debt.

Released in the fall of 1970, the film would go on to be featured as a double bill with 1961's Bloodlust!. According to star Vicki Peters, the house the film was shot in was formerly owned by Bela Lugosi.

== Plot ==
Dr. Craig Cooper, a physician, is caring for his dying employer, Ridgeley Waterman. A wealthy old curmudgeon, Waterman is cared for at home by his daughter Victoria, and a live-in nurse, Miss Turner. Despite several attempts by Victoria, a nymphomaniac, to seduce Dr. Cooper, she has so far been unsuccessful. Dr. Cooper soon learns that an unnamed old connection is attempting to blackmail him for his providing of illegal abortions. The blackmailer is demanding $50,000 in hush money. During one of his house calls to examine Victoria's father, Dr. Cooper expresses to Victoria that he is suffering "tax" problems. She tells him that she can acquire the money, and seduces him. Their affair consummated, Victoria proceeds to poison and kill her father with the motive of paying Dr. Cooper's debt with her father's estate.

With Dr. Cooper's assistance, Victoria avoids suspicion (Cooper rules the death a stroke) and her estranged younger sister Gail returns from New York City for the reading of their father's will. With Gail is Kate, a middle-aged woman who lives with Gail, and who has an unspoken, unreciprocated sexual interest in her. The group meet for the reading of the will by the family lawyer, and much to Victoria's surprise, Gail is the primary beneficiary of the estate. The will leaves Victoria only with the use of her deceased father's house and a small living allowance. Distraught, she becomes bedridden.

While caring for Victoria, Dr. Cooper learns of Gale's new status as a wealthy heiress, and begins seducing her. When Kate realizes Gail and Dr. Cooper have begun a relationship, she dejectedly packs her things and returns to New York.

After spending an evening out with Dr. Cooper, Gail returns home, and offers to split the estate with Victoria, who refuses. Gail reveals that she has already offered to help Dr. Cooper with his "tax" issues, and Victoria learns of the budding relationship between her lover and her younger sister. She bludgeons Gail to death with a lamp in the bathroom. Dr. Cooper soon returns to the house and finds Gail dead, with Victoria stoically painting a canvas in the next room with her sister's blood. In the bathroom, he finds Gail's corpse in the shower. Attempting to help cover up the crime, he carries Gail's body to the car, placing it in the trunk.

Returning to the house, Dr. Cooper embraces Victoria just as she sees Gail's corpse standing behind the door. It falls, revealing Dr. Cooper's blackmailer, grinning menacingly as the painting is revealed, showing Dr. Cooper with a skeleton draped across his arms.

== Cast ==
- Peter Carpenter as Dr. Craig Cooper
- Maria De Aragon as Victoria Waterman
- Vicki Peters as Gail Waterman
- Reagan Wilson as Cheryl
- Jacqueline Dalya as Kate
- Leslie Simms as Nurse Turner
- Alex Rocco as Lawyer
- Eric Allison as Ridgely Waterman
- Arell Blanton as Blackmailer
- Reid Smith as Pool Boy

== Production ==
Blood Mania was shot over a period of twelve days in Los Angeles, California; director Robert Vincent O'Neill, originally a props master, had begun directing after working as the props head on Easy Rider (1969), and became involved with the project after the original director dropped out of the production shortly before shooting began. According to star Vicki Peters, the house the film was shot in was formerly owned by Bela Lugosi.

Commenting on the shoot, production manager Gary Kent said: "Robert was a prop man to begin with. I had no idea he was a director. The next thing I knew he was doing it, and he called me in as a production manager. It was fun. He took it seriously, so you never got the feeling he was just in it for the bucks. I thought it just took him forever to get a shot. He was always fussing over it. It was murder. His movies were long and arduous, but nonetheless I had some affection for Robert."

== Release ==
=== Television cut ===
According to star Leslie Simms, a year after production had commenced, she was called back to complete re-shoots for an alternate cut of the film intended for television broadcast. In order for the film to be shown on cable television, the nudity and violence had to be excised from the theatrical version. In order to remedy this, a subplot was introduced which had Nurse Turner in cahoots with the blackmailer; in place of the murder sequences, new footage was shot in which Nurse Turner reports her witnessing of the murders to the blackmailer.

=== Critical response ===
Michael Bate of the Ottawa Citizen compared the film to a soap opera, writing that "by skimming over the film's few tense moments, director Robert O'Neill fails to inject his work with any sense of terror." Kevin Thomas of the Los Angeles Times deemed the film a "glum and tedious exercise," though he praised the cinematography for providing a "rich, sensuous look" and also noted the "eerie score."

Scott Weinberg of eFilmcritic.com gave the film a negative review, calling it "stunningly drab" and noting that it offers "nothing more than three or four gauzy love scenes offset by a nonstop deluge of "Let's kill so and so for his fortune" schpiel. I instantly and involuntarily tuned out every time the characters spoke."

=== Home media ===
Blood Mania was released in super 8 and as a double feature DVD by Code Red, paired with Land of the Minotaur, in 2012. On January 31, 2017, the film was released as a double feature on DVD and Blu-ray with Point of Terror (1971), also starring Carpenter, by Vinegar Syndrome. The first 3,000 units of the release also feature a bonus disc containing the television cuts of each film. The film was also included in Mill Creek Entertainment's "200 Drive-In Cult Cinema" DVD Collection in 2013.

== Sources ==
- Albright, Brian (2008). Wild Beyond Belief!: Interviews with Exploitation Filmmakers of the 1960s and 1970s. McFarland. ISBN 978-0-786-43689-7.
- McCarty, John (November 4, 2016). The Official Splatter Movie Guide, Volumes: 1963-1992: Hundreds of the Goriest, Grossest, Most Outrageous Films Ever Made. Crossroad Press. ASIN B01MSHM7LI.
