= James A. FitzPatrick =

American film director (1894–1980)

James Anthony FitzPatrick (February 26, 1894 – June 12, 1980) was an American producer, director, writer and narrator known from the early 1930s as "The Voice of the Globe" for his Fitzpatrick's Traveltalks.

== Biography ==
One of FitzPatrick's Travel Talks shorts, this one about Seoul, Korea in 1931.

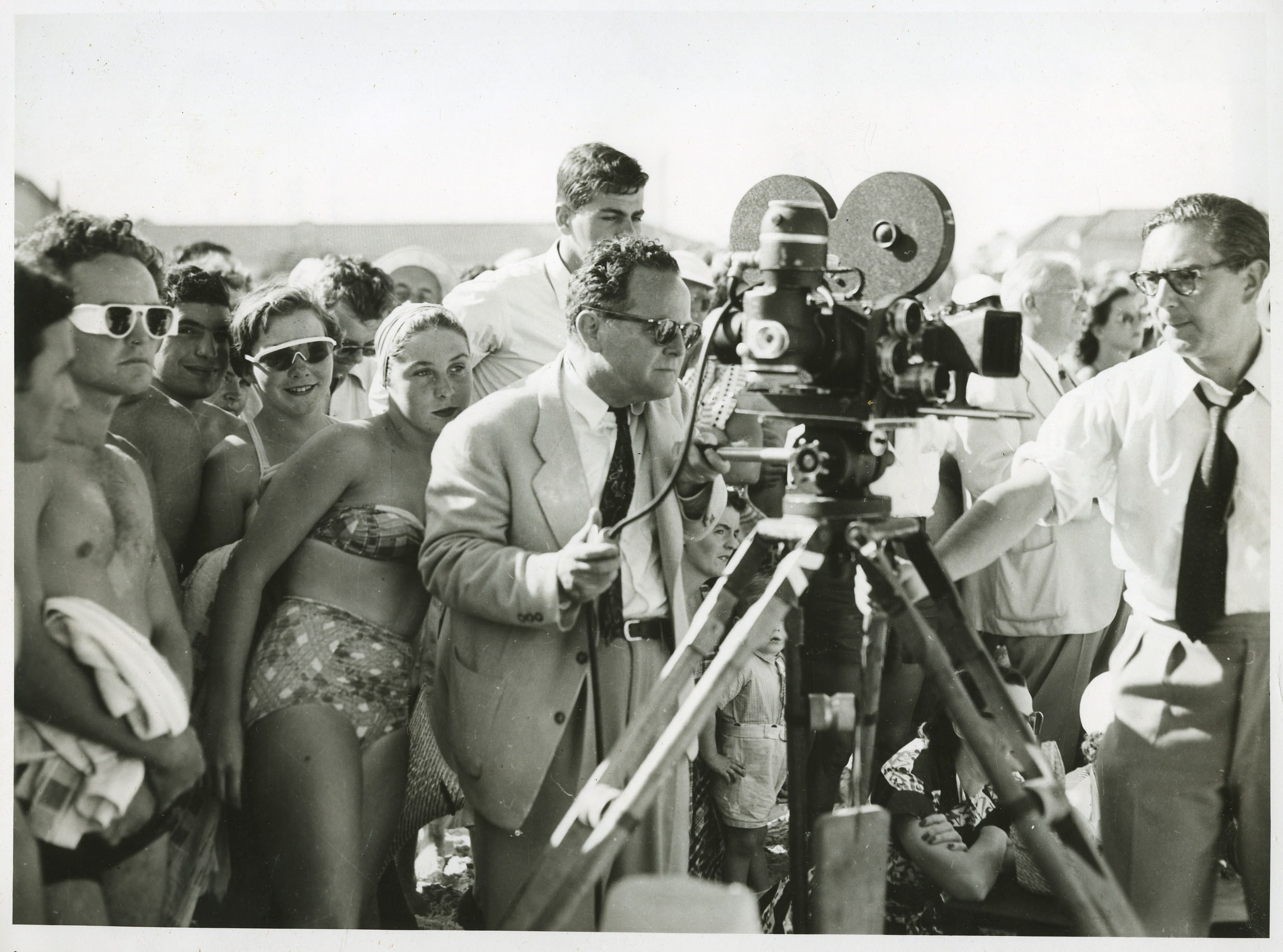
James FitzPatrick, a camera crew and a crowd at Bondi Beach, Australia, in 1951.

James Anthony FitzPatrick was born in Shelton, Connecticut. After completing training in dramatic arts, he worked as a journalist.

In 1916, he began his film career by starting the Juvenile Film Company in Cleveland, producing comedy shorts featuring children, years before similar series such as Our Gang and The Little Rascals. The series was not a success, and by 1921 FitzPatrick was working as a writer/director for Charles Urban's Kineto Company of America, working on a series titled Great American Authors that featured profiles of famous American writers.

Kineto folded in 1924, and in 1925 FitzPatrick established his own company and began two concurrent series: Famous Music Masters—dramatized shorts about the lives of famous composers—and Songs Of. The films were distributed worldwide, and some were later synchronized to sound.

In July 1929, FitzPatrick began filming travel documentaries for British and American markets, and was presented to movie theaters by the following year. Metro-Goldwyn-Mayer distributed the series under the title FitzPatrick Traveltalks. Beginning with 1934's Holland in Tulip Time, the Traveltalks were filmed in Technicolor, and the series was among the earliest regular vehicles for color film in the American film industry. After FitzPatrick left MGM in 1954, he produced a similar series for Paramount Pictures titled VistaVision Visits for another year before retiring.

FitzPatrick died at the age of 86 in Cathedral City, California.

== Legacy ==
FitzPatrick created nearly 300 films in a career that spanned five decades. His approach was somewhat similar to that of Charles Urban in that his travelogues concentrated on architecture and landscape rather than on people. FitzPatrick also relates to Urban in his advocacy of color, which he first employed in Charles Gounod (1928), a film in the Famous Music Master series.

With the advent of television, Hollywood began to reduce its reliance on short subjects, and many shorts departments began to close. FitzPatrick owned his own unit and managed to survive longer than did many internal studio units. FitzPatrick Pictures produced only five features, three of which were intended for release only in the UK. The last film, Song of Mexico (1945), was released by Republic Pictures.

The Traveltalks films are often shown on the Turner Classic Movies channel as filler material between features.

On his 1958 Parlophone record The Best of Sellers, Peter Sellers performed "Balham, Gateway to the South", a parody of Fitzpatrick's travelogues. A short film version of this was released in 1980 by Robbie Coltrane.

In 1960, FitzPatrick was awarded a star on the Hollywood Walk of Fame.

== Selected filmography ==
- Songs of Ireland (1926)
- In Old Madrid (1929)
- Hong Kong, China (1930)
- Valencia to Granada (1930)
- Granada to Toledo (1930) (Sequel to Valencia to Granada)
- Sunny Spain (1930)
- India (1930)
- China, the Imperial City (1930)
- Japan, the Island Empire (1930)
- Japan in Cherry Blossom Time (1930)
- Dublin and Nearby (1930)
- Siam to Korea (1931)
- Java (1931)
- Land of the Maharajahs (1931)
- Benares (1931)
- Honolulu to Havana (1931)
- Temple of Love (1931)
- Bali, Island of Paradise (1932)
- Cradles of Creed (1932)
- Tropical Ceylon (1932)
- Benares, the Hindu Heaven (1932)
- Colorful Jaipur (1932)
- Borneo (1932)
- Romantic Argentine (1932)
- The World Dances (1932)
- The Big Ditch of Panama (1933)
- Moscow, Heart of Russia (1933)
- Iceland, Land of the Vikings (1933)
- Norway, the Land of the Midnight Sun (1933)
- Scotland the Bonnie (1933)
- Fiji and Samoa (1933)
- Daughters of the Sea (1933)
- Dutch Guiana (1933)
- A Day in Venice (1933)
- Colorful Ports of Call (1934)
- British Guiana (1934) (Sequel to Dutch Guiana)
- Tibet, Land of Isolation (1934)
- Italy, Land of Inspiration (1934)
- Citadels of the Mediterranean (1934)
- Glimpses of Erin (1934)
- New Zealand, White Man's Paradise (1934)
- Egypt, Kingdom of the Nile (1934)
- Cruising the South Seas (1934)
- Holland in Tulip Time (1934) (First Technicolor short)
- Switzerland The Beautiful (1934)
- Zion, Canyon of Colour (1934)
- Ireland: The Emerald Isle (1934)
- Zeeland: The Hidden Paradise (1934)
- Colorful Guatemala (1935)
- Modern Tokyo (1935)
- Los Angeles: Wonder City of the West (1935)
- Beautiful Banff and Lake Louise (1935)
- Honolulu: The Paradise of the Pacific (1935)
- Memories and Melodies (1935)
- Sacred City of the Mayan Indians (Chichicastenango, Guatemala), (1936)
- Rio de Janeiro: City of Splendour (1936)
- Quaint Québec (1936)
- Yellowstone Park: Nature's Playground (1936)
- Victoria and Vancouver: Gateways to Canada (1936)
- Cherry Blossom Time in Japan (1936) (Sequel to Japan in Cherry Blossom Time)
- Oriental Paradise (1936)
- Picturesque South Africa (1937)
- India on Parade (1937)
- Glimpses of Java and Ceylon (1937)
- Colorful Bombay (1937)
- Hong Kong: The Hub of the Orient (1937)
- Serene Siam (1937)
- Rocky Mountain Grandeur (1937)
- Floral Japan (1937)
- Glimpses of Peru (1937)
- Stockholm: Pride of Sweden (1937)
- Chile: Land of Charm (1937)
- Copenhagen (1937)
- Glimpses of Austria (1938)
- Beautiful Budapest (1938)
- Czechoslovakia on Parade (1938)
- Paris on Parade (1938) Exposition Internationale des Arts et Techniques dans la Vie Moderne
- Cairo: City of Contrast (1938)
- Madeira: Isle of Romance (1938)
- Ancient Egypt (1939)
- Imperial Delhi (1939)
- Java Journey (1939)
- Rural Hungary (1939)
- Picturesque Udaipur (1939)
- Colorful Curacao (1939)
- Old Natchez on the Mississippi (1939)
- Night Descends on Treasure Island (1940) Golden Gate International Exposition
- Seattle: Gateway to the Northwest (1940)
- Calling on Colombia (1940)
- Modern New Orleans (1940)
- Suva: Pride of Fiji (1940)
- Old New Mexico (1940)
- Old New Orleans (1940)
- Glimpses of Mexico (1940)
- The Capital City: Washington D.C. (1940)
- Cavalcade of San Francisco (1940)
- Mediterranean Ports of Call (1941)
- Glimpses of Florida (1941)
- George Town: Pride of Penang (1941)
- Scenic Grandeur (1941)
- Minnesota: Land of Plenty (1942)
- Colorful North Carolina (1942)
- Glacier and Waterton Lakes (1942)
- Picturesque Massachusetts (1942)
- Modern Mexico City (1942)
- Glimpses of Ontario (1942)
- Mighty Niagara (1943)
- Romantic Nevada (1943)
- Motoring in Mexico (1943)
- A Day in Death Valley (1944)
- Mackinac Island (1944)
- Colorful Colorado (1944)
- Roaming Through Arizona (1944)
- Seeing El Salvador (1945)
- Modern Guatemala City (1945)
- Merida and Campeche (1945)
- Visiting Vera Cruz (1946)
- Looking at London (1946)
- Over the Seas to Belfast (1946)
- Glimpses of California (1946)
- Calling on Costa Rica (1947)
- On the Shores of Nova Scotia (1947)
- Chicago, the Beautiful (1948)
- Night Life in Chicago (1948)
- Ontario: Land of Lakes (1949)
- Calling on Michigan (1949)
- Roaming Through Northern Ireland (1949)
- Glimpses of Old England (1949)
- A Wee Bit of Scotland (1949)
- Pastoral Panoramas (1950)
- Roaming Through Michigan (1950)
- To the Coast of Devon (1950)
- Touring Northern England (1950)
- Life on the Thames (1950)
- Romantic Riviera (1951)
- Visiting Italy (1951)
- Life in the Andes (1952)
- Beautiful Brazil (1952)
- Land of the Taj Mahal (1952)
- Ancient India (1952)
- Pretoria to Durban (1952)
- Calling on Cape Town (1952)
- Johannesburg: City of Gold (1953)
- Looking at Lisbon (1953)
- Delightful Denmark (1953)
- In the Valley of the Rhine (1953)
- Beautiful Bavaria (1953)
- Land of the Ugly Duckling (1953) (Denmark)
- Seeing Spain (1953)
- Glimpses of Western Germany (1954)
- The Grand Canyon, Pride of Creation (1954)
- Yosemite the Magnificent (1954) (Last FitzPatrick short produced by Metro-Goldwyn-Mayer)
- VistaVision Visits Norway (1954) (First FitzPatrick short produced by Paramount Pictures in both CinemaScope and VistaVision)
- VistaVision Visits Mexico (1954)
- VistaVision Visits Hawaii (1955)
- VistaVision Visits Mexico (1955)
- VistaVision Visits Spain (1955)
- VistaVision Visits Sun Trails (1955)
- VistaVision Visits Austria (1956)
- VistaVision Visits Gibraltar (1956)
- VistaVision Visits Panama (1956)

== Home video availability ==
In 2016, Warner Bros. Home Entertainment released the entire series of shorts in a three-volume DVD-R set titled Fitzpatrick Traveltalks. Individual shorts may also be found as extras on DVDs of Warner Bros. films of the period:

- Los Angeles: Wonder City of the West is on the DVD of Sylvia Scarlett
- Cherry Blossom Time in Japan is on the DVD of China Seas
- Paris on Parade is on the DVD and Blu-Ray of An American in Paris
- Modern New Orleans and Old New Orleans are on the DVD of The Toast of New Orleans
- Cavalcade of San Francisco is on the DVD of Go West
- Glimpses of Florida is on the DVD of Lady Be Good
- Looking at London is on the DVD and Blu-Ray of The Three Musketeers
- Glimpses of California is on the DVD of Till the Clouds Roll By
- Chicago, the Beautiful and Night Life in Chicago are on the DVD and Blu-Ray of In the Good Old Summertime
- Roaming Through Michigan is on the DVD of Three Little Words
- Romantic Riviera is on the DVD of Easy to Love
- Land of the Taj Mahal and Ancient India are on the DVD of Kim
- Land of the Taj Mahal is on the DVD of The Prisoner of Zenda (1937 and 1952 dual-disc version)
