= The Gay Caballero (1940 film) =

1940 film by Otto Brower

- Film poster
- Directed by: Otto Brower
- Written by: O. Henry (character); Albert Duffy (screenplay)
- Produced by: Ralph Dietrich, Walter Morosco
- Starring: Cesar Romero; Sheila Ryan; Robert Sterling
- Cinematography: Edward Cronjager
- Edited by: Harry Reynolds
- Music by: Charles Maxwell
- Distributed by: 20th Century-Fox
- Release date: October 4, 1940
- Running time: 58 minutes
- Country: United States
- Language: English

The Gay Caballero is a 1940 American Western film directed by Otto Brower and starring Cesar Romero, Sheila Ryan and Robert Sterling. It is an entry in The Cisco Kid series of Westerns.

== Plot ==
In a case of mistaken identity, the Cisco Kid and his sidekick Gordito arrive in town only to learn that Cisco has been declared dead. Even worse than that, before he died, Cisco was accused of having tried to steal Susan Wetherby's land. Cisco must prove both his identity and his innocence.

== Cast ==
- Cesar Romero as The Cisco Kid
- Sheila Ryan as Susan Wetherby
- Robert Sterling as Billy Brewster
- Chris-Pin Martin as Gordito
- Janet Beecher as Kate Brewster
- Edmund MacDonald as Joe Turner
- Jacqueline Dalya as Carmelita
- C. Montague Shaw as George Wetherby
- Hooper Atchley as Sheriff McBride
