= Vicki Peters =

American model and former actress (born 1950)

Playboy centerfold appearance
- April 1972
- Preceded by: Ellen Michaels
- Succeeded by: Deanna Baker

Personal details
- Born: Vicki Jean Peters; September 9, 1950 (age 75) Minneapolis, Minnesota, U.S.
- Height: 5 ft 8 in (1.73 m)

Vicki Jean Peters (born September 9, 1950) is an American model and former actress. She made her film debut in the exploitation film Blood Mania (1970), and was Playboy magazine's Playmate of the Month for its April 1972 issue.

== Early life ==
Peters was born in Minneapolis, Minnesota, to Joseph Blair Peters and Emogene Maybell Taylor. She spent her early life there and in St. Paul.

== Career ==
In 1968, Peters relocated from St. Paul to Los Angeles, California, hoping to begin a career as an actress. In 1970, Peters appeared in the film Blood Mania, along with fellow Playboy playmate Reagan Wilson (October 1967). In 1971, she had a walk-on part in the horror film The Cult (1971). In addition to several television series.Peters had a successful career in modeling from 1975-1982 with Nina Blanchard and Ford Models. She was Playboy magazine's Playmate of the Month for its April 1972 issue. Her centerfold was photographed by Mario Casilli. In her interview with the magazine, Peters revealed she had abandoned her acting career and was working at photographer Harry Philmore Langdon Jr.'s (son of Harry Langdon) studio. She credits Langdon for launching her modeling career.

== Personal life ==
Peters married film producer Jeffrey Konvitz in 1980. She has a daughter with him, Kristen Nicole, born in 1983. They divorced in 1988.

She married Robert Lieberman in 2010-2023 Lieberman was an American award winning television and film director until his death July 1, 2023 in Los Angeles.

== Filmography ==
| Year | Title | Role | Notes |
|---|---|---|---|
| 1970 | Blood Mania | Gail Waterman | |
| 1971 | The Cult | Actress | Also known as The Manson Massacre |
| 1975 | Mitchell | Helena Jackman | |

| Marilyn Cole | P. J. Lansing | Ellen Michaels | Vicki Peters | Deanna Baker | Debbie Davis |
| Carol O'Neal | Linda Summers | Susan Miller | Sharon Johansen | Lena Söderberg | Mercy Rooney |
