= Mystery Submarine (1950 film) =

1950 film by Douglas Sirk

- Film poster
- Directed by: Douglas Sirk
- Screenplay by: George W. George; George F. Slavin
- Story by: Ralph Dietrich
- Produced by: Ralph Dietrich
- Starring: Macdonald Carey; Märta Torén; Robert Douglas
- Cinematography: Clifford Stine
- Edited by: Virgil W. Vogel (as Virgil Vogel)
- Production company: Universal Pictures
- Distributed by: Universal Pictures
- Release date: December 1950
- Running time: 78 minutes
- Country: United States
- Language: English

Mystery Submarine is a 1950 American war film directed by Douglas Sirk and starring Macdonald Carey, Märta Torén and Robert Douglas.

== Plot ==
Madeline Brenner, a German naturalized as an American, is being questioned by a federal prosecutor who is considering treason charges against her.

In flashback, she describes how she worked on Cape Cod as a secretary for wealthy Mrs. Weber. Madeline believes that her husband had died five years earlier in 1945, when his U-boat, the U-64, was sunk. She is approached by a mysterious man on the beach who says that her husband is still alive and that she can be reunited with him if she helps kidnap Dr. Gurnitz, a noted German scientist visiting Mrs. Weber. During a yacht cruise the next day, Madeline disables the radio as the U-64 surfaces and the submarine's crew kidnaps Gurnitz. On board the U-64, Madeline discovers that she has been told a lie, as her husband is indeed dead, although his submarine survived. The man from the beach, Eric von Molter, is now in command, and had used her to gain access to Gurnitz. Von Molter sinks the yacht, killing Mrs. Weber, the passengers and crew.

Captain Elliott and Dr. Brett Young provide testimony. Elliot describes how the Navy determined that the yacht was sunk by a German torpedo and learned that the renegade submarine might be operating from a secret base near the town of Belgrana in an unnamed South American country. They had sent Young, one of their best spies, to investigate.

Young describes how he searched the coast, discovering the cove where the U-64 was hiding. Young is caught, but von Molter believes Young's cover story that he is a German submariner who escaped an American POW camp. Von Molter invites Young to act as medic, tending to Gurnitz. Madeline feels that she is a prisoner on von Molter's estate, but he is determined to win her heart. Von Molter plans to trade Gurnitz on the high seas in a few days. Young attempts to use the U-64's radio to warn his superiors, but von Molter catches him before he can send a message. Madeline attempts to escape the estate, but Young stops her. Young tells von Molter that he needs medication for Gurnitz and wants to travel to Belgrana for it, hoping to radio for help, but von Molter says that they will leave early on the U-64 and stop for medicine in Belgrana on the way. In Belgrana, Young slips a note to a nurse at the clinic, but von Molter shoots the nurse and finds the note.

At sea, a U.S. Navy ship discovers the U-64. Von Molter takes evasive action, but Madeline risks her life to fire a flare, revealing their location, as Young instructed her to do. The American ships fire depth charges and Von Molter shoots debris from the torpedo tube to create the illusion that the submarine has been sunk. Among the items is a lifejacket on which Young had written the coordinates of the planned meeting at sea where Gurnitz will be released. The Americans continue firing depth charges, so von Molter commands the U-64 below the maximum safe depth to hide.

When the U-64 reaches the meeting point at sea, Von Molter takes Gurnitz to the other ship, along with Young and Madeline, who are to be killed. As von Molter unwraps his payment, it is revealed to be the life preserver on which Young had written. Navy men appear, revealing that they had laid a trap. Von Molter says that his submarine has orders to fire on the ship if he does not return in ten minutes. The Navy refuses to allow him to return, so everyone waits a few tense minutes until, just as the U-64 prepares to fire, a squadron of American military planes appears, bombing the U-64 and saving the day.

Back in the present, Young argues to the prosecutor that Madeline had risked her life to save them all and should not be charged with treason. The prosecutor agrees, allowing Young and Madeline to walk away together, arm in arm.

== Cast ==
- Macdonald Carey as Doctor Brett Young
- Märta Torén as Madeline Brenner
- Robert Douglas as Commander Eric von Molter
- Carl Esmond as Heldman
- Ludwig Donath as Dr. Adolph Guernitz
- Jacqueline Dalya as Carla (as Jacqueline Dalya Hilliard)
- Fred Nurney as Bruno
- Katherine Warren as Mrs. Weber (as Katherline Warren)
- Howard Negley as Captain Elliott
- Bruce Morgan as Kramer
- Ralph Brooks as Stefan (as Ralph Brooke)
- Paul Hoffman as Hartwig
- Peter Michael as Crew Member
- Larry Winter as Crew Member
- Frank Rawls as Crew Member
- Peter Similuk as Crew Member
