= Chac: Dios de la lluvia =

1975 film

- Directed by: Rolando Klein
- Written by: Rolando Klein
- Produced by: Rolando Klein
- Starring: Pablo Canche Balam; Alonso Mendez Ton; Sebastian Santis; Pedro Tiez
- Cinematography: William B. Kaplan; Álex Phillips Jr.
- Edited by: Harry Keramidas
- Music by: Victor Forzado; Elisabeth Waldo
- Distributed by: Libra Films Milestone Film & Video
- Release date: 1975
- Running time: 95 minutes
- Countries: Mexico; Panama
- Languages: Tzeltal; Mayan Languages; Spanish

Chac: Dios de la lluvia, also released as Chac: the Rain God and simply Chac, is a 1975 film written and directed by Rolando Klein.

The film involves modern Maya peoples invoking the traditional rain deity Chaac.

The film is in the Maya languages. The majority of the cast speaks Tzeltal Maya, but one of the main actors, Pablo Canche Balam who plays the shaman, speaks Yucatec Maya.

Alonso Méndez Ton, who plays the cacique, was born in the city of Tenejapa, in the state of Chiapas, where he collaborated in ethnographic research. He had finished his term as mayor of Tenejapa when the movie was made.

The film is referenced in Richard Kadrey's novel Aloha From Hell where it is called Las montañas del Gehenna (a title that appears nowhere else). The narrator's plot description is basically accurate though he does incorrectly call it a "Mexican spaghetti western".

== Bibliography ==
- Chac: The Rain God (1975/2002), Guide til Guatemala, Mikkel Møldrup-Lakjer, 07/09/2005
- Chac: The Rain God, Film Notes, New York State - Writers Institute, 3 notable reviews (1. Edward Guthmann - San Francisco Chronicle, 7 July 2000; 2. Wesley Morris - San Francisco Examiner, 7 July 2000; 3. Ian Jane - DVDtalk, June 2004), S. University of New York
- Chac: The Rain God, Chicagoreader, Fred Camper, 26 October 1985
