= William A. Ulman =

American writer, soldier (1907–1979)

William A. Ulman Jr.
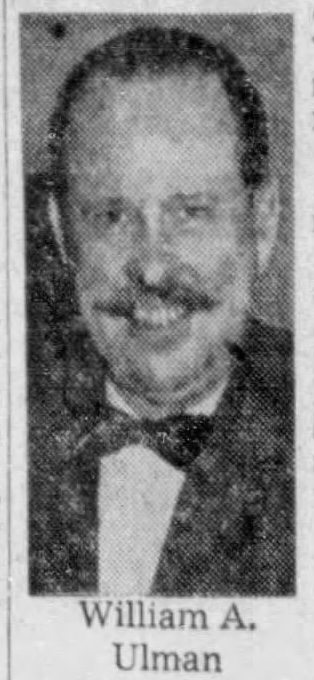
- Sacramento Bee, 1955
- Born: November 6, 1907; New York City, New York, U.S.
- Died: August 22, 1979 (aged 71); Maryland, U.S.
- Other name: W.A. Ulman
- Known for: Screenplays, magazine writing, U.S. Army Pictorial Service during WWII, probably Cold War-era CIA

William Alban Ulman Jr. (November 6, 1907 – August 22, 1979) was a film screenwriter, magazine writer and U.S. Army officer. He is best known today for his involvement in the photographic record of D-Day. A persistent legend of D-Day is that important footage of the landings was dumped into the English Channel. Maj. W.A. Ulman is mentioned in at least two memos regarding film of the landings and as such has historically been considered a "suspect" in the lore of D-Day.

== Career ==
Ulman was born 1907 in New York and moved to Los Angeles in 1919 when his father, a corporate attorney, was hired by the founders of United Artists. In 1930 he "sold a script" and entered the movie business for himself. In 1931 he began working in publicity for Paramount Pictures. In 1933 he worked with Charles S. Belden on a script called Hock Shop, which was to be produced by B. P. Schulberg. In 1933 he was hired by RKO to co-write a script called News Reel with Sarah Y. Mason.

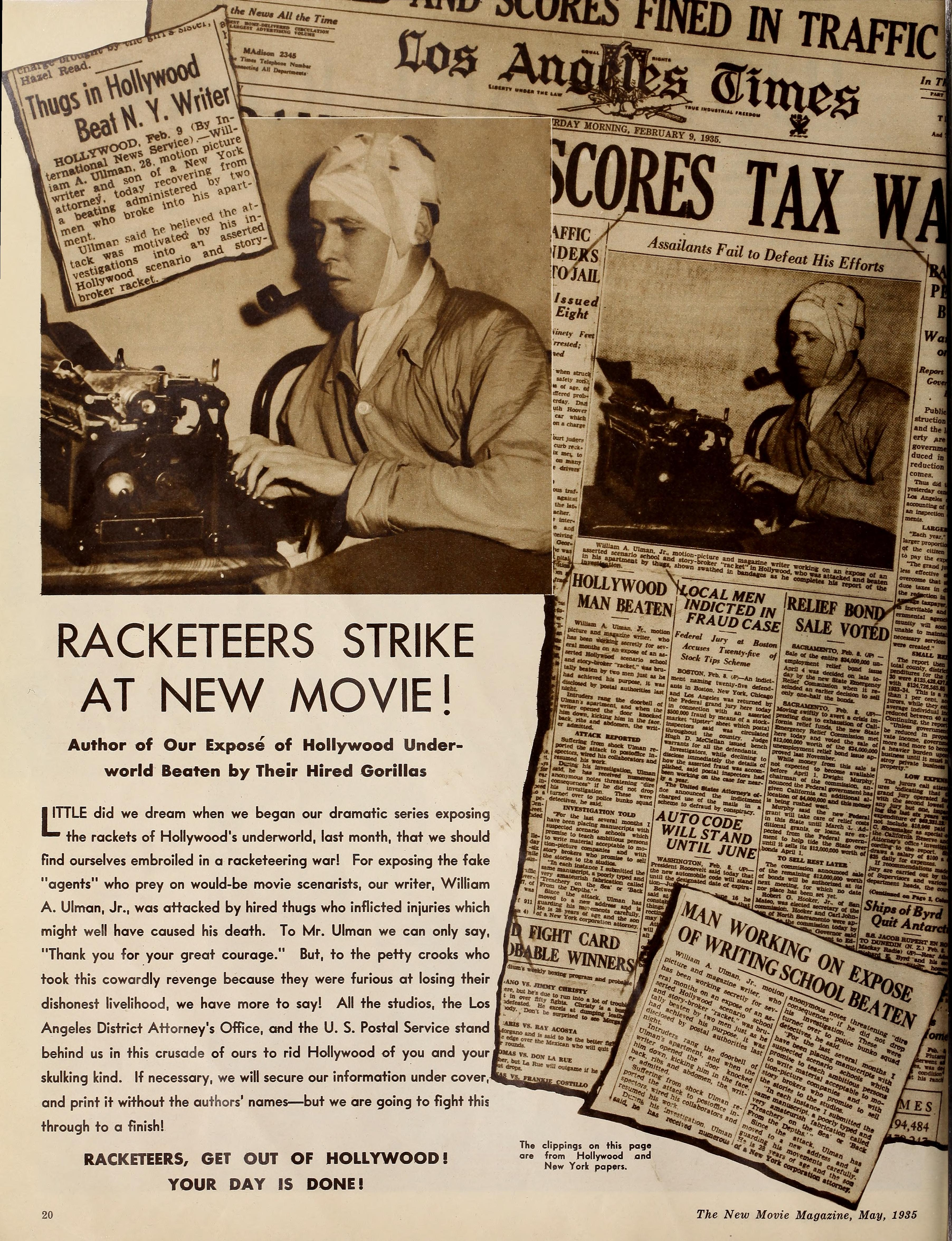
Film writer roughed up (1935)

Ulman made national headlines in 1935 when an exposé he'd been writing about shady services exploiting novice screenwriters got him a visit and a thorough beating from a racketeer's enforcers. In 1936 Ulman earned a credit for the Republic Pictures melodrama Down Under the Sea. In the mid-1930s Ulman wrote a number of celebrity profiles for film magazines, reporting on Bing Crosby's relationship with his mother, how Myrna Loy and William Powell played a married couple so convincingly in The Thin Man series, and that Gary Cooper preferred action plots to performing love stories. After doing a 1936 profile for Movie Classic magazine on Errol Flynn, during which the two apparently hit it off, the pair formed a production partnership. Their main collaboration was on a script called The White Rajah, about Sir James Brooke, Rajah of Sarawak. The film was meant to be a star vehicle for Flynn but was never produced, although it remained in development for as many as 30 years. Flynn and Ulman remained in touch until at least 1940 when Flynn reportedly told Ulman (for use in print) that he had traveled to South America and seen "fifth columnists" at work there. The 1939 Wallace Beery film Sergeant Madden, directed by Josef von Sternberg, was based on an Ulman story called "A Gun in His Hand." In 1939 he also sold a script called Gold Star Mothers to Producers' Picture Corporation. In 1940 Paramount was supposed to be producing a script he has co-written, called Two Bad Angels. In 1943 he was credited with the story for the gangster film Behind Prison Walls.

In January 1941 a drunk driver hit Ulman's car head on in the Cahuenga Pass; Ulman's wife was injured in the crash. Ulman enlisted in the U.S. Army on November 16, 1941. He was placed in the Pictorial Service of the Signal Corps. The credited writer on the U.S. military's social guidance film about STIs, Sex Hygiene, directed by John Ford, was one W. Ulman. In 1942 his rank was captain and he may have been based in the Munitions Building in Washington, D.C. On June 17, 1944, Ulman was quoted in the Los Angeles Times, his hometown paper, about the events of D Day. According to the L.A. Times, Ulman "directed the transmission of Army invasion photographs."

'Thirty-four hours after H-hour, pictures of the fighting were being wired back to the United States,' he declared yesterday at his headquarters in the European war theater. ¶ 'The unsung heroes of the assault were the aggressive seamen aboard the assault and landing craft which brought the troops to the beaches. Their aggressive spirit pervaded all men around them.' ¶ 'When Nazi guns opened up anywhere along the beach, Allied vessels calmly moved in and blasted them to smithereens. The attack was perfectly coordinated.'

Ulman's mention as Maj. W. A. Ulman or Ullman in memos about film of the Normandy invasion has led to his association with persistent tales of a sunken craft or a duffel bag containing film of the American landings at D-Day being irretrievably lost in the English Channel. Per an analysis by military historian Charles Herrick, "Ulman could not have been the mysterious courier who [supposedly] dropped the Utah Beach film in the ocean. Indeed, the only evidence we have of him on D-Day places him in the Transport Area, 13 miles off Omaha Beach." By May 1945, Ulman's rank was Lt. Colonel. His final rank was Colonel. He was listed in the V-E Day edition of San Fernando Valley Times as a serviceman originally from North Hollywood.

Signal Corps officer Ulman
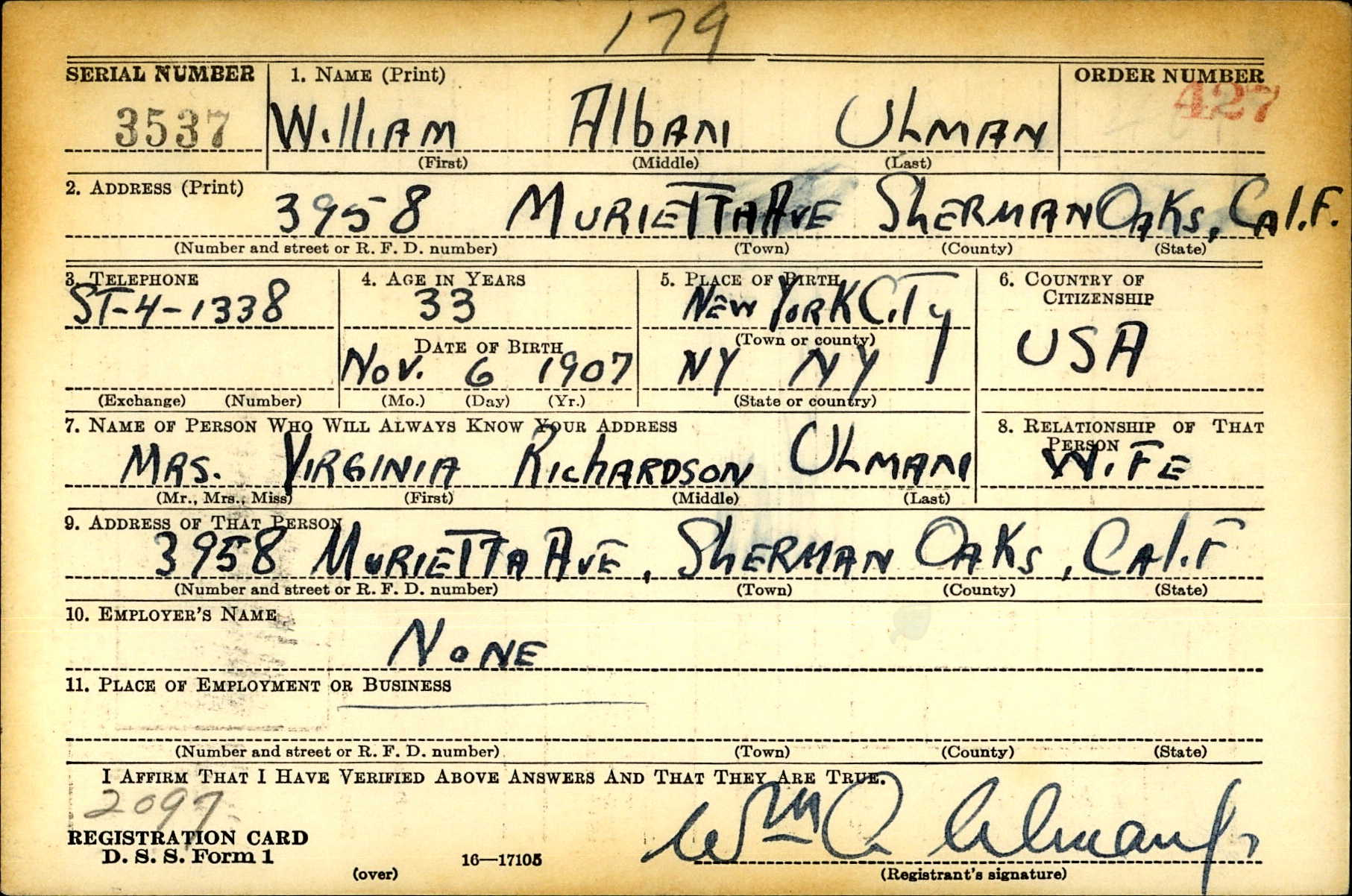
William Alban Ulman Jr. World War II draft registration card

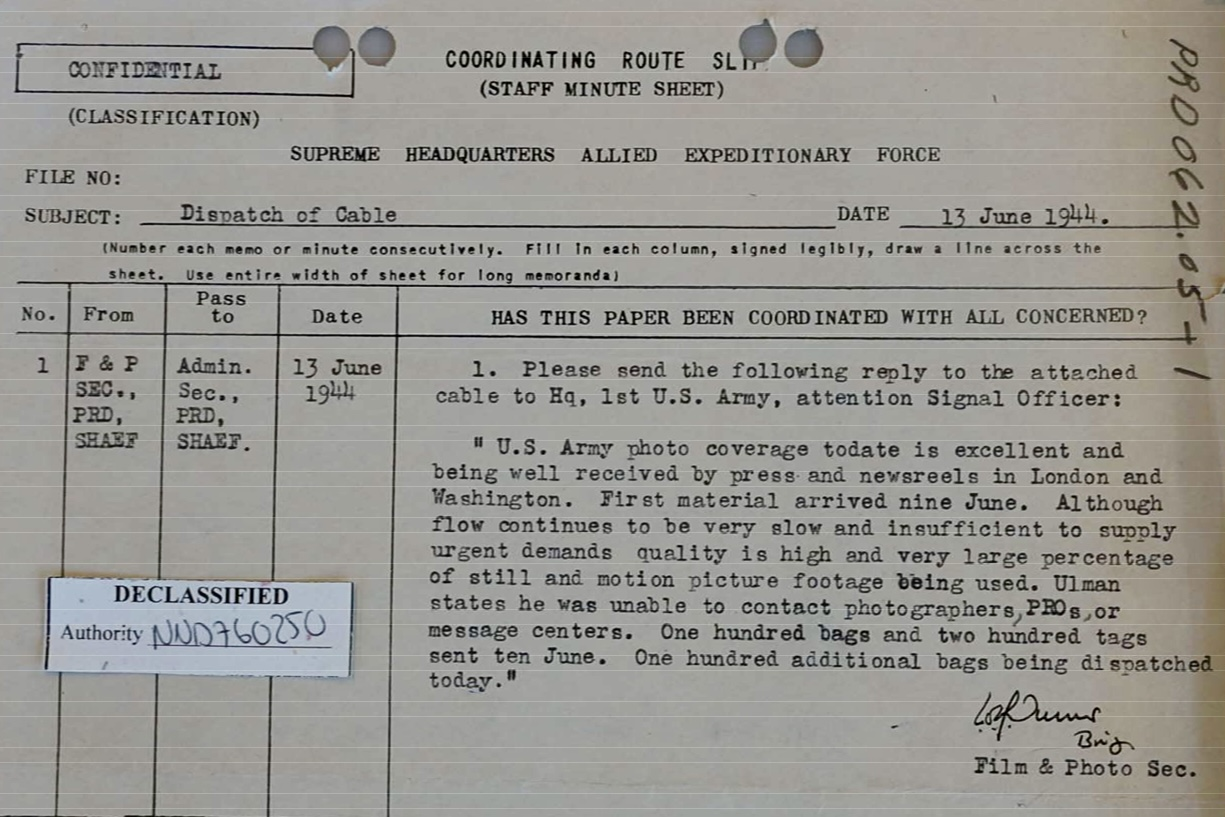
"Ulman states he was unable to contact photographers, PROs or message centers"

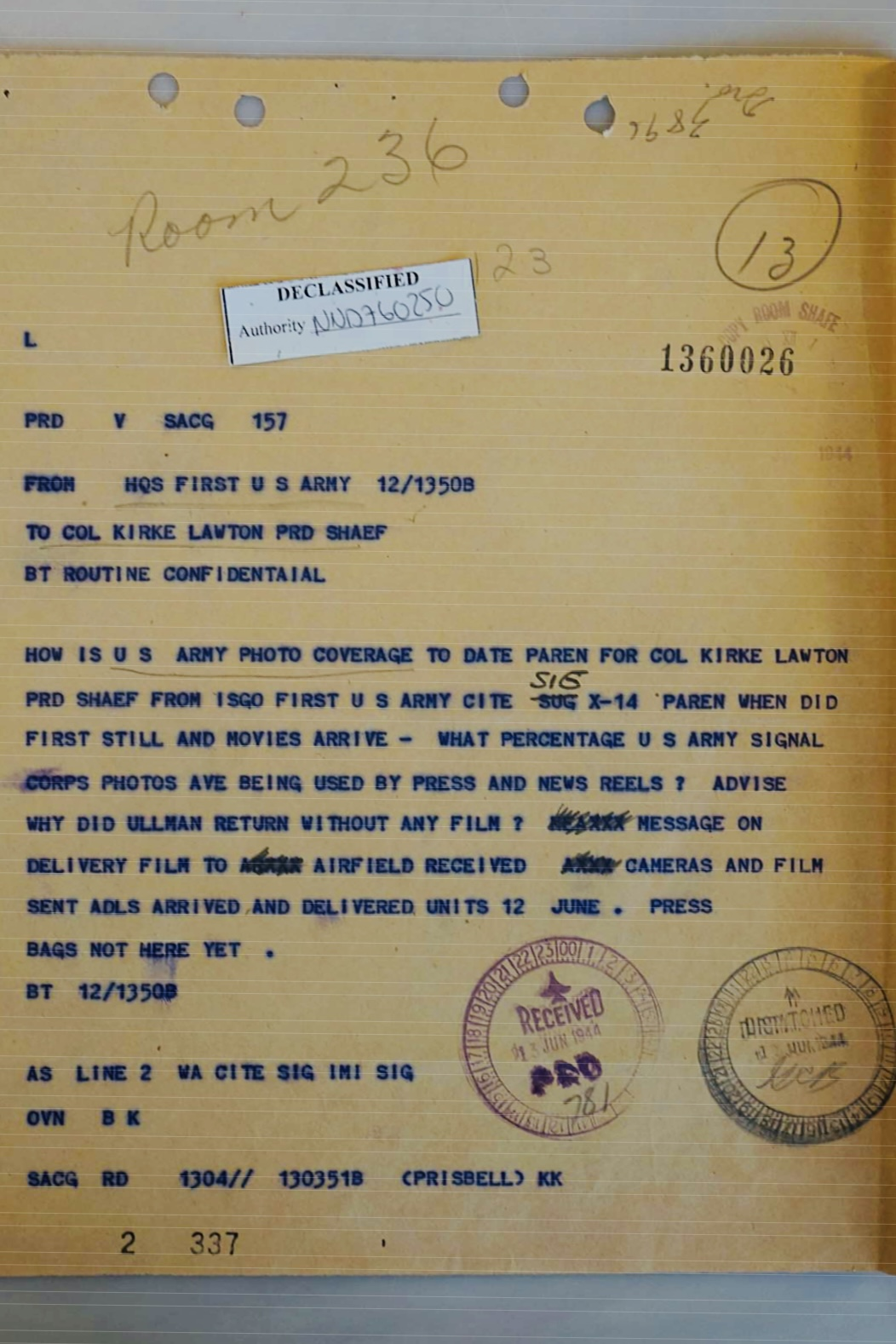
"ADVISE WHY DID ULLMAN RETURN WITHOUT ANY FILM ?"

Circa 1946, Ulman was involved in the production of a film about the Nuremberg Trials. Ulman was discharged from the Army on May 8, 1946. In the 1950s, he returned to magazine writing, but this time with a focus on geopolitical topics. In 1952 he wrote "Stalin's Hate-America Movies" for The Week. Ulman's 1953 piece for Collier's described the Soviet nuclear program, and reported that the Soviets were making flights over the Arctic designed to test U.S. defenses. Without additional funding for certain radar systems, the nation would be at risk of a deadly sneak attack. The Collier's story was included in a 1959 bibliography published by the U.S. Army called "Soviet Military Power."

In 1954 the Saturday Evening Post published an article by Ulman called "The GIs Who Fell for the Reds." In 1955 he had another Korean War story, this time an article in Argosy magazine about a downed American pilot named Capt. Ward Miller. Miller was apparently rescued by a North Korean World War II vet who was intrigued by the flyer's hand-carved wooden cross.

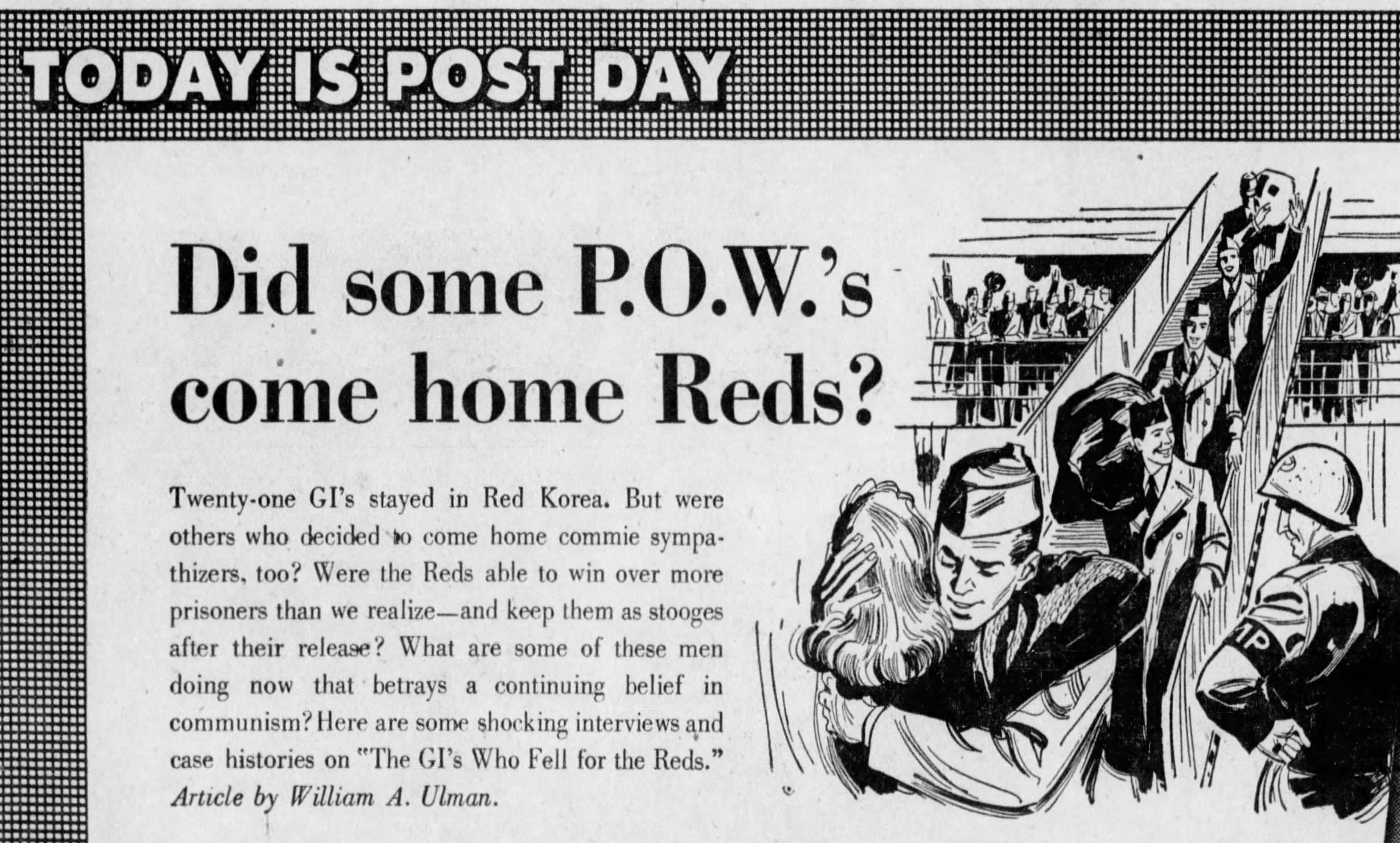
"Did some POWs come home Reds?" Saturday Evening Post advertisement, 1954

In 1955, Ulman was Assistant Administrator (Congressional Liaison and Public Affairs) for the Housing and Home Finance Agency. He also wrote a long feature in Nation's Business magazine about U.S. Army soldiers who had come from countries then in the Soviet sphere of influence. The article asserted that these individuals were thus able to give an insider's perspective on the USSR as military opponent. In 1959, Broadcasting magazine reported that Ulman had resigned as "account representative and vp of Communications Counselors, Washington. D.C., public relations affiliate of McCann-Erickson, to open Institute of World Travel (pr and research firm) in Washington."

Ulman died in 1979 in Maryland and is buried at Cheltenham State Veterans Cemetery.

In 2018, the non-profit organization muckrock.com filed an FOIA request to the Inspector General of the Central Intelligence Agency regarding Ulman:

Employee William Alban Ulman, born Nov. 6, 1907, who was shot in his Maryland home in 1963, by unknown gunmen. was it possible that the shooting was a result of retaliation, either national, or international for activities of this named employee ?

The FOIA request was rejected by the Agency.

== Personal life ==
Ulman was the only child of William Alban Ulman Sr. of Massillon, Ohio and Ethel McEwen of Nashville. Ulman Jr. is sometimes listed as William McEwan Ulman. The family initially lived in New York City where Senior worked as a corporate lawyer. Ulman Sr. became ill in old age and moved to Los Angeles to be closer to his son; he died in Beverly Hills in 1938.

Ulman Jr. was married three times and was the father of three children.

== See also ==
- John Ford's D-Day film
