= John Ford's D-Day footage =

Moving pictures of Omaha Beach landings

OMAHA BEACH, Easy Red sector or environs: At 0:39, this clip shows a large cadre of men running up a foggy beach covered in Czech hedgehogs (Shot by USCG Chief Photographer's Mate David C. Ruley)

Beachhead to Berlin is a 20-minute Warner Brothers film with narration and a fictionalized framing device that makes extensive use of USGS color footage of D-Day preparations and beach landings

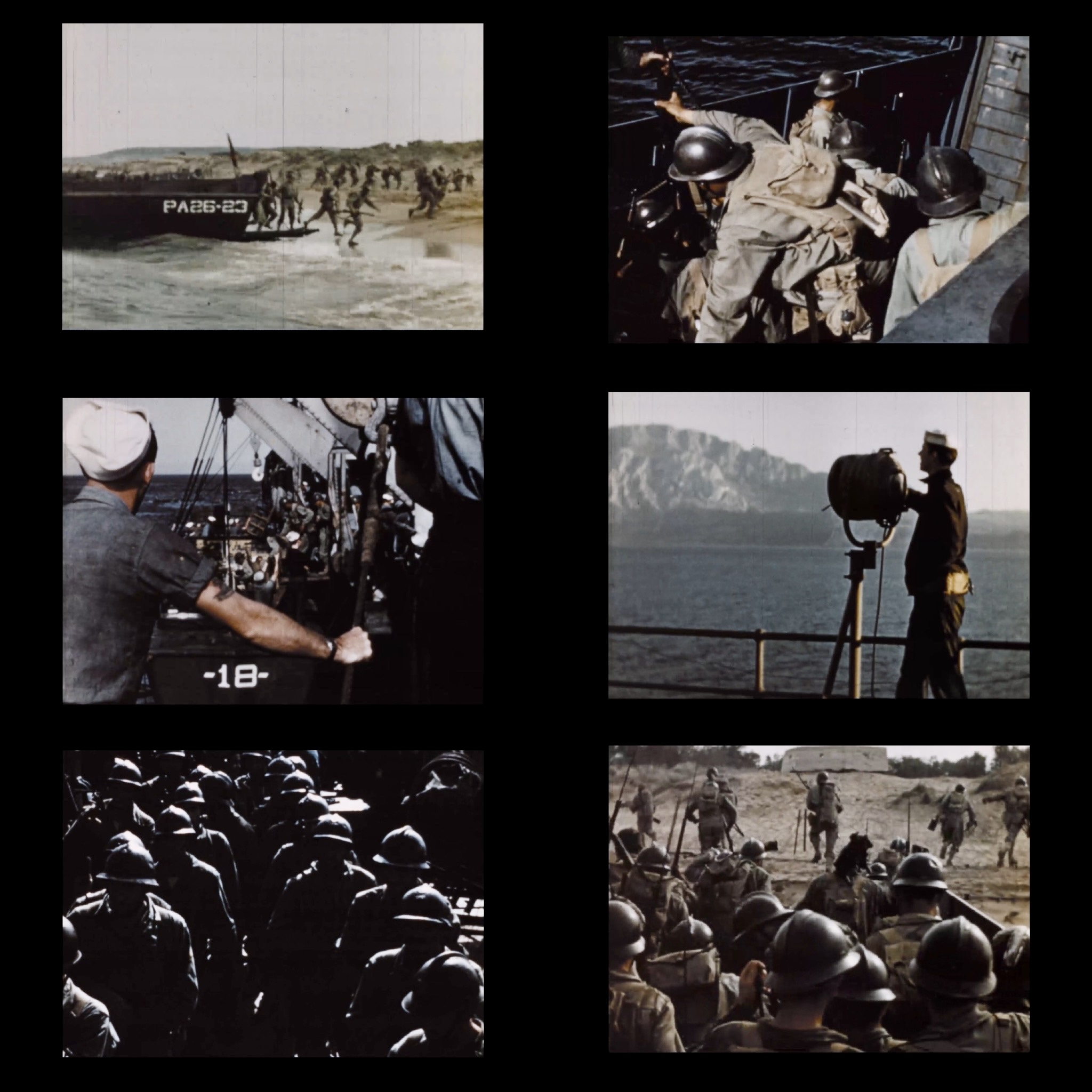
Frames from color footage filmed by OSS: Free French troops landing in France

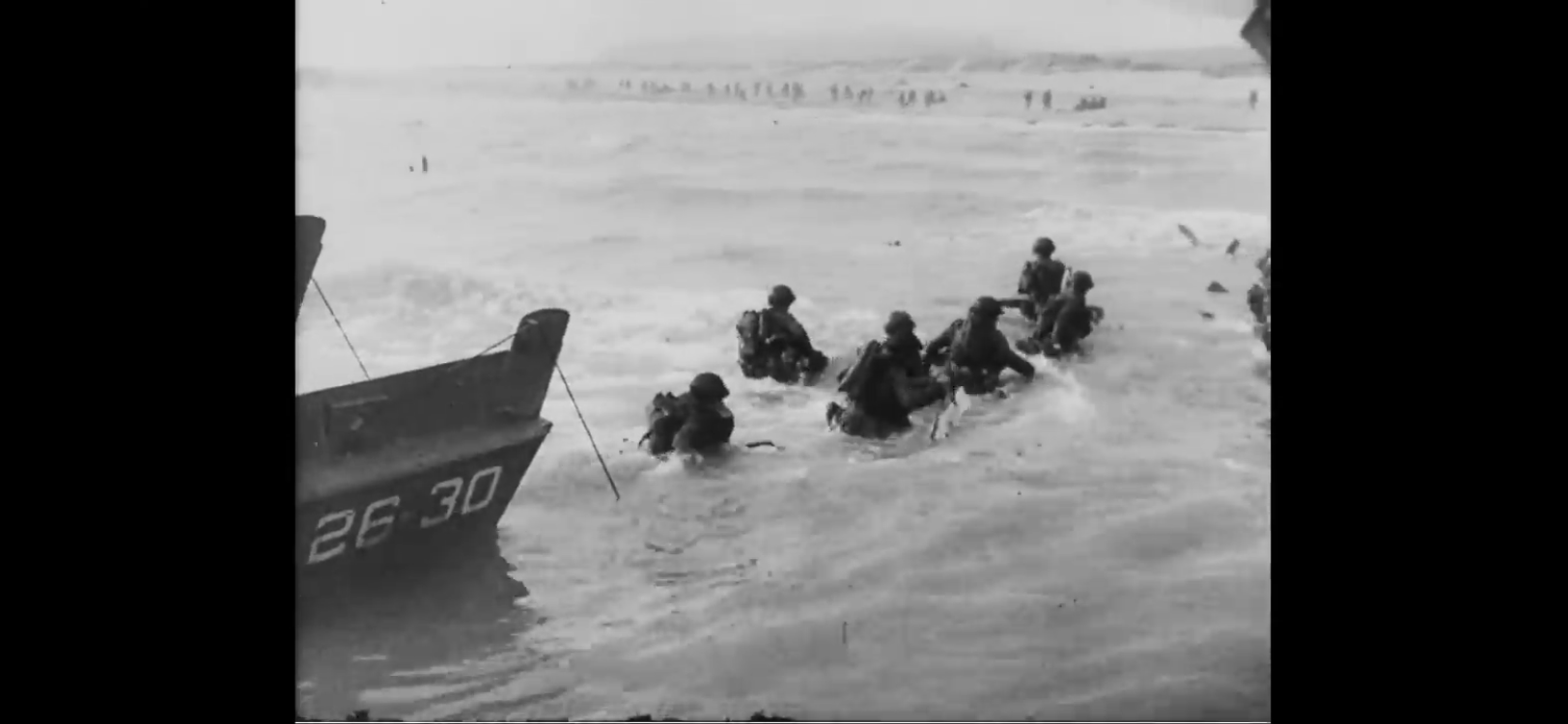
Frame from the 33-minute "D Day to D plus 3" film surfaced by the U.S. National Archives in 2014

John Ford's D-Day footage refers to the motion-picture film shot by 56 U.S. Coast Guard combat photographers and automated cameras mounted on landing craft under the direction of legendary Hollywood film director John Ford on Omaha Beach and environs during the Normandy landings and Battle of Normandy in summer 1944. Director George Stevens landed with the HMS Belfast and shot on Juno Beach. A Supreme Headquarters Allied Expeditionary Forces (SHAEF) timeline reported that 344,000 ft (105,000 m) of film was processed by the Allied communications departments in June 1944.

The films produced with this footage from the Field Photographic Unit of the U.S. Office of Strategic Services combined with other moving pictures of Operation Overlord produced by the collective Allied militaries of World War II may also be known as the OSS/SHAEF D-Day films.

Ford was the head of the U.S. government's Field Photographic Unit. He was in the employ of the Office of Strategic Services, an intelligence section of the U.S. military that was a predecessor to the Central Intelligence Agency. In a 1964 interview with American Legion magazine (on the occasion of the 20th anniversary of Operation Overlord), Ford reported that after landing with the USS Plunkett (DD-431) his team shot "millions of feet" in both color and black-and-white, but "mostly Kodachrome" (color), including near Colleville-sur-Mer. The film was shipped back to the UK and edited in London by a team working 24-hours-a-day in shifts, four hours on, four hours off. Producer Alan Brown supervised the editing, at Denham Studios.

== Top-secret film for Allied leaders ==
D-Day to D-Plus Three
- Digitized by U.S. National Archives and Records Administration
- https://www.youtube.com/watch?v=0fvQnDj4aqw

Some of Ford's footage was included in a documentary film that was shown to Allied leaders of World War II, namely British Prime Minister Winston Churchill, Supreme Allied Commander Dwight Eisenhower, Canadian Prime Minister Mackenzie King, U.S. President Franklin D. Roosevelt, and the USSR's Marshall Josef Stalin. The film sent to the Allied leaders was never released to the public and may be lost but in 2014, the U.S. National Archives surfaced 33 minutes of film on four reels that are believed to be this compilation. Upon investigation the Imperial War Museum found it had similar footage. NARA digitized these four reels and uploaded the footage to the Internet.

Former NARA moving-pictures archivist Steve Greene also unearthed an OSS field ledger that describes this film; the ledger states that the Allied-leaders edit was 4000 feet long. Per the Kodak online film calculator, if the film was 35 mm and 24 fps, it would have been about 44 minutes long.

The field ledger entry reads as follows:

L-32

SPECIAL INVASION STORY

Picture made for SHAEF of the operations in Normandy Invasion up to and including D+3. This was made from all the best footage from all Allied photographers.

Work done by Leeds, Sherman, Gerke, Del Campo, Baggins, Cooper, Flynn.

Footage approximately 4000 [feet].

All material was turned over to SHAEF (Capt Matthew Fox) including work print, sound negative of voice track, and composite (meaning with optical sound) dupe print. The classification was Top Secret. The original prints were intended for Pres. Roosevelt, PM Churchill, Marshall Stalin, PM Mackenzie King, & General Eisenhower.

— OSS field ledger

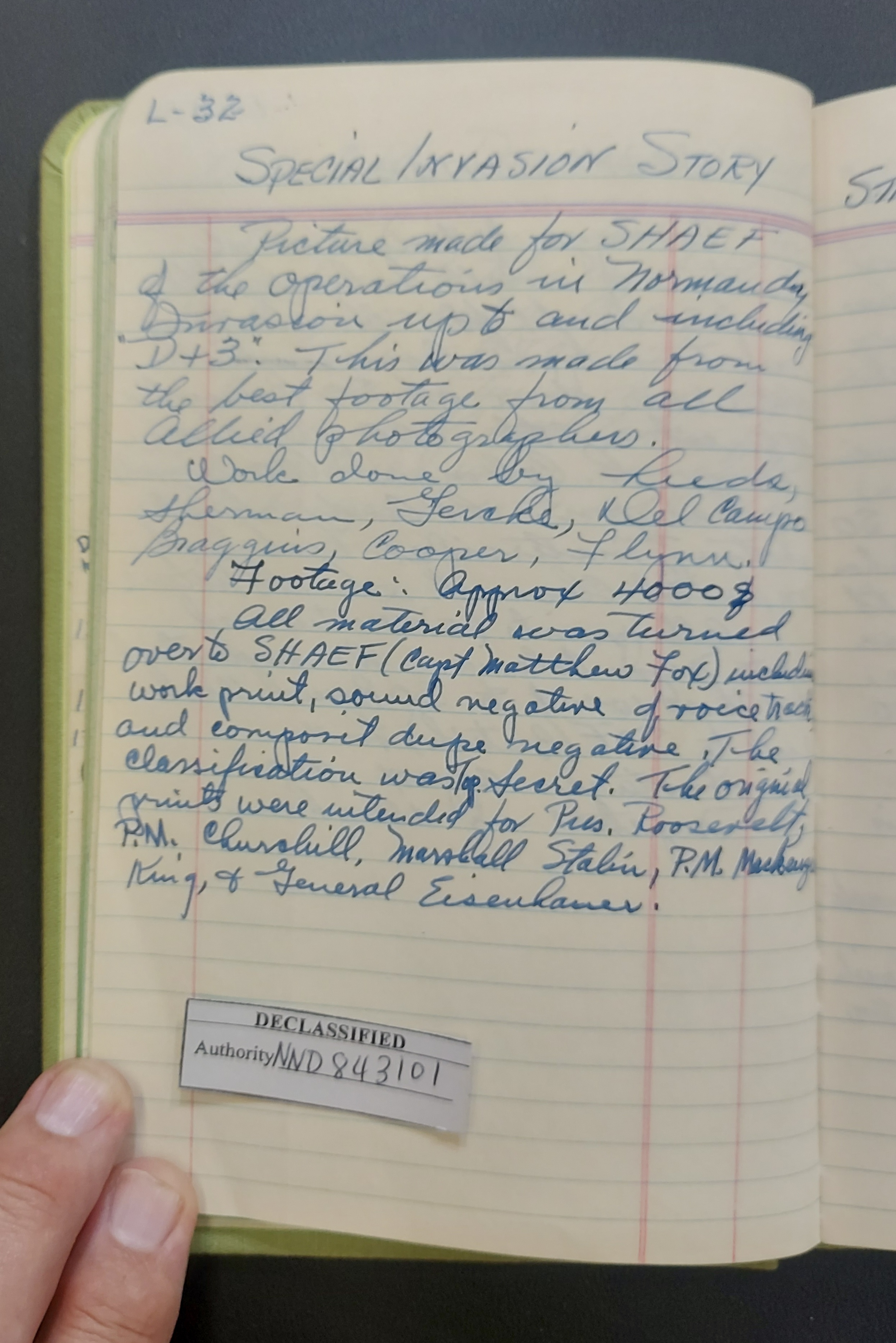
Page from OSS Field Photographic project ledger describing the Allied-leaders edit, which was classified top secret. (U.S. National Archives: RG226, Office of Strategic Services - Field Station Files Entry A1 148, Box 77)

Another source surfaced by Greene, U.S. Navy officer Frederick A. Spencer's personnel file, describes this cut as well, and indicates that Roosevelt saw the film on June 18, 1944:

June, 1944 — Directed by the SHAEF public relations office to direct, supervise and produce top secret documentary film of the Normandy invasion, from D-Day Minus 10 to D-Day Plus Four, utilizing all available footage. Three prints of this documentary were produced, one for President Roosevelt, one for Prime Minister Churchill, and one for Premier Stalin. Completion of this documentary was made in 72 hours. Delivery of print to President Roosevelt was on D-Day Plus Eight.

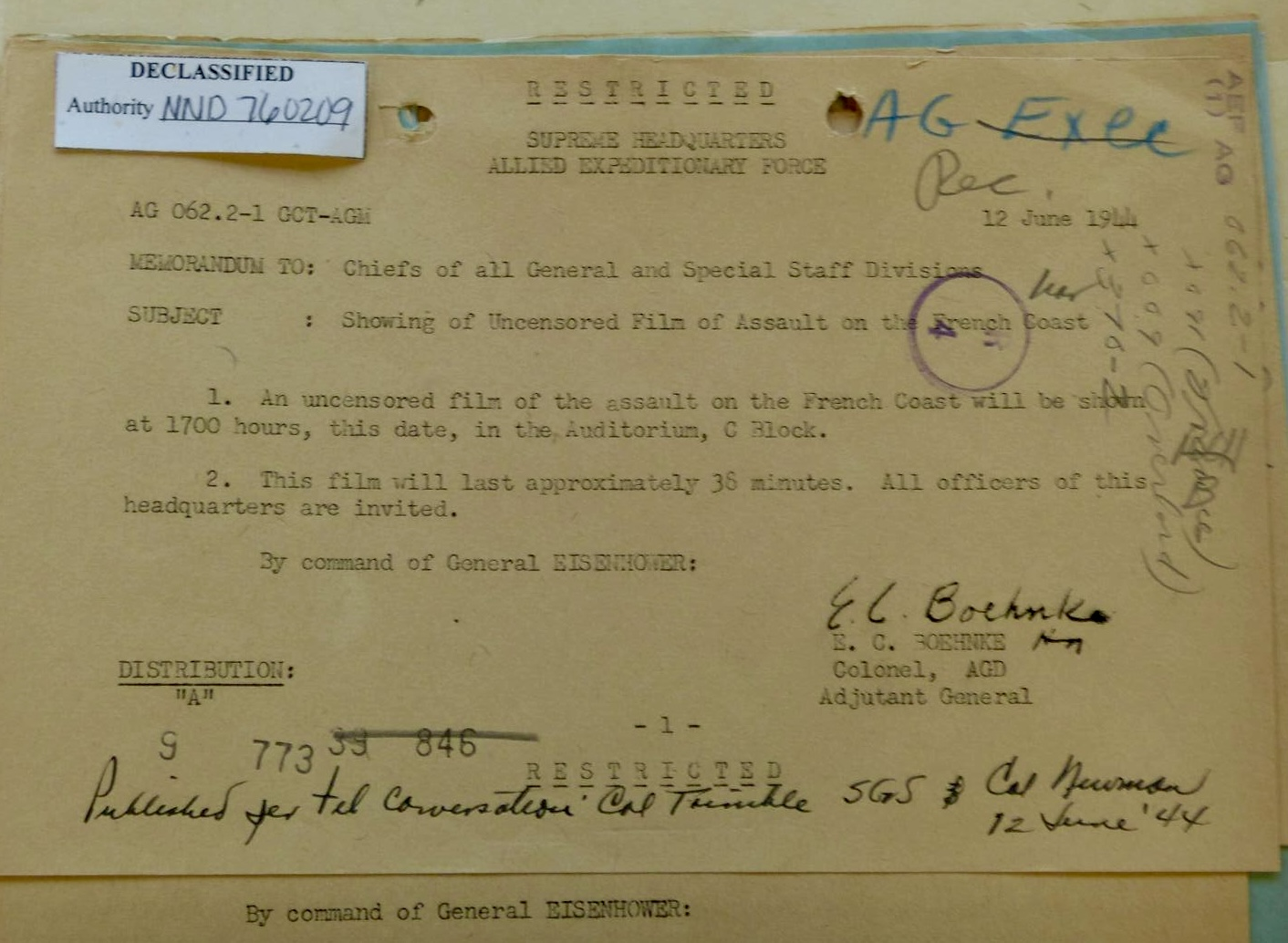
SHAEF Restricted, June 12, 1944: "1. An uncensored film of the assault on the French Coast will be shown at 1700 hours, this date, in the Auditorium, C Block. 2. This film will last approximately 36 minutes. All officers of this headquarters are invited."

== Screenings ==
Hollywood director Anatole Litvak, born in Ukraine and fluent in Russian, German, English, etc., traveled to Moscow to show a film to Allied diplomats, Soviet officers and Joseph Stalin. Stalin reportedly thought it ought to be released to the public. Litvak had nothing to do with producing the film and professed ignorance of military matters but he was rushed to Moscow due to his language skill and experience with filmmaking generally. According to a 26 June 1944 memo out of Whitehall, the initial embassy screenings consisted of "a Movietone News which showed British and Canadian troops and a 40-minute film, three-quarters of which was either British or Canadian." A screening for 150 "Red Army and Red Navy" officers was apparently something of a debacle ("bad in all respects"). For some reason the Movietone was excluded and the SHAEF film was cut down to 10 minutes of American-only footage. Interestingly, other memos show that the only restrictions on sharing the films (as per Stalin's apparent request) were two edits to remove a piece of an equipment and a unit insignia, and that the balance of American-British-Canadian cooperation not be disrupted by further editing.

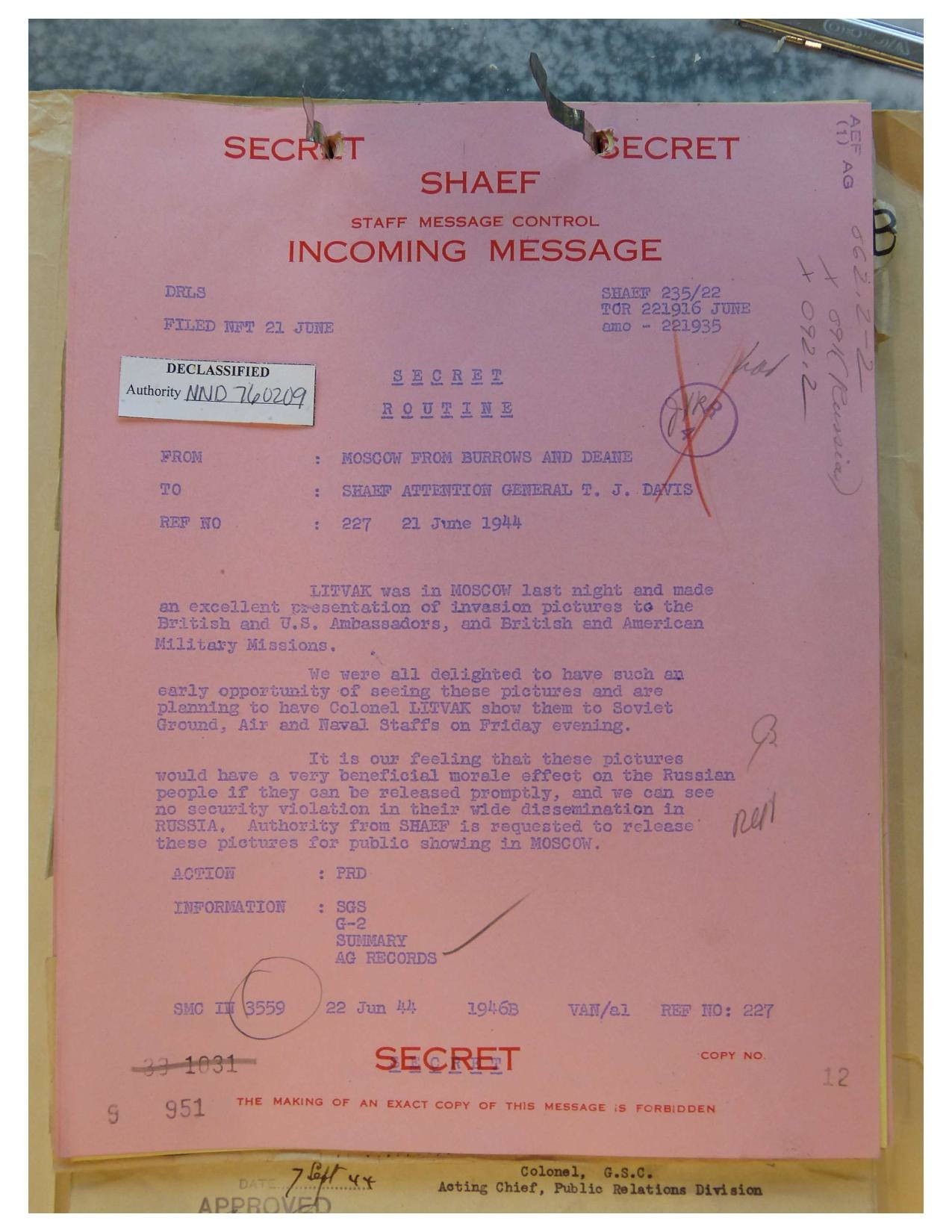
Hollywood director Anatole Litvak (born Анатолий Михайлович Литвак) screened invasion film for Soviet military officers

Meanwhile, some of the Ford-supervised color footage of the Normandy landings was converted to black and white for use in newsreels released by Movietone and Pathé. It also appeared in government documentaries including United States Coast Guard Report Number 4: Normandy Invasion. Ford's most effective contribution to the documentary record of D-Day was apparently his notion to install camera mounts and automated cameras to the front of vehicles, tanks and landing craft. According to Searching for John Ford, there were 500 Eyemo cameras, each loaded with four minutes of 35 mm movie film. According to a Navy citation commending Ford, 152 landing craft had fixed cameras, set to begin filming after the third man or third craft left the boat. Per a Brigadier W.A.S. Turner memo of 25 July 1944, the "excellent photographic coverage" obtained from the automated cameras was largely due to the "conversion, testing, installation, and operation" of the cameras by Lt. M. E. Armistead of the Field Photographic Branch.

According to the 1964 interview with Ford, very little of the footage he produced was ever released to the public, in part because images of dead Allied soldiers were considered bad for both military and civilian morale. Yet as of 1964—according to Ford—multiple reels of a John Ford-directed color film of the landings at Omaha Beach were still in storage in Anacostia, Washington, District of Columbia. There are currently hundreds of moving picture items from the Normandy invasion listed in the National Archives catalog.

Also, contra Ford's retelling in 1964, film-history researchers believe that Ford probably personally didn't land on a beach until D plus 2 or 3. Yet a contemporaneous OSS report stated, "Knowing full well he would be subjected to unusual exposure to enemy fire with- out means to take cover, he personally took charge of the entire operation and was the first of his unit to land...After landing he visited all of his men at their various assignments, and served as a great inspiration by his total disregard of danger in order to get the job done."

Ford himself said of his camera operators, who carried no weapons, "Facing the enemy defenseless takes a special kind of bravery."

== Product ==
Exigencies of wartime being what they are, film preservation was not a top priority amidst the push to defeat Adolf Hitler. Some of the footage seems to have been ruined and some promptly lost. According to one report, "A large amount of film was placed into a duffel bag to be sent back to England, however, the junior officer carrying it, Major W. A. Ullman accidentally dropped it into the English Channel." However the documentary record only says that Army Signal Corps officer William A. Ulman failed to make contact with any cameramen in the area. Per an analysis by military historian Charles Herrick, "Ulman could not have been the mysterious courier who [supposedly] dropped the Utah Beach film in the ocean. Indeed, the only evidence we have of him on D-Day places him in the Transport Area, 13 miles off Omaha Beach." Per Five Came Back: A Story of Hollywood and the Second World War by Mark Harris, "The cameras jammed, were damaged or captured little of interest."

Circa the 50th anniversary of the landings in 1994, historian Stephen Ambrose reported that the Eisenhower Center had been unable find a "John Ford film of Omaha Beach." According the Sydney Morning Herald in 2014, "When he was working on the documentary John Ford/John Wayne: The Film-maker and the Legend, Ken Bowser asked the US National Archives if they had any unreleased D-Day footage. They told him some footage was still under lock and key, but he doubts the 100-minute assembly still exists. 'I think it is probably mythological...I think by 1966, Ford had no idea of what the truth was. Those guys were all liars; we know that. They were just tall-tale tellers, and the tales got bigger every year.'"

The "legend" of a John Ford film of the American landings on D-Day began with journalist Pete Martin's interview with John Ford for the cover story of the June 1964 issue of American Legion magazine, "We Shot D-Day in Omaha Beach." (Page image via American Legion Digital Archive)

Joseph McBride's 2011 biography Searching for John Ford suggests that the work product of Ford's Field Photographic division owes less to auteur theory than to the workmanlike duties of wartime intelligence work:

Ford personally handled some of the directing and photographing chores, but because of the scope and range of Field Photo's activities, he mostly functioned like a studio chief or executive producer, assigning and training photographic crews and supervising their projects, some more closely than others. Much of what they shot was strictly utilitarian documentary footage, with little or no attempt at aesthetic shaping...most Field Photo films tended to be less emotional than analytical, offering hard-boiled presentations for professionals who did not need preaching or soft-soaping. Some of the films were not even edited but were simply reels of raw footage from the field.

Many reels of D-Day footage shot by the Coast Guard with OSS slates can be found in the National Archives, including some color footage. Per former NARA moving-image archivist Steve Greene, "Since they were operating under the Navy chain of command during the war, much of it is available under the Navy Record Group (RG428)."

== Additional images ==
D-Day film production
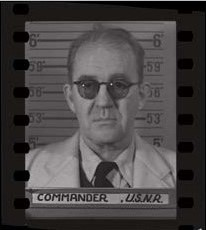
John Ford's Navy personnel photo

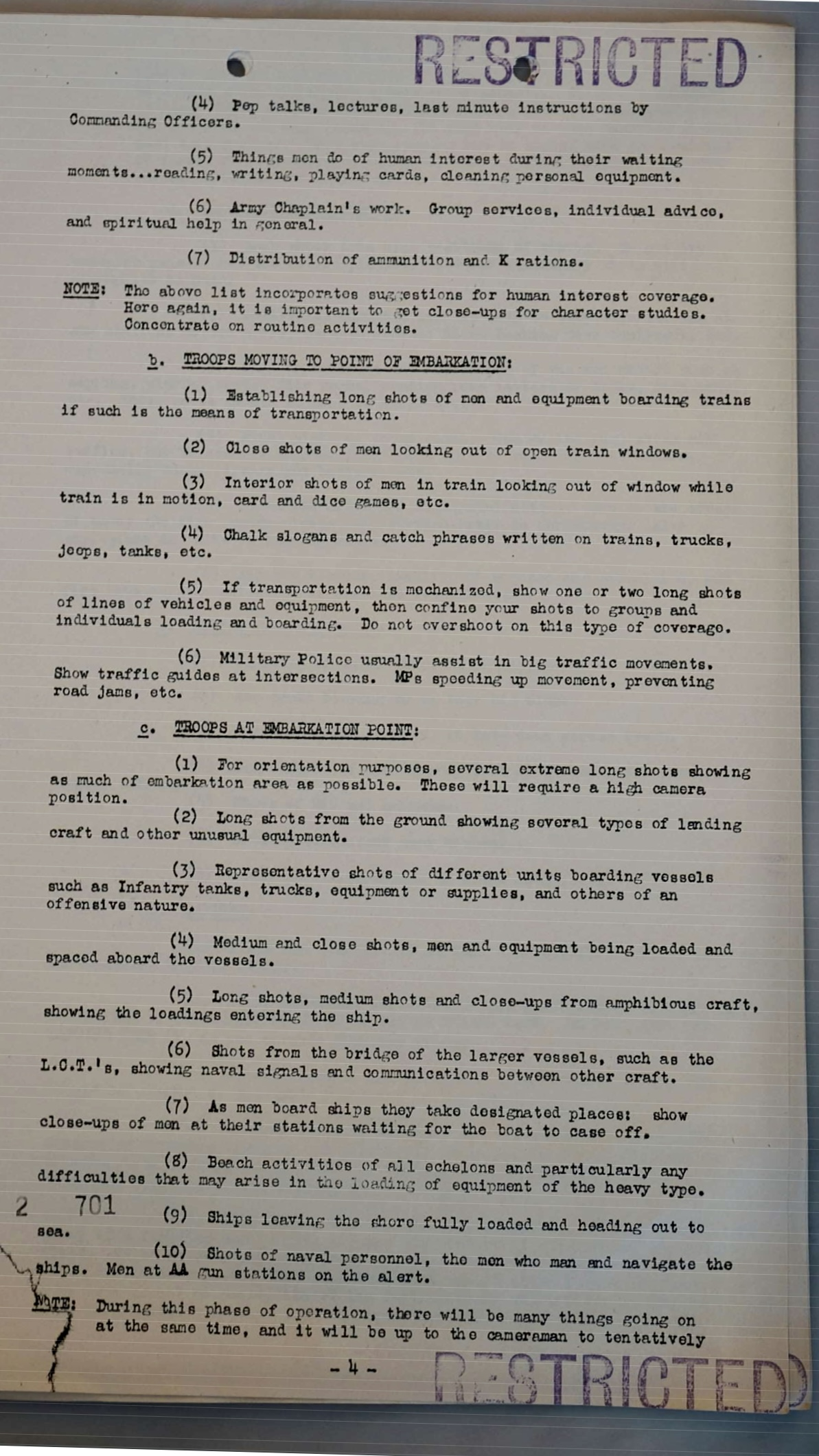
One page of a nine-page list of requested shots of the invasion

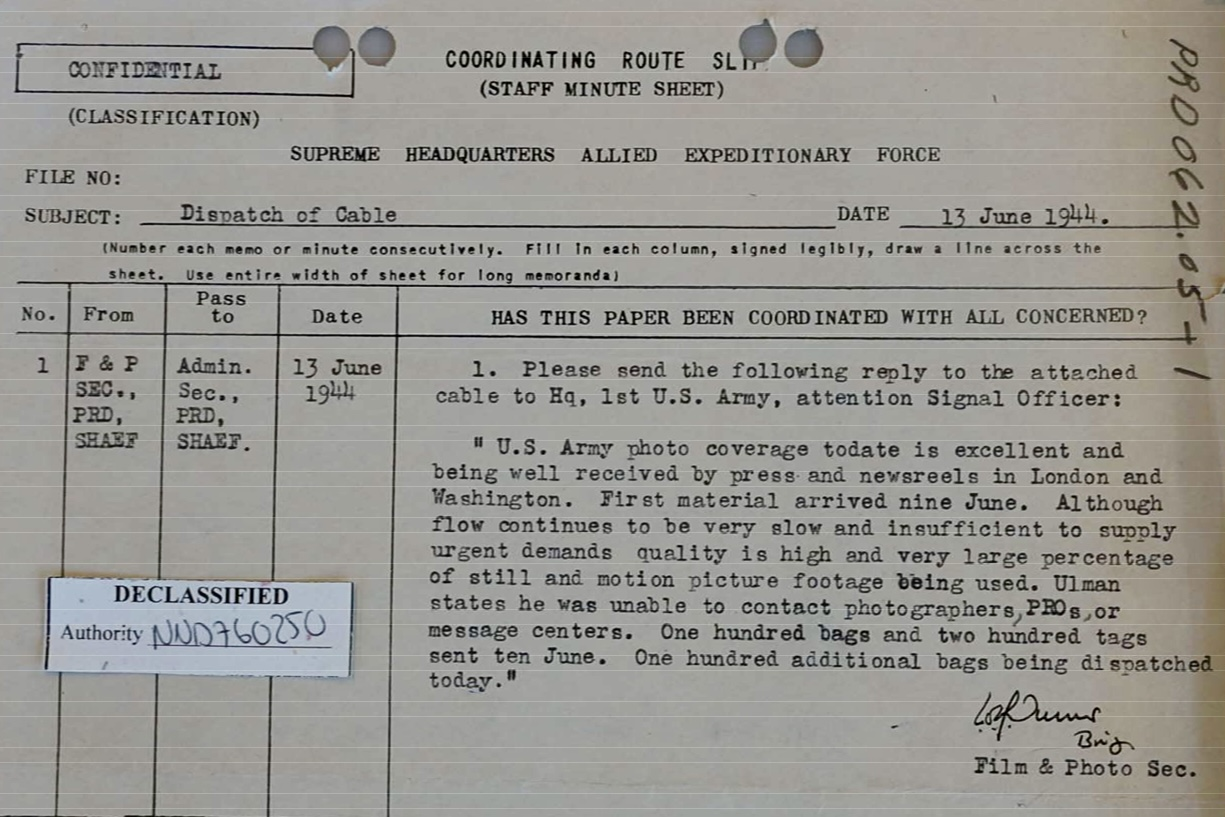
13 JUNE 1944: "Ulman states he was unable to contact photographers, PROs or message centers"

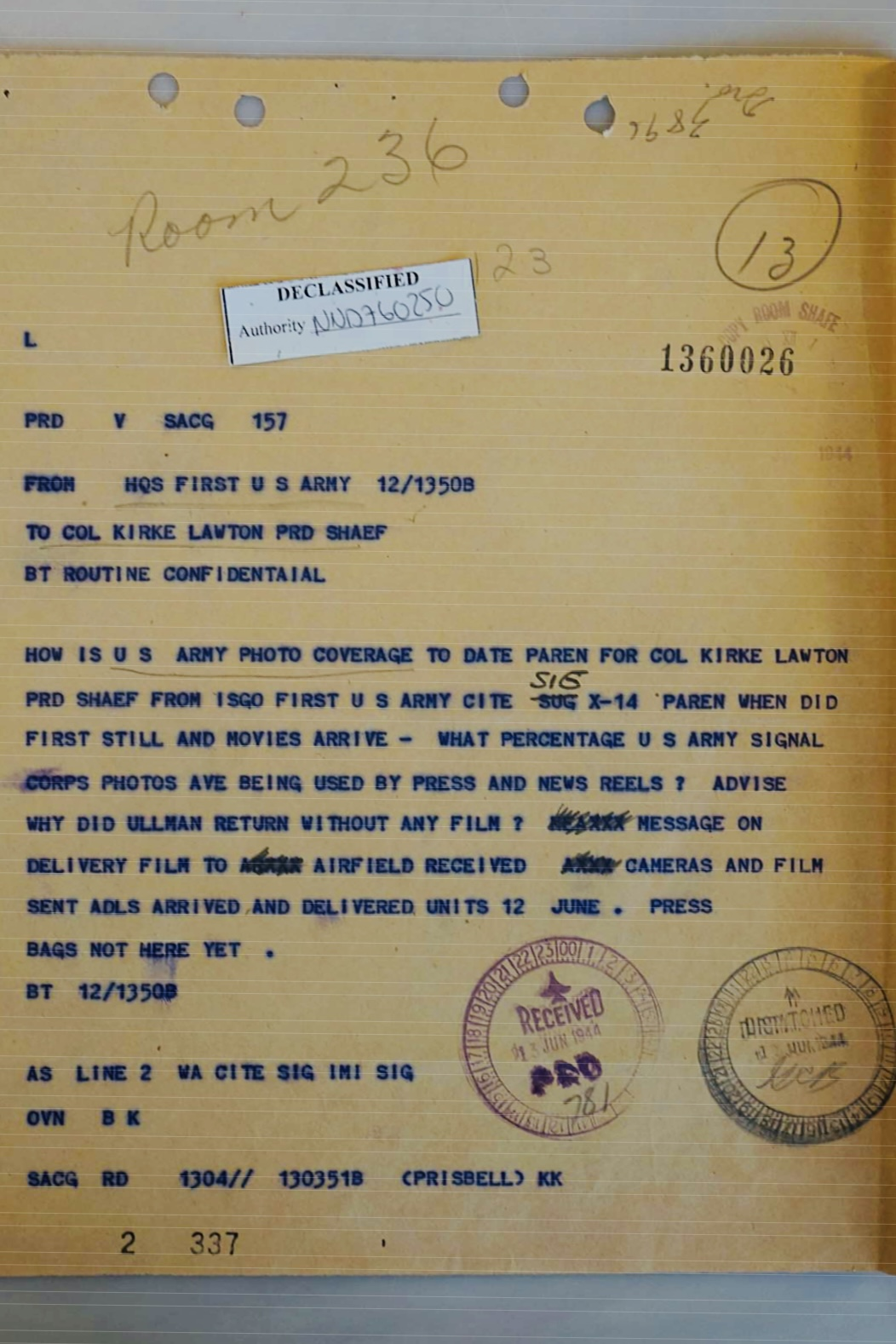
13 JUNE 1944: "ADVISE WHY DID ULLMAN RETURN WITHOUT ANY FILM ?"

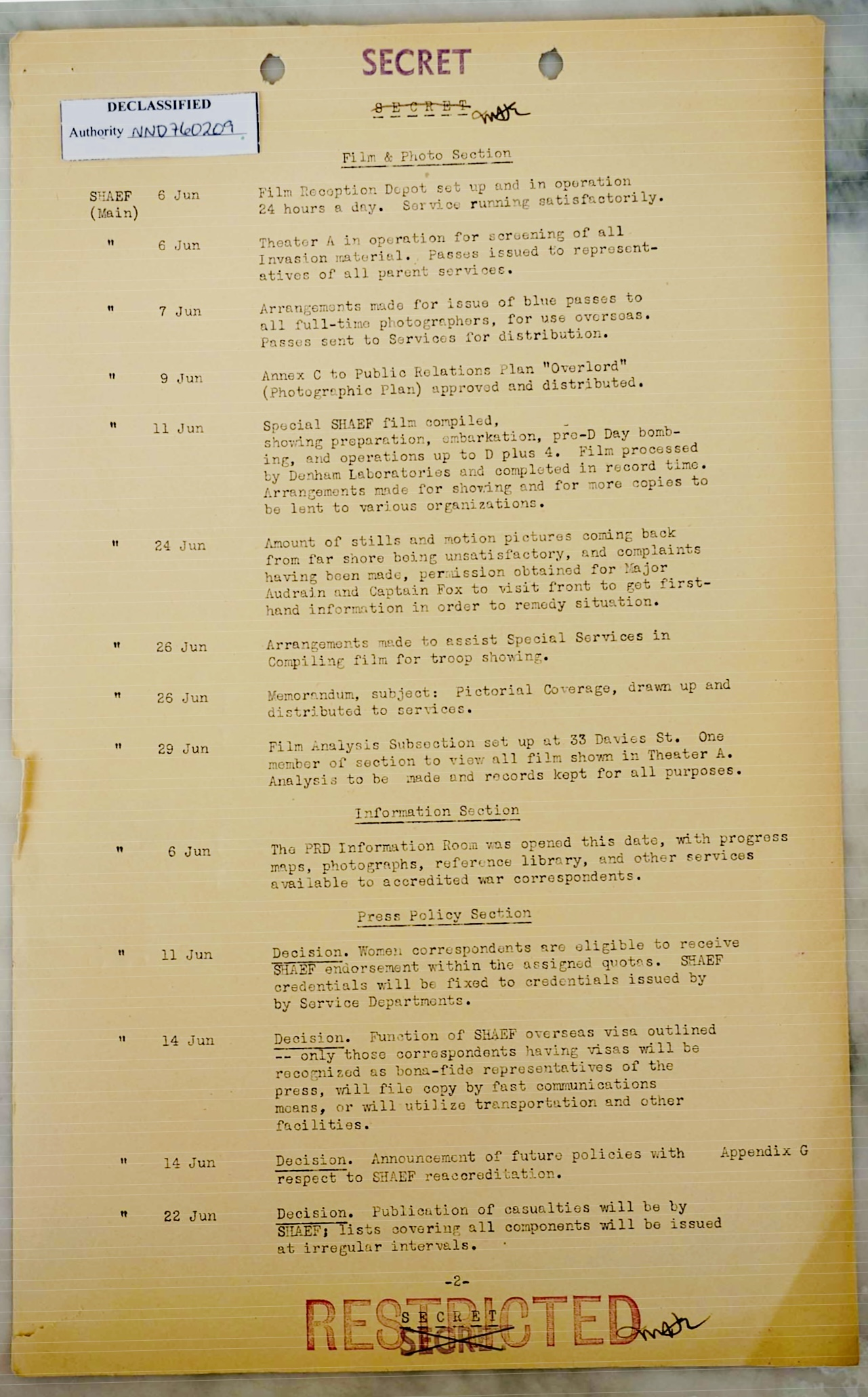
Timeline of photo and film unit action 6 June to 29 June 1944
