= Behind Prison Walls =

1943 film by Steve Sekely

- Theatrical release poster
- Directed by: Steve Sekely
- Screenplay by: Van Norcross
- Story by: William Ullman Jr.
- Produced by: Arthur Ripley
- Starring: Alan Baxter; Gertrude Michael; Tully Marshall; Edwin Maxwell; Jacqueline Dalya; Matt Willis
- Cinematography: Marcel Le Picard
- Edited by: Holbrook N. Todd
- Music by: Leo Erdody
- Production company: Producers Releasing Corporation
- Distributed by: Producers Releasing Corporation
- Release date: March 22, 1943
- Running time: 64 minutes
- Country: United States
- Language: English

Behind Prison Walls is a 1943 American crime film directed by Steve Sekely and written by Van Norcross. The film stars Alan Baxter, Gertrude Michael, Tully Marshall, Edwin Maxwell, Jacqueline Dalya and Matt Willis. The film was released on March 22, 1943, by Producers Releasing Corporation.

== Cast ==
- Alan Baxter as Jonathan MacGlennon
- Gertrude Michael as Elinor Cantwell
- Tully Marshall as James J. MacGlennon
- Edwin Maxwell as Percy Webb
- Jacqueline Dalya as Mimi
- Matt Willis as Frank Lucacelli
- Richard Kipling as Frederick Driscoll
- Olga Fabian as Yette Kropatchek
- Isabel Withers as Whitey O'Neil
- Lane Chandler as Reagan
- Paul Everton as Warden
- George Guhl as Doc
- Regina Wallace as Mrs. Cantwell
