= Sex Hygiene =

1942 short film directed by John Ford

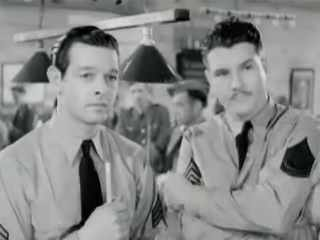
- Robert Lowery and George Reeves in United States War Department Official Training Film No. 8-154
- Directed by: Otto Brower (medical footage); John Ford (dramatic sequences)
- Written by: W. Ulman
- Produced by: Darryl F. Zanuck
- Starring: George Reeves; Richard Derr
- Cinematography: George Barnes; Charles G. Clarke
- Edited by: Gene Fowler Jr.
- Distributed by: U.S. Army Signal Corps
- Release date: February 1942
- Running time: 26 minutes
- Country: United States
- Language: English

Entire film

Sex Hygiene is a 1942 American drama film short directed by John Ford and Otto Brower. The official U.S. military training film is in the instructional social guidance film genre, offering adolescent and adult behavioural advice, medical information, and moral exhortations. The Academy Film Archive preserved Sex Hygiene in 2007.

== Plot ==
Several servicemen relax by playing pool at their base. One later visits a prostitute and contracts syphilis. As a result of his unfortunate experience, there is an opportunity for sexual health information about syphilis, how it is spread and how its spread can be prevented.

== Cast ==
- Kenneth Alexander as Soldier
- Robert Conway as Soldier
- Robert Cornell as Soldier
- Richard Derr as Soldier
- Herbert Gunn as Soldier
- Robert Lowery as Pool player No. 2
- George Reeves as First Sergeant.
- Robert Shaw as Pool player
- Charles Tannen as Soldier
- Charles Trowbridge as Medical officer
- Basil Walker as Soldier
- Robert Weldon as Soldier

== See also ==
- To the People of the United States
- List of Allied propaganda films of World War II
- Social guidance films
- List of sex hygiene films
