= Beachhead to Berlin =

1944 quasi-documentary D-Day film by Warner Brothers

WATCH: Beachhead to Berlin (1944)

Beachhead to Berlin is a 21-minute Technicolor film about the Normandy landings, a Vitaphone short produced by Warner Bros. and released on December 15, 1944.

The film makes extensive use of documentary footage of preparations and the beach landings shot by U.S. Coast Guard photographers. The fictionalized framing device is a Coast Guard chaplain's voice-over narration of a V-mail letter home. The film has been preserved and was digitized by the U.S. National Archives. Some of the beach landing footage was recorded by USCG Chief Photographer's Mate David T. Ruley at Omaha Beach in the vicinity of Easy Red sector, at about the same time as Robert Capa took his D-Day photos first published in Life magazine.

== See also ==
- John Ford's D-Day footage
