= Karen McDougal =

American model and actress (born 1971)

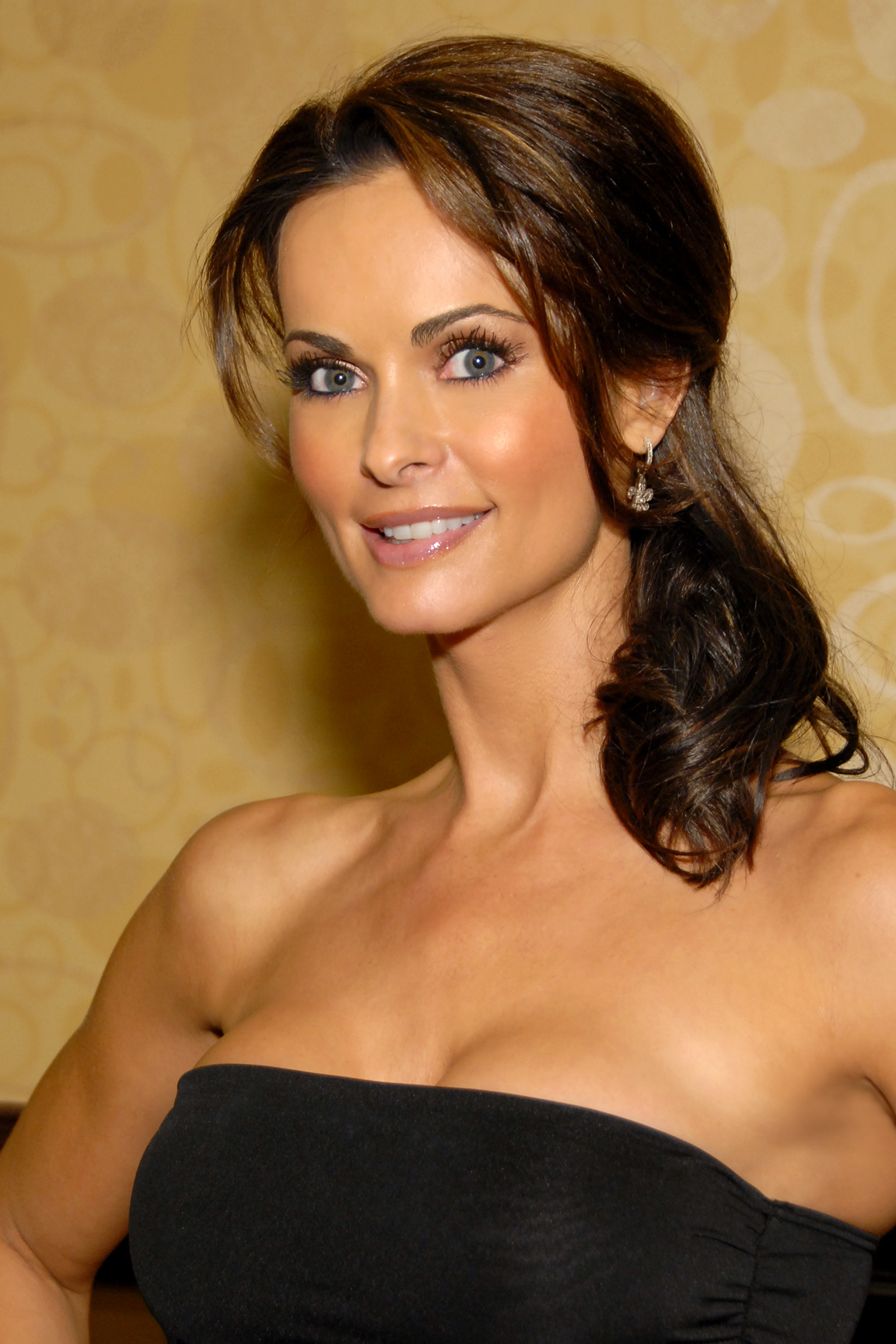
- McDougal in 2011
- Born: March 23, 1971 (age 55); Gary, Indiana, U.S.

Playboy centerfold appearance
- December 1997
- Preceded by: Inga Drozdova
- Succeeded by: Heather Kozar

Playboy Playmate of the Year
- 1998
- Preceded by: Victoria Silvstedt
- Succeeded by: Heather Kozar

Personal details
- Height: 5 ft 8 in (173 cm)
- Official website

Signature
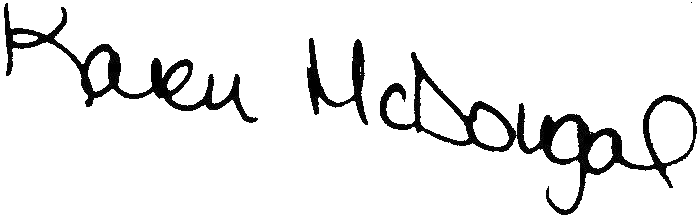

Karen McDougal (born March 23, 1971) is an American model and actress. She is known for her appearances in Playboy magazine as Playmate of the Month for December 1997 and Playmate of the Year in 1998, and for her alleged 10-month to year-long affair with Donald Trump before he became president. In 2001, the readers of Playboy voted McDougal the runner-up of "The sexiest Playmate of the 1990s".

McDougal taught pre-kindergarten before winning a swimwear competition that launched her career as a glamour, promotional, and swimsuit model. Since her appearances in Playboy, she extended her career into a wide variety of appearances in mainstream media, including other magazine modeling, television commercials, and minor acting, with mixed success. She has been a successful fitness model, with multiple magazine appearances, including as the first female cover figure on Men's Fitness magazine. She also starred in The Arena, a 2001 direct-to-video film, and inspired the creation of a fantasy art statuette and a doll.

McDougal is a fitness enthusiast, having studied ballet in her youth and engaged in high school sports. She is also an avid motorcycle and car collector. Since her Playmate days, she has maintained a largely private social life. The revelation of an alleged affair with Donald Trump from 2006 to 2007, and its subsequent coverup, put her into national headlines before and after the 2016 United States presidential election.

== Early life ==
McDougal was born in Merrillville, Indiana, near Gary. She self identifies as Cherokee, and is of Scottish, and Irish descent. She is the eldest daughter in the family, with three older brothers, Bob, Dave and Jeff, and a younger sister, Tina. Her mother, Carol, remarried when McDougal was nine years old, and the family moved to Sawyer, Michigan, where she remained until college.

McDougal studied tap dance and ballet as a child. Her childhood dream, prior to teaching and modeling, was to become a ballerina. She attended River Valley High School and became a cheerleader, a marching band member, a color guard member, and a volleyball and softball player, as well as Michigan state champion clarinet player, four years in a row in high school. Her high school nickname was "Barbie," due to her wholesome sweetness. After graduating from high school in 1989, she attended Ferris State University in Big Rapids, Michigan, majoring in elementary education.

After two years of college, McDougal moved to a Detroit suburb where she taught pre-kindergarten, before being persuaded to try out for a swimsuit competition. One of her professional goals has always been to open a learning center for children, but she put those aspirations on hold to focus on pursuing roles in acting and modeling.

== Modeling ==
McDougal's first modeling assignment was as a promotional model at a Harley-Davidson bike show in Detroit.

=== Playboy ===
In 1997, McDougal won a local swimsuit competition, promoted by Venus Swimwear in Michigan, earning her place at the international final in Florida. Her victory caught the eye of Playboy photographer David Mecey. Soon after, Playboy approached her, offering a test shoot at Playboy Studio West, which she accepted. Afterwards, she was promptly invited to return for a more complete photo and video shoot, and was ultimately chosen as Miss December 1997. Her pictorial, by photographers Richard Fegley and Stephen Wayda, has a winter theme and its outdoor portion was shot in snowy fields near Park City, Utah. Her video, the "Playmate Profile," was featured on Playboy TV soon after her magazine debut.

In May 1998, at a luncheon at the Playboy Mansion, it was announced that Hugh Hefner and fans had chosen her as 1998's Playmate of the Year (PMOY).

As part of becoming a PMOY, she received $100,000 and a special-edition silver Shelby Series 1 convertible with a customized Michigan license plate "PMOY 98." McDougal's PMOY pictorial was featured in the July 1998 issue of Playboy, where she also appeared on its cover. In contrast to her Playmate pictorial, her PMOY pictorial has a tropical theme, and its outdoor portion was shot in Saint Lucia. According to her interview in her Playmate of the Year "Video Centerfold," released soon after her PMOY issue debuted, she views as physical imperfections her "funny" smile, her crooked pinkies, inherited from her grandfather, and her "ugly feet," which she wishes others would not look at. Because of the popularity of the VH1 television series "Pop-up Video" at the time, one of the segments in her PMOY video was done as a Pop-up Video parody, filled with factoids about her and Playboy. During her appearance on The Magic Hour to promote her PMOY issue, McDougal demonstrated her signature pose, straddle split on TV in front of a live studio audience.

In an online chat in 2002, McDougal expressed interest in posing nude for Playboy again, if offered.

=== Fitness modeling ===
In March 1999, McDougal became the first woman to appear on the cover of Men's Fitness magazine. Since then she has expanded her career into fitness and bodybuilding magazines, such as Muscle & Fitness (January 2000), Physical (June 2004), and Iron Man (October 2005, January 2006, June 2007, and November 2009). She appeared in a 10-page pictorial in the January 2006 issue of Iron Man as "Hardbody" of the month, and on the cover of its October 2005 and June 2007 issues. McDougal returned as "Hardbody" of the month in the November 2009 issue in a pictorial together with fellow Playmate Katie Lohmann. In interviews, she said her transition to fitness modeling was unintentional.

=== Other appearances ===
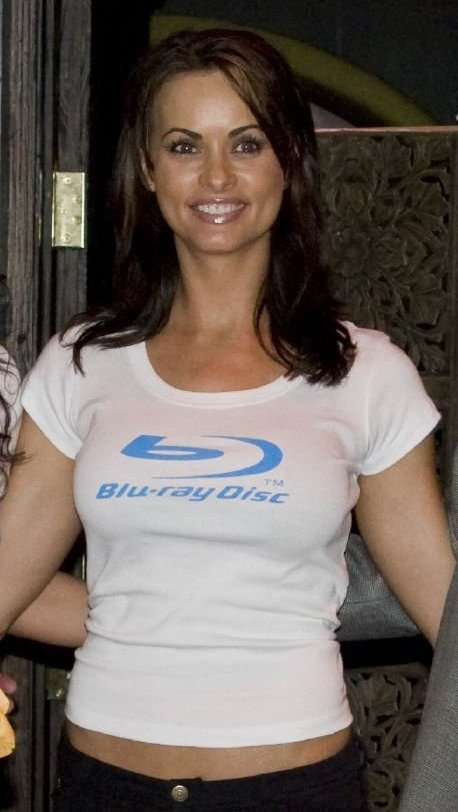
McDougal at the Home Theater Forum 2007 in Las Vegas

In 1999, McDougal was featured as the lead model for a print ad campaign for Patrón. Playboy released a Playboy Collectors' Figure Series limited edition doll in 2002 based on the likeness of McDougal and emphasized that it was an accurate model of her statuesque physique. Her collectors' figure was originally slated to be the first in the series to be released, however it was delayed due to redesigns. McDougal collaborated with fantasy sculptor Bill Toma in creating a limited edition bronze statuette titled Warrior Princess in 2003. McDougal posed for Toma in the creative process and the pedestal of each statuette bears her signature.

In early 2004, McDougal appeared in a photo spread in the Italian edition of Vogue with fellow Playmates, Pamela Anderson, Audra Lynn and Tishara Cousino. It was a tennis themed men's fashion spread shot in Las Vegas by photographer David LaChapelle. The spread contained her first published nudes since her contract with Playboy expired years earlier. She traveled to Japan to be one of the eye candies for the wrestling bout between Scott Hall and Kevin Nash (The Outsiders) at Yokohama, Japan in May 2004. McDougal also participated in the 50th Anniversary celebrations of Playboy throughout the year at Las Vegas, New York and Moscow with other Playmates past and present.

McDougal appeared in the 2005 Playmates at Play at the Playboy Mansion swimsuit calendar as the calendar girl of July. The calendar was the inaugural Playmates at Play calendar and it was shot on the grounds of Playboy Mansion in 2004. It was Playboy's first attempt at creating a non-nude swimsuit calendar featuring Playmates, similar in style with those from Sports Illustrated Swimsuit Issue. While all Playmates appeared in bikinis in the calendar, in the case of McDougal and Hiromi Oshima, the "bikinis" were actually only painted on using body paint.

In November 2006, McDougal was part of a trio of Playmates (along with Tina Marie Jordan and Katie Lohmann) that appeared in the "Celebrity Playmate Gift Guide" pictorial of Splat, a magazine for paintball enthusiasts. The pictorial showcased new paintball products for the 2006 holiday season. McDougal has also appeared in various pin-up posters, calendars, magazine covers, advertising campaigns, promotional events, clothing, swimwear and lingerie catalogs following her success as Playmate of the Year.

== Television and film ==
McDougal appeared in a series of sexy television commercials for XFL football league on NBC and UPN with the theme of "Cheerleaders". These edgy XFL commercials with implied nudity backfired and caused a controversy as they were deemed too risqué by the media, they were quietly withdrawn before the launch of 2001 XFL inaugural (and final) season; the footage was nonetheless repurposed later in the season as a publicity stunt for a halftime telecast.

In 2001, she co-starred with Lisa Dergan in The Arena, a Roger Corman-produced, direct-to-video movie directed by Timur Bekmambetov. The entire production was shot in Russia. In her feature film debut, McDougal's character, Jessemina, is a slave girl who is forced into fighting as a female gladiator in an Ancient Roman colony by its corrupt governor. The role offered McDougal her first opportunity to act in a dramatic role and to demonstrate her physical abilities with the movie's sword fighting sequences. The movie, initially titled Gladiatrix, was deemed to be a knockoff of Gladiator. Although the movie was not well received, it has turned into a lesser known cult film.

McDougal was one of 12 contestants in the search for the new host succeeding Brooke Burke for Wild On! in 2002 (known as Wild Off!). The contest took place at The Palms in Las Vegas. Each contestant was given a "wild" challenge to complete and McDougal's challenge was to dress up as Cleopatra and roam the casino at Caesars Palace in the arms of an actor dressed up as Julius Caesar for a day. She completed her challenge and was considered an early favorite by fellow contestants, but did not advance to the final round of five contestants. Cindy Taylor was the eventual winner of Wild Off!.

After winning a local try out in Los Angeles, McDougal advanced to the 2004 WWE Diva Search special held at the Beacon Theatre in New York as one of 28 finalists. The special was televised live on Spike TV on July 15, 2004. McDougal, clad in a black bikini, survived two rounds of elimination during the program, only to be eliminated by the judges in the last round at the end, just prior to the selection of the final 10 contestants eligible for online voting.

McDougal appeared as one of the interviewees in the April 9, 2006 episode of E! True Hollywood Story, which focused on Hugh Hefner. She briefly described her experience at the Playboy Mansion when she was Miss December 1997. In mid-2006, McDougal appeared as a fitness model demonstrating all the exercises in a fitness training DVD with Hollywood celebrity fitness trainer Valerie Waters.

She has guest hosted TV programs (Wild On! on E!, VIP Access on Showtime), appeared in other TV programs (such as: Lovespring International, Anger Management, The O'Reilly Factor, the Playmate edition of Russian Roulette, etc.), movies (cameos in Joe Dirt, Charlie's Angels, Grind, The Girl Next Door and Raising Helen) and music videos with singer David Lee Roth.

== Business venture ==
In 2010, McDougal became one of the owners of Pharmore Alternatives, a company selling various health and wellness supplements. She attended the 2011 AVN Adult Entertainment Expo in January 2011 to promote its products.

== Personal life ==
McDougal's family members did not initially support her decision to pose for Playboy. But eventually, they embraced the fact, and her mother appeared in interview segments of her Playmate of the Year "Video Centerfold" as a sign of support. When she was Playmate of the Year of 1998, she had a healthy BMI of 19.

In 2004, she bought a pink custom-built motorcycle and entered an Easyriders-sponsored motorcycle competition in Pomona, California, where her motorcycle won the Best Radical Custom award. She also professes to be a chocoholic and junk food addict, despite otherwise seeing herself as a "health nut." In her spare time, she exercises five days a week to stay in shape. She is an animal lover and has owned two cats: Brittany and Brandy. McDougal has two tattoos, one of a cat on the second toe of her right foot, honoring the felines in her life, and the other of a cross behind her right ear, a reminder of her spirituality.

As of 2007, McDougal lived in Los Angeles and Phoenix, Arizona. In March 2008, she appeared in a topless pictorial and interview in Spanish magazine Interviu, in which she discussed her then relationship with actor Bruce Willis.

Her family has a history of breast cancer, and McDougal, who had breast implants, is an advocate of breast cancer awareness. In January 2017, she had her own breast implants removed after her health had worsened.

In 2018, McDougal said she was registered as a Republican voter.

Although she is a swimsuit model, she is not a proficient swimmer, due to aquaphobia, or fear of water.

=== Affair with Donald Trump ===
In November 2016, The Wall Street Journal reported that McDougal had told a friend that she had an affair with a married Donald Trump from 2006 to 2007, with various sources quoting that it had lasted from ten months to a year. It also reported that American Media, Inc. (AMI), the owner of the National Enquirer, had paid McDougal $150,000 for exclusive rights to her story, but never published it. Cameron Stracher, as general counsel for AMI, wrote the contract. AMI stated to The Wall Street Journal that it had paid the amount to McDougal not "to kill damaging stories about" Trump, but for "exclusive life rights to any relationship she has had with a then-married man" and "two years' worth of her fitness columns and magazine covers". On June 20, 2016, Dylan Howard, chief content officer for AMI, interviewed McDougal for several hours at the offices of her lawyer. McDougal later met with investigative reporters from ABC News, which prompted AMI to offer to buy the rights to McDougal's story for $150,000 on August 5, 2016.

The Wall Street Journal published the story four days before the 2016 United States presidential election, in which Trump was the Republican Party nominee. Trump was endorsed by the National Enquirer, and was friends with AMI CEO/Chairman David Pecker. Hope Hicks, speaking for the Trump campaign, denied the existence of an affair between Trump and McDougal, saying that the notion was "totally untrue."

In February 2018, with Trump already elected as president, The New Yorker's Ronan Farrow wrote about the affair and AMI's purchase of the story, largely corroborating the 2016 Wall Street Journal report, except that the affair had gone on for nine months. The story was based on McDougal's handwritten memoirs of the affair, which McDougal's friend passed to Farrow. McDougal confirmed to Farrow that she had written the memoirs. Farrow quotes the memoirs as stating that McDougal first met Trump in June 2006 at a party hosted by Hugh Hefner at the Playboy Mansion. Trump kept in contact with McDougal, and they had sex on the first date. She said she met members of his family and he promised to buy her an apartment in New York. To avoid "paper trails", Trump had McDougal pay for flight and hotel expenses when she flew to meet him, then he reimbursed her. McDougal ended the affair in April 2007 because she felt guilty about sleeping with a married man; she was also offended by derogatory comments he made about her mother and a black man who was dating a female acquaintance of his.

McDougal declined to discuss details of the alleged affair due to her agreement with AMI, but she told Farrow that she regretted signing that agreement, saying, "It took my rights away... I don't know what I'm allowed to talk about. I'm afraid to even mention his name." Farrow also wrote that Pecker has a "favorite tactic" of buying "a story in order to bury it". AMI said it did not publish McDougal's story as it was not credible, and a spokesperson for the White House denied the affair.

On March 22, 2018, Anderson Cooper conducted an interview in which McDougal detailed the affair and apologized to Melania Trump. She said that Trump tried to give her money after they first had sex, that their relationship lasted 10 months, and that she visited Trump "many dozens of times".

In March 2018, McDougal filed a lawsuit against AMI in Los Angeles Superior Court, aiming to invalidate the non-disclosure agreement. On April 19, 2018, AMI settled with McDougal, which allowed her to speak about the alleged affair.

In July 2018, The New York Times reported that two months before the 2016 presidential election, Trump's personal lawyer, Michael Cohen, had secretly recorded a conversation between him and Trump regarding paying McDougal. Rudy Giuliani, then representing Trump in a personal capacity, said that Trump did not know of the recording and gave two versions of the topic of conversation, saying first that the protagonists planned to pay McDougal directly, then saying that they planned to pay AMI for the rights to McDougal's story. This appeared to contradict a previous claim by Hicks days before the election, when she responded to The Wall Street Journal report about the payment by saying, "we have no knowledge of any of this".

On July 25, Cohen's attorney Lanny Davis released the recording to CNN, which played it on the air. Trump and Cohen can be heard discussing how to make a payment for "all of that info regarding our friend David," ostensibly referring to Pecker. Trump is also heard asking if "one-fifty" needed to be paid, which Cohen confirms. McDougal was reportedly paid $150,000 by AMI. Davis stated that Cohen "achieved independence" on July 2, 2018, and was ready to admit the truth at this point.

In August 2018, Cohen pleaded guilty to breaking campaign finance laws, admitting paying hush money of $130,000 and $150,000 "at the direction of a candidate for federal office" to two women who alleged affairs with that candidate, "with the purpose of influencing the election". The figures match payments made to adult film actress Stormy Daniels and McDougal. Daniels also stated that she had had a 2006 affair with Trump. Trump responded to Cohen's claims by saying he only knew about the payments "later on", and that he paid back Cohen personally, not out of campaign funds. Pecker, Howard and Allen Weisselberg (chief financial officer of The Trump Organization) were reportedly granted witness immunity in exchange for their testimony regarding the payments.

In May 2019, the Southern District of New York was investigating the possible role of Trump and others regarding concealment of hush money payments.

In September 2019, it was reported the House Judiciary Committee was preparing to investigate Trump's alleged involvement in the 2016 hush-money payments to McDougal and Stormy Daniels.

In June 2021, the Federal Election Commission (FEC) found that the National Enquirer violated U.S. election laws and the $150,000 paid by AMI to McDougal amounted to an illegal campaign contribution. AMI agreed to a fine of $187,500. Because the FEC was equally divided on party lines, it could not pursue further investigation into Trump, who accordingly will not be punished or be the subject of further inquiry by the FEC. In March 2023, the Manhattan district attorney asked Trump to appear before a grand jury. Trump denounced the investigation as a "political Witch-Hunt, trying to take down the leading candidate, by far, in the Republican Party." Prosecutors have also questioned Trump's former attorney, Michael Cohen, who coordinated payments, alongside Trump's former political adviser, Kellyanne Conway.

In April 2024, Pecker testified during Trump's New York criminal trial how he, Howard and Cohen conspired to get The National Enquirer to acquire McDougal's story. Pecker stated that after Howard found out about McDougal's allegation, he sent Howard to California to interview her. During the time Howard met with McDougal, he conversed with Cohen about the situation. Ultimately, McDougal agreed to sell her story to the National Enquirer for $150,000.

McDougal's former attorney Keith Davidson would later testify on how he negotiated McDougal's $150,000 hush money payment on her behalf. Text messages which were shown to the trial's jury also showed how Davidson had conversations with Dylan Howard concerning the hush money negotiations.

On May 3, 2024, Hicks appeared to retract her previous denial of the affair while testifying during the Trump criminal trial in New York, stating that Trump not only sought to cover up the affair with McDougal, but even went as far as to draft a statement which addressed the affair allegation just before The Wall Street Journal was about to break the story that AMI paid off McDougal for her silence about the alleged affair. According to Hicks, Trump even sought to hide news reports of the alleged affair from his wife Melania. On May 13, 2024, the trial jury would hear the taped conversation between Trump and Cohen concerning McDougal's hush money payment. The same day, Cohen testified that he had asked Donald Trump how Melania would take the news of his affair with Stormy Daniels, and Trump responded "how long do you think I'll be on the market for? Not long." On May 14, 2024, Cohen testified that McDougal's hush money was undertaken "in order to ensure that the possibility of Mr. Trump succeeding in the election — that this would not be a hindrance" and that he did not alter the recording of the conversation.

=== Defamation lawsuit against Tucker Carlson ===
On December 5, 2019, McDougal filed a defamation lawsuit against Fox News. According to the suit, network anchor Tucker Carlson defamed McDougal by saying that she had personally extorted Trump for the hush money she received in 2016. McDougal denies this accusation. On September 24, 2020, Manhattan U.S. District Court Judge Mary Kay Vyskocil, a Trump appointee, dismissed the defamation lawsuit, writing: "The statements are rhetorical hyperbole and opinion commentary intended to frame a political debate, and, as such, are not actionable as defamation." The judge added that the "'general tenor' of the show should then inform a viewer that [Carlson] is not 'stating actual facts' about the topics he discusses and is instead engaging in 'exaggeration' and 'non-literal commentary.'" Fox News released a statement the same day, stating: "The decision is a victory not just for FOX News Media, but for all defenders of the First Amendment."

== See also ==
- List of people in Playboy 1990–1999
- 2017–18 United States political sexual scandals

Jami Ferrell	Kimber West	Jennifer Miriam	Kelly Monaco	Lynn Thomas	Carrie Stevens
Daphnée Duplaix	Kalin Olson	Nikki Ziering	Layla Roberts	Inga Drozdova	Karen McDougal
