= Vera Papisova =

Russian-American journalist

- Born: Vera Papisov; May 26, 1990 (age 36); Russia
- Occupation: Journalist
- Years active: 2008–present

Vera Papisova (born May 26, 1990) is a Russian-American journalist. Papisova was the first ever digital wellness features editor at Teen Vogue, and covered drug education, gender, identity, mental health, sexual health, sexuality, trauma, and wellness.

== Early life and education ==
Papisova was born in Russia to father Mikhail Papisov, a research scientist who specializes in molecular bioengineering and cancer drug development, and mother Elena Tokareva, a cardiologist and clinical researcher. Her family emigrated to the United States. Papisova grew up in the Boston area. She has a younger sister.

In 2008, Papisova graduated from Winchester High School in Winchester, Massachusetts, where she played doubles on the tennis team, winning the Division 2 state championship and listed as a national champion in the New England region.

In 2013, Papisova graduated from Boston University's College of Communication with a bachelor's degree in journalism.

== Career ==
While at Boston University, Papisova co-hosted a sex-positive radio show called "Girls’ Night In" with Allie Rosenberg on WTBU and wrote a blog about dating. She also worked at Massachusetts General Hospital, where she was an editor's assistant.

From 2014 to 2016, Papisova worked as a freelance writer. She wrote for Condé Nast's Teen Vogue, covering beauty and sexual health as well as for other publications, including Vice Media. From 2015 to 2016, Papisova wrote for Yahoo! Style.

From 2015 to 2016, Papisova worked as a columnist at Slutever.com, writing the column "Ask a Porn Star." She interviewed male and female porn stars about their experiences with sex and dating, working as a sex worker, and on issues relating to sexual health.

In March 2016 Teen Vogue editor Phillip Picardi hired Papisova for the newly created position of wellness editor, which also reflected the new launch of the wellness sector of Teen Vogue. The wellness vertical is the fastest growing vertical in the history of the Teen Vogue brand and features seven official subsections: health, mental health, fitness, nutrition, relationships, spirituality, and sexual health & identity. Papisova's work has been part of the magazine's shift towards social activism and empowerment since the sector was launched.

Papisova also ran the Teen Vogue sexual assault awareness campaign with the social media hashtag #NotYourFault. Not Your Fault is focused around a series of videos where men and women read about sexual assault and rape. As part of this campaign, Papisova's video series called Guys Read, and featured men reading sexist comments made about women and girls, won an American Society of Magazine Editors award.

In April 2018, Papisova attended three days of the 2018 Coachella Valley Music and Arts Festival in Indio, California to cover a sexual health app that provides verified STD results. During her time at the festival, she interviewed 54 women who had been sexually harassed and sexually assaulted at the festival. Papisova was also sexually harassed and sexually assaulted, saying she was groped 22 times over 10 hours she was at the festival. Papisova published an article about her experience on Teen Vogue.

Papisova documented the aftermath of reporting and coming forward about the experience on social media and, when the article came out, discussing the experience in interviews. She said that it illustrates online harassment and the double-victimization that victims of sexual harassment typically face. Responses ranged from asking what Papisova was wearing to slut shaming to receiving rape threats and death threats.

In February 2025, Papisova published an article in Cosmopolitan that documented her experience going on far-right dating apps dating conservatives over the course of 2024. This piece was widely circulated as it provided a first hand account into the behaviors of far-right men in the dating scene. She matched with 60 men and went on dates with at least five men. The six men she mentioned in the article included: a man who has sent her death threats, a man with a swastika tattoo on his arm, a man who funds a crisis pregnancy center, and a man who touched her inappropriately in a church on a first date.

== Personal life ==
While an undergraduate student at Boston University, Papisova worked in restaurant jobs, which she continued to do after graduating and working as a freelance journalist. After his death in June 2018, Papisova said that Anthony Bourdain had seen a busboy sexually harassing her at her job. Bourdain reported it to Papisova's manager, who had up until that point not addressed the issue.

In 2013, while living in Boston and going to college, Papisova witnessed the 2013 Boston Marathon bombing from a nearby rooftop.

Papisova lives in Brooklyn.

She speaks Russian.

== Awards and honors ==
- 20YY: Planned Parenthood, Maggie Award for Excellence in Youth Media for the sexual assault awareness campaign #NotYourFault
- 20YY: Webby Award for the Body Parts series which celebrates body diversity amongst all genders
- 20YY: National Institute of Reproductive Health, Champion of Choice
- 20YY: Planned Parenthood, Truth Seeker
- 2017: American Society of Magazine Editors, Ellies for Video (finalist) for Guys Read video series
- 2017: GLAAD, GLAAD Media Award for Outstanding Magazine Coverage
- 2018: Shorty Awards, 1st Annual Shorty Social Good Awards – Video (finalist)

== Selected works and publications ==
- Papisova, Vera (March 4, 2015). "Meet Erika Lust: The Feminist Porn Director Who Gives TEDx Talks". Yahoo! Style.
- Papisova, Vera (June 10, 2015). "Ask a Porn Star: Dale Cooper". Slutever.
- Papisova, Vera (June 12, 2015). "Designer Billy Reid on Mentoring, John Legend & Baseball". Yahoo! Style.
- Papisova, Vera (August 26, 2015). "Meet the Girl Who's Changing the Condom Industry". Teen Vogue.
- Papisova, Vera (September 23, 2015). "Ask a Porn Star: Vanessa Veracruz". Slutever.
- Papisova, Vera (September 26, 2015). "11 Things Every Girl Should Know About Sex and Sexual Assault in College". Teen Vogue.
- Papisova, Vera (September 30, 2015). "Find Out When Most Teens Are Losing Their Virginity". Teen Vogue.
- Papisova, Vera (December 18, 2015). "If You Think Your Vagina Smells Weird, This is Probably Why". Slutever.
- Papisova, Vera (March 21, 2016). "The President of Planned Parenthood Opens Up About Fighting for Reproductive Rights". Vice.
- Papisova, Vera (April 14, 2017). "Joe Biden Says Men Who Don't Stop Sexual Assault Are 'Cowards'". Teen Vogue.
- Papisova, Vera (April 18, 2018). "I Talked to 54 Women at Coachella. They All Said They Had Been Sexually Harassed". Teen Vogue.
- Papisova, Vera (April 29, 2018). "Watch What Happens When Guys Read Real Stories of Sexual Assault". Teen Vogue.
- Papisova, Vera (April 30, 2018). "Thank You Cecile Richards". Teen Vogue.
- Papisova, Vera (June 16, 2018). "The Haim Sisters Open Up About Their Firsthand Experiences With Harassment and Unequal Pay". Teen Vogue.
- Papisova, Vera (April 22, 2018). "Amandla Stenberg Opens Up About Using They/Them Gender Pronouns". Teen Vogue.
