= Nick Mitchell (personal trainer) =

British personal trainer and fitness writer

Nick Mitchell is a British personal trainer and fitness writer.

== Career ==
Mitchell holds two undergraduate degrees in English Literature and Law and in 2009 he set up the first Ultimate Performance (U.P.) personal training gym in London.

In 2017, Mitchell moved to Los Angeles to open U.P. gyms in the United States, beginning with a gym in this city. The Los Angeles gym opened in 2018.

Ultimate Performance currently operates personal training gyms in nine countries across Europe, Asia, the Middle East, Australasia and the United States. Mitchell is Global CEO of Ultimate Performance which has its base of operations in Manchester, England.

He has written and been featured in articles in Men's Health, Men's Fitness, The Daily Telegraph, The Huffington Post, The Independent, AskMen and MailOnline, writing about fitness, exercise, personal training, diet and nutrition.

== Books ==
Mitchell wrote his first book in 2012, Men's Fitness 12 Week Body Plan, in collaboration with Joe Warner, the Editor of Men's Fitness.

His first two books, Men's Fitness 12 Week Body Plan and Your Ultimate Body Transformation Plan, both reached Number 2 in the Amazon bestseller list. His books have been translated into multiple languages, including Chinese.

In 2017, Mitchell published his third book, the first in the U.P. Encyclopaedia of Personal Training series: Principles of Muscle Building Program Design with Body Transformation Meal Plan Design. In 2018 he followed up with Volume 2 of the series.
