= Playboy =

American lifestyle and entertainment magazine

- Editor-in-Chief: Phillip Picardi
- Categories: Men's magazines
- Frequency: Monthly (1953–2016); Bimonthly (2017–2018); Quarterly (2019–2020; 2025–present)
- Publisher: PLBY Group
- Total circulation: 400,000 (2017)
- Founder: Hugh Hefner
- Founded: 1953
- First issue: December 1, 1953
- Country: United States
- Based in: Beverly Hills, California
- Language: English
- Website: Official website
- ISSN: 0032-1478

Playboy (stylized in all caps) is an American men's lifestyle and entertainment magazine, available both online and in print. It was founded in Chicago in 1953 by Hugh Hefner and his associates, funded in part by a US$1,000 loan (equivalent to $12,000 in 2025) from Hefner's mother.

Known for its centerfolds of nude and semi-nude female models (Playmates), Playboy played an important role in the sexual revolution and remains one of the world's best-known brands, with a presence in nearly every medium. In addition to the flagship magazine in the United States, special nation-specific versions of Playboy are published worldwide, including those by licensees, such as Dirk Steenekamp's DHS Media Group. (Note: Attributed to multiple references:)

The magazine regularly published interviews with prominent celebrities, authors, and politicians, as well as short stories by novelists such as Arthur C. Clarke, Ian Fleming, Vladimir Nabokov, Saul Bellow, Chuck Palahniuk, P. G. Wodehouse, Roald Dahl, Haruki Murakami, and Margaret Atwood. With a regular display of full-page color cartoons, it became a showcase for cartoonists such as Jack Cole, Eldon Dedini, Jules Feiffer, Harvey Kurtzman, Shel Silverstein, Doug Sneyd, Erich Sokol, Roy Raymonde, Gahan Wilson, and Rowland B. Wilson. Art Paul designed the bunny logo. LeRoy Neiman drew the Femlin characters for Playboy jokes. Patrick Nagel painted the headers for Playboy Forum and other sections.

After a year-long removal of most nude photos in Playboy magazine, the March–April 2017 issue brought back nudity.

== Publication history ==
=== 1950s ===
Hugh Hefner graduated from the University of Illinois in 1949 with a psychology degree. He subsequently worked for Esquire magazine in Chicago writing promotional copy; for Publisher's Development Corporation in sales and marketing; and for Children's Activities magazine as circulation promotions manager. By spring 1953, he had planned out the elements of a magazine that he planned to call Stag Party. He formed HMH Publishing Corporation, and recruited his friend Eldon Sellers to find investors. Hefner eventually raised just over US$8,000 (equivalent to $96,000 in 2025), which included funds from his brother and mother. However, the publisher of Stag, an unrelated men's adventure magazine, informed Hefner that his publication would file suit to protect its trademark if Hefner launched his magazine with the name Stag Party. Hefner, his wife Millie, and Sellers met to seek a new name, considering "Top Hat", "Gentleman", "Sir'", "Satyr", "Pan", and "Bachelor" before Sellers suggested "Playboy".

Published in December 1953, the first issue was undated, as Hefner was unsure there would be a second. He produced it in his Hyde Park kitchen. The first centerfold was Marilyn Monroe, although the photograph used had been taken for a calendar rather than for Playboy. Hefner chose what he deemed the "sexiest" image, a previously unused nude study of Monroe stretched with an upraised arm on a red velvet background with closed eyes and mouth open. Heavy promotion for the magazine centered on Monroe's nudity on the already-famous calendar, making Playboy a success, with the first issue selling out within weeks. The cover price was 50¢ and known circulation was 53,991. In 2002, copies of the first issue in mint or near-mint condition sold for over US$5,000 (equivalent to $9,000 in 2025).

In 1954, Playboy serialized the classic Ray Bradbury sci fi novel Fahrenheit 451 (published in 1953 to little fanfare), in the March, April, and May 1954 issues, significantly boosting the work's popularity.

An urban legend started about Hefner and the Playmate of the Month because of markings on the front covers of the magazine. From 1955 to 1979 (except for a six-month gap in 1976), the "P" in Playboy had stars printed in or around the letter. Urban legend stated that this was either a rating that Hefner gave to the Playmate according to how attractive she was, the number of times that Hefner had had sex with her, or how good she was in bed. In truth, stars, between zero and 12, indicated the domestic or international advertising region for that printing.

=== 1960s–1990s ===
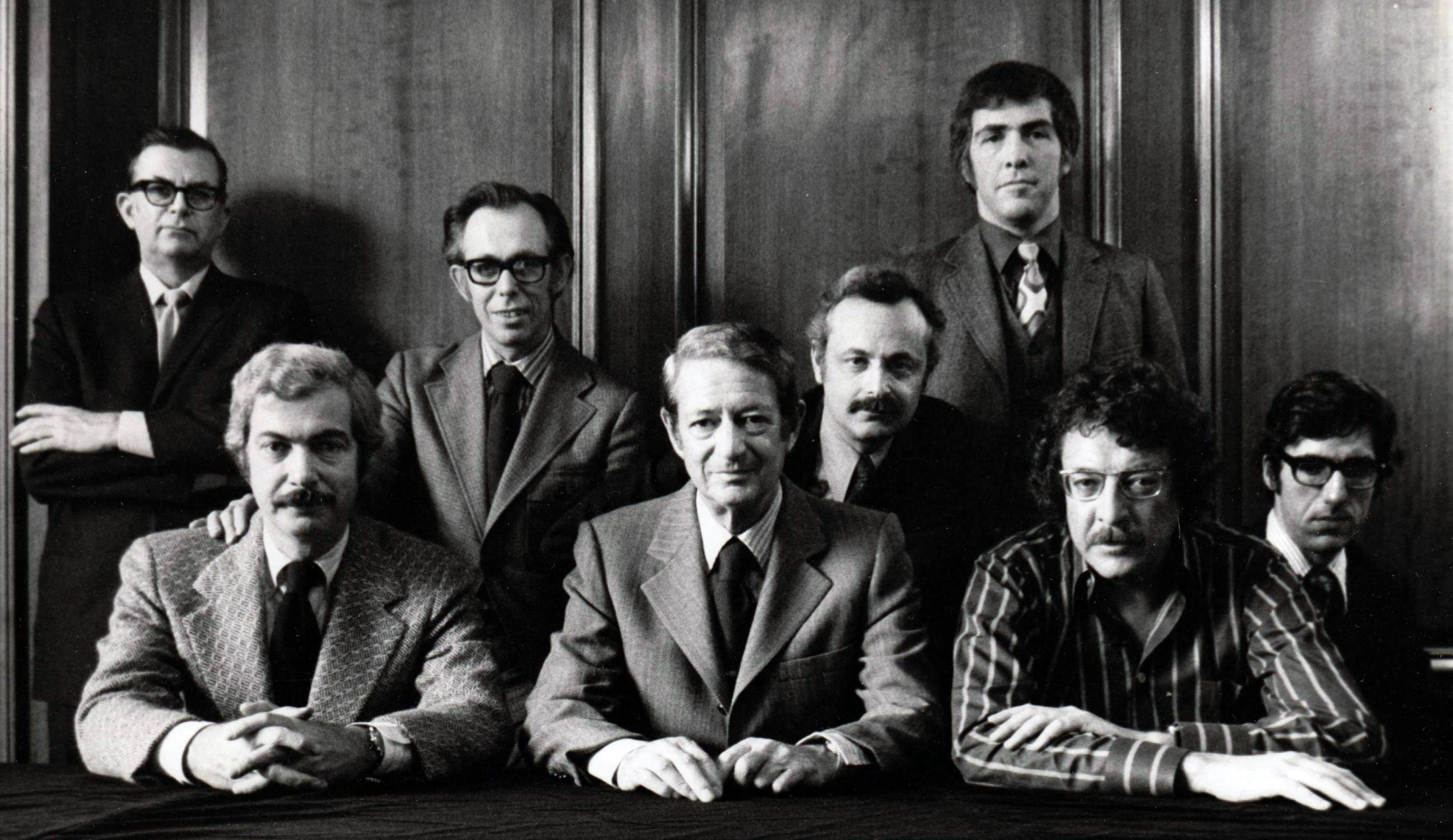
The editorial board of Playboy in 1970. Back, left to right: Robie Macauley, Nat Lehrman, Richard M. Koff, Murray Fisher, Arthur Kretchmer; front: Sheldon Wax, Auguste Comte Spectorsky, Jack Kessie.

In the 1960s, the magazine added "The Playboy Philosophy" column. Early topics included gay rights, women's rights, censorship, and the First Amendment. Playboy was an early proponent of cannabis reform and provided founding support to the National Organization for the Reform of Marijuana Laws in 1970.

From 1966 to 1976, Robie Macauley was the fiction editor at Playboy. During this period the magazine published fiction by Saul Bellow, Seán Ó Faoláin, John Updike, James Dickey, John Cheever, Doris Lessing, Joyce Carol Oates, Vladimir Nabokov, Michael Crichton, John le Carré, Irwin Shaw, Jean Shepherd, Arthur Koestler, Isaac Bashevis Singer, Bernard Malamud, John Irving, Anne Sexton, Nadine Gordimer, Kurt Vonnegut and J. P. Donleavy, as well as poetry by Yevgeny Yevtushenko.

In 1968, at the feminist Miss America protest, symbolically feminine products were thrown into a "Freedom Trash Can". These included copies of Playboy and Cosmopolitan magazines. One of the key pamphlets produced by the protesters was "No More Miss America!", by Robin Morgan, which listed ten characteristics of the Miss America pageant that the authors believed degraded women; it compared the pageant to Playboy's centerfold as sisters under the skin, describing this as "The Unbeatable Madonna–Whore Combination".

After reaching its peak in the 1970s, Playboy saw a decline in circulation and cultural relevance due to competition in the field it founded—first from Penthouse, then from Oui (which was published as a spin-off of Playboy) and Gallery in the 1970s; later from pornographic videos; and more recently from lad mags such as Maxim, FHM, and Stuff. In response, Playboy attempted to re-assert its hold on the 18–35-year-old male demographic through slight changes to the content and focusing on issues and personalities more appropriate to its audience—such as hip-hop artists being featured in the "Playboy Interview". In February 1974, Ratna Assan became the first woman of Indonesian descent to be featured, shortly after a positively received role in the film Papillon (1973). In October 1976, Eva Ionesco became the youngest person to ever be featured in the magazine at the age of 11, in the Italian edition. In the same year, Playboy issued a book publication (not the magazine), which contained nude photographs of the 10 year old Brooke Shields.

Christie Hefner, daughter of founder Hugh Hefner, was employed by the company that published Playboy magazine beginning in 1975. In 1988, she became the company's chief executive officer. In December 2008, Ms. Heffner announced that she would resign from the company effective in January 2009. She explained that the election of Barack Obama as the next President had inspired her to devote more time to charitable work and that the decision to resign was her own. "Just as this country is embracing change in the form of new leadership, I have decided that now is the time to make changes in my own life as well", she said. Ms. Hefner was succeeded by company director and media veteran Jerome H. Kern as interim CEO, who was in turn succeeded by publisher Scott Flanders.

=== 2000–2024: Continued decline, death of Hugh Hefner, and cessation of publication ===
The magazine celebrated its 50th anniversary with the January 2004 issue. Celebrations were held at Las Vegas, Los Angeles, New York, and Moscow during the year to commemorate this event. Playboy also launched limited-edition products designed by fashion houses such as Versace, Vivienne Westwood and Sean John. As an homage to the magazine's 50th anniversary, MAC Cosmetics released two limited-edition products: lipstick and glitter cream.

The printed magazine ran several annual features and ratings. One of the most popular was its annual ranking of the top "party schools" among all U.S. universities and colleges. In 2009, the magazine used five criteria—bikini, brains, campus, sex, and sports—to develop its list. The top-ranked party school by Playboy for 2009 was the University of Miami.

In June 2009, the magazine reduced its publication schedule to 11 yearly issues, with a combined July/August issue. On August 11, 2009, London's Daily Telegraph newspaper reported that Hugh Hefner had sold his English manor house (next door to the Playboy Mansion in Los Angeles) for $18 m ($10 m less than the reported asking price) to another American, Daren Metropoulos, and that due to significant losses in the company's value (down from $1 billion in 2000 to $84 million in 2009), the Playboy publishing empire was for sale for $300 million. In December 2009, the publication schedule was reduced to 10 issues per year, with a combined January/February issue.

On July 12, 2010, Playboy Enterprises Inc. announced Hefner's $5.50 per share offer ($122.5 million based on shares outstanding on April 30 and the closing price on July 9) to buy the portion of the company he did not already own and take the company private with the help of Rizvi Traverse Management LLC. The company derived much of its income from licensing rather than from the magazine. On July 15, Penthouse owner FriendFinder Networks Inc. offered $210 million (the company is valued at $185 million). However, Hefner, who already owned 70 percent of voting stock, did not want to sell. In January 2011, the publisher of Playboy magazine agreed to an offer by Hefner to take the company private for $6.15 per share, an 18 percent premium over the price of the last previous day of trading. The buyout was completed in March 2011.

This is what I always intended Playboy Magazine to look like.

— Hugh Hefner, when asked about ending nudity in Playboy

In October 2015, Playboy announced the magazine would no longer feature full-frontal nudity beginning with the March 2016 issue. Company CEO Scott Flanders acknowledged the magazine's inability to compete with freely available internet pornography and nudity; according to him, "You're now one click away from every sex act imaginable for free. And so it's just passé at this juncture". Hefner agreed with the decision. The redesigned Playboy, however, would still feature a Playmate of the Month and pictures of women. Still, they would be rated as not appropriate for children under 13. The move would not affect PlayboyPlus.com (which features nudity at a paid subscription). Josh Horwitz of Quartz argued that the motivation for the decision to remove nudity from the magazine was to give Playboy Licensing a less inappropriate image in India and China, where the brand is a popular item on apparel and thus generates significant revenue.

Other changes to the magazine included ending the popular jokes section and the various cartoons that appeared throughout the magazine. The redesign eliminated the use of jump copy (articles continuing on non-consecutive pages), eliminating most of the space for cartoons. Hefner, himself a former cartoonist, reportedly resisted dropping the cartoons more than the nudity, but ultimately obliged. Playboy's plans were to market itself as a competitor to Vanity Fair, as opposed to more traditional competitors GQ and Maxim.

Playboy announced in February 2017, however, that the dropping of nudity had been a mistake. Furthermore, for its March/April issue, it reestablished some of its franchises, including the Playboy Philosophy and Party Jokes, but dropped the subtitle "Entertainment for Men", inasmuch as gender roles have evolved. The company's chief creative officer made the announcement on Twitter with the hashtag #NakedIsNormal.

In early 2018, and according to Jim Puzzanghera of the Los Angeles Times, Playboy was reportedly "considering killing the print magazine", as the publication "has lost as much as $7 million annually in recent years". However, in the July/August 2018 issue a reader asked if the print magazine would discontinue, and Playboy responded that it was not going anywhere.

Following Hefner's death and his family's financial stake in the company, the magazine changed direction. In 2019, Playboy was relaunched as a quarterly publication without advertisements. Topics covered included an interview with Tarana Burke, a profile of Pete Buttigieg, coverage of BDSM, and a cover photo representing gender and sexual fluidity.

In March 2020, Ben Kohn, CEO of Playboy Enterprises, announced that the spring 2020 issue would be the last regularly scheduled printed issue and that the magazine would publish its content online. The decision to close the print edition was attributed in part to the COVID-19 pandemic, which interfered with the distribution of the magazine.

In Autumn 2020, Playboy announced a reverse merger deal with Mountain Crest Acquisition Corp.—a special purpose acquisition company (SPAC). In February 2021, the stock of a combined company, PLBY Group, began trading on the Nasdaq exchange as "PLBY".

=== 2025–present: Revival and Picardi appointment ===
In February 2025, Playboy was relaunched as an annual publication under the leadership of Mike Guy. The magazine switched to a quarterly print schedule with the release of its Winter 2025 issue featuring Jane Birkin on the cover. Guy exited the magazine at the end of 2025. It was then announced that Playboy headquarters would move from Los Angeles to Miami Beach by September 2026, along with plans to open a new Playboy Club in Miami Beach.

Phillip Picardi was appointed editor-in-chief of Playboy in March 2026; Picardi had previously edited Out and Them, and served as the digital editorial director of Teen Vogue. Following his appointment Picardi stated to Adweek on joining the magazine "The idea that we need a publication that is able to explain sexuality as a cultural force, especially as our younger folks are facing a sex recession and loneliness epidemic—it felt like the right challenge."

=== Circulation history and statistics ===
In 1971, Playboy had a circulation rate base of seven million, which was its high point. The best-selling individual issue was the November 1972 edition, which sold 7,161,561 copies. One-quarter of all American college men were buying or subscribing to the magazine every month. On the cover was model Pam Rawlings, photographed by Rowland Scherman. Perhaps coincidentally, a cropped image of the issue's centerfold (which featured Lena Söderberg) became a de facto standard image for testing image processing algorithms. It is known simply as the "Lenna" (also "Lena") image in that field. In 1972, Playboy was the ninth highest circulation magazine in the United States.

The 1975 average circulation was 5.6 million; by 1981, it was 5.2 million and by 1982 down to 4.9 million. Its decline continued in later decades and reached about 800,000 copies per issue in late 2015, and 400,000 copies by December 2017.

In 1970, Playboy became the first gentleman's magazine printed in braille. It is also one of the few magazines whose microfilm format was in color, not black and white.

=== Editors ===
Editor	Start year	End year
Hugh Hefner	1953	2017
Mike Guy	2024	2025
Phillip Picardi	2026	present

== Features and format ==
=== Rabbit logo ===
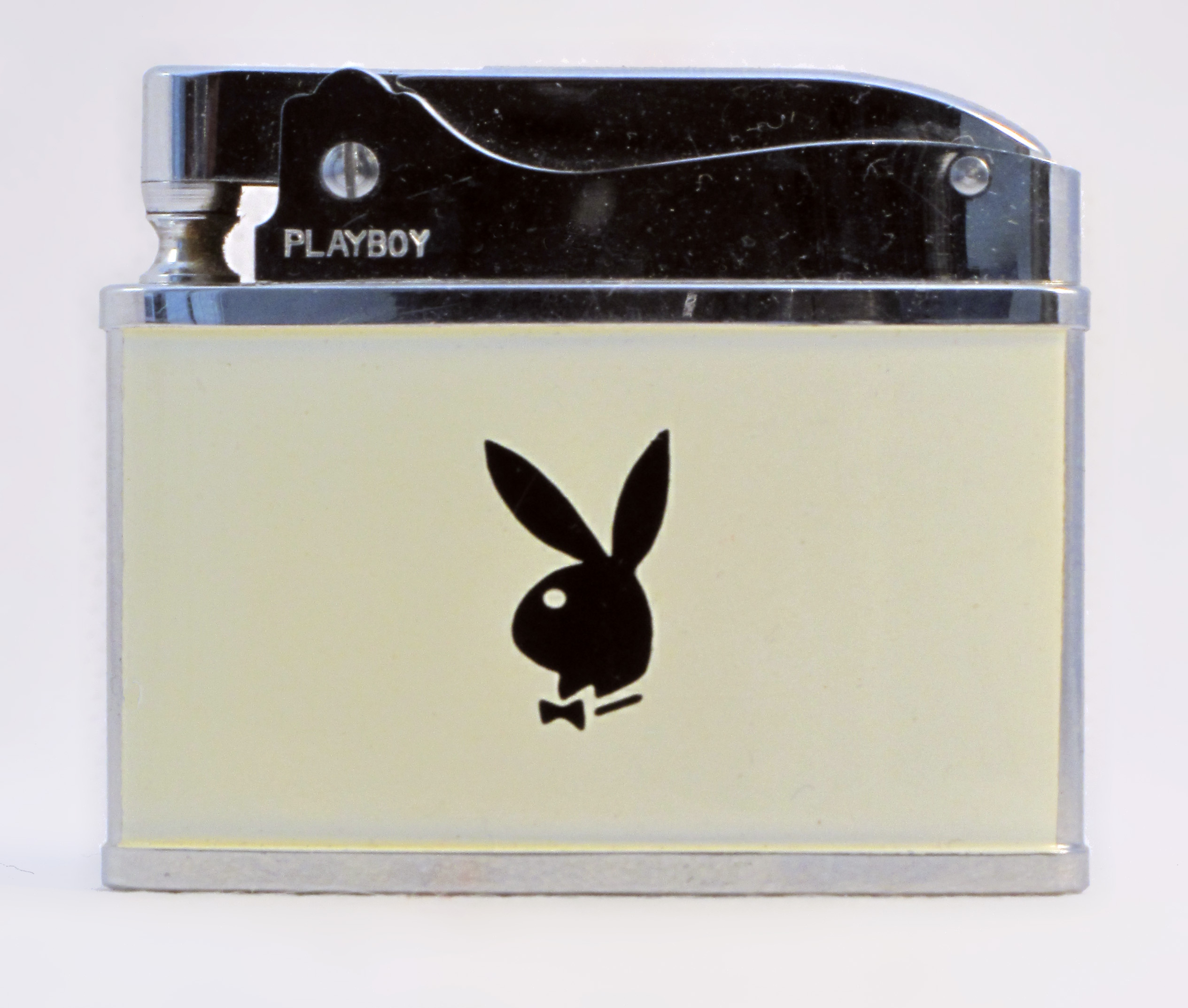
A Playboy cigarette lighter with the rabbit logo

Playboy's enduring mascot, a stylized silhouette of a rabbit wearing a tuxedo bow tie, was created by Playboy art director Art Paul for the second issue as an endnote, but was adopted as the official logo and has appeared ever since. A running joke in the magazine involves hiding the logo somewhere in the cover art or photograph. Hefner said he chose the rabbit for its "humorous sexual connotation" and because the image was "frisky and playful". In an interview, Hefner explained his choice of a rabbit as Playboy's logo to the Italian journalist Oriana Fallaci:

The rabbit, the bunny, in America has a sexual meaning; and I chose it because it's a fresh animal, shy, vivacious, jumping - sexy. First it smells you then it escapes, then it comes back, and you feel like caressing it, playing with it. A girl resembles a bunny. Joyful, joking. Consider the girl we made popular: the Playmate of the Month. She is never sophisticated, a girl you cannot really have. She is a young, healthy, simple girl - the girl next door ... we are not interested in the mysterious, difficult woman, the femme fatale, who wears elegant underwear, with lace, and she is sad, and somehow mentally filthy. The Playboy girl has no lace, no underwear, she is naked, well washed with soap and water, and she is happy.

Sports Illustrated swimsuit model Kylie Bax wearing a Playboy shirt, with Donald Trump, Bill Clinton and Melania Trump (2000)

The jaunty rabbit quickly became a popular symbol of extroverted male culture, becoming a lucrative source of merchandizing revenue for the company. In the 1950s, it was adopted as the military aircraft insignia for the US Navy's Air Test and Evaluation Squadron Four (VX-4).

=== The Playboy Interview ===
Besides its centerfold, a major part of Playboy for much of its existence has been the Playboy Interview, an extensive (usually several-thousand-word) discussion between a publicly known individual and an interviewer. Writer Alex Haley served as a Playboy interviewer on a few occasions; one of his interviews was with Martin Luther King Jr.; he also interviewed Malcolm X and American Nazi Party founder George Lincoln Rockwell. The magazine interviewed then-presidential candidate Jimmy Carter in the November 1976 issue, in which he stated "I've committed adultery in my heart many times." David Sheff's interview with John Lennon and Yoko Ono appeared in the January 1981 issue, which was on newsstands at the time of Lennon's murder; the interview was later published in book format.

Another interview-type section, entitled "20Q" (a play on the game of Twenty Questions), was added in October 1978. Cheryl Tiegs was the first interviewee for the section.

=== Rock the Rabbit ===
"Rock the Rabbit" was an annual music news and pictorial feature published in the March edition. The pictorial featured images of rock bands photographed by music photographer Mick Rock. Fashion designers participated in the Rock the Rabbit event by designing T-shirts inspired by Playboy's rabbit head logo for each band. The shirts were sold at Playboy's retailers and auctioned off to raise money for AIDS research and treatment at LIFEbeat: The Music Industry Fights AIDS. Bands who were featured include: MGMT, Daft Punk, Iggy Pop, Duran Duran, The Flaming Lips, Snow Patrol, and The Killers.

=== Photographers ===
The photographers who have contributed to Playboy include Mario Casilli, Ana Dias, Richard Fegley, Arny Freytag, Ron Harris, Tom Kelley, Annie Leibovitz, Ken Marcus, David Mecey, Russ Meyer, Helmut Newton, Pompeo Posar, Suze Randall, Herb Ritts, Ellen von Unwerth, Stephen Wayda, Sam Wu, and Bunny Yeager.

=== Celebrities ===
Many celebrities (singers, actresses, models, etc.) have posed for Playboy over the years. This list is only a small portion of those who have posed. Some of them are:

Film:

- Jayne Mansfield (February 1955)
- Mara Corday (October 1958)
- Ursula Andress (June 1965)
- Carol Lynley (March 1965)
- Margot Kidder (March 1975)
- Kim Basinger (February 1983)
- Terry Moore (August 1984)
- Janet Jones (March 1987)
- Drew Barrymore (January 1995)
- Denise Richards (December 2004)
- Sasha Grey (October 2010)

Music:

- La Toya Jackson (March 1989/Nov 1991)
- Fem2Fem (December 1993)
- Nancy Sinatra (May 1995)
- Samantha Fox (October 1996)
- Joey Heatherton (April 1997)
- Linda Brava (April 1998)
- Belinda Carlisle (August 2001)
- Tiffany (April 2002)
- Carnie Wilson (August 2003)
- Debbie Gibson (March 2005)

Sports:

- Svetlana Khorkina (November 1997 Russian edition)
- Katarina Witt (December 1998)
- Tanja Szewczenko (April 1999 German edition)
- Joanie Laurer (November 2000 and January 2002)
- Gabrielle Reece (January 2001)
- Kiana Tom (May 2002)
- Torrie Wilson (May 2003 and March 2004 [the latter with Sable])
- Amy Acuff (September 2004)
- Amanda Beard (July 2007)
- Ashley Harkleroad (August 2008)

Television:

- Linda Evans (July 1971)
- Suzanne Somers (February 1980 and December 1984)
- Teri Copley (November 1990)
- Dian Parkinson (December 1991 and May 1993)
- Shannen Doherty (March 1994 and December 2003)
- Farrah Fawcett (December 1995 and July 1997)
- Claudia Christian (October 1999)
- Shari Belafonte (September 2000)
- Brooke Burke (May 2001 and November 2004)
- Karina Smirnoff (May 2011)

== Other editions ==
=== Playboy Special Editions ===
The success of Playboy magazine has led PEI to market other versions of the magazine, the Special Editions (formerly called Newsstand Specials), such as Playboy's College Girls and Playboy's Book of Lingerie, as well as the Playboy video collection.

=== Braille ===
The National Library Service for the Blind and Physically Handicapped (NLS) has published a braille edition of Playboy since 1970. The braille version includes all the written words in the non-braille magazine, but no pictorial representations. Congress cut off funding for the braille magazine translation in 1985, but U.S. District Court Judge Thomas Hogan reversed the decision on First Amendment grounds.

=== International editions ===
Currently operating (print)

- Germany (1972–present)
- France (1973–1985, 1993–2013, 2016–2025, 2026–present)
- Netherlands (1983–present)

Currently operating (digital)

- Mexico (1976–1998, 2002–present)

Ceased publication

Africa
- South Africa (1993–1996, 2011–2016, 2017–2026)
- Africa (2017–2026)

Asia

- Japan (1975–2009)
- Hong Kong (1986–1993)
- Indonesia (2006–2007)
- Philippines (2008–2021)
- Singapore (2009, 2011)
- Mongolia (2012–2015)
- Israel (2013)
- Taiwan (2012–2020)
- Thailand (2012–2020)
- South Korea (2017–2020)

South America

- Brazil (1975–2017)
- Argentina (1985–1995, 2006–2018)
- Venezuela (2006–2017)
- Colombia (2008–2011, 2017–2020)

Europe

- Italy (1972–1985, 1987–2003, 2008–2020)
- Spain (1978–2013, 2017–2020)
- Greece (1985–2015, 2018–2019)
- Turkey (1986–1995)
- Hungary (1989–1993, 1999–2019)
- Czech Republic (1991–2025)
- Poland (1992–2019)
- Russia (1995–2022)
- Croatia (1997–2020)
- Norway (1997–1999)
- Slovakia (1997–2003, 2005–2020)
- Sweden (1998–1999, 2017–2026)
- Romania (1999–2016)
- Slovenia (2001–2020)
- Bulgaria (2002–2020)
- Serbia (2004–2015)
- Ukraine (2005–2022)
- Estonia (2007–2012)
- Georgia (2007–2008)
- Lithuania (2008–2013)
- Portugal (2009–2010, 2012–2013, 2015–2020)
- Latvia (2010–2014)
- Macedonia (2010–2012)
- Moldova (2012)
- Austria (2012–2014)
- Denmark (2018–2026)
- Norway (2022–2026)
- Belarus (2024–2024)
- Finland (–2026)

Oceania

- Australia (1979–2000, 2018–2026)
- New Zealand (2019–2026)

=== Online ===
The growth of the Internet prompted the magazine to develop an official internet presence called Playboy Online in the late 1980s. The company launched Playboy.com, the official website for Playboy Enterprises and an online companion to Playboy magazine, in 1994. As part of the online presence, Playboy developed a pay web site called the Playboy Cyber Club in 1995 which features online chats, additional pictorials, videos of Playmates and Playboy Cyber Girls that are not featured in the magazine. Archives of past Playboy articles and interviews are also included. In September 2005, Playboy began publishing a digital version of the magazine.

In 2010, Playboy introduced The Smoking Jacket, a safe-for-work website designed to appeal to young men, while avoiding nude images or key words that would cause the site to be filtered or otherwise prohibited in the workplace.

In May 2011, Playboy introduced iplayboy.com, a complete, uncensored version of its near-700-issue archive, targeting the Apple iPad. By launching the archive as a web app, Playboy was able to circumvent both Apple's App Store content restrictions and their 30% subscription fee.

== Litigation and legal issues ==
In 1966, Jane Fonda filed a $17.5 million lawsuit against Playboy for publishing nude photos without her consent. As part of her settlement, the February 1971 issue contained a full-page ad in support of the Vietnam Veterans Against the War.

Stacy Arthur, Playboy's Playmate of the Month for January, 1991, filed a $70 million lawsuit against Playboy Enterprises Inc. and others alleging she was raped and sodomized by three Playboy employees on October 6, 1991, at the Playboy mansion in Los Angeles and that inaction by the magazine led to the death of her husband.

On January 14, 2004, the Ninth Circuit U.S. Court of Appeals ruled that Playboy Enterprises Inc.'s trademark terms "Playboy" and "Playmate" should be protected in the situation where a user typing "Playboy" or "Playmate" in a browser search was instead shown advertisements of companies that competed with PEI. This decision reversed an earlier district court ruling. The suit started on April 15, 1999, when Playboy sued Excite Inc. and Netscape for trademark infringement.

In 2020, Playboy sued Fashion Nova, alleging that they copied their Playboy Bunny costume. In 2021, the two reached a settlement agreement.

=== Censorship ===
Many in the American religious community opposed the publication of Playboy. The Louisiana pastor and author L. L. Clover wrote in his 1974 treatise, Evil Spirits, Intellectualism and Logic, that Playboy encouraged young men to view themselves as "pleasure-seeking individuals for whom sex is fun and women are play things."

In many parts of Asia, including India, mainland China, Myanmar, Malaysia, Thailand, Singapore, and Brunei, sale and distribution of Playboy is banned. In addition, sale and distribution is banned in most Muslim countries (except Lebanon and Turkey) including Iran, Saudi Arabia, and Pakistan. Despite the ban on the magazine in these countries, the official Playboy brand itself can still appear on various merchandise, such as perfume and deodorants.

While banned in mainland China, the magazine is sold in Hong Kong. In Japan, where genitals of models cannot be shown, a separate edition was published under license by Shueisha. An Indonesian edition was launched in April 2006, but controversy started before the first issue hit the stands. Though the publisher said the content of the Indonesian edition will be different from the original edition, the government tried to ban it by using anti-pornography rules. A Muslim organization, the Islamic Defenders Front, opposed Playboy on the grounds of pornography. On April 12, about 150 Islamic Defenders Front members clashed with police and stoned the editorial offices. Despite this, the edition quickly sold out. On April 6, 2007, the chief judge of the case dismissed the charges because they had been incorrectly filed.

In 1986, the American convenience store chain 7-Eleven removed the magazine. The store returned Playboy to its shelves in late 2003. 7-Eleven had also been selling Penthouse and other similar magazines before the ban.

In 1995, Playboy was returned to shelves in the Republic of Ireland after a 36-year ban, despite staunch opposition from many women's groups.

Playboy was not sold in the state of Queensland, Australia, during 2004 and 2005, but returned as of 2006. Due to declining sales, the last Australia-wide edition of Playboy was the January 2000 issue.

In 2013, Playboy was cleared by the Pentagon of violating its rule against selling sexually explicit material on military property, but the base exchanges stopped selling it anyway.

In March 2018, Playboy announced that they would be deactivating their Facebook accounts due to the "sexually repressive" nature of the social media platform and their mismanagement of user data resulting from the Cambridge Analytica problem.

== Female perspectives and experiences ==
=== Gloria Steinem ===
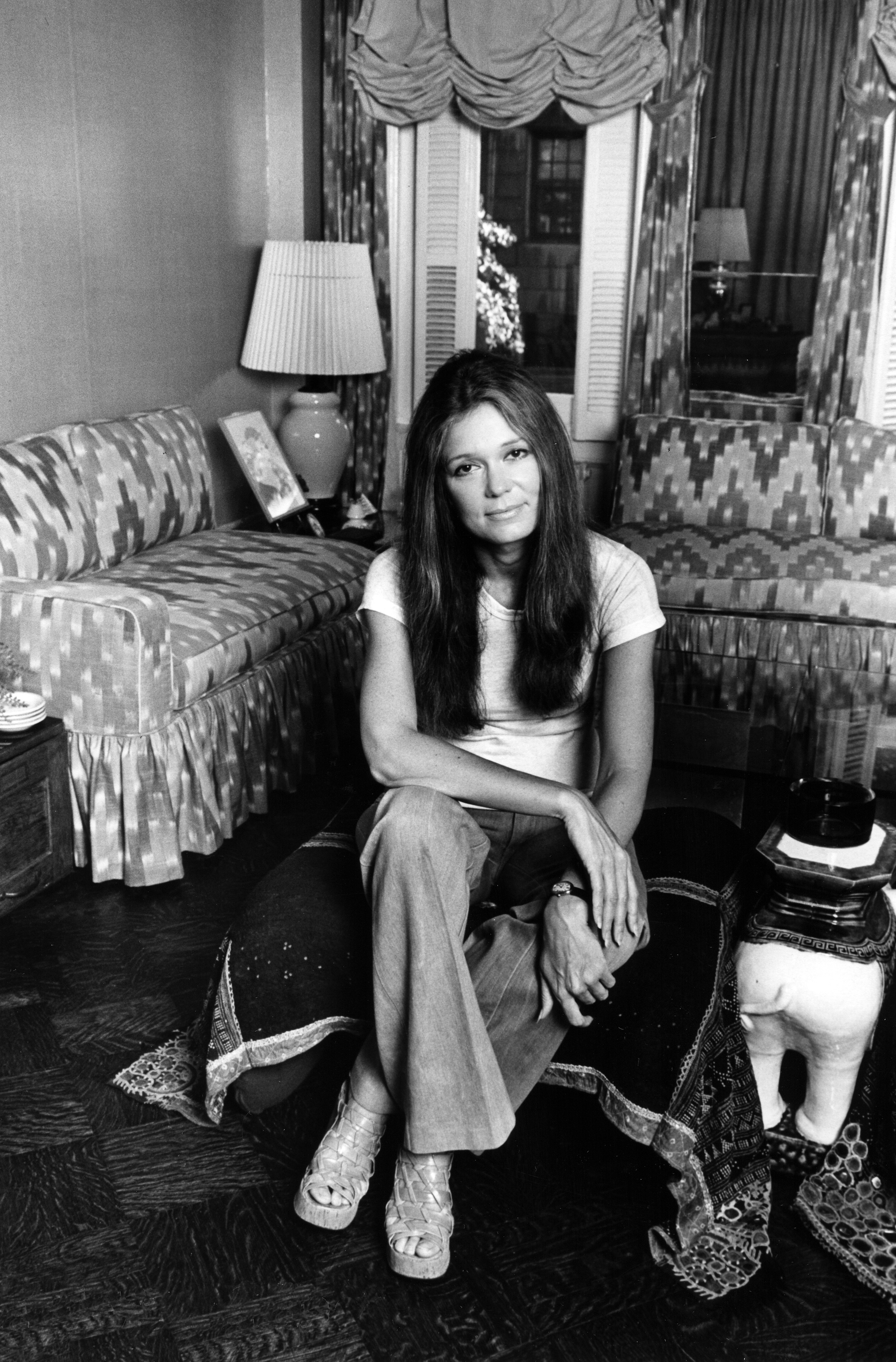
Gloria Steinem in 1977, photographed in her home, years after writing her Playboy expose

Gloria Steinem, an American activist and journalist, went undercover as an employee in 1963 at the New York City Playboy club. The same year she wrote an expose article called "A Bunny's Tale", discussing the inner-workings of a Playboy Bunny, which was later turned into a TV film. Steinem, going by the cover name of Marie Cathrine Ochs, applied for the job of a Playboy bunny. Her goal was to research and investigate the alleged mistreatment and harassment of women at the Playboy club. Steinem prepared a whole background story, very careful not to be discovered. Steinem arrived at the club in New York City, and filled out an application to be a Playboy Bunny. When applying, she was told that as a 24-year-old, she was considered relatively old to work there. Additionally, Steinem detailed how Playboy didn't want any backstory, but just wanted their employees to be a pretty face for the company. When applying, Steinem was told the expectations of the workers. Bunnies had to maintain a certain level of personal maintenance, such as always having their makeup, nails and hair done without flaws. The Bunnies were instructed to always be perceived as happy and optimistic. They were also expected to weigh a certain amount, and to have a certain bust size, or else they would get fined. There was a club motto that the Bunnies were hired for 1. Beauty 2. Personality 3. Ability, and the order was very important. Steinem was hired on the spot, and told to come back in a few days for training. She was given the "Bunny Bible", a rulebook with all the etiquette information. The club had fine lines around prostitution. No Bunny could seem interested or available to customers, however if a top client or a "key-holder" expressed interest, they were encouraged and suggested to comply. Additionally, the club would take 50% of tips earned from the first $30 of the night, 25% of tips up to $60 and 5% of tips after that.

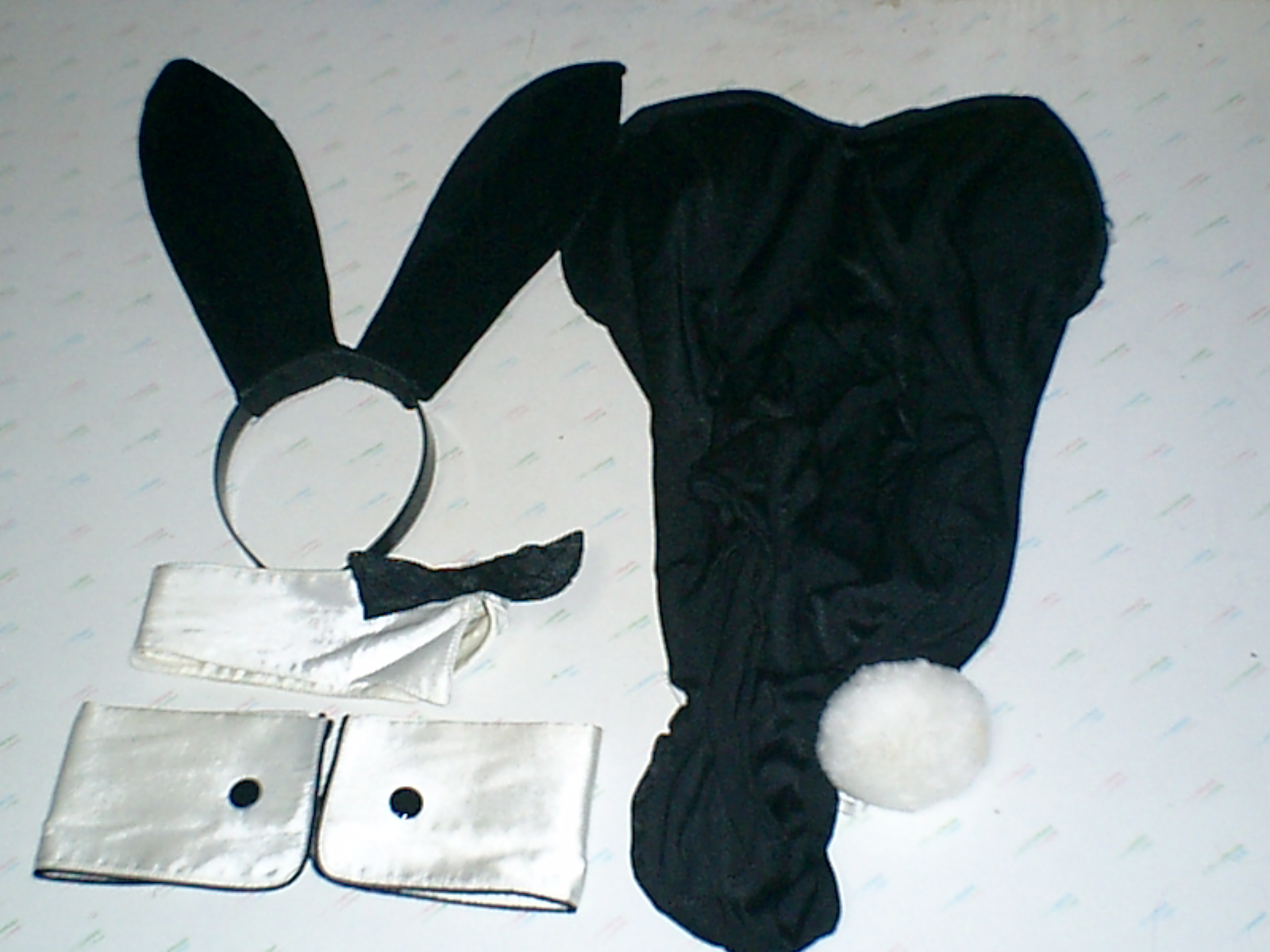
Bunny Girl outfit, worn by employees of the Playboy clubs.

Steinem detailed many forms of harassment she allegedly received during training, including customers touching her costume, putting their arm around her, breathing heavily down her neck, along with multiple instances of being yelled at when refusing to go home with a customer. Steinem claimed to have worked long night shifts in uncomfortable clothing, with no breaks or food. The Bunnies were told they would make around $200–300 a week, when in reality they had to share tips and they were underpaid. Steinem also observed and noted in her expose how Bunnies of color were called "Chocolate Bunnies" and were given lower ranking jobs in the club.

=== Jennifer Saginor ===
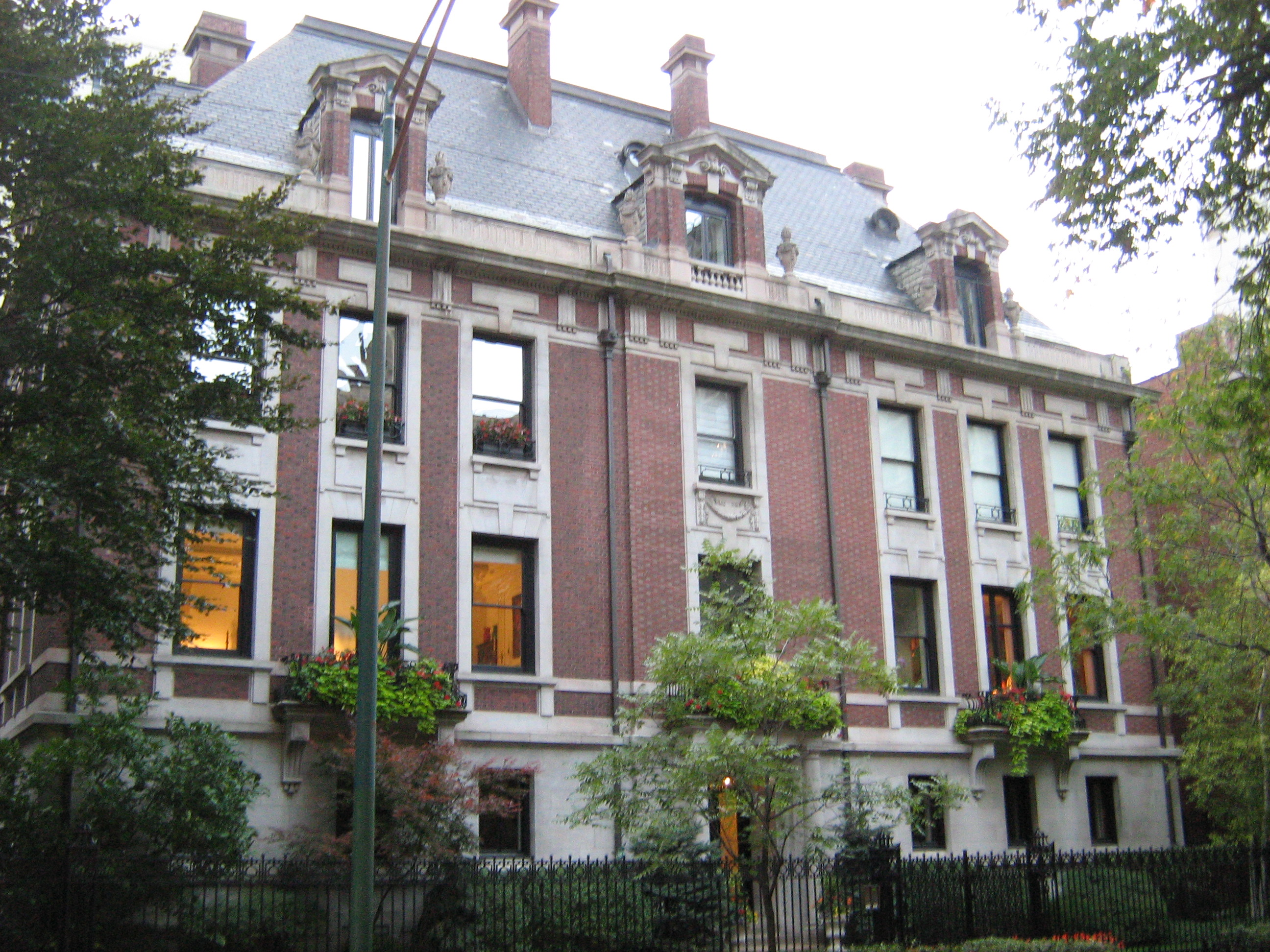
The Original Playboy Mansion. Located in Chicago, Illinois.

Jennifer Saginor, author of her memoir Playground: A Childhood Lost Inside the Playboy Mansion, experienced the infamous Playboy mansion at the age of six years old for the first time. Her father, Mark Saginor, was Hugh Hefner's physician, otherwise known as "Dr. Feelgood". Dr. Saginor was the primary reason that Saginor was introduced to the mansion at such a young age due to his residency there. While her parents were still together, Saginor and her sister would spend a good amount of time at the mansion with their father, having a plethora of adult experiences sprung on them at a young age. Her mother fought, trying to prevent her daughters from stepping foot into that mansion. She went as far as getting a divorce with "Dr. Feelgood", hoping for full custody, as well as court orders.

After Saginor's parents' divorce, Dr. Saginor spent significantly more time at the mansion than prior, bringing his children along with him. No matter how often her mother would forbid them from going, Saginor would lie about her whereabouts to spend time at the "playhouse". Saginor yearned for her father's love and affection, so, she would insist on going to the mansion with him. Unfortunately for Saginor, this would lead to years of processing her broken childhood, which she is continuing to work on in present times.

A specific story that Saginor references in her memoir is, again, at the age of six when she ventures to the mansion for the first time, meeting Hugh Hefner, and is left to her own devices by her father. As she walked through the mansion, surrounded by half-naked strangers, she ran into the butler who showed her to the pool. Once getting to the pool, Saginor discovered a secret tunnel under the water, leading to an underground Jacuzzi in a separate section of the house. Here, she walked in on John Belushi having sexual intercourse with one of the Playboy Bunnies. She was six years old at the time, but describes her response to this experience as "I am no longer six. I have grown to full maturity in a matter of seconds." Throughout the rest of her book, she discusses several stories involving herself and others, sharing what really went down in the mansion during her time residing there, including the sexual relationship she was involved in with one of Hugh Hefner's girlfriends.

=== Sondra Theodore ===
Sondra Theodore, Hugh Hefner's girlfriend from 1979 to 1981, lived with Hefner in his mansion with her children throughout the duration of her relationship. One of the most famous playboy bunnies, Theodore was featured on the cover of Playboy in 1977 and had many centerfold photo shoots throughout her time as a Playboy bunny. In the documentary series Secrets of Playboy, she spoke out about her experience and the mistreatment she received during her time in the house. Theodore also spoke about her experience in a joint interview with her daughter for People magazine. In the interview they discuss the vastly different experiences and perspectives they had living in the mansion.

In the documentary, Theodore spoke about the pressure she felt to engage in sexual acts, not only with Hefner, but also with other men and women who frequented the house. She also alleged that she was forced to be a "drug mule" for Hefner, stating that he forced her to retrieve drugs, including cocaine, for his personal use. Many other former bunnies called out Theodore saying that she was "chasing fame" and alleging that her accusations were false due to the fact that she didn't speak out for years. The backlash that Theodore faced was in part due to the fact that after their split she remained on good terms with Hefner. She ended up marrying a close friend of Hefner. She also returned to the mansion many times after her split with Hefner and when she eventually divorced her husband it was Hefner who gave her money for a divorce lawyer. Their close friendship, even after their romantic relationship ended, led many to question the validity of Theodore's story. In the documentary Theodore acknowledges how she waited to speak out due to blocking out traumatic memories and believing that she didn't have a voice. The documentary gave her and other former bunnies a chance to share their experiences. In response to Theodore's allegations and the documentary in general, Playboy released an open letter stating that "today's Playboy is not Hugh Hefner's Playboy".

== Books ==
General compilations

- Nick Stone, editor. The Bedside Playboy. Chicago: Playboy Press, 1963.

Anniversary collections

- Jacob Dodd, editor. The Playboy Book: Forty Years. Santa Monica, California: General Publishing Group, 1994, ISBN 1-881649-03-2
- Playboy: 50 Years, The Photographs. San Francisco: Chronicle Books, 2003, ISBN 0-8118-3978-8
- Nick Stone, editor; Michelle Urry, cartoon editor. Playboy: 50 Years, The Cartoons. San Francisco: Chronicle Books, 2004. ISBN 0-8118-3976-1
- Gretchen Edgren, editor. The Playboy Book: Fifty Years. Taschen, 1995. ISBN 3-8228-3976-0

Interview compilations

- G. Barry Golson, editor. The Playboy Interview. New York: Playboy Press, 1981. ISBN 0-87223-668-4 (hardcover), ISBN 0-87223-644-7 (softcover)
- G. Barry Golson, editor. The Playboy Interview Volume II. New York: Wideview/Perigee, 1983. ISBN 0-399-50768-X (hardcover), ISBN 0-399-50769-8 (softcover)
- David Sheff, interviewer; G. Barry Golson, editor. The Playboy Interviews with John Lennon and Yoko Ono. New York: Playboy Press, 1981, ISBN 0-87223-705-2; 2000 edition, ISBN 0-312-25464-4
- Stephen Randall, editor. The Playboy Interview Book: They Played the Game. New York: M Press, 2006, ISBN 1-59582-046-9

== See also ==
- Category:Playboy lists
- Counterculture of the 1960s
- List of men's magazines
- Playboy Bunny
- Playboy Club
- Playboy TV
- Playgirl
- Pubic Wars
- Media
  - Playboy's Book of Forbidden Words
  - Playboy Dolls
  - Playboy: The Mansion
