= Playboy Collectors' Figure Series =

Playboy Collectors' Figures are a series of dolls modeled after popular Playboy Playmates. Generally known as Playboy Dolls, the first doll was launched at the International Toy Fair in New York City in 2002. The dolls are 16 inches tall, dwarfing G.I. Joe dolls by 4 inches. Initial dolls in the series are:

- Victoria Silvstedt
- Karen McDougal
- Dalene Kurtis
- Ava Fabian
- Marilyn Monroe

The original concept was to release them as limited production run dolls for collectors every year after initial launch. The dolls boasted features such as soft plastic skin, joint articulation for realistic movement, and "anatomically correct" modelling. Wax casting of the face, hands, and certain other body parts was used to model those areas. Sculptors worked very closely with the Playmates throughout the process. For some of the latter dolls, computer scans of the Playmate's body was used. The proto-type painting schemes and colors for the skin and make-up for each doll was designed by Joe Petro a Los Angeles–based freelance artist.

The clothing for the dolls was usually modelled after the clothing used in the Playmate's pictorial or, in the case of Marilyn Monroe, a timeless classic costume associated with the subject. All dolls included a numbered certificate of their production run. A small number of these certificates were also signed by the artist Joe Petro.

The dolls are designed and manufactured by the Stronghold Group with assistance from Living Toyz and Evil Genius Toys.
