= Asheville–Buncombe Technical Community College =

Public college in Asheville, North Carolina, US

Coordinates: 35.5700°N 82.5541°W

- A-B Tech
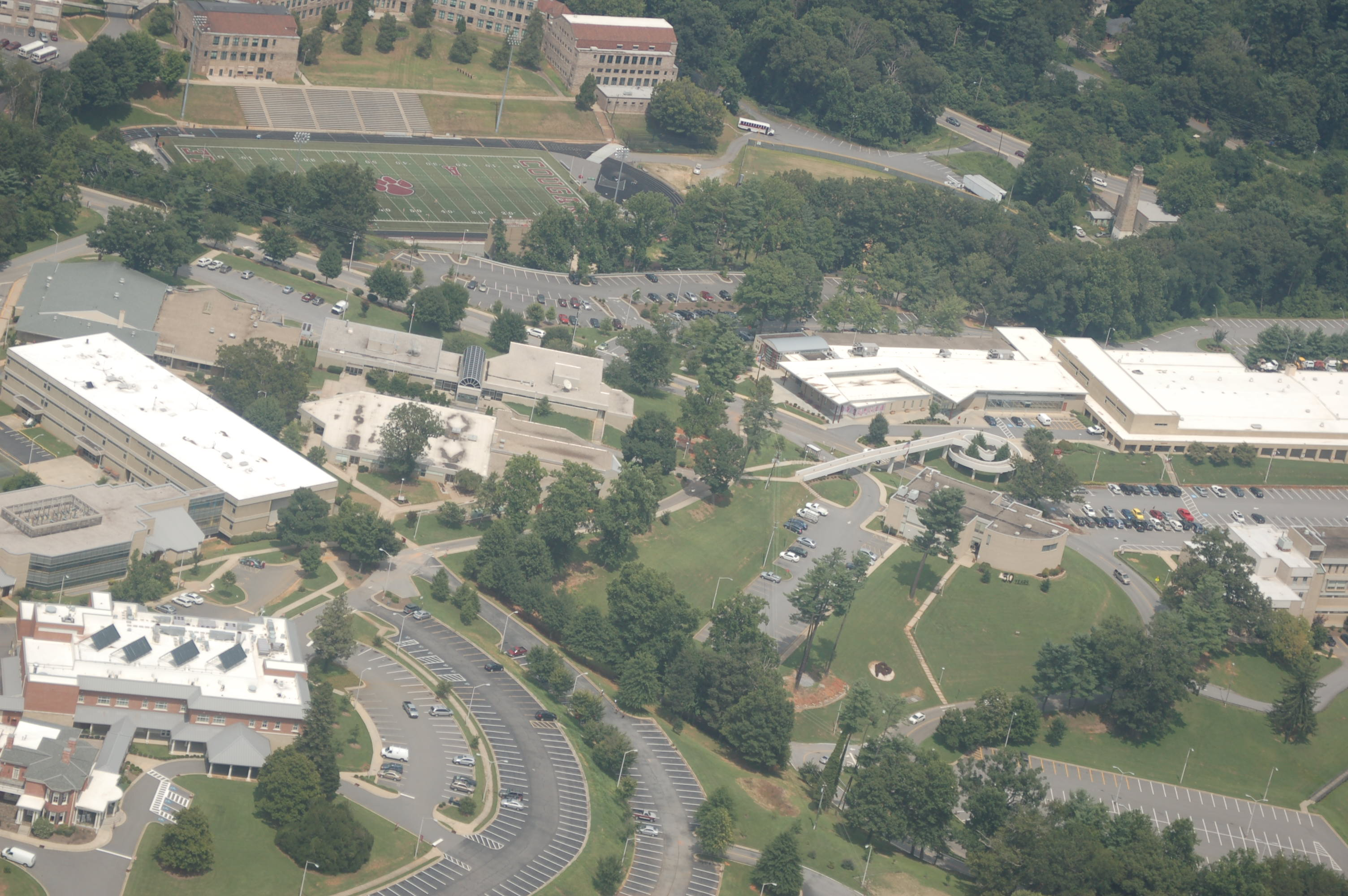
- A-B Tech Main Campus
- Type: Public community college
- Established: 1959; 67 years ago
- Parent institution: North Carolina Community College System
- President: John D. Gossett
- Administrative staff: 1,243
- Students: 21,654 (2019-20 academic year)
- Location: Asheville, North Carolina, United States
- Colors: Burgundy and gold
- Nickname: Trailblazers
- Mascot: Trailblazer (a black bear)
- Website: www.abtech.edu

Asheville–Buncombe Technical Community College (A-B Tech) is a public community college in Asheville, North Carolina. Established in 1959, the college is one of the oldest in the North Carolina Community College System and serves Buncombe and Madison counties across four different campuses, although students from anywhere may enroll. As of the 2014–15 school year, the curriculum enrollment was 10,070 and continuing education enrollment was 14,053 students. As of 2019–20, the college is the seventh largest in the North Carolina system and the largest in Western North Carolina. A-B Tech offers more than 120 degrees, diplomas, and certificates.

== Academics ==
The first program offered by the college was Practical Nursing. Electronics Engineering Technology and the Machinist programs were started in 1960. Today, A-B Tech offers the associate degrees in Arts, Science, Fine Arts, and Engineering, over 30 college transfer pathways, and a number of one to two semester diplomas and certificates. There are numerous programs that are tied in with each of these degrees.

As of 2015, approximately 23% of students at A-B Tech graduate with their associate degree, while others receive a certificate or diploma. Many attend for one or two years for general education credit before transferring to a four-year university to finish their course of study. A-B Tech has articulation agreements set up with every public 4-year university in the UNC system, and the school offers direct transfer programs in some of them. There are also opportunities available for juniors and seniors in high school to receive college credit before graduating that will transfer to a university, as well as an Early College program where high school students can receive a GED.

Accreditation programs recognizing A-B Tech include the Commission on Colleges of the Southern Association of Colleges and Schools, the North Carolina Board of Nursing, the National Accrediting Agency for Clinical Laboratory Sciences, the Joint Review Committee on Education Radiologic Technology, the American Dental Association, the Commission on Dental Accreditation, and the Accreditation Review Committee on Education in Surgical Technology.

A-B Tech is partnered with Mission Hospital to provide training for nursing students. In 2022, there were approximately 150 nursing students working at the hospital and four Mission staff members working at the college as adjunct professors. A-B Tech is also partnered with Goodwill to provide career coaching and basic job skills training through the Goodwill Workforce Training Center in West Asheville.

=== Campuses ===
A-B Tech consists of the following campuses:

- A-B Tech Asheville (340 Victoria Road, Asheville)
- A-B Tech Enka (1465 Sand Hill Road, Enka)
- A-B Tech Madison (4646 US 25-70, Marshall)
- A-B Tech Woodfin (24 Canoe Lane, Woodfin)

A-B Tech has a unit of the NC Community College's Small Business Center Network located on its Enka campus grounds which helps support new entrepreneurs and small business owners. In December 2024, A-B Tech Enka's Small Business Center partnered with the U.S. SBA to set up a Business Recovery Center to support small businesses affected by Hurricane Helene.

== Historic buildings ==
The main A-B Tech campus in Asheville is located on the former estate of Col. John Kerr, a veteran (Confederate) of the American Civil War. The 144-acre campus has historic buildings, including Ivy Hall, Fernihurst, the Smith-McDowell House and Sunnicrest.

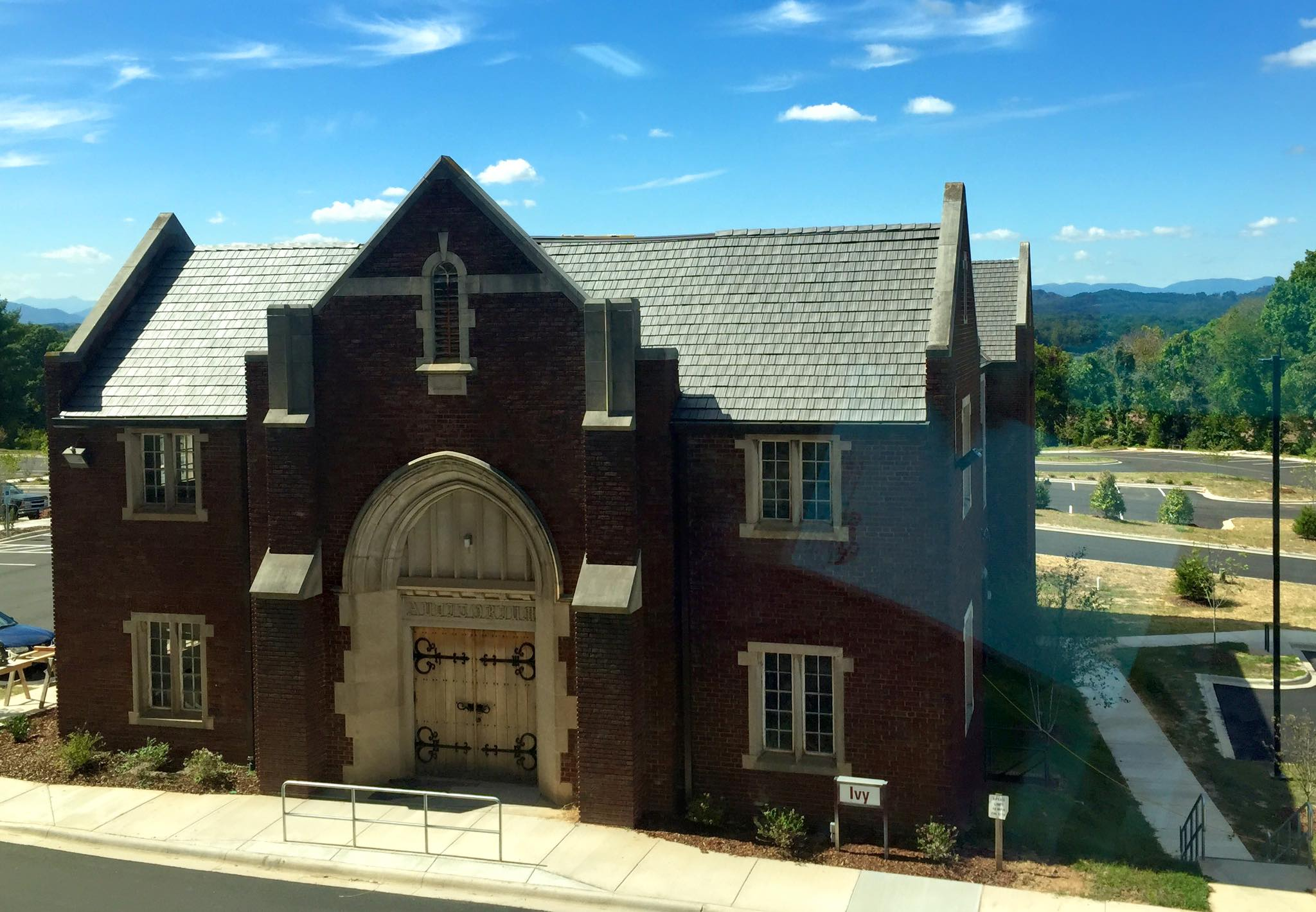
Ivy Hall

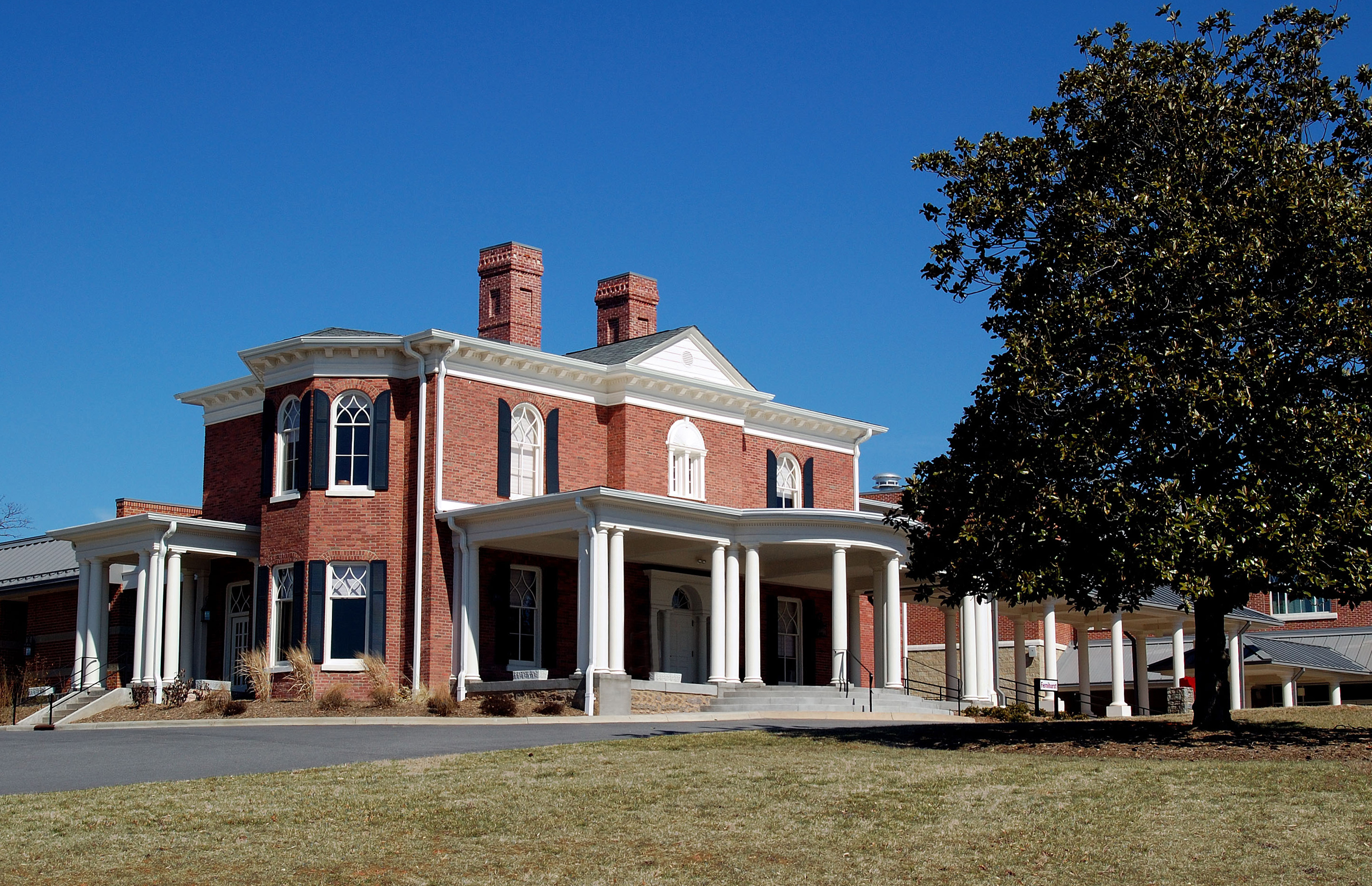
Fernihurst

Fernihurst, the former summer residence of Col. John Kerr, is a brick Italianate style house named after the Kerr family castle in Scotland. Located on a hill, south of the Smith-McDowell house, Fernihurst is part of A-B Tech Community College Culinary Arts Program.

The Smith-McDowell House, on the A-B Tech campus, was constructed in 1840 for James McConnell Smith. The house is the oldest brick building in Buncombe County and is currently a nonprofit museum that is included in the National Register of Historic Places.

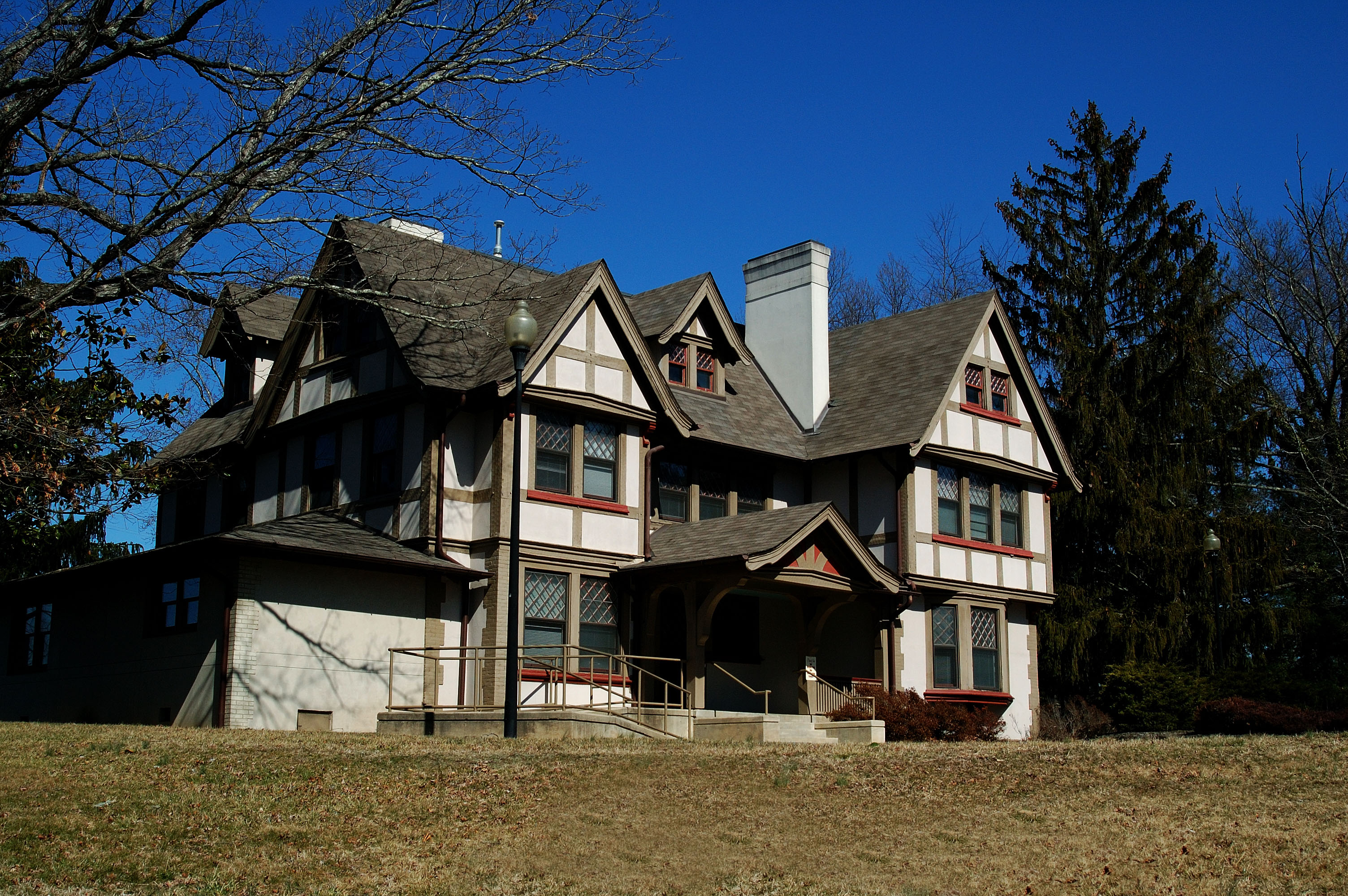
Sunnicrest

Sunnicrest is one of five (and the only remaining) R.S. Smith-designed model cottages built by George Vanderbilt on Vernon Hill in what was then the town of Victoria. Sunnicrest houses the Human Resources Department of the A-B Tech Community College.

St. Genevieve-of-the-Pines, a Religious of Christian Education school, opened in 1908 and moved to the three-story 80-room former Victoria Inn in 1910, its third location. The school merged with Asheville Country Day School in 1987, creating Carolina Day School. A-B Tech bought the St. Genevieve campus while the new school at Asheville Country Day's campus. The only remaining building from St. Genevieve-of-the-Pines is Ivy Hall, an auditorium, gymnasium, and cafeteria built in 1936. A-B Tech announced plans in 2016 to renovate the structure for use as a public event space and College Advancement offices.

== Notable alumni ==
- Philip DeFranco — news commentator and YouTube personality
- Evan Golden — professional wrestler
- Silver Iocovozzi — chef
