= Silver Iocovozzi =

American chef and restauranteur

- Born: Parris Island, South Carolina, US
- Education: Asheville-Buncombe Technical Community College
- Culinary career
- Current restaurant: Neng Jr's
- Awards won: Nomination: James Beard Award for Best Chef (Southeast) (2025); Food and Wine Best New Chef (2024); Cultured Cult 100 (2024); New York Times 50 Best Restaurants (2023); Time 100 Next (2023); Them Now (Food) (2023); Esquire Rising Star (2022); Nomination: James Beard Award for Best New Restaurant (2023)

Silver Leon Iocovozzi (né Silver Leon Cousler) is an American chef and restaurateur most known for his Filipinx (Note: Iocovozzi is transmasc, uses he/him pronouns and identifies as filipinx)-Southern restaurant Neng Jr's, which, when it was founded in 2022, was the first Filipinx restaurant in Asheville. Since then, he was nominated for two James Beard Awards: Best New Restaurant in 2023 and Best Chef (Southeast) in 2025. He was awarded Them's Now (Food) award in 2023, and that same year was made one of the Time 100 Next honorees. In 2024, he was named one of Food and Wine's Best New Chefs. He has been regarded by Them as one of the leaders of the new wave of queer food culture.

== Biography ==
Iocovozzi was born in Parris Island, a military base in South Carolina, to a father who served in the US Marines and a Filipino immigrant mother. He grew up in Apex, North Carolina, then a rural town, and was inspired by watching his mother learn to cook meals from home.

He enrolled in Asheville–Buncombe Technical Community College to study drafting in an effort to become an architect, but after working a part-time job at a small Japanese restaurant, he realized he wanted to become a chef and switched paths to the culinary program, which focused on French cooking.

He later went on to cook at Mission Chinese Food in New York, serve as Chef in Residence at the Palm Heights hotel in the Grand Caymans, and work as Sous Chef at Buxton Hill Barbecue in Asheville.

He married his partner, Cherry Iocovozzi, a fellow transmasculine restaurateur, in 2022. Less than a month later, they opened Neng Jr's, a Filipinx-Southern restaurant, together. He has discussed how his identity as a Filipinx trans person in the South informs his cuisine at Neng Jr's.

The restaurant shuttered for 10 weeks after Hurricane Helene. During that time Iocovozzi ran pop-ups in New York and provided meals to those in need in Asheville.

He was named a 2022 Rising Star by Esquire. He was named as a Time 100 Next honoree in 2023: his profile was written by Angela Dimayuga. Neng Jr's was nominated for the James Beard Award for Best New Restaurant in 2023 and he was nominated for Best Chef (Southeast) in 2025. He was named Them's 2023 honoree in the Food category. He was named to the Cult 100 in 2024, and that same year was named a Food and Wine Best New Chef. He appeared in an episode of Top Chef.
