= Smith-McDowell House =

Historic house in Asheville, North Carolina

- U.S. National Register of Historic Places
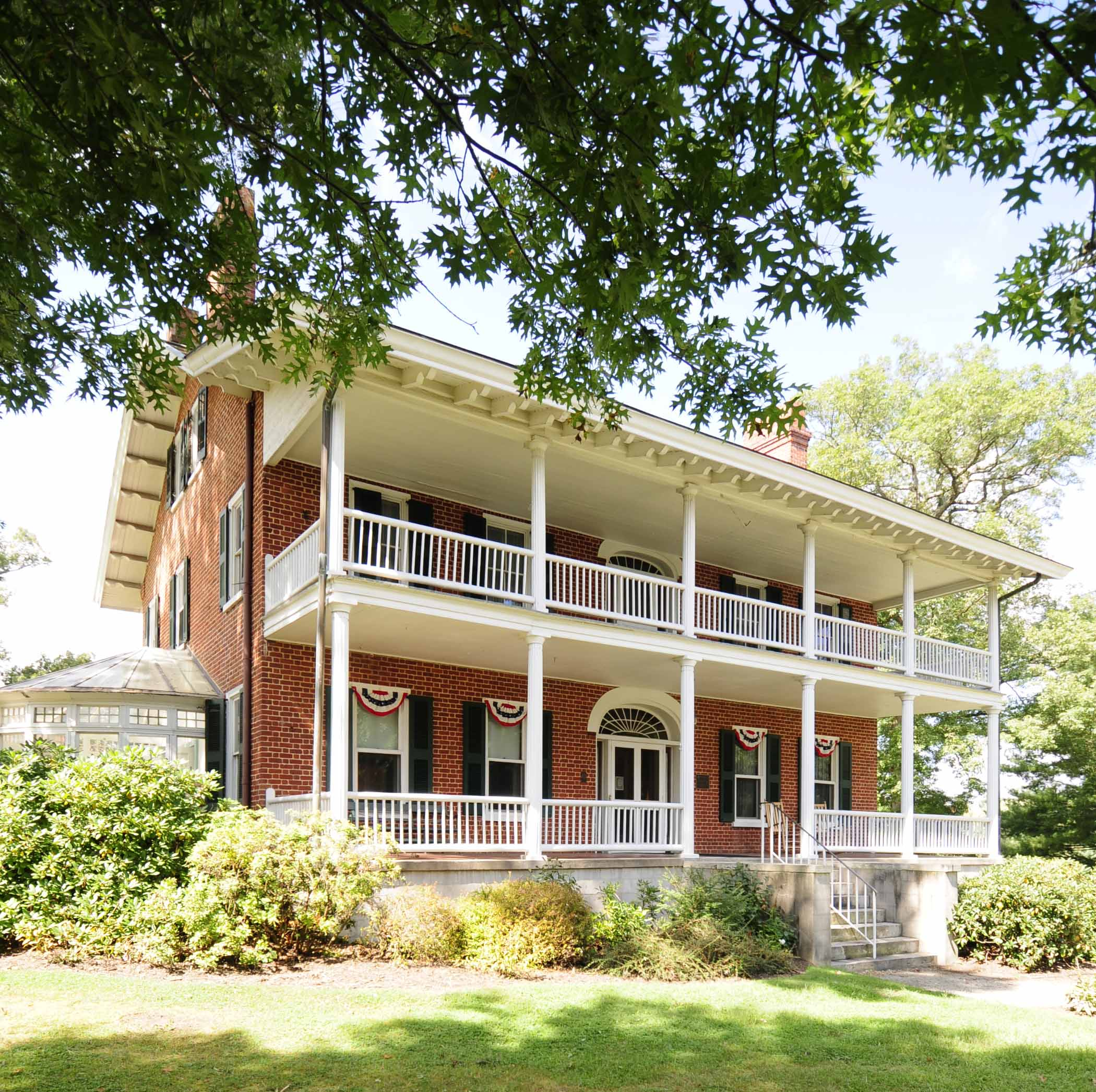
- Smith-McDowell House

- Location within North Carolina Location within the United States
- Location: 283 Victoria Road, Asheville, North Carolina, US
- Coordinates: 35°34′23″N 82°33′18″W
- Built: c. 1840
- Architectural style: Greek Revival
- NRHP reference No.: 75001243
- Added to NRHP: August 1, 1975

The Smith-McDowell House is a c. 1840 brick mansion located in Asheville, North Carolina. It is one of the "finest antebellum buildings in Western North Carolina." Listed on the National Register of Historic Places, it was the first mansion built in Asheville and is the oldest surviving brick structure in Buncombe County. Since October, 2023, the building is home to Asheville Museum of History.

== History ==
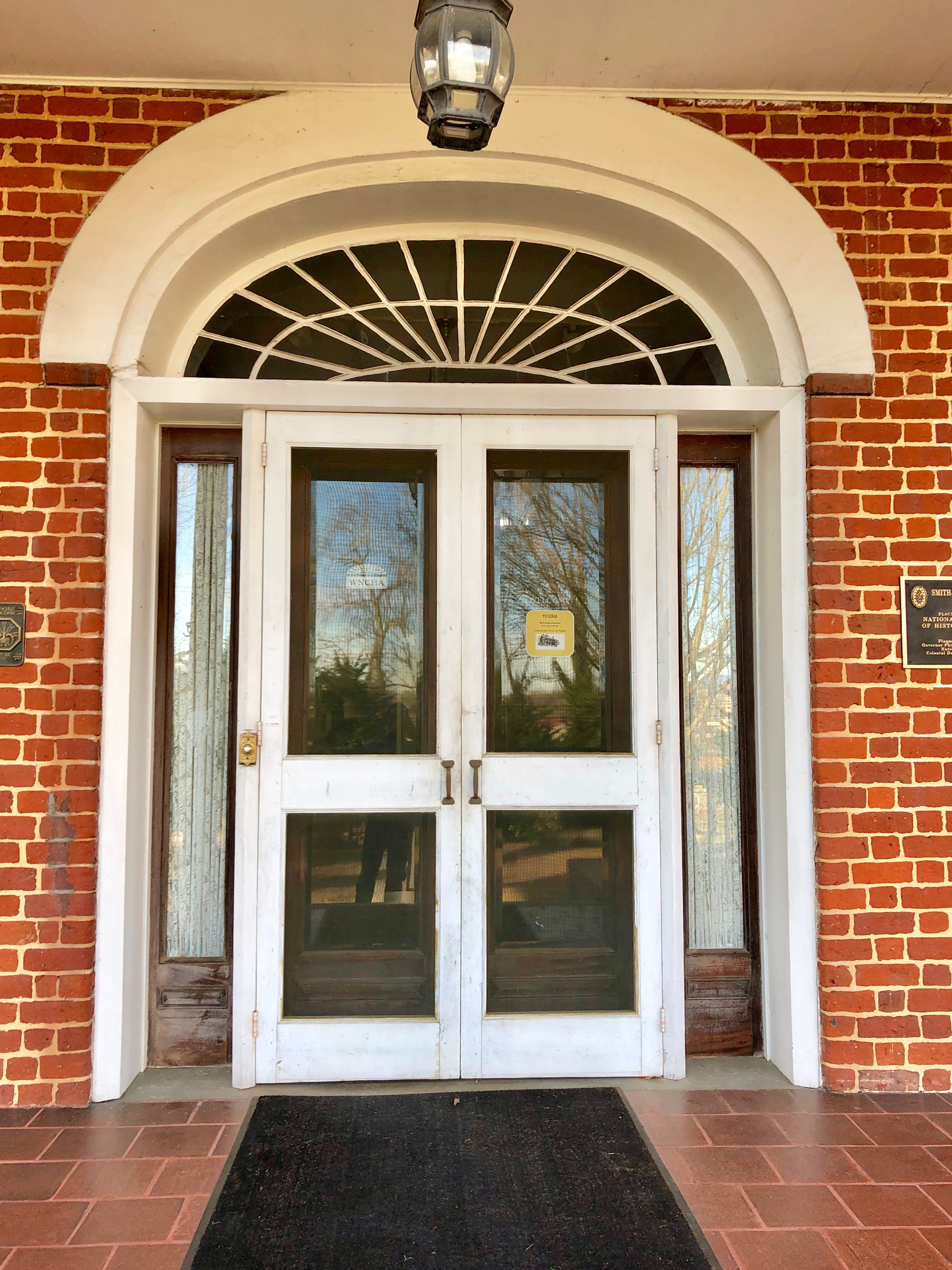
Entrance with fanlight

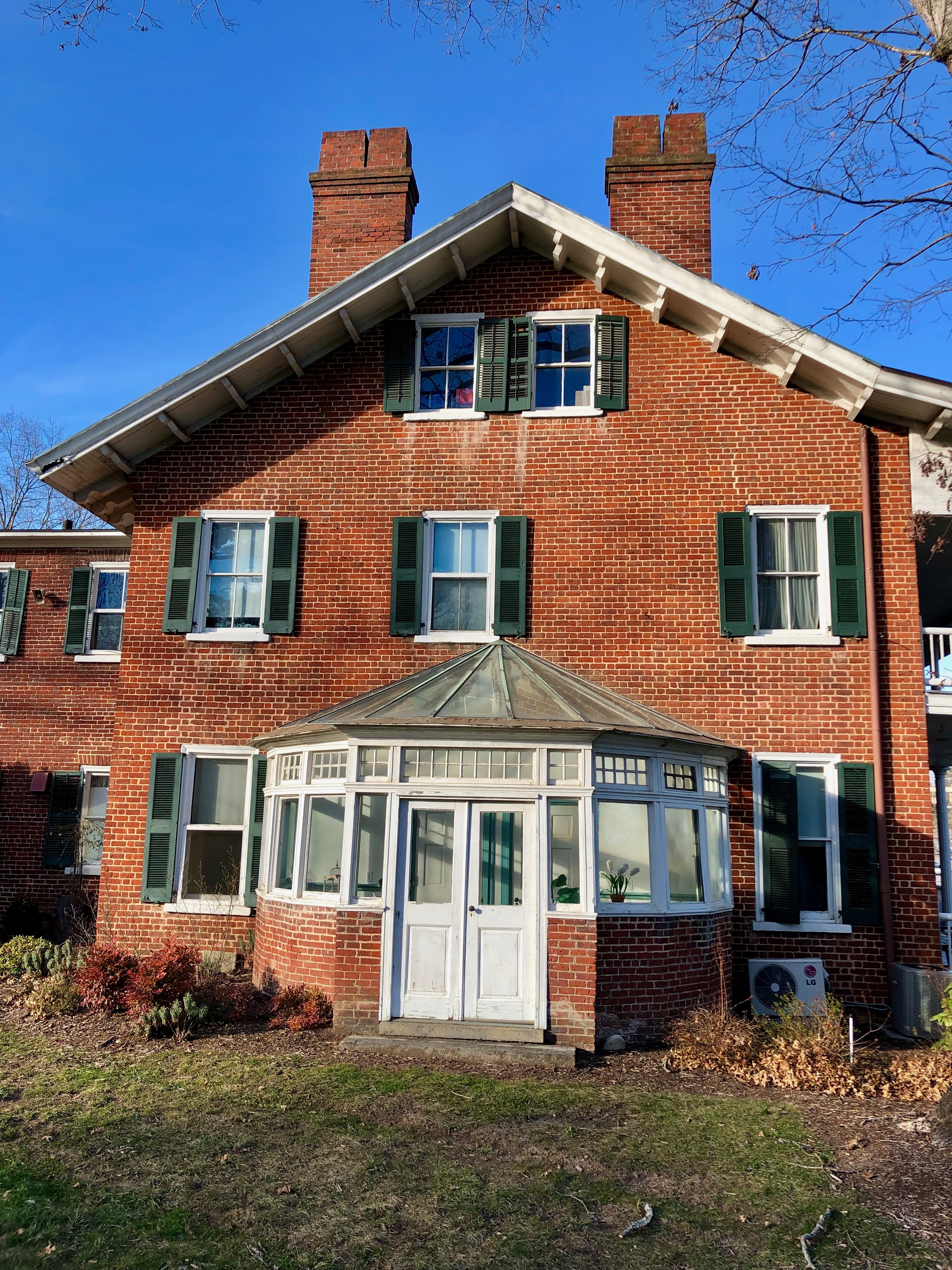
Side view with solarium

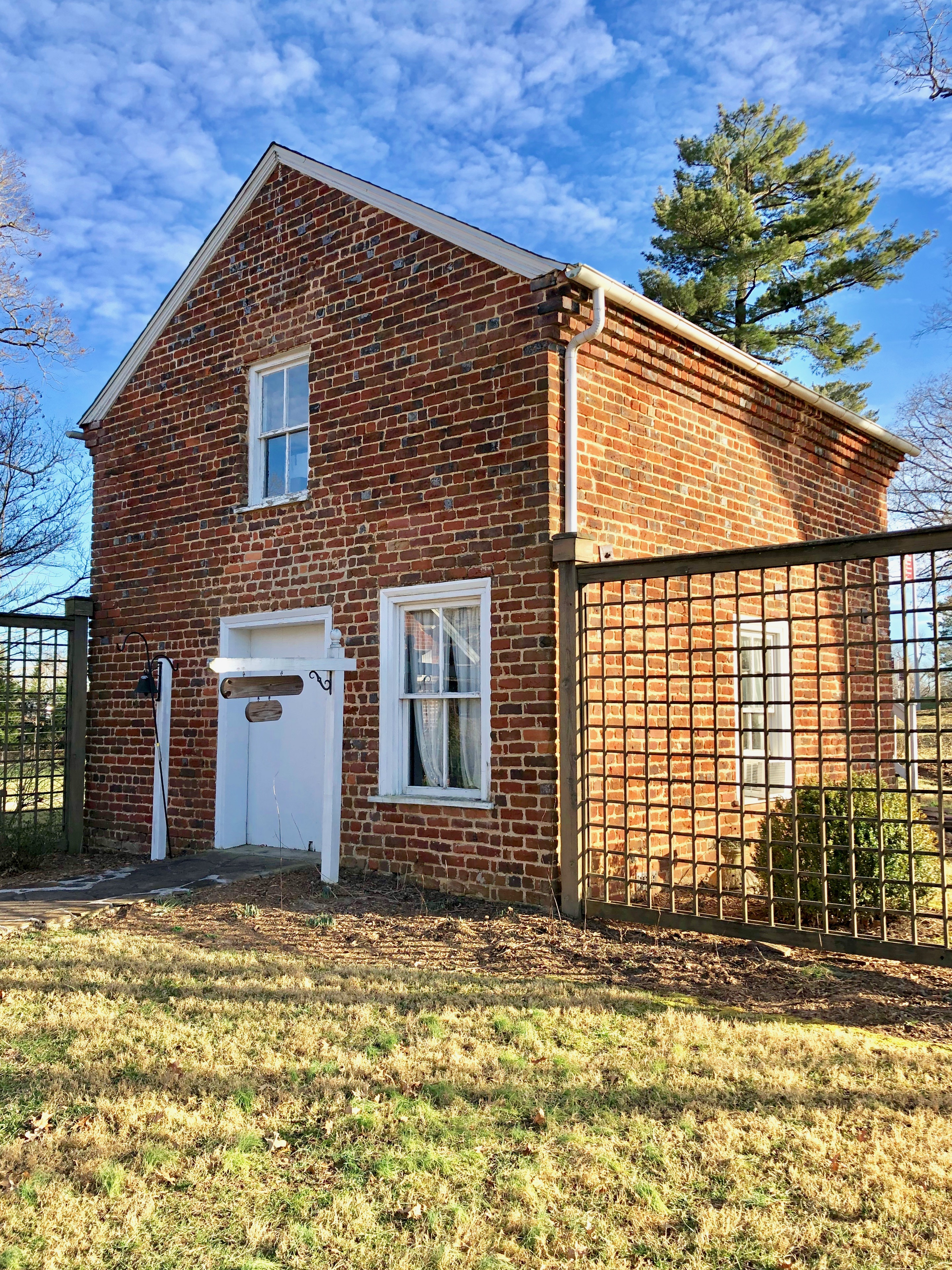
Smokehouse

=== 19th century ===
The house was constructed c. 1840 for James McConnell Smith on a portion of the land owned by his father, Colonel Daniel Smith, a Revolutionary War veteran. Daniel Smith originally purchased the 300 acres of land at the confluence of the French Broad and Swannanoa rivers in 1796 from another veteran, William Steward, for $100. James Smith was the second mayor of Asheville and one of the wealthiest landowners and businessmen in the region. He was also one of Buncombe County's largest enslavers, holding at least 70 people captive around the time this house was constructed. It is likely that enslaved people built the house and provided labor for most of his money-making endeavors. His businesses included a toll bridge across the French Broad River, the Buck Hotel, a tannery, a gristmill, a sawmill, and a mercantile. Smith's choice of brick for his farmhouse was a show of wealth as this building material was atypical for antebellum western North Carolina.

After Smith died in 1856, the estate and 13 people he enslaved were passed to his son, John Patton Smith. John died in 1859 without a will and the house and several of those enslaved were auctioned as part of his estate. His sister, Sarah Lucinda, and her husband, Confederate Major William Wallace McDowell, bought the house and 350 acres (140 ha) for $10,000. The McDowells raised eight children in their home and added more enslaved people, eventually numbering approximately 40. The McDowells lived there until 1880 when post-Civil War financial difficulties forced them to sell.

In 1881, Alexander Garrett purchased and modernized the house, including connecting the summer kitchen to the main house and adding a solarium, Italianate windows, and a metal roof to replace the original wood shingles. Garret built the Oakland Inn down the road from his house and became the mayor of Victoria, a small community built on former Smith-McDowell plantation property. Garret died in 1897, leaving the house to his son, Robert, who sold the house and 6 acres (2.4 ha) to Dr. Charles Van Bergen for $10,000.

=== 20th century ===
Van Bergen hired Frederick Law Olmsted Jr., the son of the then-deceased Frederick Law Olmsted, to design a landscape plan for the property. Socialite Caroline Bates McKee purchased the house in 1909, followed by Brewster Chapman in 1913. Chapman hired architect Richard Sharp Smith, previously supervising architect for the construction of Biltmore, to redesign the interior of the main level. Changes included adding a side entrance, bathrooms, new mantles on the main level, mahogany doors, and oak flooring throughout. Exterior changes included adding decorative caps to the chimneys and the addition of a red slate roof.

In 1951, Smith–McDowell House was converted into classrooms (main level) and a dormitory (upper two levels) for a private high school. Years of neglect, followed by the school's closing, had ravaged the structure that was part of land acquisition by Asheville-Buncombe Technical Community College in 1961. In 1974, the Western North Carolina Historical Association (WNCHA) leased the house from the community college and began its restoration. Under the supervision of architect Henry Gaines, the restoration took six years.

Smith-McDowell House was listed on the National Register of Historic Places in 1975. The association opened Smith-McDowell House Museum on May 31, 1981. The museum was organized as a timeline house museum, showing how families lived during the late 19th and early 20th-centuries. It also featured changing exhibits relating to the history of Western North Carolina.

=== 21st Century ===
In 2020, WNCHA purchased the house and the small parcel of surrounding land from the community college and began work on a new interpretive plan and interior restorations closer to the mansion's 1840s appearance. The walls were painted white and the baseboards a dark brown. In October 2023, the house reopened as the Asheville Museum of History with all new permanent exhibits.

== Architecture ==
The three-story Smith-McDowell House is a blend of architectural styles dating from its original 1840 construction and the additions completed in the late 19th and early 20th centuries. The original architect and builder of the house are unknown, although family tradition says the plans were brought from England. Also, the surviving original interior woodwork is similar to that made by Ephraim Clayton who was active in the area at the time.

The floor plan is typical of Federal style. It is a double-pile plan, Flemish bond, five-bay mansion that features a double-tier porch that is semi-engaged beneath an extension of its gable roof. Each three-bay end wall has a pair of chimneys. The brick walls are 12 to 20 inches (30 to 51 cm) thick, with the interior plaster applied directly.

The original Federal character that dominated the house's exterior remains in the large fanlight above the front doors and in the delicacy of the front porch that is supported by twelve slender fluted columns (six on each level). The house has corbelled cornices that feature dentils. The exterior of the building at one time displayed penciling, and remnants remain in several spots.

Although much of the dwelling's original Greek Revival interior woodwork was replaced during a Neoclassical style remodeling in 1913, the second floor's mantels, window frames, and door frames are original, dating from the 1840s. A one-story semicircular solarium was added to the southern end wall in the late 1880s.

There are two remaining brick outbuildings from the plantation era, both located near the rear of the house: the summer kitchen, which is now attached to the main house, and a dependency formerly used for salt curing and as laundry.

== Asheville Museum of History. ==
Today, Smith-McDowell House is owned and operated by the Western North Carolina Historical Association as the nonprofit Asheville Museum of History. The museum explores the history of the 23-county western North Carolina region through permanent and changing exhibits, educational programming, and special events. The permanent exhibit also covers the history of the land, the first inhabitants, the house, and the free and enslaved people who have lived there.
