= EHealthInsurance =

Private online marketplace for health insurance

eHealth, Inc.
- Formerly: eHealthInsurance
- Company type: Public
- Traded as: Nasdaq: EHTH
- Industry: Insurance agency
- Founded: 1997; 29 years ago
- Headquarters: Indianapolis, Indiana
- Key people: Derrick Duke (CEO); John Dolan (CFO)
- Products: Health Insurance
- Revenue: ▲$554 million (2025)
- Net income: ▲$40 million (2025)
- Total assets: ▲$77.2 million (2025)
- Number of employees: 1,475 (2025)
- Website: ehealthinsurance.com www.medicare.com gomedigap.com planprescriber.com ehealthmedicare.com

eHealth, or eHealthInsurance Services, Inc., is a publicly traded online marketplace (through holding company eHealth, Inc.) that specializes in health insurance serving as a licensed health insurance agency and advisor. The company helps people compare health insurance plans from over 180 insurance carriers, including Medicare coverage options such as Medicare Advantage, Medigap, and prescription drug plans.

eHealth also sells individual plans, competing with health insurance marketplaces, and assists employers with the administration of Individual Coverage Health Reimbursement Arrangements (ICHRA). The company sells plans in all 50 U.S. states and the District of Columbia with its staff of licensed insurance agents assisting consumers with enrollment online or by phone.

The company has a largely remote workforce with headquarters in Indianapolis, Indiana, and satellite offices in Fremont, California and Salt Lake City, Utah.

== History ==
eHealth, Inc. was founded in 1997. The founder, Vip Patel, started the company in Silicon Valley after a personal experience getting food poisoning and lacking health insurance.

In 2006, the company became a public company via an initial public offering. The company opened at the NASDAQ exchange with $14 a share.

In 2010, eHealth acquired PlanPrescriber, Inc. for $28.7 million in cash. PlanPrescriber provides tools to help people choose the right Medicare plan.

In 2013, eHealth, along with other "web brokers", signed deals with Healthcare.gov to enroll subsidy-eligible consumers in the newly approved health plans offered through the Patient Protection and Affordable Care Act.

In 2014, eHealth acquired the Medicare.com domain name for $4.8 million.

In May 2016, the company appointed Scott Flanders, a director of the company since 2008, as CEO. Former CEO Gary Lauer continued in an advisory role through the end of 2016.

In August 2016, eHealth announced that it had insured 5 million people..

In 2018, eHealth acquired GoMedigap, a consumer acquisition and engagement electronic platform tailored to Medigap insurance.

In 2019 eHealth announced the development of an Eastern Headquarters in Indianapolis, Indiana.

In 2020, eHealth announced its follow-on public offering of 1,800,000 shares, priced at $115/share, of its common stock, designed to raise an additional $207M. Three days later they announced the closing of the offering, with the 275,000 share option also having been exercised, raising a net proceeds of approximately $227.5 million after deducting underwriting discounts and commissions and the estimated expenses of the offering.

In 2021, eHealth appointed Fran Soistman as CEO. Former CEO Scott Flanders continued in an advisory role through the end of 2021.

In August 2022, eHealth announced that it had begun offering Individual Coverage Health Reimbursement Arrangement (ICHRA) products and services to employer customers as part of its employer-facing benefits platform. The company stated that the offering allowed employers to provide defined contributions toward employees’ individual health insurance purchases rather than traditional group coverage.

In November 2022, eHealth marked its 25th anniversary since its founding in 1997 as an online health insurance marketplace. The company reported that it had connected millions of consumers with individual, family, and Medicare insurance plans through its platform over that period.

In 2023, eHealth introduced a refreshed brand identity and a new consumer-facing spokesperson named “Eve” as part of its marketing strategy for its Medicare and individual insurance platforms. The rebranding was presented as part of efforts to simplify consumer engagement with its insurance comparison tools.

In January 2025, eHealth launched “Iris,” an employer-focused platform designed to support administration of ICHRA-based health benefits. The system was positioned as an end-to-end tool for employers to manage contributions and employee plan selection in the individual insurance market. In April 2025, the company introduced an artificial intelligence–based voice assistant named “Alice” to support customer service interactions and insurance enrollment assistance.

In July 2025, eHealth announced the appointment of Derrick Duke as chief executive officer, succeeding Fran Soistman, who retired from the role. The leadership transition was reported in financial press coverage of the company’s restructuring and strategic focus on Medicare and employer health benefits.

In February 2026, eHealth stated that it was shifting its customer service model to what it described as “lifelong guidance” and continuous support for consumers beyond initial enrollment periods. The company indicated that this approach was intended to emphasize ongoing plan optimization and assistance rather than one-time insurance enrollment transactions.

== Reception ==
For people eligible for Medicare, eHealth can sort plan options by cost and coverage, with some users saving over $1,600 per year by switching Medicare Advantage plans.

For employers, eHealth helps administer ICHRA and enables companies in some states to save on healthcare costs compared to traditional group plans.

=== Healthcare reform ===
In 2013, eHealth's former CEO, Gary Lauer encouraged governors that are planning to create their own online healthcare marketplaces to adopt a cost-free enrollment strategy.

In 2015, eHealth's former CEO, Gary Lauer advocated reforms to help the middle-class afford health insurance.

In 2017, eHealth CEO Scott Flanders argued publicly for changes to the Affordable Care Act in order to lower costs for self-employed, middle-class workers who cannot afford health insurance.

In 2021, eHealth expressed support for policy actions by the Biden administration to expand enhanced premium subsidies under the Affordable Care Act and to reopen enrollment periods during the COVID-19 pandemic. Reporting at the time noted broad industry support from health insurance marketplaces for subsidy expansion under the American Rescue Plan Act.

In 2021, eHealth announced the formation of a Public Policy Advisory Committee intended to provide strategic input on healthcare policy engagement. The committee included former Kentucky governor Steve Beshear, former Louisiana governor Bobby Jindal, former U.S. Surgeon General Jerome Adams, former California policy adviser Susan Kennedy (former chief of staff to Governor Arnold Schwarzenegger), and physician and public health official Woodrow “Woody” Myers.

In 2023, eHealth added Alfred_W. Redmer Jr., former Maryland Insurance Commissioner, to its Public Policy Advisory Committee, as part of ongoing updates to the advisory group’s membership.

In 2024, chief executive officer Fran Soistman publicly supported expanding the Medicare Annual Enrollment Period, consistent with broader industry discussions around Medicare Advantage enrollment timing and beneficiary choice. In the same year, eHealth added former U.S. Representative Jaime Herrera Beutler to its Public Policy Advisory Committee.

In 2026, chief executive officer Derrick Duke urged the Centers for Medicare & Medicaid Services to expand the use of artificial intelligence tools to assist Medicare beneficiaries in selecting and enrolling in coverage. Reporting on Medicare modernization efforts has noted increasing interest among private-sector stakeholders in AI-assisted enrollment tools for federal health insurance programs.
