= Men's Fitness =

Men's magazine published by American Media, Inc

- Robert Downey Jr. on the cover of Men's Fitness (U.S.), Jan/Feb 2012.
- Categories: Fitness, nutrition, sports, outdoors, careers
- Frequency: 10 issues per year
- Total circulation: 599,492 (2013)
- Founded: 1987
- Final issue: 2017
- Company: The Arena Group
- Country: United States
- Website: mensfitness.com
- ISSN: 0893-4460

Men's Fitness was a men's magazine published by American Media, Inc and founded in the United States in 1987. The premier issue featured Michael Pare from the television series The Greatest American Hero.

The magazine's slogan was "How the Best Man Wins". The magazine targeted men ages 21–40 years and featured in-depth articles on fitness, nutrition, and sports, as well as sex tips, fashion advice, interviews, recipes, and surveys.

Since its inception, Men’s Fitness became one of the fastest-growing titles in its category and licenses its title and format to Russian, Australian (readership of 119th. as of June 2018) and British editions. Circulation doubled between 1997 and 2003. As of February 2007, circulation was 700,000. As of 2009, the British edition is no longer published under license from AMI. Dennis Publishing acquired control of the complete publishing rights for Men’s Fitness in the UK and Ireland in 2009.

In late 2017, the print version of Men's Fitness was folded into Men's Journal.

In December 2021, The Arena Group acquired the digital assets of Men's Journal, including Men's Fitness, from a360 Media.

In December 2024, The Arena Group relaunched Men's Fitness and mensfitness.com.

== Covers ==
People who appeared on its cover include Pamela Anderson, Arnold Schwarzenegger, Mark Wahlberg, Liam Hemsworth, Andy Roddick, Joe Weider, Robert Marting, Dana White, Sebastian Siegel, Reggie Bush, Albert Pujols, Karen McDougal, Mike 'The Situation' Sorrentino, Carmen Electra, Tim Tebow, Tom Brady, and John Cena.

Tennis champion Andy Roddick complained when he discovered his body had been altered in the May 2007, cover photo of the magazine. He wrote on his blog, "If you can manage to stop laughing at the cover long enough, check out the article inside." "Little did I know I have 22-inch guns and a disappearing birthmark on my right arm." Representatives of the magazine asserted that the athlete's arms had been enhanced, not replaced.

== Controversy ==
In October 2011, Men's Fitness gained negative publicity across the internet after publishing an article written by Jordan Burchette. In the article, candid and unflattering photos of costumed attendees at New York Comic Con were shown alongside seemingly mean-spirited captions. The jokes commented on the attendee's weight and physical stature.

Web sites frequented by comic book and cosplay enthusiasts, such as iFanboy.com posted their own thoughts on the situation. In his column for iFanboy, Josh Flanagan pointed out the poor techniques used in the reporting of Burchette's piece, and commented on the lackluster response of Men's Fitness as well as Burchette, citing them as defending the article as a work of comedy.

In response to the controversy, Men's Fitness removed the offending article on October 24, 2011. A similar derogatory article by Burchette written for Maxim appears on his website.

As of December 6, 2011, the Men's Fitness article is available online again.
