= Scott Flanders =

American businessperson (born 1956)

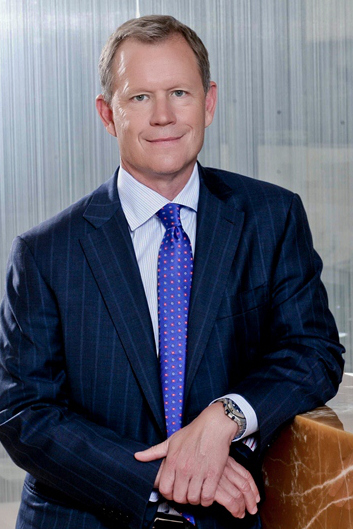
- Born: December 26, 1956 (age 69); Indianapolis, Indiana, U.S.
- Education: University of Colorado, Indiana University and Maurer School of Law
- Occupations: CEO, eHealthInsurance

Scott N. Flanders (born-December 26, 1956) is an American corporate executive in the media, entertainment and technology industries. He has been chief executive officer of eHealth, Inc, since May 2016. He formerly was CEO of Playboy Enterprises, and held CEO positions at Macmillan Inc., Telstreet, Freedom Communications, and Columbia House.

== Education ==
Flanders was born on December 26, 1956, in Indianapolis, Indiana, US. He attended the University of Colorado, where he earned a Bachelor of Arts in economics. He later received a Juris Doctor from Maurer School of Law at Indiana University. He is also a C.P.A.

== Business career ==
=== Macmillan ===
From 1986 to 1998, Flanders was the president of Macmillan Publishers. He joined Macmillan from Que Corp., where he oversaw the sale of the computer book publisher to Macmillan in 1986. In his subsequent 14 years at Macmillan, he established the firm as the world's largest computer book publisher and the first publisher of books about the Internet. The company's revenues increased from $5 million to $500 million under his leadership. The Macmillan name was acquired by Pearson in 1998.

=== Telstreet ===
Between 1998 and 1999, he was co-founder, chairman and chief executive of Telstreet.com, an Indianapolis-based e-commerce company that merged with Buy.com in 2000.

=== Columbia House Company ===
In 1999, Flanders was hired by Sony and Time Warner Inc. to lead the integration of CDNow, an online music retailer, and Columbia House to establish a new public company jointly held by the two CDNow shareholders The merger plans, made public in the fall of 1999, were dissolved in March 2000, with many analysts pointed to the bursting of the dot-com bubble as a factor.

After the dissolution of the merger, Flanders transitioned to the role of Chairman and CEO of Columbia House Company, where he led the company's turnaround strategy, making several executive changes and transitioning the company from a print customer acquisition model to one dominated by online.

Flanders also led a leveraged buyout of Columbia House by the Blackstone Group. Columbia House was later sold to Bertelsmann in a transaction that closed in July 2005.

=== Freedom Communications ===
His prior work with the Columbia House led Blackstone Group to ask Flanders to join Freedom Communications as the president and chief executive officer, where he spent 2006 to 2009. He also was on Freedom Communications' board of directors during this time and as an independent director for five years before joining the company as its president and CEO. During his board tenure, Freedom recapitalized with two private equity firms, the Blackstone Group and Providence Equity Partners.

=== Playboy Enterprises ===
Flanders was president of the firm during the transformation of Playboy into a brand management company. In March 2011, with financing from private equity firm Rizvi Traverse Management and investment bank Jefferies & Company, Playboy Enterprises went private for $6.15 per share. In the 20-month period between his arrival and the go-private transaction, shareholder earnings increased 2.07 times the stock price at the time of his arrival.

=== eHealth, Inc. ===
Flanders took over as CEO of eHealth, Inc. after being a member of eHealth's board for eight years. Upon taking the reins at eHealth, Flanders developed a three-point plan to drive substantial growth that was announced to shareholders in October 2016.

== Other ==
- President of the board of visitors of the Maurer School of Law at Indiana University.
- Member of the board of eHealth, Inc.
- One of the angel investors in Ooyala in the company's first round of funding.
- Board member of the Newspaper Association of America from 2006-2007.
- Board of trustees of the Orange County Museum of Art in Newport Beach, California.
