= David Mecey =

David Mecey is an American photographer best known for his work with the magazine Playboy.

== Early years ==
Mecey credits a motorcycle accident with the start of his photographic career, when his attending doctor suggested pursuing the hobby after seeing some of Mecey's artwork.

== Playboy ==
Mecey joined Playboy Magazine in 1980 as a staff photographer. During his 24-year career with the magazine, he would become synonymous with, and best known for, his work on the "Girls of..." collegiate series along with fellow photographer David Chan. Mecey's first credit on the series would be September 1980's "Girls of the Southwest Conference".

"Girls of..." was an annual pictorial from 1977 until 2015, typically being published in the September or October issue of the magazine. It briefly became biannual, adding an additional feature in the April issue between 1989 and 1992. The content of the pictorial featured nude or partially nude images of students at universities in various collegiate athletic conferences.

Aside from the collegiate "Girls of..." series, Mecey would publish several solo pictorials, such as "Girls of Texas" (February 1985) and "Women of Wall Street" (August 1989). Mecey is also informally credited with "discovering 24 Playmates of the Month". He also served as co-host and primary photographer for Playboy TV's Sexy Girls Next Door between 2000-03.

Mecey would part ways with Playboy in 2002 after 23 years. He served as a contributing photographer with the magazine from 1987 until his departure.

== Other work ==
Mecey's work was not limited to Playboy. He shot four covers of the SPORT swimsuit issue in the mid-90s and contributed to numerous other glamour magazine covers. His work also appeared in the French and German regional publications of GQ, as well as MenSTYLE-France. Mecey was also a guest speaker at Photokina in 2008 and 2010.

Mecey has done work for numerous celebrities including: Michael Keaton, Peter Horton, Robert Palmer, Ray Liotta, Sparky Anderson, Brooke Shields, Lynda Carter, Rachel Hunter, Carmen Electra, and Sharon Stone.

In 2001, Mecey founded the "FotoFantasyCamp", an immersive on-location photography workshop. Today he continues doing workshops titled David Mecey's Photo Workshop Experience.

In 2022, David launched his own men's lifestyle magazine, MECÉ, loosely based on the look and stylings of classic Playboy during the years he worked there. It can be found at https://mecemagazine.com

== Personal life ==
Mecey is a car enthusiast and served as the Chief Driving Instructor for the Los Angeles Chapter of the BMW Car Club of America between 1996 and 2012. He has also participated in a number of endurance races.

According to his personal website, Mecey continues to live and work out of Las Vegas since 2016.
