= Phillip Picardi =

American journalist and editor (born 1991)

- Born: April 5, 1991 (age 35)
- Education: Harvard Divinity School
- Alma mater: New York University
- Occupation: Editor
- Years active: 2010-present
- Era: 21st century
- Employer: Playboy
- Organization: Pride Media Inc.
- Website: twitter.com/pfpicardi

Phillip Picardi (born April 5, 1991) is an American journalist and editor. He is the founding editor of Them and formerly editor-in-chief of Out, in 2026 he was appointed editor-in-chief of Playboy.

== Early life and education ==
Picardi grew up in Boston to a Catholic family and is openly gay.

Picardi attended Central Catholic High School, where in 2008 he was one of the founders of a now-annual student fundraiser called Catwalk4Cancer; the 2017 event raised more than $250,000. After graduating from high school, Picardi attended college at New York University.

In 2022, Picardi graduated from Harvard Divinity School with his Master in Religion and Public Life. He focused his MRPL project on conceiving and writing his forthcoming memoir, loosely titled, Is Jesus Kinda Hot? From May 1 through May 11, he published a series of posts on his newsletter Religiously Blonde, that explored some of the most important or revelatory lessons from his time at Harvard. His presentation unfolded on Religiously Blonde's Instagram account and culminated in an Instagram Live event with the New York Times bestselling author and poet Cleo Wade to celebrate the end of the program.

== Career ==
Picardi started his publishing career as an intern at Teen Vogue. He then served as online beauty editor at Teen Vogue before becoming senior beauty editor at Refinery29 in September 2014. At Refinery29 he worked for Mikki Halpin, whose influence as well as Picardi's personal experiences led to a growing interest in political engagement alongside his work on beauty; speaking to The Guardian, he said his experience growing up gay meant "I can certainly relate to what it feels like to be underrepresented or even marginalized. I took sex ed classes and there was no mention of homosexuality. Or I would sit in religion class and be told my life was a sin." Picardi has hosted a podcast about this subject called Unholier Than Thou, part of the Crooked Media podcast network. The show ran for two seasons. Picardi is currently the Chief Marketing and Communications Officer at the Los Angeles LGBT Center.

=== Teen Vogue ===
Picardi returned to Teen Vogue as digital editorial director in April 2015, the next year becoming part of a reorganization of the magazine's leadership with editor Elaine Welteroth, creative director Marie Suter and Picardi replacing departing founding editor-in-chief Amy Astley. Picardi oversees web content and social media for Teen Vogue, significantly increasing traffic to its website; in January 2017, the magazine's website had 7.9 million US visitors compared with 2.9 million the previous January. He has also been part of the magazine's shift in focus on social issues and politics, part of his pitch when he joined the magazine. He told the hiring team at Teen Vogue that he felt the magazine's success depended on offering more to its reader: "I thought it was really important to talk about reproductive rights, gender. To dig into politics and the news cycle. Basically, by omission, we were kind of assuming that she's not interested." With the growth the site has seen through this approach, Fast Company named Picardi to its "Most Creative People" in 2017, "for reading teenagers' minds" in his work to "align TeenVogue.com with every aspect of its socially conscious readers' lives": the politics section has now surpassed entertainment as the site's most-read section. Under Picardi, TeenVogue.com also won 2017 Webby Awards for both the Fashion & Beauty and the Education & Discovery categories. He left the magazine and Condé Nast in August 2018.

=== Them ===
In March 2017, his role at Condé Nast expanded to become as digital editorial director for Them as well as Teen Vogue. Under Picardi's leadership, Them has also seen a significant rise in web traffic: April 2017 had a 53% increase over the prior year (6.9 million over 4.5 million in April 2016). He left the magazine and Condé Nast in August 2018.

=== Out ===
In August 2018, Pride Media Inc. announced Picardi as the new editor-in-chief of Out. Picardi was let go from Out in December 2019, describing it as "the most complex chapter of my career so far".

=== Playboy ===
In March 2026, Picardi was appointed editor-in-chief of Playboy.
