= Them (magazine) =

American online LGBTQ magazine

- Logo since 2022
- Website type: Online magazine
- Available in: English
- Founded: October 2017; 9 years ago
- Owner: Equalpride
- Editor: Samantha Leigh Allen
- Website: www.them.us
- Commercial: Yes
- Current status: Active

Them is an American online LGBTQ magazine owned by Equalpride. Its coverage includes LGBTQ culture, fashion, and politics. The publication launched in October 2017 by Phillip Picardi and was owned by Condé Nast until 2026.

== History ==
In the 2010s, some large media companies like HuffPost, BuzzFeed News, and NBC News had created media verticals targeted at LGBTQ audiences. Grindr launched Into in 2017, and Them was announced soon after. Them began when Phillip Picardi, then the director of Teen Vogue, proposed to Anna Wintour, Condé Nast's artistic director, that the company create an online, LGBTQ-focused media platform. It was Condé Nast's first new platform since 2007, and came at a time that the company was revamping many of its digital media offerings.

Founding editors included Meredith Talusan, Tyler Ford, and James Clarizio, and launch partners included Burberry, Google, Lyft, and GLAAD. Picardi served as the site's chief content officer.

Upon the website's launch, there was some controversy over its naming, which some considered to be othering. The name is derived from the singular them pronoun, emphasizing a gender neutral approach including in its fashion coverage. On the day of Them's launch, Seventeen announced their own LGBTQ-focused programming under the Here brand, hoping to create a similar media brand targeted at a teenage audience. Gender-neutral magazines like Them were cited in 2019 as challengers to the traditional media's model of gendered magazines, which had become less successful over time.

Them, like Into, branded itself as younger, more diverse, and cooler than legacy gay media outlets like The Advocate and Out. Talusan shared that they joined the team because it was "truly intersectional" and this would help them feel supported at work, but also allow the magazine to cover issues that mattered to more queer readers. Cave Homo editor Luke Williams later criticized Them's lack of other forms of diversity, claiming its staff were "all gorgeous and 20" and that it predominantly featured conventionally attractive people.

Picardi left Them and Condé Nast in the fall of 2018 to begin working as editor-in-chief of Out magazine. By January 2019, all of the founding editors had left as well, and Whembley Sewell was named the site's new executive editor. That year, Condé Nast shared that "from both an audience and a business standpoint, we've seen consistent growth since launch" in Them. In October 2021, Sarah Burke became the new editor-in-chief of Them. In 2022, Them updated their logo and website, adding new portals for LGBTQ+ guides and queer thought leaders. Burke remained as editor-in-chief of Them until 2025, when they left the site and were replaced by Fran Tirado.

Them helped release the 2018 documentary series Trans in America, produced by the ACLU and Little By Little Films. Trans in America: Texas Strong won an Emmy for Outstanding Short Documentary in 2019. It centers on the story of a transgender girl and her conservative Christian mother who have to navigate their Houston community after the daughter comes out.

In February 2026, Them was acquired by Equalpride, publisher of Out and The Advocate. Much of the site's newsroom was laid off after Equalpride officially took ownership in April.

== Events ==
In 2020, Them hosted two virtual Pride Month events, Themfest and Out Now Live. Themfest streamed daily events like cooking shows, live comedy, drag performances, and musical shows. Out Now Live, its June 2020 virtual gay pride event, included speeches, LGBTQ history and musical performances. It was produced in collaboration with Pitchfork.

In 2022, Them launched the annual Now Awards. 12 LGBTQ+ people were honored in the first year across different categories. In 2023, 12 people also received awards, including Kristen Lovell, Andrea Jenkins, Geena Rocero, Silver Iocovozzi, and Dylan Mulvaney. The show was hosted by editor-in-chief Sarah Burke, with live performances by Luxx Noir London, Vincint, and Dee Diggs. 10 people received awards in 2024, including Reneé Rapp, Devery Jacobs, Ve'ondre Mitchell, Mauree Turner, Jinkx Monsoon, and Cecelia Gentili. Burke again hosted, with James Tom emceeing, and Zsela, OTA, Aliyah's Interlude, Ve'ondre Mitchell and George Abraham performing.

== See also ==
- Metro Weekly
- The Advocate
- Bi Women Quarterly
- List of LGBT periodicals
