= Dwight Hooker =

American photography

- Born: June 22, 1928; Albany, New York, U.S.
- Died: January 3, 2015 (aged 86); Michigan, U.S.
- Occupations: Photographer, architect
- Children: 6

Dwight Hooker (June 22, 1928 – January 3, 2015) was an American photographer and architect. He was best known as a photographer for Playboy magazine and has been described as one of the masters of "the sensual and the erotic", along with photographers Helmut Newton and J. Frederick Smith. One of his photographs became the basis of Lenna, the standard test image for image processing algorithms (such as compression and denoising) and related scientific publications.

== Career ==
Hooker photographed the centerfold featuring Lena Söderberg for the best-selling edition of Playboy, the November 1972 edition issue, which sold 7,161,561 copies. A cropped image from that pictorial, known as Lenna, became the standard test image for image processing algorithms (such as compression and denoising) and related scientific publications.

Hooker originated and provided the photographs for the magazine's commercial campaign "What sort of a man reads Playboy?", which became an example of sociodemographic segmentation for advertising campaigns. It featured young, educated and urban men who had money and were not averse to spending it and took pleasure as a duty. The campaign, with its use of undressed men and women, was ruled by the US Supreme Court to be "not obscene", although the court decision did call it "offensive".

Other milestones in Hooker's career include photographing the twins Madeleine and Mary Collinson (the first twin Playmates on Playboy, for cover and centerfold of the October 1970 issue), Marilyn Cole (the first Playmate to pose for a full frontal nude centerfold and the first Briton to hold the title of Playmate of the Year), Jayne Marie Mansfield (daughter of Jayne Mansfield), Candy Loving (the 25th Anniversary Playmate), Monica Tidwell (the first Playmate to be younger than Playboy), Nancy Cameron (the 20th Anniversary Playmate and the only Playmate to have a back and front double-sided centerfold), Marilyn Lange (both her Playmate of the Month and Playmate of the Year layouts for May 1974 and June 1975 issues respectively) and Jill De Vries (the first Playmate with signed centerfold). He also photographed Playmate and Playboy bunny Barbi Benton (actress and singer who was Hugh Hefner's girlfriend) and Emmy and Golden Globe award-winning actor Alan Alda.

Hooker mentored other Playboy photographers including Stephen Wayda. He shot the cover for the first paperback edition of Playboy's Book of Forbidden Words (1974), with model Mercy Rooney. He is reported to have the record number of rejections for a Playboy photographer when Hugh Hefner, the publisher, rejected 500 of Hooker's photographs for a centerfold.

== Personal life ==
Hooker retired from Playboy to Sundance, Utah to work as an architect. He was a regular at the Sundance Film Festival.

Hooker died in Michigan on January 3, 2015, at the age of 86.

== Playboy work ==
=== Playboy centerfolds ===
- Shay Knuth: September 1969
- Jennifer Liano: May 1970
- Mary and Madeleine Collinson: October 1970
- Avis Miller: November 1970
- Carol Imhof: December 1970
- Crystal Smith: September 1971
- Danielle de Vabre: November 1971
- Ellen Michaels: March 1972
- Deanna Baker: May 1972
- Lenna Sjööblom (also known as Lena Söderberg): November 1972
- Marilyn Cole: June 1973 (Playmate of Year, with Richard Fegley, Larry Dale Gordon and Alexas Urba)
- Monica Tidwell: November 1973
- Nancy Cameron: January 1974
- Marilyn Lange: May 1974
- Jeane Manson: August 1974
- Marilyn Lange: June 1975 (Playmate of Year)
- Lillian Müller: August 1975
- Jill De Vries: October 1975
- Laura Lyons: February 1976
- Kathryn Morrison: May 1978
- Candy Loving: January 1979
- Louann Fernald: June 1979

=== Playboy covers ===
- Barbi Benton: July 1969
- Shay Knuth: September 1969
- Jean Bell, Lorrie Menconi, Kathy MacDonald, Shay Knuth, Leslie Bianchini: January 1970 (with Don Klumpp, Bill Figge, David Chan, Mario Casilli)
- Jaime Lyn Bauer: February 1970
- Barbi Benton: March 1970
- Phyllis Babila: May 1970
- Mary and Madeleine Collinson: October 1970
- Crystal Smith: November 1970
- Mary and Madeleine Collinson, Jennifer Liano, Debbie Ellison, Sharon Clark: January 1971 (with Pompeo Posar, Bill Figge and Edward DeLong)
- Christy Miller: August 1971
- Crystal Smith: September 1971
- Debbie Hanlon: November 1971
- Rosie Holotik: April 1972
- Crystal Smith: September 1972
- Mercy Rooney: March 1973
- Marilyn Cole: June 1973
- Karen Christy: February 1974
- Ester Cordet, Bebe Buell, Marilyn Lange, Francine Parks, Nancy Cameron and Kristine Hanson: January 1975 (with Richard Fegley, Mario Casilli, David Chan)
- Marilyn Lange: June 1975
- Jill De Vries: February 1976
- Lisa Sohm: April 1977

=== Playmate pictorials ===
- Shay Knuth: September 1969
- Jennifer Liano: May 1970
- Madeleine Collinson and Mary Collinson: October 1970
- Avis Miller: November 1970
- Carol Imhof: December 1970
- Crystal Smith: September 1971
- Ellen Michaels: March 1972
- Lenna Sjööblom: November 1972
- Monica Tidwell: November 1973 (with Bill Frantz)
- Nancy Cameron: January 1974
- Marilyn Lange: May 1974
- Jeane Manson: August 1974
- Lillian Müller: August 1975 (with Suze Randall)
- Jill De Vries: October 1975
- Laura Lyons: February 1976 (with Mario Casilli)
- Kathryn Morrison: May 1978 (with Phillip Dixon)
- Candy Loving: January 1979
- Louann Fernald: June 1979

== Books ==
=== Christina series ===
A book series on imaginary heiress Christina van Bell was written by "Blakely St. James", a pseudonym for multiple authors including Robin Leonard, Charles Platt, Ted Gottfried, William E Butterworth, and Hart Williams. Hooker provided the photographs used on the front and back covers. The model for all the books is Jill De Vries.

- Christina's Quest, Playboy Press, 1976, ISBN 0-87216-885-9
- Christina's Desire, Playboy Press, 1978
- Christina's Rapture, Playboy Press, 1978
- Christina's Ecstasy, Playboy Paperbacks, 1980, ISBN 0-86721-018-4
- Christina's Sins, Playboy Press, 1980, ISBN 0-87216-729-1
- Christina Enchanted, 1980
- Christina's Promise, 1980
- A Kiss for Christina, Playboy Press, 1981
- Christina's Escape, Playboy Paperbacks, 1981, ISBN 0-87216-820-4
- Christina's Obsession, Playboy Paperbacks, 1981, ISBN 0-87216-853-0
- Christina in Love, Playboy Paperbacks, 1981, ISBN 0-87216-925-1
- Christina's Bliss, Playboy Paperbacks, 1981
- Christina's Hunger, 1981
- Christina's Delight, 1982
- Christina's Awakening, 1983
- Christina's Favorite, 1983
- Christina's Paradise, 1983
- Christina's Confessions, 1983

=== Other books ===
- The Playboy Photographer 2, Playboy Press, 1975
- Sexy Ladies, Playboy Press, 1977 (with Helmut Newton, Jeanloup Sieff, Sam Notabartolo, and others)
