= List of Playboy Playmates of 1975 =

The following is a list of Playboy Playmates of 1975. Playboy magazine names its Playmate of the Month each month throughout the year.

== January ==
Lynnda Kimball

Personal details
- Born: May 1, 1952 (age 74) Inglewood, California, U.S.
- Height: 5 ft 7 in (170 cm)

Lynnda Kimball (born May 1, 1952) is an American model. She was Playboy magazine's Playmate of the Month for the January 1975 issue. Her centerfold was photographed by Mario Casilli.

== February ==
Laura Misch

Personal details
- Born: November 23, 1953 (age 72) Tulsa, Oklahoma, U.S.
- Height: 5 ft 5 in (165 cm)

Laura Misch (born November 23, 1953) is an American model, actress, and writer. She was Playboy magazine's Playmate of the Month for the February 1975 issue. Her centerfold was photographed by Richard Fegley.

== March ==
Ingeborg Sørensen

Personal details
- Born: May 16, 1948 (age 78) Drammen, Norway
- Height: 5 ft 6 in (168 cm)

Ingeborg Sørensen (born May 16, 1948) is a Norwegian model. She was Playboy magazine's Playmate of the Month for its March 1975 issue. Her centerfold was photographed by Mario Casilli.

== April ==
Victoria Cunningham

Personal details
- Born: May 28, 1952 (age 74) Memphis, Tennessee, U.S.
- Height: 5 ft 6 in (168 cm)

Victoria Cunningham (born May 28, 1952) is an American actress and model. She was Playboy magazine's Playmate of the Month for the April 1975 issue. Her centerfold was photographed by Mario Casilli. She also appeared on the cover of the March 1976 issue of Playboy.

== May ==
Bridgett Rollins

Personal details
- Born: September 7, 1956 Smyrna, Tennessee, U.S.
- Died: February 12, 2011 (aged 54) Austin, Texas, U.S.
- Height: 5 ft 6 in (168 cm)

Bridgett Rollins (September 7, 1956 – February 12, 2011) was an American model. She was Playboy magazine's Playmate of the Month for the May 1975 issue. Her centerfold was photographed by Pompeo Posar.

Rollins died at her home, with her husband Paul Kerby Hanne and sister by her side, after a four-year battle with cancer. At the time of her death, she had two sons and a daughter.

== June ==
Azizi Johari

Personal details
- Born: August 24, 1948 (age 78) New York City, New York, U.S.
- Height: 5 ft 6 in (168 cm)

Azizi Johari (born August 24, 1948) is an American model and actress. She was Playboy magazine's Playmate of the Month for its June 1975 issue. Her centerfold was photographed by Ken Marcus.

== July ==
Lynn Schiller

Personal details
- Born: March 5, 1951 (age 75) Detroit, Michigan, U.S.
- Height: 5 ft 3 in (160 cm)

Lynn Schiller (born March 5, 1951) is an American model and actress. She was Playboy magazine's Playmate of the Month for its July 1975 issue. Her centerfold was photographed by Larry Dale Gordon.

== August ==
Lillian Müller

Playboy Playmate of the Year
- 1976
- Preceded by: Marilyn Lange
- Succeeded by: Patti McGuire

Personal details
- Born: August 19, 1951 (age 75) Grimstad, Norway
- Height: 5 ft 8 in (173 cm)

Lillian Müller (born August 19, 1951) is a Norwegian model and an actress in motion pictures and television. A "Page Three girl" on January 30, 1974, Müller achieved her major breakthrough after being spotted by Suze Randall, who photographed her centerfold (along with Dwight Hooker) for Playboy. Müller appeared in the magazine as Playmate of the Month in August 1975, and was subsequently named Playmate of the Year in 1976.

Müller appeared in Van Halen's "Hot for Teacher" video and portrayed Rod Stewart's love interest in his 1978 video "Da Ya Think I'm Sexy?"

She is sometimes credited as Inga Anderssen, Lillian Mueller, Yulis Revel, Yuliis Ruval, or Yullis Ruval.

== September ==
Mesina Miller

Personal details
- Born: July 7, 1953 (age 73) Scottsdale, Arizona, U.S.
- Height: 5 ft 4 in (163 cm)

Mesina Miller (born July 7, 1953) is an American model. She was Playboy magazine's Playmate of the Month for its September 1975 issue. Her centerfold was photographed by William Figge, Mel Figge, and Suze Randall.

== October ==
Jill De Vries

Personal details
- Born: July 20, 1953 (age 73) Kankakee, Illinois, U.S.
- Height: 5 ft 7 in (170 cm)

Jill De Vries (born July 20, 1953) is an American model. She was Playboy magazine's Playmate of the Month for the October 1975 issue. Her centerfold was photographed by Dwight Hooker. De Vries's was the first Playboy gatefold to be signed by the model. De Vries was studying to be a teacher at the time of her pictorial. She appeared briefly as a call girl in the 1983 comedy Risky Business. She was also the cover model for the Christina novels.

== November ==
Janet Lupo

Personal details
- Born: January 26, 1950 Hoboken, New Jersey, U.S.
- Died: November 13, 2017 (aged 67) Jersey City, New Jersey, U.S.
- Height: 5 ft 6 in (168 cm)

Janet Paula Lupo (January 26, 1950 – November 13, 2017) was an American model and the Playboy Playmate of the Month for November 1975. Her centerfold was photographed by Pompeo Posar. Lupo posed for an April 1984 Playboy pictorial, "Playmates Forever! Part Two". She was also a Playboy Bunny at the resort in Great Gorge, New Jersey.

By 1981, Lupo had a license to sell real estate. In 1986, she had a son (with Mark Settembre, a real estate developer and movie producer and philanthropist). She was a single mother. A few years later, she obtained a cosmetology license. She also ran an internet business marketing "Fountain of Youth" body oil.

Lupo died in Jersey City, New Jersey, after a 4-year battle with cancer, at the age of 67.

== December ==
Nancie Li Brandi

Personal details
- Born: August 30, 1954 (age 72) Johnstown, Pennsylvania, U.S.
- Height: 5 ft 6 in (168 cm)

Nancie Li Brandi (born August 30, 1954) is an American model. She was Playboy magazine's Playmate of the Month for the December 1975 issue. Her centerfold was photographed by Richard Fegley. The centerfold of Miss June 1993, Alesha Oreskovich, was modeled after that of Li Brandi.

== See also ==
- List of people in Playboy 1970–1979

Lynnda Kimball	Laura Misch	Ingeborg Sorensen	Victoria Cunningham	Bridgett Rollins	Azizi Johari
Lynn Schiller	Lillian Müller	Mesina Miller	Jill De Vries	Janet Lupo	Nancie Li Brandi
