= Sondra Theodore =

American model (born 1956)

Playboy centerfold appearance
- July 1977
- Preceded by: Virve Reid
- Succeeded by: Julia Lyndon

Personal details
- Born: Sondra Jo Theodore; December 12, 1956 (age 69) San Bernardino, California
- Height: 5 ft 6 in (1.68 m)

Sondra Theodore (born December 12, 1956) is an American model and actress. She was Playboy magazine's Playmate of the Month for its July 1977 issue. Her centerfold was photographed by Ken Marcus. Her Playmate pictorial was the first to include the Data Sheets that Playmates had been filling out since 1959.

Theodore was born in San Bernardino, California. At age 17, Theodore played the lead role in a local San Bernardino summer youth theatre musical production of Cinderella in 1974. The next year in honor of the United States Bicentennial, she represented her native city as Miss Bicentennial. She spent one year at college before heading west to Los Angeles in July 1976 to pursue a career in acting.

Briefly a Sunday school teacher, Theodore became the girlfriend of Playboy publisher Hugh Hefner for several years, living alongside him at the Playboy Mansion. She can be seen on the famous Playboy pinball machine alongside Hefner and fellow Playmate Patti McGuire. During this time she sang with the "Singing Playmates". Sondra Theodore has made guest appearances on TV in The Bob Newhart Show, CHiPs, Fantasy Island, Barnaby Jones, and Pink Lady. She had small roles in the theatrical films Skateboard and The Man Who Loved Women.

In 2021, she spoke out about her trauma during her time with Hefner and the difficulties she endured in the docuseries Secrets of Playboy on the A&E Network. She claimed that Hefner was into bestiality and snuff films. In an interview with Fox News Digital in August 2022, Theodore claimed that Hefner manipulated her into participating in an orgy. She also alleged that Hefner hosted prostitution sex parties, referring to them as "Pig Nights."

Susan Kiger	Star Stowe	Nicki Thomas	Lisa Sohm	Sheila Mullen	Virve Reid
Sondra Theodore	Julia Lyndon	Debra Jo Fondren	Kristine Winder	Rita Lee	Ashley Cox
