= List of Playboy Playmates of 1977 =

The following is a list of Playboy Playmates of 1977. Playboy magazine named its Playmate of the Month each month throughout the year.

== January ==
Susan Kiger

Personal details
- Born: November 16, 1953 (age 72) Pasadena, California, United States
- Height: 5 ft 8 in (1.73 m)

Susan Lynn Kiger (born November 16, 1953, in Pasadena, California) is an American model and actress. Her centerfold was photographed by Pompeo Posar and Ken Marcus. She appeared in the cover of Playboy three times: March 1977, November 1977, April 1978.

Kiger was the first Playmate to perform in a hardcore sex film, 'Hot Nasties' (1976). After her Playmate designation, she appeared in several other films, including the sex comedy H.O.T.S. alongside fellow Playmate Pamela Bryant, and eventual Playboy model KC Winkler.

== February ==
Star Stowe

Personal details
- Born: March 19, 1956 Little Rock, Arkansas, U.S.
- Died: March 16, 1997 (aged 40) Coral Springs, Florida, U.S.
- Height: 5 ft 6 in (1.68 m)

Star Stowe (born Ellen Louise Stowe; March 19, 1956, in Little Rock, Arkansas – died March 16, 1997, in Coral Springs, Florida) was an American model. She was Playboy magazine's Playmate of the Month for its February 1977 issue. Her centerfold was photographed by Pompeo Posar.

Stowe at one time dated Gene Simmons. She later married and divorced Peter Maligo. Together they had a son, Michael. After falling from the spotlight and moving to Fort Lauderdale, Florida she fell into prostitution, alcoholism, and drug abuse and was ultimately murdered.

== March ==
Nicki Thomas

Personal details
- Born: Nancy Elizabeth Tritt; March 22, 1954 Berwyn, Illinois
- Died: September 2, 2009 (aged 55)
- Height: 5 ft 5 in (1.65 m)

Nicki Thomas or Nicki E. Rossine (born Nancy Elizabeth Tritt on March 22, 1954, in Berwyn, Illinois – died September 2, 2009) was an American model. She was Playboy magazine's Playmate of the Month for its March 1977 issue. Her centerfold was photographed by Pompeo Posar.

Tritt married Anthony Rossine, and had two children, Michael Anthony and Marissa Nicole. She died September 2, 2009, in Edgewood, Kentucky.

== April ==
Lisa Sohm

Personal details
- Born: March 21, 1955 (age 71) Vancouver, Washington
- Height: 5 ft 8 in (1.73 m)

Lisa Sohm (born March 21, 1955, in Vancouver, Washington) is an American model. She was Playboy magazine's Playmate of the Month for its April 1977 issue. Her centerfold was photographed by Pompeo Posar.

== May ==
Sheila Mullen

Personal details
- Born: November 7, 1957 (age 68) Hollywood, United States
- Height: 5 ft 9 in (1.75 m)

Sheila Mullen (born November 7, 1957, in Hollywood) is an American model. She was Playboy magazine's Playmate of the Month for its May 1977 issue. Her centerfold was photographed by Ken Marcus. Mullen worked as a Bunny at the Los Angeles Playboy Club.

== June ==
Virve Reid

Personal details
- Born: November 24, 1956 (age 69) Vancouver, British Columbia, Canada
- Height: 5 ft 2.5 in (1.59 m)

Virve Reid (born November 24, 1956, in Vancouver, British Columbia) is a Canadian model of Scottish, English and Estonian descent. She was Playboy magazine's Playmate of the Month for its June 1977 issue. Her centerfold was photographed by Grant Edwards and Phillip Dixon.

== July ==
Sondra Theodore

Personal details
- Born: Sondra Jo Theodore; December 12, 1956 (age 69) San Bernardino, California
- Height: 5 ft 6 in (1.68 m)

Sondra Theodore (born December 12, 1956, in San Bernardino, California) is an American model and actress. She was Playboy magazine's Playmate of the Month for its July 1977 issue. Her centerfold was photographed by Ken Marcus. Her Playmate pictorial was the first to include the Data Sheets that Playmates had been filling out since 1959.

A former Sunday school teacher, Theodore became the girlfriend of Playboy publisher Hugh Hefner for several years, living alongside him at the Playboy Mansion. She can be seen on the famous Playboy pinball machine alongside Hefner and fellow Playmate Patti McGuire. During this time she sang with the "Singing Playmates".

At age 17, Theodore played the lead role in a local San Bernardino summer youth theatre musical production of Cinderella in 1974. The next year, she represented her native city as Miss Bicentennial. She spent one year at college before heading west to Los Angeles in July 1976 to pursue a career in acting.

== August ==
Julia Lyndon

Personal details
- Born: Lisa Moira Rome; August 6, 1957 Upper Sandusky, Ohio, United States
- Died: August 1, 2019 (aged 61) Los Angeles, California
- Height: 5 ft 6 in (1.68 m)

Julia Lyndon (born August 6, 1957, in Upper Sandusky, Ohio; died August 1, 2019, in Los Angeles, California) is the pseudonym for an American model. Her given name was Lisa Rome. She was Playboy magazine's Playmate of the Month for its August 1977 issue. Her centerfold was photographed by Phillip Dixon.

Lisa, the sister of actress Sydne Rome, was an equestrienne who had been in training for the 1976 Summer Olympics. In 1996 The Playmate Book reported that she was running a restaurant in South America. She died at home in West Los Angeles on August 1, 2019, from an overdose of over-the-counter medications: aspirin, Tylenol and Sudafed. Her remains are interred in Akron, Ohio.

== September ==
Debra Jo Fondren

Playboy Playmate of the Year
- 1978
- Preceded by: Patti McGuire
- Succeeded by: Monique St. Pierre

Personal details
- Born: February 5, 1955 (age 71) Los Angeles, California
- Height: 5 ft 4 in (1.63 m)

Debra Jo Fondren (born February 5, 1955) is an American model and actress. She was Playboy magazine's Playmate of the Month for the September 1977 issue and Playmate of the Year for 1978. Fondren, who lived in Beaumont, Texas, was discovered on a visit to Las Vegas by photographer Robert Scott Hooper who also photographed her centerfold.

Today, Fondren no longer participates in Playboy promotions because they place "too much emphasis on sex."

== October ==
Kristine Winder

Personal details
- Born: October 15, 1955 Vancouver, British Columbia, Canada
- Died: March 14, 2011 (aged 55)
- Height: 5 ft 6 in (1.68 m)

Kristine Winder (born October 15, 1955, in Vancouver, British Columbia and died March 14, 2011) is the pseudonym of a Canadian model. She was Playboy magazine's Playmate of the Month for its October 1977 issue. Her centerfold was photographed by Mario Casilli. Her pictorial was titled "Invitation to the Dance", with nude shots of her in a dance studio.

Winder used a pseudonym because she did not want her father to find out, but the name change did not help. Several families in Vancouver with the Winder last name received obscene phone calls from people across North America looking for "Kristine Winder".

== November ==
Rita Lee

Personal details
- Born: June 15, 1953 (age 73) Frederic, Wisconsin, United States
- Height: 5 ft 10 in (1.78 m)

Rita Lee (born June 15, 1953, in Frederic, Wisconsin) is an American model. She was Playboy magazine's Playmate of the Month for its November 1977 issue. Her centerfold was photographed by Richard Fegley. She was the magazine's cover model three times in the ensuing three years.

== December ==
Ashley Cox

Personal details
- Born: November 15, 1956 (age 69) Dallas, Texas
- Height: 5 ft 8 in (1.73 m)

Ashley Cox (born November 15, 1956) is an American model and actress. She was Playboy magazine's Playmate of the Month for its December 1977 issue. Her centerfold was photographed by Mario Casilli, Phillip Dixon and Arny Freytag.

== See also ==
- List of people in Playboy 1970–1979

Susan Kiger	Star Stowe	Nicki Thomas	Lisa Sohm	Sheila Mullen	Virve Reid
Sondra Theodore	Julia Lyndon	Debra Jo Fondren	Kristine Winder	Rita Lee	Ashley Cox
