= Lena Forsén =

Swedish model

Playboy centerfold appearance
- November 1972
- Preceded by: Sharon Johansen
- Succeeded by: Mercy Rooney

Personal details
- Born: 31 March 1951 (age 75) Sweden

Lena Forsén (Swedish: [ˈlêːna fʊˈʂeːn]), previously Söderberg (born Sjööblom; born 31 March 1951), is a Swedish model who appeared as a Playmate in the November 1972 issue of Playboy magazine, as Lenna Sjööblom. Her centerfold was photographed by Dwight Hooker. The photograph would later become a ubiquitous standard test image in the field of digital image processing under the title Lenna.

== Career ==
=== Modelling ===
Forsén's career began by modelling jewellery and for catalogues in Chicago, Illinois, after moving to the United States from Sweden to be an au pair for a family member. In 1972, she was shot for the centerfold of the November issue of Playboy magazine. After that, she moved to Rochester, New York, and became a "Shirley" – a Kodak model – while moonlighting as a bartender. Thereafter she appeared on a large number of Kodak publications, including in ads for products, in catalogs, and on instruction booklets.

=== Lenna ===
A cropped version (the head and shoulder section) of her centerfold, known as Lenna, has become a standard test image that is often used to test algorithms in digital image processing. She was a guest at the 50th annual Conference of the Society for Imaging Science and Technology (IS&T) in 1997, where she gave a presentation about herself. Because of the ubiquity of her Playboy photo scan, she has been called the "first lady of the internet". The title was given to her by Jeff Seideman in a press release he issued announcing her appearance at the 50th annual IS&T Conference. In January 2019 she said that while she wished she had been better compensated, she was "really proud of that picture". However, in a short documentary titled Losing Lena that premiered in North America in November that year, she says, "I retired from modeling a long time ago. It's time I retired from tech, too."

=== After modelling ===
In 1997, Forsén worked for a government agency supervising disabled employees, archiving data using computers and scanners.

== Personal life ==
Forsén has been married twice, has three children, and multiple grandchildren.

== See also ==
- List of people in Playboy 1970–1979

Marilyn Cole	P. J. Lansing	Ellen Michaels	Vicki Peters	Deanna Baker	Debbie Davis
Carol O'Neal	Linda Summers	Susan Miller	Sharon Johansen	Lena Söderberg	Mercy Rooney
