= Sharon Johansen =

American model and actress (born 1948)

Playboy centerfold appearance
- October 1972
- Preceded by: Susan Miller
- Succeeded by: Lenna Sjööblom

Personal details
- Born: October 11, 1948 (age 76); Norway
- Height: 5 ft 8 in (1.73 m)

Sharon Johansen (born October 11, 1948) is an American model and actress. She was Playboy magazine's Playmate of the Month for its October 1972 issue. Her centerfold was photographed by Alexas Urba.

Johansen was born in Norway, but when she was a year old her family moved to Wisconsin.

For a brief time, Johansen worked as a receptionist for Pierre Salinger.

She posed nude for the December 1979 Playboy pictorial "Playmates Forever!".

== Select filmography ==
- Charlie's Angels – "He Married an Angel" (1981) TV Episode .... Ms. Fricke
- The Jerk (1979) as Mrs. Lenore Hartounian
- Your Three Minutes Are Up (1973) as Ilsa Johansen
- Barnaby Jones – "To Catch a Dead Man" (1973) TV Episode .... Waitress
- Columbo: Dagger of the Mind (1972/TV) as Miss Dudley

Marilyn Cole	P. J. Lansing	Ellen Michaels	Vicki Peters	Deanna Baker	Debbie Davis
Carol O'Neal	Linda Summers	Susan Miller	Sharon Johansen	Lena Söderberg	Mercy Rooney
