= List of Playboy Playmates of 1971 =

The following is a list of Playboy Playmates of 1971. Playboy magazine names its Playmate of the Month each month throughout the year.

== January ==
Liv Lindeland

Playboy Playmate of the Year
- 1972
- Preceded by: Sharon Clark
- Succeeded by: Marilyn Cole

Personal details
- Born: 7 December 1945 (age 80) Norway
- Height: 5 ft 7.5 in (171 cm)

Liv Lindeland (born 7 December 1945, Norway) is a Norwegian model and actress. She is Playboy's Playmate of the Month for January 1971, and Playmate of the Year for 1972. Her original pictorial was photographed by Alexas Urba. Lindeland was the daughter-in-law of actress-dancer Cyd Charisse.

== February ==
Willy Rey

Personal details
- Born: 25 August 1949 Rotterdam, the Netherlands
- Died: 19 August 1973 (aged 23)
- Height: 5 ft 4 in (1.63 m)

Willy Rey (born Wilhelmina Rietveld on 25 August 1949 in Rotterdam, the Netherlands, died 19 August 1973 in Vancouver, British Columbia) was a Dutch-Canadian model. She was Playboy's Playmate of the Month for its February 1971 issue. Her centerfold was photographed by Mario Casilli.

When she was 6 years old, her family moved from the Netherlands to Canada.

Willy Rey's nude likeness adorned the stock certificate of Playboy Enterprises from the time of its initial public offering on 3 November 1971 until June 1990, when it was replaced with a clothed figure. The image on the certificate was replaced due to the expense of servicing the large number of shareholders owning only a single share.

She died of an overdose of barbiturates (sleeping pills) in Vancouver on 19 August 1973.

== March ==
Cynthia Hall

Personal details
- Born: April 1, 1951 (age 75) Hinsdale, Illinois, United States
- Height: 5 ft 2 in (157 cm)

Cynthia Hall (born April 1, 1951, in Hinsdale, Illinois) is an American model. She is best known as Playboy's Playmate of the Month for its March 1971 issue. Her centerfold was photographed by David Chan.

== April ==
Chris Cranston

Personal details
- Born: September 14, 1946 (age 79) Santa Monica, California
- Height: 5 ft 7.5 in (1.71 m)

Chris Cranston (born September 14, 1946, in Santa Monica, California) is an American model and actress. She is best known for being Playboy's Playmate of the Month for its April 1971 issue. Her centerfold was photographed by Mario Casilli.

== May ==
Janice Pennington

Personal details
- Born: July 8, 1942 (age 84) Seattle, Washington, US
- Height: 5 ft 8 in (1.73 m)

Janice Marie Pennington (born July 8, 1942, in Seattle, Washington) was one of the original "Barker's Beauties" models on The Price Is Right, serving as the show's longest-running model to date, from 1972 to 2000. She was also Playboy's Playmate of the Month for the May 1971 issue. She is the older sister of fellow model (and March 1976 Playmate) Ann Pennington. Pennington is also the co-founder of the Hollywood Film Festival.

== June ==
Lieko English

Personal details
- Born: June 3, 1947 (age 79) Okinawa, Japan
- Height: 5 ft 5 in (1.65 m)

Lieko English (born June 3, 1947, in Okinawa, Japan) is an American model and actress. She is known for being Playboy's Playmate of the Month for its June 1971 issue. She is also notable for having represented Okinawa in the Miss Universe contest in 1965. When she was 12 years old, she moved with her family from Okinawa to Oklahoma City. English was the first Japanese-born Playmate, the first American Playmate of Japanese ancestry, and the first hapa Playmate.

== July ==
Heather Van Every

Personal details
- Born: September 14, 1951 (age 74) Illinois
- Height: 5 ft 4 in (1.63 m)

Heather Van Every (born September 14, 1951, in Illinois) is an American model. She was Playboy's Playmate of the Month for the July 1971 issue. Her centerfold was photographed by David Chan. She was born in Illinois and became a Bunny at the Denver Playboy Club, remaining there after her Playmate appearance. Her centerfold was briefly shown in Fear and Loathing in Las Vegas.

== August ==
Cathy Rowland

Personal details
- Born: March 11, 1950 (age 76) Los Angeles, California
- Height: 5 ft 5.5 in (1.66 m)

Cathleen Lynn Rowland (born March 11, 1950, in Los Angeles, California) is an American model. She was Playboy's Playmate of the Month for the August 1971 issue. Her centerfold was photographed by Mario Casilli.

The August 1971 issue also featured Playboy's first National Football League season preview.

== September ==
Crystal Smith

Personal details
- Born: August 2, 1951 (age 75) Kansas City, Missouri
- Height: 5 ft 7 in (1.70 m)

Crystal Smith (born August 2, 1951, in Kansas City, Missouri) is an American model and journalist. She was Playboy's Playmate of the Month for its September 1971 issue. At the time, Smith was a student at Kansas State University. Her centerfold was photographed by Dwight Hooker. Crystal was a two-time cover girl, as well as anchor for the popular Sexcetera news program on the Playboy Channel during its first eight years. She also hosted The Playboy Shopping Show with Blake Emmons in 1986.

== October ==
Claire Rambeau

Personal details
- Born: May 8, 1951 (age 75) Santa Barbara, California, United States
- Height: 5 ft 11 in (1.80 m)

Claire Rambeau (born May 8, 1951, in Santa Barbara, California) is an American model. She was Playboy's Playmate of the Month for the October 1971 issue. Her centerfold was photographed by Pompeo Posar. Her centerfold picture appeared in the first German edition of Playboy.

== November ==
Danielle de Vabre

Personal details
- Born: November 19, 1949 (age 76) Montreal, Quebec, Canada
- Height: 5 ft 4.5 in (1.64 m)

Danielle de Vabre (born November 19, 1949, in Montreal) is a French-Canadian model. She was Playboy's Playmate of the Month for November 1971.

== December ==
Karen Christy

Personal details
- Born: March 11, 1951 (age 75) Abilene, Texas
- Height: 5 ft 6 in (1.68 m)

Karen Christy (born March 11, 1951, in Abilene, Texas) is an American model. She was Playboy's Playmate of the Month for the December 1971 issue. Her centerfold was photographed by Pompeo Posar. She was also a Playboy Bunny at the Chicago club.

== See also ==
- List of people in Playboy 1970–1979

Liv Lindeland	Willy Rey	Cynthia Hall	Chris Cranston	Janice Pennington	Lieko English
Heather Van Every	Cathy Rowland	Crystal Smith	Claire Rambeau	Danielle de Vabre	Karen Christy
