= Rambeau =

Rambeau is a surname. Notable people with the surname include:

- Claire Rambeau (born 1951), American model
- Eddie Rambeau (born 1943), American singer
- Marjorie Rambeau (1889–1970), American film and stage actress
- Pascal Rambeau (born 1972), French sailor

== Fictional characters ==
- Monica Rambeau, a comic book superheroine in the Marvel Comics universe
