= Kristine Hanson =

American television broadcaster (born 1951)

Playboy centerfold appearance
- September 1974
- Preceded by: Jeane Manson
- Succeeded by: Ester Cordet

Personal details
- Born: September 23, 1951 (age 74); Illinois, United States
- Height: 5 ft 5.5 in (1.66 m)

Kristine Hanson (born September 23, 1951, in Illinois) is an American television broadcaster who also was Playboy magazine's Playmate of the Month for the September 1974 issue. Her centerfold was photographed by David Chan.

She was previously the host of DIY Network's The Dirt on Gardening.

Hanson has been the weather presenter on KTXL and KCRA in Sacramento, California, on KTVU, KGO, and KRON in San Francisco, and KZST in Santa Rosa, California. She is currently a meteorologist on KOVR in Sacramento, California.

She won an Emmy Award and a first place award for American Women in Radio and Television.

She holds communication studies and theatre arts degrees from California State University, Sacramento and a degree in meteorology from San Francisco State University.

== See also ==
- List of people in Playboy 1970–1979

| Nancy Cameron | Francine Parks | Pamela Zinszer | Marlene Morrow | Marilyn Lange | Sandy Johnson |
| Carol Vitale | Jean Manson | Kristine Hanson | Ester Cordet | Bebe Buell | Janice Raymond |
