= Hafter =

Hafter may refer to:

- Hafter, the flat attachment of certain shrubs or lichens to a substrate
- Karen Hafter (born 1954), Playboy centerfold for December 1976

== See also ==
- Haftar
- Hafting
