= Candy Loving =

American model (born 1956)

Playboy centerfold appearance
- January 1979
- Preceded by: Janet Quist
- Succeeded by: Lee Ann Michelle

Personal details
- Born: September 4, 1956 (age 70) Oswego, Kansas, United States
- Height: 5 ft 7 in (1.70 m)

Candy Loving (born Candis Loving; September 4, 1956) is an American model. She was Playboy's Playmate of the Month for the January 1979 issue, which made her the magazine's 25th Anniversary Playmate. Her centerfold was photographed by Dwight Hooker.

== Early life ==
Loving was born Candis Loving in Oswego, Kansas, on September 4, 1956, and moved to Ponca City, Oklahoma, at the age of three with her mother and four siblings. She graduated from Ponca City High School in 1974 and married Ron Prather. She then enrolled as a public relations major at the University of Oklahoma.

== Playboy career ==
In 1978, Playboy began a yearlong nationwide Great Playmate Hunt for its 25th-anniversary publication. She was a junior at the University of Oklahoma, and working in a dress shop and as a waitress when she saw the ad in the paper. At the urging of her then-husband, Loving entered the contest and photographer Dwight Hooker shot the test photos of her. Seven months later the 22-year-old college student beat out more than 3,500 other models. Her centerfold came out in the January 1979 issue. That year, she took advantage of her celebrity status and moved out to California to pursue acting and modeling. She traveled the world as the ambassador of Playboy magazine during the 25th-anniversary celebrations, taking a year out of college to do so. Promotional appearances included the National Press Club in Washington D.C., and hosting a men's fashion show. In 2001, the readers of Playboy would vote her the runner-up for "the sexiest Playmate of the 1970s."

== Post Playboy ==
At the time of her January 1979 centerfold appearance Loving was a senior at the University of Oklahoma studying public relations. By 1981 she realized celebrity life was not for her, so at age 24 she re-enrolled at the University of Oklahoma to finish her bachelor's degree in journalism and later began a Master of Arts degree in human relations. She used the money from her work at Playboy to fund her studies. She continued to perform publicity duties for the magazine, including signing posters at car shows, and considering her career options. She later met Tampa Bay Buccaneers offensive lineman Dave Reavis when both were judging a beauty pageant. She followed him to Tampa in July 1983. Even though their relationship did not last, she remained in southern Florida, working in the healthcare industry designing benefit packages for companies. She is no longer married but has one daughter.

== Filmography ==
- Dance Fever (TV Series) (1979) as herself
- The Misadventures of Sheriff Lobo playing "Herself" in episode: "Who's the Sexiest Girl in the World" (episode # 1.16), February 19, 1980
- Woody Allen's Stardust Memories (1980) only in the walk-on scene at the end as Tony's girlfriend
- Playboy Playmates: The Early Years (documentary) (1982) as herself
- Playboy Video Centerfold: Playmate 2000 Bernaola Twins (Video documentary) (2000) as herself
- Playboy: The Party Continues (documentary) (2000) as herself
- Playboy: The Ultimate Playmate Search (documentary) (2003) as herself
- Playboy: 50 Years of Playmates (documentary) (2004) as herself

== See also ==
- List of people in Playboy 1970–1979
- List of Playboy Playmates of 1979

Candy Loving	Lee Ann Michelle	Denise McConnell	Missy Cleveland	Michele Drake	Louann Fernald
Dorothy Mays	Dorothy Stratten	Vicki McCarty	Ursula Buchfellner	Sylvie Garant	Candace Collins
