= Lillian Müller =

Norwegian model and actress (born 1951)

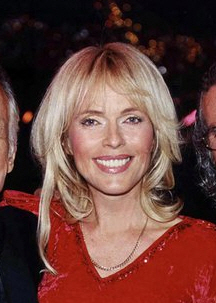
- Müller in 2000

Playboy centerfold appearance
- August 1975
- Preceded by: Lynn Schiller
- Succeeded by: Mesina Miller

Playboy Playmate of the Year
- 1976
- Preceded by: Marilyn Lange
- Succeeded by: Patti McGuire

Personal details
- Born: 19 August 1951 (age 75) Grimstad, Norway
- Height: 5 ft 8 in (1.73 m)
- Official website

Lillian Müller (born 19 August 1951) is a Norwegian model and an actress in motion pictures and television. She was born in Grimstad, Norway.

== Early life ==
Müller grew up in Fevik. From the age of 11 to 15 she lived in an orphanage. As an 18-year-old, she participated in Miss Norway and finished as the runner-up. She repeated this result in Miss International. She attended Kvitsund Gymnas in Kviteseid Municipality for two years, and Hornnes upper secondary school in Hornnes. She then travelled to London, where she attended the London Academy of Modelling.

== Career ==
A "Page Three Girl" five times, her first appearance was in January 1974. Müller achieved her major breakthrough after being spotted by Suze Randall, who photographed her Playboy cover and shot her Playmate pictorial (the centerfold was photographed by Dwight Hooker). Müller appeared in the magazine as Playmate of the Month in August 1975 and was named Playmate of the Year in 1976. She appeared on the cover of Playboy nine times between 1975 and 1999.

Müller also appeared in Van Halen's music video "Hot for Teacher" as the physical education teacher. In 1978, she portrayed Rod Stewart's love interest in his video "Da Ya Think I'm Sexy?"

She is sometimes credited as Yuliis Ruval.

In the 1990s, she became a published author of a self-help book and an autobiography.

In 2010, she was awarded the title of PETA's "Sexiest Vegetarian Over 50". She is also a personal health consultant and a public speaker. She was a juror for the final of Frøken Norge 2011.

== Filmography ==
- Rosemary's Daughter (1976) .... Annemarie Nitribitt
- Casanova & Co. (1977) .... Beata
- The Night They Took Miss Beautiful (1977) (TV) .... Lillie Schaefer
- Women in Hospital (1977)
- Hometown USA (1979) (as Yuliis Ruval) .... Mrs. Rodney C. Duckworth
- Once Upon a Spy (1980) (TV) (as Yuliis Ruval)
- Miracle on Ice (1981) (TV) .... Stewardess
- Death Ray 2000 (1981) (TV) (as Yuliis Ruval) .... Ilse Lander
- The Devil and Max Devlin (1981) .... Veronica (Devil Council)
- King of the Mountain (1981) .... Jamie Winter
- Best Defense (1984) (as Yuliis Ruval) .... French Singer
- Stewardess School (1986) (as Yuliis Ruval) .... Beautiful Blonde

=== Notable TV guest appearances ===
- The Howard Stern Show
- Først & sist
- Remington Steele
- Magnum, P.I.
- Charlie's Angels
- Fantasy Island
- Starsky & Hutch

In 2010, she was also featured in a Norwegian television show about Norwegian women having success in Hollywood, the show was titled Ja, vi elsker Hollywood! (Yes, we love Hollywood!)

In 2012, she appeared in season 8 of Skal vi danse?, the Norwegian version of Dancing with the Stars, being partnered with Glenn Jørgen Sandaker. The same year, she appeared in season 2, episode 3 of Norwegian talk show I kveld med YLVIS [Tonight with Ylvis].

== Personal life ==
She was in a relationship with Playboy founder Hugh Hefner between 1976 and 1977, and has also been romantically linked to actor Tom Selleck. She has a daughter, born around 1991. As of 2020, she has never married. She is a practitioner of veganism.

== Publications ==
- Müller, Lillian (2019). Si JA til livet!!. Norway: Prego Mobil AS. ISBN 978-82-93369-17-2.
- Müller, Lillian (1995). Feel Great, be Beautiful Over 40!. Los Angeles: General Publishing Group. ISBN 978-1-881649-61-8. OCLC 33230786.
- Müller, Lillian; Benkow, Bjørn (1998). Usminket historien om Lillian Müller, et norsk barnehjemsbarn, som er blitt at av verdens største sexsymboler [The unadorned story of Lillian Müller, a Norwegian orphanage child, who has become one of the world's biggest sex symbols] (in Norwegian Bokmål). Oslo: LibriArte. ISBN 978-82-445-0289-4. OCLC 1028395927.

Lynnda Kimball	Laura Misch	Ingeborg Sorensen	Victoria Cunningham	Bridgett Rollins	Azizi Johari
Lynn Schiller	Lillian Müller	Mesina Miller	Jill De Vries	Janet Lupo	Nancie Li Brandi
