= Debra Jo Fondren =

American model and actress

Playboy centerfold appearance
- September 1977
- Preceded by: Julia Lyndon
- Succeeded by: Kristine Winder

Playboy Playmate of the Year
- 1978
- Preceded by: Patti McGuire
- Succeeded by: Monique St. Pierre

Personal details
- Born: February 5, 1955 (age 71) Los Angeles, California
- Height: 5 ft 4 in (1.63 m)

Debra Jo Fondren (born February 5, 1955) is an American model and actress. She was Playboy magazine's Playmate of the Month for the September 1977 issue and she was named Playmate of the Year for 1978. Her pictorial was photographed by Robert Scott Hooper.

== Career ==
Fondren, who lived in Lumberton, Texas, and was working as a waitress at Gallagher's in Beaumont, Texas, was discovered on a visit to Las Vegas by photographer Robert Scott Hooper, who also photographed her centerfold, featuring her very long, almost knee-length blonde hair. Fondren had guest-starring roles on television series such as Mork & Mindy and Fantasy Island. She also appeared in movies such as Spit Fire. In 2007, she returned home to the Lumberton/Silsbee, Texas, area, having stated she could not afford to live in an expensive city and now operates a beauty school in her home area.

== Filmography ==
- Mork & Mindy
- Knots Landing
- Fantasy Island
- Family Feud

Susan Kiger	Star Stowe	Nicki Thomas	Lisa Sohm	Sheila Mullen	Virve Reid
Sondra Theodore	Julia Lyndon	Debra Jo Fondren	Kristine Winder	Rita Lee	Ashley Cox
