= List of Playboy Playmates of 1978 =

The following is a list of Playboy Playmates of 1978. Playboy magazine names their Playmate of the Month each month throughout the year.

== January ==
Debra Jensen

Personal details
- Born: March 12, 1958 (age 68) Orange County, California, United States
- Height: 5 ft 8 in (1.73 m)

Debra Jensen (born Debra Svensk March 12, 1958, in Orange County, California) is an American model. She was Playboy magazine's Playmate of the Month for its January 1978 issue. Her centerfold was photographed by Phillip Dixon.

After her Playmate appearance, Debra married Kiss drummer Peter Criss; the two eventually divorced.

== February ==
Janis Schmitt

Personal details
- Born: March 14, 1947 (age 79) St. Louis, Missouri
- Height: 5 ft 4 in (1.63 m)

Janis Schmitt (born March 14, 1947, in St. Louis, Missouri) is an American model and actress. She was Playboy magazine's Playmate of the Month for its February 1978 issue. Her centerfold was photographed by Ken Marcus. Schmitt worked as a bunny at the Playboy Club in St Louis.

== March ==
Christina Smith

Personal details
- Born: October 4, 1957 (age 68) Miami, Florida
- Height: 5 ft 6 in (1.68 m)

Christina Smith (born October 4, 1957, in Miami, Florida) is an American model. She was Playboy magazine's Playmate of the Month for March 1978. She also appeared in The Girls of Summer Special Editions at least twice, was profiled in Playboy's "Pop Questions" section in Playboy's April 2008 edition, and was most recently profiled in Playboy's Wet 'n' Wild Special Edition in January 2015. Christina Smith was the first Playmate Arny Freytag ever photographed for Playboy.

== April ==
Pamela Bryant

Personal details
- Born: February 8, 1959 Indianapolis, Indiana
- Died: December 4, 2010 (aged 51)
- Height: 5 ft 5 in (1.65 m)

Pamela Jean Bryant (born February 8, 1959, in Indianapolis, Indiana – December 4, 2010) was an American model and actress. She was Playboy magazine's Playmate of the Month for its April 1978 issue. Her centerfold was photographed by Richard Fegley. Bryant first appeared in Playboy in the September 1977 pictorial "The Girls of the Big Ten". Bryant worked as an artist before her death of an asthma attack.

== May ==
Kathryn Morrison

Personal details
- Born: October 2, 1955 (age 70) Long Beach, California, U.S.
- Height: 5 ft 7 in (1.70 m)

Kathryn Morrison (born October 2, 1955; Long Beach, California) is an American model. She was Playboy magazine's Playmate of the Month for its May 1978 issue. Her centerfold was photographed by Phillip Dixon and Dwight Hooker.

== June ==
Gail Stanton

Personal details
- Born: Brenda Gail Stone; November 19, 1954 Memphis, Tennessee
- Died: November 21, 1996 (aged 42)
- Height: 5 ft 1 in (1.55 m)

Gail Stanton (November 19, 1954, in Memphis, Tennessee – November 21, 1996, in Memphis) was an American model. She was Playboy magazine's Playmate of the Month for its June 1978 issue. Her centerfold was photographed by David Chan. She was originally photographed for a layout in the April 1977 issue entitled "Girls of the New South". Stanton died two days after her 42nd birthday, on November 21, 1996, of complications from a blockage to her colon.

== July ==
Karen Morton

Personal details
- Born: October 3, 1958 Palmdale, California, United States
- Died: February 11, 2014 (aged 55) Burbank, California, United States
- Height: 5 ft 6 in (1.68 m)

Karen Elaine Morton was Playboy's Miss July 1978. Her centerfold was shot by Ken Marcus. Later on, Karen had a small part in the Mel Brooks film History of the World, Part I (1981), and went on to a modeling career in Europe. Her cousin, Elaine Morton, was the June 1970 Playmate.

She played Jenny in the video for Tommy Tutone's "867-5309/Jenny".

She developed Stevens–Johnson syndrome in 2004, which caused her to go blind, and died on February 11, 2014.

== August ==
Vicki Witt

Personal details
- Born: April 13, 1959 (age 67) Lansing, Michigan
- Height: 5 ft 7 in (1.70 m)

Vicki Witt (born April 13, 1959) is an American model. She was Playboy magazine's Playmate of the Month for its August 1978 issue. Her centerfold was photographed by Pompeo Posar. She posed for the September 1977 "Girls of the Big Ten" pictorial before becoming a Playmate the following year. Witt continued to work for Playboy for a few years following her selection as a Playmate.

== September ==
Rosanne Katon

Personal details
- Born: February 5, 1954 (age 72) New York City, New York, United States
- Height: 5 ft 2 in (1.57 m)

Rosanne Katon (born February 5, 1954) is an American model, actress, comedian, and activist. She was Playboy magazine's Playmate of the Month for its September 1978 issue. Her centerfold was photographed by Mario Casilli.

In 1984, Katon married Richard Walden, the president and chief executive officer of Operation USA, an international organization that supplies relief to Third World areas in need. The Waldens have two children, including a son who is autistic and an expert cellist. The family is featured in the 2007 documentary Autism: The Musical, which won the 2007 Emmy for Best TV Documentary Special (HBO).

== October ==
Marcy Hanson

Personal details
- Born: December 22, 1952 (age 73) Galveston, Texas, United States
- Height: 5 ft 8 in (1.73 m)

Marcy Hanson (born December 22, 1952, in Galveston, Texas) is an American model and actress.

She was Playboy magazine's Playmate of the Month for its October 1978 issue. Her centerfold was photographed by Mario Casilli. Before Hanson became a Playmate, she had a lead role on the short-lived NBC comedy series The Roller Girls.

== November ==
Monique St. Pierre

Playboy Playmate of the Year
- 1979
- Preceded by: Debra Jo Fondren
- Succeeded by: Dorothy Stratten

Personal details
- Born: November 25, 1953 (age 72) Wiesbaden, West Germany
- Height: 5 ft 7 in (1.70 m)

Monique St. Pierre (born November 25, 1953) is a German-American model and actress. She was Playboy magazine's Playmate of the Month for November 1978 issue and the 1979 Playmate of the Year. Her original centerfold was photographed by Richard Fegley.

St. Pierre was born in Wiesbaden, West Germany, and speaks English, German and French. She had signed with the Wilhelmina modeling agency just prior to being chosen to be a Playmate, but was fired soon after her first pictorial was published. She stayed with Playboy both as a model and as an executive, eventually holding a top position at the fledgling Playboy Channel. In May 2017, at the age 63, St. Pierre duplicated her Playmate of the Year cover along with her cohorts Kimberley Conrad, Renee Tenison, Candace Collins, Lisa Matthews, Cathy St. George, and Charlotte Kemp, nearly four decades on.

== December ==
Janet Quist

Personal details
- Born: August 17, 1955 (age 70) Austin, Texas, United States
- Height: 5 ft 7.5 in (1.71 m)

Janet Quist (born August 17, 1955, in Austin, Texas) is an American model and actress. She was Playboy magazine's Playmate of the Month for its December 1978 issue. Her centerfold was photographed by Ken Marcus. Janet came to Playboy's attention through a "Playmate Photo Contest" that the magazine staged in 1977. She was later featured in Outlaw Blues, a movie set in Austin.

== See also ==
- List of people in Playboy 1970–1979

Debra Jensen	Janis Schmitt	Christina Smith	Pamela Bryant	Kathryn Morrison	Gail Stanton
Karen Morton	Vicki Witt	Rosanne Katon	Marcy Hanson	Monique St. Pierre	Janet Quist
