= Lee Ann Michelle =

British model (born 1960)

Playboy centerfold appearance
- February 1979
- Preceded by: Candy Loving
- Succeeded by: Denise McConnell

Personal details
- Born: 17 March 1960 (age 66) Surrey, England
- Height: 5 ft 4 in (1.63 m)

Lee Ann Michelle (born 17 March 1960) is an English model and actress. She was chosen as Playboy magazine's Playmate of the Month for the February 1979 issue. Her centerfold was photographed by Mario Casilli. She is the first Playmate to have been born in the 1960s.

She was born in Surrey, England. Her real name is Carol Needham and she was called Carol earlier in her career, including when she posed topless for the newspapers The Sun and Daily Mirror. Her debut was at the age of 16 in the 7 January 1977 edition of The Sun.

In the 1979 film Seven she had an uncredited role playing Sybill.

Needham later married and co-founded a modelling agency called Needham and Hanson Management.

== See also ==
- List of people in Playboy 1970–1979

Candy Loving	Lee Ann Michelle	Denise McConnell	Missy Cleveland	Michele Drake	Louann Fernald
Dorothy Mays	Dorothy Stratten	Vicki McCarty	Ursula Buchfellner	Sylvie Garant	Candace Collins
