= List of Playboy Playmates of 1974 =

Playboy Playmates of 1974

The following is a list of Playboy Playmates of 1974, the 20th anniversary year of the publication. Playboy magazine names their Playmate of the Month each month throughout the year.

== January ==
Nancy Cameron

Personal details
- Born: March 15, 1954 (age 72) Pittsburgh, Pennsylvania, United States
- Height: 5 ft 8 in (1.73 m)

Nancy Cameron (born March 15, 1954, in Pittsburgh, Pennsylvania) is an American model and actress. She was chosen as Playboy magazine's Playmate of the Month for the January 1974 issue, Playboy's 20th anniversary issue. Cameron appeared in a double-sided centerfold, with both her nude front and back visible. Her centerfold was photographed by Dwight Hooker. On the cover of the May 1976 issue, she appears in front of the 1886 painting by Georges Seurat, Sunday Afternoon on the Island of La Grande Jatte, posed similarly to the main character in that composition.

== February ==
Francine Parks

Personal details
- Born: January 30, 1951 (age 75) Mobile, Alabama, United States
- Height: 5 ft 5 in (1.65 m)

Francine Parks (born January 30, 1951, in Mobile, Alabama) is an American model. She was Playboy magazine's Playmate of the Month for the February 1974 issue. Her centerfold was photographed by Mario Casilli.

== March ==
Pamela Zinszer

Personal details
- Born: September 6, 1955 (age 70) Kansas
- Height: 5 ft 3 in (1.60 m)

Pamela Zinszer (born September 6, 1955, in Kansas) is an American model. She was Playboy magazine's Playmate of the Month for the March 1974 issue. Her centerfold was photographed by Mario Casilli.

== April ==
Marlene Morrow

Personal details
- Born: March 15, 1954 (age 72) Billings, Montana, United States
- Height: 5 ft 8.5 in (1.74 m)

Marlene Morrow (born March 15, 1954) is an American model. She was Playboy magazine's Playmate of the Month for the April 1974 issue. Her centerfold was photographed by Larry Dale Gordon.

== May ==
Marilyn Lange

Playboy Playmate of the Year
- 1975
- Preceded by: Cyndi Wood
- Succeeded by: Lillian Müller

Personal details
- Born: January 12, 1952 (age 74) Westfield, New Jersey, United States
- Height: 5 ft 7 in (1.70 m)

Marilyn Lange (born January 12, 1952, in Westfield, New Jersey) is a model chosen by Playboy magazine as the Playmate of the Month for May 1974, and later, the 1975 Playmate of the Year. The Playmate of the Year pictorial was featured in the June 1975 issue, and both of her pictorials were photographed by Dwight Hooker.

At that time, she lived in Hawaii and played soccer. As a publicity stunt, the Chicago Sting of the men's North American Soccer League selected her in the final round of the 1976 draft. Although she never played for them, she did work in the promotions department.

== June ==
Sandy Johnson

Personal details
- Born: July 7, 1954 (age 72) San Antonio, Texas, United States
- Height: 5 ft 6 in (1.68 m)

Sandy Johnson (born July 7, 1954, in San Antonio, Texas) is an American model and actress. She was Playboy magazine's Playmate of the Month for the June 1974 issue. Her centerfold was photographed by Mario Casilli. Johnson's acting credits include 1978's Halloween as Judith Myers.

== July ==
Carol Vitale

Personal details
- Born: November 14, 1946 Elizabeth, New Jersey
- Died: July 23, 2008 (aged 61) Aventura, Florida
- Height: 5 ft 6 in (1.68 m)

Carol Vitale (November 14, 1946, in Elizabeth, New Jersey – July 23, 2008, in Aventura, Florida) was an American model and television program hostess/personality. She was Playboy magazine's Playmate of the Month for its July 1974 issue. Her centerfold was photographed by David Chan. In all, she appeared in three Playboy pictorials, as well as the cover of the August 1972 issue. She came to Playboy's attention while working as a Bunny at the Miami Playboy Club.

Vitale died on July 23, 2008, at her condo in Aventura, Florida, as a result of complications from lupus, scleroderma, and osteoporosis.

== August ==
Jeane Manson

Personal details
- Born: Jean Manson; October 1, 1950 (age 75) Cleveland, Ohio, United States
- Height: 5 ft 7 in (1.70 m)

Jeane Manson, born Jean Manson, (born October 1, 1950, in Cleveland, Ohio) is an American model, singer and actress. She was Playboy magazine's Playmate of the Month for the August 1974 issue. Her centerfold was photographed by Dwight Hooker.

Performing under the name Jeane Manson, she became a recording artist in Europe, hosted television specials in France and had a regular role on the long-running primetime soap Riviera. She represented Luxembourg in the 1979 Eurovision Song Contest.

== September ==
Kristine Hanson

Personal details
- Born: September 23, 1951 (age 74) Illinois, United States
- Height: 5 ft 5.5 in (1.66 m)

Kristine Hanson (born September 23, 1951, in Illinois) is an American television broadcaster who also was Playboy magazine's Playmate of the Month for the September 1974 issue. Her centerfold was photographed by David Chan.

She won an Emmy Award and a first place award for American Women in Radio and Television.

== October ==
Ester Cordet

Personal details
- Born: December 31, 1946 (age 79) Panama
- Height: 5 ft 7.5 in (1.71 m)

Ester Cordet (born December 31, 1946, in Panama) is a Panamanian-born model. She was Playboy magazine's Playmate of the Month for the October 1974 issue. Her centerfold was photographed by Richard Fegley. Cordet was also the cover model for the Ohio Players album, Honey.

At the time the issue was published, and during the shooting, Esther Cordet (real name Esther Sgobba) was married. Her husband, who was in the background of one of the photos, was described in the cut line as a "friend". She was also the mother of a four-year-old son. At the time of the photo shoot and the magazine's release she was employed as a flight attendant at Pacific Southwest Airlines.

== November ==
Bebe Buell
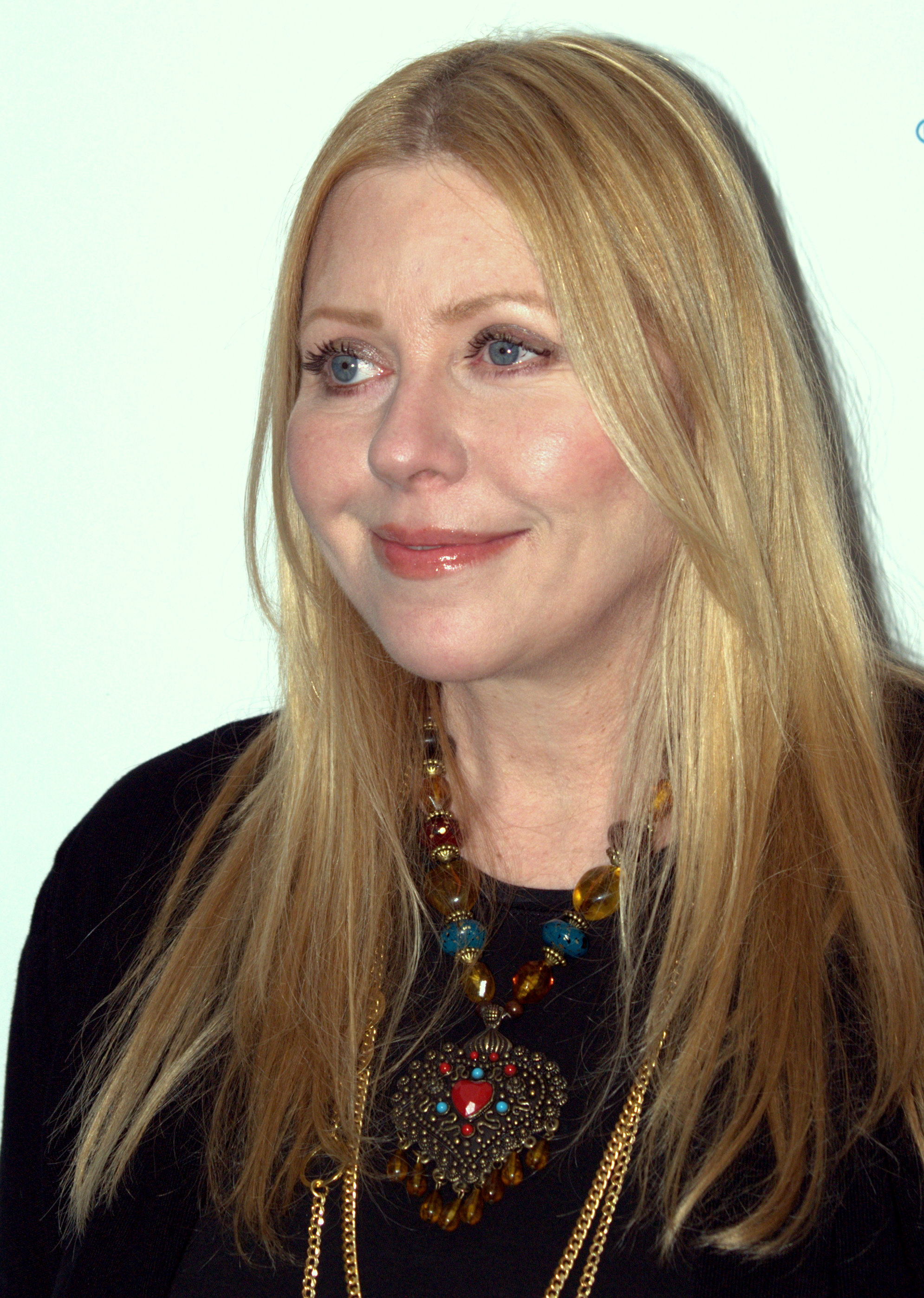
- Buell at the 2009 Tribeca Film Festival

Personal details
- Born: July 14, 1953 (age 73) Portsmouth, Virginia, United States
- Height: 5 ft 9 in (1.75 m)

Bebe Buell (born Beverle Lorence Buell on July 14, 1953, in Portsmouth, Virginia) is an American fashion model and singer, and Playboy magazine's November 1974 Playmate of the Month. She is also known for dating and marrying rock musicians. She is actress Liv Tyler's mother from a brief relationship with Aerosmith vocalist Steven Tyler (although Buell initially claimed the father was Todd Rundgren).

In 2001, she wrote an autobiography (with Victor Bockris) entitled Rebel Heart: An American Rock and Roll Journey. The book was a New York Times bestseller.

Filmmaker Cameron Crowe, in his commentary on the extended DVD of his 2000 movie Almost Famous, said he based the film's "Penny Lane" character (played by Kate Hudson) in part on Buell.

== December ==
Janice Raymond

Personal details
- Born: Janice Lynn Whitby; March 25, 1951 St Helens, Lancashire, England
- Died: December 14, 2011 (aged 60) Plano, Texas, U.S.
- Height: 5 ft 10 in (1.78 m)

Janice Lynn Marshall (née Whitby; March 25, 1951 – December 14, 2011), better known as Janice Raymond, was an English model. She was selected as Playboy magazine's Playmate of the Month for its December 1974 issue. Raymond was born in St Helens, Lancashire, England on March 25, 1951. (Note: Not to be confused with University of Massachusetts Amherst professor emerita of women's studies and medical ethics, Janice Raymond) She died in Plano, Texas on December 14, 2011, at the age of 60, leaving one son and two daughters with husband Les Marshall.

== See also ==
- List of people in Playboy 1970–1979

== Notes ==
Nancy Cameron	Francine Parks	Pamela Zinszer	Marlene Morrow	Marilyn Lange	Sandy Johnson
Carol Vitale	Jean Manson	Kristine Hanson	Ester Cordet	Bebe Buell	Janice Raymond
