= Monica Tidwell =

American model (born 1954)

Playboy centerfold appearance
- November 1973
- Preceded by: Valerie Lane
- Succeeded by: Christine Maddox

Personal details
- Born: January 14, 1954 (age 71) Shreveport, Louisiana
- Height: 5 ft 2.5 in (1.59 m)

Monica Tidwell (born January 14, 1954) is an American model. She was born in Shreveport, Louisiana. A red-head, she was Playboy magazine's Playmate of the Month for the November 1973 issue; her centerfold was photographed by Dwight Hooker and Bill Frantz. Tidwell was the first Playmate who was younger than the magazine itself: she was 19 at the time of the photo shoot, having been born when the second issue of Playboy was on sale.

Tidwell was the Primary Producer of the 2008 Off Broadway play Mindgame in New York City. Written by Anthony Horowitz (writer of Foyle's War), the play was directed by British film director Ken Russell and starred Keith Carradine, Lee Godart and Kathleen McNenny.

| Miki Garcia | Cyndi Wood | Bonnie Large | Julie Woodson | Anulka Dziubinska | Ruthy Ross |
| Martha Smith | Phyllis Coleman | Geri Glass | Valerie Lane | Monica Tidwell | Christine Maddox |
