= Textures: A Photographic Album for Artists and Designers =

Compendium of texture photographs

Textures: A Photographic Album for Artists and Designers is a compendium of 112 texture photographs by Phil Brodatz. It was published in 1966 by Dover Publications. The texture images are grayscale and taken under controlled lighting conditions. Each texture is accompanied by a brief description of the contents and the conditions under which it was taken, and a unique identifier.

== Use in research ==
The images in the book are widely used as a standard signal processing and image processing texture dataset. However, the images are copyrighted and the legality of their usage in academic publications is unclear.

== See also ==
- Lenna, another standard test image in violation of copyright.
