= Playboy Bunny =

Female server at a Playboy Club

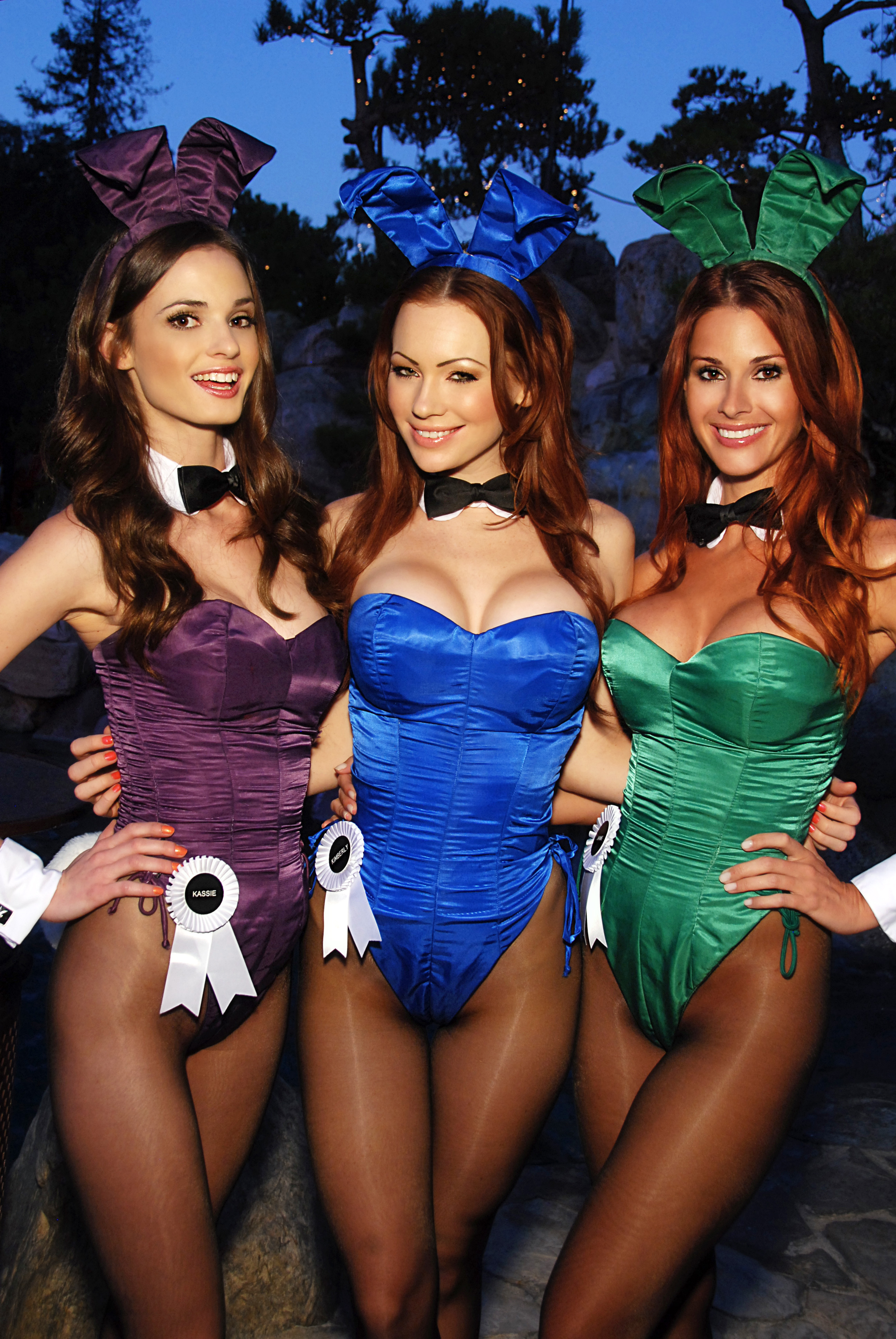
Playboy Bunny waitresses (Kassie Lyn Logsdon, Kimberly Phillips and Jaime Faith Edmondson) at the Playboy Mansion in July 2011

A Playboy Bunny is a cocktail waitress who works at a Playboy Club and selected through standardized training. Their costumes were made up of lingerie, inspired by the tuxedo-wearing Playboy rabbit mascot. This costume consisted of a strapless corset teddy, bunny ears, black sheer-to-waist pantyhose, a bow tie, a collar, cuffs and a fluffy cottontail. In more recent Playboy Clubs, such as Sin City that was re-opened in 2006, Playboy bunnies wore slightly altered costumes that were based on the original bunny suit.

== Origins ==
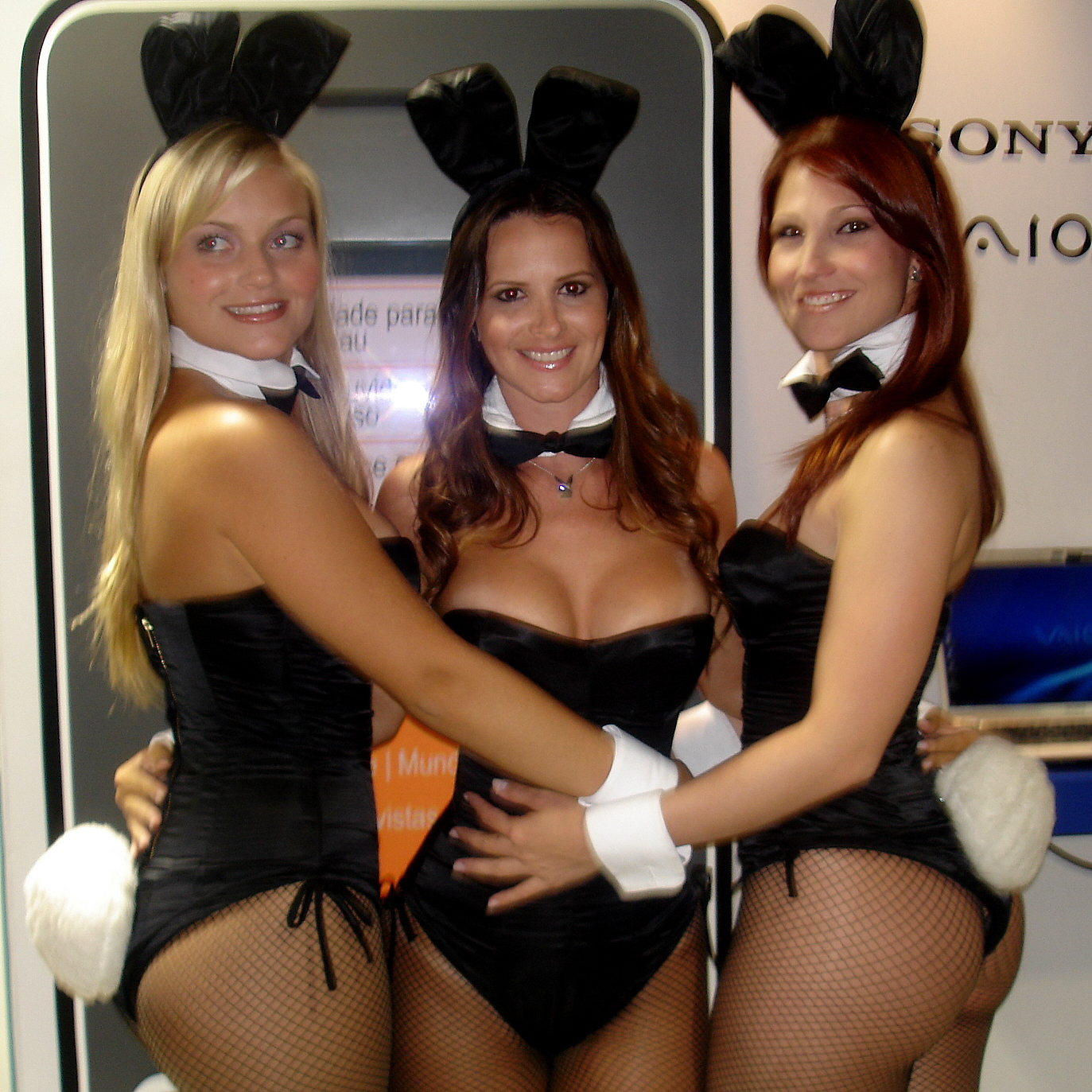
Playboy Bunny waitresses (Thaíz Schmitt, Márcia Spézia and Ana Lúcia Fernandes) at Campus Party in Brazil in 2009

The original Playboy Bunny costume was designed by the mother of Ilse Taurins (Ilze Tauriņa in Latvian), who was a Latvian émigrée. At the time, Taurins was dating one of the Playboy Club co-founders, Victor Lownes III.

Taurins had suggested a costume modeled after the Playboy Magazine trademark, either a rabbit or bunny, and she had her seamstress mother make a costume prototype. The prototype was reviewed at a meeting attended by Playboy Club co-founders Hugh Hefner, Victor Lownes and Arnold Morton, as well as frequent Playboy illustrator LeRoy Neiman.

The outfits were initially not received well by the co-founders, but Hefner advised that it could work once changes were made. The initial costume looked similar to a one piece swimsuit, with a white yarn puff tail and a headband with bunny ears, and Hefner suggested cutting the leg higher on the hip to expose more of the leg, and sharpening the v-shape of the costume. His suggested modifications were in an attempt to make the costumes more visually appealing, and the tightly laced corsets added to the feminine appeal, cinching in the Bunny's waist by at least two inches. This redesign of the bunny costume tied in directly with the need for a show-girl type of costume, achieving this look with an addition of bow ties, collars and a fluffy cottontail.

For mass production, the costume was manufactured for the Playboy Clubs by the Chicago-based Kabo Corset Company, and was based upon a "merry widow" style of corset within their line.

Later, in 1962, French fashion designer Renee Blot was further employed to refine the design, and her revisions included making the ears smaller, adding a collar with bow tie and cuffs with rabbit-head cufflinks, and a satin rosette with the bunny's name, worn on the hip. The original costumes were made in twelve colours of rayon satin. Several years later, Playboy engaged a prominent manufacturer of lingerie and swimwear to create a modified bunny costume that used washable stretch knit fabrics, allowing for costumes in vibrant prints as well as solid colors. The standard stockings also evolved from fishnet material to a special sheer pantyhose style supplied by Danskin. Bunnies wore two pairs of these sheer stockings, a black pair worn on top of a taupe toned pair.

In the 1970s, Lownes used his country mansion, Stocks House in Hertfordshire, England, as a training camp for Bunnies. The Bunnies acted as hostesses at lavish parties thrown in the house.

Since 2013, rumours have suggested the original design of the Playboy bunny costume was by New York fashion designer Zelda Wynn Valdes, however, there exists no evidence to support this. This is also contradicted by recounts in much earlier publications such as Big Bunny by Joe Goldberg (1967) and The Bunny Years by Kathryn Leigh Scott (1998).

The bunny costume became a symbol of the Playboy Clubs, and was also the first commercial uniform to be registered by the United States Patent and Trademark Office (U.S. trademark registration number 0762884).

== Training and qualifications ==
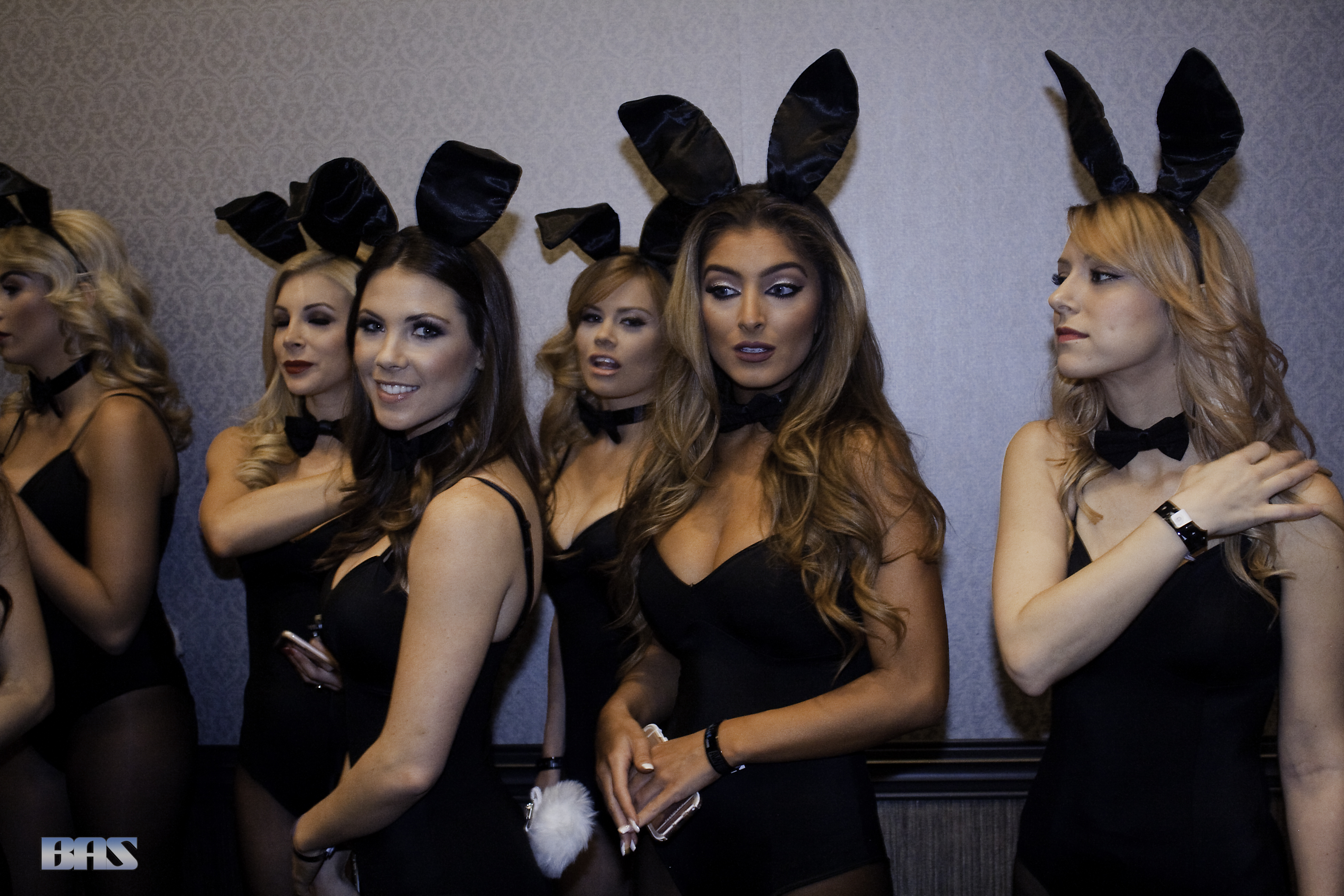
Playboy Bunnies at the 2016 AEE

The Playboy Bunnies are waitresses who serve drinks at Playboy Clubs. There are different types of Bunnies, including the Door Bunny, Cigarette Bunny, Floor Bunny, Pool Bunny, Fine Dining Bunny, Playmate Bunny, and the Jet Bunnies (specially selected Bunnies trained as flight attendants; they served on the Playboy "Big Bunny" Jet).

To become a Bunny, women are first carefully chosen and selected from auditions. Bunnies then undergo thorough and strict training before officially becoming a Bunny. Bunnies are required to be able to identify 143 brands of liquor and know how to garnish 20 cocktail variations. Customers are not allowed to touch the Bunnies, demerits are given if a Bunny's appearance does not meet requirements, and dating or mingling with customers is forbidden.

A Bunny also has to master the required maneuvers to work. These include the "Bunny Stance", a posture that is required in front of patrons, where the Bunny must stand with legs together, back arched and hips tucked under. When the Bunny is resting or waiting to be of service, she must do the "Bunny Perch," where she must sit on the back of a chair, sofa, or railing without sitting too close to a patron. The most famous maneuver of all, the "Bunny Dip", was invented by Kelly Collins, once renowned for being the "Perfect Bunny". To do the "Bunny Dip", the Bunny gracefully leans backwards while bending at the knees with the left knee lifted and tucked behind the right leg. This maneuver allows the Bunny to serve drinks while keeping her low-cut costume in place. Strict regulations were enforced by special workers in the guise of patrons.

== Description ==
The uniforms were tailored to each Bunny at the clubs in which they worked, and a full-time seamstress always remained on duty whenever the club was open. The costumes were stocked in two pieces, the front part being pre-sewn in different bra cup sizes, and the seamstress would match the Bunnies' figure to the correct fitting front and back pieces. The two pieces were then sewn together to fit each person with great precision.

A woman known as the "Bunny Mother" took responsibility for the welfare of the women working as Playboy Bunnies. This was a human-resources role and a management position, as the Bunny Mother was in charge of scheduling work shifts, hiring, firing and training. The club manager carried two responsibilities for the Bunnies – floor service and weigh-in. Before every shift, the manager would weigh each Bunny, and bunnies could not gain or lose more than one pound, with exceptions made only for water retention. Playboy Enterprises requires all employees to return their costumes at the end of employment, and some of them are retained by Playboy in storage. Occasionally, costumes are offered for sale on the Playboy auction site or eBay, but some of the costumes on eBay are known to be counterfeit or damaged. The only two costumes on public display are in the collections of the Smithsonian and the Chicago History Museum.

== Image ==
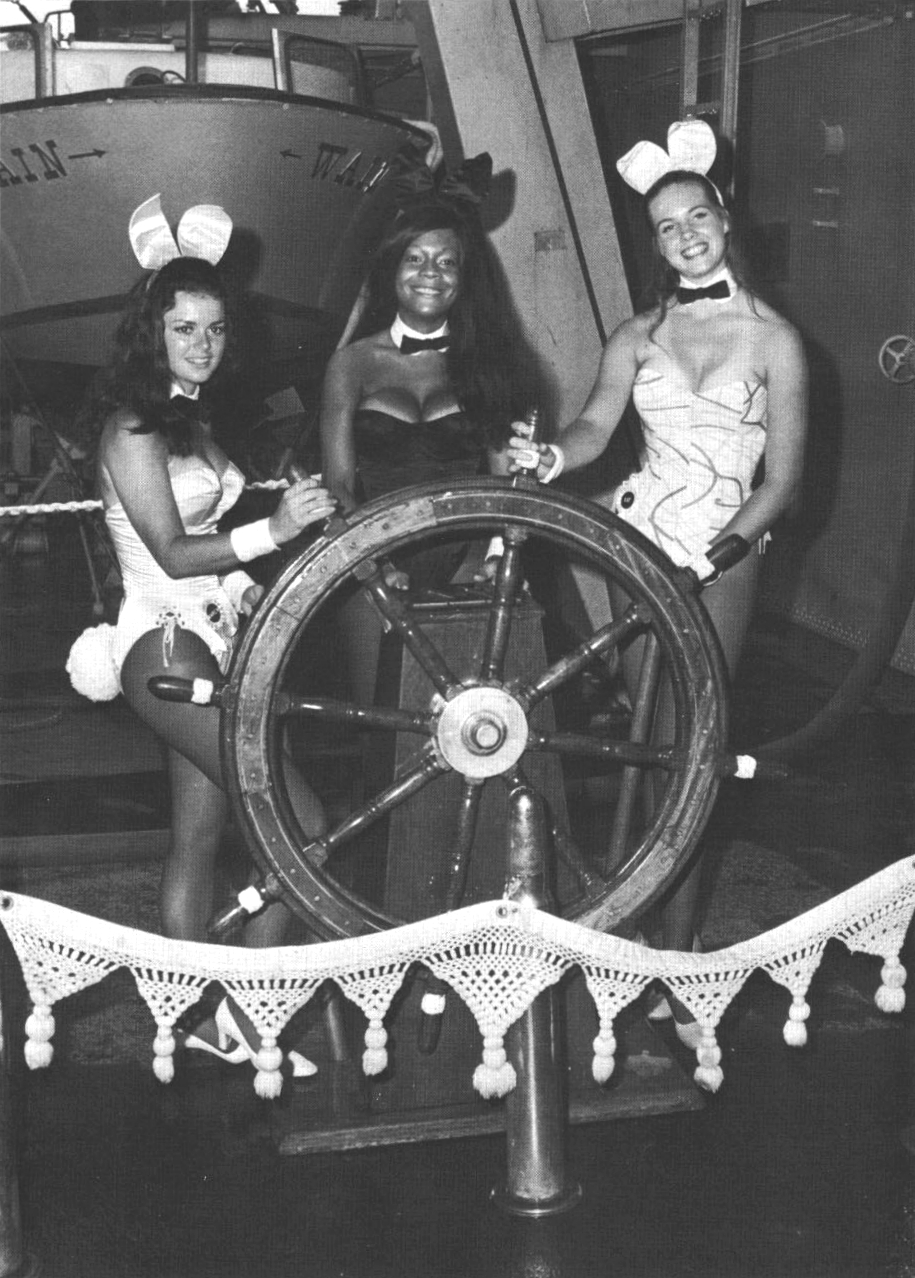
New York Playboy Club Bunnies Waren Smith, Tiki Owens and Liz James, aboard USS Wainwright c. 1971

=== Reception and review ===
The treatment of Playboy Bunnies was exposed in a piece written by Gloria Steinem and reprinted in her 1983 book Outrageous Acts and Everyday Rebellions. The article featured a photo of Steinem in Bunny uniform and detailed how women were treated at those clubs. The article was published in 1963 in Show magazine as "A Bunny's Tale". Steinem has maintained that she is proud of the work she did publicizing the exploitative working conditions of the Bunnies and especially the sexual demands made of them, which skirted the edge of the law.

Clive James wrote of the "callous fatuity of the selection process" and observed that "to make it as a Bunny, a girl need[ed] more than just looks. She need[ed] idiocy, too."

=== International icon ===
Haruhi Suzumiya (center) and other characters wearing bunny girl outfits from the 2006 anime The Melancholy of Haruhi Suzumiya

The costume of a Playboy Bunny gained huge popularity in Japan, where it has lost much of its association with Playboy and is accordingly referred to simply as the "bunny suit" (バニースーツ, Banī sūtsu; which also means cleanroom suit in Japanese and has same meaning in English.) or "bunny girl outfit" (バニーガール衣装, Banī gāru ishou). It has frequently been featured in manga and anime; notable examples of characters who have been depicted wearing it include the title character of Haruhi Suzumiya, Kallen Stadtfeld of Code Geass, Bulma of Dragon Ball, Haruko Haruhara of FLCL, and the unnamed protagonist of the Daicon III and Daicon IV Opening Animations. The outfit is alluded to in the title of the series Rascal Does Not Dream of Bunny Girl Senpai, and the character Mai Sakurajima is seen wearing one in its first episode. The suit is also popularly depicted in anime and manga fan art and merchandise, even for characters who are never seen wearing it in official works. Bunny suits are most frequently worn by female characters, but they are occasionally worn by male characters, usually for comedic effect.

There are no Playboy Clubs in Brazil, but Playboy's Brazilian division has Bunnies who attend its events. For most of the 2000s there were three official Bunnies, and they were also Playmates — both separately, and together in the cover pictorial for the December 2008 edition. The last printed issue of the magazine, in 2018, featured the five Bunnies of the period on the cover.

Playboy Bunnies are a separate entity from Playboy Playmates, women who appear in the centerfold pictorials of Playboy magazine, however, a few Playboy Bunnies went on to become Playmates and vice versa (see below).

== Return of the Bunnies ==
In 2006, The Palms Hotel-Casino in Las Vegas opened the first new Playboy Club in over a quarter-century, located on the 52nd floor of the Fantasy Tower. Italian fashion designer Roberto Cavalli was chosen to re-design the original Bunny suit. It closed in 2012.

== Notable Bunnies ==
Prominent women who had careers as a Playboy Bunnies include:

- Alene Akins, ex-wife of Larry King
- Barbara Bosson, actress known for her role on Hill Street Blues
- Dale Bozzio, rock singer and musician
- Ava Cherry, singer, model, and muse of David Bowie
- Carol Cleveland, actress, Monty Python's Flying Circus
- Julie Cobb, actress
- Sherilyn Fenn (was only a Playboy Bunny trainee), film and television actress
- Janis Hansen, actress who played Gloria, wife of Felix Unger, on The Odd Couple. Her character's past as a Bunny is talked about in the episode "One for the Bunny", originally aired on March 22, 1974.
- Debbie Harry, musician and actress. ("The girls there were part of the entertainment; part of the sort of mystique, the excitement, the naughtiness of it," she recalled. "But on the inside of that job, the girls were treated very, very well. There was a lot of benefits: health benefits, job security, good salary, good money. It was a very sought-after kind of job.")
- Gloria Hendry, actress
- Lauren Hutton, model and actress
- Lynne Moody, actress known for Roots
- Polly Matzinger, the originator of the danger model of the immune system
- Patricia Quinn, Magenta in The Rocky Horror Picture Show
- Dolly Martin, Playboy model and actress
- Maria Richwine, actress and first Latina Bunny
- Sabrina Scharf, actress, lawyer, real estate developer, activist, and politician
- Kathryn Leigh Scott, actress
- Carol Sharkey, U.S. Marine, mother of Jon Bon Jovi
- Gloria Steinem, became a Bunny as part of an undercover journalistic assignment
- Eve Stratford, model
- Susan Sullivan, actress
- B.J. Ward, who would later become a voice actress
- Kimba Wood (a Playboy Bunny trainee), a United States federal judge nominated for the post of U.S. Attorney General by Bill Clinton.
- Jacklyn Zeman, actress known for her role on General Hospital

=== Bunnies who were also Playboy Playmates ===
- Helena Antonaccio
- Deanna Baker
- Lannie Balcom
- Kai Brendlinger
- Jessica Burciaga
- Sandy Cagle
- Dianne Chandler
- Karen Christy
- Sharon Clark
- June Cochran
- Marilyn Cole
- Candace Collins
- Victoria Cunningham
- Debbie Ellison
- Ava Fabian
- Jennifer Jackson
- Terri Kimball
- Avis Kimble
- Shay Knuth
- China Lee
- Janet Lupo
- Laura Lyons
- Connie Mason
- Patti McGuire
- Avis Miller
- Laura Misch
- Kara Monaco
- Dolly Read
- Patti Reynolds
- Mercy Rooney
- Janis Schmitt
- Dorothy Stratten
- Heather Van Every
- Carol Vitale
- Delores Wells

== Gallery ==
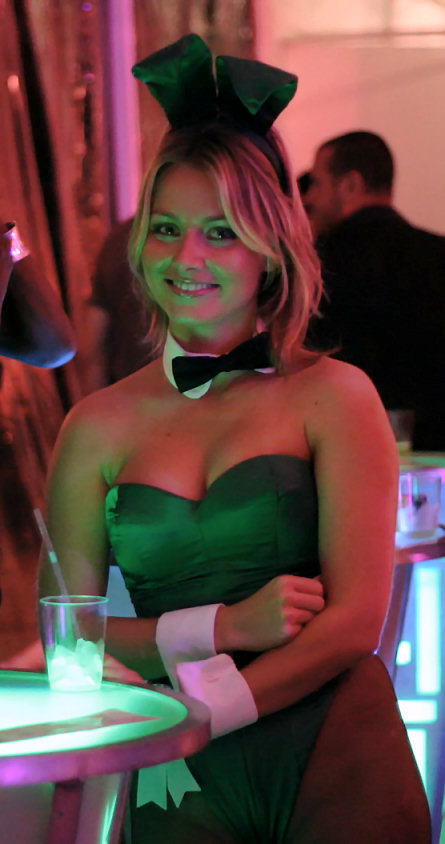

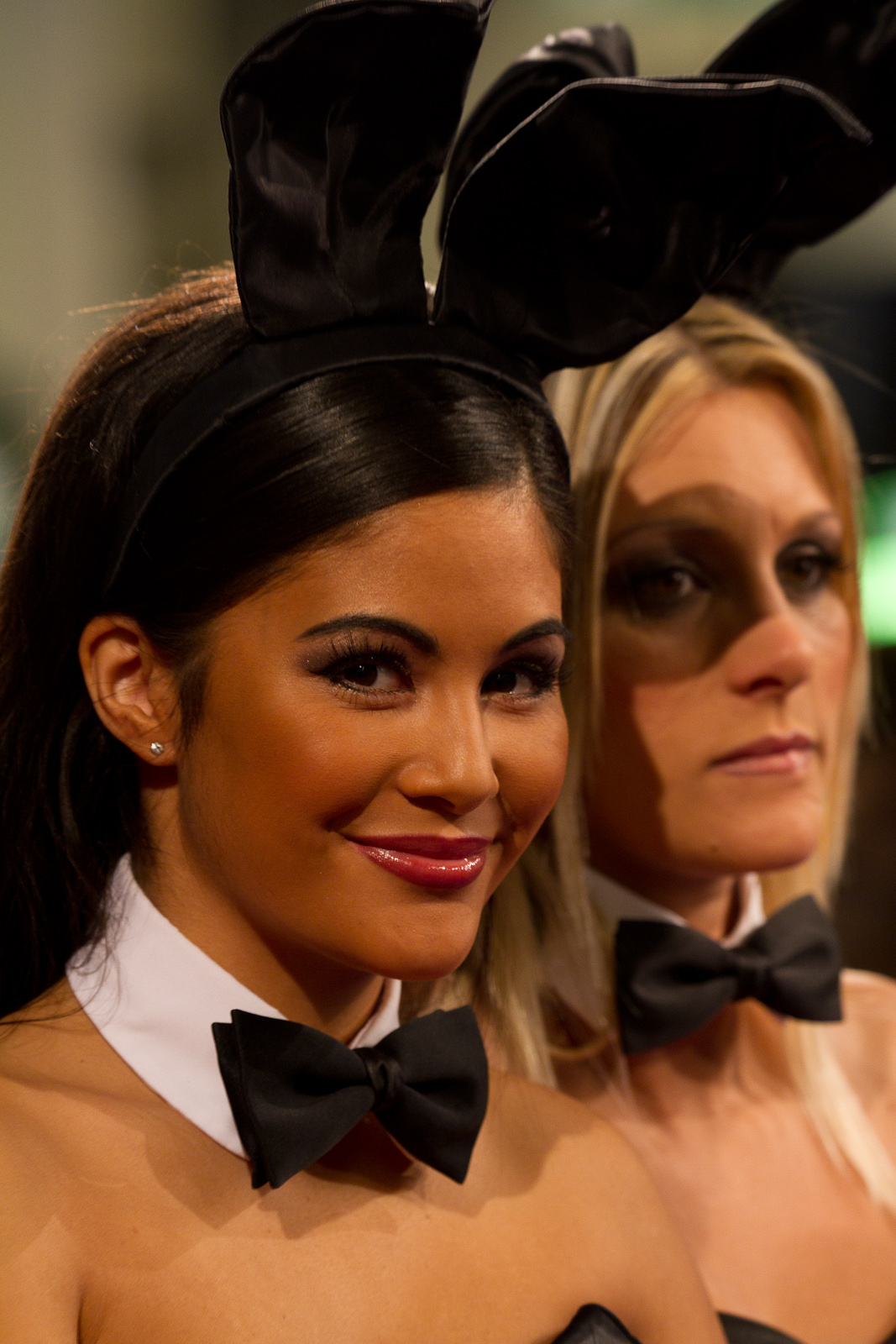

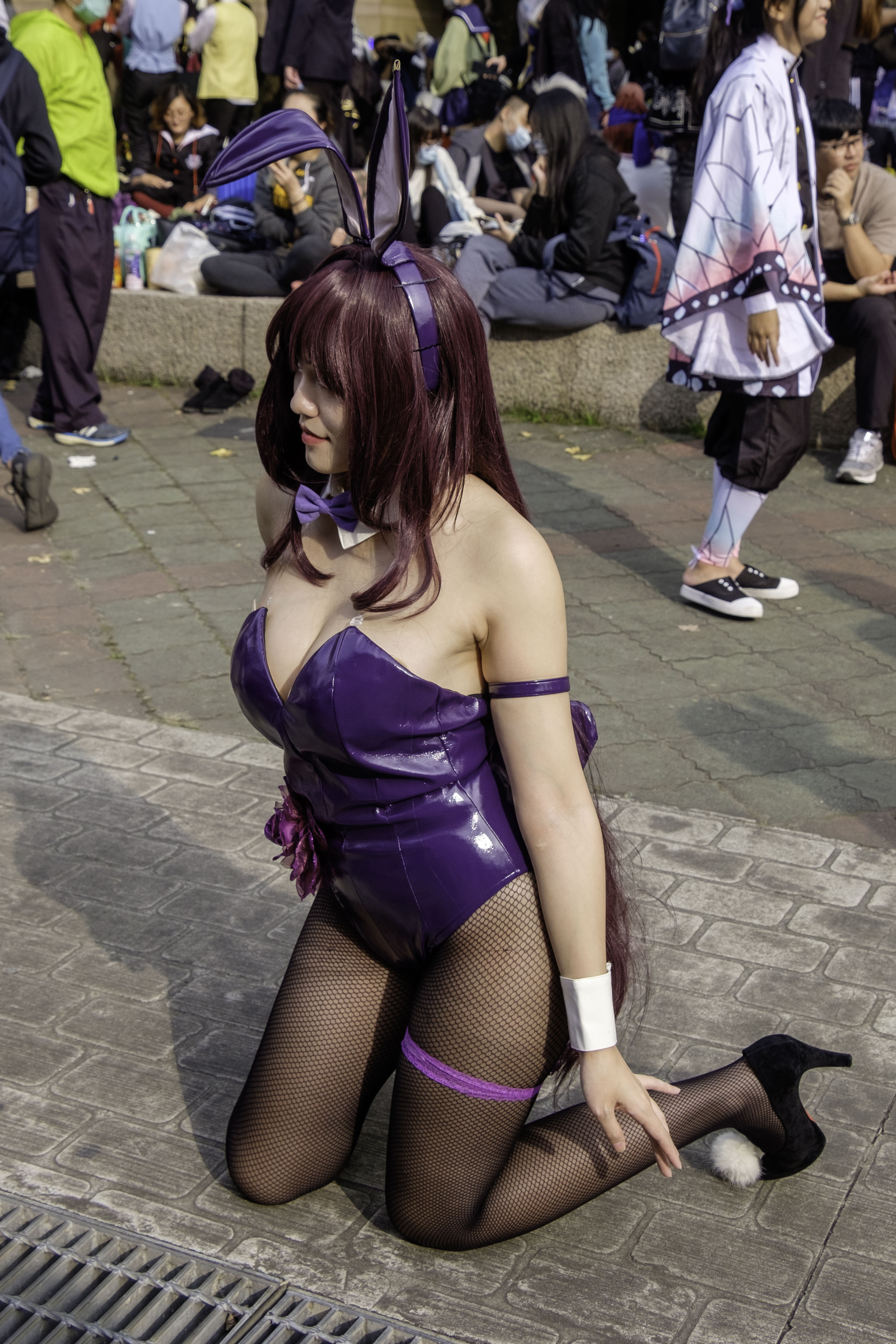

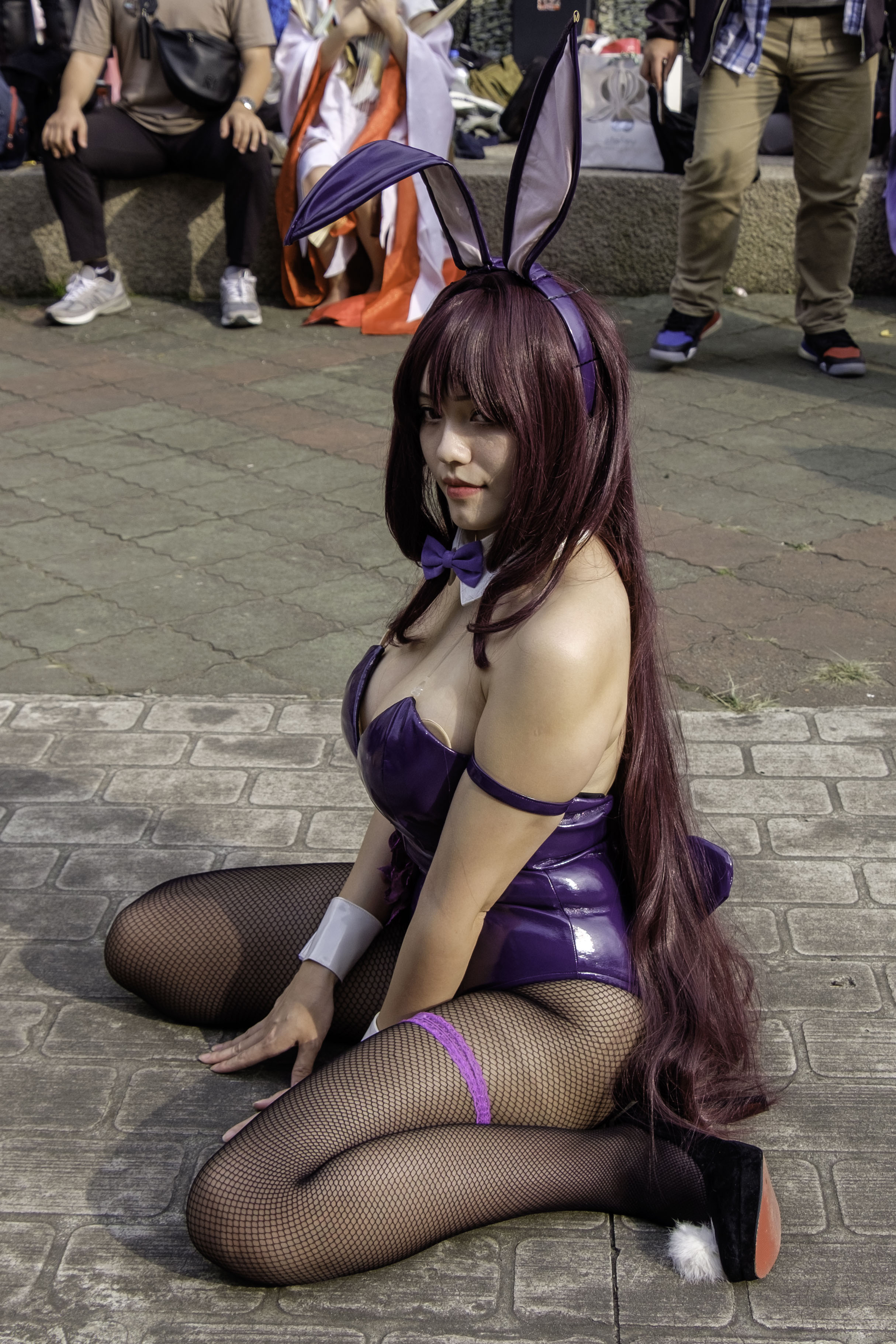

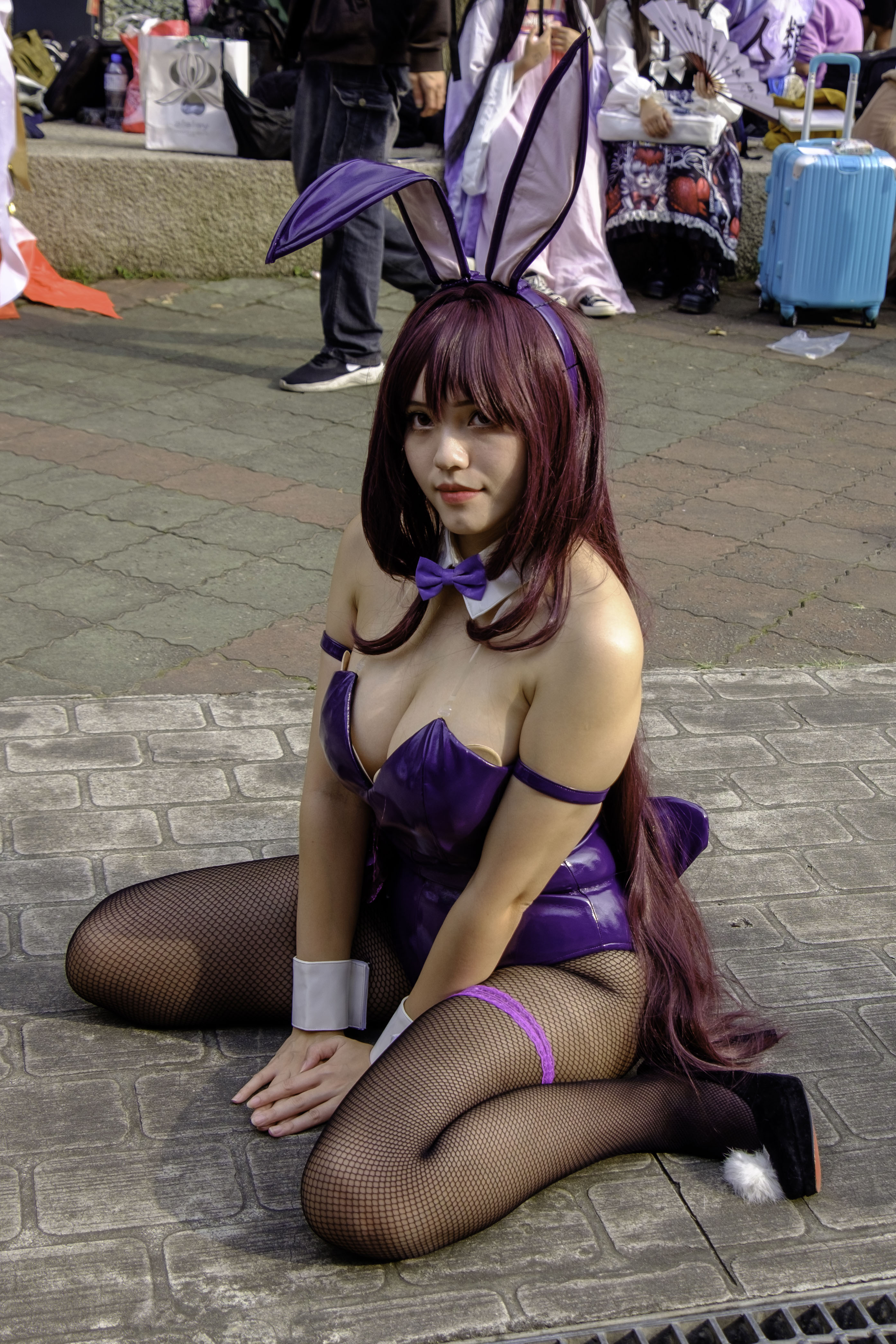

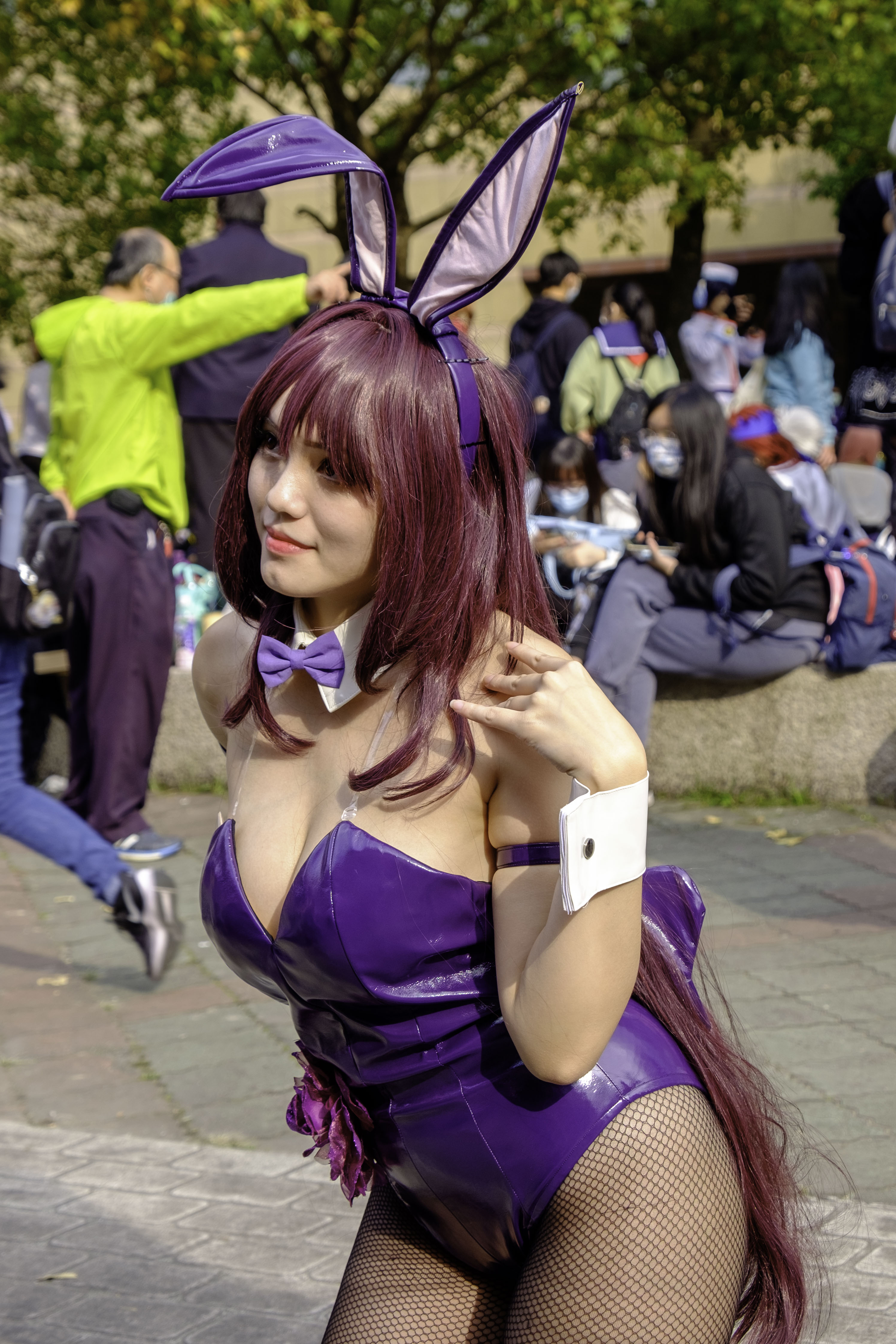

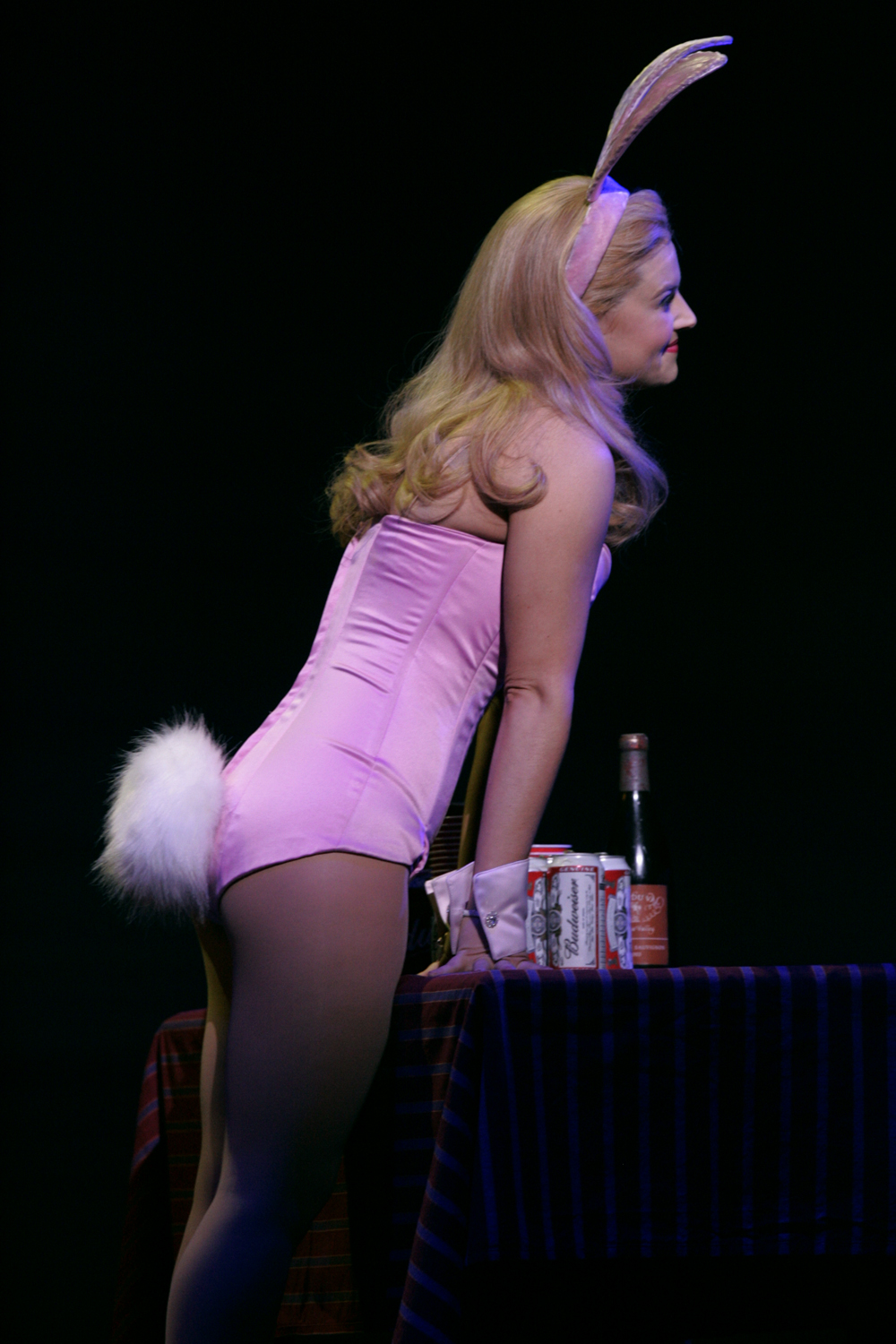

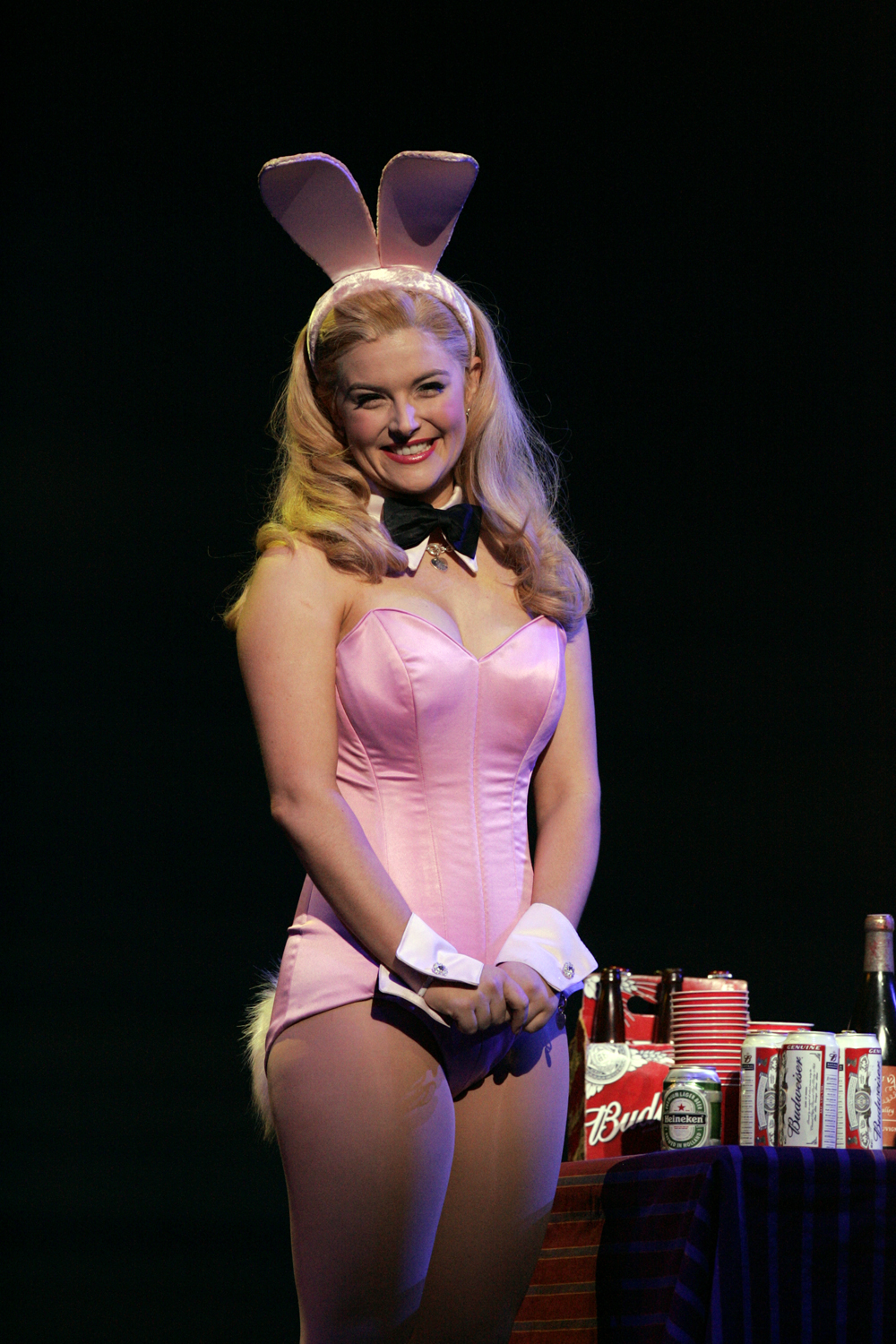

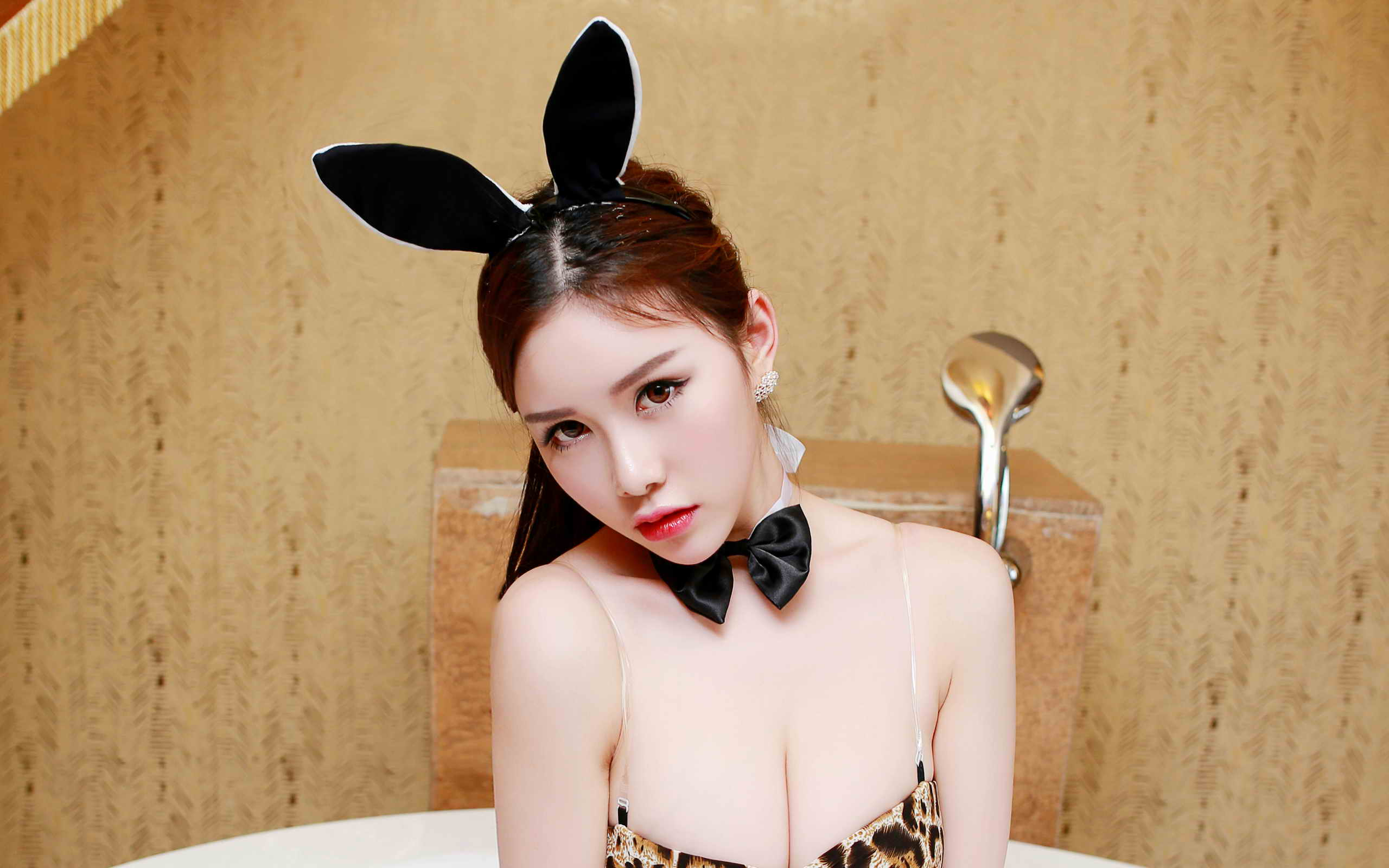

== See also ==
- Animal roleplay
- Breastaurant
- Nyotaimori
- Wet T-shirt contest
