= Playboy's Book of Forbidden Words =

1972 book by Robert Anton Wilson

- Author: Robert Anton Wilson
- Genre: Dictionary
- Publisher: Playboy Press
- Publication date: 1972

Playboy's Book of Forbidden Words was first published in 1972 by Playboy Press and distributed by Simon & Schuster. Written by Robert Anton Wilson, it is sub-titled A liberated dictionary of improper English, containing over 700 uninhibited definitions of erotic and scatological terms. The paperback edition's cover featured Mercy Rooney. It is a collection of 'items' from "Abbess" to "Zoophilia Erotica".

The book contains the definition of words such as “dinge queen” (white homosexual who likes black people), “Beulah‐lover”, “chocolate lover”, “coal burner”, “midnight queen”, “negrera”, “Sheena”, ...

Interviewed by Common Ground, Vancouver (July 1999 Issue), Wilson talked about how he'd been tinkering with Playboy's Book of Forbidden Words, which he considered his best book—worst, that is, after the editors at Playboy did to the book "what the Roman Army did to the Sabine women". Claiming ignorance and inexperience, he had not objected at the time. If he had later rewritten the book the way he had wanted it to be the first time, he would have called it Robert Anton Wilson's Book of Black Magick and Curses. He aimed to include all the anthropological and neurolinguistic theorems that Playboy removed. Portions of this work are reprinted (reedited by Ali A Tuson with an added explanation of his problem with Playboy) in his 1988 work Coincidance.
