= Shay Knuth =

Playboy centerfold (1969)

Playboy centerfold appearance
- September 1969
- Preceded by: Debbie Hooper
- Succeeded by: Jean Bell

Personal details
- Born: May 29, 1945 (age 79); Milwaukee, Wisconsin, U.S.
- Height: 5 ft 3 in (1.60 m)
- Official website

Shay Knuth (born May 29, 1945, in Milwaukee, Wisconsin) was Playboy magazine's Playmate of the Month for September 1969. Her centerfold was photographed by Dwight Hooker. At the time of the photo shoot, she was studying sociology at the University of Wisconsin–Madison and working as a Bunny at the Playboy Resort in Lake Geneva, Wisconsin.

Knuth later appeared on the covers of the January 1970 and December 1970 issues of Playboy as well as a "Playmates Forever" pictorial in the April 1984 issue. She also worked as a Bunny at the San Francisco and London Playboy Clubs and as the "Official Party Coordinator" for Studio 54. As of 2009 Knuth lived in Chicago and was appearing at "glamour conventions".

== See also ==
- List of people in Playboy 1960–1969

Leslie Bianchini	Lorrie Menconi	Kathy MacDonald	Lorna Hopper	Sally Sheffield	Helena Antonaccio
Nancy McNeil	Debbie Hooper	Shay Knuth	Jean Bell	Claudia Jennings	Gloria Root
