= Lenna =

Standard test image

Image of Lena Forsén used in many image processing experiments. (Click on the image to access the actual 512×512px standard test version.)

Lenna (or Lena) is a standard test image used in the field of digital image processing, starting in 1973. It is a picture of the Swedish model Lena Forsén, shot by photographer Dwight Hooker and cropped from the centerfold of the November 1972 issue of Playboy magazine. Lenna has attracted controversy because of its subject matter. Starting in the mid-2010s, many journals have deemed it inappropriate and discouraged its use, while others have banned it from publication outright. Forsén herself has called for it to be retired, saying "It's time I retired from tech."

The spelling "Lenna" came from Forsén's desire to encourage the proper pronunciation of her name. "I didn't want to be called Leena [English: /ˈliːnə/]," she explained.

== History ==
Before Lenna, the first use of a Playboy magazine image to illustrate image processing algorithms was in 1961. Lawrence G. Roberts used two cropped six-bit grayscale facsimile scanned images from Playboy's July 1960 issue featuring Playmate Teddi Smith, in his master's thesis on image dithering at Massachusetts Institute of Technology.

Lenna was originally intended for high resolution color image processing study. Its history was described in the May 2001 newsletter of the IEEE Professional Communication Society, in an article by Jamie Hutchinson:

Alexander Sawchuk estimates that it was in June or July of 1973 when he, then an assistant professor of electrical engineering at the University of Southern California Signal and Image Processing Institute (SIPI), along with a graduate student and the SIPI lab manager, was hurriedly searching the lab for a good image to scan for a colleague's conference paper. They got tired of their stock of usual test images, dull stuff dating back to television standards work in the early 1960s. They wanted something glossy to ensure good output dynamic range, and they wanted a human face. Just then, somebody happened to walk in with a recent issue of Playboy. The engineers tore away the top third of the centerfold so they could wrap it around the drum of their Muirhead wirephoto scanner, which they had outfitted with analog-to-digital converters (one each for the red, green, and blue channels) and a Hewlett Packard 2100 minicomputer. The Muirhead had a fixed resolution of 100 lines per inch and the engineers wanted a 512×512 image, so they limited the scan to the top 5.12 inches of the picture, effectively cropping it at the subject's shoulders.

The image's reach was limited in the 1970s and 80s, which is reflected in it initially only appearing in .org domains, but in July 1991, the image featured on the cover of Optical Engineering alongside Peppers, another popular test image. This drew the attention of Playboy to the potential copyright infringement. The peak of image hits on the internet was in 1995. The scan became one of the most used images in computer history. The use of the photo in electronic imaging has been described as "clearly one of the most important events in [its] history". The image spread to over 100 different domains, particularly .com and .edu.

In a 1999 issue of IEEE Transactions on Image Processing "Lena" was used in three separate articles, and the picture continued to appear in scientific journals throughout the beginning of the 21st century.

Lenna is so widely accepted in the image processing community that Forsén was a guest at the 50th annual Conference of the Society for Imaging Science and Technology (IS&T) in 1997. In 2015, Lena Forsén was also guest of honor at the banquet of IEEE ICIP 2015. After delivering a speech, she chaired the best paper award ceremony.

To explain why the image became a standard in the field, David C. Munson, editor-in-chief of IEEE Transactions on Image Processing, stated that it was a good test image because of its detail, flat regions, shading, and texture. He also noted that "the Lena image is a picture of an attractive woman. It is not surprising that the (mostly male) image processing research community gravitated toward an image that they found attractive."

While Playboy often cracks down on illegal uses of its material and did initially send a notice to the publisher of Optical Engineering about its unauthorized use in that publication, over time it has decided to overlook the wide use of Lena. Eileen Kent, VP of new media at Playboy, said, "We decided we should exploit this, because it is a phenomenon."

== Criticism ==
The use of the image has produced controversy because Playboy is "seen (by some) as being degrading to women". In a 1999 essay on reasons for the male predominance in computer science, applied mathematician Dianne P. O'Leary wrote:

Suggestive pictures used in lectures on image processing ... convey the message that the lecturer caters to the males only. For example, it is amazing that the "Lena" pin-up image is still used as an example in courses and published as a test image in journals today.

A 2012 paper on compressed sensing used a photo of the model Fabio Lanzoni as a test image to draw attention to this issue.

Heather Warren-Crow argues that Lenna is an example of how the plasticity of digital images (such as malleability and scalability) is entwined with the plasticity of girlhood, which also holds cultural notions of plasticity.

The use of the test image at the magnet school Thomas Jefferson High School for Science and Technology in Fairfax County, Virginia, provoked a guest editorial by a senior in The Washington Post in 2015 about its detrimental impact on aspiring female students in computer science.

In 2017, the Journal of Modern Optics published an editorial titled "On alternatives to Lenna" suggesting three images (Pirate, Cameraman, and Peppers) that "are reasonably close to Lenna in feature space".

In 2018, the Nature Nanotechnology journal announced that they would no longer consider articles using Lenna. In the same year SPIE, the publishers of Optical Engineering, also announced that they "strongly discourage" the use of Lenna, and would no longer consider new submissions containing the image "without convincing scientific justification for its use". They noted that aside from the copyright and ethical issues, that it was also no longer useful as a standard image: "In today's age of high-resolution digital image technology, it seems difficult to argue that a 512 × 512 image produced with a 1970s-era analog scanner is the best we have to offer as an image quality test standard".

Forsén stated in the 2019 documentary film Losing Lena, "I retired from modeling a long time ago. It's time I retired from tech, too... Let's commit to losing me."

The Institute of Electrical and Electronics Engineers (IEEE) announced that, starting April 1, 2024, it will no longer allow use of Lenna in its publications.

== See also ==
- Carole Hersee
- China Girl (filmmaking)
- Lorem ipsum
- Shirley cards
- Stanford bunny
- Suzanne (3D model)
- Textures: A Photographic Album for Artists and Designers
- Utah teapot
- Will Smith eating spaghetti test

== Sources ==
- Mayer, Gregory (2009). "the waterloo image repository". uwaterloo.ca. Archived from the original on 22 July 2023.
- "The USC-SIPI Image Database". Viterbi School of Engineering. 1981. Archived from the original on 1 January 2023. "cksum misc/4.2.04.tiff 4014024639"
