= Standard test image =

Digital image used to test image algorithms

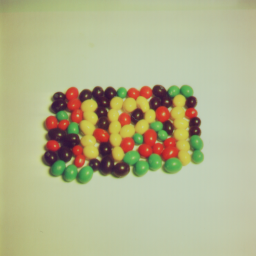
Test image of jelly beans from the USC-SIPI image database

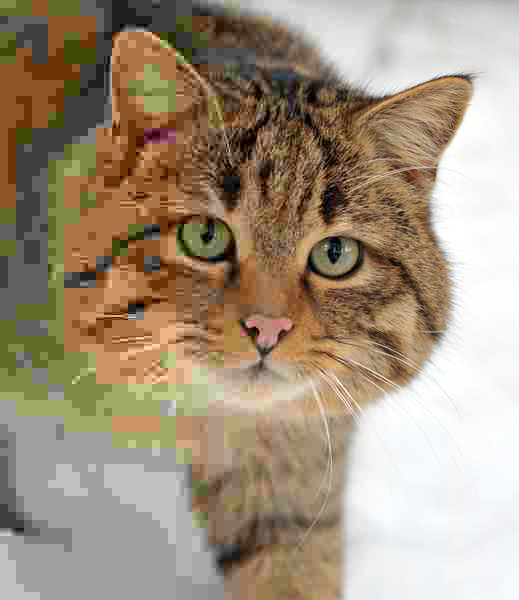
An image of the European wildcat (F. silvestris) being used to demonstrate the relationship between the rate of JPEG compression and image quality

A standard test image is a digital image file used across different institutions to test image processing and image compression algorithms. By using the same standard test images, different labs are able to compare results, both visually and quantitatively.

The images are in many cases chosen to represent natural or typical images that a class of processing techniques would need to deal with. Other test images are chosen because they present a range of challenges to image reconstruction algorithms, such as the reproduction of fine detail and textures, sharp transitions and edges, and uniform regions.

== Historical origins ==
Test images as transmission system calibration material probably date back to the original Paris to Lyon pantelegraph link. Analogue fax equipment (and photographic equipment for the printing trade) were the largest user groups of the standardized image for calibration technology until the coming of television and digital image transmission systems.

== Common test image resolutions ==
The standard resolution of the images is usually 512×512 or 720×576. Most of these images are available as TIFF files from the University of Southern California's Signal and Image Processing Institute. Kodak has released 768×512 images, available as PNGs, that was originally on Photo CD with higher resolution, that are widely used for comparing image compression techniques.

== See also ==
- Carole Hersee
- FERET database (DARPA/NIST face recognition database)
- Lenna
- List of common 3D test models
