= List of Playboy Playmates of 1972 =

The following is a list of Playboy Playmates of 1972. Playboy magazine names their Playmate of the Month each month throughout the year.

== January ==
Marilyn Cole

Playboy Playmate of the Year
- 1973
- Preceded by: Liv Lindeland
- Succeeded by: Cyndi Wood

Personal details
- Born: 7 May 1949 (age 77) Portsmouth, England
- Height: 5 ft 8 in (1.73 m)

Marilyn Cole (born 7 May 1949, Portsmouth, England) is Playboy magazine's January 1972 Playmate of the Month, as well as their 1973 Playmate of the Year, the only Briton to hold that title. Her original pictorial was photographed by Alexas Urba.

== February ==
P.J. Lansing

Personal details
- Born: October 13, 1949 (age 76) Frankford, Missouri, United States
- Height: 5 ft 4 in (1.63 m)

P.J. Lansing (born October 13, 1949, in Frankford, Missouri) is an American model. She was Playboy's Playmate of the Month for its February 1972 issue. Her centerfold was photographed by Pompeo Posar.

== March ==
Ellen Michaels

Personal details
- Born: February 12, 1953 (age 73) Queens, New York, United States
- Height: 5 ft 3 in (1.60 m)

Ellen Michaels (born February 12, 1953, in Queens) is an American model and photographer.

She was Playboy magazine's Playmate of the Month for the March 1972 issue. Her centerfold was photographed by Dwight Hooker.

Michaels, who was getting a degree in elementary education at the time of her pictorial, went on to become a successful model for everything from advertising campaigns to romance novels. She appears on many record album covers including The Salsoul Orchestra, Eric Clapton, and Barrabas.

She also has donated much of her time to charity work with disabled people and senior citizens, and ran a volunteer program for the blind for many years.

She is currently a wildlife and nature photographer, specializing in photos of the birds, butterflies, insects and landscapes of Central Park in New York City.

== April ==
Vicki Peters

Personal details
- Born: September 9, 1950 (age 76) Minneapolis, Minnesota, United States
- Height: 5 ft 8 in (1.73 m)

Vicki Peters (born September 9, 1950, in Minneapolis) is an American model and actress. She was Playboy magazine's Playmate of the Month for its April 1972 issue. Her centerfold was photographed by Mario Casilli. In 1970, Peters appeared in the film Blood Mania.

== May ==
Deanna Baker

Personal details
- Born: December 29, 1949 (age 76) St. Louis, Missouri, United States
- Height: 5 ft 7 in (1.70 m)

Deanna Baker (born December 29, 1949, in St. Louis) is an American model. She was chosen by Playboy magazine to be its Playmate of the Month for May 1972. She was also a Playboy Bunny at the Denver club.

== June ==
Debbie Davis

Personal details
- Born: September 9, 1951 (age 75) Pittsburgh, Pennsylvania
- Height: 5 ft 7 in (1.70 m)

Debbie Davis (born September 9, 1951, in Pittsburgh) is an American model. She was Playboy magazine's Playmate of the Month for June 1972. Her centerfold was photographed by William Figge.

== July ==
Carol O'Neal

Personal details
- Born: August 18, 1948 (age 78) New York City, New York, United States
- Height: 5 ft 6 in (1.68 m)

Carol O'Neal (born August 18, 1948, in New York City) is an American model. She is best known as Playboy magazine's Playmate of the Month for its July 1972 issue. Her centerfold was photographed by Richard Fegley. O'Neal had a small part in the 1979 film When a Stranger Calls. She was later married to former NFL Quarterback Bobby Douglass.

== August ==
Linda Summers

Personal details
- Born: November 20, 1950 (age 75) San Diego, California, U.S.
- Height: 5 ft 2 in (1.57 m)

Linda Summers (born November 20, 1950, in San Diego) is an American model. She was Playboy magazine's Playmate of the Month for the August 1972 issue. Her centerfold was photographed by William Figge and Ed DeLong.

== September ==
Susan Miller

Personal details
- Born: March 22, 1947 (age 79) New York City, New York United States
- Height: 6 ft 1 in (1.85 m)

Susan Miller (born March 22, 1947, in New York City) is an American model and actress. She was Playboy magazine's Playmate of the Month for the September 1972 issue. Her centerfold was photographed by Mario Casilli.

== October ==
Sharon Johansen

Personal details
- Born: October 11, 1948 (age 77) Norway
- Height: 5 ft 8 in (1.73 m)

Sharon Johansen (born October 11, 1948) is a Norwegian-American model and actress. She was Playboy magazine's Playmate of the Month for its October 1972 issue. Her centerfold was photographed by Alexas Urba. Johansen was born in Norway, but when she was a year old her family moved to Wisconsin.

For a brief time, Johansen worked as a receptionist for Pierre Salinger. She posed nude for the December 1979 Playboy pictorial "Playmates Forever!"

== November ==
Lena Forsén

Personal details
- Born: March 31, 1951 (age 75) Sweden
- Height: 5 ft 6 in (1.68 m)

Lena Forsén (born March 31, 1951, in Sweden) appeared as a Playmate in the November 1972 issue of Playboy magazine, under the name Lenna Sjööblom. Her centerfold was photographed by Dwight Hooker.

Her photo (known as Lenna) is often used in the field of digital image processing.

== December ==
Mercy Rooney

Personal details
- Born: June 21, 1950 (age 76) New Jersey
- Height: 5 ft 4 in (1.63 m)

Mercy Rooney (born Merci Montello on June 21, 1950, in New Jersey) is an American model and actress. She was the December 1972 Playmate of the Month. Her centerfold was photographed by Alexas Urba. In March 1973 she was the Playmate of the Month in the German edition of Playboy and simultaneously appeared on the covers of the U.S., German, French and Italian editions. She was also a Playboy Bunny at the Los Angeles club.

== See also ==
- List of people in Playboy 1970–1979

Marilyn Cole	P. J. Lansing	Ellen Michaels	Vicki Peters	Deanna Baker	Debbie Davis
Carol O'Neal	Linda Summers	Susan Miller	Sharon Johansen	Lena Söderberg	Mercy Rooney
