= List of Playboy Playmates of 1976 =

The following is a list of Playboy Playmates of 1976. Playboy magazine names its Playmate of the Month each month throughout the year.

== January ==
Daina House

Personal details
- Born: December 30, 1954 (age 70); Dallas, Texas, United States
- Height: 5 ft 7 in (1.70 m)

Daina House (born December 30, 1954, in Dallas, Texas) is a former model and actress. She was Playboy magazine's Playmate of the Month for its January 1976 issue. Her centerfold was photographed by Ken Marcus.

== February ==
Laura Lyons

Personal details
- Born: October 22, 1954 (age 70); Los Angeles, California, United States
- Height: 5 ft 5 in (1.65 m)

Laura Lyons (born October 22, 1954) is an American model. She was Playboy magazine's Playmate of the Month for its February 1976 issue. Her centerfold was photographed by Dwight Hooker and Mario Casilli. She worked as a Playboy Bunny in the Chicago Playboy Club prior to becoming a Playmate, and led a protest and brief strike gaining improved work privileges such as the freedom to date customers.

== March ==
Ann Pennington

Personal details
- Born: June 3, 1950 (age 75); Seattle, Washington, United States
- Height: 5 ft 5.5 in (1.66 m)

Ann Victoria Pennington (born June 3, 1950, in Seattle, Washington) is an American model and actress. She was Playboy magazine's Playmate of the Month for its March 1976 issue. Her centerfold was photographed by Pompeo Posar and Phillip Dixon. She is the sister of Janice Pennington, and like Janice, appeared as a model on game shows.

Pennington was married to Shaun Cassidy.

== April ==
Denise Michele

Personal details
- Born: June 12, 1953 (age 72); San Francisco, California, United States
- Height: 5 ft 6 in (1.68 m)

Denise Michele (born June 12, 1953, in San Francisco, California) is a former model who was Playboy magazine's Playmate of the Month for April 1976. Her Playboy pictorial was shot by Ken Marcus. She is also featured in a number of Playboy videos. She appears on the album cover of Robert Palmer's Some People Can Do What They Like (1976) and had some minor movie and TV roles.

== May ==
Patricia McClain

Personal details
- Born: May 3, 1954 (age 71); Long Beach, California, United States
- Height: 5 ft 8 in (1.73 m)

Patricia Margot McClain (born May 3, 1954, in Long Beach, California) is an American model. She was Playboy magazine's Playmate of the Month for its May 1976 issue. Her centerfold was photographed by Ken Marcus.

In 1996, McClain's firing from her office manager job over her Playmate past made national news. Her lawsuit was settled for an undisclosed sum. After the firing, she worked for Playboy in their editing department. In 1999, she attempted to challenge Elton Gallegly for the Republican Congressional nomination in his Ventura County district.

== June ==
Debra Peterson

Personal details
- Born: April 13, 1955 (age 70); Santa Monica, California, United States
- Height: 5 ft 6 in (1.68 m)

Debra Peterson (born April 13, 1955, in Santa Monica, California) is an American model. She was Playboy magazine's Playmate of the Month for its June 1976 issue. Her centerfold was photographed by Pompeo Posar.

== July ==
Deborah Borkman

Personal details
- Born: January 8, 1957 (age 68); Virginia
- Height: 5 ft 4 in (1.63 m)

Deborah Borkman (born January 8, 1957, in Virginia) is an American model of Swedish and Japanese descent. She was Playboy magazine's Playmate of the Month for its July 1976 issue. Her centerfold was photographed by Phillip Dixon.

== August ==
Linda Beatty

Personal details
- Born: September 16, 1952 (age 72); Louisville, Kentucky, U.S.
- Height: 5 ft 6 in (1.68 m)

Linda Beatty (born September 16, 1952, in Louisville, Kentucky) is a model and actress. She was Playboy magazine's Playmate of the Month for the August 1976 issue. Her centerfold was photographed by Phillip Dixon and Ken Marcus. Her most prominent movie role was that of a Playmate doing a USO tour in the Vietnam War epic Apocalypse Now.

== September ==
Whitney Kaine

Personal details
- Born: September 20, 1956 (age 68); Ogden, Utah, United States
- Height: 5 ft 3 in (1.60 m)

Whitney Kaine (born September 20, 1956, in Ogden, Utah) is an American model. She was Playboy magazine's Playmate of the Month for its September 1976 issue. Her centerfold was photographed by Grant Edwards and Phillip Dixon.

== October ==
Hope Olson

Personal details
- Born: April 4, 1956 (age 69); Prairie du Chien, Wisconsin, United States
- Height: 5 ft 8 in (1.73 m)

Hope Olson (born April 4, 1956, in Prairie du Chien, Wisconsin) is an American model. She was Playboy magazine's Playmate of the Month for its October 1976 issue. Her centerfold was photographed by Ken Marcus.

== November ==
Patti McGuire

Playboy Playmate of the Year
- 1977
- Preceded by: Lillian Müller
- Succeeded by: Debra Jo Fondren

Personal details
- Born: September 5, 1951 (age 73); Dexter, Missouri, United States
- Height: 5 ft 5 in (1.65 m)

Patti McGuire (born September 5, 1951, in Dexter, Missouri) is an American model and television producer. She was Playboy magazine's Playmate of the Month for the November 1976 issue, and the 1977 Playmate of the Year. Her original pictorial was photographed by Pompeo Posar. She married tennis star Jimmy Connors in 1979; they have two children.

== December ==
Karen Hafter

Personal details
- Born: December 27, 1954 (age 70); New York City, New York
- Height: 5 ft 8 in (1.73 m)

Karen Hafter (born December 27, 1954, in New York City) is an American model. She was Playboy magazine's Playmate of the Month for its December 1976 issue. Her centerfold was photographed by Phillip Dixon.

== See also ==
- List of people in Playboy 1970–1979

Daina House	Laura Lyons	Ann Pennington	Denise Michele	Patricia McClain	Debra Peterson
Deborah Borkman	Linda Beatty	Whitney Kaine	Hope Olson	Patti McGuire	Karen Hafter
