= David Chan (photographer) =

David Chan (May 19, 1929 – October 17, 2017) was an American photographer. He was a photographer for Playboy magazine from the 1960s to the 2000s.
