= Richard Fegley =

American photographer (1936–2001)

- Born: Leon Richard Fegley; November 29, 1936; United States
- Died: September 15, 2001 (aged 64); Chicago, Illinois, United States
- Occupation: Photographer

Leon Richard Fegley (November 29, 1936 – September 15, 2001) was an American photographer who worked for Playboy magazine for 30 years.

Fegley started taking photos during a stint in the United States Air Force and eventually attended the Art Center College of Design in Pasadena, California. In 1971 he joined Playboy as a freelance photographer. His first Playboy Playmate was Carol O'Neal, for the July 1972 issue. In all he photographed 91 Playmates, including Shannon Tweed, Kimberley Conrad, Erika Eleniak, Kelly Monaco and Karen McDougal. Fegley also photographed many covers for Playboy, as well as several celebrities, including adult film star Marilyn Chambers.

In 1982 Richard Fegley released a book titled Dreams, published by PEI Books Inc., that shows many of the images that he had taken on locations that ranged from Paris and Venice to Tokyo and an ocean liner.

He died on September 15, 2001, in Chicago after complications from surgery.
