= Ken Marcus =

American photographer (born 1946)

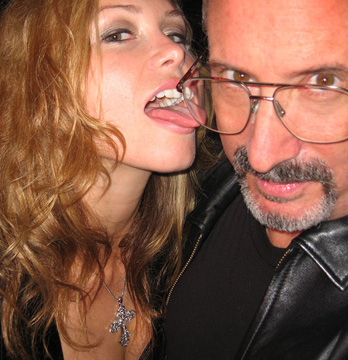
- Marcus with Heather Vandeven at AVN Awards Show
- Born: October 2, 1946 (age 79); Hollywood, California, U.S.
- Education: Art Center College of Design, Brooks Institute of Photography, Ansel Adams
- Known for: Photography

Ken Marcus (born October 2, 1946) is an American photographer, best known for his work in glamour and erotic photography with Penthouse and Playboy magazines and for his own website. For over 50 years, he has produced hundreds of centerfolds, editorials, album covers, and advertisements. For many years, Marcus has lectured and conducted workshops in the US and internationally.

== Early life and education ==
Marcus's formal fine-art photographic training began at age 12. He studied with landscape photographer Ansel Adams in Yosemite National Park for 13 years as well as with Brett Weston, Paul Caponigro, Wynn Bullock, Imogen Cunningham and Judy Dater, all of whom influenced his early work.

Marcus attended the ArtCenter College of Design studying fashion and advertising photography. He later attended the Brooks Institute. At age 18, he opened his studio on Melrose Avenue in Hollywood, Los Angeles, where he worked for the next 53 years. In 2019, Marcus moved his studio operation to the Las Vegas, Nevada, area.

== Career ==
In 1965, Marcus established his studio on Melrose Avenue in Hollywood. His earliest commercial work consisted of product shots, catalogs, and corporate and editorial assignments.

Throughout his 20s, Marcus's commercial assignments included product and fashion catalogs, architectural interiors, food illustration, magazine editorials, and advertising photography. Within five years of opening his studio, his work received national publicity and several Art Directors Club awards.

By the early 1970s, Marcus shot regularly for Max Factor, Frederick's of Hollywood, and other West Coast fashion clients. He also photographed musicians for album covers and posters, including the inside gatefold of George Harrison's Living in the Material World.

=== Glamour photography ===
In 1971, Marcus became the first American photographer for Penthouse magazine. His early pictorials involved couples and models photographed through heavy, soft-focus diffusion. This technique, popular in the early 20th century, had not been used in publication since the early 1920s. Marcus crafted his own homemade diffusion filters because none were available on the commercial market.

In 1974, Marcus left Penthouse to become the West Coast contributing photographer at Playboy magazine. For 11 years, Marcus's work was featured regularly in Playboy's 15 international editions, and for eight of those years Marcus exclusively photographed the Playboy Calendar. Between 1974 and 1985, he produced 41 Playmate layouts, over 100 calendars, covers, and editorials, and twice received Playboy's "Photographer of the Year Award".

Shortly thereafter, Marcus began shooting pictorials and centerfolds for Penthouse again. New clients at this time included Jordache, Snap-on Tools, NAPA, and Muscle & Fitness magazine.

=== Fine-art photography ===
Originally interested only in landscape fine-art photography, Marcus began taking a serious interest in nude photography as art while working with Playboy.

In the early 1980s, his nude studies of dancers with the Los Angeles Ballet were first exhibited in Los Angeles.

In 1988, Marcus was selected as the Artist-In-Residence at the Yosemite National Park Museum. His images of nude models in nature were originally banned by park officials, but are now shown as part of the museum's permanent collection.

Throughout his career, Marcus has done black-and-white portraits of celebrities such as Kareem Abdul-Jabbar, Virginia Madsen, Fabio Lanzoni, Vincent Price, Pamela Anderson, and Tom Arnold.

=== Monterey Pop Festival discovery ===
Marcus was one of two official photographers at the 1967 Monterey Pop Festival. The images of Jimi Hendrix, Janis Joplin, The Who, Simon & Garfunkel, and Brian Jones of the Rolling Stones were rediscovered in 2005 during a studio remodel.

His photograph of Jimi Hendrix appears on the Jimi Hendrix album The Jimi Hendrix Experience: Live at Monterey, released in October 2007.

== Appearances and pop culture references ==
Marcus appeared in the opening scenes of the Baywatch TV movie Panic at Malibu Pier. His character is a photographer shooting a glamour layout that featured nudity on the beach.

In the comic book series Rocketeer, artist Dave Stevens portrayed Marcus as the nefarious Marco of Hollywood with a readily identifiable caricature.

== Books ==
- Contemporary American Erotic Photography: Volume 1 (1984) (contributing photographer)
- California Club (1996)
- Two Faces (1996)
- Two Knotty Boys: Back on the Ropes (2009)

== Awards ==
- 1973 "Award of Distinctive Merit" at the Art Directors Club Annual Awards
- 1980 "Editorial Award for Photography" by Playboy
- 1981 "Editorial Award for Photography" by Playboy
- 1992 "Best Photography – Studio" at the Academy of Bodybuilding and Fitness Awards
- 2001 "Publisher's Choice Award" by Adult Stars magazine
- 2010 "Best Bondage Photographer" by The Bondage Awards
