= Alexandria Karlsen =

American model and actress

Lexie Karlsen
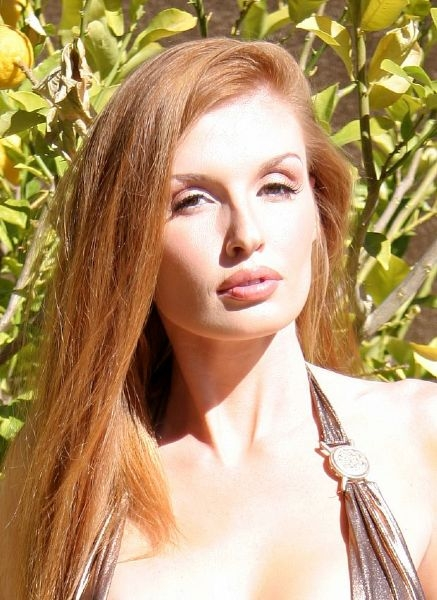

Playboy centerfold appearance
- March 1999
- Preceded by: Stacy Marie Fuson
- Succeeded by: Natalia Sokolova

Personal details
- Born: October 26, 1978 (age 47) Mesa, Arizona
- Height: 5 ft 7 in (1.70 m)
- Official website

Alexandria ("Lexie") Karlsen (born October 26, 1978) is a US model, actress and author.

== Career ==
=== Finance ===
At age 18, Karlsen obtained her Series 6 and Series 63 securities licenses and worked for The Vanguard Group before posing as Playboy Magazine's Miss March 1999.

=== Print modeling ===
Karlsen appeared in the Summer 1997 premiere issue of Perfect 10. She was Playboy's Playmate of the Month for March 1999, photographed by Arny Freytag and Stephen Wayda. Karlsen appeared in several Playboy videos and special editions, working for Playboy following her centerfold appearance. Karlsen was featured in the November 2002 issue of Stuff magazine in the layout titled "A Day in the Life of a Centerfold". Karlsen appeared in Penthouse as its Pet of the Month for July 2006. Her appearance in Penthouse made her only the third model, following Linn Thomas and Victoria Zdrok, to appear as both a Playboy Playmate and a Penthouse Pet.

Karlsen also works extensively in mainstream modeling, represented by Ford/ RBA. Karlsen has appeared in numerous mainstream magazines, including Stuff (US), Stuff (UK), Maxim, Beverly Hills 213, Scottsdale magazine, Phoenix magazine, and numerous other catalogs, editorial and print.

=== Television and Film ===
In addition to her work with men's magazines, Karlsen was regularly featured on the FX channel's The X Show, UPN's Battle Dome, and as a try-out Barker's Beauty on five episodes of CBS's The Price Is Right show. She has also worked on shows such as Ripley's Believe It or Not, Talk Soup, The Late Late Show, The Tonight Show, and others.

=== Writing ===
At age 15, Karlsen began writing for then what was The Phoenix Gazette / Arizona Republic and the Tribune Newspapers in Arizona as a student correspondent reporter. Karlsen authored a book titled The Divorced Guy's Guide to Dating: How to Meet More Women plus many other columns and articles for other online and print publications, including a regular column on love and dating for Perfect 10.

== Personal life ==
Karlsen is the daughter of Thomas Karlsen, long-time Campaign Treasurer for Arizona Senator Dennis DeConcini.

Karlsen dated Philadelphia businessman Andrew Yao for about four months in late 2001. When Yao was later investigated by federal prosecutors for fraud and money laundering, Karlsen was the prosecution's star witness. Yao's gifts to her, including wire transfers from company accounts, jewelry, an automobile and a house, totaled nearly $1 million.

She changed her name to Alexandria Lexie Wolfe. On 11 November 2015, while a police officer in Scottsdale, Arizona, was pursuing a speeding vehicle, she collided with the police officer's motorcycle. Wolfe suffered injuries to her chest and spine.

== See also ==
- List of people in Playboy 1990–1999
- List of Playboy NSS models
- List of people from Arizona

Preceded by (rotating position)	The Price Is Right Barker's Beauty; 2003 (five episodes)	Succeeded by (rotating position)

Jaime Bergman	Stacy Marie Fuson	Alexandria Karlsen	Natalia Sokolova	Tishara Cousino	Kimberly Spicer
Jennifer Rovero	Rebecca Scott	Kristi Cline	Jodi Ann Paterson	Cara Wakelin	Brooke Richards
