= List of Playboy Playmates of 1993 =

The following is a list of Playboy Playmates of 1993. Playboy magazine names its Playmate of the Month each month throughout the year.

== January ==
Echo Johnson

Personal details
- Born: January 11, 1974 (age 52) Austin, Texas, U.S.
- Height: 5 ft 7 in (1.70 m)

Echo Leta Johnson (born January 11, 1974, in Austin, Texas) is an American model. She is Playboy's Playmate of the Month for January 1993, has appeared in Playboy videos and had a cameo role in Citizen Toxie: The Toxic Avenger IV. Johnson was also Playmate of the Month for the October 1992 issue of Playboy's German edition.

In 1992, Johnson graduated from Santa Fe High School. She also modeled for the Frederick's of Hollywood catalog.

== February ==
Jennifer LeRoy

Personal details
- Born: January 7, 1974 (age 52) Craig, Colorado, U.S.
- Height: 5 ft 10 in (1.78 m)

Jennifer LeRoy (born January 7, 1974, Craig, Colorado) is an American model and actress. She is Playboy's Playmate of the Month for February 1993, and has appeared in Playboy videos. She is the sister of Olympic skier Andy LeRoy.

== March ==
Kimberly Donley

Personal details
- Born: December 15, 1965 (age 60) Aurora, Illinois, U.S.
- Height: 5 ft 8 in (1.73 m)

Kimberly Donley (born December 15, 1965, in Aurora, Illinois) is an American model and actress. She is Playboy's Playmate of the Month for March 1993.

== April ==
Nicole Wood

Personal details
- Born: February 4, 1970 (age 56) Canton, Ohio, U.S.
- Height: 5 ft 6 in (1.68 m)

Nicole Wood (born February 4, 1970, in Canton, Ohio) is an American model. She is Playboy magazine's Playmate of the Month for April 1993, and she has appeared in several Playboy videos and special editions following her centerfold appearance. She was also on the Playboy X-Treme Team. In 2001, Wood released her own cosmetics company called Unique Face Cosmetics. As of 2004, Wood was serving as a Playboy Bunny.

== May ==
Elke Jeinsen
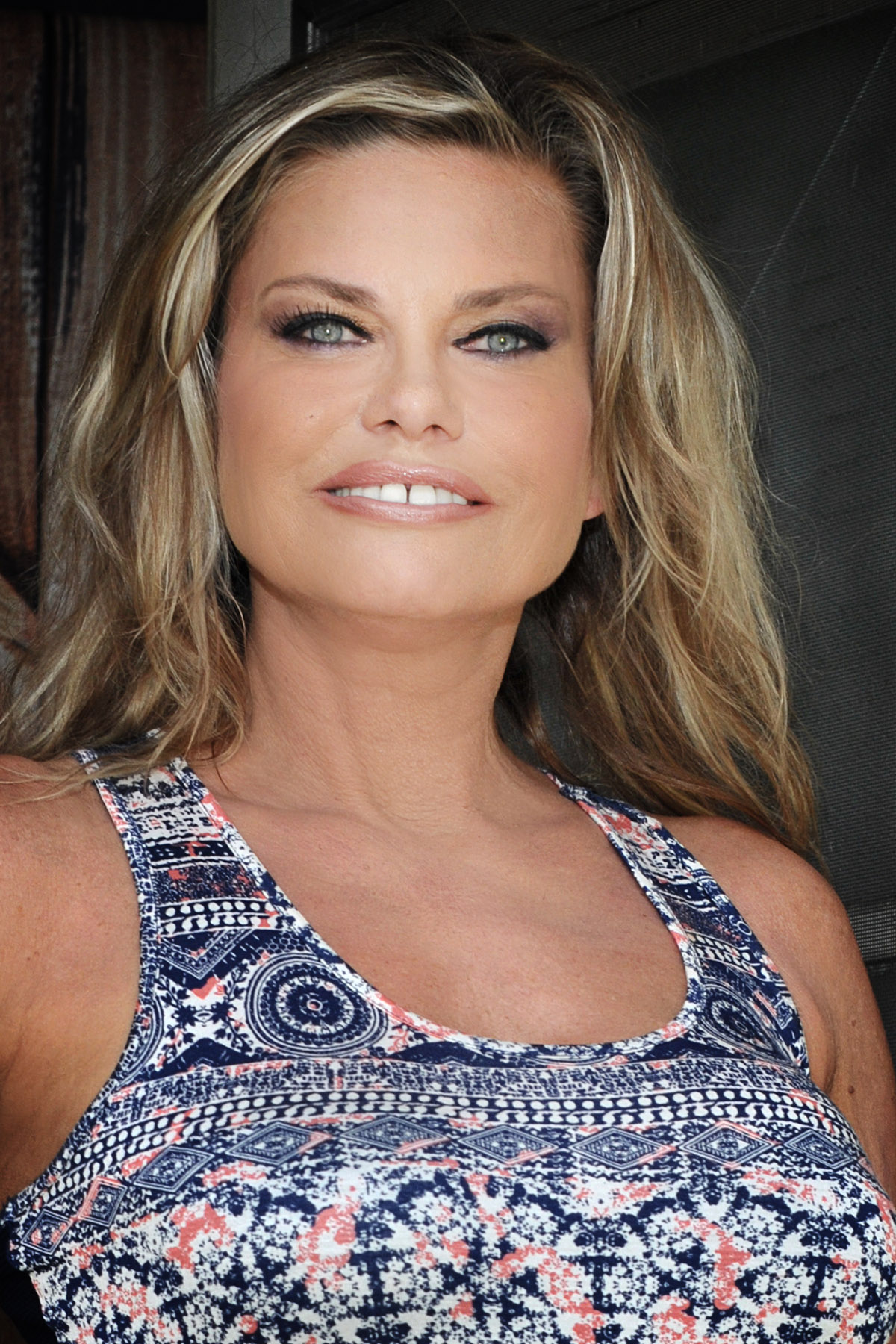
- Elke Jeinsen, Los Angeles, California on March 20, 2016

Personal details
- Born: 25 July 1966 (age 60) Hanover, Germany
- Height: 5 ft 8.5 in (1.74 m)

Elke Erica Weintraub Jeinsen (born July 25, 1966) is a German model and actress from Hanover, Germany. Jeinsen was born in Sweden but her family relocated to then West Germany during the first year of her life. Jeinsen was selected as Playboy Germany's Playmate of the Month for October 1986, and then as the US edition's Playmate of the Month for May 1993. Her centerfold was photographed by Arny Freytag.

== June ==
Alesha Oreskovich

Personal details
- Born: May 21, 1972 (age 54) Tampa, Florida, U.S.
- Height: 5 ft 8 in (1.73 m)

Alesha Marie Oreskovich (born May 21, 1972, Tampa, Florida, U.S.) is an American model who appeared in Playboy magazines and videos. She is Playmate of the Month for June 1993. Her centerfold, which was photographed by Richard Fegley, was modeled after that of Miss December 1975, Nancie Li Brandi.

== July ==
Leisa Sheridan

Personal details
- Born: May 28, 1964 Omaha, Nebraska, U.S.
- Died: October 2, 2021 (aged 57)
- Height: 5 ft 7 in (1.70 m)

Leisa Sheridan (born May 28, 1964 - October 2, 2021) is an American model and actress. She is Playboy's Playmate of the Month for July 1993. Her centerfold was photographed by Arny Freytag and Stephen Wayda.

== August ==
Jennifer Lavoie

Personal details
- Born: February 25, 1971 (age 55) Nashua, New Hampshire, U.S.
- Height: 5 ft 4 in (1.63 m)

Jennifer J. Lavoie (born February 25, 1971, in Nashua, New Hampshire) is an American model, actress and entrepreneur. She is Playboy's Playmate of the Month for August 1993, and she appeared on the cover of the October 1994 issue of the magazine. Her centerfold was photographed by Richard Fegley. Jennifer has appeared in Playboy videos and special editions, working for Playboy for more than seven years following her centerfold appearance.

== September ==
Carrie Westcott

Personal details
- Born: December 12, 1969 (age 56) Mission Hills, Kansas, U.S.
- Height: 5 ft 8.5 in (1.74 m)

Carrie Ann Westcott (born December 12, 1969) is an American model and actress. Westcott was born on December 12, 1969, in Mission Hills, Kansas and graduated from Canyon County High School in 1988. She spent her childhood in Mission Viejo, California. She is Playboy's Playmate of the Month for September 1993, and appeared in Playboy videos. Westcott also worked on Playboy TV and appeared in several films.

== October ==
Jenny McCarthy
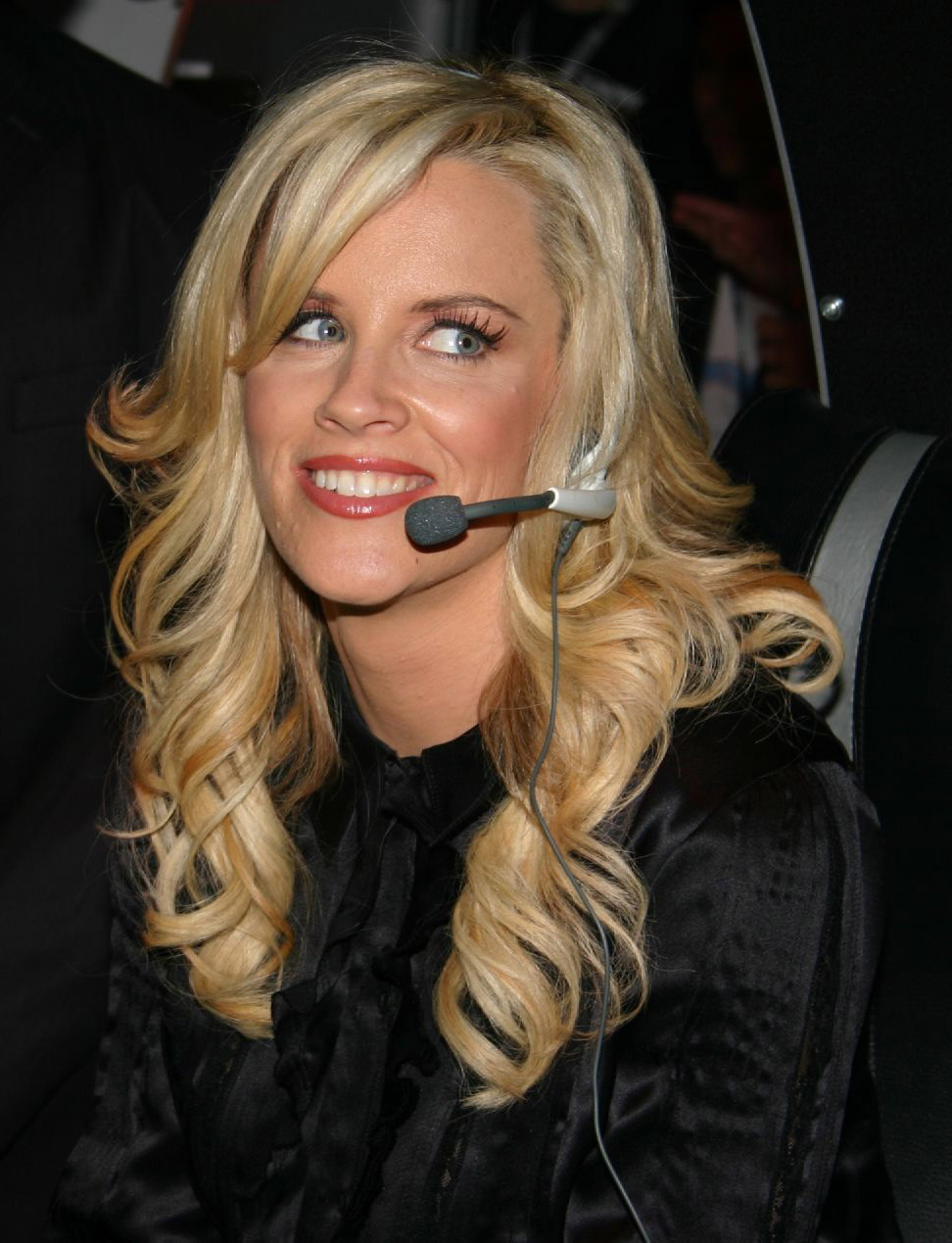

Playboy Playmate of the Year
- 1994
- Preceded by: Anna Nicole Smith
- Succeeded by: Julie Lynn Cialini

Personal details
- Born: 1 November 1972 (age 53) Evergreen Park, Illinois, U.S.
- Height: 5 ft 7 in (1.70 m)

Jennifer Ann "Jenny" McCarthy (born November 1, 1972) is an American model, comedian, actress, author and activist. She began her career as a Playboy's Playmate of the Month for October 1993, before launching a television and film acting career. Most recently, she has written books about parenting, and has become an activist promoting controversial claims that vaccines cause autism and that chelation therapy is effective against autism.

== November ==
Julianna Young

Personal details
- Born: September 19, 1960 (age 65) Fort Campbell, Kentucky, U.S.
- Height: 5 ft 7.5 in (1.71 m)

Julianna Young (born September 19, 1960) is an American model. She is Playboy's Playmate of the Month for November 1993.

== December ==
Arlene Baxter

Personal details
- Born: November 27, 1962 (age 63) Oceanside, California, U.S.
- Died: October 6, 2024 (aged 61)
- Height: 5 ft 11 in (1.80 m)

Arlene Baxter (born November 27, 1962, in Oceanside, California) is an American model. She is Playboy's Playmate of the Month for December 1993. Baxter worked for Elite Model Management. As a model, she has worked for Victoria's Secret, Saks Fifth Avenue, Avon and others. Baxter also works as a photographer.

== See also ==
- List of people in Playboy 1990–1999

Echo Johnson	Jennifer LeRoy	Kimberly Donley	Nicole Wood	Elke Jeinsen	Alesha Oreskovich
Leisa Sheridan	Jennifer Lavoie	Carrie Westcott	Jenny McCarthy	Julianna Young	Arlene Baxter
