= List of Playboy Playmates of 1995 =

The following is a list of Playboy Playmates of 1995. Playboy magazine names their Playmate of the Month each month throughout the year.

== January ==
Melissa Deanne Holliday

Personal details
- Born: October 30, 1969 (age 56) Greenwood, South Carolina, United States
- Height: 5 ft 6 in (168 cm)

Melissa Deanne Holliday (born October 30, 1969) was Playboy magazine's Playmate of the Month for January 1995.

From June 26-July 12, 1995, she underwent ECT for depression at St. John's Hospital and Health Center in Santa Monica, California. She later sued the hospital and the doctors involved in a civil lawsuit for alleged assault and battery and personal injury, claiming she had also been through a rape but "electroshock therapy is worse".

Holliday has sung at a Chrysler convention, worked as an extra on the Baywatch television series, and has done voice-overs for TV commercials.

== February ==
Lisa Marie Scott

Personal details
- Born: February 1, 1974 (age 52) Pensacola, Florida, United States
- Height: 5 ft 1in (1.57 m)

Lisa Marie Scott (born February 1, 1974) is an American model and actress. She appeared as the Playmate of the Month for February 1995 and has continued to appear in Playboy magazines, videos, and television. Scott has also appeared in FHM and Vanity Fair.

In her teens, she won awards and scholarships in ballet, danced on stages from Japan to Switzerland to Los Angeles, and studied with Maximova. She received a ballet scholarship from the University of California, Irvine, studied history at UCLA, and briefly attended UC Berkeley School of Law. Before Playboy, she was a professional ballerina with a company in the Pacific Northwest.

== March ==
Stacy Elizabeth Sanches
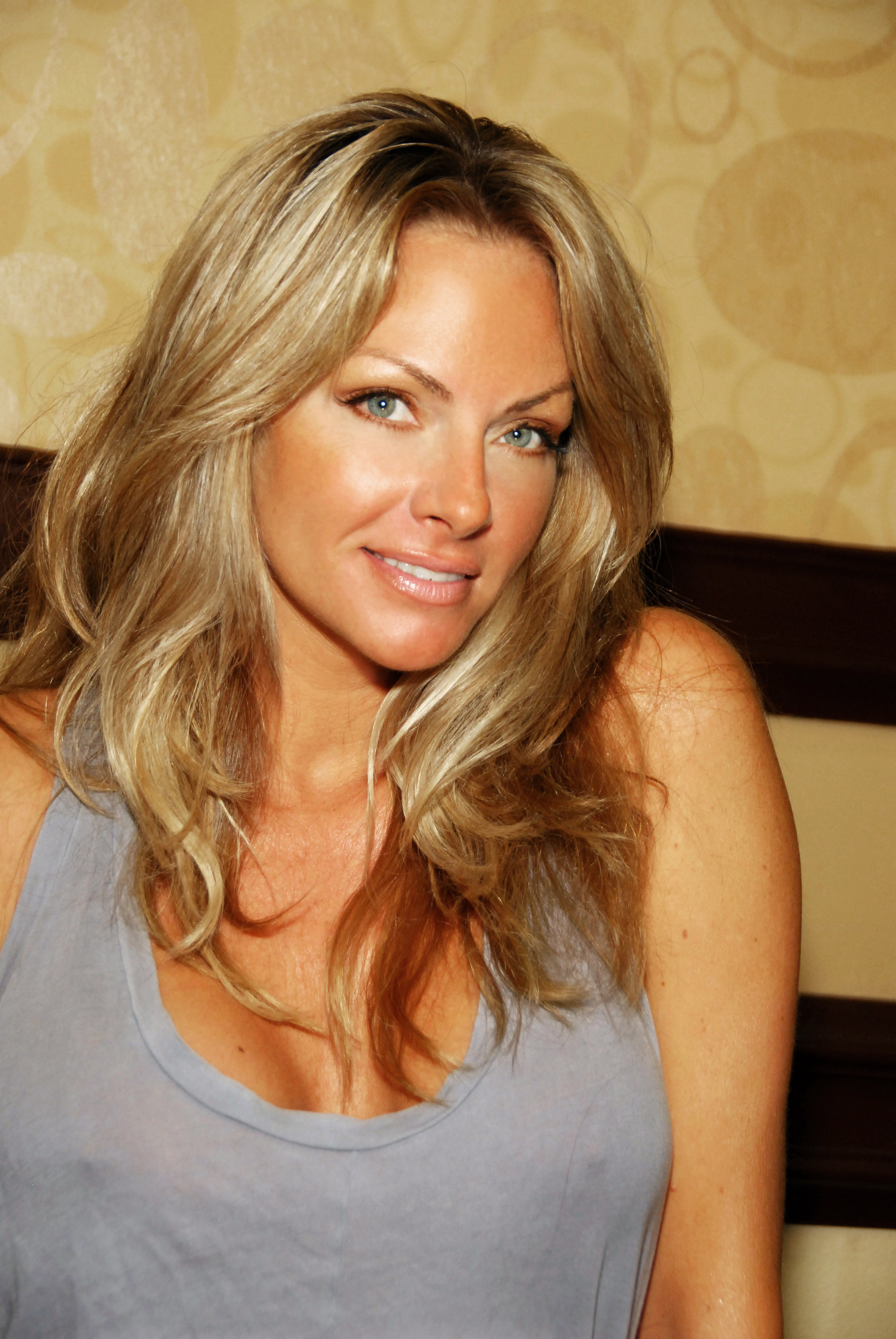
- Sanches in Los Angeles, October 2011

Playboy Playmate of the Year
- 1996
- Preceded by: Julie Lynn Cialini
- Succeeded by: Victoria Silvstedt

Personal details
- Born: September 4, 1973 (age 53) Dallas, Texas, United States
- Height: 5 ft 8 in (173 cm)

Stacy Sanches (born September 4, 1973), is an American model and actress. She was Playboy's Playmate of the Month for March 1995, she was later named Playmate of the Year for 1996. She also became the German edition's Playmate of the Month for June 1996.

== April ==
Danelle Folta

Personal details
- Born: April 19, 1969 (age 57) Hammond, Indiana, United States
- Height: 5 ft 10 in (178 cm)

Danelle Folta (born April 19, 1969, and also known as "Danella Folta") is an American model and actress. She was Playboy magazine's Playmate of the Month for April 1995 and her centerfold was photographed by Richard Fegley. Folta has appeared in Playboy videos and Special Editions, working for Playboy as a model for more than five years following her centerfold appearance.

Folta was captain of the four-member Team Playboy X-treme, which completed the 2000 Eco-Challenge in Borneo, together with Playmates Jennifer Lavoie and Kalin Olson and United States Marine Corps Captain Owen West. As a stunt woman, she has worked on such features as Snow Dogs and All About the Benjamins.

== May ==
Cynthia Gwyn Brown

Personal details
- Born: November 25, 1974 (age 51) San Jose, California, United States
- Height: 5 ft 4 in (163 cm)

Cynthia Gwyn Brown (born November 25, 1974) is an American model. She was Playboy's Playmate of the Month for May 1995. Her Playmate pictorial was photographed by Arny Freytag. She was frequently credited in Playboy's print issues and websites as Cindy Brown and is of Cherokee ancestry.

== June ==
Rhonda Adams

Personal details
- Born: November 27, 1971 (age 54) Columbus, Georgia, United States
- Height: 5 ft 7 in (170 cm)

Rhonda Adams (born November 27, 1971) is an American model. She was Playboy magazine's Playmate of the Month for June 1995. Her centerfold was photographed by Richard Fegley.

== July ==
Heidi Mark

Personal details
- Born: February 18, 1971 (age 55) Columbus, Ohio, United States
- Height: 5 ft 6 in (168 cm)

Heidi Mark (born February 18, 1971, and also known as "Heidi Hanson") is an American model and actress. Heidi is of Finnish origin; her father was born in Helsinki, Finland. She has worked at her father's law office and at Hooters. She was Playboy's Playmate of the Month for July 1995. Prior to being a Playmate, she appeared on the cover of April 1994 issue of the magazine. Mark was married to Vince Neil of Mötley Crüe on May 28, 2000; she divorced him on August 29, 2001, citing "irreconcilable differences".

She was also featured on page 160 of a Japanese Za•Best monthly magazine Special no.148, November 2005.

== August ==
Rachel Jéan Marteen

Personal details
- Born: January 31, 1970 (age 56) Atlanta, Georgia, United States
- Height: 5 ft 6 in (168 cm)

Rachel Jéan Marteen (born January 31, 1970) is an American model and actress. She was Playboy's Playmate of the Month for August 1995 and has appeared in Playboy videos. In May 1999, she was featured in a group pictorial shot on safari in Africa.

She has also appeared in the films Never Again and Star of Jaipur.

== September ==
Donna D'Errico
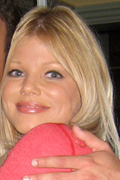
- D'Errico at the Baywatch Reunion DVD Release Party, October 2006

Personal details
- Born: March 30, 1968 (age 58) Dothan, Alabama, United States
- Height: 5 ft 4 in (163 cm)

Donna D'Errico (born March 30, 1968) is an American actress and model. She was Playboy's Playmate of the Month for September 1995. Her centerfold was photographed by Richard Fegley.

D’Errico is a Baywatch alumnus (for two seasons) and has appeared in Austin Powers in Goldmember and Candyman: Day of the Dead.

== October ==
Alicia Rickter

Personal details
- Born: September 21, 1972 (age 54) Long Beach, California, United States
- Height: 5 ft 8 in (173 cm)

Alicia Rickter (born September 21, 1972) is an American model and actress. She appeared as "Laura" in the comedy Buying the Cow, and her notable TV appearances include Baywatch Hawaii and The Young and the Restless. She was Playboy magazine's Miss October 1995. She has also appeared in three Playboy videos.

Rickter married baseball player Mike Piazza on January 29, 2005, in Miami.

== November ==
Holly Witt

Personal details
- Born: December 10, 1968 (age 57) Lima, Pennsylvania, United States
- Height: 5 ft 4 in (163 cm)

Holly Witt (born December 10, 1968) is an American model and actress. She was Playboy's Playmate of the Month for November 1995, who turned out to be the magazine's actual 500th Playmate, and has appeared in numerous Playboy videos.

== December ==
Samantha Torres

Personal details
- Born: October 6, 1973 (age 53) Ibiza, Spain
- Height: 5 ft 8 in (173 cm)

Samantha Torres (born October 6, 1973) is a Spanish model and actress who was Playboy magazine's Playmate of the Month for December 1995. She has also appeared in Playboy videos. She shares custody of her son with former boyfriend and actor Dean Cain.

== See also ==
- List of people in Playboy 1990–1999

Melissa Holliday	Lisa Marie Scott	Stacy Sanches	Danelle Folta	Cynthia Gwyn Brown	Rhonda Adams
Heidi Mark	Rachel Jeán Marteen	Donna D'Errico	Alicia Rickter	Holly Witt	Samantha Torres
