= List of Playboy Playmates of 1992 =

The following is a list of Playboy Playmates of 1992. Playboy magazine names its Playmate of the Month each month throughout the year.

== January ==
Suzi Simpson

Personal details
- Born: November 16, 1968 (age 57) Athens, Greece
- Height: 5 ft 5 in (1.65 m)

Suzi Athena Simpson (born Suzi Singstock on November 16, 1968) is an American model, and actress.

Born to a Naval officer and flight attendant in Athens, Greece, Suzi is the eldest of four children. She has two brothers and a sister. In 1984, she won the title Miss District of Columbia Teen USA. She appeared in a Michael Jackson Pepsi commercial, and films such as St. Elmo's Fire and Men at Work.

She was chosen as Playboy's Playmate of the Month for January, 1992 and has appeared in Playboy videos.

== February ==
Tanya Beyer

Personal details
- Born: June 4, 1971 (age 54) St. Paul, Minnesota, U.S.
- Height: 5 ft 8.5 in (1.74 m)

Tanya Michelle Beyer (born June 4, 1971, in St. Paul, Minnesota) is an American model and actress. She was chosen as Playboy's Playmate of the Month for February 1992 and has appeared in numerous Playboy videos.

== March ==
Tylyn John
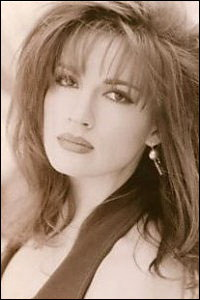

Personal details
- Born: July 31, 1966 (age 59) Encino, California, U.S.
- Height: 5 ft 6 in (1.68 m)

Tylyn John (born July 31, 1966, in Encino, California) is an American model and actress. She was chosen as Playboy's Playmate of the Month for March 1992. A scleroderma patient, she has retired from modeling and now works with various non-profit organizations to promote animal rights and prevent animal cruelty.

== April ==
Cady Cantrell

Personal details
- Born: September 12, 1972 (age 53) Lanett, Alabama, U.S.
- Height: 5 ft 7 in (1.70 m)

Cady Cantrell (born September 12, 1972, in Lanett, Alabama) is an American model. She was chosen as Playboy's Playmate of the Month in April 1992 and has appeared in Playboy videos.

== May ==
Anna Nicole Smith
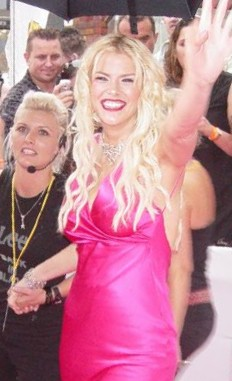

Playboy Playmate of the Year
- 1993
- Preceded by: Corinna Harney
- Succeeded by: Jenny McCarthy

Personal details
- Born: Vickie Lynn Marshall; November 28, 1967 Houston, Texas, U.S.
- Died: February 8, 2007 (aged 39) Hollywood, Florida, U.S.
- Height: 5 ft 11 in (1.80 m)

Vickie Lynn Marshall (November 28, 1967 – February 8, 2007), better known under the stage name of Anna Nicole Smith, was an American model, sex symbol, actress and television personality. She first gained popularity in Playboy as the May 1992 Playmate of the Month and then as the 1993 Playmate of the Year. She modeled for clothing companies, including Guess jeans and Lane Bryant. She also starred in her own reality TV show, The Anna Nicole Show.

Born and raised in Texas, Smith dropped out of high school and was married at the age of 17. Her highly publicized second marriage to oil business executive and business tycoon J. Howard Marshall, 63 years her senior, resulted in speculation that she married the octogenarian for his money, which she denied. Following his death, she began a lengthy legal battle over a share of his estate; her case, Marshall v. Marshall, reached the U.S. Supreme Court on a question of federal jurisdiction.

She died at age 39, as a result of an accidental overdose of prescription drugs. In the months before her death, she was the focus of renewed press coverage surrounding the death of her son, Daniel Smith, and the paternity and custody battle over her daughter Dannielynn.

== June ==
Angela Melini

Personal details
- Born: July 25, 1969 (age 56) Saigon, South Vietnam
- Height: 5 ft 6 in (1.68 m)

Angela Jane Melini (born July 25, 1969, in Saigon, Vietnam) is an American model and actress. Melini was selected as Playmate of the Month for the June, 1992 issue of Playboy magazine, and her centerfold was photographed by Arny Freytag. Over the next decade, Melini appeared in videos and as a promotional model and feature reporter for the Playboy Channel.

== July ==
Amanda Hope

Personal details
- Born: August 23, 1969 (age 56) Austin, Texas, U.S.
- Height: 5 ft 8 in (1.73 m)

Amanda Hope (born Amanda Hope Crouch, August 23, 1969) is an American model and actress. She was chosen as Playboy magazine's Playmate of the Month for July, 1992 and has appeared in some Playboy videos.

Prior to her appearance in Playboy, she served two tours in the U.S. Army as a clarinet player. She was stationed at Fort Hood, Texas, with the 2d Armored Division and in Bad Kreuznach, Germany, with the 8th Infantry Division.

== August ==
Ashley Allen

Personal details
- Born: February 7, 1968 (age 57) San Antonio, Texas, U.S.
- Height: 5 ft 8.5 in (1.74 m)

Ashley Allen (born February 7, 1968, in San Antonio) is an American model and actress. She was chosen as Playboy magazine's Playmate of the Month for August 1992 and has appeared in numerous Playboy videos.

In 1996 she made appearances for the entertainment company WWE.

== September ==
Morena Corwin

Personal details
- Born: October 24, 1969 (age 56) Seoul, South Korea
- Height: 5 ft 8.5 in (1.74 m)

Morena Corwin (born October 24, 1969) is a Korean-American adult model. She was chosen as Playboy's Playmate of the Month in September 1992 and has appeared in numerous Playboy videos. Corwin was also the main spokesmodel for Venus Swimwear and a former Hooters waitress. She has appeared in calendars and trading cards for the restaurant franchise.

== October ==
Tiffany Sloan

Personal details
- Born: May 29, 1973 Orange County, California, U.S.
- Died: November 1, 2008 (aged 35) Las Vegas, Nevada, U.S.
- Height: 5 ft 6 in (1.68 m)

Tiffany Marie Sloan (May 29, 1973 – November 1, 2008) was an American model and actress. She was chosen as Playboy's Playmate of the Month in October 1992. Sloan was one of only a handful of Playboy Playmates to have her video centerfold (1992) mass-marketed on VHS separately by Playboy, rather than as part of a compilation of Playmate of the Month video centerfolds. Her Playmate debut led to her appearance in an episode of Married... with Children.

== November ==
Stephanie Adams
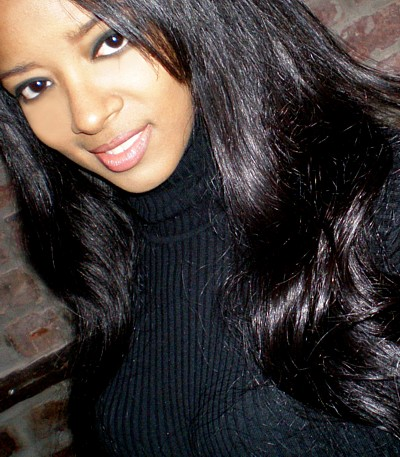

Personal details
- Born: July 24, 1970 Orange, New Jersey, U.S.
- Died: May 17, 2018 (age 47)
- Height: 5 ft 9 in (1.75 m)

Stephanie Adams (July 24, 1970 – May 17, 2018) was an American model and author. She was chosen as Playboy's Playmate of the Month for November 1992 and appeared in numerous Playboy videos.

== December ==
Barbara Moore
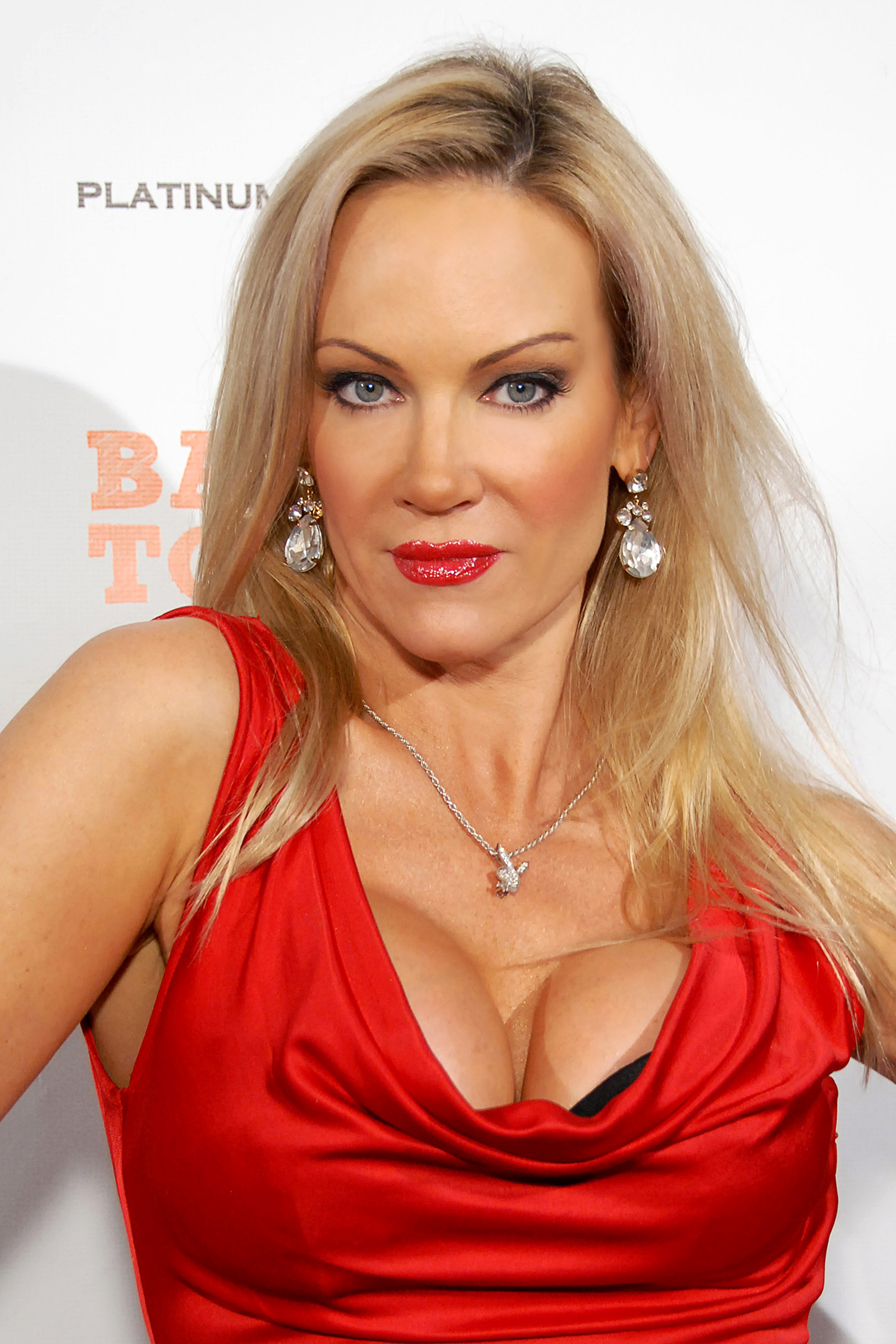
- Barbara Moore, Beverly Hills, California, on December 1, 2012

Personal details
- Born: August 21, 1968 (age 57) Spokane, Washington, U.S.
- Height: 5 ft 6 in (1.68 m)

Barbara Moore (born August 21, 1968, in Spokane, Washington) is an American glamour model, television and feature film actress and professional ballroom dancer and instructor.

She was chosen as Playboy's Playmate of the Month for December 1992 and has appeared in Playboy videos. Moore went on to serve as a Playboy ambassador for several years.

Among her television credits, she had a role as a lifeguard in the widely popular Primetime hit Baywatch, which is now in syndication.

Her film credits include a role as a fembot in an installment of the blockbuster hit and feature film franchise Austin Powers: International Man of Mystery. As a professional dancer, she was twice named as a U.S. National Pro-Am Ballroom Dance Champion. In February 2018, she was recruited to serve as chief branding officer for Playmates for a Peaceable Planet.

== See also ==
- List of people in Playboy 1990–1999

Suzi Simpson	Tanya Beyer	Tylyn John	Cady Cantrell	Anna Nicole Smith	Angela Melini
Amanda Hope	Ashley Allen	Morena Corwin	Tiffany Sloan	Stephanie Adams	Barbara Moore
