= List of Playboy Playmates of 1998 =

The following is a list of Playboy Playmates of 1998. Playboy magazine names their Playmate of the Month each month throughout the year.

== January ==
Heather Kozar
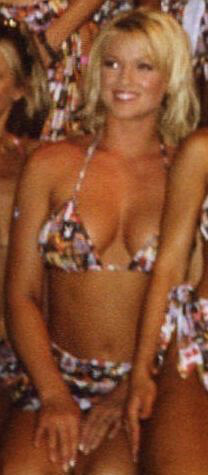
- Kozar at the 2000 Playboy Wet and Wild Bikini Fashion Show

Playboy Playmate of the Year
- 1999
- Preceded by: Karen McDougal
- Succeeded by: Jodi Ann Paterson

Personal details
- Born: May 4, 1976 (age 50) Akron, Ohio, U.S.
- Height: 5 ft 8 in (1.73 m)

Heather Kozar (born May 4, 1976) is an American model known as Playboy's Playmate of the Month for January 1998. She appeared on the cover of the June 1999 issue of the magazine, and was voted Playmate of the Year for 1999. Her original centerfold was photographed by Richard Fegley. She was also the St Pauli Girl for 2002.

== February ==
Julia Schultz

Personal details
- Born: June 15, 1979 (age 47) San Diego, California, U.S.
- Height: 5 ft 9 in (1.75 m)

Julia Schultz (born June 15, 1979) is an American model and actress. She is the Playmate of the Month for February 1998. Prior to that she was also a Perfect 10 model. She has also had several minor roles in films. She married major league baseball player Brett Tomko in November 2003.

== March ==
Marliece Andrada

Personal details
- Born: August 22, 1972 (age 53) Manteca, California, U.S.
- Height: 5 ft 7 in (1.70 m)

Marliece Andrada (born August 22, 1972 in Manteca, California) is Playboy's Playmate of the Month for March 1998 and has appeared in numerous Playboy videos. She joined the cast of Baywatch in the 1997 season; her pictorial was partially shot on the show's location. She later played Agent Xtra in the 1999 video game Gex: Deep Cover Gecko.

== April ==
Holly Joan Hart

Personal details
- Born: November 10, 1976 (age 49) Fort Hood, Texas, U.S.
- Height: 5 ft 7.5 in (1.71 m)

Holly Joan Hart (born November 10, 1976, in Fort Hood, Texas) is Playboy magazine's Playmate of the Month for April 1998. She has also appeared in a number of Playboy videos.

== May ==
Deanna Brooks

Personal details
- Born: April 30, 1974 (age 52) Boulder City, Nevada, U.S.
- Height: 5 ft 4.5 in (1.64 m)

Deanna Brooks (born Deanna Wilson on April 30, 1974, in Boulder City, Nevada) is an American glamour model and actress who is Playboy magazine's Playmate of the Month for May, 1998. She was a bank teller for Key Bank before her Playboy appearance. She was also photographed by celebrity photographer William Shatner for the Cyber Club in 2004.

== June ==
Maria Luisa Gil

Personal details
- Born: December 16, 1977 (age 48) Cuba
- Height: 5 ft 8 in (1.73 m)

María Luisa Gil (born December 16, 1977) is a Cuban model and actress. She was chosen as Playboy's Playmate of the Month in June, 1998.

== July ==
Lisa Dergan

Personal details
- Born: August 10, 1970 (age 55) Corpus Christi, Texas, U.S.
- Height: 5 ft 8.5 in (1.74 m)

Lisa Dergan (born August 10, 1970, in Corpus Christi, Texas) is an American model, actress, media personality and sportscaster. She is Playboy's Playmate of the Month for July 1998.

== August ==
Angela Little

Personal details
- Born: July 22, 1972 (age 53) Albertville, Alabama, U.S.
- Height: 5 ft 2.5 in (1.59 m)

Angela Little (born July 22, 1972) is an American model and actress. She is Playboys Playmate of the Month for August 1998, and she has appeared in several Playboy videos and special editions, working steadily for Playboy for more than five years following her centerfold appearance.

== September ==
Vanessa Gleason

Personal details
- Born: August 31, 1979 (age 46) San Diego, California, U.S.
- Height: 5 ft 5 in (1.65 m)

Vanessa Gleason (born August 31, 1979; San Diego, California) is an American model and actress. She is Playboy Playmate of the Month for September 1998.

== October ==
Laura Cover

Personal details
- Born: May 6, 1977 (age 49) Bucyrus, Ohio, U.S.
- Height: 5 ft 5 in (1.65 m)

Laura Cover (born May 6, 1977, in Bucyrus, Ohio) is an American model and actress. She is Playboys Playmate of the Month for October 1998, and has appeared in numerous Playboy videos. Her centerfold was photographed by Arny Freytag. She is married to New York Yankees manager Aaron Boone.

== November ==
Tiffany Taylor
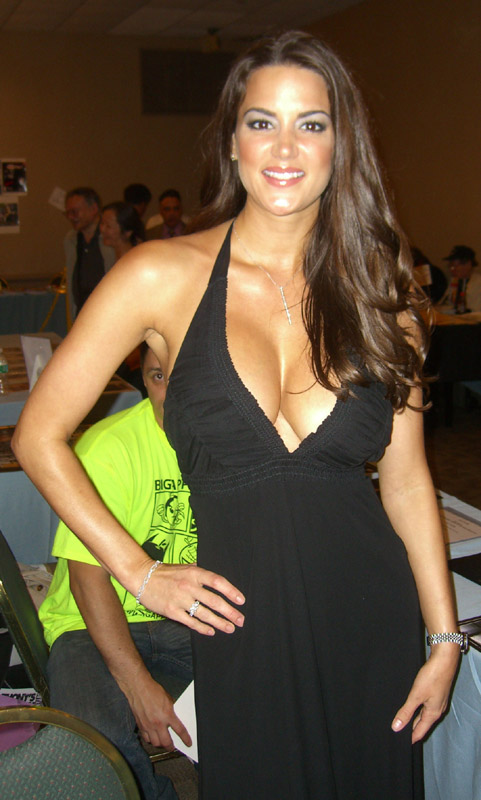
- Taylor at the Big Apple Summer Sizzler in Manhattan, June 2009
- Born: July 17, 1977 (age 49); Leesburg, Virginia, U.S.

Personal details
- Height: 5 ft 7 in (1.70 m)

Signature
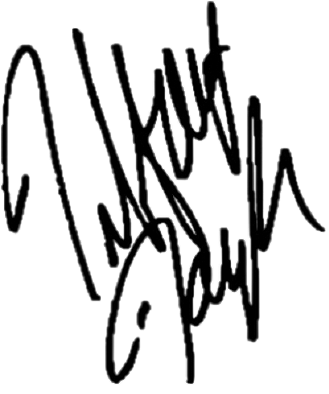

Tiffany Taylor (born July 17, 1977) is an American nude model, best known for her many appearances in Playboy. She was Playboy's Playmate of the Month for November 1998.

She had a small part in the third season of the HBO series True Blood in the episode "Everything is Broken" playing a human feeder for the Vampire League spokesperson.

In 2019, she played a peripheral role in a murder case involving a businessman in Irvine, California. The murderer falsely used Taylor's name, photo, and likeness and claimed that his victim had eloped with her.

== December ==
Nicole, Erica, and Jaclyn Dahm
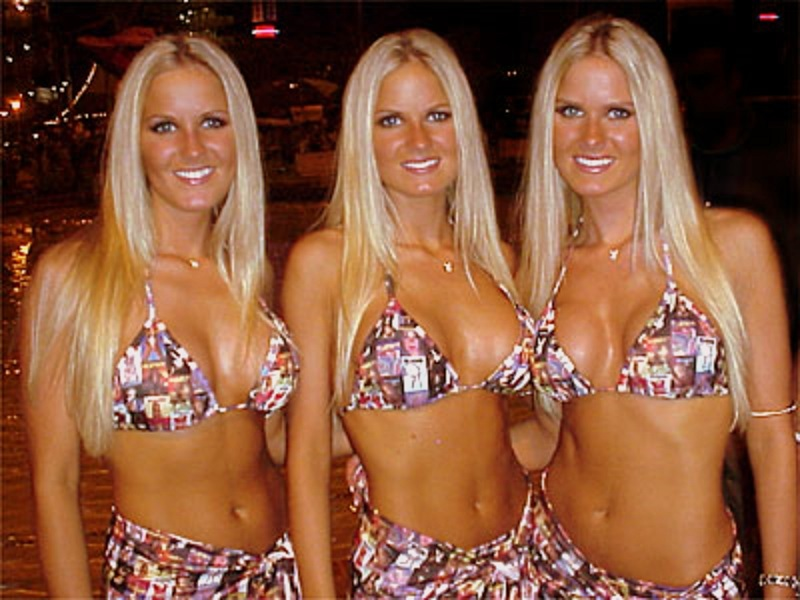
- Dahm triplets in 1998

Personal details
- Born: December 12, 1977 (age 48) Minneapolis, Minnesota, U.S.
- Height: 5 ft 8 in (1.73 m)

Nicole, Erica, and Jaclyn Dahm (born in that order on December 12, 1977, in Minneapolis, United States) are identical triplets. They are the Playmates in the December 1998 issue of Playboy magazine. According to an interview in their video centerfold, Nicole and Erica have tiny black ink dots (one and two dots, respectively) tattooed onto their buttocks, which their parents used to distinguish the three girls when they were babies.

They are the second set of triplets to be featured in the United States edition of Playboy, after "The Trio from Rio, The Amazing Brazilian Triplets" who were featured in the November 1993 issue. The Dahm sisters were featured in several issues of Playboy, but only appeared on one cover, that of Playboy Australia for June 1999.

== See also ==
- List of people in Playboy 1990–1999

Heather Kozar	Julia Schultz	Marliece Andrada	Holly Joan Hart	Deanna Brooks	Maria Luisa Gil
Lisa Dergan	Angela Little	Vanessa Gleason	Laura Cover	Tiffany Taylor	Dahm triplets
