= Stacy Arthur =

American model and actress (1968–2019)

Playboy centerfold appearance
- January 1991
- Preceded by: Morgan Fox
- Succeeded by: Cristy Thom

Personal details
- Born: Stacy Leigh Darland; June 4, 1968 Naperville, Illinois, U.S.
- Died: April 5, 2019 (aged 50)
- Height: 5 ft 7 in (1.70 m)

Stacy Leigh Arthur (née Darland, June 4, 1968 – April 5, 2019) was an American model and actress. She was chosen as Playboy's Playmate of the Month for January, 1991. In addition to her nude pictorial and centerfold in that issue, Arthur was featured on the cover, wearing a pageant-style banner that said "Miss January 1991." She continued working for Playboy, appearing in numerous Playboy videos.

== Biography ==
Stacy Leigh Darland was born in Naperville, Illinois on June 4, 1968.

Arthur won Mrs. Ohio in 1989 then went on to represent her state in the 1990 Mrs. America contest.

Arthur's 36-year-old husband, James Alan Arthur, was the victim of a murder-suicide by a fan named James Lindberg on October 29, 1991. Lindberg shot and killed him on a street in Bellefontaine, Ohio, where the family lived, and then killed himself. The event was the subject of the first episode of the first season of The Playboy Murders titled "All That Glitters" that aired January 30, 2023.

In 1992, Arthur filed a $70 million lawsuit against Playboy and others alleging she was raped and sodomized by three Playboy employees and that inaction by the magazine led to the death of her husband. She claimed two security guards and a butler drugged, then raped and sodomized her on October 6, 1991, at the Playboy Mansion.

Playboy severed its ties with Arthur after she appeared on two nationally televised shows where she publicly declared her rape at the Playboy Mansion. A deputy district attorney opined that there were too many inconsistencies in Arthur's statements while there were no inconsistencies in statements given by the three employees who claimed the sex was consensual. The employees who had engaged in sex with Arthur were fired because they violated company policy by having sex during working hours.

Arthur and her husband, James Arthur, had three children from prior marriages. She died on April 5, 2019, at the age of 50.

== See also ==
- List of Playboy Playmates of the Month

Stacy Arthur	Cristy Thom	Julie Clarke	Christina Leardini	Carrie Yazel	Saskia Linssen
Wendy Kaye	Corinna Harney	Samantha Dorman	Cheryl Bachman	Tonja Christensen	Wendy Hamilton
