= Jennifer Lyn Jackson =

American playboy playmate (1969–2010)

Playboy centerfold appearance
- April 1989
- Preceded by: Laurie Wood
- Succeeded by: Monique Noel

Personal details
- Born: March 21, 1969 Cleveland, Ohio
- Died: January 22, 2010 (aged 40) Westlake, Ohio
- Height: 5 ft 7 in (1.70 m)

Jennifer Lyn Jackson (March 21, 1969 – January 22, 2010) of Cleveland, Ohio, was the Playboy magazine Playmate of the Month for April 1989. Jackson was also one of three finalists chosen for Playboy's 35th Anniversary Playmate. Outtakes from her Playmate pictorial, which was photographed by Arny Freytag, appeared in Playboy Special Edition several times following her centerfold appearance.

Jackson graduated from North Olmsted High School in 1986, and went on to study business and finance at Kent State University.

In January 2007, Jackson was arrested in Oberlin, Ohio, for driving under the influence (DUI), and police found open beer bottles, marijuana, and stolen tobacco products in her car. In a plea bargain, she pleaded guilty to DUI and the other criminal charges were dropped. She was given a suspended sentence of 180 days in jail, fined $500, placed on probation for three years, and had her driver's license suspended for six months. She was also ordered to receive a period of drug and alcohol abuse counseling.

A long time drug addict, on January 22, 2010, Jackson was found dead from a heroin overdose by her husband, James Thompson, in their trailer park home in Westlake, Ohio.

== See also ==
- List of Playboy Playmates of 1989
- List of people in Playboy 1980–1989

Fawna MacLaren	Simone Eden	Laurie Wood	Jennifer Lyn Jackson	Monique Noel	Tawnni Cable
Erika Eleniak	Gianna Amore	Karin and Mirjam van Breeschooten	Karen Foster	Renee Tenison	Petra Verkaik
