= Jennifer Rovero =

American actor-model (born 1978)

Playboy centerfold appearance
- July 1999
- Preceded by: Kimberly Spicer
- Succeeded by: Rebecca Scott

Personal details
- Born: December 12, 1978 (age 46); Austin, Texas
- Height: 5 ft 8 in (1.73 m)

Jennifer Rovero (born December 12, 1978) is Playboy's Playmate of the Month for July 1999 and has appeared in numerous Playboy videos. She appeared as the cover model of the October 1999 edition.

== Early years ==
Jennifer Rovero was born in Austin, Texas, but during her childhood, she and her younger sister, Jamie, lived in Texas, California and Florida. Most of her time was eventually spent in Jacksonville, Florida, where she graduated from Mandarin High School in 1997.

== Modeling ==
Rovero entered and won the 1998 Miss Fiesta Playera pageant in Jacksonville Beach, which gave her the confidence to compete in Hawaiian Tropic swimsuit contests around the country. At the Hawaiian Tropic contest in Las Vegas, she was talking to photographer Arny Freytag. Rovero suggested that the beautiful countryside in Venezuela would be a nice place for a Hawaiian Tropic shoot. She was familiar with the country because her father, Raimundo, was a Venezuelan citizen and lived there. Freytag, besides being a respected swimsuit photographer, had taken over 100 centerfold photos for Playboy since 1975. Freytag suggested that he take pictures of her in Venezuela.

== Playboy ==
The pictures were taken and forwarded to Playboy. The magazine requested a second test shoot, which was provided. On Independence Day in 1998, Rovero met publisher Hugh Hefner at The Playboy Mansion.

Her centerfold spread was shot in October, 1998 in California and contained 20-pictures. Rovero had no objections to nudity. Her mother, Leslie, was quoted that she raised both her daughters to be open minded about such things. The only real problem came when the photographers asked her to pose with a cat. Rovero has a feline allergy, and within 30 minutes her face was red and puffy, causing the session to be canceled.

== Personal ==
Rovero has called herself Forrest Gump because she kept finding herself in interesting situations.

Rovero was a photographer working for Paris Hilton in June, 2010. She attended the 2010 FIFA World Cup Soccer in South Africa with Hilton where they both stepped outside the stadium to smoke a marijuana cigarette. Consequently, she was arrested and pleaded guilty to the charge. She was sentenced to a R1000 fine (US$130) or 30 days in prison, and given 14 days to leave the country or face deportation. Her name will be placed on a visa and entry stop list.

Jaime Bergman	Stacy Marie Fuson	Alexandria Karlsen	Natalia Sokolova	Tishara Cousino	Kimberly Spicer
Jennifer Rovero	Rebecca Scott	Kristi Cline	Jodi Ann Paterson	Cara Wakelin	Brooke Richards
