= List of Playboy Playmates of 1991 =

The following is a list of Playboy Playmates of 1991. Playboy magazine names its Playmate of the Month each month throughout the year.

== January ==
Stacy Arthur

Personal details
- Born: June 4, 1968 Naperville, Illinois, U.S.
- Died: April 5, 2019 (aged 50)
- Height: 5 ft 7 in (1.70 m)

Stacy Leigh Arthur (June 4, 1968 – April 5, 2019, in Naperville, Illinois) was an American model and actress. She was chosen as Playboy's Playmate of the Month for January, 1991. Arthur was also Mrs. Ohio for the 1990 Mrs. America contest.

Arthur's husband, Jim, was the victim of a murder-suicide by a fan named James Lindberg, shortly after Stacy's appearance in Playboy.

== February ==
Cristy Thom

Personal details
- Born: September 8, 1971 (age 54) Los Angeles, California, U.S.
- Height: 5 ft 6 in (1.68 m)

Cristy Thom (born September 8, 1971, in Los Angeles, also known as Li-Wah Thom) is an American realist painter, model and actress. She was chosen as Playboy's Playmate of the Month for February 1991 and has appeared in numerous Playboy videos. Thom was also chosen as the Playmate of the Year in 1992 for the Dutch edition of Playboy. She studied at Otis College of Art and Design and is an artist who paints usually in a photorealist style. Her work has been exhibited at MOCA Los Angeles and the Anchorage Museum, Anchorage, Ak.

== March ==
Julie Clarke

Personal details
- Born: August 11, 1971 (age 54) Tucson, Arizona, U.S.
- Height: 5 ft 5 in (1.65 m)

Julie Anne Clarke (born August 11, 1971 in Tucson, Arizona) is an American model and actress. Julie was selected as Playboy magazine's Playmate of the Month for March 1991, and she appeared on the cover of the April 1991 issue.

== April ==
Christina Leardini

Personal details
- Born: January 22, 1969 (age 57) St. Petersburg, Florida, U.S.
- Height: 5 ft 8 in (1.73 m)

Christina Marie Leardini (aka Christina Herbert, born January 22, 1969, in St. Petersburg, Florida) is an American glamour model and actress. She was chosen as Playmate of the Month by Playboy magazine for April, 1991. She was a regular Playboy Newsstand Specials model for about five years after her playmate pictorial.

== May ==
Carrie Yazel

Personal details
- Born: November 30, 1969 (age 56) Huntington Beach, California, U.S.
- Height: 5 ft 8 in (1.73 m)

Carrie Jean Yazel (born November 30, 1969) is an American model and actress. She was chosen as Playboy's Playmate of the Month for May, 1991. Her centerfold was photographed by Stephen Wayda.

== June ==
Saskia Linssen

Personal details
- Born: 16 February 1970 (age 56) Venlo, Netherlands
- Height: 5 ft 9 in (1.75 m)

Saskia Linssen (born 16 February 1970 in Venlo) is a Dutch model and actress. She was chosen as Playboy's Playmate of the Month for June, 1991.

== July ==
Wendy Kaye

Personal details
- Born: May 5, 1972 (age 54) Memphis, Tennessee, U.S.
- Height: 5 ft 6 in (1.68 m)

Wendy Kaye (born May 5, 1972) is an American model and actress. She was chosen as Playboy's Playmate of the Month for July, 1991 and has appeared in numerous Playboy videos. She also appeared on the cover of the April 1992 issue of the magazine.

== August ==
Corinna Harney
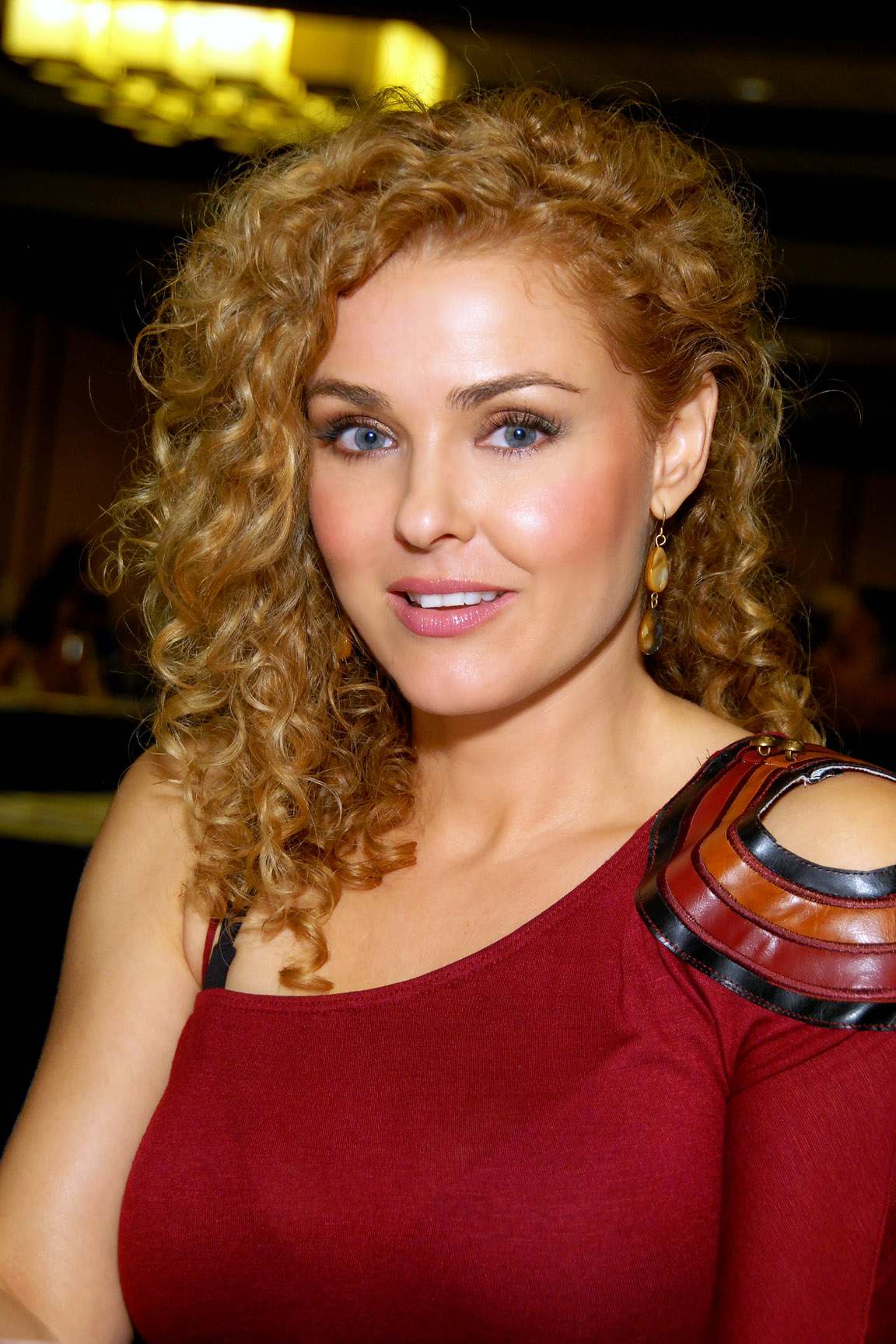
- Corinna Harney, Los Angeles, California on October 1, 2011

Playboy Playmate of the Year
- 1992
- Preceded by: Lisa Matthews
- Succeeded by: Anna Nicole Smith

Personal details
- Born: February 20, 1972 (age 54) Bremerhaven, Germany
- Height: 5 ft 3 in (1.60 m)

Corinna Harney (born February 20, 1972) is an American model and actress. She was chosen as Playboy's Playmate of the Month for August, 1991 and Playboy's Playmate of the Year 1992. Harney is sometimes credited as Corina Harney, Corinna Harney-Jones, or Corinna Harney Jones.

== September ==
Samantha Dorman

Personal details
- Born: March 21, 1968 (age 58) Lakeland, Florida, U.S.
- Height: 5 ft 10 in (1.78 m)

Samantha Leah Dorman is an American model and actress. She was chosen as Playboy's Playmate of the Month for September 1991 and has appeared in numerous Playboy videos. Prior to being a playmate, she appeared on the cover of the July 1991 issue of the magazine. She appeared in an episode of Seinfeld.

== October ==
Cheryl Bachman
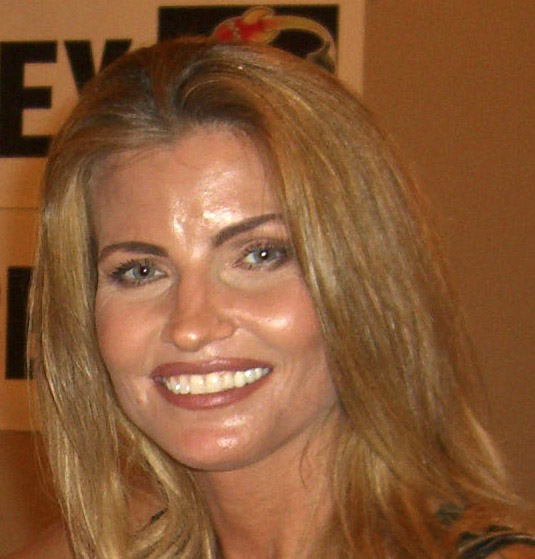
- Bachman at the Big Apple Con, June 13, 2009

Personal details
- Born: November 27, 1969 (age 56) Jacksonville, Florida, U.S.
- Height: 5 ft 6 in (1.68 m)

Cheryl Bachman (born November 27, 1969) is an American model and actress. She was chosen as Playboy's Playmate of the Month for October 1991, photographed by Arny Freytag and Stephen Wayda. She also appeared in a group shot on the cover of Playboy for October 1993 and a July 1993 ensemble pictorial, "Lucky Stiff", which was photographed by Stephen Wayda.

== November ==
Tonja Christensen

Personal details
- Born: September 3, 1971 (age 54) Salt Lake City, Utah, U.S.
- Height: 5 ft 7 in (1.70 m)

Tonja Marie Christensen (born September 3, 1971) is an American model and actress. She was chosen as Playboy's Playmate of the Month for November 1991. She also appeared on the cover of the April 1993 issue of the magazine.

== December ==
Wendy Hamilton

Personal details
- Born: December 20, 1967 (age 58) Detroit, Michigan, U.S.
- Height: 5 ft 10 in (1.78 m)

Wendy Hamilton (born December 20, 1967, in Detroit, Michigan) is an American model and actress. After working as a fashion model she was chosen as Playboy's Playmate of the Month for December, 1991 and has appeared in numerous Playboy videos. She also appeared in several movies in the early 1990s, such as "Midnight Temptations", released on 11 February 1995.

== See also ==
- List of people in Playboy 1990–1999

Stacy Arthur	Cristy Thom	Julie Clarke	Christina Leardini	Carrie Yazel	Saskia Linssen
Wendy Kaye	Corinna Harney	Samantha Dorman	Cheryl Bachman	Tonja Christensen	Wendy Hamilton
