= List of Playboy Playmates of 1999 =

The following is a list of Playboy Playmates of 1999, the 45th anniversary year of the publication. Playboy magazine names its Playmate of the Month each month throughout the year.

== January ==
Jaime Bergman
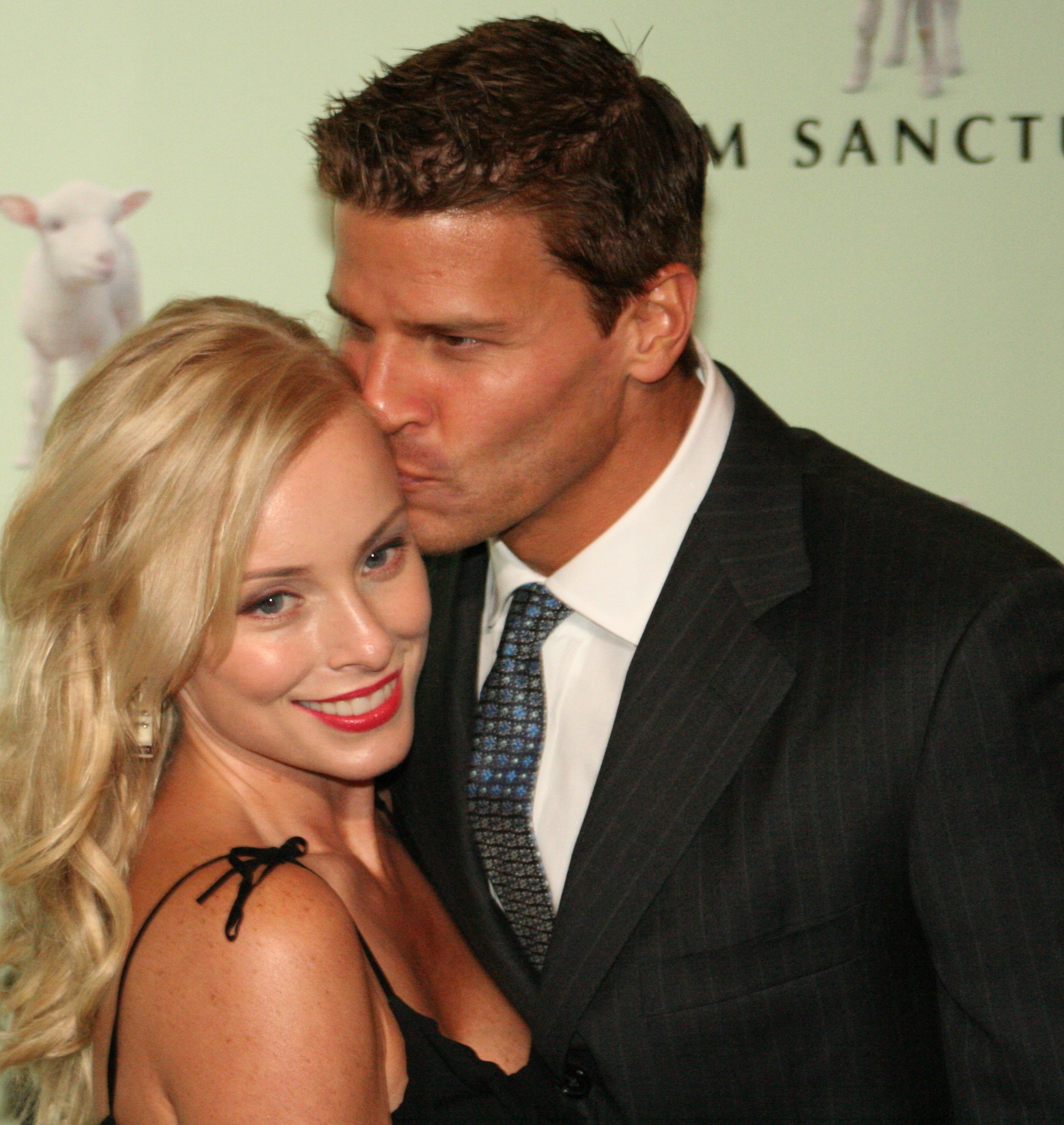
- Bergman with husband David Boreanaz

Personal details
- Born: September 23, 1975 (age 51) Salt Lake City, Utah, U.S.
- Height: 5 ft 5 in (1.65 m)

Jaime Bergman (born September 23, 1975, in Salt Lake City, United States) is an American model and actress who is Playboy magazine's Playmate of the Month for January 1999, its 45th Anniversary issue. In addition to her magazine appearance she has appeared in several Playboy videos. Her centerfold was photographed by Stephen Wayda.

== February ==
Stacy Fuson

Personal details
- Born: August 30, 1978 (age 48) Tacoma, Washington, U.S.
- Height: 5 ft 9 in (1.75 m)

Stacy Marie Fuson (born August 30, 1978, in Tacoma, Washington) is an American model. Before she modeled for Playboy, she worked as a model in Los Angeles, California. She also worked at The Limited. She is Playboy's Playmate of the Month for February 1999. Her centerfold was photographed by Arny Freytag. In 2002, she continued working for Playboy, serving on their Xtreme Team. She was the 2005 St. Pauli Girl. That same year she made an appearance in the 11th episode of Entourage.

== March ==
Lexie Karlsen
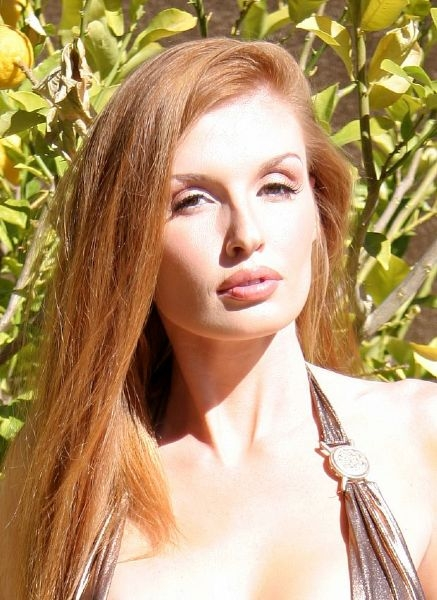

Personal details
- Born: October 26, 1978 (age 48) Mesa, Arizona, U.S.
- Height: 5 ft 7 in (1.70 m)

Alexandria "Lexie" Karlsen (born October 26, 1978) is an American model, actress and author. She is the daughter of Thomas Karlsen, long-time Campaign Treasurer for Arizona Senator Dennis DeConcini.

Karlsen is Playboy's Playmate of the Month for March 1999, photographed by Arny Freytag and Stephen Wayda. Karlsen appeared in Playboy videos and special editions following her centerfold appearance. She appeared in Penthouse as its Pet of the Month for July 2006, making her only the third model to appear as both a Playmate and a Pet.

== April ==
Natalia Sokolova

Personal details
- Born: October 15, 1976 (age 50) Moscow, Soviet Union, now Russia
- Height: 5 ft 11 in (1.80 m)

Natalia Sokolova is a model and actress. She is Playboy's Playmate of the Month for April 1999. Now she is a founder of SGG World LLC (www.sggworld.com)

== May ==
Tishara Cousino
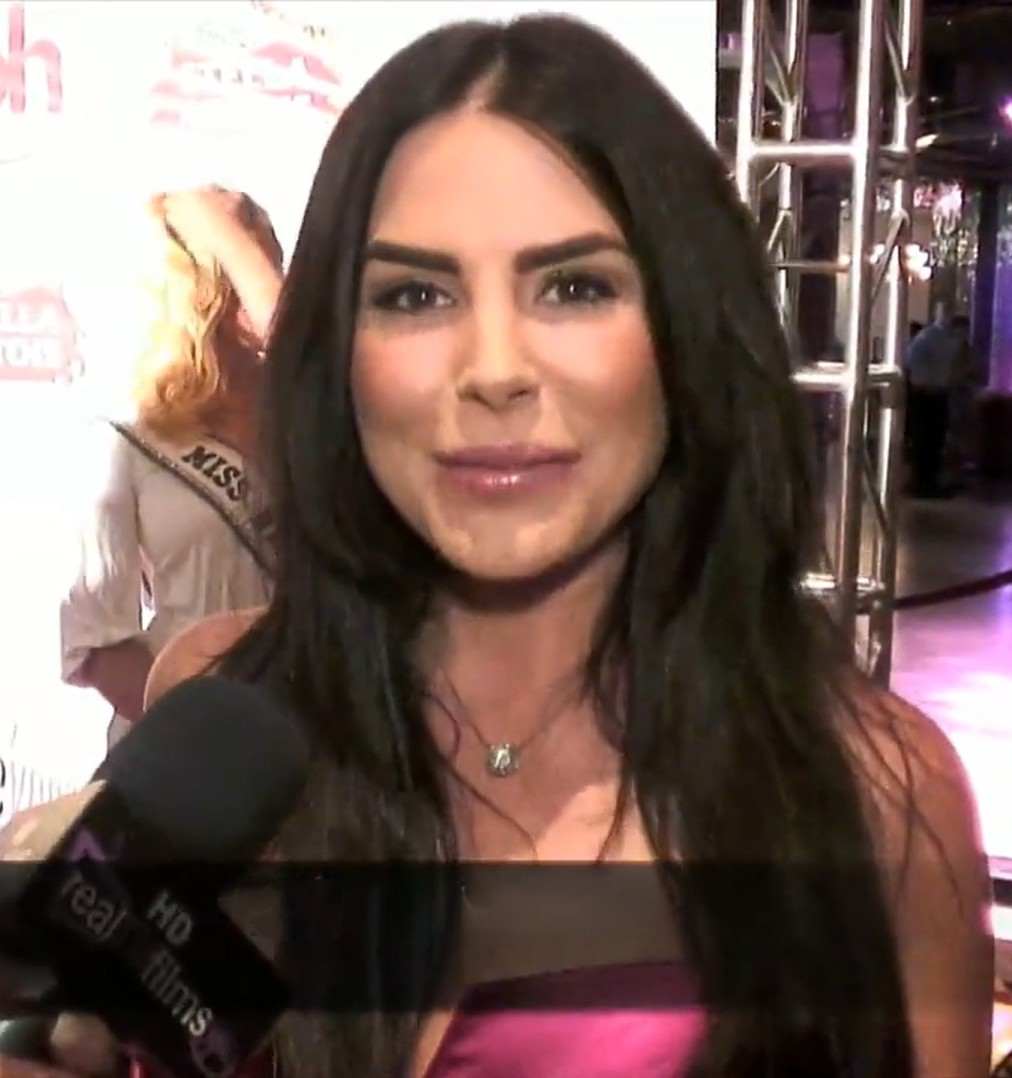
- Cousino in 2009

Personal details
- Born: June 16, 1978 (age 48) Las Vegas, Nevada, U.S.
- Height: 5 ft 7 in (1.70 m)

Tishara Lee Cousino (born June 16, 1978) is an American model and sometime actress. She is Playmate of the Month for the May 1999 issue of Playboy magazine, and her centerfold was photographed by Arny Freytag. Cousino has appeared in several Playboy newsstand special editions and videos, working steadily for Playboy for approximately five years after her Playmate appearance.

== June ==
Kimberly Spicer
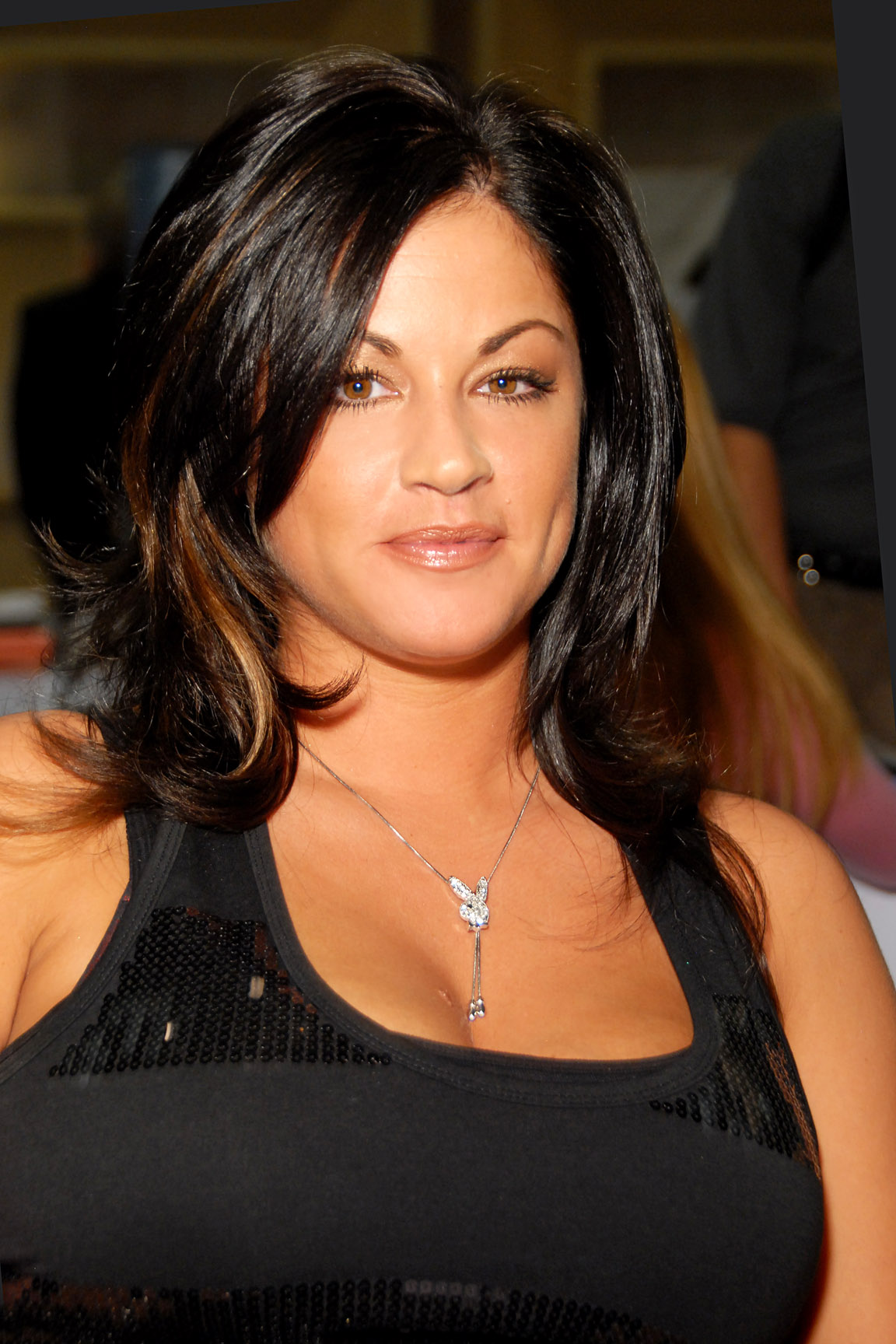
- Kimberly Spicer, Long Beach, California on November 5, 2011

Personal details
- Born: January 17, 1980 (age 46) Detroit, Michigan, U.S.
- Height: 5 ft 6 in (1.68 m)

Kimberly A. Spicer (born January 17, 1980) is an American model and actress. She is Playboy's Playmate of the Month for June, 1999 and has appeared in numerous Playboy videos. Spicer was the first Playmate to have been born in the 1980s.

== July ==
Jennifer Rovero

Personal details
- Born: December 12, 1978 (age 47) Austin, Texas, U.S.
- Height: 5 ft 8 in (1.73 m)

Jennifer Rovero (born December 12, 1978, in Austin, Texas) is a Venezuelan American model Playboy's Playmate of the Month for July 1999, and has appeared in numerous Playboy videos. She appeared as the cover model of the October 1999 edition.

== August ==
Rebecca Scott
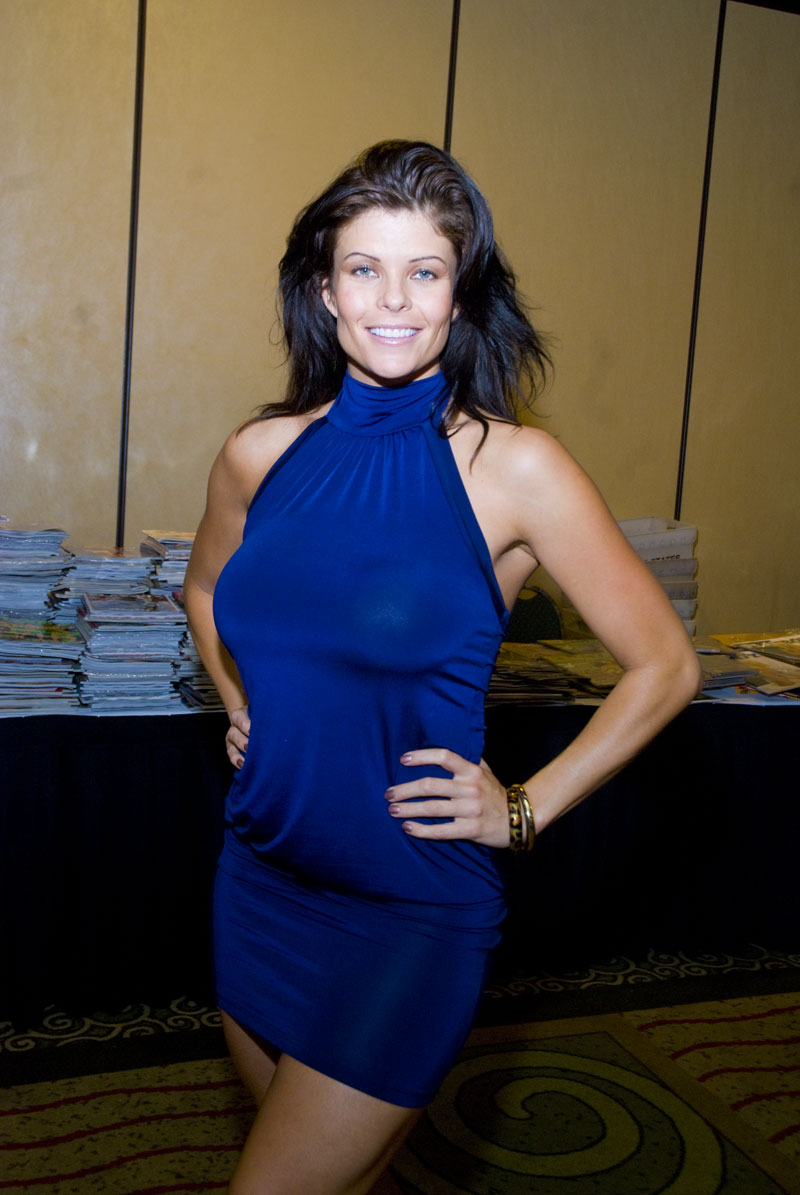
- Rebecca Scott

Personal details
- Born: September 27, 1972 (age 54) Kenosha, Wisconsin, U.S.
- Height: 5 ft 8 in (1.73 m)

Rebecca Scott (born September 27, 1972, in Kenosha, Wisconsin) is an American model who is Playboy magazine's Playmate of the Month for August 1999. Playboy described her as an "Anna Nicole Smith look-alike", upon her appearance as centerfold. Also, she appeared in several of its Playboy videos, including one in which she made an extended singing performance: 2001 Video Playmate Calendar, 1999 Playmate Erotic Adventures, and Playboy: Club Lingerie (2000).

== September ==
Kristi Cline

Personal details
- Born: May 4, 1980 (age 46) Lubbock, Texas, U.S.
- Height: 5 ft 8 in (1.73 m)

Kristi Cline (born May 4, 1980) is an American model and actress. She is Playboy's Playmate of the Month for September 1999, and has appeared in numerous Playboy videos.

== October ==
Jodi Ann Paterson

Playboy Playmate of the Year
- 2000
- Preceded by: Heather Kozar
- Succeeded by: Brande Roderick

Personal details
- Born: July 31, 1975 (age 51) Balikpapan, Indonesia
- Height: 5 ft 5 in (1.65 m)

Jodi Ann Paterson (born July 31, 1975) is an American model, actress and former beauty queen. She competed in the Miss Teen USA competition as Miss Oregon Teen USA in 1994. She's Playmate of the Month for October 1999, and was named 2000's Playmate of the Year.

Paterson married auto racer Michael Andretti on October 7, 2006.

== November ==
Cara Wakelin

Personal details
- Born: February 8, 1977 (age 49) Melbourne, Australia
- Height: 5 ft 5 in (1.65 m)

Cara Wakelin (born February 8, 1977) is a Canadian model and actress.

Wakelin was born in Melbourne in 1977. She was born a triplet; however, one of the babies died, leaving Wakelin and her brother Bain as survivors. Wakelin has never met her birth father. The kids were raised by their single mother and the family relocated to Toronto, Ontario, Canada. Wakelin attended Etobicoke School of the Arts and described herself as an introvert. After high school, she attended McMaster University.

Wakelin read a copy of Playboy during the last semester of school. She read that Playboy was touring to find a "Millennium Playmate". In 1998, she auditioned for Playboy in Toronto. Her mother attended with her, supporting her decision. Wakelin was asked to do a test shoot in Chicago. She became Playboy's Playmate of the Month for November, 1999. Hugh Hefner put Wakelin on the cover of the Canadian Playboy edition, in which she wore a hockey jersey. Within two weeks the issue was sold out across Canada. She has appeared in numerous Playboy videos.

In 2002, Wakelin appeared in Death to Smoochy and Relic Hunter. Wakelin was on The Howard Stern Show in 2004. She appeared on the cover and as a model for June in the 2005 Playmates at Play at the Playboy Mansion swimsuit calendar. She has modeled for Coca-Cola, Miller Brewing Company and Budweiser. She lives in Los Angeles and Toronto.

== December ==
Brooke Richards

Personal details
- Born: October 17, 1976 (age 50) York, Pennsylvania, U.S.
- Height: 5 ft 7.5 in (1.71 m)

Brooke Richards (born October 17, 1976, in York, Pennsylvania) is an American model. She appeared in numerous Playboy Special Editions during 1998, on Playboy's cover and in a "Girls of Hawaiian Tropic" pictorial in July 1999, and ultimately as Playboy's Playmate of the Month for December, 1999. She has also appeared in Playboy videos. Her centerfold was photographed by Stephen Wayda.

== See also ==
- List of people in Playboy 1990–1999

| Jaime Bergman | Stacy Marie Fuson | Alexandria Karlsen | Natalia Sokolova | Tishara Cousino | Kimberly Spicer |
| Jennifer Rovero | Rebecca Scott | Kristi Cline | Jodi Ann Paterson | Cara Wakelin | Brooke Richards |
