= Jodi Ann Paterson =

Indonesian-born American actress and model (born 1975)

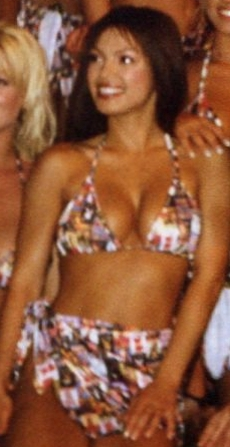
- Paterson at the 2000 Playboy Wet and Wild Bikini Fashion Show

Playboy centerfold appearance
- October 1999
- Preceded by: Kristi Cline
- Succeeded by: Cara Wakelin

Playboy Playmate of the Year
- 2000
- Preceded by: Heather Kozar
- Succeeded by: Brande Roderick

Personal details
- Born: Jodi Ann Paterson; July 31, 1975 (age 51) Balikpapan, East Kalimantan, Indonesia
- Height: 5 ft 5 in (1.65 m)

Jodi Ann Paterson (born July 31, 1975) is an American model, actress and former beauty queen. She competed in the Miss Teen USA competition as Miss Oregon Teen USA in 1994. She's Playmate of the Month for October 1999, and was later named 2000's Playmate of the Year. She has also modeled for Perfect 10. She is married to 1991 CART series champion and current IndyCar team owner Michael Andretti.

== Biography ==
Jodi Ann Paterson was born in Balikpapan, Indonesia, to an American father and an Indonesian mother. She moved to America with her parents during her childhood. Paterson, who attended Thurston High School, won the Miss Oregon Teen USA 1994 title and competed in the Miss Teen USA pageant. The event, which was televised live from Biloxi, Mississippi, was won by Shauna Gambill of California. After high school she attended Oregon State University (OSU), graduating in 1997. OSU was featured in both her October 1999 Playboy issue and Playmate of the Year Video Edition.

According to her PMOY video, she is the first Playmate of the Year to have a college degree.

She was selected to deliver opinions on VH1's The Greatest: 100 Hottest Hotties, along with Playmates the Dahm triplets.

The band Zebrahead wrote a song called "Playmate of the Year". Paterson is featured in the video, and the issue announcing her selection is delivered to the band's lead singer at the end. The music video is featured as a bonus segment of the Playboy 2001 Video Playmate Calendar which has Paterson on the cover. Paterson is also on the cover of Zebrahead’s album of the same name. The song was also featured in Dude, Where's My Car?, in which Paterson also had a small role as a man-eating giantess.

Paterson married auto racer Michael Andretti on October 7, 2006, in Napa, California.

== See also ==
- List of people in Playboy 2000–2009

Preceded by Jill Chartier	Miss Oregon Teen USA; 1993	Succeeded by Kirra O'Brien

Jaime Bergman	Stacy Marie Fuson	Alexandria Karlsen	Natalia Sokolova	Tishara Cousino	Kimberly Spicer
Jennifer Rovero	Rebecca Scott	Kristi Cline	Jodi Ann Paterson	Cara Wakelin	Brooke Richards
