= Rovero =

Rovero is a surname. Notable people with the surname include:

- Daniel Rovero (1937/1938–2025), American politician in Connecticut
- Jennifer Rovero (born 1978), American film actress and Playboy Playmate
- Paolo Vincenzo Rovero (died 1665), Roman Catholic bishop of Asti
