= Corinna Harney =

American model and actress

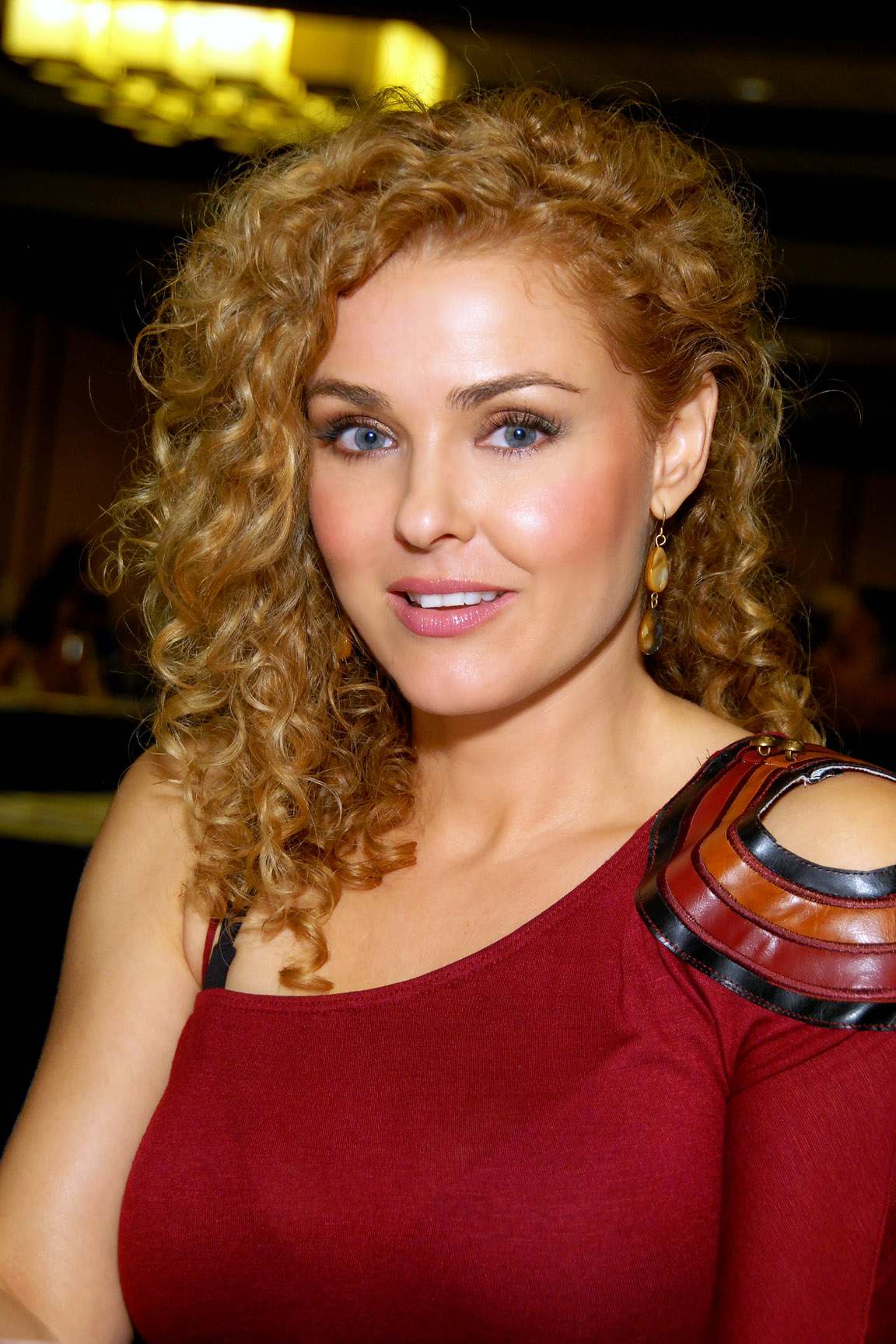
- Corinna Harney, Los Angeles, California on October 1, 2011

Playboy centerfold appearance
- August 1991
- Preceded by: Wendy Kaye
- Succeeded by: Samantha Dorman

Playboy Playmate of the Year
- 1992
- Preceded by: Lisa Matthews
- Succeeded by: Anna Nicole Smith

Personal details
- Born: February 20, 1972 (age 54) Bremerhaven, Bremen, West Germany
- Height: 5 ft 3 in (1.60 m)

Corinna Harney (born February 20, 1972) is an American model and actress. She was chosen as Playboy's Playmate of the Month for August 1991 and Playboy's Playmate of the Year for 1992. Harney is sometimes credited as Corina Harney, Corinna Harney-Jones, or Corinna Harney Jones.

== Career ==
Harney considers her start in the entertainment industry when she took her first ballet class at three years old. Her first acting job, when she was in the fourth grade, was with Dick Van Patten for a Blue Cross-Blue Shield commercial. She had also begun doing print modeling around that same time.

After her first appearance in Playboy, Harney was featured in a series of Playboy videos, as well as appearing in minor roles in television series such as Nash Bridges and CSI and the movie National Lampoon's Vegas Vacation.

After appearing in various roles, she and a friend produced a film called Pitcher and the Pin-up. Harney has worked on or had roles in a series of projects since, including a web-series called Wedded Bliss, a film called The Ivory Curse, a Sinclair Oil commercial, a movie called Ryder and Julina, and an independent film called Sins of our Youth, which also features Super 8 actor Joel Courtney.

== Personal life ==
Harney was born in Bremerhaven, West Germany. She is the sister of Dorinda Harney. Harney spent most of her childhood life in Las Vegas, Nevada, where her father was a state trooper for the Nevada Highway Patrol. Harney graduated from Bonanza High School in Las Vegas.

She now lives in the Los Angeles Area, but she also maintains a home in Las Vegas. Harney is married and has a daughter.

== Filmography ==
=== Feature films ===
- Pitcher and the Pin-up a.k.a. The Road Home (2003)
- Rat Race (2001) (as Corinna Harney Jones)
- Vegas Vacation (1997) (as Corinna Harney Jones)
- Vampirella (1996)

=== TV guest appearances ===
- CSI: Crime Scene Investigation playing "Girl Gone Wild" (as Corinna Harney Jones) in episode: "The Accused Is Entitled" (episode # 3.2) October 3, 2002
- Nash Bridges playing "Waitress" (as Corinna Harney-Jones) in episode: "Jackpot: Part 2" (episode # 5.22) May 19, 2000
- High Tide in episode: "Mermaid" (episode # 2.5) October 22, 1995
- Speeders on Tru TV

Stacy Arthur	Cristy Thom	Julie Clarke	Christina Leardini	Carrie Yazel	Saskia Linssen
Wendy Kaye	Corinna Harney	Samantha Dorman	Cheryl Bachman	Tonja Christensen	Wendy Hamilton
