= Miss Nude World =

An yearly international nudist beauty competition hosted in Ontario, Canada.

Miss Nude World was a yearly international beauty pageant for naturists that took place mostly throughout the 1970s and 1980s. The event, which was held at the Four Seasons Naturist Resort in Ontario, Canada, was a widely reported cultural flashpoint that reflected the postwar naturist movement, commercialized sexuality, and changing attitudes toward public nudity.

== History ==
Grover Allen, a businessman and entertainment promoter, founded the pageant in 1970. It appeared during a period of transition for the naturist movements in Canada and around the world, as the counterculture of the 1970s, which was more focused on pleasure and leisure, started to blend with traditional "sunbathing for health" philosophies.

Miss Nude World was created with the intention of drawing commercial and mainstream media attention, in contrast to traditional, strictly private nudist events. Thousands of spectators from North America and Europe attended the pageant, which was held at the Four Seasons Naturist Resort, a well-known nudist club in Canada.

Journalists, photographers, and television crews frequently covered the event in great detail, portraying it as a divisive spectacle. Although the pageant's organizers promoted it as a celebration of modern personal freedom and natural body acceptance, conservative organizations and elements of the traditional naturist movement frequently criticized it for commercializing and sexualizing nudism.

== Cultural impact ==
Miss Nude World is recognized by sociologists and historians of Canadian culture as a significant turning point in the relaxation of social taboos following World War II. Historian Mary-Ann Shantz devoted an entire chapter of her academic history of the movement to the event's analysis, pointing out that the pageant compelled a public negotiation over the limits of gender norms, commercial entrepreneurship, and public decency within spaces devoted to social nudity.

The pageant was held every year until the 1970s, when it began to lose popularity and media attention in the mid-to-late 1980s. As social environments changed and laws pertaining to adult entertainment changed, the pageant finally went out of business.

== Titleholders ==
The winners of the pageant, which took place every year from 1970 to the 1980s at the Four Seasons Nature Club in Freelton, Ontario, are listed below.

Year	Winner	Country/State Represented	Venue / Host Location	Historical Documentation / Notes
1970	—	—	Freelton, Ontario	Twelve competitors competed in the first event, and judges included CFL defensive lineman Angelo Mosca and Toronto broadcaster Gordon Sinclair.
1971	Rosemarie Hess	Montreal, Canada	Freelton, Ontario	Hess, a 25-year-old Swiss department store employee, took home the title in front of 3,000 spectators.
1972	Jocelyne Lapine	Montreal, Canada	Freelton, Ontario	The third year of the competition, which took place at the Four Seasons nudist resort close to Hamilton, was won by Lapine, 22.
1974	Deana Sands	United States (California)	Roselawn, Indiana (Semi-Finals) / Freelton, Ontario	At 18 years old, Fountain Valley, California native secured the title during the fifth annual cycle of the pageant.
1973	Dee Dee Nolet	(United States) California, U.S.	Freelton, Ontario	Nolet, hailing from San Bernardino, won out of a field of 33 international contestants. The event inspired documentary works by visiting artists.
1976	Nona Montague	United States (California)	Hamilton / Freelton, Ontario	On 25 July 1976, 28-year-old San Diego resident was crowned Miss Nude World before a live audience of approximately 5,000 spectators.
1977	Brenda Holliday	United States (Texas)	Four Seasons Nature Club, Freelton, Ontario	A 19-year-old Houston native who defeated regional runners-up from Canada and Florida to win the title.
1980	Peggy McIntaggart	Canada (Ontario)		On a dare, she entered the competition in Stoney Creek, Ontario, in 1980 when she was 20-years-old, and she won.

=== Historical Record Gaps ===
Due to the fragmentation of counterculture print preservation from the mid-to-late 20th century, thorough tracking of the annual Miss Nude World titleholders is still methodically lacking.

== See also ==
- Naturism in Canada
