= List of Playboy Playmates of 1990 =

The following is a list of Playboy Playmates of 1990. Playboy magazine names its Playmate of the Month each month throughout the year.

== January ==
Peggy McIntaggart
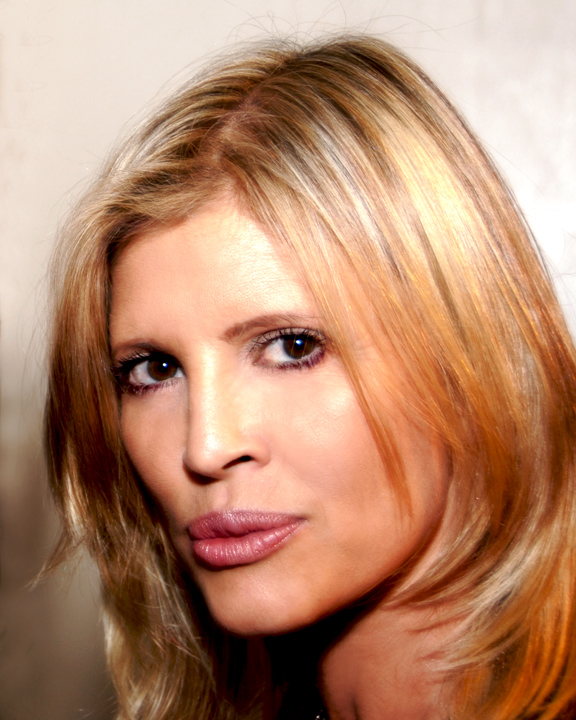
- McIntaggart in 2007

Personal details
- Born: September 6, 1961 (age 65) Penetanguishene, Ontario, Canada
- Height: 5 ft 7 in (1.70 m)

Peggy McIntaggart (also known as Peggy Sands and Peggy Sanders) (born September 6, 1961, Penetanguishene, Ontario) is a Canadian model, actress, photographer and stylist who was Playboy's Playmate of the Month for January 1990.

McIntaggart grew up in Ontario, Canada. In 1980, when she was twenty, she entered the Miss Nude World contest in Stoney Creek, Ontario, on a dare and ended up winning. As a result, she decided to pursue a career in modeling. After appearing in Playboy, McIntaggart began acting. She appeared in Baywatch, Beverly Hills Cop II and Camp Fear. McIntaggart also worked as Hugh Hefner's make-up artist and hair stylist. She dated Bob Seagren. The relationship ended in 2007. Peggy McIntaggart changed career from modeling and acting to becoming a professional makeup artist, hair stylist, and photographer.

== February ==
Pamela Anderson
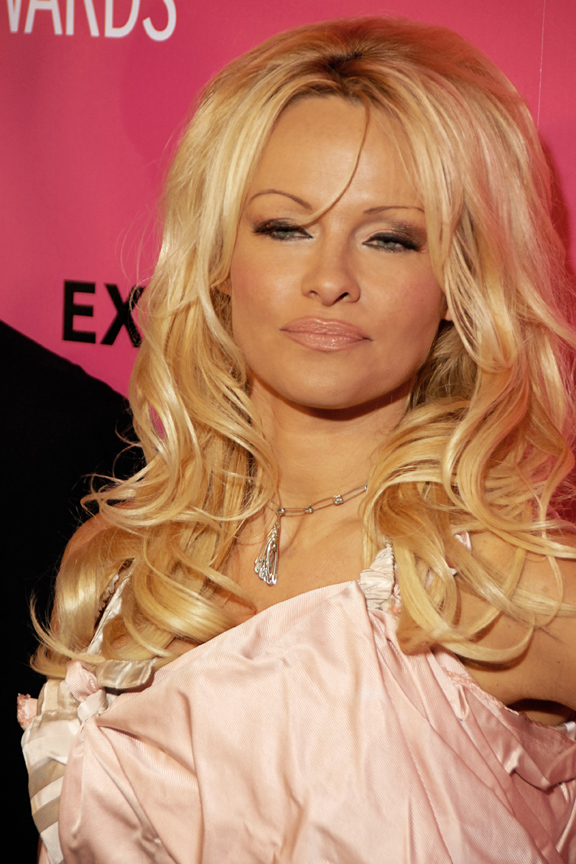
- Pamela Anderson attending "The 6th Annual Hollywood Style Awards" Beverly Hills, California on Oct. 10, 2009

Personal details
- Born: July 1, 1967 (age 59) Ladysmith, British Columbia, Canada
- Height: 5 ft 7 in (1.70 m)

Pamela Denise Anderson (born July 1, 1967) is a Canadian actress. She is a famous glamour model, actress, producer, author, activist, and former showgirl, known for her roles on the television series Home Improvement, Baywatch, and V.I.P.

She was chosen as a Playmate of the Month for Playboy magazine in February 1990. For a time, she was known as Pamela Anderson Lee (or Pamela Lee) after marrying Mötley Crüe drummer Tommy Lee. She holds both United States and Canadian citizenship.

Anderson's Playboy career spans approximately three decades (1989–2016), and she has appeared on more Playboy covers than anyone else (fourteen). She has also made appearances in the publication's newsstand specials.

== March ==
Deborah Driggs
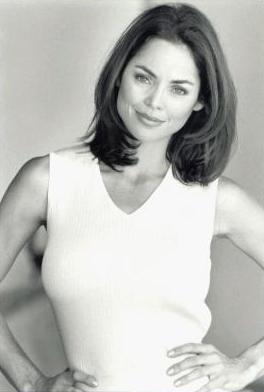

Personal details
- Born: December 13, 1963 (age 62) Oakland, California, U.S.
- Height: 5 ft 6 in (1.68 m)

Deborah Driggs (born December 13, 1963, in Oakland, California) is an American model and actress. She was chosen as Playboy's Playmate of the Month for March 1990. She also appeared on the cover of the magazine for its April 1990 issue. She was married to the Olympic gymnast Mitch Gaylord from June 28, 1992, through January 1, 2003 and they have three children. She is the coauthor, along with Karen Risch, of the book Hot Pink: The Girls' Guide to Primping, Passion, and Pubic Fashion. She also appeared in one of the videos for the Devo single "Post Post-Modern Man". She is a member of the Driggs family.

== April ==
Lisa Matthews

Playboy Playmate of the Year
- 1991
- Preceded by: Renee Tenison
- Succeeded by: Corinna Harney

Personal details
- Born: September 24, 1969 (age 57) Peoria, Illinois, U.S.
- Height: 5 ft 9 in (1.75 m)

Lisa Matthews (born Lisa Reich on September 24, 1969, in Peoria, Illinois) is an American model and actress. She was chosen as Playboy's Playmate of the Month for April 1990, and was later named 1991's Playmate of the Year. She received over $100,000 for her winnings. That year, Matthews appeared in the Bruce Willis film Hudson Hawk. She dated the movie's producer, Joel Silver. In May 2017, at the age of 47, Matthews duplicated her Playmate of the Year cover along with her cohorts Kimberly Conrad, Renee Tenison, Candace Collins, Cathy St. George, Charlotte Kemp, and Monique St. Pierre nearly three decades on.

== May ==
Tina Bockrath

Personal details
- Born: June 30, 1967 (age 59) Dayton, Ohio, U.S.
- Height: 5 ft 8 in (1.73 m)

Tina Bockrath (born June 30, 1967 in Dayton, Ohio) is an American model and actress. She was chosen as Playboy's Playmate of the Month for May 1990 and has appeared in numerous Playboy videos. Bockrath was the final Playmate of the Month photographed by Pompeo Posar.

== June ==
Bonnie Marino

Personal details
- Born: December 20, 1961 (age 64) Cleveland, Ohio, U.S.
- Height: 5 ft 8.5 in (1.74 m)

Bonnie Marino (born December 20, 1961, in Cleveland, Ohio) is an American model and actress. She was chosen as the Playboy magazine's Playmate of the Month for June 1990.

== July ==
Jacqueline Sheen

Personal details
- Born: March 3, 1963 (age 63) Dallas, Texas, U.S.
- Height: 5 ft 4 in (1.63 m)

Jacqueline Sheen (born March 3, 1963, in Dallas) is an American model and actress. She was chosen as Playboy's Playmate of the Month for July 1990 and has appeared in numerous Playboy videos.

== August ==
Melissa Evridge

Personal details
- Born: November 2, 1968 (age 57) Lexington, Kentucky, U.S.
- Height: 5 ft 6 in (1.68 m)

Melissa Evridge (born November 2, 1968, in Lexington, Kentucky) is an American model and actress. She was chosen as Playboy's Playmate of the Month for August 1990 and has appeared in numerous Playboy videos. She also appeared on the cover of the October 1990 issue of the magazine.

== September ==
Kerri Kendall
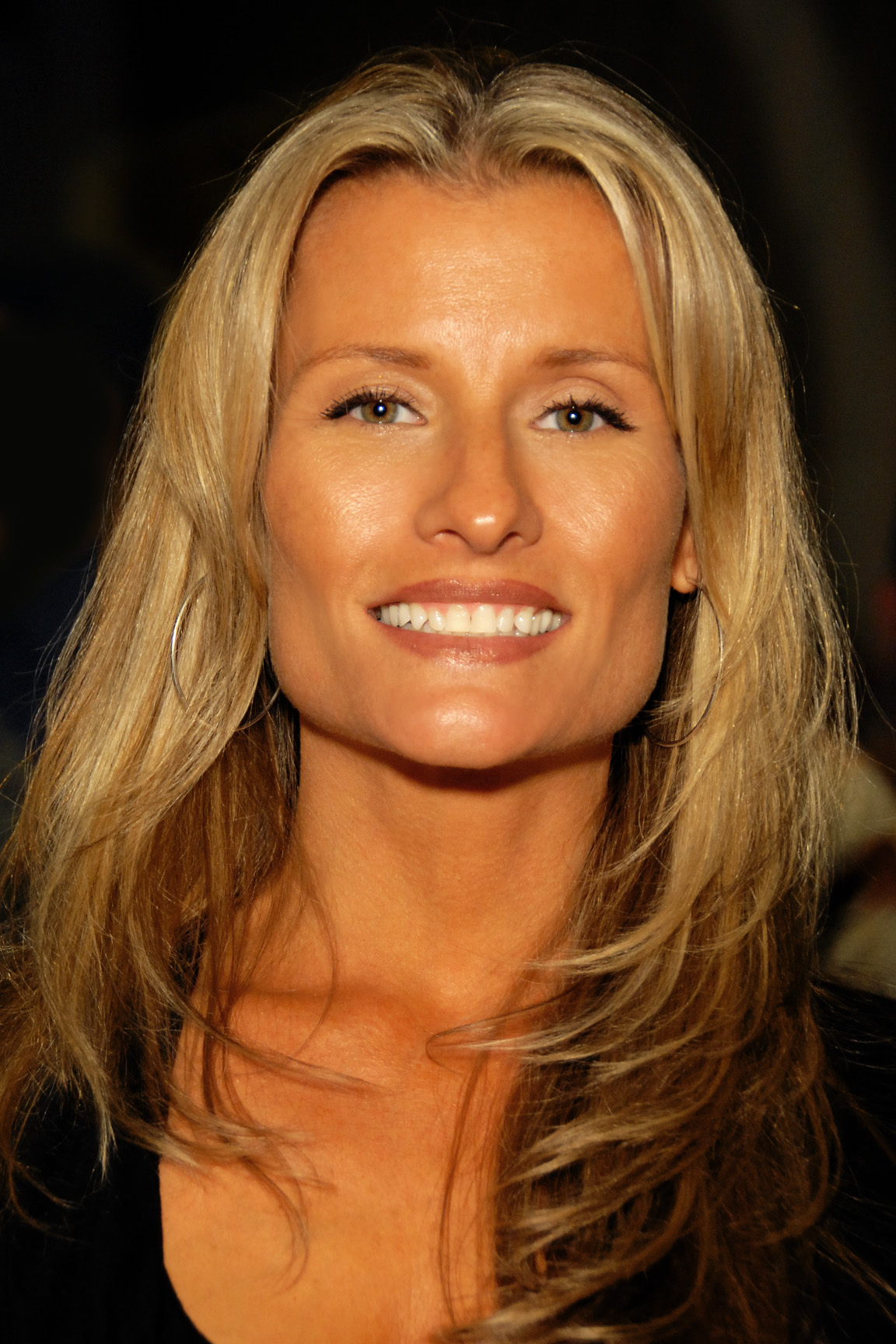
- Kerri Kendall attending Glamourcon #50, Long Beach, California on November 13, 2010

Personal details
- Born: September 25, 1970 (age 56) San Diego, California, U.S.
- Height: 5 ft 5.5 in (1.66 m)

Kerri Kendall (born September 25, 1970) is a Californian model and actress. She was chosen as Playboy's Playmate of the Month in September 1990 and has appeared in numerous Playboy videos. She also appeared as a model for Perfect 10.

== October ==
Brittany York

Personal details
- Born: 26 February 1965 (age 61) London, England
- Height: 5 ft 6 in (1.68 m)

Alison Armitage (born 26 February 1965 in London, England) is a British actress. Under the pseudonym Brittany York, she was Playboy's Playmate of the Month for October 1990.

Armitage had a leading role in the television series Acapulco H.E.A.T. from 1993 to 1994 and from 1996 to 1997. She has also had bit parts in movies such as Jerry Maguire and Driven. She also appeared in a pictorial in Maxim magazine in 1999.

== November ==
Lorraine Olivia

Personal details
- Born: February 20, 1968 (age 58) Geneva, Illinois, U.S.
- Height: 5 ft 6 in (1.68 m)

Lorraine Olivia (born February 20, 1968, in Geneva, Illinois) is an American model and actress. She was chosen as Playboy's Playmate of the Month for November 1990. She had a bit part in the 1993 film Coneheads, playing an attractive dancer on Remulac.

== December ==
Morgan Fox

Personal details
- Born: May 28, 1970 (age 56) Prince George, British Columbia, Canada
- Height: 5 ft 11 in (1.80 m)

Morgan Fox (born May 28, 1970 in Prince George, British Columbia) is a Canadian model and actress.

In 1988 she became Miss World Canada. In 1990, she played the role of "Robunda Hooters" in the film Flesh Gordon Meets the Cosmic Cheerleaders. She was chosen as Playboy's Playmate of the Month for December 1990 and has appeared in Playboy videos.

== See also ==
- List of people in Playboy 1990–1999

Peggy McIntaggart	Pamela Anderson	Deborah Driggs	Lisa Matthews	Tina Bockrath	Bonnie Marino
Jacqueline Sheen	Melissa Evridge	Kerri Kendall	Brittany York	Lorraine Olivia	Morgan Fox
