= Stephen Wayda =

American professional photographer (born 1946)

- Born: December 12, 1946 (age 79); Los Angeles, California, U.S.
- Occupation: Photographer
- Known for: Playboy magazine Principal photographer of Pamela Anderson in Pictures: Photographs

Stephen Wayda (born December 12, 1946) is an American professional photographer, known for his photography for Playboy.

== Early life and education ==
Wayda was born in Los Angeles and grew up in Southern California. After high school, he attended the University of Utah where he majored in journalism and political science. Wayda hoped to join the Navy ROTC and fly jets, but when his grandfather died and left him a camera collection, he taught himself photography.

== Career ==
Wayda worked as a newspaper reporter at The Salt Lake Tribune for seven years, where his photographs accompanied the stories he reported. While working for the Tribune, Wayda was honored for saving the life of Salt Lake City police officer Brent Elcock. Having developed a method to enhance the reproduction of photographs in the letterpress newspapers, Wayda began his commercial photography career taking newspaper photographs for Zions Cooperative Mercantile Institution (ZCMI), a Salt Lake City based department store, working with models from a local agency.

=== Photography ===
Wayda was introduced to the Playboy editor Marilyn Grabowski through the photographer Dwight Hooker. For forty years, Grabowski was the woman behind the centerfolds, defining the pages of Playboy. Playboy publisher, Hugh Hefner, said, "…from an inauspicious start, he has become the most published photographer in the history of Playboy. His iconic images have helped change the way the world looks at women, and the way women look at the world. His influence on photography can not be overstated. […] His contribution to photography will live on for generations to come." Wayda's photos have been featured on the cover of Playboy more than any other photographer. He was the principal photographer for Pamela Anderson, and his photographs are found in the book Pamela Anderson in Pictures.

Wayda has photographed such celebrities as Jack Nicholson, Denzel Washington, Arnold Schwarzenegger, Danny DeVito, Tom Selleck, Demi Moore, Claudia Schiffer, Linda Evangelista, the Game, Kid Rock, Travis Barker, Kim Kardashian, Brooke Burke and Jenny McCarthy. Wayda's photographs have been featured in fashion, lifestyle, and sport magazines.

== Bibliography ==
- Wayda, Stephen; Jordan, Bibi (1996). Pamela Anderson in Pictures: Photographs by Stephen Wayda. General Pub Group. ISBN 978-1881649946.
