= Playboy Special Edition =

Unique, infrequent, or semi-regular spin-offs of the magazine

Playboy Special Editions
- Executive editor: Stacy S. Collins
- Categories: Photography/erotica
- Frequency: Varied by Publication
- Publisher: Playboy Publishing
- First issue: 1963
- Final issue: 2016
- Company: Playboy Enterprises, Inc.
- Country: United States
- Language: English

Playboy Special Editions (formerly known as flats, then Newsstand Specials) are a spin-off series of Playboy magazine containing glamour and softcore nude photographs. The initially infrequent and later semi-regular editions ran from 1963 through 2000 (under the Playboy Press brand) then re-branded from 2000 through 2012 final issues (under the Playboy Special Edition "SE" brand). A one-off special edition was published in February 2015 featuring images of models in different locations within California from the controversial photographer Terry Richardson.

Unlike the monthly magazine, which features a variety of articles, opinion columns, and works of fiction, only minimal text was included in the Special Editions, mostly consisting of captions of the photographs and readers' letters. Two issues were usually published each month. While the magazines often featured former Playmates of the Month, many other models also appeared in them.

Early issues, beginning in 1983, featured approximately 100 pages of old reprint and outtake photos of Playmates with no specially commissioned photos. Issues from the early 1990s began to include a number of "one-shot" models purchased in bulk from glamour photographers. By the mid-1990s, Playboy had established a distinct identity for the line by mixing new shots of recent Playmates with new models, some of whom soon became as popular as the Playmates themselves.

Playboy "Special Collector's Editions". These monthly publications contained themed pictorials each month and ran from August 2013 through September 2016. The issues published from 2013 through 2015 were sold at Barnes and Nobles bookstores. In 2016 the Special Collector's Editions were only mailed to subscribers and thus are much harder to find.

"Supplement to Playboy", aka Playboy Supplements. These books have never been sold by PLAYBOY and could only be obtained in sealed subscription issues, sealed newsstand issues, by giving a gift subscription or making a purchase from the PLAYBOY Products Catalog. Most say "Supplement To PLAYBOY" on the cover, except a couple of cover variations described in the Supplement section below. Issues from 1989 through 1994 were 52 pages in length. In 1995 Uncensored Portraits was 52 pages but Sexy, Steamy, Sultry was only 36 pages. From 1996 on all issues are 36 pages. The dates listed for each book are taken from the copyright information on the inside cover. Beginning in 1996 PLAYBOY began reprinting certain books and changed the dates as appropriate. Aside from the dates the contents of each reprint are identical. Sometime around 2010 they began producing books that had no copyright dates in them and also may have contained fewer than the standard 36 pages. Some of these are reprints of books issued before 2010 and others are new books entirely. The dates assigned to these are best guesses based on the information at hand.

Playboy VIP Club Magazine. V.I.P. Magazine was the official newsletter of the PLAYBOY Clubs and was sent to Club "key holders" through the mail, or copies could be picked up at any PLAYBOY Club. Each issue is jammed full of pictures of the Clubs and Bunnies as well as celebrity visitors and extensive coverage of the featured entertainers. These magazines also contain a wealth of ads for numerous PLAYBOY products and are excellent for reference. There were five issues of V.I.P. published in 1964 (FEB, APR, JUL, SEP, and Dec.), and three in 1965 (MAR, JUL, HOLIDAY). After that, a quarterly schedule (SPRING, SUMMER, FALL, WINTER) was established and continued from 1966 until publication ceased with VOL.47, Fall 1975. For some unexplained reason, after a lapse of nearly seven years, another issue was published in the summer of 1982. This is the nearly mythical "V.48". Since there is no evidence that this issue was ever mailed to Club key holders, the only way to have obtained a copy was in person at one of the Clubs. Beginning with V.25 and continuing through V.47, each issue contained three coupons which could be detached and redeemed at a Club for the then-current issue of PLAYBOY Magazine, or in later years OUI Magazine as well. Needless to say, this was an extremely popular bonus, and a huge percentage of the copies still in existence are missing one or more of these coupons. Although the page containing the coupons was not included in the actual page count of the issue, most collectors find them highly desirable.

Other notable Playboy special publications. Playboy Philosophy, this four-volume series published from 1963 to 1965 reprints all twenty-two (22) chapters as they originally appeared in Playboy magazines from Dec 1962 to Mat 1965. Each volume is approximately 48 pages with heavy stock covers, and each volume cover is a different color. Playboy merchandise/gift catalogs, various catalogs printed between the years of 1964 through 2011 in which Playboy merchandise, collectibles, clothing, and back magazines issues were available for purchase using in-issue order cards. The Playboy Channel (Guide), 21 pamphlet sized channel guides published from November 1986 through August/September 1988, which listed in guide format content playing on the then very popular cable channel (as TV Guide and local newspaper guides declined to include Playboy's content in their publications). Pocket Playmates, a 6 issue series that ran from 1995 to 1997 where each issue focused on playmates from a specific span of years (Vol. #1: 1989 to 1994; Vol. #2: 1983 to 1988; Vol. #3: 1977 to 1982; Vol. #4: 1971 to 1976; Vol. #5: 1965 to 1970; and Vol. #5: 1953 to 1964, 1995 to 1996).

== List of Special Editions ==
A Playboy Special Edition cover (July 1999) featuring Christi Taylor.

There were several long-running series of Special Editions, as well as short series and one-offs.

=== Beauties ===
- Barefoot Beauties 4 issues (annual series, 1999, 2001-2003)
- Bathing Beauties 7 issues (annual series, 1989–1995)
- Exotic Beauties 4 issues (annual series, 2002–2004, 2007)
- Natural Beauties 19 issues (annual series 1998–2004 [7], 2006-2007 [2], bi-annual series 2008-2012 [10])
- Asian Beauties (one-shot, 2000)

=== Book of Lingerie/Lingerie ===
Playboy Special Editions' longest-running series is Lingerie (formerly known as Book of Lingerie). The first issue was released as Book of Lingerie in 1984. Two further issues were published in 1987 and 1988; a bimonthly series began with the November 1988 issue. The title was changed to Lingerie with the September 2002 issue.

- Book of Lingerie 3 issues (three one-shots, 1984–1988)
- Book of Lingerie 82 issues (bimonthly series, 1988–2002) 1 issue, [March 2001 alternate Tammy Murtagh cover]
- Lingerie 62 issues (bimonthly series, 2002–2012)

=== Celebrities ===
- Vanna White (1987)
- Kimberley Conrad Hefner (1989)
- Dian Parkinson (1993)
- Anna Nicole Smith (1995)
- Pam Anderson (1996)
- Rena Mero (Wrestling Superstar Sable) (1999)

=== College Girls ===
The May 2002 issue caused some controversy at Baylor University, which has a religious affiliation. Baylor declared that associating with the magazine would be a violation of the school's code of conduct.

- College Girls 4 issues (one-shots, 1983, 1988, 1991 and 1993)
- College Girls 38 issues (series, 1995–2012) 1 issue, [Jan-Feb 2009 alternate Chloe Mayers cover]
- Sexy College Girls 2 issues (2001–2002)
- College Girls Wet & Wild (one-shot, 2002)
- Nude College Girls 2 issues (2003–2004)
- College Girls Nude (one-shot, 2005)

=== Girls of/seasonal issues ===
- Girls of Summer 21 issues (series, 1983-1984, 1986, 1988-2004, 2012)
- Girls of Winter 3 issues (1984, 1988, 1999)
- Winter Girls (one-shot, 1996)

=== Girls/Women of the World ===
- Women of the World (one-shot, 1987)
- Girls of the World (two issues, 1992–1994)
- Sexy Girls of the World (two issues, 2001–2010)

=== Girls Next Door ===
- Sexy Girls Next Door 12 issues (1998–2012)

=== Playboy Nudes ===
- Nudes, 28 issues (annual series, 1990–2004, bi-annual 2006-2010, annual 2011–2012)

=== Playmate Search ===
- Great Playmate Hunt (one-shot, 1989)
- Great Playmate Search (one-shot, 1994)
- Playmate 2000 (Feb 2000)
- Playmate 2000 Part 2 (Apr 2000)
- Playmate Search 50 (one-shot, 2004)

=== Playmates ===
- Calendar Playmates (one-shot, 1992)
- Celebrating Centerfolds (five issues, 1998–2000)
- Centerfolds of the Century (one-shot, 2000)
- Classic Centerfolds (one-shot, 1998)
- Facts & Figures (one-shot, 1997)
- International Playmates (two issues, 1992–1993)
- Nude Playmates (14 issues, one issue per year, 1997–1998, 2001–2012)
- Playmate Review (28 issues, annual series, 1985–2012)
- Playmate Tests (two issues, 1998–1999)
- Playmates (two issues, 1983–1984)
- Playmates at Play (one-shot, 1994)
- Playmates in Bed (11 issues, 1995–2008)
- Playmates in Paradise (one-shot, 1994)
- Playmates in the Spotlight (one-shot, 1989)
- Playmates of the Year (two issues, 1986, 2000)
- Playboy's Playmates The First 15 Years (one-shot, 1983)
- Playboy's Playmates The Second 15 Years (one-shot, 1984)
- Sexiest Playmates (one-shot, 2001)
- Twenty-One Playmates (two issues, 1996–1997)
- Video Playmates (one-shot, 1993)
- Wet & Wild Playmates (one-shot, 1994)

=== Voluptuous Vixens/Vixens ===
The Voluptuous Vixens/Vixens series features models with large breasts. Ten issues of Voluptuous Vixens were published, once or twice per year, beginning in 1998. A bimonthly series, simply titled Vixens, began in 2005 and ran for 12 issues. The original title resumed in 2007, appearing on a thrice-yearly schedule.

- Voluptuous Vixens (10 issues, 1998–2004)
- Vixens (bimonthly series, 2005–2007)
- Voluptuous Vixens (thrice-yearly series, 2007–2012)

=== Wet & Wild ===
- Wet & Wild Women (three issues, 1987, 1990, 1993)
- Wet & Wild (10 issues, 1996–2011)

=== Occasional ===
- Big Boobs & Hot Buns 5 issues (2008–2012)
- Blondes, Brunettes and Redheads 8 issues (1985, 1990, 1993, 1997, 2002, 2003, 2007, 2011)
- Casting Calls 2 issues (2001–2002)
- Cover Girls 2 issues (1986, 1997)
- Fantasies 2 issues (Feb & May 1991)
- Fresh Faces 4 issues (Jun & Oct 2008, Jun & Oct 2009)
- Girlfriends 6 issues (1998–2003)
- Girls with Girls 6 issues (2004, 2006–2010)
- Hardbodies 2 issues (1996, 1999)
- Hot Housewives 10 issues (2007–2012)
- Hot Shots 5 issues (2004–2008)
- Nude Celebrities (two issues, 1995, 1997)
- Real Sex 2 issues (1998–1999)
- Sexy 100 8 issues (2003–2010)
- Sexy Celebrities 2 issues (2001–2002)
- Sexy Girls 2 issues (2004, 2011)
- Sexy Nudes 4 issues (Mar, May, Jul, Sep 2005) [The cover image and contents match the College Girls publications with the same dates]
- Sisters 2 issues (1986, 1992)
- Supermodels 2 issues (1995, 1998)
- Working Women 2 issues (1984, 1988)
- Year In Sex 2 issues (1988–1989)

=== One-shots ===
- Women of Television (1984)
- Playboy - The Parody (1984)
- Newsmakers (1985)
- Pompeo Posar (1985)
- Entertaining Women (1985)
- Sporting Women (1986)
- Country Girls (1987)
- Holiday Girls (1987)
- Photography (1988)
- Women on the Move (1988)
- 100 Beautiful Women (1988)
- Sex and Other Late-Night Laughs (1990; contains cartoons only)
- Women (1991)
- Career Girls (1992)
- Beauty Queens (1994)
- Hot Denim Daze (1995)
- Sexy Ladies (1995)
- Blondes (1995)
- Sexy Swimsuits (1996)
- World Wide Nudes (one-shot, 1996)
- Lingerie Model Search (1997)
- Sexy Latin Ladies (1997)
- Women of Color (1997)
- Playboy's 1998 Guide to Men's Clubs (1997)
- X-Girls (1997)
- Body Language (1998)
- Sex Stars of the Century (1999)
- Sexy Girls in Sports (2000)
- CyberGirls (2002)

=== Special Collector's Editions ===
- Best of Italia (Aug 2013)
- Best of Brazil (Sep 2013)
- Best of Latin America (Oct 2013)
- Best of Russia (Nov 2013)
- Every Playmate of the Year (Dec 2013)
- The Butt Issue (Jan 2014)
- Girls & Cars (Feb 2014)
- Summer Beach Spectacular (Mar 2014)
- The Lingerie Issue (Apr 2014)
- The Natural Issue (May 2014)
- Playmates of the World (Jun 2014)
- 70s Playmates (Jul 2014)
- 80s Playmates (Aug 2014)
- 90s Playmates (Sep 2014)
- Sporty Girls (Oct 2014)
- College Girls (Nov 2014)
- Best of 2014 (Dec 2014)
- Wet & Wild (Jan 2015)
- Country Girls (Feb 2015)
- Legs (Mar 2015)
- Black & White (Apr 2015)
- Red Heads (May 2015)
- Between the Sheets (Jun 2015)
- Girls of Summer (Jul 2015)
- Best Blondes (Aug 2015)
- Playmates of the World (Sep 2015)
- Lingerie Special (Oct 2015)
- Bums (Nov 2015)
- Winter Bunnies (Dec 2015)
- Boating Beauties (Jan 2016)
- Brown Eyed Girls (Feb 2016)
- Girls & Cars (Mar 2016)
- Spring Fever (Apr 2016)
- Beach Babes (May 2016)
- Bathing Beauties (Jun 2016)
- Around the World (Jul 2016)
- Equestrian Beauties (Aug 2016)
- Boho Beauties (Sep 2016)

=== Supplement to Playboy ===
- 50 Beautiful Women (1989 standard and variant without "Supplement to Playboy" text on cover)
- Midnight Playmates (1989 standard and variant without "Supplement to Playboy" text on cover), reprinted (1996 and 1998) with 36 pages instead of original 52
- Foxiest Females (1991)
- Garters and Lace (1992)
- Centerfold Sensations (1993), reprinted (1998 and 2001) with 36 pages instead of original 52
- Satin Leather & Lace (1993)
- Playmate Fantasies (1994)
- Secrets of Super Sex (1995), non-standard supplement [pamphlet sized]
- Sexy, Steamy, Sultry (1995)
- Uncensored Portraits (1995), reprinted (1996)
- Bare Naked Beauties (1996)
- Bare, Beautiful & Blonde (1996), reprinted (2002)
- Best of Bathing Beauties (1996), reprinted (1998 and 2001)
- Erotic Sensations (1996), reprinted (1998, 2000, and 2001)
- Forbidden Pleasures (1996), reprinted (2001 and 2002)
- Playmates Exposed (1997), reprinted (1998, 2001, 2002, and 2003)
- 36 Uncensored Portraits (1998)
- Locker Room Fantasies (1998), reprinted (1999, 2002, and 2003)
- Passions & Fantasies (1998), reprinted (2000 and 2001)
- Sizzling Celebrities (1998)
- 50 Hottest Nudes (1999)
- Tanned and Topless (1999)
- Nude College Girls (2000), reprinted (2001, 2002, and 2003)
- Secret Pleasures (2000), reprinted (2001)
- Most Beautiful Women (2001)
- Nude Slumber Party (2001)
- Tanned & Topless (2001)
- Hottest Centerfold (2002), reprinted (2003)
- Swimsuit Issue Uncensored (2002)
- Wet Wild on Campus (2002)
- College Girl Fantasies (2003), reprinted (2004)
- College Girls Exposed (2003), reprinted (2004)
- Erotic Fantasies Uncensored (2003)
- Sexy Nude Coeds (2003)
- Sizzling Summer Nudes (2003), reprinted (2004)
- Fantasy Photo Album Uncensored (2004), reprinted (2005)
- Hottest Student Bodies (2004)
- Nude Spring Break (2004), reprinted (2005)
- Red Hot Blondes (2004)
- 100 Hot Nudes (2005), reprinted (2006)
- Campus Girls Uncensored (2005), reprinted (2006)
- Hot College Girls Nude (2005)
- Hot Office Girls (2005)
- Voluptuous Nudes Exposed (2005)
- 99 Voluptuous Fantasies (2006)
- Hot Naked Coeds (2006)
- Hot Summer Nudes (2006)
- Sexy Nude College Girls (2006)
- Thongs, Garters And Girls (2006)
- Topless College Babes (2006), reprinted (2007 and 2008)
- Wet Hot & Sexy (2006), reprinted (2007 and 2008)
- Erotic Review (2007)
- Hot Nude Amateurs (2007)
- Nude Pool Party (2007), reprinted (2008)
- Wild College Girls (2007), reprinted (2008)
- 36 Nude Playmates (2008)
- Canadian Collector's Edition (Jayde Nicole) (2008), possibly sold in June 2008 newsstand issues only in Canada
- Red Hot Vixens (2008)
- Sexy Nude Playmates (2008)
- Centerfolds Exposed (2009)
- Girlfriends Exposed (2009)
- Nude Housewives Uncensored (2009)
- Wet Hot Coeds (2009)
- Girls of Playboy Brazil (2010)
- Hot Natural Nudes (2010)
- Hot Nudes Uncensored (2010)
- Hot Sexy Playmates (2010)
- Naughty Coeds Exposed (2010)
- Ultimate Nudes Uncensored (2010)
- Hot Party Girls (2011)
- Naughty Naked Coeds (2011)
- Nude Beach Babes (2011)
- Sexy Sorority Girls (2011)
- Passport Wanderlust (2013)
- 80s Playmates (2014)
- Country Girls (2015)
- Girls in Lingerie (2016)

== List of Playboy Press Publications ==
Before publishing its Special Edition line, Playboy published a line of hardcover and paperback volumes featuring text, photos, and cartoons; some included only content reprinted from the parent magazine; others incorporated original material. Several volumes collected only cartoons from the magazine. A few volumes went through multiple printings, sometimes with replacement covers.

=== Series ===
- The Best from Playboy/Playboy Annual (three hardcover volumes, 1954–1957)
- The Playboy Cartoon Album (eight volumes, 1963–1981)
- The Best from Playboy (ten volumes, 1963–1983)
- Playboy's Holiday Album (two volumes, 1970–1971)
- Playboy's Girls of the World (two volumes, 1971–1972)
- Playboy Bunnies (three volumes, 1972, 1979 and 1983)
- The Pocket Playboy (six volumes, 1973–1975)
- The Girls of Playboy (five volumes, 1973–1982)
- Eve Today (two volumes, 1974–1975)
- Playboy's New Holiday Album (two volumes, 1975–1976)
- Ecstasy (two volumes, 1976)
- Sexy Ladies (two volumes, 1977–1978)
- Fashion for Men (semiannual series, 1981–1983)

=== Cartoonist collections ===
- Playboy's John Dempsey (1970)
- Playboy's Phil Interlandi (1971)
- Playboy's Little Annie Fanny (1972)
- Playboy's Alden Erikson (1972)
- Playboy's Vargas Girls (1972)
- Playboy's Gahan Wilson (1973)
- Playboy's Buck Brown (1981)

=== More One-Shots ===
- The Sexual Revolution (1970)
- The Youth Culture (1971)
- Mirror of Venus (1972)
- The Sensuous Society (1973)
- Women by 10 (1973)
- Love Games (1975)
- Deborah's Dreams (A Victorian Fantasy) (1976)
- Love Scenes (1976)
- Noelle (and the Twelve Nights of Christmas) (1976)
- Leading Ladies (1981, also reprinted in 1983)
- Dreams (Richard Fegley) (1982)
