= List of Playboy videos =

Numerous videos have been released by Playboy Enterprises, the publishers of Playboy magazine. They are largely made up of music-video-style vignettes featuring Playboy Playmates and other models in various stages of nudity and, on occasion, softcore sex scenes.

The last Playboy home video to be released was the 2008 DVD 2009 Playmate Video Calendar.

== Video magazine series ==
The first videos released under the Playboy banner were issues of Playboy Video Magazine (also known as Playboy Video and Playboy Video Collectors Edition). Twelve issues were released in this series, from January 1983 to 1987. Early volumes on CED, laserdisc, and Japanese VHD, while all volumes appeared on Betamax and VHS. Issues contained content similar to the magazine; in addition to video pictorials of the Playmates, celebrities, and other models, segments on music, interviews with celebrities, comedy sketches, and other material was included (the format being similar to Electric Blue, a UK video magazine that aired on the Playboy Channel). Total running time of an issue is longer than other Playboy videos (80–90 minutes versus 35–60 minutes), but with a similar total amount of running time devoted to model pictorials.

Issue #1 is the first Playboy video to feature a Playmate of the Year (PMOY) (1982's Shannon Tweed), and the first Video Centerfold (Lonny Chin, Playboy's January 1983 Playmate). Other segments in the first issue are an interview with John and Bo Derek, an erotic fiction short, a documentary look at historic moments in Playboy, a pictorial of actress Barbara Carrera, a look at the Playboy Jazz Festival, comedy shorts from Michael Nesmith, and a pictorial of the Crazy Horse Saloon dancers.

== Calendar series ==
In 1986, the Playmate calendar series began with a volume for the coming year, 1987. This series focused on the Playmates themselves and did not try to imitate the content of the magazine. Although the months assigned to the Playmates in the videos are not the same as the months in which they appear in the magazine, nearly all Playmates from 1987 on have appeared in a Playmate video calendar. Playmates of the Year have also appeared in a special individual video profiles.

Each video begins with the voice of Neil Ross, the narrator for most of Playboy's productions, saying:

"Since 1958, Playboy calendars have been prized collector's items. Over the years Playmates have appeared in this favorite form of pinup art. Now for your home viewing pleasure, Playboy continues this tradition, as the playmates come alive in this edition of the [year] Playmate video calendar."

The video profile of a Playmate is shot at the same time that her magazine centerfold and pictorial are photographed. These usually consist of three or four vignettes reflecting the personality and persona of the Playmate and an interview is also conducted at the same time to serve as in introduction to her viewers. Two of the vignettes are then chosen to be included as part of her video Playmate profile. The very first Playmate to appear in a Playmate video calendar was Cherie Witter, Miss January 1987 (Miss February 1985 in the magazine).

In the early video Playmate calendars, a significant amount of time was given to each Playmate to introduce herself, two or three minutes were spent on describing her aspirations and goals. This was then followed by a nude profile.

== Video Centerfold ==
The Video Centerfold series, launched in 1985 with a volume dedicated to Sherry Arnett, consists of videos with a primary focus on a current Playmate, usually paired with a shorter Playmate profile or documentary short. Releases are around one hour long, with 45 minutes devoted to the primary Playmate, and 15 minutes to the secondary feature. Playmate of the Year (launched in 1987 with a volume on Donna Edmondson) and Anniversary Playmate videos (begun in 1989 with 35th Anniversary Playmate Fawna Maclaren) are subsets of the Video Centerfold series, focusing on prominent Playmates. PMOY series continues.

Standard Video Centerfold releases were of Playmates of the Month, and were usually released close to the Playmate's appearance in the magazine. The title for a standard Video Centerfold is Playboy Video Centerfold: [model name]. Early releases include Playmates such as Tawnni Cable with a documentary on photographer Arny Freytag, Julie Clark with a shorter profile of Playmate Stacy Arthur, the Van Breeschooten twins with a featurette on Jayne Mansfield, and Morgan Fox with a shorter profile of Playmate Wendy Kaye. Newer releases, less frequently released, feature novel or popular Playmates such as the Bernaola twins (with a featurette on the 2000 Playmate search) and the Dahm triplets (with Vanessa Gleason). At least one double Video Centerfold has been released, a 1990 release featuring half-length profiles on Deborah Driggs and Karen Foster, with a short entitled "Women in Russia."

Every year, a Playmate of the Year is chosen by Playboy magazine. At the same time as the PMOY photo shoot, a video was filmed to commemorate the occasion, and released as Playboy Video Centerfold – Playmate of the Year: [model name]. The scenes in the video are filmed Video Centerfold, a segment was presented in the Pop-Up Video format made popular by VH1 at the time.

For numerically significant anniversaries of the magazine, Playboy has released Anniversary Playmate editions of the Video Centerfold, titled Playboy Video Centerfold: [anniversary]th Anniversary Playmate: [model name]. For the 35th, 40th, 45th, and 50th anniversaries, the Anniversary Playmate videos have respectively featured Fawna Maclaren, Anna-Marie Goddard, Jaime Bergman, and Colleen Shannon. No anniversary videos were released prior to the 35th anniversary (25th and 30th anniversary Playmates were instead featured in Playboy Video Magazine releases).

During the 2016 Election, Donald Trump's appearance in a Playboy Video Centerfold was rediscovered. However, Trump did not appear in any scenes containing nudity or sexual content.

== Celebrity Centerfold ==
Playboy Celebrity Centerfold videos are similar to the Video Centerfolds, featuring a celebrity who is not a current Playmate. Prior Playmates who have become celebrities (or just notorious) in their own right may be featured in a Celebrity Centerfold. The videos are approximately 60 minutes in length, with 45 minutes devoted to the celebrity, and 15 minutes to a secondary feature. Some releases have been labelled as a "Playboy Celebrity Centerfold", but not all; the first Playboy video dedicated to a celebrity was Dorothy Stratten: The Untold Story, released in 1985.

The following women have been featured in their own celebrity centerfold videos:

- Pamela Anderson (February 11, 1992)
- Dian Parkinson (January 1, 1993)
- Jessica Hahn (April 22, 1993)
- Anna Nicole Smith (December 5, 1993)
- Jenny McCarthy (June 22, 1994)
- La Toya Jackson (April 6, 1994)
- Patti Davis (February 22, 1995)
- Shannon Tweed (September 10, 1997)
- Farrah Fawcett (June 6, 1997)
- Chyna (Joanie Laurer) (2002)

== Sexy Lingerie ==
Playboy launched its Sexy Lingerie series in 1988, featuring Playmates and other models in lingerie. In the earlier titles of the series, Playmates were shown in static poses similar to models in lingerie catalogs. . However, in later titles, the Playmates were shown in motion, such as showing them walking a cat walk or dancing.

== Wet & Wild ==
The Wet & Wild series, launched in 1989, features Playmates in various liquid environments, such as pools, bathtubs, hot tubs, saunas, fountains, water beds, milk, champagne, beer, massage oil, glycerine, chocolate syrup, and ersatz crème de cacao. Playboy produced a total of 10 videos in the Wet & Wild series.

Although the majority of sequences in the early videos of the series maintained a sense of depicting the female figure as a work of art, some sequences could be described as appealing to aquaphiliacs.

Volumes VI to IX were based loosely on several different themes including the women's locker room (Wet & Wild VI), hot holidays (Wet & Wild VII), women's buttocks (Wet & Wild VIII), and finally the season of summer (Wet & Wild: Slippery When Wet).

The final video in the series, Wet & Wild Live! Backstage Pass, was released in 2002.

== Best of videos ==
Playboy has produced several Best of videos. These have collected segments either featuring a specific Playmate (e.g., The Best of Jenny McCarthy), from a Playboy TV show (e.g., The Best of Night Calls), or from a Playboy video series (e.g., The Best of Wet & Wild).

In a rare appearance in front of the camera, Pompeo Posar, who was a Playboy photographer for more than 36 years and took more than 75 centerfolds for the magazine, appeared in The Best of Jenny McCarthy.

== Girls of... and Women of... ==
A recurring feature in the magazine is Girls of... (or sometimes Women of...), where the women involved are chosen according to a theme (often all working for a particular organization). Playboy has also produced several videos following the same idea—the most recent ones being done in conjunction with the magazine features. The first Girls of.. release was 1991's Girls of Spring Break, and the first Women of... title was 1995's Women of Color.

== Special Editions ==
Special Edition releases have a unifying theme linking the vignettes or material contained in the video, and may feature new material, recycled footage from prior releases, or combinations of new and old material. The Wet & Wild, Sexy Lingerie, and Girls of.../Women of... series above can be seen as recurrent Special Edition series, much as the print editions of Playboy Lingerie and Playboy Vixens are recurrent Special Edition series. Special Edition titles may be formatted as either Playboy <subtitle> or Playboy's <subtitle>; rare titles may eschew the Playboy fore-title altogether.

Themes of Special Edition videos include instructional (the Massage series, Secrets to Making Love to the Same Person Forever), documentary (Hugh Hefner, Rita Hayworth, Playmate Search series), comedy (Party Jokes), reality (Playmate Play-offs) and fantasy (Inside Out series, Erotic Fantasy series, Playmate Erotic Adventures). The most common type of Special Edition videos consist of themed collections of traditional music-video-style vignettes, similar to the Wet & Wild and Sexy Lingerie series. Individual releases and small series have focused on such disparate themes as feet (Barefoot Playmates), hair color (Blondes, Brunettes, and Redheads), beds (Bedtime Stories), girls with girls (Girlfriends 1 and 2), sisters and twins (Sisters and Twins and Sisters Too), technology (Gen-X Girls, wildwebgirls.com), and so on.

Recycling of footage is common; the Video Playmate Review and Playmate Six-Pack series were early clip compilations, and the later No Boys Allowed series recycles girl/girl footage from other Special Editions.

== Playboy TV ==
Several adult series originally produced for and aired on Playboy's cable channel have been released on home video. Playboy TV releases may be scene compilations, "best of" releases containing full selected episodes, or full season collections. Naked Happy Girls, 7 Lives Xposed, Foursome, Sex Court, and other series have been released in some form on Playboy Video. In addition, some series created for and aired on the Latin American Playboy channel have seen release on home video in Latin America, including the series The Last Semester and Room Service. These releases may be branded as a traditional Playboy Video, or as a Playboy TV video release.

In addition to the above, several non-adult Playboy TV series have been released on home video. Selected episodes of Playboy's Penthouse and Playboy After Dark have been released under the Playboy After Dark banner, and the newer cable series The Girls Next Door has been released in full-season sets on DVD.

== Playboy Karaoke ==
Playboy Karaoke was a licensed series of karaoke discs for karaoke-friendly optical formats (laserdisc in the US, Video CD in Hong Kong) that not only featured music and on-screen lyrics for use by karaoke DJs and singers, but also featured Playboy models and Playmates nude, singing, and dancing.
