= List of Playboy Playmates of 1988 =

The following is a list of Playboy Playmates of 1988. Playboy magazine names its Playmate of the Month each month throughout the year.

== January ==
Kimberley Conrad

Playboy Playmate of the Year
- 1989
- Preceded by: India Allen
- Succeeded by: Renee Tenison

Personal details
- Born: August 6, 1962 (age 64) Moulton, Alabama, U.S.
- Height: 5 ft 9 in (1.75 m)

Kimberley Conrad (born August 6, 1962) is an American model and actress. She was chosen as Playboy's Playmate of the Month in January, 1988 and became Playmate of the Year 1989. Conrad was born in Alabama and raised in Nevada and British Columbia. She is most known for marrying Playboy founder Hugh Hefner in 1989, an event which sparked worldwide media attention. The comic strip Doonesbury referred to the event as the belated end of the 1970s. The Hefners had two sons together: Marston Glenn Hefner (shares birthday with his father: April 9, 1990) and Cooper Bradford Hefner (September 4, 1991). After nine years of marriage, in 1998, Conrad and Hefner separated although remained married. Hugh Hefner was quoted, "I would've been happy to divorce her when we separated, but she wanted to remain married for our boys." Conrad then moved into a house next door to the Playboy Mansion. After an 11-year separation, Hefner filed for divorce stating irreconcilable differences in September 2009 after his youngest child turned 18.

Nearly three decades later in May 2017, at the age of 54, she duplicated her Playmate of the Year cover along with Renee Tenison, Candace Collins, Lisa Matthews, Cathy St. George, Charlotte Kemp, and Monique St. Pierre.

Conrad is a vegetarian and has worked with PETA.

== February ==
Kari Kennell
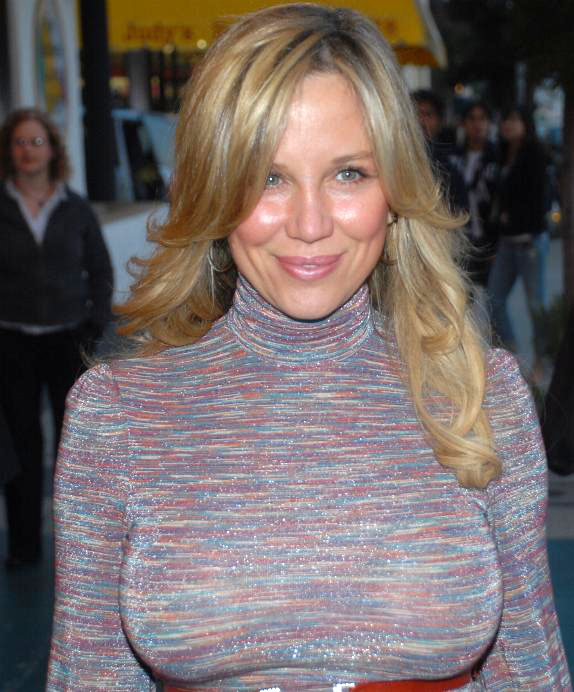

Personal details
- Born: Kari Kennell Whitman; June 21, 1964 (age 62) Colorado Springs, Colorado, U.S.
- Height: 5 ft 5 in (1.65 m)

Kari Kennell Whitman (born June 21, 1964) is an American model and actress. She was chosen as Playboy's Playmate of the Month in February, 1988. She also did mainstream acting as Kari Whitman. In March 2007, Whitman starred in a reality television series, "Designer To The Stars: Kari Whitman".

== March ==
Susie Owens

Personal details
- Born: May 28, 1956 (age 70) Arkansas City, Kansas, U.S.
- Height: 5 ft 8 in (1.73 m)

Susie Diane Owens (born May 28, 1956) is an American model and actress. She was chosen as Playboy's Playmate of the Month for March 1988. In the May 1993 issue, she was used as the model for the comic book heroine "Flaxen", and also made public appearances in costume, but the character failed to find an audience.

== April ==
Eloise Broady
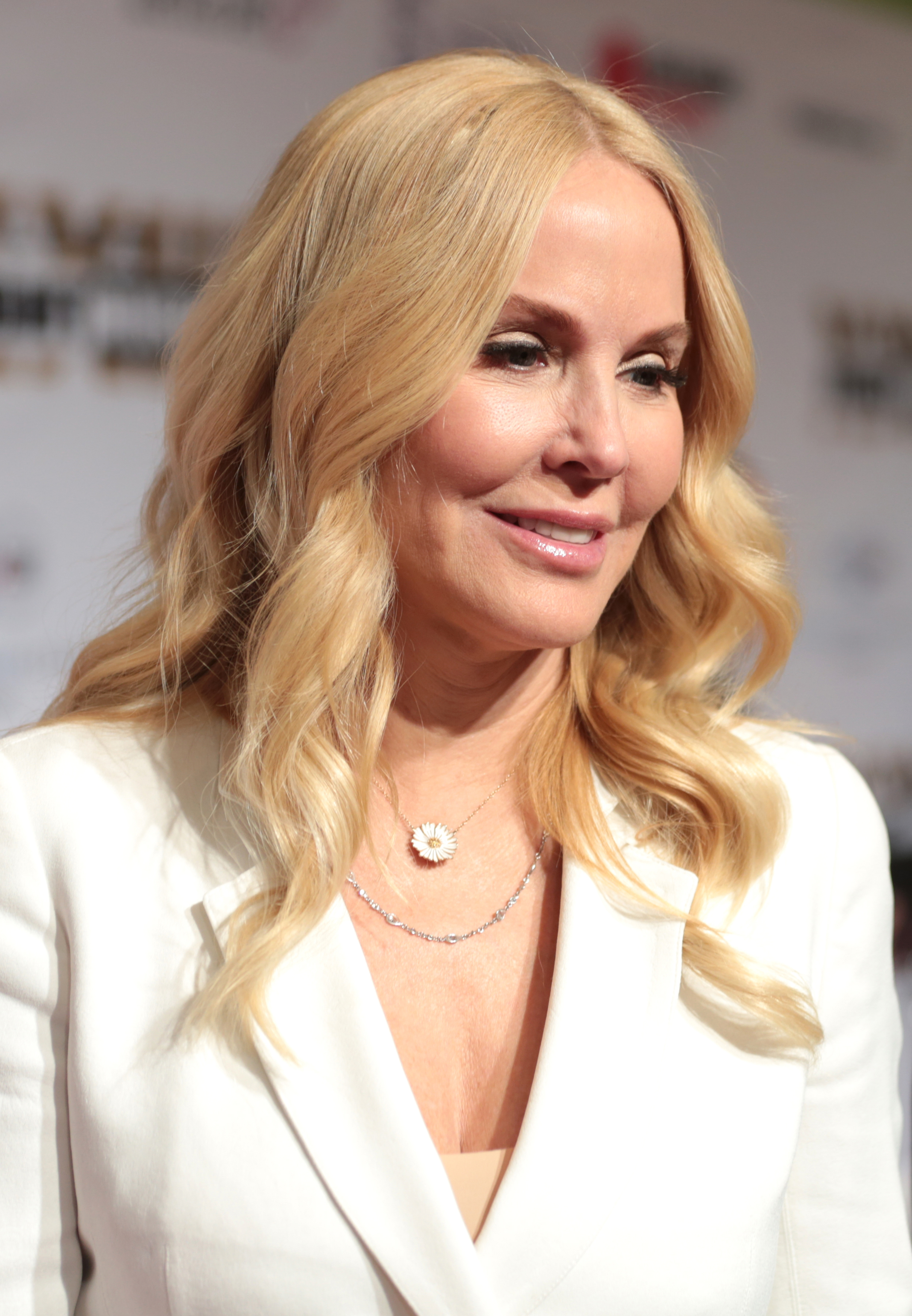

Personal details
- Born: May 13, 1957 (age 69) Houston, Texas, U.S.
- Height: 5 ft 8 in (1.73 m)

Eloise Broady (born May 13, 1957) is an American model and actress. She was chosen as Playboy's Playmate for April 1988. She is sometimes credited as: Eloise Dejoria, Eloise Schmitt, Elois DeJoria or Eloise DeJoria. She is married to John Paul DeJoria. Eloise appeared in the music video for Kiss' "Reason to Live".

== May ==
Diana Lee

Personal details
- Born: May 11, 1961 (age 65) Seattle, Washington, U.S.
- Height: 5 ft 7 in (1.70 m)

Diana Lee or Diana Lee-Hsu (born May 11, 1961) is an American model and actress. She was chosen as Playboy's Playmate of the Month for May 1988. Her centerfold was photographed by Stephen Wayda and Richard Fegley.

As an actress, she performed in several Playboy videos and had an appearance in the 1989 James Bond movie Licence to Kill. In the film, Lee played Loti, a Hong Kong narcotic agent. She also is prominently featured in the film's title sequence.

== June ==
Emily Arth

Personal details
- Born: October 18, 1960 (age 65) Evanston, Illinois, U.S.
- Height: 5 ft 7 in (1.70 m)

Emily Arth (born October 18, 1960, in Evanston, Illinois) is an American model and actress. She was chosen as Playboy's Playmate of the Month for June, 1988. Afterwards, under her married name of Emily Feinberg, she worked for the World Wrestling Federation as Vince McMahon's executive assistant. She left the company in 1991 and later testified against McMahon in his steroid distribution trial in 1994.

== July ==
Terri Lynn Doss

Personal details
- Born: September 4, 1965 (age 60) Chicago, Illinois, U.S.
- Height: 5 ft 6.5 in (1.69 m)

Terri Lynn Doss (born September 4, 1965) is an American model and actress. She was chosen as Playboy's Playmate of the Month for its July 1988 issue.

== August ==
Helle Michaelsen

Personal details
- Born: 2 November 1968 (age 57) Aalborg, Denmark
- Height: 5 ft 6 in (1.68 m)

Helle Michaelsen (born 2 November 1968 in Aalborg, Denmark) is a Danish model and actress. She was Playboy's Playmate of the Month for August 1988 and has appeared in numerous Playboy videos.

== September ==
Laura Richmond

Personal details
- Born: August 23, 1966 (age 59) Fort Dix, New Jersey, U.S.
- Height: 5 ft 3 in (1.60 m)

Laura Richmond (born August 23, 1966, in Fort Dix, New Jersey) is an American model and actress. She was chosen as Playboy's Playmate of the Month for September, 1988 and has appeared in some Playboy videos. She also portrayed Jessica Rabbit on the cover of the November 1988 issue.

== October ==
Shannon Long

Personal details
- Born: 11 February 1969 (age 57) Gladstone, Queensland, Australia
- Height: 5 ft 3 in (1.60 m)

Shannon Long (born 11 February 1969 in Gladstone, Queensland, Australia) is an Australian model and actress. She was chosen as Playboy magazine's Playmate of the Month for its October 1988 issue.

Soon after her 16th birthday she moved to Sydney, took up modeling and became Playmate in the Australian edition of Playboy in September 1985. Long did an encore pictorial in 1986, and represented Australia in the Playboy International Pageant in 1988.

She was the first Australian to appear as a Playmate in the U.S. edition. Her American success led to a second centerfold in the Australian edition in December 1988; she became the local "Playmate of the Year" in 1989 and appeared in another pictorial in 1992. She toured the US in the early 1990s promoting Australian beer.

== November ==
Pia Reyes

Personal details
- Born: July 3, 1964 (age 62) Manila, Philippines
- Height: 5 ft 8.5 in (1.74 m)

Maria Pia Agravante Reyes (born July 3, 1964, in Manila, Philippines) is a Filipino American model and actress. She was the November 1988 Playboy Playmate of the Month.

Reyes earned a Bachelor of Arts in advertising from Penn State University in 1984, where she also played on the women's lacrosse team. Reyes was once married to convicted con artist, Christophe Rocancourt, with whom she has a son, Zeus. On April 27, 2001, she and Rocancourt were arrested in Oak Bay, British Columbia, Canada, on charges of defrauding an elderly couple.

== December ==
Katariina Souri
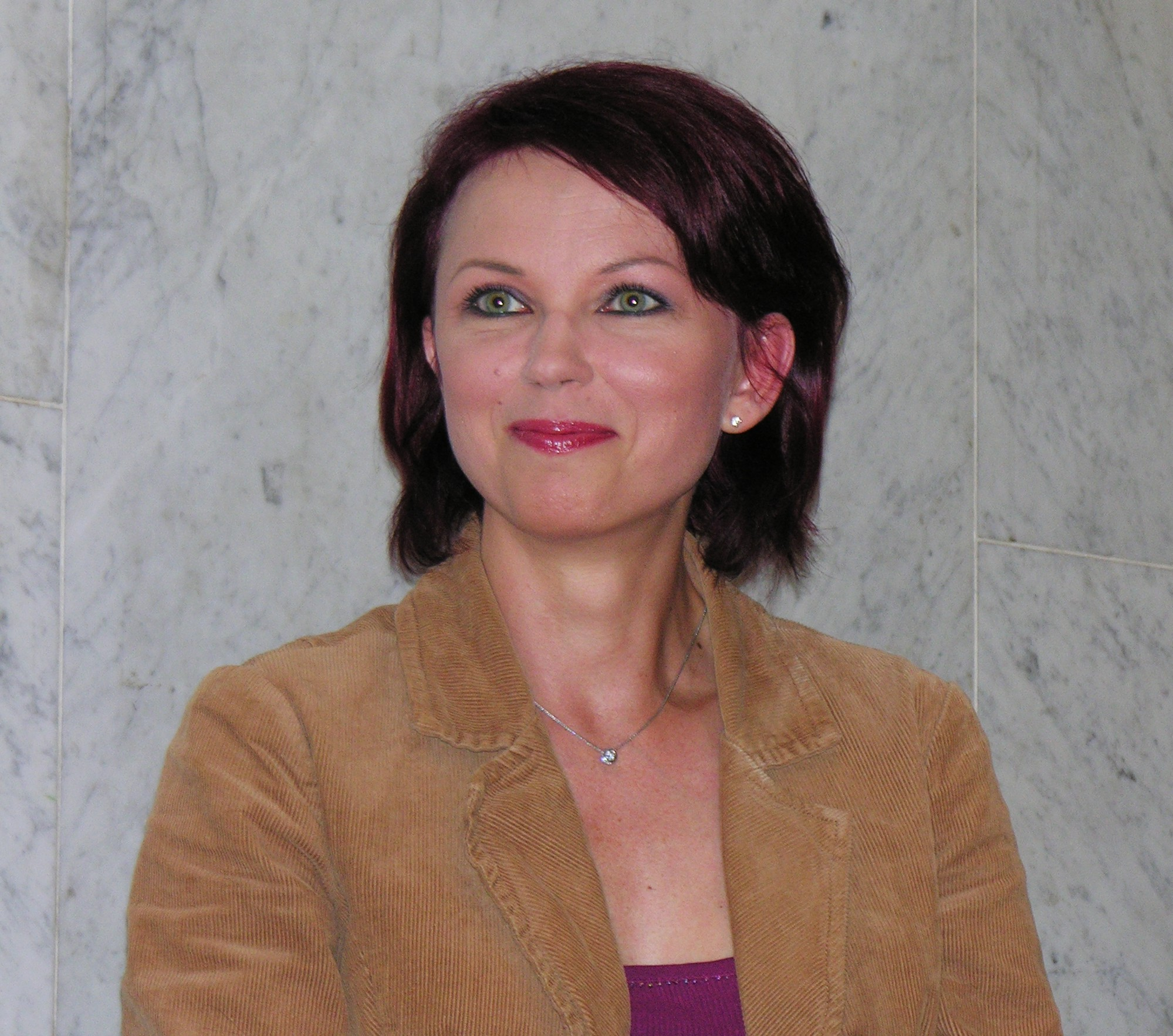
- Kata Kärkkäinen, August 2008

Personal details
- Born: 27 October 1968 (age 57) Helsinki, Finland
- Height: 5 ft 6 in (1.68 m)

Katariina Souri (born 27 October 1968 as Minna Katariina "Kata" Kärkkäinen) is a Finnish author, artist and columnist, who first gained fame as a glamour model and actress. She was chosen as Playboy's Playmate of the Month for December, 1988. After her modelling career, she worked as a writer in her native country, first as a television script writer and then as an author.

== See also ==
- List of people in Playboy 1980–1989

Kimberley Conrad	Kari Kennell	Susie Owens	Eloise Broady	Diana Lee	Emily Arth
Terri Lynn Doss	Helle Michaelsen	Laura Richmond	Shannon Long	Pia Reyes	Kata Kärkkäinen
