= List of people in Playboy 1980–1989 =

This list of people in Playboy 1980–1989 is a catalog of women and men who appeared in Playboy magazine in the years 1980 through 1989. Not all of the people featured in the magazine are pictured in the nude.

Entries in blue indicate that the issue marks the original appearance of that year's Playmate of the Year (PMOY).

== 1980 ==
Month	Cover model	Centerfold model	Interview subject	20 Questions	Pictorials
January	Steve Martin, Amy Miller, Michele Drake	Gig Gangel	Steve Martin		NFL Cheerleaders
February	Candace Collins	Sandy Cagle	Pat Caddell		Suzanne Somers (test nudes; Somers never actually became a centerfold model)
March	Bo Derek	Henriette Allais	Terry Bradshaw	Shelley Hack	Bo Derek, Melonie Haller
April	Shari Shattuck	Liz Glazowski	Linda Ronstadt		Women of the Armed Forces
May	Terri Welles	Martha Thomsen	Gay Talese		Miss World 1978 Silvana Suárez, Perfect Attendants (flight attendants)
June	Dorothy Stratten	Ola Ray	John Anderson		Dorothy Stratten – Playmate of the Year (PMOY), Fellini's Feminist Fantasy (the women of City of Women)
July	Sandra Dumas	Teri Peterson	Bruce Jenner	George Hamilton	
August	Bo Derek	Victoria Cooke	William Shockley		Bo Derek, Girls of Hawaii
September	Rita Lee	Lisa Welch	Roy Scheider		Evelyn Guerrero, Girls of the Southwest Conference
October	S.J. Fellowes	Mardi Jacquet	G. Gordon Liddy		Lisa Lyon, Girls of Canada
November	Mardi Jacquet	Jeana Tomasino	Larry Hagman	Michael Douglas	Beauty and Bureaucracy (women of the U.S. government)
December	none	Terri Welles	George C. Scott	Truman Capote	Linda Kerridge

== 1981 ==
Month	Cover model	Centerfold model	Interview subject	20 Questions	Pictorials
January	Barbara Bach	Karen Price	John Lennon & Yoko Ono		Barbara Bach, Honky-Tonk Angels (urban cowgirls)
February	Terri Welles, Candy Loving, Sondra Theodore	Vicki Lynn Lasseter	Tom Snyder		Marie Helvin, Playmate Roommates: Terri Welles, Candy Loving, and Sondra Theodore
March	Tricia Barnstable, Cybil Barnstable	Kymberly Herrin	James Garner	Lauren Hutton	Twins: Cybil and Tricia Barnstable, Sheila and Moira Stone, Piper and Tara Perry, Lynette and Leigh Harris (or Lyn and Leigh Holiday), Jo Penney
April	Liz Wickersham	Lorraine Michaels	Ed Asner		Rita Jenrette, The Girls of Kokomo, Indiana
May	Miss World winner Gabriella Brum	Gina Goldberg	Elisabeth Kübler-Ross	John DeLorean	Dorothy Stratten, Miss World Gabriella Brum, Girls of the Adriatic Coast
June	Terri Welles	Cathy Larmouth	Steve Garvey	Jack Lemmon	Terri Welles – PMOY, the women of For Your Eyes Only
July	Jayne Kennedy	Heidi Sorenson	Robert Garwood	Jayne Kennedy	
August	Valerie Perrine	Debbie Boostrom	George Gilder	Joan Rivers	Valerie Perrine
September	Bo Derek	Susan Smith	James Michener		Bo Derek
October	Cathy St. George	Kelly Tough	Donald Sutherland		Maud Adams
November	Teri Peterson	Shannon Tweed	Oriana Fallaci		Vikki LaMotta
December	Bernadette Peters	Patricia Farinelli	Henry Fonda	John Kenneth Galbraith	Bernadette Peters

== 1982 ==
Month	Cover model	Centerfold model	Interview subject	20 Questions	Pictorials
January	Natalie Levy Bencheton	Kimberly McArthur	George Carlin	John Matuszak	Ursula Andress, Linda Evans, Bo Derek
February	Kimberly McArthur	Anne-Marie Fox	Lech Wałęsa	Karen Allen	Sylvia Kristel
March	Barbara Carrera	Karen Witter	Patricia Hearst	Louis Rukeyser	Barbara Carrera, Melanie Martin
April	Mariel Hemingway	Linda Rhys Vaughn	Ed Koch	James Woods	Mariel Hemingway, Henriette Allais
May	Vickie Reigle	Kym Malin	Billy Joel	SCTV: John Candy, Andrea Martin, Eugene Levy, Rick Moranis, Dave Thomas, Joe Flaherty and Catherine O'Hara	Rae Dawn Chong, Barbara Schantz (Springfield, Ohio police officer)
June	Shannon Tweed	Lourdes Estores	Sugar Ray Leonard	Brandon Tartikoff	Shannon Tweed – PMOY
July	Lynda Wiesmeier	Lynda Wiesmeier	Bette Davis	Stevie Nicks	
August	Vicki McCarty	Cathy St. George	Akio Morita	Mariette Hartley	Marilyn Michaels, Summer Sex '82
September	Kymberly Herrin	Connie Brighton	Cheech and Chong	Tom Petty	
October	Tanya Roberts	Marianne Gravatte	Robin Williams	John LeBoutillier	Tanya Roberts
November	Lorraine Michaels	Marlene Janssen	Luciano Pavarotti	Frank and Moon Unit Zappa	Women of Braniff
December	Marcy Hanson	Charlotte Kemp	Julie Andrews & Blake Edwards		Sydne Rome

== 1983 ==
Month	Cover model	Centerfold model	Interview subject	20 Questions	Pictorials
January	Audrey Landers, Judy Landers	Lonny Chin	Dudley Moore	Herschel Walker	Audrey Landers, Judy Landers, Shannon Tweed
February	Kim Basinger	Melinda Mays	Gabriel García Márquez	Yakov Smirnoff	Kim Basinger
March	Kimberly McArthur, Kelly Tough, Karen Witter	Alana Soares	Sam Donaldson	Arthur Jones	
April	Carrie Leigh	Christina Ferguson	Paul Newman	Al McGuire	Pamela Bellwood, Ladies of Spain, Donna King
May	Nastassja Kinski	Susie Scott Krabacher	Ansel Adams	Charlton Heston	Nastassja Kinski
June	Marianne Gravatte	Jolanda Egger	Stephen King	Debra Winger	Marianne Gravatte – PMOY, Morganna
July	Ruth Guerri	Ruth Guerri	Earl Weaver	Carrie Fisher	Bond Girls, Erogenous Parts (photography of Francis Giacobetti)
August	Sybil Danning	Carina Persson	Ted Turner	Jan Stephenson	Sybil Danning
September	Kymberly Herrin	Barbara Edwards	Sandinistas: Sergio Ramírez, Ernesto Cardenal, Tomas Borge Martinez	Randy Newman	Girls of the Atlantic Coast Conference
October	Charlotte Kemp	Tracy Vaccaro	Cast/crew of Hill Street Blues: Bruce Weitz, Veronica Hamel, Daniel J. Travanti, Charles Haid, Michael Warren, James B. Sikking, Betty Thomas, Ed Marinaro, Taurean Blacque, Kiel Martin, Steven Bochco, René Enríquez, Joe Spano, Barbara Bosson and Michael Conrad	Joe Piscopo	Loretta Martin
November	Donna Ann	Veronica Gamba	Kenny Rogers	Bubba Smith	
December	Joan Collins	Terry Nihen	Tom Selleck		Joan Collins

== 1984 ==
Month	Cover model	Centerfold model	Interview subject	20 Questions	Pictorials
January	no model pictured	Penny Baker	Dan Rather		Mariel Hemingway in Star 80
February	Kimberly McArthur	Justine Greiner	Paul Simon	Shelley Long	Carol Wayne
March	Susie Scott Krabacher	Dona Speir	Moses Malone	Bridgette Monet	Bridgette Monet
April	Kathy Shower	Lesa Ann Pedriana	Joan Collins	Martin Mull	Sydney Krueger
May	Rita Jenrette, Phillip Anderson	Patty Duffek	Calvin Klein		Rita Jenrette, Vicki LaMotta, Ola Ray
June	Barbara Edwards	Tricia Lange	Jesse Jackson	Siskel and Ebert	Barbara Edwards – PMOY
July	Bo Derek	Liz Stewart	Walid Jumblat	Fran Lebowitz	Bo Derek, Robin Avener
August	Terry Moore	Suzi Schott	Bobby Knight	Kurt Russell	Terry Moore
September	Kimberly Evenson	Kimberly Evenson	Shirley MacLaine		Anne Carlisle
October	Lesa Pedriana	Debi Johnson	David Letterman	Jack La Lanne	Sônia Braga
November	Christie Brinkley	Roberta Vasquez	José Napoleón Duarte	Leigh Steinberg	Christie Brinkley
December	Suzanne Somers	Karen Velez	Paul and Linda McCartney		Suzanne Somers

== 1985 ==
Month	Cover model	Centerfold model	Interview subject	20 Questions	Pictorials
January	Goldie Hawn	Joan Bennett	Diane Lane		
February	Julie McCullough	Cherie Witter	Steve Jobs	Brian De Palma	Janice Dickinson
March	Shannon Tweed	Donna Smith	Cast of 60 Minutes: Harry Reasoner, Mike Wallace, Morley Safer, Dan Rather and Diane Sawyer	Bob Giraldi	
April	Natalie Smith, Donna Smith	Cindy Brooks	Wayne Gretzky	Joel Hyatt	
May	Karen Velez	Kathy Shower	Boy George	Marvin Hagler and Thomas Hearns	Vanity, Karen Velez – PMOY
June	Roxanne Pulitzer	Devin DeVasquez	Sparky Anderson	Tom Watson	Roxanne Pulitzer
July	Tracy Vaccaro	Hope Marie Carlton	Rob Reiner	Jamie Lee Curtis	Grace Jones
August	Kathy Shower	Cher Butler	Fidel Castro	Ron Howard	Judy Norton-Taylor
September	Madonna	Venice Kong	John Huston	Billy Crystal	Madonna, Brigitte Nielsen
October	Sherry Arnett	Cynthia Brimhall	John DeLorean	Rosanna Arquette	Jerry Hall
November	Teri Weigel	Pamela Saunders	Sting	Don Johnson and Philip Michael Thomas	
December	Barbi Benton	Carol Ficatier	Bill Cosby	Huey Lewis	Barbi Benton

== 1986 ==
Month	Cover model	Centerfold model	Interview subject	20 Questions	Pictorials
January	no model pictured	Sherry Arnett	Ruth Westheimer (Dr. Ruth)	Jay Leno	Iman, Melanie Griffith
February	Cherie Witter	Julie McCullough	Michael Douglas	Anthony Pellicano	
March	Sally Field	Kim Morris	Sally Field	David Byrne	
April	Shannon Tweed	Teri Weigel	Jeffrey MacDonald		Victoria Sellers (daughter of Peter Sellers), Alexandrea Mosca
May	Kathleen Turner	Christine Richters	Kathleen Turner	Kim Basinger	
June	Kathy Shower	Rebecca Ferratti	Kareem Abdul-Jabbar	Al Unser and Al Unser Jr.	Kathy Shower – PMOY, Linda Evans
July	Carrie Leigh	Lynne Austin	Arthur C. Clarke	Tom Cruise	Carrie Leigh, Brenda Venus
August	Lillian Müller	Ava Fabian	Jackie Gleason	Sigourney Weaver	Brigitte Nielsen
September	Julie McCullough	Rebekka Armstrong	Carl Bernstein	Gregory Hines	Marla Collins, Farmers' Daughters
October	Sharon Kaye	Katherine Hushaw	Phil Collins	Jim McMahon	Wendy O. Williams
November	Devin DeVasquez	Donna Edmondson	Joan Rivers	David Horowitz	Devin DeVasquez
December	Brooke Shields	Laurie Carr	Bryant Gumbel	Koko	Barbara Crampton

== 1987 ==
Month	Cover model	Centerfold model	Interview subject	20 Questions	Pictorials
January	no model pictured	Luann Lee	Don Johnson	John Fogerty	Jane Seymour, Elisa Florez
February	JoAnne Russell	Julie Peterson	Mickey Rourke	Ed Begley Jr.	Stephanie Beacham
March	Janet Jones	Marina Baker	Lionel Richie	Bob Vila	Janet Jones, MiSchelle Mcmindes
April	Ava Fabian	Anna Clark	Louis Rukeyser	Rae Dawn Chong	
May	Vanna White	Kymberly Paige	Norodom Sihanouk	Barbara Hershey	Vanna White, Melissa Prophet
June	Donna Edmondson	Sandy Greenberg	Whoopi Goldberg	Michael J. Fox	Donna Edmondson – PMOY, Jenilee Harrison
July	Sandy Greenberg	Carmen Berg	Wade Boggs	Garry Shandling	Ellen Stohl
August	Paulina Porizkova	Sharry Konopski	Imelda Marcos & Ferdinand Marcos	David Lee Roth	Paulina Porizkova Calendar Preview (not nude)
September	Maryam d'Abo, Kim Basinger, Beth Hyatt, Timothy Dalton	Gwen Hajek	John Sculley	Penn and Teller	Maryam d'Abo
October	Brandi Brandt	Brandi Brandt	Richard Secord	Bob Uecker	Donna Mills
November	Jessica Hahn	Pam Stein	Daniel Ortega	Kelly McGillis	Jessica Hahn
December	Brigitte Nielsen	India Allen	Gore Vidal	Justine Bateman	Brigitte Nielsen

== 1988 ==
Month	Cover model	Centerfold model	Interview subject	20 Questions	Pictorials
January	no model pictured	Kimberley Conrad	Arnold Schwarzenegger	Susan Dey	Kim Basinger
February	Sandy Greenberg	Kari Kennell	Oliver Stone	Harold Washington	
March	Terri Lynn Doss	Susie Owens	Billy Crystal	Tom Waits	Janice Dickinson
April	Vanity	Eloise Broady	Tom Clancy	Harrison Ford	Vanity
May	Laurie Carr	Diana Lee	Don King	Teri Garr	Denise Crosby
June	India Allen	Emily Arth	Chevy Chase	Theresa Russell	India Allen – PMOY, Phoebe Legere
July	Cindy Crawford	Terri Lynn Doss	Paul Hogan	Judge Reinhold	Cindy Crawford
August	Kimberley Conrad	Helle Michaelsen	Harry Edwards	Harvey Fierstein	
September	Jessica Hahn	Laura Richmond	Yasser Arafat	Tracey Ullman	Jessica Hahn
October	Terri Lynn Doss	Shannon Long	Roger Craig	Morton Downey Jr.	Playgirl editor-in-chief Nancie S. Martin
November	Laura Richmond	Pia Reyes	Bruce Willis	John Cleese	
December	Kata Kärkkäinen	Kata Kärkkäinen	Cher	Gene Simmons	Lysette Anthony

== 1989 ==
Month	Cover model	Centerfold model	Interview subject	20 Questions	Pictorials
January	Marilyn Monroe	Fawna MacLaren	Robert De Niro		
February	Michele Smith	Simone Eden	Bob Woodward	Andrea Marcovicci	Samantha Fox
March	La Toya Jackson	Laurie Wood	Tom Hanks	Fred Dryer	La Toya Jackson, Pamela Des Barres
April	Erika Eleniak	Jennifer Lyn Jackson	The IRA: Danny Morrison and Gerry Adams	Mario Lemieux	
May	Natalya Negoda	Monique Noel	Susan Sarandon	Richard Lewis	Natalya Negoda
June	Kimberley Conrad	Tawnni Cable	Edward James Olmos	Nicolas Cage	Dana Plato, Kimberley Conrad – PMOY
July	Shelly Jamison	Erika Eleniak	Barry Diller	William Shatner	Shelly Jamison
August	Brandi Brandt	Gianna Amore	John Cougar Mellencamp	John Candy	Stephen Wayda's wife Diana Lee
September	Karin and Mirjam van Breeschooten	Karin and Mirjam van Breeschooten	Keith Hernandez	Jeff Daniels	Morganna, KC Winkler
October	Pamela Anderson	Karen Foster	Keith Richards	Geena Davis	Julie McCullough,
November	Donna Mills	Renee Tenison	Garry Kasparov	Bonnie Raitt	Donna Mills
December	Candice Bergen	Petra Verkaik	Candice Bergen	Patti D'Arbanville	Karen Mayo-Chandler

== See also ==
- List of Playboy Playmates of the Month
- List of people in Playboy 2000–2009
