= List of Playboy Playmates of 1989 =

The following is a list of Playboy Playmates of 1989, the 35th anniversary year of the publication. Playboy magazine names its Playmate of the Month each month throughout the year.

== January ==
Fawna MacLaren

Personal details
- Born: December 18, 1965 (age 60) Santa Monica, California, U.S.
- Height: 5 ft 10 in (1.78 m)

Fawna MacLaren (born December 18, 1965, in Santa Monica, California) is an American model and actress. She was chosen as Playboy's Playmate of the Month for January 1989.

She was selected as Playboy's 35th Anniversary Playmate after a nationwide search. She was paid $35,000 for her centerfold. Several years later, she appeared in one of Playboy's Wet & Wild home videos.

== February ==
Simone Eden

Personal details
- Born: June 14, 1970 (age 56) Arcadia, California, U.S.
- Height: 5 ft 5.5 in (1.66 m)

Simone Fleurice Eden (born Simone Howe on June 14, 1970, in Arcadia, California) is an American model and actress. She was chosen as Playboy's Playmate of the Month for its February 1989 issue. She is the first Playmate whose mother (Carol Eden) had also been a Playmate of the Month: as a result, the two appeared together on an episode of the 2006 revival of the TV series I've Got A Secret.

== March ==
Laurie Jo Wood

Personal details
- Born: June 23, 1967 (age 59) Orange, California, U.S.
- Height: 5 ft 10 in (1.78 m)

Laurie Jo Wood (born June 23, 1967, in Orange, California) is an American model and actress. She was chosen as Playboy's Playmate of the Month for its March 1989 issue.

== April ==
Jennifer Lyn Jackson

Personal details
- Born: March 21, 1969 Cleveland, Ohio, U.S.
- Died: January 22, 2010 (aged 40) Westlake, Ohio, U.S.
- Height: 5 ft 7 in (1.70 m)

Jennifer Lyn Jackson (March 21, 1969 – January 22, 2010) of Cleveland, Ohio, was Playboy magazine's Playmate of the Month for April 1989. She was also one of three finalists for the magazine's 35th Anniversary pictorial. Outtakes from her Playmate pictorial, which was shot by Arny Freytag, appeared in Playboy Special Editions several times following her centerfold appearance.

Jackson graduated from North Olmsted High School in 1986 and went on to study business and finance at Kent State University.

A long time drug addict, on January 22, 2010, Jackson was found dead from a heroin overdose by her husband, James Thompson, in their trailer park home in Westlake, Ohio.

== May ==
Monique Noel

Personal details
- Born: April 28, 1967 (age 59) Salem, Oregon, U.S.
- Height: 5 ft 7 in (1.70 m)

Monique Noel (born April 28, 1967, in Salem, Oregon) is a glamour model and actress. She was chosen as Playboy's Playmate of the Month for May 1989. Her centerfold was photographed by Richard Fegley.

== June ==
Tawnni Cable

Personal details
- Born: May 1, 1967 (age 59) Salem, Oregon, U.S.
- Height: 5 ft 9 in (1.75 m)

Tawnni Cable (born 1 May 1967 in Salem, Oregon) is an American model and actress. She was chosen as Playboy's Playmate of the Month for June, 1989 and has appeared in numerous Playboy videos. She played a small role in an episode of The Fresh Prince of Bel-Air and appeared with four other Playmates on an all-star episode of Family Feud.

== July ==
Erika Eleniak
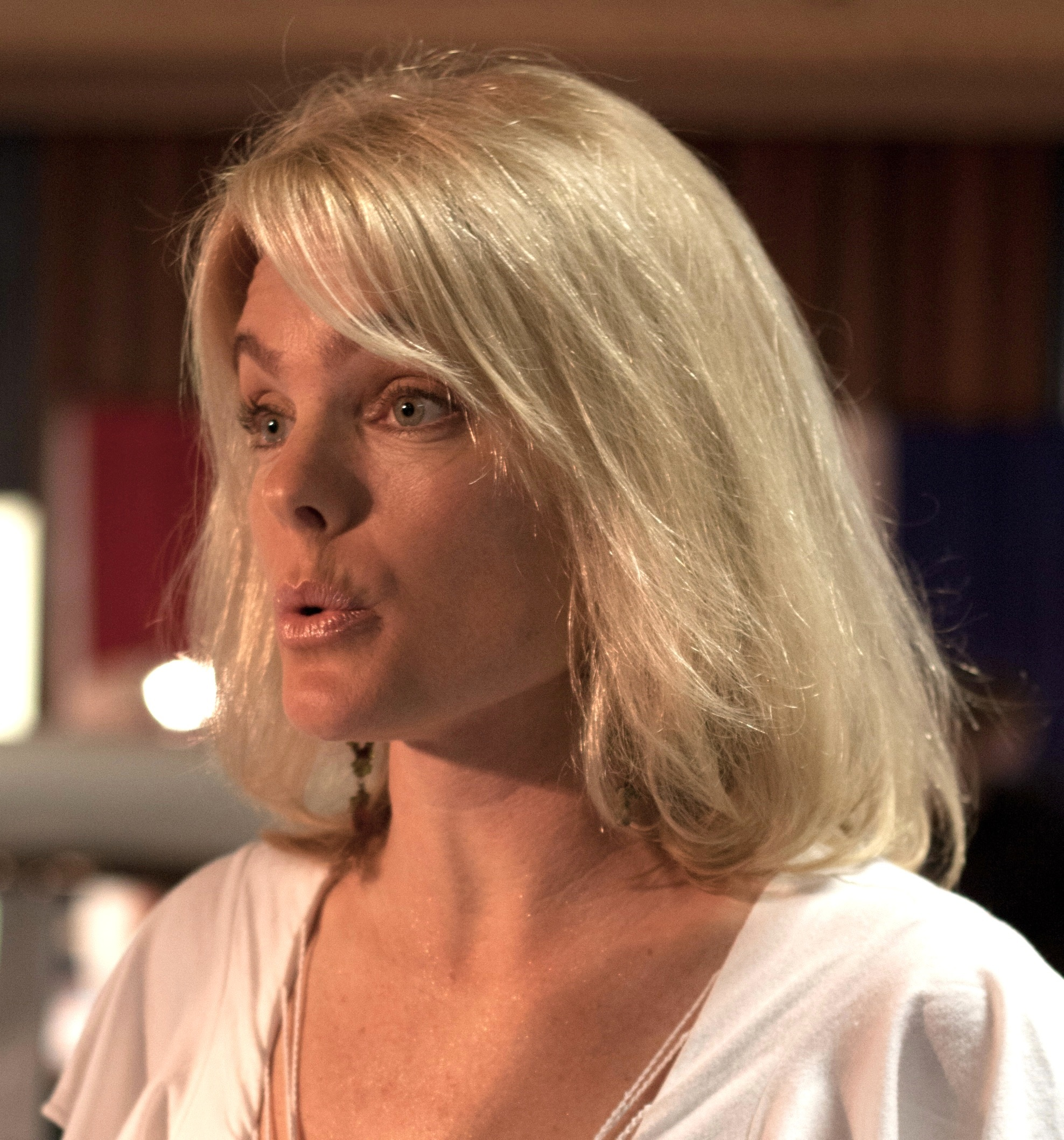

Personal details
- Born: September 29, 1969 (age 57) Glendale, California, U.S.
- Height: 5 ft 6 in (1.68 m)

Erika Eleniak (born September 29, 1969) is an American Playboy Playmate and actress, perhaps best known for her role in Baywatch as Shauni McClain. Eleniak had several roles in television before her Playmate selection. Playboy featured her on two covers and later as the centerfold in the July 1989 issue.

== August ==
Gianna Amore

Personal details
- Born: April 5, 1968 Warwick, Rhode Island, U.S.
- Died: February 27, 2024 (aged 55)
- Height: 5 ft 7 in (1.70 m)

Jennifer Ellen Amoroso Smith (April 5, 1968 – February 27, 2024), better known as Gianna Amore, was an American model and actress. She was chosen as Playboy's Playmate of the Month for August, 1989 and appeared in Playboy videos. She was of Italian descent. Amore died on February 27, 2024, at the age of 55.

== September ==
Karin and Mirjam van Breeschooten

Personal details
- Born: 15 November 1970 (age 55) Rotterdam, Netherlands
- Height: 5 ft 5 in (1.65 m)

Karin and Mirjam van Breeschooten (born 15 November 1970 in Rotterdam, Netherlands) are twin sisters who were Playboy magazine's Playmates of the Month for September 1989.

== October ==
Karen Foster

Personal details
- Born: April 21, 1965 (age 61) Lufkin, Texas, U.S.
- Height: 5 ft 4 in (1.63 m)

Karen Foster (born April 21, 1965, in Lufkin, Texas) is an American model and actress. She was chosen as Playboy's Playmate of the Month for October, 1989.

== November ==
Renee Tenison

Playboy Playmate of the Year
- 1990
- Preceded by: Kimberley Conrad
- Succeeded by: Lisa Matthews

Personal details
- Born: December 2, 1968 (age 57) Caldwell, Idaho, U.S.
- Height: 5 ft 6 in (1.68 m)

Reneé Tenison (born December 2, 1968, in Caldwell, Idaho) is an American model and actress.

Reneé has three older brothers and an identical twin sister, Rosie, who also works as a model. Rosie and Renee posed in the August 2002 issue of Playboy together.

Tenison appeared as the Playmate of the Month in the November 1989 issue of Playboy magazine and was subsequently named Playmate of the Year for 1990, the first PMOY of African American descent. In 2001, she was selected as one of the ten sexiest women of the year by the readers of Black Men magazine.

In May 2017, at the age of 48, Tenison duplicated her Playmate of the Year cover along with her cohorts Kimberley Conrad, Candace Collins, Lisa Matthews, Cathy St. George, Charlotte Kemp, and Monique St. Pierre nearly three decades on.

== December ==
Petra Verkaik

Personal details
- Born: November 4, 1966 (age 60) Los Angeles, California, U.S.
- Height: 5 ft 8 in (1.73 m)

Petra Charlotte Verkaik (/ˈpeɪtrə vərˈkaɪk/ PAYT-rah-ver-KIKE; born November 4, 1966) is a model. Born and raised in Los Angeles, she attended acting classes. She needed a head shot and did a trade with a photographer to get free headshots in exchange for clothed modeling for him. The photographer sent her photographs to Playboy who called her to work with them. In an interview with the Las Vegas Sun, Verkaik expressed that she never wanted to do nude modeling and that she thought "all those girls were whores and sluts." Three months later, she was Playmate of the Month for December 1989 after first appearing in the Great Playmate Hunt Special Edition in February 1989.

Verkaik started her own production company in 1995, called Pin-Up Girls, making her the first Playboy model to start her own production company instead of producing videos strictly through Playboy. Pin-Up Girls produced videos and calendars. Starting the company left her $60,000 in debt. In 1997, she was named Playboy Model of the Year. In 2001, the readers of Playboy voted her "the sexiest Playmate of the 1980s." Verkaik made numerous minor movie and television appearances. In the early 1990s, Verkaik had minor roles in Pyrates and Love Potion No. 9. In 1996, Verkaik starred in an episode of Married... with Children. In 1999, Verkaik starred in the science fiction comedy Galaxy Quest, but her role was ultimately cut from the theatrical release.

In January 2002, Verkaik attended the Foothill High School prom in Tustin, California, with a 17-year-old high school student named Toby Hocking. Hocking wrote a college essay, and Verkaik was given it by a friend who told her that he could not get a prom date. Verkaik read the college essay and offered to be Hocking's date, which garnered publicity. The headmaster of Foothill High School had no issue with Verkaik being Hocking's date, provided she did not wear anything "strapless or sheer".

== See also ==
- List of people in Playboy 1980–1989

Fawna MacLaren	Simone Eden	Laurie Wood	Jennifer Lyn Jackson	Monique Noel	Tawnni Cable
Erika Eleniak	Gianna Amore	Karin and Mirjam van Breeschooten	Karen Foster	Renee Tenison	Petra Verkaik
