= Sharry Konopski =

American model and actress (1967–2017)

- DeBolt at Glamourcon 19, 1999

Playboy centerfold appearance
- August 1987
- Preceded by: Carmen Berg
- Succeeded by: Gwen Hajek

Personal details
- Born: Sharry Lynn Konopski; December 2, 1967 Longview, Washington
- Died: August 25, 2017 (aged 49) Silver Lake, Washington
- Height: 5 ft 2 in (157 cm)

Sharry Lynn Konopski (married name DeBolt; December 2, 1967 – August 25, 2017) was an American model and actress. She was chosen as Playboy's Playmate of the Month in August 1987 and appeared in numerous Playboy videos. She posed nude again for Playboy in the March 1997 issue, despite being paralyzed.

== Early life ==
Konopski was born on December 2, 1967, in Longview, Washington. Her father worked there in logging. After graduation, she remained in her hometown, working as a waitress at Bruno's Pizzeria.

== Career ==
Playboy magazine selected Konopski as Playmate of the Month for their August 1987 issue, with her centerfold photographed by Stephen Wayda. The following year, Playboy featured her, along with four other Playmates, in a pictorial by Arny Freytag. She reappeared in a photo shoot by Freytag for Playboy's March 1997 issue.

She also appeared on The Sally Jessy Raphael Show to discuss her injuries.

== Personal life ==
On April 1, 1995, as she was driving home from work on the Spirit Lake Memorial Highway, three deer ran into the road, and she rolled her Ford Mustang. Her spinal injuries left her paralyzed from the waist down.

DeBolt died in Silver Lake, Washington, on August 25, 2017, aged 49, of complications from pneumonia and lung cancer. She is survived by her husband, Joseph Randall, and two children from her first marriage to Mark DeBolt, Spencer and Siera.

== See also ==
- List of people in Playboy 1980–1989

Luann Lee	Julie Peterson	Marina Baker	Anna Clark	Kymberly Paige	Sandy Greenberg
Carmen Berg	Sharry Konopski	Gwen Hajek	Brandi Brandt	Pamela Stein	India Allen
