= AmIAnnoying.com =

Website that allows users to vote on celebrities

- Website type: Entertainment
- Available in: English
- Website: amiannoying.com
- Launched: 2000

AmIAnnoying.com (AIA) is a website that allows users to vote on celebrities based on their annoyance factors. It has more than 30,000 profiles of public figures and is the largest on-going celebrity polling site on the internet.

== Overview ==
While most of the entries on the site consist of individuals, groups such as bands, sports teams and television series have their own entries on the site. Even AmIAnnoying.com has its own profile, where in its early years it got mostly annoying votes.

AIA keeps track of the votes cast and produces two on-going lists of the 100 celebrities who have the highest and lowest annoying percentages. Each week, AIA takes the top 25 in both lists and use them to compile the year-end "most annoying of the year" and "least annoying of the year" lists. Though in years past the voting totals were not reset until the end of the year, they started to reset the polls each week in 2006. AIA has been used by several media outlets to measure the public perception of the celebrity in their articles. The poll is not scientific and there have been instances of ballot stuffing despite the five-vote-per-visit rule given by AIA.

Lawyers representing the Church of Scientology threatened legal action for the usage of a picture of its founder L. Ron Hubbard, forcing AIA to alter the picture. Due to a family request, AIA also removed a profile of Matthew Shepard and it no longer accepts profiles of those famous only because they were murdered.

At the end of 2004, the tabloid magazine Star had an issue devoted to the "Most Annoying People of 2004", with Britney Spears and Paris Hilton at the top of the list. It had no affiliation with AmIAnnoying.com and it is not known if Star lifted that idea from the site or it was merely coincidental. AIA used the slogan "The Original and Interactive Annoying Celebrity Poll" after the Star issue came out.

AmIAnnoying.com was featured in the 2007 documentary Heckler.

It was announced on April 24, 2010, that co-founder Bruce Goldman had died earlier that week.

== Annual lists ==
=== Most Annoying of the Year ===
Most Annoying of the Year
Year	Most Annoying	Top Ten	Ref.
2001	Jesse Jackson	2nd: Osama bin Laden; 3rd: Yoko Ono; 4th: Miss Cleo; 5th: Tori Spelling; 6th: Allen Iverson; 7th: George W. Bush; 8th: Ruhollah Khomeini; 9th: Saddam Hussein; 10th: Kathie Lee Gifford	
2002	Martha Stewart	2nd: Ainsley Harriott; 3rd: Sheryl Swoopes; 4th: Sal Governale; 5th: Tina Arena; 6th: Christopher Lowell; 7th: John Edward; 8th: Nostradamus; 9th: Noelle Bush; 10th: Ben Curtis	
2003	Al-Qaeda	2nd: Michael Jackson; 3rd: Rush Limbaugh; 4th: Saddam Hussein; 5th: Bill Parcells; 6th: Osama bin Laden; 7th: Martha Stewart; 8th: Jacques Chirac; 9th: Timothy McVeigh; 10th: Jillian Barberie	
2004	Justin Timberlake	2nd: Britney Spears; 3rd: Michael Jackson; 4th: Phil McGraw; 5th: Osama bin Laden; 6th: Scott Peterson; 7th: Star Jones; 8th: Laura Schlessinger; 9th: Paris Hilton; 10th: Al-Qaeda	
2005	Tom Cruise	2nd: Michael Jackson; 3rd: Paris Hilton; 4th: Britney Spears; 5th: Osama bin Laden; 6th: Al-Qaeda; 7th: Phil McGraw; 8th: Tara Reid; 9th: Kobe Bryant; 10th: Jessica Simpson	
2006 (celebrities)	Star Jones	2nd: Donald Trump; 3rd: Paris Hilton; 4th: Michael Jackson; 5th: Justin Timberlake; 6th: Stacy Keibler; 7th: Phil McGraw; 8th: Oprah Winfrey; 9th: Lindsay Lohan; 10th: Tom Cruise	
2006 (public figures)	Osama bin Laden	2nd: Adolf Hitler; 3rd: Al-Qaeda; 4th: Pat Robertson; 5th: Hezbollah; 6th: Bill O'Reilly; 7th: PETA; 8th: Karl Rove; 9th: Dick Cheney; 10th: Ann Coulter	
2007 (celebrities)	Lindsay Lohan	2nd: Star Jones; 3rd: Britney Spears; 4th: Paris Hilton; 5th: Fergie; 6th: Donald Trump; 7th: Jessica Simpson; 8th: Ashlee Simpson; 9th: Barry Bonds; 10th: Michael Jackson	
2007 (public figures)	Osama bin Laden	2nd: Al-Qaeda; 3rd: Dick Cheney; 4th: Al Sharpton; 5th: Rudy Giuliani; 6th: Condoleezza Rice; 7th: Mitt Romney; 8th: Debbie Schlussel; 9th: Bill O'Reilly; 10th: Ann Coulter	
2008	Tila Tequila	2nd: Tom Cruise; 3rd: Barry Bonds; 4th: Osama bin Laden; 5th: Paris Hilton; 6th: Donald Trump; 7th: Jeremiah Wright; 8th: Nicole Richie; 9th: Britney Spears; 10th: New England	
2009	Katie Couric	2nd: Oprah Winfrey; 3rd: Alex Rodriguez; 4th: Osama bin Laden; 5th: China; 6th: Ted Kennedy; 7th: Rosie O'Donnell; 8th: Kobe Bryant; 9th: Al-Qaeda; 10th: Sean Penn	
2010	Osama bin Laden	2nd: Jay Leno; 3rd: Chris Tucker; 4th: Al-Qaeda; 5th: Donald Trump; 6th: Mahmoud Ahmadinejad; 7th: Jeff Zucker; 8th: Karl Marx; 9th: Michael Moore; 10th: Am I Annoying – Voters	
2011	Jay Leno	2nd: Am I Annoying – Voters; 3rd: Oprah Winfrey; 4th: Chris Tucker; 5th: Elisabeth Hasselbeck; 6th: National Basketball Association; 7th: Suzanne Somers; 8th: Osama bin Laden; 9th: Fox News; 10th: Josh Hamilton	
2012	Jay Leno	2nd: Teri Weigel; 3rd: L. Ron Hubbard; 4th: Osama bin Laden; 5th: Scientology; 6th: Allen West; 7th: Michael Bloomberg; 8th: Cindy Sheehan; 9th: Victoria Jackson; 10th: Jerry Sandusky	
2013	Stacy Keibler	2nd: Al-Qaeda; 3rd: Jennifer Lopez; 4th: Harry Reid; 5th: Bar Refaeli; 6th: Taliban; 7th: Kate Upton; 8th: Joe Biden; 9th: National Basketball Association; 10th: McKayla Maroney	
2014	Rachel Maddow	2nd: Stacy Keibler; 3rd: Justin Bieber; 4th: Majandra Delfino; 5th: The Voice; 6th: Teri Weigel; 7th: Joe Biden; 8th: Beau Biden; 9th: Mother Teresa; 10th: Lucy Lawless	
2015	Roger Goodell	2nd: Bill Belichick; 3rd: New England Patriots; 4th: Tom Brady; 5th: Robert Kraft; 6th: Am I Annoying – Voters; 7th: Rob Gronkowski; 8th: Sajida Mubarak Atrous al-Rishawi; 9th: Skip Bayless; 10th: Jennifer Lopez	
2016	Good Morning America	2nd: Stephanie Rawlings-Blake; 3rd: MSNBC; 4th: Osama bin Laden; 5th: Parker Posey; 6th: Beyoncé; 7th: Caitlyn Jenner; 8th: Josh Duggar; 9th: George Stephanopoulos; 10th: Ryan Reynolds	
2017	Tom Brady	2nd: Caitlyn Jenner; 3rd: Justin Bieber; 4th: Robert Kraft; 5th: Roger Goodell; 6th: Bill Belichick; 7th: The Voice; 8th: Beyoncé; 9th: Am I Annoying – Voters; 10th: Islamic State of Iraq and the Levant	
2018	Caitlyn Jenner	2nd: Harvey Weinstein; 3rd: Cindy Sheehan; 4th: Larry Nassar; 5th: Ayman al-Zawahiri; 6th: Jodie Whittaker; 7th: Federal Communications Commission; 8th: Jennifer Lopez; 9th: Macklemore; 10th: National Basketball Association	
2019	Roger Goodell	2nd: James Woods; 3rd: Tom Brady; 4th: Kylie Jenner; 5th: Mohamed Atta; 6th: Abu Faraj al-Libbi; 7th: Stacy Keibler; 8th: National Football League; 9th: Khalid Sheikh Mohammed; 10th: Am I Annoying – Voters	
2020	Harvey Weinstein	2nd: Al-Qaeda; 3rd: Kanye West; 4th: PewDiePie; 5th: Brooke Shields; 6th: NAMBLA; 7th: Florida; 8th: Joy Behar; 9th: Cops; 10th: Alexandre Dumas fils	
2021	Gisele Bündchen	2nd: Osama bin Laden; 3rd: Jennifer Lopez; 4th: Magic Johnson; 5th: Robert Irsay; 6th: James Woods; 7th: Emma Bunton; 8th: Bill Maher; 9th: Kobe Bryant; 10th: The Proud Boys	
2022	COVID-19	2nd: Joy Behar; 3rd: Katie Couric; 4th: Shawn Mendes; 5th: Taliban; 6th: Nazi Party; 7th: Soulja Boy; 8th: Dennis Miller; 9th: Adolf Hitler; 10th: Mitch McConnell	
2023	Nick Cannon	2nd: Jim Valvano; 3rd: Teri Weigel; 4th: Rudy Giuliani; 5th: Charlotte Flair; 6th: Palestinian Liberation Organization; 7th: Jackie Gayda; 8th: Lee Harvey Oswald; 9th: Fabiana Udenio; 10th: Soundgarden	
2024	Loni Anderson	2nd: Susan Sarandon; 3rd: Sidney Crosby; 4th: Deion Sanders; 5th: Andrew 'Dice' Clay; 6th: Diddy; 7th: Ronald Goldman; 8th: Jerry Seinfeld; 9th: Roger Clemens; 10th: Nicole Brown Simpson	
2025	Jeffrey Epstein	2nd: Harvey Weinstein; 3rd: Alec Baldwin; 4th: Piers Morgan; 5th: Jimmy Kimmel; 6th: Will Smith; 7th: Robin Quivers; 8th: Geraldo Rivera; 9th: Bill Cosby; 10th: Eli Manning	

=== Least Annoying of the Year ===
Least Annoying of the Year
Year	Least Annoying	Top Ten	Ref.
2001	Laika	2nd: Renee O'Connor; 3rd: Britney Spears; 4th: Sarah Michelle Gellar; 5th: Kate Bush; 6th: Sandra Bullock; 7th: Neil Diamond; 8th: Robert De Niro; 9th: Shannen Doherty; 10th: Mariah Carey	
2002	Mischa Barton	2nd: Holly Marie Combs; 3rd: Mary-Louise Parker; 4th: Amber Benson; 5th: Sue Bird; 6th: Natalie Portman; 7th: Sarah Michelle Gellar; 8th: Charlotte Church; 9th: Diane Lane; 10th: Donna Mills	
2003	Salma Hayek	2nd: Teresa Strasser; 3rd: God; 4th: John Ritter; 5th: Mischa Barton; 6th: Jennifer Garner; 7th: Eve; 8th: Mandy Moore; 9th: Kelly Rowland; 10th: Tina Turner	
2004	Renée Zellweger	2nd: Elisha Cuthbert; 3rd: Jamie-Lynn Sigler; 4th: Michelle Branch; 5th: Mia Hamm; 6th: Tommy Lee Jones; 7th: Dave Chappelle; 8th: The Beatles; 9th: Jon Stewart; 10th: Tom Hanks	
2005	Gene Hackman	2nd: Pope John Paul II; 3rd: Christopher Walken; 4th: Mandy Moore; 5th: Ewan McGregor; 6th: Johnny Carson; 7th: Green Day; 8th: Lisa Kudrow; 9th: Will Ferrell; 10th: Jennifer Connelly	
2006 (celebrities)	Beyoncé	2nd: Carmen Electra; 3rd: Nicole Kidman; 4th: Ralph Fiennes; 5th: Evangeline Lilly; 6th: Pamela Anderson; 7th: Michelle Trachtenberg; 8th: Suzy Kolber; 9th: Kiefer Sutherland; 10th: Bianca Lawson	
2006 (public figures)	Jesus Christ	2nd: God; 3rd: Bill Clinton; 4th: United States; 5th: Ted Kennedy; 6th: Don Imus; 7th: Hillary Clinton; 8th: Hippocrates; 9th: Jon Corzine; 10th: Sun	
2007 (celebrities)	Kylie Minogue	2nd: Angelina Jolie; 3rd: Madonna; 4th: Leonardo DiCaprio; 5th: Martha Stewart; 6th: Robert De Niro; 7th: Christina Aguilera; 8th: Sandra Bullock; 9th: Julia Roberts; 10th: Nicole Kidman	
2007 (public figures)	Barack Obama	2nd: Al Gore; 3rd: John Edwards; 4th: Jesus Christ; 5th: New York City; 6th: Bill Clinton; 7th: Jon Corzine; 8th: United States; 9th: Martin Luther King Jr.; 10th: God	
2008	Angelina Jolie	2nd: Jill Hennessy; 3rd: United States; 4th: Tina Fey; 5th: Pat Tillman; 6th: Parker Posey; 7th: Deborah Norville; 8th: Amber Benson; 9th: Hillary Clinton; 10th: Rosanna Arquette	
2009	Alyssa Milano	2nd: Beyoncé; 3rd: John McCain; 4th: United States; 5th: Jordin Sparks; 6th: Sidney Crosby; 7th: Bianca Lawson; 8th: Pat Tillman; 9th: Jon Stewart; 10th: Amber Benson	
2010	Meryl Streep	2nd: Peyton Manning; 3rd: Alyssa Milano; 4th: Joe Mauer; 5th: Tom Cruise; 6th: Tina Fey; 7th: Angelina Jolie; 8th: John McCain; 9th: United States; 10th: Hank Aaron	
2011	Kristy McNichol	2nd: Natalie Portman; 3rd: Michele Bachmann; 4th: Joe Mauer; 5th: Meryl Streep; 6th: Laura Bush; 7th: Charisma Carpenter; 8th: Portia de Rossi; 9th: Jill Hennessy; 10th: Johnny Depp	
2012	Hayley Atwell	2nd: Shayla LaVeaux; 3rd: Uranus; 4th: Alex Morgan; 5th: Jacqueline Moore; 6th: Jason Behr; 7th: Gary Carter; 8th: Diana Hyland; 9th: Nubs; 10th: John Edwards	
2013	Hayley Atwell	2nd: Colin Firth; 3rd: Tim Tebow; 4th: Paula Broadwell; 5th: Chris Kyle; 6th: George H. W. Bush; 7th: Ron Paul; 8th: Republican Party; 9th: Ronald Reagan; 10th: Jesus Christ	
2014	Colin Firth	2nd: Hayley Atwell; 3rd: Adam Levine; 4th: Shiri Appleby; 5th: Vivica A. Fox; 6th: Chris Kyle; 7th: Meryl Streep; 8th: Cesare Danova; 9th: Robert Irsay; 10th: Bill Maher	
2015	God	2nd: Pope Francis; 3rd: Chris Kyle; 4th: Meryl Streep; 5th: Hayley Atwell; 6th: Cesare Danova; 7th: United States; 8th: Bible; 9th: Benjamin Netanyahu; 10th: Leonard Nimoy	
2016	Paul Rudd	2nd: Chris Kyle; 3rd: United States; 4th: Buster; 5th: Ashleigh Banfield; 6th: Abigail Breslin; 7th: Pope Francis; 8th: Christie Brinkley; 9th: Colin Firth; 10th: Nikola Tesla	
2017	Pope Francis	2nd: Patrick Stewart; 3rd: Nikola Tesla; 4th: Jasper Schuringa; 5th: Cesare Danova; 6th: Gordon Lightfoot; 7th: Pat Tillman; 8th: Allen Leech; 9th: Colin Firth; 10th: Donald Trump	
2018	Martin Luther King Jr.	2nd: Malala Yousafzai; 3rd: Tony Dungy; 4th: Mikaela Shiffrin; 5th: Jesus Christ; 6th: Dinesh D'Souza; 7th: Nikola Tesla; 8th: Melania Trump; 9th: Rob Mariano; 10th: Tamlyn Tomita	
2019	Hayley Atwell	2nd: Elon Musk; 3rd: Chuck Schumer; 4th: Honor Blackman; 5th: Jim Irsay; 6th: Mariska Hargitay; 7th: Constance Wu; 8th: Rachel Maddow; 9th: Sasha Alexander; 10th: Kathy Griffin	
2020	Cleo King	2nd: Milo of Croton; 3rd: Drea de Matteo; 4th: Danny White; 5th: Traylor Howard; 6th: Michelle Johnson; 7th: Louis Riel; 8th: Rachel Reilly; 9th: Leslie Mann; 10th: Neve Campbell	
2021	Harry Styles	2nd: Alexandria Ocasio-Cortez; 3rd: Miley Cyrus; 4th: Amanda Gorman; 5th: Ed O'Neill; 6th: Christopher Meloni; 7th: Elon Musk; 8th: Meryl Streep; 9th: Jesus Christ; 10th: Kevin Stefanski	
2022	Christopher Meloni	2nd: Volodymyr Zelenskyy; 3rd: Pete Alonso; 4th: Joe Biden; 5th: Amy Adams; 6th: Gary Carter; 7th: Melanie Brown; 8th: Amy Poehler; 9th: Jesus Christ; 10th: Julia Roberts	
2023	God	2nd: Gary Carter; 3rd: Ray Rice; 4th: Bianca Belair; 5th: Cathy Cat; 6th: Betty White; 7th: Reese Witherspoon; 8th: Greg Abbott; 9th: Pfizer; 10th: Cheryl Ladd	
2024	Jenna Ortega	2nd: Idris Elba; 3rd: Jethro Tull; 4th: Blake Snell; 5th: Zoe Tay; 6th: Julia Nickson; 7th: Reese Witherspoon; 8th: Kamala Harris; 9th: Pennsylvania; 10th: Barbara Eden	
2025	Beyoncé	2nd: Idris Elba; 3rd: Amon-Ra St. Brown; 4th: Britney Spears; 5th: Jenni Falconer; 6th: Mariah Carey; 7th: Kendall Jenner; 8th: Scarlett Johansson; 9th: Derrick Van Orden; 10th: Roberto Clemente	
