= Brandi Brandt =

American model and actress

Playboy centerfold appearance
- October 1987
- Preceded by: Gwen Hajek
- Succeeded by: Pamela Stein

Personal details
- Born: Brandi Angela Brandt; November 2, 1968 (age 58) Santa Clara, California, U.S.
- Height: 5 ft 5 in (165 cm)

Brandi Angela Brandt (born November 2, 1968) is an American model and actress, who was Playboy's Playmate of the Month for October 1987.

== Early life ==
Brandt was born on November 2, 1968, in Santa Clara, California, to Mike Brandt and drummer, percussionist, and vocalist, Brie Howard-Darling (née Berry). Her parents divorced in 1972 and she split her time with her mother in Los Angeles and her father in Sacramento, California. When Brandt was 12 years old, she met comedic actor Jon Lovitz, who at the time was in a Groundlings class with American Girls bandmate Hillary Matthews. Brandt and Lovitz became friends.

== Career ==
=== Playboy ===
At age 18, Brandt appeared as the Playmate of the Month and cover girl for the October 1987 Back to Campus issue of Playboy magazine. She also appeared in Playboy's Blondes, Brunettes, Redheads magazine and on the cover with Debi Nicolle Johnson and Sandra Wild.

She was the cover model for Playboy's August 1989 Women of Wall Street issue and appeared on the cover of the March 1990 issue with Donald Trump. An autographed copy of Playboy with Brandt and Trump on the cover sold at auction for $4,900.

=== Acting and television appearances ===
Brandt appeared as herself in "Desperately Seeking Miss October", the November 5, 1989 episode of the television sitcom Married... with Children.

In 1989, Brandt appeared as the elevator operator in the beginning of the video for the Aerosmith song "Love in an Elevator".

In 2000, she played Glamorous Gyno-American in the Troma Entertainment film Citizen Toxie: The Toxic Avenger IV.

== Filmography ==
- 1987 Can't Buy Me Love as Girl Named Penny in Ferrari
- 1987 The Joe Piscopo Halloween Party as Dancer
- 1988 The Beach Boys' music video for "Kokomo" as Beach Girl
- 1989 Married... with Children as herself (one episode entitled "Desperately Seeking Miss October")
- 1989 Aerosmith's music video for "Love in an Elevator" as Elevator Operator
- 1990 Wedding Band as Serena
- 1991 Mötley Crüe's music video for "Anarchy in the U.S.A." as Stage Guest (with son, Gunner)
- 2000 Citizen Toxie: The Toxic Avenger IV as Glamorous Gyno-American
- 2001 Ticker as Cocktail Waitress

== Personal life ==
From May 1990 to November 1996, Brandt was married to Nikki Sixx, the bassist of heavy metal band Mötley Crüe, with whom she had three children.

Brandt was involved with a drug-trafficking syndicate importing cocaine into Australia between July and December 2007. On November 15, 2013, Brandt was extradited from Los Angeles, California, to Sydney, Australia, to face criminal charges at the city's Central Local Court. In April 2014, Brandt pleaded guilty to a charge of conspiring to import drugs. On August 29, 2014, Brandt was sentenced to up to six years but was eligible for parole in November 2016. She was released in 2017 and is active on social media selling merch.

== See also ==
- List of people in Playboy 1980–1989

Luann Lee	Julie Peterson	Marina Baker	Anna Clark	Kymberly Paige	Sandy Greenberg
Carmen Berg	Sharry Konopski	Gwen Hajek	Brandi Brandt	Pamela Stein	India Allen
