= Rebekka Armstrong =

American model and bodybuilder

Playboy centerfold appearance
- September 1986
- Preceded by: Ava Fabian
- Succeeded by: Katherine Hushaw

Personal details
- Born: Rebekka Lynn Armstrong; February 20, 1967 (age 59) Ridgecrest, California, U.S.

Rebekka Lynn Armstrong is an American HIV/AIDS activist and former model and bodybuilder. She was Playboy Playmate of the Month for September 1986. Eight years later, she was the first Playmate to publicly announce that she is HIV-positive.

== Biography ==
Armstrong announced that she is HIV-positive in the September 1994 issue of The Advocate. She said that she had known she was infected since 1989, but spent two years after her diagnosis escaping into substance abuse. By the time of the publication of The Advocate article, she had come out as a lesbian and decided to educate others about HIV/AIDS, especially among lesbian and bisexual women. She said she was unsure of when she had contracted the virus, but might have as early as age 16. Armstrong believes she may have contracted the HIV either through a blood transfusion after she was rushed into surgery following complications from an abortion, or it may have been from a heterosexual encounter with a man who later informed her he was HIV-positive due to his bisexual encounters. By the time she was interviewed in 1999 for AIDS Project Los Angeles she identified as bisexual and said she had been infected at 16 "to the best of my knowledge." A University of Toledo events notice in 2004 said that Playboy founder Hugh Hefner and the Playboy Foundation assisted Armstrong financially on her AIDS-awareness campaign, the College Campus Safer Sex education program.

In a 2013 speech to community college students in Spokane, Washington, Armstrong shared details about the early days of her illness, the aggressive AZT treatment that she endured, the good and bad times of that five-year period, and about her suicide attempt followed by a coma and a lengthy hospital stay.

In addition to her former career as a model and her current activism, Armstrong has also competed as a bodybuilder.

== Bodybuilding contest history ==
- 2004 Muscle Beach (Venice Beach, CA) – 1st (LW & overall)
- 2004 NPC Los Angeles Championship – 1st (MW)
- 2005 NPC Pittsburgh – 1st (MW & overall)
- 2005 NPC Nationals – 12th (HW)
- 2009 NPC Los Angeles Championships - 1st (HW and overall)
- 2009 NPC USA Championships - 7th (LHW)

Sherry Arnett	Julie McCullough	Kim Morris	Teri Weigel	Christine Richters	Rebecca Ferratti
Lynne Austin	Ava Fabian	Rebekka Armstrong	Katherine Hushaw	Donna Edmondson	Laurie Carr
