= List of Playboy Playmates of 1987 =

The following is a list of Playboy Playmates of 1987. Playboy magazine names its Playmate of the Month each month throughout the year.

== January ==
Luann Lee
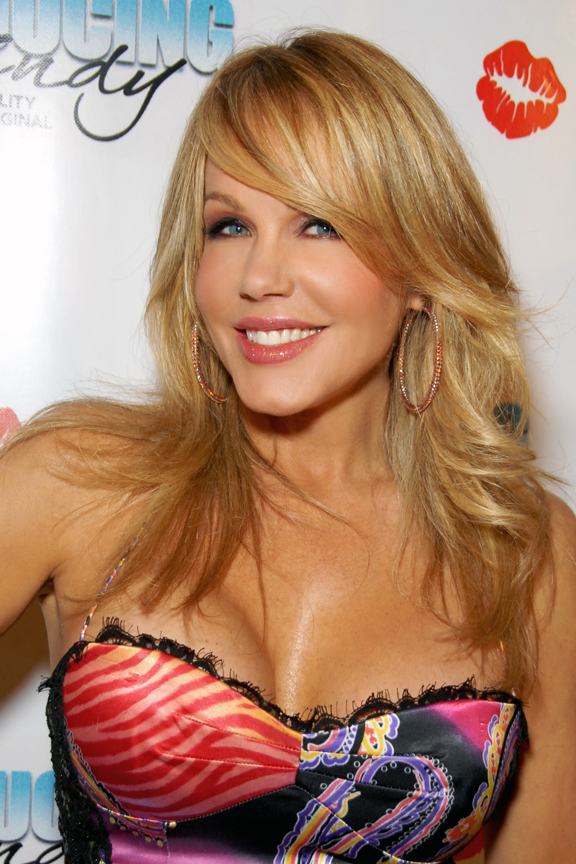
- Luann Lee attending the "Seducing Cindy" Finale Party, Studio City, California on March 18, 2010

Personal details
- Born: January 28, 1961 (age 65) Santa Monica, California, U.S.
- Height: 5 ft 5 in (1.65 m)

Luann Laureen Lee (born January 28, 1961) is an American model, singer and actress. Luann was selected as Playboy magazine's Playmate of the Month in January 1987. Luann has appeared in several Playboy videos and special editions, working steadily for Playboy for more than five years following her centerfold appearance. Lee also appeared in an episode of Married... with Children.

== February ==
Julie Peterson

Personal details
- Born: September 29, 1964 (age 61) Havre de Grace, Maryland, U.S.
- Height: 5 ft 8 in (1.73 m)

Julie Peterson (born September 29, 1964) is an American model. She was chosen as Playboy's Playmate of the Month in February 1987. She is also a member of Mensa and a 1986 graduate of Life Chiropractic College. From 2001 to 2005 she hosted a CNN syndicated show called Health Watch. She is a chiropractor in Charleston SC, where she hosted "The Wellness Revolution" on local radio.

== March ==
Marina Baker

Personal details
- Born: December 8, 1967 (age 58) Windsor, Berkshire, England
- Height: 5 ft 7 in (1.70 m)

Marina Augusta Pepper (born December 8, 1967, in Windsor, Berkshire, England; née Baker) is an English Liberal Democrat local politician, journalist, children's book author and former model and actress. She was chosen as Playboy's Playmate of the Month for March 1987.

== April ==
Anna Clark

Personal details
- Born: October 19, 1966 (age 59) San Francisco, California, U.S.
- Height: 5 ft 1 in (1.55 m)

Anna Clark (born October 19, 1966, in San Francisco, California) is an American model and actress. She was chosen as Playboy's Playmate of the month for April 1987.

== May ==
Kymberly Paige

Personal details
- Born: April 6, 1966 (age 60) Newport Beach, California, U.S.
- Height: 5 ft 8 in (1.73 m)

Kymberly Paige (born April 6, 1966, in Newport Beach, California) is an American model and actress. She was chosen as Playboy's Playmate of the month for May 1987.

== June ==
Sandy Greenberg

Personal details
- Born: July 22, 1958 (age 68) Spokane, Washington, U.S.
- Height: 5 ft 7 in (1.70 m)

Sandy Elizabeth Greenberg (also known as Sondra Greenberg) (born July 22, 1958, in Spokane, Washington) is an American model and actress. She was chosen as Playboy's Playmate of the Month for June 1987. She lived in St. Louis, Missouri when she became Playmate of the Month. She was also featured in a "Maxine Legroom" pictorial in January of that year, a parody of TV's Max Headroom.

== July ==
Carmen Berg

Personal details
- Born: August 17, 1963 (age 62) Bismarck, North Dakota, U.S.
- Height: 5 ft 7 in (1.70 m)

Carmen Berg (born August 17, 1963) is an American model and actress. She was chosen as Playboy's Playmate of the Month for July 1987. She is currently a real estate agent in Southern California.

== August ==
Sharry Konopski

Personal details
- Born: December 2, 1967 Longview, Washington, U.S.
- Died: August 25, 2017 (aged 49)
- Height: 5 ft 2 in (1.57 m)

Sharry Konopski (born December 2, 1967, in Longview, Washington – August 25, 2017 Silverlake, Washington) was an American model and actress. She was chosen as Playboy's Playmate of the Month for August 1987 and appeared in numerous Playboy videos.

Sharry married twice: first to Mark DeBolt, with whom she had two children, then again to Joseph Randall. She was paralyzed from the waist down in an auto accident on April 1, 1995. Sharry died on August 25, 2017, from complications from pneumonia due to lung cancer at age 49.

== September ==
Gwen Hajek

Personal details
- Born: November 18, 1966 (age 59) Shreveport, Louisiana, U.S.
- Height: 5 ft 7 in (1.70 m)

Gwen Hajek (born November 18, 1966, in Shreveport, Louisiana) is an American model and actress. She was chosen as Playboy's Playmate of the Month for September 1987.

== October ==
Brandi Brandt

Personal details
- Born: November 2, 1968 (age 57) Santa Clara, California, U.S.
- Height: 5 ft 5 in (1.65 m)

Brandi Brandt (born November 2, 1968, in Santa Clara, California) is an American model and actress, who was Playboy's Playmate of the Month for October 1987. She was the cover model for the August 1989 issue of Playboy and shared the cover of the March 1990 issue with Donald Trump.

Brandt was married to Mötley Crüe bassist Nikki Sixx, with whom she had three children.

== November ==
Pam Stein

Personal details
- Born: August 13, 1963 (age 63) Syracuse, New York, U.S.
- Height: 5 ft 5 in (1.65 m)

Pamela Jean Stein (or Pam Stein) (born August 13, 1963, in Syracuse, New York) is an American model and actress. She was chosen as Playboy magazine's Playmate of the Month for its November 1987 issue. Her Playboy centerfold is featured in the movie Die Hard, and used as a point of reference by John McLean as he navigates from the elevator shaft to the ventilation shaft. She is married to Robin Zander, the frontman of American power pop band, Cheap Trick.

== December ==
India Allen

Playboy Playmate of the Year
- 1988
- Preceded by: Donna Edmondson
- Succeeded by: Kimberley Conrad

Personal details
- Born: June 1, 1965 (age 61) Portsmouth, Virginia, U.S.
- Height: 5 ft 11 in (1.80 m)

India Allen (born June 1, 1965; Portsmouth, Virginia) is an American actress and model. Allen appeared as a centerfold in the December 1987 issue of Playboy magazine and was subsequently named Playmate of the Year in 1988. In 1996, Allen was a witness in the civil trial of O. J. Simpson.

== See also ==
- List of people in Playboy 1980–1989

Luann Lee	Julie Peterson	Marina Baker	Anna Clark	Kymberly Paige	Sandy Greenberg
Carmen Berg	Sharry Konopski	Gwen Hajek	Brandi Brandt	Pamela Stein	India Allen
