= Julie McCullough =

American actor and comedian (born 1965)

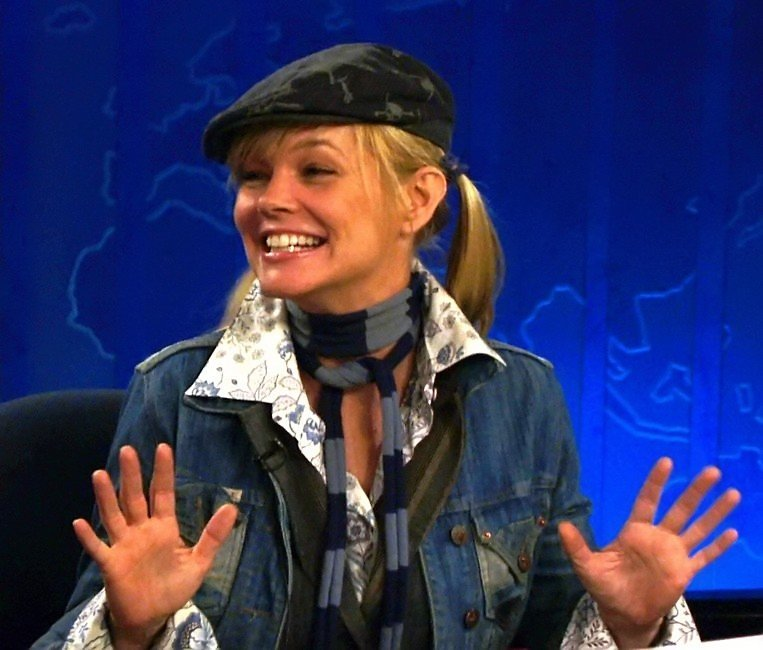
- Years active: 1983–present
- Known for: Growing Pains

Playboy centerfold appearance
- February 1986
- Preceded by: Sherry Arnett
- Succeeded by: Kim Morris

Personal details
- Born: January 30, 1965 (age 61) Honolulu, Hawaii, United States
- Height: 5 ft 7 in (1.70 m)

Julie Michelle McCullough (born January 30, 1965) is an American model, actress and stand-up comedian. She was the model on the cover of the February 1985 issue of Playboy and then became the Playmate of the Month for February 1986, and played the role of Julie Costello on Growing Pains in 1989–90.

== Early life ==
Julie McCullough, who is of Irish descent, was born in Honolulu, Hawaii and named after a 1950s song called "Oh Julie". She has one older brother, Joey. McCullough's parents divorced when she was four. Her mother, Nancy, a housewife, married Herman Paynter, a Marine, one year later. In addition to living in Honolulu, she grew up in several states, including North Carolina, West Virginia, Florida, Louisiana, Missouri, Texas, Nevada and California, as well as Canada and Italy. She considers herself Southern, having attended high school in Poplar Bluff, Missouri and Allen, Texas.

== Career ==
=== Modeling ===
McCullough worked as a model in her teens before moving to California. In 1983, McCullough graduated from high school and was living in Allen, Texas, when a photographer approached her to pose for Playboy magazine. She became a Playboy model appearing in four issues: February 1985 (on the cover and as part of a "Girls of Texas" pictorial), February 1986 (as Playmate of the Month), September 1986 (on the cover and as part of a "Farmer's Daughters" pictorial) and October 1989 (a post-Growing Pains compilation of her first three shoots with extra pictures). She also appeared on the cover of "Inside Sports" magazine's swimsuit issue and made posters for Harley-Davidson.

In 1989, officials of North Carolina Azalea Festival stripped Julie McCullough of her crown as Azalea Queen of Wilmington, because of controversy surrounding her appearance as a Playboy centerfold.

In 2004, McCullough voiced herself as a tutorial guide in the video game Playboy: The Mansion.

=== Acting career ===
McCullough found work in a number of television and film projects. Her work included Max Headroom, The Golden Girls, a role in the 1987 film Big Bad Mama II co-starring Angie Dickinson, Superboy and the 1988 horror movie remake The Blob. She starred in the syndicated adventure series Robin's Hoods as Stacey Wright with singer-actor Rick Springfield. Robin's Hoods lasted one season on television.

==== Growing Pains ====
Julie McCullough landed the role of nanny Julie Costello on the television show Growing Pains in 1989. She appeared in eight episodes until she was fired in 1990, which allegedly stemmed from series star Kirk Cameron's conversion to evangelical Christianity, a conversion that, according to The E! True Hollywood Story episode focusing on the show, served to alienate him from his fellow cast members, as he did not invite any of them to his wedding. In his 2008 autobiography Still Growing, Cameron states that he did not call for her to be fired and the show's producers have claimed that Julie's character was never intended to be a permanent character. However, the long-told story is that Cameron called for McCullough's termination because of his anger and objections to her having posed nude in Playboy, accusing the show's producers of promoting pornography. A decade later, Cameron apologized to his TV family for some of his prior behavior due to his lack of maturity. He reportedly did not reconcile with McCullough, who claims that Cameron refused to speak to her during a later encounter. She remains critical of him, stating that she lost a lot from the public criticism she endured during the controversy. McCullough has criticized the evangelical television programming Cameron has produced, which she has viewed on one occasion, saying on her MySpace page:

He thinks if I read science books that I'm going to hell. [I would] rather laugh with the sinners than cry with the saints ... the sinners are much more fun. And a lot more interesting than some book-burner who is still having growing pains. I am at peace with God. Kirk thinks people like me are going to Hell, if I do then at least I'll go well informed and well read.

After the Growing Pains scandal, McCullough made several television appearances on Beverly Hills, 90210, Jake and the Fatman, Harry and the Hendersons, The Golden Girls, The Drew Carey Show and Drexell's Class.

=== Comedy ===
McCullough now works as a stand-up comedian, and has performed at the Hollywood Improv, the Palms Hotel and Casino and the Laugh Factory.

McCullough has appeared on the E! reality show The Girls Next Door. She appeared in "Under the Covers", the ninth episode of the first season, which aired in October 2005, "We Can Work It Out", the thirteenth episode of the second season, which aired in November 2006 and "May the Horse Be With You", the second episode of the third season, which aired in March 2007.

== Personal life ==
According to Dave Itzkoff, writing in an article in the June 2006 Playboy magazine, during the rise in popularity of MySpace, McCullough was "Playboy's unofficial ambassador to the MySpace nation."

In 2015, McCullough celebrated her 50th birthday at the Comedy Store club in Hollywood with a sold-out stand-up comedy show. Guests included Tia Carrere and Pauly Shore.

== Music video ==
Nitro, "Long Way From Home" 1989

== Filmography ==
=== Film ===
Year	Title	Role	Notes
1987	Big Bad Mama II	Polly McClatchie	
1988	The Blob	Susie	
1992	Round Trip to Heaven	Lucille Johnson	
1993	The Baby Doll Murders	Betty Maglia	
1994	The St. Tammany Miracle	Kimberly	
1994	In the Living Years	Annie	
1996	Echo of Blue	Kathleen Randolph	
1997	Top of the World	Ginger	
1999	Me and Will	Stacey	
2000	Intrepid	Cruise Director Shannon	
2004	West from North Goes South	Dream Girl	
2008	Jack Rio	Red Carpet Hostess	
2009	A Letter to Dad	Annie	
2011	2012: Ice Age	Teri Hart	Direct to video
2016	Renaissance Man	Jules	
2016	Hospital Arrest	Dr. Lynn Joyner	
2018	Untogether	Bus stop crackhead	

=== Television ===
Year	Title	Role	Notes
1987	Who's the Boss?	Beautiful Girl	Episode: "The Way We Was"
1987	1st & Ten: The Championship	Tracy - Stuart's girlfriend	Episode: "The Brink of Death"
1988	Max Headroom		Episode: "Neurostim"
1988	Superboy	Sara Danner	Episode: "A kind of Princess"
1989–1990	Growing Pains	Julie Costello	11 episodes
1990	The Golden Girls	Mary	Episode: "Mary Has a Little Lamb"
1990	Without Her Consent	Claire Sugarman	TV movie
1991	Beverly Hills, 90210	Trina	Episode: "Slumber Party"
1991	The Munsters Today	Stephanie	Episode: "Lotsa Luck"
1991	Jake and the Fatman	Darcy Warren	Episode: "It's a Sin to Tell a Lie"
1991	Revenge of the Nerds	Cheerleader	Unaired TV Pilot
1991–1992	Drexell's Class	Rosie / School Secretary	3 episodes
1992	Harry and the Hendersons	Uma	Episode: "The Love Mask"
1993	Arly Hanks	Jay-Lee	TV movie
1993–1994	Robin's Hoods	Stacey Wright	Main role
1995	The Drew Carey Show	Peaches	2 episodes
1996–1997	High Tide	Meg Kelsey	2 episodes
1997	Breast Men	1970's Head Receptionist	TV movie
1999	Pacific Blue	Carol Best	2 episodes
2000	Relic Hunter	Erica, The Erotic	Episode: "A Vanishing Art"
2001	Black Scorpion	Dr. Ariel Haze / Pollutia	Episode: "Life's a Gas"
2012	Gila!	Vera	TV movie
2013	Sharknado	Joni Waves	TV movie

Sherry Arnett	Julie McCullough	Kim Morris	Teri Weigel	Christine Richters	Rebecca Ferratti
Lynne Austin	Ava Fabian	Rebekka Armstrong	Katherine Hushaw	Donna Edmondson	Laurie Carr
