= Big Bad Mama II =

- Directed by: Jim Wynorski
- Written by: Jim Wynorski; R. J. Robertson
- Based on: Characters created by William Norton; Frances Doel
- Produced by: Roger Corman
- Starring: Angie Dickinson; Robert Culp; Danielle Brisebois; Julie McCullough
- Cinematography: Robert New
- Music by: Chuck Cirino
- Production company: New Horizons
- Distributed by: Concorde Pictures
- Release date: October 1987
- Running time: 82 mins
- Country: USA
- Language: English

Big Bad Mama II is a 1987 American action–crime–sexploitation comedy film produced by Roger Corman, directed by Jim Wynorski, starring Angie Dickinson, Robert Culp, Danielle Brisebois and Julie McCullough. While it has been identified as a sequel to Big Bad Mama (1974), it is more accurately described as a reboot, as the film exists on a parallel plane with its predecessor.

== Plot ==
In 1934, Wilma McClatchie's husband is shot down by police attempting to evict the McClatchies from their farm. Wilma's entry into a bank-robbing career occurs from a need for righteous revenge against Morgan Crawford, the banker who foreclosed on her home and is now running for governor of Texas. She tells her two daughters, Polly and Billie Jean: "The best way to kill a man is to destroy his dreams." So, among other things, she abducts Crawford's son, Jordan, and turns him into a willing gang member with her daughters' help. Also aiding and abetting the McClatchies in the plan is an Eastern journalist, who sees the thieving clan as his front-page ticket.

== Cast ==
- Angie Dickinson as Wilma McClatchie
- Robert Culp as Daryl Pearson
- Danielle Brisebois as Billie Jean McClatchie
- Julie McCullough as Polly McClatchie
- Bruce Glover as Morgan Crawford
- Jeff Yagher as Jordan Crawford
- Jacque Lynn Colton as Alma
- Ebbe Roe Smith as Lucas Stroud
- Charles Cyphers as Stark
- Kelli Maroney as Willie McClatchie
- Linda Shayne as Bank Teller

== Production ==
Filming started in June 1987 and took four weeks.

== Reception ==
In the Los Angeles Times, film critic Leonard Klady called it "one of the strangest sequels ever to crash through a roadblock...the first genuine moral fairy tale of the genre."
