= Renee Tenison =

American actress (born 1968)

- Born: December 2, 1968 (age 57); Caldwell, Idaho
- Relatives: Rosie Tenison (twin sister)

Playboy centerfold appearance
- November 1989
- Preceded by: Karen Foster
- Succeeded by: Petra Verkaik

Playboy Playmate of the Year
- 1990
- Preceded by: Kimberley Conrad
- Succeeded by: Lisa Matthews

Personal details
- Height: 5 ft 6 in (168 cm)

Reneé Tenison (born December 2, 1968) is an American model, actress and Playboy Playmate, and the first African-American selected to be Playmate of the Year, she was first Miss November 1989 and was later named 1990's Playmate of the Year

== Life and career ==
Tenison was born in Caldwell, Idaho. She has three older brothers and an identical twin sister, Rosie, who also works as a model. Rosie and Renee posed in the August 2002 issue of Playboy together.

Tenison appeared as the Playmate of the Month in the November 1989 issue of Playboy magazine and was subsequently named Playmate of the Year for 1990, the first PMOY of African American descent. In 2001, she was selected as one of the ten sexiest women of the year by the readers of Black Men magazine. In May 2017, at the age of 48, Tenison duplicated her Playmate of the Year cover along with her cohorts Kimberley Conrad, Candace Collins, Lisa Matthews, Cathy St. George, Charlotte Kemp, and Monique St. Pierre nearly three decades on.

== Filmography ==
=== Films ===
Year	Title	Role	Notes
1991	Shout	Girl in Bar	
1993	CB4	Twin	
2000	Nutty Professor II: The Klumps	Dog Owner	uncredited

=== Television ===
Year	Title	Role	Notes
1991	Married... with Children	Macadamia	"Route 666: Part 2"
1991	Married... with Children	Topsy	"Lookin' for a Desk in All the Wrong Places"
1996	Married... with Children	Marla	"Spring Break: Part 2"
1996	Married... with Children	Marla	"Torch Song Duet"
1991	The Fresh Prince of Bel-Air	Katie	"Guess Who's Coming to Marry?"
1996	The Fresh Prince of Bel-Air	Katie	"Breaking Up Is Hard to Do: Part 2"
1995	Living Single	Christina	"Space Invaders"
1995	The Crew		"Bar Mitzvah Boy"
1995	Family Matters	Tawny	"Teacher's Pet"
1995	Martin	Ebony	"Housekeeper from Hell"
1996	The Jamie Foxx Show	Gwen	"Who's Da Man?"
1997	Renegade	Roxanne	"Sex, Lies and Activewear"
1997	Malcolm & Eddie	Renee	"Lockdown"
1998	Veronica's Closet	Dakota	"Veronica's All Nighter"
1998	Mike Hammer, Private Eye	—N/a	"A New Leaf: Part 1" (as Renée Tenison)
1998	V.I.P.	Donna Fabre	"Vallery of the Dolls"
1998	Mortal Kombat: Conquest	Sora	"Quan Chi"
1999	Mortal Kombat: Conquest	Sora	"Flawed Victory"
1999	L.A. Heat	Kendra Brooks	
1999	The Steve Harvey Show	Cherry	"Party of Five" (as Reneé Tenison)
2000	Judging Amy	Mia	"Shaken, Not Stirred"
2001	The Parkers	Nurse Betty	"In Sickness and in Health"
2003	The Parkers	Candy	"She's a Bad Mamma Jamma"

== See also ==
- List of people in Playboy 1980–1989
- List of people in Playboy 1990–1999

Fawna MacLaren	Simone Eden	Laurie Wood	Jennifer Lyn Jackson	Monique Noel	Tawnni Cable
Erika Eleniak	Gianna Amore	Karin and Mirjam van Breeschooten	Karen Foster	Renee Tenison	Petra Verkaik
