= Wild Cactus =

- Promotional film poster
- Directed by: Jag Mundhra
- Written by: Jag Mundhra
- Story by: Carl Austin
- Produced by: Alan B. Bursteen
- Starring: David Naughton; India Allen; Gary Hudson; Kathy Shower; Bubba Baker; Robert Z'Dar; Paul Gleason
- Cinematography: James Mathers
- Edited by: Ron Resnick
- Music by: Larry Wolff
- Production companies: Imperial Entertainment; Lincolnwood Motion Pictures; Metropolis Motion Pictures
- Distributed by: Imperial Entertainment
- Release date: March 24, 1993 (United States)
- Running time: 92 minutes
- Country: United States
- Language: English

Wild Cactus is a 1993 erotic thriller film directed by Jag Mundhra and starring David Naughton, India Allen, Gary Hudson, Kathy Shower, Bubba Baker, Robert Z'Dar, and Paul Gleason. It was released direct to video on 24 March 1993.

== Plot ==
Philip and Alexandria are a married couple that have decided to spend their vacation at a friend's house in the Arizona desert. Their marriage has hit a rough patch due to Philip's work, which has monopolized his time and left Alexandra feeling lonely. Additionally, Alex is encouraged to cheat on her husband by a close friend, which she considers. She's further dismayed when she finds that Philip is still too busy to pay attention to her and pushes him to go to a night bar.

Once there the two quickly run into some trouble with a biker, but are saved from harm by Randall and Maggie. They give the two a ride to a trailer park, unaware that Randall is there to get revenge against his ex-girlfriend Celeste, who sent him to jail, and that Maggie is a prostitute that Randall has brought along. Randall manages to break into the trailer, which terrifies Celeste. Despite his assurances that he is not there to harm her, Randall forces Celeste to have sex with Maggie, who eventually shoots and kills her at Randall's request.

The following morning the two arrive at Alexandria and Philip's vacation home, as Randall had promised to help Philip look for plants for his job. The two men leave to look for plants, only for Randall to push Philip off a cliff. Believing the man to be dead, Randall drives off, unaware that Philip survived and has begun walking back in order to rescue his wife. Meanwhile, back at the house, Alexandria has grown increasingly suspicious that Maggie is a wanted criminal, and at one point tries to call the police, but is interrupted by Maggie. When Randall returns without Philip, Alexandria, driven by a desire to survive and a desire to have an extramarital affair with a dangerous, sexy man, tries to turn the couple against one another by having sex with them both. After having sex with Randall, and realizing she really enjoyed it, Alexandra attempts to run away with him, but to no avail.

On his way back to the house, Philip finds his way to Celeste's trailer park and discovers her naked dead body lying on her bed. Soon after, he is found by the town's Sheriff Brenner, who takes Philip back to the vacation house after hearing his story. They arrive at the house and sneak into it in an attempt to save Alexandria. Maggie, who has decided that she is no longer going to follow Randall, is accidentally shot by the sheriff, who is then killed by Randall. Randall then tries to chase after Alexandria, only for her to later turn the tables on him and shoot him. Finally safe, Philip and Alexandria embrace.

== Cast ==
- David Naughton as Philip Marcus
- India Allen as Alexandria 'Alex' Marcus
- Gary Hudson as Randall Murphy
- Kathy Shower as Celeste
- Bubba Baker as Drunk
- Robert Z'Dar as Officer Grady
- Paul Gleason as Sheriff Brenner
- Michelle Moffett as Maggie
- Anna Karin as Inga
- Wendy MacDonald as Abby
- Warren Sweeney as Gas Mart Clerk
- David Wells as Salesman
- Ric Stoneback as Bartender
- Faith Jones as Prison Clerk
- Jay Polan as Dean
- Carrie Chambers as Waitress

== Reception ==
TV Guide panned the film for its lack of plot and wrote "Director Jag Mundhra made one of the better direct-to-video sex thrillers, NIGHT EYES, in 1990, but never learned the lesson that a good script is the best aphrodisiac." Allmovie also rated the film poorly and gave it one star.
