= Cooper Hefner =

American businessman (born 1991)

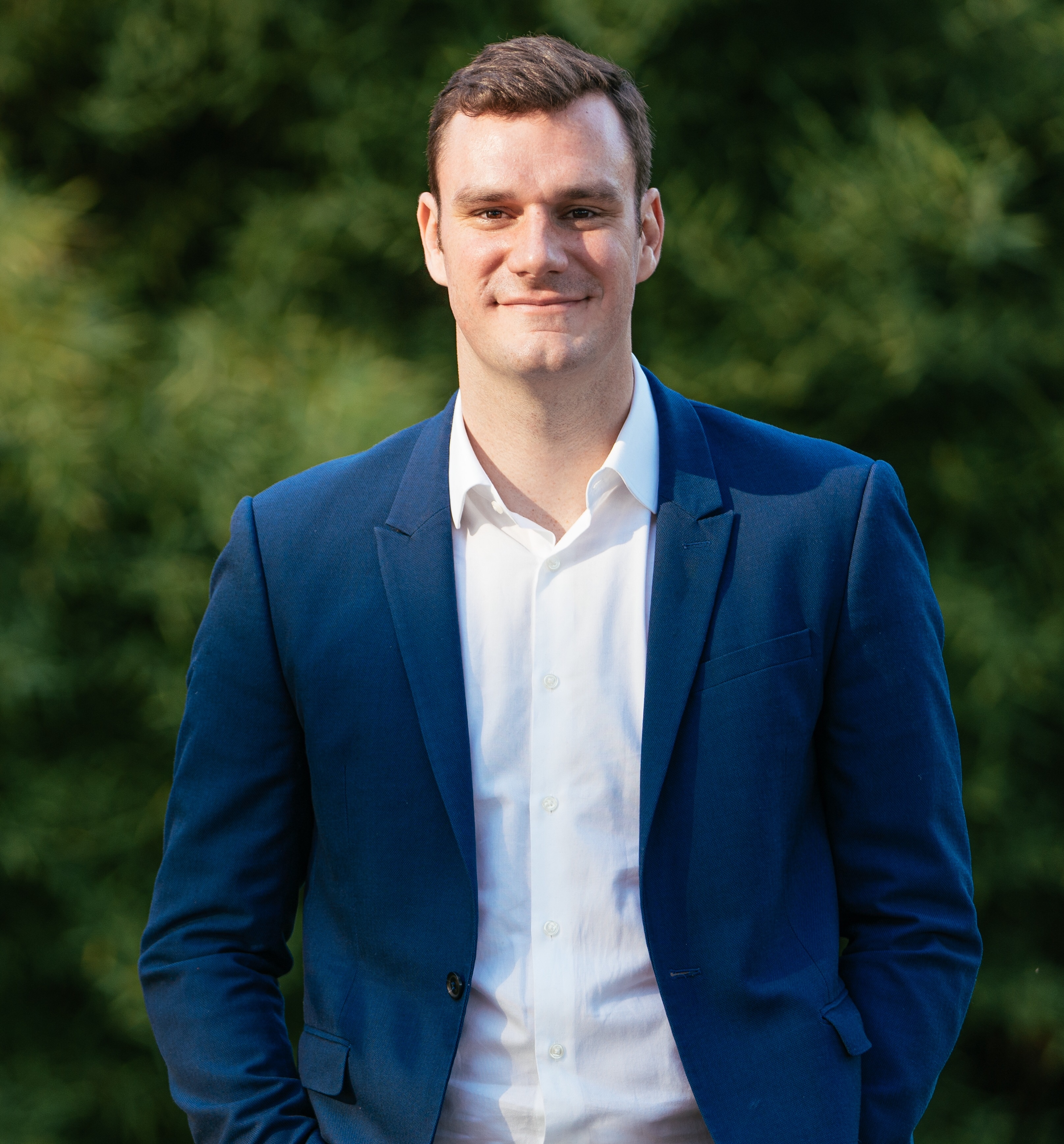
- Born: Cooper Bradford Hefner; September 4, 1991 (age 35); Los Angeles, California, U.S.
- Education: Chapman University
- Occupation: Businessman
- Political party: Democratic
- Spouse: Scarlett Byrne (m. 2019)
- Children: 3
- Parents: Hugh Hefner (father); Kimberley Conrad (mother)
- Relatives: Christie Hefner (half-sister)
- Military career
- Allegiance: California; United States
- Branch: California State Military Reserve; United States Air Force
- Service years: 2019–present
- Awards: United States Air & Space Commendation Medal

Cooper Bradford Hefner (born September 4, 1991) is an American businessman. He is the managing partner of Hefner Capital. He has worked as the chief creative officer and chief of global partnerships at Playboy Enterprises, a company founded by his father, Hugh Hefner. He was also the founder and initial chief executive officer of the startup company Hop.

== Early life ==
Hefner was born on September 4, 1991, in Los Angeles, California, to Hugh Hefner (1926–2017) and Kimberley Conrad. He grew up in a mansion adjacent to the Playboy Mansion, which was purchased by his father after his parents separated. Hefner graduated from Ojai Valley School in 2009 and received a bachelor's degree from Chapman University in 2015.

== Career ==
Hefner started working for Playboy Enterprises, Inc. when he was in college. In early 2016, Hefner, who was a board observer at the time, left the company due to disagreements with then CEO Scott Flanders about the direction the company was taking. He then began editing, writing and publishing op-eds, which centered on politics, culture and philosophy.

In 2016, Hefner launched the media startup company Hop (Hefner Operations & Productions), focused on content and social events for millennials. He returned to Playboy and was named chief creative officer of the company in July 2016 when Hugh Hefner stepped down from that post. In February 2017, Hefner announced nude images would return to the magazine, stating that the problem had been the presentation of nude images rather than the nudity itself. He also oversaw the decision to feature Playboy's first transgender playmate in the centerfold for its November issue.

Playboy's earnings for 2017 increased by more than 39 percent year-over-year following Hefner's return to the company. In January 2018, The Wall Street Journal reported the controlling shareholder of Playboy Enterprises was considering ending the U.S. print edition of Playboy Magazine, stating the magazine has lost as much as $7 million annually in recent years. Hefner has been recognized on The Folio: 100 list for 2017 for his contributions to the magazine media industry as well as appearing on the Forbes 30 Under 30 list for 2018.

In January 2019, Hefner took over as the chief of global partnerships for Playboy Enterprises. In that position, he would focus on revenue and business development over content and media management. In April 2019, Playboy Enterprises CEO Ben Kohn confirmed Hefner would exit his senior role at Playboy to launch a media brand, the Hefner Media Corporation, and a digital content platform called HefPost. Later, through an Instagram account after having left Playboy, in July 2019 Hefner stated his new digital content platform would be called instead StagDaily.

In December 2019, Hefner halted plans to start a media company and digital content platform, and enlisted in the United States Air Force. He had previously been a member of the California State Military Reserve. He was deployed stateside to New Jersey's Joint Base McGuire–Dix–Lakehurst for Operation Allies Welcome, which supported resettlement of approximately 130,000 refugees airlifted from Afghanistan following the U.S. withdrawal in 2021.

In October 2024, Hefner offered $100 million through his firm Hefner Capital to purchase Playboy with the parent company PLBY Group’s shares having declined roughly 99% from a high of $57.70 in May 2021. PLBY, which had reported a decline in revenue, said in August that it is re-launching Playboy magazine as an annual edition, as of February 2025.

== Personal life ==
In 2015, Hefner became engaged to British actress Scarlett Byrne, best known for her role as student Pansy Parkinson in the Harry Potter series. On November 4, 2019, Hefner and Byrne announced that they had married. On August 24, 2020, Byrne gave birth to their first daughter. On March 26, 2022, she gave birth to twin daughters.

Hefner teaches at Chapman University, where he also serves on the board of governors.

Hefner considered running for Congress in California's 37th congressional district in 2016. In July 2020, he announced his campaign as a Democrat for the California Senate in 2022, in the state's 30th District, but suspended his campaign four months later.

In 2022 Cooper became a Fellow of the German Marshall Fund.
