= India Allen =

American model and actress

Playboy centerfold appearance
- December 1987
- Preceded by: Pamela Stein
- Succeeded by: Kimberley Conrad

Playboy Playmate of the Year
- 1988
- Preceded by: Donna Edmondson
- Succeeded by: Kimberley Conrad

Personal details
- Born: June 1, 1965 (age 61) Portsmouth, Virginia, U.S.
- Height: 5 ft 11 in (1.80 m)

India Allen (born June 1, 1965) is an American actress and model. Allen was chosen as Playmate of the Month for December 1987 and was later named 1988's Playmate of the Year.

== Career ==
Allen was initially encouraged by her mother when she turned eighteen to pursue modeling and to try out for Playboy, but she was not interested. The suggestion came up again a few years later when her casting agent sent her to do a small role in a short film parody of Beverly Hills Cop II, in a role as a Playmate in the Playboy Mansion West scene. On the set of the film, Allen met Monique St. Pierre, Playboy's Playmate of the Year in 1979. Allen was surprised when one of the film's producers mentioned that St. Pierre was a Playmate and the two became friends. After looking through Allen's portfolio of modeling assignments, St. Pierre took her to Playboy's West Coast photo studios on Sunset Boulevard for test shots.

After her first pictorial, Allen continued to act and also appeared in a series of Playboy videos.

== Personal life ==
Allen was born in 1965 in Portsmouth, Virginia. In the early 1980s she was married to her Ball State University college beau. In September 1988 she was married for a short time to American sports broadcaster Bill Macatee. In 1996, Allen was a witness in the civil trial of O. J. Simpson and testified that she had seen Simpson strike his then-wife Nicole Brown Simpson in 1983 outside a veterinarian's office where Allen worked.

== Filmography ==
- The Force (1994)
- Silk Degrees (1994)
- Seduce Me: Pamela Principle 2 (1994)
- Wild Cactus (1993)
- Round Numbers (1992)

== See also ==
- List of people in Playboy 1980–1989

Luann Lee	Julie Peterson	Marina Baker	Anna Clark	Kymberly Paige	Sandy Greenberg
Carmen Berg	Sharry Konopski	Gwen Hajek	Brandi Brandt	Pamela Stein	India Allen
