= Rosie Tenison =

American actress and model (born 1968)

- Born: December 2, 1968 (age 57); Caldwell, Idaho, United States
- Occupations: Actress, Model
- Relatives: Renee Tenison (twin sister)

Rosie Tenison (born December 2, 1968) is an American actress and model. She is the twin sister of 1990's Playmate of the Year, Renee Tenison.

== Personal life and modeling career ==
Tenison was born in Caldwell, Idaho. She has three older brothers and an identical twin sister, Renee, who also works as a model. Rosie and Reneé posed in the August 2002 issue of Playboy magazine, together. Rosie was never a Playboy Playmate (whereas Renee was Playmate of the Month for November 1989 and Playmate of the Year for 1990).

== Filmography ==
=== Film ===
Year	Title	Role	Notes
1993	CB4	Twin	
1995	White Man's Burden	Detective	
1995	Edenquest: Pamela Anderson	Herself	

=== Television ===
Year	Title	Role	Notes
1991	Married... with Children	Mopsy	"Lookin' for a Desk in All the Wrong Places"
1996	Married... with Children	Carla	"Torch Song Duet"
1995	Martin	Essence	"Housekeeper from Hell"
1996	L.A. Heat	Rosie	"Rage"
1996	The Jamie Foxx Show	Naja	"Who's Da Man?"
1997	Malcolm & Eddie	Rosie	"Lockdown"
1999	The Steve Harvey Show	Candy	"Party of Five"
2003	The Parkers	Cookie	"She's a Bad Mamma Jamma"
2003	nContrast	Hostess	
