= Ava Fabian =

American model and actress (born 1962)

Playboy centerfold appearance
- August 1986
- Preceded by: Lynne Austin
- Succeeded by: Rebekka Armstrong

Personal details
- Born: April 4, 1962 (age 63) Brewster, New York
- Height: 5 ft 7 in (1.70 m)

Ava Fabian (born April 4, 1962, in Brewster, New York) is an American model and actress. She was chosen as Playboy's Playmate of the Month in August 1986 and has appeared in numerous Playboy videos. Her centerfold was photographed by Arny Freytag and Richard Fegley. Fabian is also a former Playboy Bunny.

Fabian played Roxy Carmichael in the movie Welcome Home, Roxy Carmichael, starring Winona Ryder. She has appeared in The Drew Carey Show and Married... with Children. Fabian had a recurring role in the 1996 Cinemax television series Erotic Confessions as a character named Jacqueline Stone.

In November 2011, she filed a lawsuit against former companion Neal Schon of Journey, claiming he owes her more than $25,000 for their "express oral nonmarital relationship agreement" when they lived together in San Anselmo. A previous hearing had been set for early October 2012, but was called off when the parties notified the court of an "unconditional settlement" in the case and was scheduled to be dismissed in November. Terms of the settlement were not disclosed in court filings.

In 1992, Ava Fabian opened Ava's, a restaurant in Los Angeles.

| Sherry Arnett | Julie McCullough | Kim Morris | Teri Weigel | Christine Richters | Rebecca Ferratti |
| Lynne Austin | Ava Fabian | Rebekka Armstrong | Katherine Hushaw | Donna Edmondson | Laurie Carr |
