= List of Playboy Playmates of 1982 =

The following is a list of Playboy Playmates of 1982. Playboy magazine names its Playmate of the Month each month throughout the year.

== January ==
Kimberly McArthur

Personal details
- Born: September 16, 1962 (age 63) Fort Worth, Texas, U.S.
- Height: 5 ft 3 in (1.60 m)

Kimberly McArthur (born September 16, 1962) is an American model and actress. She was Playboy magazine's Playmate of the Month for its January 1982 issue. Her centerfold was photographed by Arny Freytag.

After her appearance in Playboy, McArthur had guest starring roles on episodes of Magnum, P.I. and Highway to Heaven. She was the first of three actresses to replace Robin Wright in the role of Kelly Capwell on the NBC daytime soap Santa Barbara. She also played a role in Case Closed and Easy Money.

== February ==
Anne-Marie Fox

Personal details
- Born: September 28, 1962 (age 63) Los Angeles, California, U.S.
- Height: 5 ft 8 in (1.73 m)

Anne-Marie Fox (born September 28, 1962) was Playboy magazine's Playmate of the Month for February 1982.

== March ==
Karen Witter

Personal details
- Born: December 13, 1961 (age 64) Long Beach, California, U.S.
- Height: 5 ft 6 in (1.68 m)

Karen Rachel Witter (born December 13, 1961, in Long Beach, California) is an American model and actress. She was Playboy magazine's Playmate of the Month for its March 1982 issue, and her centerfold was photographed by Arny Freytag. Witter later appeared on the cover of the March 1983 issue.

Witter later appeared frequently in television series, and from 1990 to 1994 played Tina Lord on the soap opera One Life to Live, a role for which she was nominated for the 1991 Soap Opera Digest Award for Outstanding Female Newcomer in Daytime. Witter married TV producer Chuck Lorre in 2001; they had two children and are now divorced.

== April ==
Linda Rhys Vaughn

Personal details
- Born: August 11, 1959 (age 67) Grossmont, El Cajon, California, US
- Height: 5 ft 0.5 in (1.54 m)

Linda Rhys Vaughn (born August 11, 1959, in Grossmont, El Cajon, California) is an American model. She was Playboy magazine's Playmate of the Month for its April 1982 issue. Her centerfold was photographed by Pompeo Posar.

== May ==
Kym Malin

Personal details
- Born: July 31, 1962 (age 64) Dallas, Texas, US
- Height: 5 ft 5 in (1.65 m)

Kym Malin (born July 31, 1962, in Dallas, Texas) is an American model, dancer, and actress. She was Playboy magazine's Playmate of the Month for its May 1982 issue. Her centerfold was photographed by Pompeo Posar. She appeared in the 1983 comedy movie Joysticks, playing the role of Lola, appearing opposite Leif Green.

Malin had small roles in the mainstream features "Mike's Murder", "Weird Science", "Die Hard", and "Road House". She acted in four low-budget action flicks for director Andy Sidaris: "Picasso Trigger", "Guns", "Enemy Gold", and "The Dallas Connection". Malin eventually returned to her native Texas and attended community college. Kym Malin lives in upstate New York and manages a pediatrician's office.

== June ==
Lourdes Estores

Personal details
- Born: January 11, 1958 (age 68) Honolulu, Hawaii
- Height: 5 ft 3 in (1.60 m)

Lourdes Ann Kananimanu Estores (born January 11, 1958, in Honolulu, Hawaii) is an American model and actress of Hawaiian, Filipino, Spanish and Tahitian descent. She was Playboy magazine's Playmate of the Month for its June 1982 issue. Her centerfold was photographed by Ken Marcus. Estores first appeared in Playboy in the August 1980 "Girls of Hawaii" pictorial. She went on to become a flight attendant with Delta Air Lines.

== July ==
Lynda Wiesmeier

Personal details
- Born: May 30, 1963 Washington, D.C., U.S.
- Died: December 16, 2012 (aged 49) Ramona, California, U.S.
- Height: 5 ft 6 in (1.68 m)

Lynda Ann Wiesmeier (pronounced WEES-myer, born May 30, 1963, in Washington, D.C.) was an American actress and model. Wiesmeier was selected as both cover model and Playmate of the Month for the July 1982 issue of Playboy magazine, and her centerfold was photographed by Richard Fegley.

== August ==
Cathy St. George
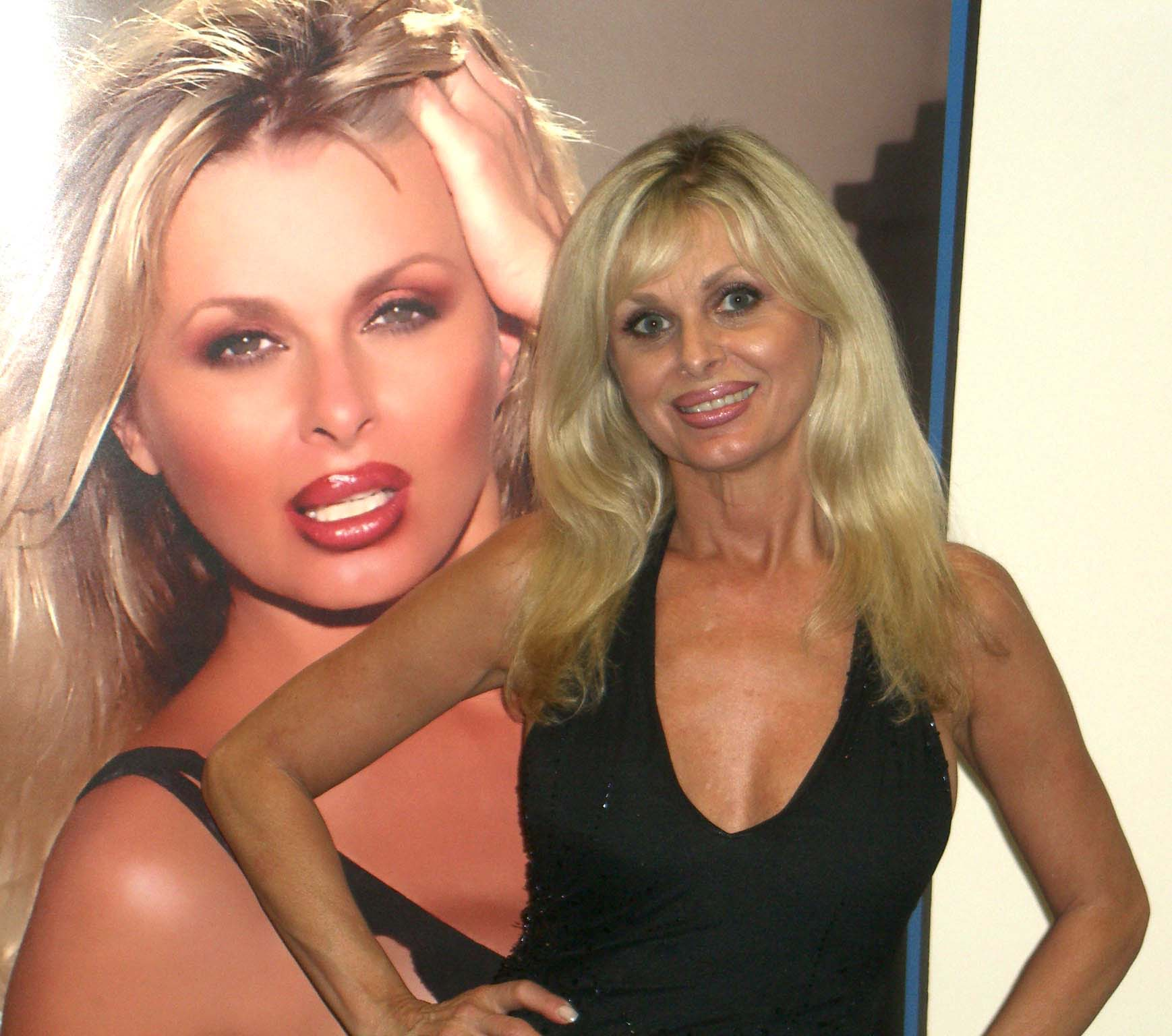
- St. George at the Big Apple Con, November 15, 2008

Personal details
- Born: August 23, 1954 (age 71) Norfolk, Virginia, U.S.
- Height: 5 ft 4 in (1.63 m)

Cathy St. George (born August 23, 1954, in Norfolk, Virginia) is an American model, actress, and make-up artist. She was Playboy magazine's Playmate of the Month for the August 1982 issue. Her centerfold was photographed by Ken Marcus. In May 2017, at the age of 62, St. George duplicated her Playboy cover along with her cohorts Kimberly Conrad, Renee Tenison, Candace Collins, Lisa Matthews, Charlotte Kemp, and Monique St. Pierre over three decades on.

== September ==
Connie Brighton

Personal details
- Born: May 14, 1959 (age 67) Wichita Falls, Texas, U.S.
- Height: 5 ft 7 in (1.70 m)

Connie Brighton (born May 14, 1959, in Wichita Falls, Texas) is an American model, actress and singer. She was Playboy magazine's Playmate of the Month for its September 1982 issue. Her centerfold was photographed by Richard Fegley.

== October ==
Marianne Gravatte

Playboy Playmate of the Year
- 1983
- Preceded by: Shannon Tweed
- Succeeded by: Barbara Edwards

Personal details
- Born: December 13, 1959 (age 66) Hollywood, California, U.S.
- Height: 5 ft 8 in (1.73 m)

Marianne Gravatte (born December 13, 1959, in Hollywood, California) is an American model and actress. She was chosen as Playboy magazine's Playmate of the Month for the October 1982 issue, then as the 1983 Playmate of the Year. Her original pictorial was photographed by Richard Fegley. She posed for Playboy again for the April 1994 "Playmate Revisited" feature. Gravatte was on the cover of Ratt's 1985 album, Invasion of Your Privacy.

== November ==
Marlene Janssen

Personal details
- Born: September 2, 1958 (age 67) Rock Island, Illinois, U.S.
- Height: 5 ft 9 in (1.75 m)

Marlene Janssen (born September 2, 1958, in Rock Island, Illinois) is an American model and actress. She was Playboy magazine's Playmate of the Month for its November 1982 issue. Her centerfold was photographed by Arny Freytag. She now lives in North Carolina, is divorced and has one son.

== December ==
Charlotte Kemp

Personal details
- Born: January 27, 1961 (age 65) Omaha, Nebraska, US
- Height: 5 ft 9 in (1.75 m)

Charlotte Kemp (born Charlotte Helmkamp, on January 27, 1961, in Omaha) is an American model and actress. She was Playboy magazine's Playmate of the Month for the December 1982 issue. Her centerfold was photographed by Ken Marcus. In May 2017, at the age of 56, Kemp duplicated her Playboy cover along with her cohorts Kimberley Conrad, Reneé Tenison, Candace Collins, Lisa Matthews, Cathy St. George, and Monique St. Pierre more than three decades on. In 2015, Kemp published a collection of stories from twenty former Playboy playmates.

== See also ==
- List of people in Playboy 1980–1989

Kimberly McArthur	Anne-Marie Fox	Karen Witter	Linda Rhys Vaughn	Kym Malin	Lourdes Estores
Lynda Wiesmeier	Cathy St. George	Connie Brighton	Marianne Gravatte	Marlene Janssen	Charlotte Kemp
