= Teri Weigel =

American pornographic film actress (born 1961/1962)

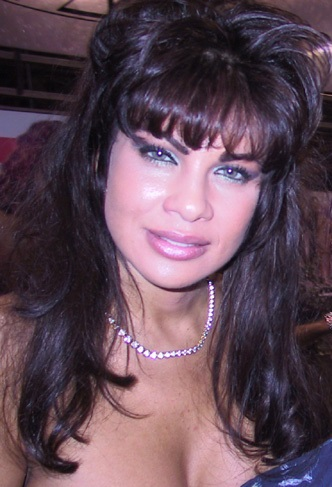
- Weigel in 2003

Playboy centerfold appearance
- April 1986
- Preceded by: Kim Morris
- Succeeded by: Christine Richters

Personal details
- Born: 1961 or 1962 (age 64–65) Fort Lauderdale, Florida, U.S.

Teri Weigel (born 1961 or 1962) is an American former pornographic film actress and Playboy Playmate. She was the April 1986 Playmate of the Month and later posed for Penthouse.

== Early life ==
Weigel was born in Fort Lauderdale, Florida and grew up in Deerfield Beach, Florida. She began modeling while in her teens, appearing in the Saks Fifth Avenue catalog among other venues.

== Career ==
Weigel appeared on the cover of the November 1985 issue of Playboy, and was the Playboy Playmate for April 1986. She also appeared in a number of Playboy videos. She subsequently had several minor roles in mainstream film, including Predator 2 and Marked for Death, and made several appearances as "Jade" on Married... with Children. She was the second Playmate to also appear in Penthouse magazine, after Ursula Buchfellner, November 1985.

Weigel was in a car accident in August 1990, in which she suffered severe neck and back injuries that required five operations. Unable to work for four months due to her injuries, she and her husband, Murrill Maglio, were forced to sell their home and move into an apartment. During production on a nude video that was one of Weigel's last projects for Playboy, a co-worker suggested doing adult movies to earn money. Initially dismissive of the idea, Weigel eventually reconsidered. Weigel and Maglio spoke to their neighbors, Fred and Patti Lincoln, who produced adult films.

Her first film was Inferno in 1991, in which she costarred with Marc Wallice. According to Weigel and Maglio, they did not see Weigel's sexual intercourse with other men as a problem because of the sense of security they felt in their relationship. Maglio has had minor, non-sexual roles in some of her films. To enhance her career viability, Weigel underwent breast augmentation, enlarging her breasts to 36DD. After she became the first Playboy Playmate to cross over into porn, the publisher terminated its relationship with her, as Playmates who do porn are not allowed to represent the company. Weigel's new career also hurt her relationship with her family, as her parents stopped speaking to her by 1992.

In 2000, Playboy sued Weigel over her use of the Playboy logo on her website.

== Personal life ==
Weigel married Murrill Maglio in December 1986. Maglio died on June 4, 2015, at the age of 63.

== Awards ==
- 2003 AVN Hall of Fame
- 2003 NightMoves Award – Best Feature Dancer (Editor's Choice)

== Selected filmography ==
Film
Year	Film	Role	Notes
1986	Playboy Video Centerfold: Teri Weigel	Herself	
1987	Playboy's Fantasies	Herself	
1988	Glitch!	Lydia	
1988	Cheerleader Camp	Pam Bently	Alternative title: Bloody Pom-Poms
1988	Return of the Killer Tomatoes	Matt's Playmate	
1989	Savage Beach	Anjelica	
1989	Playboy's Secrets of EuroMassage	Herself	
1989	The Banker	Jayne Marie Knott	
1989	Night Visitor	Victim In Cellar	
1989	Far from Home	Woman In Trailer	
1990	Marked for Death	Sexy Girl #2	
1990	Predator 2	Mary, Colombian Mistress	
1990	Wet & Wild II	Herself	
1991	Sexy Lingerie III	Herself	
1992	Innocent Blood	Melody, Lounge Dancer	Alternative title: A French Vampire in America
1992	Penthouse Fast Cars/Fantasy Women	Herself	
Television
Year	Title	Role	Notes
1988–1990	Married... with Children	Jade	4 episodes
1989	227	Gorgeous Girl	1 episode
2002	The Mind of the Married Man	Dolly	1 episode

Sherry Arnett	Julie McCullough	Kim Morris	Teri Weigel	Christine Richters	Rebecca Ferratti
Lynne Austin	Ava Fabian	Rebekka Armstrong	Katherine Hushaw	Donna Edmondson	Laurie Carr
