= Kari Kennell =

American model and actress (born 1964)

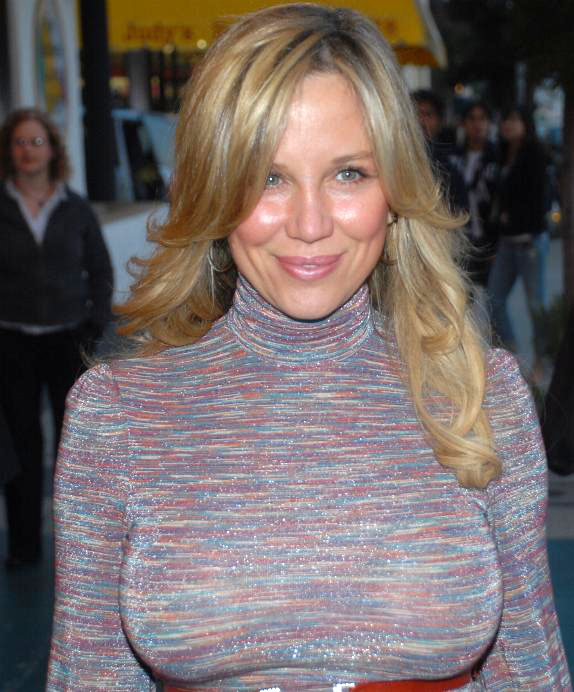

Playboy centerfold appearance
- February 1988
- Preceded by: Kimberley Conrad
- Succeeded by: Susie Owens

Personal details
- Born: Kari Kennell Whitman; June 24, 1964 (age 62) Colorado Springs, Colorado
- Height: 5 ft 5 in (1.65 m)

Kari Kennell Whitman (born June 21, 1964) is an American model and actress. She was chosen as Playboy's Playmate of the Month in February 1988. She also did mainstream acting as Kari Whitman appearing on Married... with Children (1989) in the episode 976-SHOE as Muffy.

== Career ==
While spending time in Florida, Kennell appeared in two episodes of the action drama Miami Vice. After becoming interested in acting, she moved to New York to seek out more roles. Then in 1987 Kennell moved to Los Angeles to further her career and had early parts in television commercials and comedy skits on the Tonight Show. It was around this time that she became involved with the animal rights organization PETA.

From the mid-1980s and throughout the 1990s, Kennell appeared in a variety of roles in television series, TV movies, and feature films. Some of these appearances include the action comedies Beverly Hills Cop II (1987) and Men at Work (1990) and television shows Baywatch, In Living Color, Silk Stalkings, Nash Bridges, The X-Files. and an appearance on Murder, She Wrote as the evil Marge Deaver. She also was a designer on the cable series about home remodeling show called Dude Room in 2004, a precursor to her own design show.

In May 2006, Kennell was given her own reality television show on the WE (Women's Entertainment) Television Network. The series was titled Designer To The Stars: Kari Whitman and featured her redesigning rooms within celebrity homes. The series aired in March 2007.

== Advocacy ==
A staunch animal rights supporter, Kennell protested the National Hot Dog and Sausage Council's Annual Hot Dog Lunch on Capitol Hill, on Wednesday, July 21, 2004. Representing PETA, and wearing plastic lettuce-leaf bikinis, Kennell and fellow Playboy Playmate Lauren Anderson (Miss July 2002) sold vegetable hot dogs to members of Congress outside the Rayburn Office Building in Washington D.C. The courtyard inside the building was the location for the 2004 Hot Dog Lunch, which was sponsored by the American Meat Institute and the National Hot Dog and Sausage Council. The annual luncheon is a celebration of "National Hot Dog Month", which is the month of July.

== Personal life ==
Kennell was born in Colorado Springs, Colorado. She spent her early years going back and forth between the Rockies and Dunedin, Florida. Kari founded Kari Whitman Interiors in 1994 as a design build firm specializing in high-end residential interior design.

Kimberley Conrad	Kari Kennell	Susie Owens	Eloise Broady	Diana Lee	Emily Arth
Terri Lynn Doss	Helle Michaelsen	Laura Richmond	Shannon Long	Pia Reyes	Kata Kärkkäinen
