= Susie Owens =

American model and businesswoman (born 1956)

Playboy centerfold appearance
- March 1988
- Preceded by: Kari Kennell
- Succeeded by: Eloise Broady

Personal details
- Born: Susie Diane Owens; May 28, 1956 (age 70) Arkansas City, Kansas, US
- Height: 5 ft 8 in (1.73 m)

Susie Diane Owens (born May 28, 1956) is an American model and businesswoman. She was chosen as Playmate of the Month for March 1988. From 1988 to 2016, she worked in the perfume business, creating the fragrances Child for women and Heir for men.

== Early life and education ==
Owens was born on May 28, 1956, in Arkansas City, Kansas, and raised in Oklahoma. She obtained a nursing degree and worked in Dallas as a model and stripper.

== Career ==
=== Model and actress ===
In 1983 Owens appeared in her first Playboy pictorial. She was featured as Playboy's Playmate of the Month for March 1988, when she was 31. Afterwards, she moved to Los Angeles, living in the Playboy Mansion. She dated rock star Bret Michaels and worked as a B-movie actress.

Owens also worked as a mascot for the Golden Apple Comics stores, playing Flaxen, a dowdy nurse who is transformed into an attractive blonde superheroine who must investigate fraud in a nuclear power plant. Her portrayal of Flaxen served as the basis for the 1992 comic book of the same name, The 1992 Comics was written by Mark Evanier and drawn by Richard Howell with ink by Tim Burgard and Jim Mooney, the cover is a painting by Steve Rude and published by 'Golden Apple Comics' Distributed by Dark Horse Comics A second comic book, Flaxen: Alter-Ego was produced in 1995 and was written by James Hudnall, pencilled by Brian Michael Bendis, and inked by David W. Mack it was Published Caliber Press, as well as the 1995 sequel Flaxen: Alter Ego.

=== Perfume business ===
In 1988, Owens experimented with perfume supplies, creating the fragrance she would later call "Child". She began to wear it herself, and then to bottle small batches for sale in Fred Segal's Apothia and other boutiques. Following the 1994 Northridge earthquake and the death of her father, Owens decided to give up her career at Playboy and return to Dallas. She worked as a nurse in a plastic surgery practice, while continuing to sell perfume on the side under the name Susan D. Owens.

In 2000, the actress Jennie Garth told InStyle magazine that Child "drives men wild", causing a sharp increase in demand. Owens left her nursing job and began making fragrances full-time. In addition to Child, she developed the men's scent Heir. She blended and bottled the products by hand in her garage; by 2006, she was producing 50,000 bottles of Child perfume and lotion per year. Child acquired a cult following, with celebrities such as Madonna and Jennifer Aniston reportedly using it. A reporter for the lifestyle magazine 360 West characterised Child as "a heady white jasmine-based fragrance". In 2013, a 1-ounce bottle cost almost US$100. Owens sold the business in 2016 to the cosmetics retailer Beautyhabit.

== Personal life ==
Owens is divorced and has one daughter.

Kimberley Conrad	Kari Kennell	Susie Owens	Eloise Broady	Diana Lee	Emily Arth
Terri Lynn Doss	Helle Michaelsen	Laura Richmond	Shannon Long	Pia Reyes	Kata Kärkkäinen
