= Kimberley Conrad =

American Playmate (born 1962)

- Born: Kimberley Conradt; August 6, 1962 (age 64); Moulton, Alabama, U.S.
- Spouse: Hugh Hefner (m. 1989; div. 2010)
- Children: 2, including Cooper Hefner

Playboy centerfold appearance
- January 1988
- Preceded by: India Allen
- Succeeded by: Kari Kennell

Playboy Playmate of the Year
- 1989
- Preceded by: India Allen
- Succeeded by: Renee Tenison

Personal details
- Height: 5 ft 9 in (1.75 m)

Kimberley Conrad (née Conradt; August 6, 1962) is an American model. She was chosen as Playmate of the Month in January 1988 and became Playmate of the Year in 1989. Conrad was Hugh Hefner's second wife and is mother to two of his four children. Nearly three decades later in May 2017, at the age of 54, she duplicated her Playmate of the Year cover along with Renee Tenison, Candace Collins, Lisa Matthews, Cathy St. George, Charlotte Kemp, and Monique St. Pierre.

== Personal life ==
Conrad's marriage to Playboy founder Hugh Hefner in July 1989 drew worldwide media attention. The comic strip Doonesbury referred to the event as the belated end of the 1970s. The Hefners had two sons together: Marston Glenn Hefner (who shares his birthday with his father: April 9, 1990) and Cooper Bradford Hefner (September 4, 1991). Conrad transformed the Playboy Mansion into a more traditional household for her children.

After nine years of marriage, Conrad and Hefner separated although remained legally married. Hugh Hefner was quoted, "I would've been happy to divorce her when we separated, but she wanted to remain married for our boys." Conrad then moved into a house next door to the Playboy Mansion. After an 11-year separation, Hefner filed for divorce stating irreconcilable differences in September 2009 after his youngest child turned 18; the divorce was finalized in March 2010.

== See also ==
- List of people in Playboy 1980–1989

Kimberley Conrad	Kari Kennell	Susie Owens	Eloise Broady	Diana Lee	Emily Arth
Terri Lynn Doss	Helle Michaelsen	Laura Richmond	Shannon Long	Pia Reyes	Kata Kärkkäinen
