= List of Playboy Playmates of 1979 =

The following is a list of Playboy Playmates of 1979, the 25th anniversary year of the publication. Playboy magazine names its Playmate of the Month each month throughout the year.

== January ==
Candy Loving

Personal details
- Born: Candis Loving; September 4, 1956 (age 70) Oswego, Kansas, U.S.
- Height: 5 ft 7 in (1.70 m)

Candis "Candy" Loving (born September 4, 1956) is an American model. She was Playboy's Playmate of the Month for the January 1979 issue, which made her Playboy's 25th Anniversary Playmate. Her centerfold was photographed by Dwight Hooker.

== February ==
Lee Ann Michelle

Personal details
- Born: 17 March 1960 (age 66) Surrey, England
- Height: 5 ft 4 in (1.63 m)

Lee Ann Michelle (real name Carol Needham) (born 17 March 1960) is an English model and actress. Under her birth name she had posed topless in British newspapers. She was chosen as Playboy magazine's Playmate of the Month for the February 1979 issue. Her centerfold was photographed by Mario Casilli.

== March ==
Denise McConnell

Personal details
- Born: December 23, 1958 (age 67) Wiesbaden, Germany
- Height: 5 ft 3 in (1.60 m)

Denise McConnell (born December 23, 1958) is an American model. She was Playboy magazine's Playmate of the Month for its March 1979 issue. Her centerfold was photographed by Nicholas DeSciose and Pompeo Posar.

== April ==
Missy Cleveland

Personal details
- Born: December 25, 1959 Jackson, Mississippi
- Died: August 14, 2001 (aged 41) (adverse reaction to prescription medication)
- Height: 5 ft 4 in (1.63 m)

Amanda "Missy" Hodges Cleveland (December 25, 1959 – August 14, 2001) was an American model and actress. She was Playboy magazine's Playmate of the Month for the April 1979 issue. Her centrefold was photographed by Mario Casilli.

Cleveland was born in Jackson, Mississippi and attended Provine High School and McClure Academy. She came to the magazine's attention through its 25th Anniversary Great Playmate Hunt. Her death, which resulted from side effects of a prescription drug, occurred the year she would have reached the age of 42. She was a property manager.

== May ==
Michele Drake

Personal details
- Born: February 7, 1958 (age 68) La Jolla, California, U.S.
- Height: 5 ft 5 in (1.65 m)

Michele Drake (born February 7, 1958) is an American model and actress. She was Playboy magazine's Playmate of the Month for its May 1979 issue and a member of Playboy's vocal group, The Singing Playmates.

== June ==
Louann Fernald

Personal details
- Born: October 23, 1957 (age 69) San Antonio, Texas, U.S.
- Height: 5 ft 4.5 in (1.64 m)

Louann Fernald (born October 23, 1957) is an American lawyer and former model and actress. She was Playboy magazine's Playmate of the Month for its June 1979 issue. Her centerfold was photographed by Dwight Hooker.

== July ==
Dorothy Mays

Personal details
- Born: July 24, 1957 (age 69) Nuremberg, Germany
- Height: 5 ft 7 in (1.70 m)

Dorothy Mays (born July 24, 1957) is an American model and actress. She was chosen as Playboy magazine's Playmate of the Month for the July 1979 issue. Her centerfold was photographed by Richard Fegley.

== August ==
Dorothy Stratten

Playboy Playmate of the Year
- 1980
- Preceded by: Monique St. Pierre
- Succeeded by: Terri Welles

Personal details
- Born: February 28, 1960 Vancouver, British Columbia, Canada
- Died: August 14, 1980 (aged 20)
- Height: 5 ft 9 in (1.75 m)

Dorothy Stratten (February 28, 1960 – August 14, 1980) was a Canadian model and actress. Stratten found fame as the Playboy Playmate of the Month for August 1979 and subsequently Playmate of the Year for 1980. Stratten is remembered for the circumstances of her murder at age 20 by her estranged husband, an act that was the basis of two motion pictures.

== September ==
Vicky McCarty

Personal details
- Born: Vicki Ann McCarty; January 13, 1954 (age 72) Los Angeles, California, U.S.
- Height: 5 ft 7 in (1.70 m)

Vicki McCarty Iovine (born Vicki Ann McCarty; January 13, 1954) is an American model, writer, and lawyer. She is a former member of the board of directors of the Special Olympics, as well as a former television producer and radio talk show host. She was Playboy magazine's Playmate of the Month for its September 1979 issue and was photographed by Arny Freytag. She was divorced from her first husband, record producer and founder of Interscope Records Jimmy Iovine, with whom she has four children. In May 2014, she married David Coiro. She has published several books pertaining to pregnancy and parenthood under the brand of Girlfriends' Guides, as well as Best Friends' Guides.

== October ==
Ursula Buchfellner

Personal details
- Born: 8 June 1961 (age 65) Munich, Germany
- Height: 5 ft 6 in (1.68 m)

Ursula Buchfellner (born 8 June 1961) is a German model and actress. She was Playboy magazine's Playmate of the Month for its October 1979 issue. Her centerfold was photographed by Peter Weissbrich. Buchfellner also was the Playmate for the December 1977 issue of Playboy's German edition.

In her later modeling and acting work, she was sometimes credited as Uschi Buchfellner, Ursula Fellner, Ulla Maris and Ursula Maris. Most of her movie roles were in European B-movies.

== November ==
Sylvie Garant

Personal details
- Born: September 23, 1957 (age 69) Montmagny, Quebec, Canada
- Height: 5 ft 7 in (1.70 m)

Sylvie Garant (born September 23, 1957) is a Canadian model. She was Playboy magazine's Playmate of the Month for its November 1979 issue. Her centerfold was photographed by Richard Fegley. She served as hostess for one season of the late 1970s game show The $128,000 Question and later served as hostess on another Canadian game show, The Joke's on Us.

== December ==
Candace Collins

Personal details
- Born: May 26, 1957 (age 69) Dupo, Illinois, U.S.
- Height: 5 ft 7 in (1.70 m)
- Official website

Candace Collins (born May 26, 1957) is an American model and actress. She was Playboy magazine's Playmate of the Month for its December 1979 issue. Her centerfold was photographed by Richard Fegley. She was a 9-time cover girl (two US, seven international), and her February 1980 iconic "eyes" cover was chosen as Cover of the Year by Marketing Bestsellers Association. Collins was also a Playboy Bunny at the St. Louis club and Chicago Playboy Bunny of the Year in 1976. The issue Collins appeared in was 410 pages, the largest issue Playboy ever published.

Professionally, she now goes by the name Candace Jordan, as a television host, popular media personality in Chicago, and onetime Chicago Tribune social columnist. In May 2017, at the age of 59, Collins duplicated her cover along with her cohorts Kimberley Conrad, Renee Tenison, Lisa Matthews, Cathy St. George, Charlotte Kemp, and Monique St. Pierre nearly four decades on.

== See also ==
- List of people in Playboy 1970–1979

Candy Loving	Lee Ann Michelle	Denise McConnell	Missy Cleveland	Michele Drake	Louann Fernald
Dorothy Mays	Dorothy Stratten	Vicki McCarty	Ursula Buchfellner	Sylvie Garant	Candace Collins
