= List of Playboy Playmates of 1986 =

The following is a list of Playboy Playmates of 1986. Playboy magazine names their Playmate of the Month each month throughout the year.

== January ==
Sherry Arnett

Personal details
- Born: October 2, 1964 (age 61) St. Louis, Missouri, U.S.
- Height: 5 ft 5 in (1.65 m)

Sherry Arnett (born October 2, 1964) is an American model and actress. She was Playboy magazine's Playmate of the Month for January 1986. Her centerfold was photographed by Richard Fegley. Her first Playboy appearance in the magazine came in September 1984's "Girls of the Big Ten", billed as "Sherry Klemesrud". She also appeared on the October 1985 cover.

== February ==
Julie Michelle McCullough
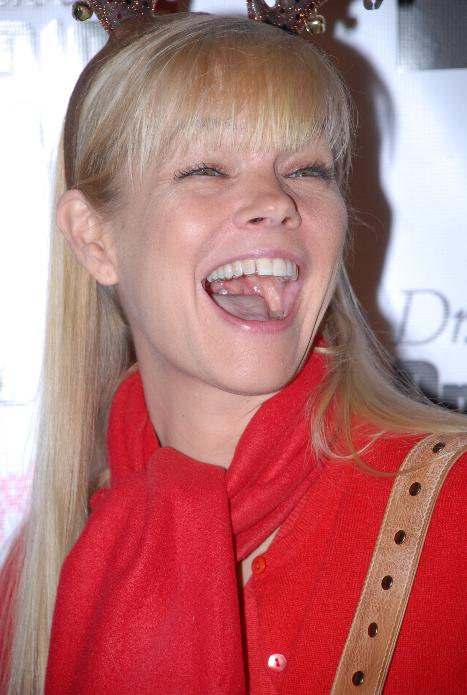

Personal details
- Born: January 30, 1965 (age 61) Honolulu, Hawaii, U.S.
- Height: 5 ft 7 in (1.70 m)

Julie Michelle McCullough (born January 30, 1965) is an American model, actress and stand-up comedian. She was Playboy magazine's Playmate of the Month for February 1986, and played "Julie Costello" on Growing Pains for eleven episodes during the 1989–1990 season.

== March ==
Kim Morris

Personal details
- Born: October 7, 1958 (age 67) San Diego, California, U.S.
- Height: 5 ft 6 in (1.68 m)

Kim Morris (born October 7, 1958, in San Diego, California) is an American model and actress. She was Playboy magazine's Playmate of the Month for its March 1986 issue. Her centerfold was photographed by Ken Marcus and Stephen Wayda.

== April ==
Teri Weigel
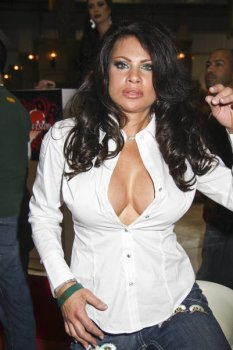
- Teri Weigel at the 2008 AVN Adult Entertainment Expo.

Personal details
- Born: Teresa Susan Weigel; February 24, 1962 (age 64) Ft. Lauderdale, Florida, U.S.
- Height: 5 ft 7 in (1.70 m)

Teresa "Teri" Susan Weigel (born February 24, 1962) is an American pornographic actress, former mainstream film and television actress, and Playboy Playmate.

== May ==
Christine Richters

Personal details
- Born: August 3, 1966 (age 60) Fullerton, California, U.S.
- Height: 5 ft 6 in (1.68 m)

Christine Richters (born August 3, 1966, in Fullerton, California) is an American model. She was Playboy's Playmate of the Month for May 1986.

== June ==
Rebecca Ferratti

Personal details
- Born: November 27, 1964 (age 61) Helena, Montana, U.S.
- Height: 5 ft 5 in (1.65 m)

Rebecca Michelle Ferratti (born November 27, 1964) is an actress, model, and dancer. She has worked in over 25 movies. She has been a dancer in many music videos and has posed in many magazines, including Playboy. She was Playmate of the Month in the June 1986 issue.

== July ==
Lynne Austin

Personal details
- Born: April 15, 1961 (age 65) Plant City, Florida, U.S.
- Height: 5 ft 6 in (1.68 m)

Lynne Austin (born April 15, 1961, in Plant City, Florida) is an American model and actress. She was chosen as Playboy's Playmate of the Month in July, 1986 and has appeared in numerous Playboy videos and was named the 1987 Dutch Playmate of the Year. Before Playboy, she had appeared in an ad campaign as the original "Hooters girl".

== August ==
Ava Fabian

Personal details
- Born: April 4, 1962 (age 64) Brewster, New York, U.S.
- Height: 5 ft 7 in (1.70 m)

Ava Fabian (born April 4, 1962, Brewster, New York) is an American model and actress. She was chosen as Playboy's Playmate of the Month in August 1986 and has appeared in Playboy videos. Her centerfold was photographed by Arny Freytag and Richard Fegley. Fabian is also a former Playboy Bunny.

== September ==
Rebekka Armstrong

Personal details
- Born: February 20, 1967 (age 59) Bakersfield, California, U.S.
- Height: 5 ft 7 in (1.70 m)

Rebekka Lynn Armstrong (born February 20, 1967, in Bakersfield, California) is a Playboy Playmate, actress and competitive bodybuilder. In 1994 she announced that she was HIV-positive.

== October ==
Katherine Hushaw

Personal details
- Born: October 23, 1963 (age 62) Anaheim, California, U.S.
- Height: 5 ft 6 in (1.68 m)

Katherine Hushaw (born October 23, 1963) is an American model and actress. She was chosen as Playboy's Playmate of the Month in October, 1986.

== November ==
Donna Edmondson

Playboy Playmate of the Year
- 1987
- Preceded by: Kathy Shower
- Succeeded by: India Allen

Personal details
- Born: February 1, 1966 (age 60) Greensboro, North Carolina, U.S.
- Height: 5 ft 10 in (1.78 m)

Donna Edmondson (born February 1, 1966, in Greensboro, North Carolina, United States) was chosen as Playboy's Playmate of the Month for November 1986 and Playmate of the Year for 1987. It was noted that she was a Southern Baptist and a virgin at the time of her appearances, and that it was her father that encouraged her to apply to be a Playmate. After her appearance in the magazine, she went on to appear in seven Playboy videos. In 2001, the readers of Playboy voted her into fourth place for "the sexiest Playmate of the 1980s."

== December ==
Laurie Ann Carr

Personal details
- Born: December 11, 1965 (age 60) Dallas, Texas, U.S.
- Height: 5 ft 7 in (1.70 m)

Laurie Ann Carr (born December 11, 1965) is an American model and actress. She was chosen as Playboy's Playmate of the Month in December, 1986. She appeared on the covers of Slaughter's Stick It to Ya and Stick It Live. Carr was married to Robbin Crosby, guitarist for the band Ratt, from 1987 to 1991.

== See also ==
- List of people in Playboy 1980–1989

Sherry Arnett	Julie McCullough	Kim Morris	Teri Weigel	Christine Richters	Rebecca Ferratti
Lynne Austin	Ava Fabian	Rebekka Armstrong	Katherine Hushaw	Donna Edmondson	Laurie Carr
