= Dean Cundey =

American cinematographer and film director

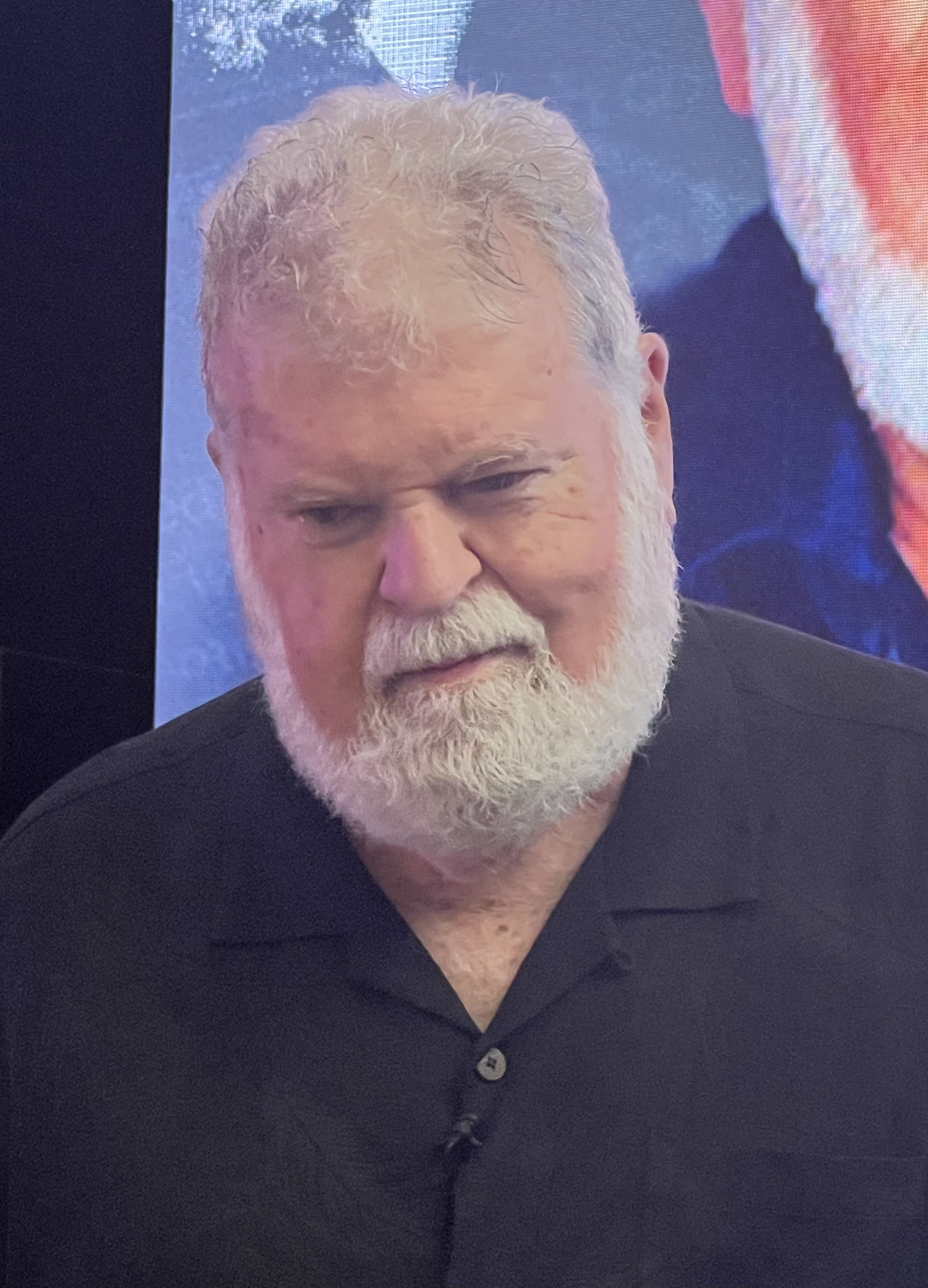
- Cundey in 2025
- Born: Dean Raymond Cundey; March 12, 1946 (age 80); Alhambra, California, U.S.
- Years active: 1971–present
- Organisation: American Society of Cinematographers

Dean Raymond Cundey, A.S.C. (born March 12, 1946) is an American cinematographer and film director.

A frequent collaborator with filmmakers such as Nancy Meyers, Brian Levant, John Carpenter, Robert Zemeckis and Steven Spielberg, Cundey's most notable credits include Halloween (1978), Escape from New York (1981), The Thing (1982), the Back to the Future trilogy (1985-1990), Big Trouble in Little China (1986), Who Framed Roger Rabbit (1988), Hook (1991), Jurassic Park (1993), Apollo 13 (1995), and Jack and Jill (2011).

Cundey was nominated for an Academy Award for Best Cinematography, and has been nominated for numerous BAFTAs and BSC Awards.

== Early life ==
He was born in Alhambra, California, United States. As a child, he used to build model sets, suggesting an interest in films from an early age.

== Career ==
Cundey already had several low-budget films when he met Debra Hill, who in 1978 recruited him to work on Halloween, a film she co-wrote with director John Carpenter.

Having Cundey work on a film brought considerable advantages. In addition to his considerable skill as a cinematographer and director of photography, he also had the advantage of owning most of his own equipment packed in a large van, referred to by Debra Hill as the "movie van".

Cundey's work on Halloween is cited by many fans as being among his best as director of photography. In addition to his lighting skills, particularly in the famous hallway scene where the hidden face of Michael Myers is slowly revealed by way of a blue light next to the mask, he was among the first cinematographers to make use of a recent invention called the steadicam, or panaglide.

The panaglide allowed the camera operator to "wear" the camera and obtain shots that were previously deemed too difficult or even impossible. In Halloween, the panaglide was used as a point of view reference for Michael Myers, allowing the audience to see what he saw.

Cundey would go on to work with Carpenter and Hill again on the films The Fog (1980), Escape from New York, Halloween II (both 1981), The Thing, and Halloween III: Season of the Witch (both 1982). He would also return to work with Carpenter for the last time on the 1986 big budget fantasy/comedy adventure Big Trouble in Little China.

He also was director of photography on the 4D film Honey, I Shrunk the Audience!, which ran in five Walt Disney theme parks around the world.

=== Later work ===
In addition to his work with Carpenter, Cundey worked on the films Psycho II (1983), Romancing the Stone (1984), the Back to the Future trilogy (1985–1990), Who Framed Roger Rabbit (1988), Road House (1989), Jurassic Park (1993), Apollo 13 (1995), What Women Want (2000), and Garfield: The Movie (2004), among others. In 1997, he made his directorial debut with the direct-to-video sequel Honey, We Shrunk Ourselves.

He worked in Canada on Camp Rock, one of several movies that he has filmed outside the United States, including Who Framed Roger Rabbit which was filmed primarily in England.

In 2011, Cundey shot the comedy film Jack and Jill, which involved extensive split-screen and motion control effects to create the illusion of actor Adam Sandler interacting with multiple on-screen personas.

== Filmography ==
=== Film ===
Year	Title	Director	Notes
1973	The No Mercy Man	Daniel Vance	
1974	Where the Red Fern Grows	Norman Tokar	
1974	So Evil, My Sister	Reginald LeBorg	
1976	The Witch Who Came From the Sea	Matt Cimber	Associate DOP
1976	Ilsa, Harem Keeper of the Oil Sheiks	Don Edmonds	With Glenn Roland
1976	Black Shampoo	Greydon Clark	With Michael Mileham
1976	Creature from Black Lake	Joy N. Houck Jr.	
1976	The Human Tornado	Cliff Roquemore	Credited as "Gene Condie"
1977	Satan's Cheerleaders	Greydon Clark	
1977	Bare Knuckles	Don Edmonds	
1977	Charge of the Model T's	Jim McCullough Sr.	
1978	Hi-Riders	Greydon Clark	
1978	Goodbye, Franklin High	Mike MacFarland	
1978	Halloween	John Carpenter	
1979	Angels' Brigade	Greydon Clark	
1979	Rock 'n' Roll High School	Allan Arkush	
1979	Roller Boogie	Mark L. Lester	
1980	The Fog	John Carpenter	
1980	Galaxina	William Sachs	
1980	Without Warning	Greydon Clark	
1981	Escape from New York	John Carpenter	
1981	Jaws of Satan	Bob Claver	
1981	Halloween II	Rick Rosenthal	
1982	The Thing	John Carpenter	
1982	Halloween III: Season of the Witch	Tommy Lee Wallace	
1983	Psycho II	Richard Franklin	
1983	D.C. Cab	Joel Schumacher	
1984	Romancing the Stone	Robert Zemeckis	
1985	Back to the Future	Robert Zemeckis	
1985	Warning Sign	Hal Barwood	
1986	Big Trouble in Little China	John Carpenter	
1987	Project X	Jonathan Kaplan	
1988	Big Business	Jim Abrahams	
1988	Who Framed Roger Rabbit	Robert Zemeckis	
1989	Road House	Rowdy Herrington	
1989	Back to the Future Part II	Robert Zemeckis	Shot back-to-back
1990	Back to the Future Part III	Robert Zemeckis	Shot back-to-back
1991	Nothing but Trouble	Dan Aykroyd	
1991	Hook	Steven Spielberg	
1992	Death Becomes Her	Robert Zemeckis	
1993	Jurassic Park	Steven Spielberg	
1994	The Flintstones	Brian Levant	
1995	Casper	Brad Silberling	
1995	Apollo 13	Ron Howard	
1997	Flubber	Les Mayfield	
1998	Krippendorf's Tribe	Todd Holland	
1998	The Parent Trap	Nancy Meyers	
2000	What Women Want	Nancy Meyers	
2003	Looney Tunes: Back in Action	Joe Dante	
2004	Garfield: The Movie	Peter Hewitt	
2006	The Holiday	Nancy Meyers	
2007	Whisper	Stewart Hendler	
2009	Shannon's Rainbow	Frank E. Johnson	
2010	The Spy Next Door	Brian Levant	
2011	Jack and Jill	Dennis Dugan	
2013	Crazy Kind of Love	Sarah Siegel-Magness	
2014	Walking with the Enemy	Mark Schmidt	
2014	Freedom	Peter Cousens	
2015	The Girl in the Photographs	Nick Simon	
2015	Diablo	Lawrence Roeck	
2017	Slamma Jamma	Timothy A. Chey	
2017	Home Again	Hallie Meyers-Shyer	
2020	Anastasia: Once Upon a Time	Blake Harris	

=== Television ===
Year	Title	Notes
1981–84	Tales of the Unexpected	4 episodes
1983	The Invisible Woman	Television film
1984	Amazons	Television film
1984	Invitation to Hell	Television film
1984	It Came Upon the Midnight Clear	Television film
1989	Tales from the Crypt	Episode: "And All Through the House"
2001	Religion & Ethics Newsweekly	Episode: "The Face: Jesus in Art"
2005	The West Wing	2 episodes
2008	Camp Rock	Television film
2010	Scooby-Doo! Curse of the Lake Monster	Television film
2022	The Book of Boba Fett	2 episodes
2023	The Mandalorian	3 episodes

=== Other credits ===
Director

- Honey, We Shrunk Ourselves (1997)

2nd unit director

- Deep Rising (1998)
- Garfield: A Tail of Two Kitties (2006)

Cameos

Year	Title	Role
1990	Back to the Future Part III	Photographer
1993	Jurassic Park	Mate
1994	The Flintstones	Technician

== Awards and recognition ==
Academy Awards

Year	Award	Title	Result
1988	Best Cinematography	Who Framed Roger Rabbit	Nominated

American Society of Cinematographers

Year	Award	Title	Result
1991	Outstanding Achievement in Cinematography	Hook	Nominated
1995	Outstanding Achievement in Cinematography	Apollo 13	Nominated
2014	Lifetime Achievement Award		Won

BAFTA Awards

Year	Award	Title	Result
1988	Best Cinematography	Who Framed Roger Rabbit	Nominated
1995	Best Cinematography	Apollo 13	Nominated

British Society of Cinematographers

Year	Award	Title	Result
1988	Best Cinematography	Who Framed Roger Rabbit	Nominated
1995	Best Cinematography	Apollo 13	Nominated

Chicago Film Critics Association

Year	Award	Title	Result
1995	Best Cinematography	Apollo 13	Nominated

Society of Camera Operators

Year	Award	Result
1999	President's Award	Won

Daytime Emmy Awards

Year	Award	Title	Result
2001	Outstanding Cinematography	Religion & Ethics Newsweekly: The Face: Jesus in Art	Won

Primetime Emmy Awards

Year	Award	Title	Result
2023	Outstanding Cinematography for a Series (Half-Hour)	The Mandalorian (For episode "Chapter 20: The Foundling")	Nominated
