= Black Shampoo =

1976 film by Greydon Clark

- Directed by: Greydon Clark
- Written by: Greydon Clark; Alvin Fast
- Produced by: Alvin Fast
- Starring: John Daniels; Tanya Boyd; Joe Ortiz; Skip E. Lowe
- Cinematography: Dean Cundey
- Edited by: Earl Watson
- Music by: Gerald Lee
- Distributed by: Dimension Pictures
- Release date: March 5, 1976
- Running time: 85 minutes
- Country: United States
- Language: English
- Budget: $50,000

Black Shampoo is an American exploitation film directed by Greydon Clark. Released in 1976, the comedy film is considered an example of the blaxploitation and sexploitation subgenres of exploitation film. Produced on a budget of $50,000, the film stars John Daniels as Jonathan Knight, an African American businessman and hairdresser who frequently has sex with his predominantly white female clients, and Tanya Boyd as Brenda, Jonathan's secretary and girlfriend, who was previously in a relationship with a white mob boss, who, out of jealousy towards his ex's new lover, begins to regularly send goons to trash Jonathan's hair salon. The violence escalates as the film progresses.

Clark purposely did not want to make a film that featured character archetypes that typically led blaxploitation films, such as pimps, private detectives or drug dealers, and set out to make a film in which an African American businessman was the lead, instead of more stereotypical blaxploitation characters. The screenplay, written by Clark and Alvin Fast, was described by Clark as a mix of comedy, sex and violence. Clark drew inspiration from the 1975 film Shampoo; the film is observed to be an example of a common form of blaxploitation filmmaking in which a previous popular film starring a predominantly white cast is imitated with a predominantly African American cast. The characters of Jonathan and Brenda have been analyzed as examples of black characters whose blackness is perceived as a commodity by their white lovers, while Jonathan is seen as a Mandingo archetype.

== Plot ==
Jonathan Knight is the owner of "Mr. Jonathan's", the most successful hair salon for women on the Sunset Strip. His reputation as a lover has become as such that he is sought after almost as much for sexual trysts as he is for his hair styling ability. He is also dating his young attractive receptionist, Brenda (Tanya Boyd), whose former boss and lover, a white mobster, has become jealous of Jonathan. The mobster has begun sending his goons to intimidate Jonathan and his employees by trashing the hair salon. As the mobsters' violence escalates to include the sexual assault of a homosexual employee and the kidnapping of Brenda, Jonathan uses a chainsaw to exact revenge on the mobsters.

== Cast ==
- John Daniels as Jonathan
- Tanya Boyd as Brenda St. John
- Joe Ortiz as Mr. Wilson
- Skip E. Lowe as Artie
- Gary Allen as Richard
- Anne Gaybis as Mrs. Phillips
- William Bonner as Maddox
- Bruce Kerley as Jackson

== Development ==
Director Greydon Clark had previously explored racial themes in his film The Bad Bunch (1973), which had also been released under the title Nigger Lover, and would subsequently explore these themes again in his later film Skinheads (1989). After screening The Bad Bunch for MGM in the hopes that the studio would distribute the film, Clark was told by the studio's executives that they were not willing to release the film because the depiction of white cops as beating and harassing black men and using racist language would offend police officers. After the film was released through another studio and showed a financial profit, Clark wanted to make another exploitation film with African American characters, but while blaxploitation film protagonists were often pimps, private detectives or drug dealers, Clark did not want to make a film about these characters, and decided to take inspiration from the 1975 hit film Shampoo by making his protagonist a businessman and hairdresser. The practice of producing a film that imitates previous successful films starring white actors, recast with entirely African American casts, was common in blaxploitation, with other examples including Black Lolita (1975, titled after Lolita), The Black Godfather (1974, titled after The Godfather) and Dr. Black, Mr. Hyde (1976, titled after Strange Case of Dr Jekyll and Mr Hyde). In addition to being an example of a blaxploitation film, Black Shampoo is also considered a sexploitation film. Clark cowrote Black Shampoo with screenwriter Alvin Fast, as a mix of comedy, violence and sex. Clark and Fast's screenplay depicts Jonathan as an example of the Mandingo stereotype, and derived many of the script's sex scenes from interracial cuckolding culture, depicting the white sexual partners of Jonathan and Brenda as viewing their blackness as a commodity. The film's depiction of homosexual and female characters is considered to be homophobic and sexist, with the homosexual characters being portrayed as little more than dated, offensive stereotypes and the female characters as little more than the object of sexual desire for male characters.

For the casting of Jonathan, Clark reached out to actor John Daniels, on the basis of Daniels' performance in the film The Candy Tangerine Man (1975). Actress Tanya Boyd was cast from an audition for the part of Brenda that impressed Clark. The film entered into production on a budget of $50,000. Because it was produced outside of the Screen Actors Guild, many cast members used pseudonyms. A day before filming was to begin, the original director of photography had an automobile accident. He assured Clark he would be able to make the film, but had to quit the production on the first day of filming because he was in too much pain, and was replaced by the film's gaffer, Dean Cundey. The staging and acting of the film's sex scenes has been compared to pornographic films, with the actors sometimes flubbing their lines and lines being delivered with hesitation.

== Release ==
Clark had recently founded his own distribution company to release films, but decided to screen Black Shampoo for Dimension Pictures, who made Clark a profitable offer, and the studio would end up distributing Black Shampoo worldwide. Blaxploitation films made up a significant part of the studio's output, with the studio's other releases including Boss Nigger (1975), Tough (1974) and Dr. Black, Mr. Hyde.

== Reception ==
In the 1996 book The Psychotronic Video Guide To Film, Michael Weldon described Black Shampoo as "Blaxploitation at its worst". Ian Jane, reviewing the film's DVD release for DVD Talk in 2005, opined that "while [Black Shampoo] takes a while to get going, the film has enough seventies swagger and enough action in the last half hour of the film to make this one well worth a look for those who enjoy the oddball factor that low budget blaxploitation movies were somehow able to deliver back in the decadent decade of disco." Dominic Griffin, reviewing the film for Spectrum Culture in 2017, described the movie as being "dull" until its "shockingly brutal" final 10 minutes, and opined that "there's nowhere near enough gun violence to fit the blaxploitation quota."
