= John Daniels (actor) =

American actor

- Born: Johnathan Daniels; 1945 (age 80–81); Gary, Indiana, U.S.
- Occupations: Actor; songwriter
- Years active: 1968–1982
- Known for: The Baron – The Candy Tangerine Man; Mr. Johnathan – Black Shampoo
- Spouse: Gwen Briscoe

Johnathan Daniels (born 1945), known professionally as John Daniels, is an American former actor. He is most notable for his role as 'The Baron' in the 1975 film The Candy Tangerine Man.

== Biography ==
Born and raised in Gary, Indiana, Daniels attended Butler University.

=== Club ownership ===
Maverick's Flat used to be an Arthur Murray dancing school. It was outfitted with fluffy sofas and glass tile table tops in a late 1960s style. In 1966 The Temptations were there for the opening and it is said that their hit "Psychedelic Shack" is about the club. Football player and actor Jim Brown helped Daniels both financial backing and promotion.

=== Music ===
Daniels and his wife, Gwen Brisco, managed a Disco Soul group called The Love Machine. Another group that he was connected with was one that he put together. This group DeBlanc featured Linda Carriere and Nidra Beard. As well as touring the United States, the group toured Japan, Europe and Canada. Eventually it broke up and with Beard and Carriere, it evolved into Starfire. Linda Carriere and Nidra Beard were later in the group Dynasty. Earlier in his career, Daniels had been a songwriter with Capitol records.

=== Credits ===
- Love Machine – The Love Machine – Philips – 63 70 725 – 1975 – (Executive Producer)
- The Love Machine – Feel The Love – Victor – VIP-6405 – 1977 – (Executive Producer and Arrangement)

=== Film roles ===
Daniels had the lead role in The Candy Tangerine Man (1975) where he played a pimp-by-night and family-man-by-day. In Black Shampoo (1976), Daniels played Jonathan, a heterosexual promiscuous male hairdresser. Director Greydon Clark was inspired by the 1975 film Shampoo, in what was observed to be a common blaxploitation filmmaking technique of intentionally piggybacking on previous hit films starring predominantly white casts to create African American films. Daniels also had a role as Black in Bare Knuckles (1977), an action film that starred Robert Viharo, Sherry Jackson and Gloria Hendry.

== Credits ==
Film

- 1981 Getting Over as Mike Barnett
- 1978 Mean Dog Blues as Yakima Jones
- 1977 Bare Knuckles as Black
- 1976 Black Shampoo as Mr. Jonathan
- 1975 The Candy Tangerine Man as The Baron / Ron Lewis
- 1974 Tender Loving Care as Jackie
- 1972 Hit Man as John
- 1969 After the Ball Was Over
