= Skip E. Lowe =

American actor (1929–2014)

- Born: Sammy Labella; June 6, 1929; Greenville, Mississippi, U.S.
- Died: September 22, 2014 (aged 85); Los Angeles, California, U.S.
- Other name: Gaylord Esterbrook
- Occupations: Talk show host, actor

Sammy Labella (June 6, 1929 – September 22, 2014), better known by his stage name Skip E. Lowe, was an American stand-up comedian, talk show host and actor.

== Live performance ==
Before adopting his now familiar stage name, LaBella worked as a stand-up comic, impressionist and master of ceremonies. In 1958, he performed in a number of Pittsburgh venues, most notably Lenny Litman's Copa, where he opened for Lambert, Hendricks and Ross and Dakota Staton. The following summer saw a number of engagements in New York State, and it was in July 1959 that LaBella made his first appearance as Skip E. Lowe at Glen Casino in Williamsville, New York.

== Film ==
He appeared in the films Black Shampoo (1976), The World's Greatest Lover (1977), Cameron's Closet (1988), and A-List (2006).

== Television ==
Beginning in 1978, he hosted Skip E. Lowe Looks at Hollywood, a weekly talk show for public-access cable television that aired in Los Angeles and New York City. It is estimated that Lowe conducted some 6,000 cable-television interviews from 1978 to 2014.

== Personal life ==
He was openly gay. In 2001, Lowe wrote The Boy with the Betty Grable Legs: A Showbiz Memoir. In 2014, he released another memoir, Hollywood Gomorrah.

== Death ==
Lowe died in Los Angeles, at age 85, on September 22, 2014, from emphysema.

According to his former website, Lowe was cremated and had his ashes scattered at Ventura Pier on November 23, 2014.

== Legacy ==
Martin Short cited him as the inspiration for his character Jiminy Glick.

== Filmography ==
Year	Title	Role	Notes
1943	Best Foot Forward	Cadet	uncredited
1944	Song of the Open Road	Minor Role	uncredited
1945	Hotel Berlin	Teenage Boy	uncredited
1947	Forever Amber	Young Man	uncredited
1975	Crazy Mama		uncredited
1976	Black Shampoo	Artie	
1976	Ilsa, Harem Keeper of the Oil Sheiks	Doctor	uncredited
1977	Bare Knuckles	Cedric	
1977	The World's Greatest Lover	First Wardrobe Man	
1979	Bitter Heritage		
1988	Cameron's Closet	Newscaster	
1989	Prime Suspect	Patient	
1994	Sunny Side Up	Himself	
2005	Murder on the Yellow Brick Road	Security Guard	
2006	A-List	Harry	
2006	Pittsburgh	Himself	
2006	Running Out of Time in Hollywood		
2014	The Final Song	Himself	

== See also ==
- List of people from Los Angeles
- List of people from Mississippi
- List of talk show hosts
