= Final Justice (1985 film) =

1984 film directed by Greydon Clark

- Video release poster
- Directed by: Greydon Clark
- Written by: Greydon Clark
- Produced by: Greydon Clark
- Starring: Joe Don Baker; Rossano Brazzi; Venantino Venantini; Patrizia Pellegrino; Bill McKinney; Helena Dalli; Lino Grech; Tony Ellul
- Cinematography: Nicholas Josef von Sternberg
- Edited by: Larry Bock
- Music by: David Bell
- Production company: Mediterranean Films
- Distributed by: Arista Films; Multicom Entertainment Group
- Release date: 1985 (United States)
- Running time: 90 minutes
- Countries: Italy; United States
- Language: English

Final Justice (also known as The Maltese Connection and The Maltese Project) is a 1985 Italian-American action film directed, produced and written by Greydon Clark, and stars Joe Don Baker as a Texas sheriff who causes chaos in Malta in order to find the mobster who killed his partner.

== Plot ==
Mafiosi Joseph Palermo (Venantino Venantini) and his brother Tony are fleeing across the border after assassinating a building contractor. They get into a car accident and, after killing the driver of the other car, they decide to hijack a car from a local police station. In the ensuing firefight, Palermo shoots and kills the sheriff (Greydon Clark). The gangsters are pursued across the border by the sheriff's deputy, a no-nonsense Apache-descendant named Thomas Jefferson Geronimo III (Baker). He shoots Tony dead and captures Joseph, who swears he will take revenge for his brother's death.

As a publicity stunt, a US State Department official named Wilson (Bill McKinney) orders Geronimo to escort Palermo to Italy. However, the plane is sabotaged and forced to land in Malta. Soon after arriving in Valletta, Geronimo is ambushed by gangsters and Palermo escapes his custody.

The Maltese police, under the command of Superintendent Mifsud (Lino Grech), assure Geronimo that they will recapture Palermo themselves. Chief Wilson telephones and orders Geronimo to return to Texas. But Geronimo is determined to capture Palermo himself. With the help of a local policewoman, Maria Cassar (Helena Dalli), he eventually tracks Palermo to the estate of Don Lamanna, a local bigwig. Geronimo is repeatedly arrested by the Maltese authorities, but always manages to escape and continue his pursuit of the gangster.

Eventually, it turns out that Palermo was in cahoots with Wilson, who had never intended for Geronimo to deliver Palermo to Italy. In the end, Cassar kills Wilson and Geronimo kills Palermo.

== Release ==
Final Justice was given a theatrical release in early 1985. It later received a home video release to VHS later that same year through Vestron Video. The movie was given a Blu-ray release in 2022 through MVD Entertainment Group.

=== Mystery Science Theater 3000 ===
In 1999, Final Justice was featured and lampooned in the eighth episode of Mystery Science Theater 3000's tenth season. It is the second film starring Baker to be riffed, following Mitchell, to which a few references were made.

=== RiffTrax ===
In 2017, RiffTrax released a video on demand of Final Justice with a new comedic commentary, distinct from the MST3K version. It is the fourth of Clark's films to receive the RiffTrax treatment, following Angels Revenge, Star Games and Uninvited.

== Reception ==
Upon its release David Pickering for Corpus Christi Times criticized the film's plot and its use of sex and violence. Kenneth Shorey of The Birmingham News praised the film's scenery, but noted that Final Justice was "the sort of movie in which even when people are talking outdoors it sounds as if they're talking indoors."

The Blu-ray release of the movie was reviewed by DVD Talk's Ian Jane, who wrote that it was "a ridiculously enjoyable B-movie thanks to Clark's crazy direction and Baker's bullish performance."
