= Lino Grech =

Maltese actor, writer and director (1930–2013)

- Born: Lino Grech; 1930; Sliema, Crown Colony of Malta
- Died: 2 December 2013 (aged 83); Msida, Malta
- Occupations: Actor, writer and director
- Years active: 1975–2013

Lino Grech (Sliema 1930 – Msida 2 December 2013) was a Maltese actor, writer and director for theater and television.

== F'Baħar Wieħed ==
Grech is best known for his role in the popular play F'Baħar Wieħed (In One Sea), which he initially wrote in 1975 for Rediffusion Malta as a radio serial and was later the first television series in Maltese to be broadcast on the national channel TVM. In the serie, he portrayed Pinu l-Pastizzar, together with Ġemma Portelli as his wife Ġoma.

The production received wide success thanks to the realistic portrayal of Maltese family life and the struggles of class.

== Television and theater ==
In the 1990s he wrote episodes for the well-known television series “Ipokriti”, “Simpatiċi”, “Il-Familja Grech” and “Issa Naraw”.

Grech was instrumental in the development of theater and television in Malta. As an actor, he played leading roles in the adaptations of works by, among others, Chekov, Lope de Vega and Arthur Miller.

Lino Grech also directed several plays at the De Porres Theatre in Sliema, the Catholic Institute and the Politeatru. He has also written a number of publications, including the first part of F'Baħar Wieħed, Il-Ġuri Tagħkom and the play L-Aħħar Logħba.

== Death ==
Lino Grech died on the night of December 1, 2013, aged 83, at the Mater Dei Hospital in Msida.

The Secretary for Culture and Local Government Josè Herrera remarked that "drama in our country has lost a pillar" and said that Grech was a person whose face will remain synonymous with many theatrical and audio-visual projects.

His funeral mass took place in his hometown of Sliema on December, 4th at the Sacro Cuor Church. He had a wife, Frances and three sons.

== Filmography ==
Year	Title	Role	Notes
1985	Final Justice	Supt. Mifsud	
1988	Black Eagle	Dock foreman	
