= The Return (1980 film) =

- Film poster
- Directed by: Greydon Clark
- Written by: Ken Wheat; Jim Wheat; Curtis Burch
- Produced by: Greydon Clark
- Starring: Jan-Michael Vincent; Cybill Shepherd; Martin Landau; Raymond Burr; Neville Brand; Vincent Schiavelli
- Cinematography: Daniel Pearl
- Edited by: Chris Burch
- Music by: Dan Wyman
- Distributed by: World Amusement Films
- Release date: 1980
- Running time: 94 minutes
- Country: United States
- Language: English
- Budget: $750,000

The Return is a 1980 American science-fiction film directed by Greydon Clark and starring Jan-Michael Vincent, Cybill Shepherd, Martin Landau and Raymond Burr. It met with little commercial success and was released directly to television and video.

== Plot ==
While stopping with her father at a gas station late one night in a small New Mexico town called Little Creek in 1955, a young girl wanders the empty main street of the town. She meets a local boy, and both are soon mesmerized by a column of light from above. The light disappears and the girl runs back to her father's car, and they soon leave.

Twenty-five years later, the town's deputy marshal Wayne is investigating a strange case of cattle mutilations with few leads to follow. His efforts are soon hampered by Jennifer, a scientist from California, who is overseeing a geology project in the area. As the two disagree over the mutilations and their possible causes, they find themselves attracted to one another in a seemingly familiar way as if they share some unknown bond. They discover that they were the children who had met in Little Creek. Wayne stayed and became a police officer while Jennifer returned to California and worked for her father's company. Jennifer claims that she has always felt a strange urge to return.

The mutilation case appears to be solved when the culprit is identified as a crazy old prospector hermit from the outskirts of town. He claims that he was visited by aliens 25 years ago and he has not aged a day since. Claiming to be on a mission from the aliens, the hermit says that the mutilations have a purpose: he has been using a "knife" made of energy to excise parts of the cattle and teleport them into space using a device hidden in the cave behind his cabin. While confronting him in the cave, Jennifer is subdued while the hermit explains that the aliens gave him a purpose that night. He then expresses jealousy that the aliens would also choose someone else and is shocked when an otherwise fatal blow from the alien "knife" fails to kill or even harm her. After she is saved by Wayne, it becomes apparent that it was all an experiment by the aliens.

== Cast ==
- Jan-Michael Vincent as Wayne
- Cybill Shepherd as Jennifer
- Martin Landau as Niles Buchanan
- Raymond Burr as Dr. Kramer
- Neville Brand as Walt
- Brad Rearden as Eddie
- Vincent Schiavelli as Prospector
- Darby Hinton as Darren
- Susan Kiger as Joyce
- Hilary Labow as Lee Ann
