= Wacko (film) =

- Theatrical release poster
- Directed by: Greydon Clark
- Written by: Jim Kouf; Dana Olsen; Michael Spound
- Produced by: Greydon Clark
- Starring: Joe Don Baker; Stella Stevens; Elizabeth Daily; George Kennedy; Julia Duffy; Andrew Dice Clay
- Cinematography: Nicholas Josef von Sternberg
- Edited by: Earl Watson
- Music by: Arthur Kempel
- Distributed by: Citadel Films (1982) (Canada); Jensen Farley Pictures (1983) (US; theatrical)
- Release date: November 12, 1982
- Running time: 90 minutes
- Country: United States
- Language: English

Wacko is a 1982 American comedy horror film produced and directed by Greydon Clark, starring Joe Don Baker and George Kennedy.

In the film, a police officer is obsessively investigating a cold case involving a spree killing on Halloween night. On the anniversary of the killing, the officer decides to dress up as the original killer and proceeds to become a copycat killer.

== Plot ==
Dick Harbinger is a police officer. Thirteen years ago, on Halloween, a man wearing a pumpkin head and driving a lawnmower murdered several children. Everyone is a suspect. The school janitor, Zeke, is brought in for questioning. The father of the family is also a suspect and is questioned by police. His daughter, Mary, has caught him on multiple occasions trying to peek at her either while in the shower or while she was asleep. Mary's friend Rosie is dating Tony "the Schlong" Schlongini. He, along with many others, was killed by Mr. Pumpkinhead.

In the end, the detective dresses up as the Lawnmower Killer because no one is taking the threat seriously. 13 years ago, Mary Graves' older sister was murdered on Halloween prom night by a power-mowing maniac. Since then, Mary has experienced horror, sexual frustration, and psychoanalysis, but she still sees little lawnmowers everywhere. After 13 years, the pumpkin-headed killer was planning to return. However, an obsessed cop tried to stop the plan.

At times, Harbinger's family all sit and eat cake at the dinner table. Baker also fills his suitcase (which has a tap on it) with coffee and later murders Vice Principal, Harry Vice. Harry likes to "clamp on down" on student slackers, but he ends up having his head clamped in a vice, courtesy of Harbinger.

== Cast ==
- Joe Don Baker as Dick Harbinger
- Stella Stevens as Mrs. Doctor Graves
- George Kennedy as Mr. Doctor Graves
- Julia Duffy as Mary Graves
- Scott McGinnis as Norman Bates
- Elizabeth Daily as Bambi
- Michele Tobin as Rosie
- Andrew Dice Clay as Tony Schlongini (credited as Andrew Clay)
- Anthony James as Zeke
- Sonny Carl Davis as The Weirdo (credited as Sonny Davis)
- David Drucker as The Looney
- Jeff Altman as Harry Palms
- Victor Brandt as Dr. Moreau
- Wil Albert as Dr. Denton
- Charles Napier as Chief O'Hara

== Release ==
The film was released theatrically in the United States by Jensen Farley Pictures in January 1983.

== Critical reception ==
Jeremy Wheeler of AllMovie gave the film one out of five stars, and wrote: "Wacko virtually vanished from the face of the earth, which, as it turns out, isn't necessarily a bad thing. For its hundreds of gags and zingers, there are actually very few laughs in a seemingly endless 84-minute running time." Chris Coffel of Bloody Disgusting praised the film's "frenetic energy" and "killer ensemble cast", writing: "Wacko is not a movie everyone is going to love or even like. Not all the jokes land, and depending on who you ask none of them do. But I can't help but love this movie."

== Home media ==
The film was released on VHS by Vestron Video, and was also released on Laserdisc.

In February 2019, a 4K remaster of the film was released on DVD and Blu-ray by Vinegar Syndrome.
