= Dan Wyman =

American musician, educator, and composer

Daniel Wyman is an American musician, educator, and composer for film & television. He is an Emeritus Professor at San Jose State University, and perhaps is best known for his collaborations with director John Carpenter on films such as Halloween and The Fog, where he worked as an orchestrator and synth programmer.

== Life and career ==
A native of Los Angeles, Wyman studied composition, music history, and film scoring at the University of Southern California. His principal instructors included Ingolf Dahl and David Raksin. After graduate studies and work with electronic music pioneer Paul Beaver, Wyman began composing for movies by joining producer-director John Carpenter to create the music for Assault on Precinct 13, The Fog, and Halloween. As a co-founder of the recording studio, Sound Arts, Wyman contributed to numerous soundtracks as electronic orchestrator and sound designer, including Apocalypse Now, Fade to Black, and the stage musical Baby. He has composed music for the Ice Capades, commercials, and contributed to numerous hit recordings by Earth, Wind & Fire, Donna Summer, Barbra Streisand, Black Sabbath, Devo, and many others.

Currently holding a doctorate in composition and ethnomusicology from the University of Natal in Durban, South Africa, Wyman teaches film scoring at San Jose State University. Since 1988, Wyman and his wife have pursued studies and projects focusing on the arts in South Africa. They have worked with the University of Natal, and the University of Durban-Westville.

== Personal life ==
Wyman's wife Marilyn is an art history professor and lecturer at San Jose State University. She has published numerous papers, and works extensively in South Africa.

== Filmography ==
=== As Composer ===
- Without Warning (1980)
- The Return (1980)
- Hell Night (1981)
- Darkroom (1981) - 2 episodes
- Missing (1982) - Additional music; uncredited
- The Dead Pit (1989)
- The Lawnmower Man (1992)

=== As Other ===
- Assault on Precinct 13 (1976) - Orchestrator
- Metamorphoses (1978) - Special sound effects
- Halloween (1978) - Orchestrator
- Apocalypse Now (1979) - Score supervisor
- The Fog (1980) - Orchestrator
