= Satan's Cheerleaders =

1977 film by Greydon Clark

- Directed by: Greydon Clark
- Written by: Greydon Clark; Alvin L. Fast
- Produced by: Alvin L. Fast
- Starring: John Ireland; Yvonne De Carlo; John Carradine
- Cinematography: Dean Cundey
- Edited by: World Amusement Company
- Music by: Gerald Lee
- Distributed by: Dimension Pictures
- Release date: March 18, 1977
- Running time: 90 minutes
- Country: United States
- Language: English
- Budget: $75,000

Satan's Cheerleaders is a 1977 American comedy horror film directed by Greydon Clark and starring John Ireland, Yvonne De Carlo, and John Carradine.

== Plot ==
The cheerleading team of Benedict High School are a rowdy group of girls who are more than happy to partake in partying and have dalliances with the football team. They're also an object of lust for the school's janitor Billy, who is secretly a member of a Satanic cult. On the evening of the first big football game of the season, Billy uses his powers to strand the cheerleaders and their coach, Ms. Johnson, in the middle of nowhere. He convinces them to let him take them to the game, only for him to instead take them to a Satanic altar for sacrifice where they all enter into a trance. One of their number, Patti, strips and climbs onto the altar, where she has sex with an unseen Satan. Billy tries to rape her but is unable to approach her. He persists and is killed by the unseen power, after which the trance is broken. Now panicked at the sight of a dead body, the team heads to a nearby town to inform the Sheriff of Billy's death.

In the town the girls and their coach discover that it is inhabited by a Satanic cult intent on making one of them the virgin bride of Satan and sacrificing the rest. Patti begins acting strangely, prompting the cult's High Priestess to correctly assume that Patti has Satanic powers. The girls are imprisoned but manage to escape captivity, however Ms. Johnson is caught in the process and raped by the Sheriff. The cheerleaders eventually make their way back to the altar, where they are recaptured. The Sheriff then starts sorting through the cheerleaders for a virgin, only to realize that all are sexually active. Patti coldly reveals that Ms. Johnson had been the promised virgin and that Satan was angry that the Sheriff ruined the ceremony with his desires. She then uses her demonic powers to eliminate the cult. The cheerleaders and Ms. Johnson leave the town and join the football team at the game, where Patti uses her powers to ensure that their team wins.

== Cast ==
- John Ireland as The Sheriff
- Yvonne De Carlo as Emmy / Sheriff's Wife / High Priestess
- Jack Kruschen as Billy the Janitor
- John Carradine as The Bum
- Sydney Chaplin as Monk
- Jacqulin Cole as Ms. Johnson
- Kerry Sherman as Patti
- Hillary Horan as Chris
- Alisa Powell as Debbie
- Sherry Marks as Sharon
- Lane Cordell as Stevie
- Joseph Carlo as Coach
- Michael Donavan O'Donnell as Farmer
- Robin Greer as Baker Girl

== Development ==
Filming for Satan's Cheerleaders took place during a two week period and had a budget of $75,000. The film's music was created by Gerald Lee, whose band Sonoma performed songs for the soundtrack.

== Release ==
The film was given a test screening by Dimension Pictures in Jacksonville and Miami, Florida on March 18, 1977, which was followed by a wider release. Satan's Cheerleaders was originally given a PG rating that was changed to R after a film re-edit.

=== Home media ===
The film was released on VHS in the 1980s by various companies including Interglobal Home Video, Liberty Home Video, and United Video and on DVD by VCI Entertainment in 2002. The DVD version was released by the VCI Home Video label from Music Video Distributors. A Blu-ray and DVD combo was released on November 7, 2017.

== Reception ==
TV Guide found that "This is a wretched drive-in movie that doesn't even live up to the potential for unintentional laughs promised by the title." Linda Gross of The Los Angeles Times wrote that the film "has its moments" and that "Fantasy scenes are more credible than those of everyday life, which seem forced." SyFy's Sara Century noted that the film "isn't going to be for everyone" and that "Managing to somehow combine a series of exploitative stereotypes with the heroic turn of a hyper-intelligent teen girl, Satan’s Cheerleaders is a paradox — but it's still a bizarrely entertaining one, and Patti remains one of the great characters of ‘70s sexploitation cinema."

The film received reviews from DVD Talk's G. Noel Gross and Bill Gibron, both of whom recommended the movie.
