= Ellen Prince (costume designer) =

American actress and costume designer

Ellen Prince is a Hollywood actress and costume designer. She contributed screenwriting and voiced the character of the puppet boy in the 1969 Czech version of Pinocchio (1969). She did set decoration for Lemora: A Child's Tale of the Supernatural (1973). She designed the costumes on the films Where the Wild Fern Grows (1974), costumes and makeup for Miss Melody Jones (1974), and was the art director for Tender Loving Care (1975).

== Filmography ==
- Tender Loving Care (1973) (Art Director/Actress)
- Pinocchio and His Magic Show (1976) (Pinocchio, voice)
