= Russian Holiday =

- Directed by: Greydon Clark
- Starring: Susan Blakely, Barry Bostwick
- Release date: 1992
- Running time: 89 mins.
- Country: United States
- Language: English

Russian Holiday (also known as Russian Roulette) is a 1992/1993 film directed by Greydon Clark and starring Susan Blakely and Barry Bostwick.

== Plot ==
Susan, an American teacher is on a tour holiday in Saint Petersburg. She gets romantically involved with Grant, a fellow countryman. As she tries to smuggle a medallion out of Russia, she is soon the witness of various murders.

== Cast ==
- Jeff Altman as Milt Holly
- Victoria Barrett as Viktoria
- Susan Blakely as Susan Dennison
- Barry Bostwick as Grant Ames
- E.G. Marshall as Joe Meadows

== Production ==
The film was shot on location in Russia.

The soundtrack was composed by Dan Slider, and as the Los Angeles Times reports, "Whoever got the job would have to conduct the 70-piece Kirov Ballet Orchestra, and director Greydon Clark needed to be convinced that Slider wouldn't choke."

== Reception ==
Although Clark claims that various spectators found the film "Hitchcockian", the German website TV Today commented" "Another "crime film the world doesn't need." The original locations where the film was shot also don't provide enough of a kick to keep you captivated in the long run.", while Leonard Maltin wrote, " One-note thriller (that) is barely entertaining, despite its use of authentic locations."

The film was described as being "a daft espionnage trhriller" and having a "routine story".
