= Hi-Riders =

1978 film by Greydon Clark

- Film poster
- Directed by: Greydon Clark
- Written by: Greydon Clark
- Produced by: Mike MacFarland
- Starring: Wm. J. Beaudine; Mel Ferrer; Stephen McNally; Darby Hinton; Ralph Meeker; Neville Brand
- Cinematography: Dean Cundey
- Edited by: Earl Watson
- Music by: Gerald Lee
- Distributed by: Dimension Pictures
- Release date: 1978
- Running time: 90 min.
- Country: United States
- Language: English

Hi-Riders is a 1978 action film written and directed by Greydon Clark.

== Plot ==
Mark and Lynn are drawn into acts of hatred and revenge after trying to collect on a bet with a drag-racing car club known for "jacking up" the rears of their cars much higher than stock. When a local hothead challenges the club to a race, both drivers are killed in a spectacular explosion. The local boy's father vows revenge.

== Release ==
The film was released theatrically in the United States by Dimension Pictures in 1978.

The film was released on a double feature DVD with Clark's The Bad Bunch by VCI Home Entertainment in 2010.
