= Dance Macabre (film) =

- Directed by: Greydon Clark
- Written by: Greydon Clark
- Produced by: Menahem Golan
- Starring: Robert Englund; Michelle Zeitlin; Marianna Moen; Julene Renee
- Cinematography: Nicholas Josef von Sternberg
- Edited by: Earl Watson
- Production company: Lenfilm Studio
- Distributed by: 21st Century Film Corporation
- Release date: September 16, 1992
- Running time: 98 minutes
- Countries: United States; Russia
- Language: English

Dance Macabre is a 1992 American slasher film written and directed by Greydon Clark, and starring Robert Englund, Michelle Zeitlin, Irina Davidoff, and Alexander Sergeyev. It follows an American dancer at an academy in Saint Petersburg, where a series of murders and disappearances begin taking place.

== Plot ==
At a secluded dance academy near Saint Petersburg, Madame Gordenko, a stern woman who uses a wheelchair, welcomes a new group of students alongside Anthony, an American dance instructor, and Olga, another teacher. Among the new arrivals is Jessica Anderson, a young American dancer who captures Anthony's attention due to her uncanny resemblance to his late lover, Svetlana—a Russian ballerina who died in a motorcycle accident in New York.

Jessica struggles in her first ballet class. Her roommate, Claudine, offers to help her practice, but after a quick trip to the spa, Claudine mysteriously disappears. Alone in the studio, Jessica dances in her own energetic, rock-infused style. Later, she meets Alex, a photographer secretly sneaking into the academy to photograph Anthony and Gordenko. The two share a spark, and Jessica joins him for a ride on his motorbike. The next day, Olga informs her that Claudine left the academy, though Jessica is unconvinced.

During a subsequent lesson, Gordenko pairs Jessica with a dancer named Angela. Though Jessica still struggles with traditional ballet, Gordenko sees potential in her. Later, Jessica finds another student, Ingrid, dancing alone in the attic. Ingrid reveals she struggles with addiction. Anthony offers Jessica a private lesson to help her improve, which she accepts.

At a recital featuring male dancers, Angela causes a disruption and is sent offstage by Olga. While alone, Angela is murdered—hanged from a rafter by an unseen assailant. Jessica begins to sense something is wrong. Gordenko hints at Angela's possible disappearance, but Ingrid assures everyone that she's fine. The next night, Anthony and Olga take the girls out to a nightclub. Jessica meets Alex again, and they share a kiss, which Anthony sees, clearly affected.

Meanwhile, Natasha, another student, walks her boyfriend Ivan to the station. After his train departs, the mysterious killer pushes her onto the tracks. That night, Anthony sees Alex sneaking into Jessica's room. Jessica and Alex sleep together.

The following morning, Anthony announces Natasha's death. Later, Ingrid returns to the attic but is killed by the attacker—revealed to be Gordenko herself. With several students now missing or dead, most of the academy clears out. Anthony insists Jessica is the academy's last real talent and urges Olga to prepare her for an upcoming audition.

Jessica follows Alex to Anthony's quarters, where she and Olga discover the bodies of Claudine and Angela hidden in a cupboard. Gordenko appears, fatally stabbing Alex. During the struggle, Olga accidentally stabs herself just as Anthony enters. She dies in his arms, whispering, "Our secret is safe."

With everyone else gone, Jessica remains, encouraged by Anthony. He begins training her for the audition, even dressing her in a wig to resemble Svetlana. On the eve of the performance, Jessica visits Gordenko, who suddenly attacks her. Gordenko speaks in Anthony's voice, revealing that she and Anthony are the same person—Anthony has developed a split personality, becoming Gordenko to keep Svetlana's memory alive. He tries to drug Jessica, believing she is Svetlana, and she blacks out.

Jessica wakes up in her room, a bouquet of roses beside her signed "Svetlana." Anthony arrives with a gun, forcing her to perform at the audition. She begins by following his choreography but abruptly stops, rips off the wig, and declares she is not Svetlana. She then dances in her own style, stunning the judges.

Gordenko's persona resurfaces and attempts to shoot Jessica from the balcony. In a final moment of clarity, Anthony overcomes the persona and throws himself from the balcony to save her. Jessica rushes to his side. As he dies, he whispers, "You danced for me."

== Cast ==
- Robert Englund as Anthony Wagner / Madame Gordenko
- Michelle Zeitlin as Svetlana / Jessica Anderson
- Irina Davidoff as Olga
- Alexander Sergeyev as Alex
- Nina Goldman as Claudine
- Julene Renee as Angela
- Marianna Moen as Ingrid
- Natasha Fesson as Natasha
- Vadim Zajtsev as Ivan

== Production ==
The film was originally developed as a sequel to the earlier 21st Century Englund-starring vehicle The Phantom of the Opera, under the title Terror of Manhattan

== Release ==
The film was released direct-to-video in the United States by Columbia TriStar Home Video on September 16, 1992. It had previously been released in Germany in May of that year.

It was misleadingly labeled in Japan as being a sequel to the 1989 movie adaptation of The Phantom of the Opera (also starring Robert Englund).

=== Home media ===
Following its original VHS release in 1992, Dance Macabre was given a DVD release in 2015 through MGM Home Entertainment's "Limited Edition Collection" line. Scream Factory released the film on Blu-ray in 2017.

== Sources ==
- Mann, Dave (2014). Harry Alan Towers: The Transnational Career of a Cinematic Contrarian. Jefferson, North Carolina: McFarland. ISBN 978-0-7864-7982-5.
