= Uninvited (1987 film) =

1988 film by Greydon Clark

- Promotional release poster
- Directed by: Greydon Clark
- Written by: Greydon Clark
- Produced by: Greydon Clark
- Starring: George Kennedy; Alex Cord; Clu Gulager; Toni Hudson; Eric Larson
- Cinematography: Nicholas von Sternberg
- Edited by: Travis Clark; Tom Gunn
- Music by: Dan Slider
- Production company: Heritage Entertainment
- Distributed by: New Star Video
- Release date: 1987
- Running time: 92 minutes
- Country: United States
- Language: English
- Budget: $200,000

Uninvited is a 1987 American science-fiction horror film written, produced and directed by Greydon Clark and starring George Kennedy, Alex Cord, Clu Gulager, Toni Hudson and Eric Larson. The film primarily takes place aboard a luxury yacht owned by a criminal multimillionaire and bound for the Cayman Islands, whose passengers and crew are terrorized by a mutant cat.

== Plot ==
At a genetic research facility, a genetically altered mutant cat is placed inside a house cat. The house cat escapes captivity, and kills several people in the building before escaping through an air duct. The next day, it jumps on a truck driven by two men, and kills them both by attacking them, causing them to crash the car. Meanwhile, multimillionaire "Wall Street" Walter Graham, and his associate Mike Harvey are preparing to take a luxury yacht to the Cayman Islands to evade criminal prosecution. Accompanying them are Rachel, the boat's captain who is working her way to buy the boat back from Walter; Albert, Walter's friend; and Suzanne and Bobbi, two spring breakers invited to come along.

Before the trip starts, Suzanne and Bobbi meet three boys, Martin, Corey, and Lance at the marina, and invite them to come along. Walter reluctantly agrees, but only under the condition that they work as the boat's crew as the other crew had previously quit. The cat finds its way to Suzanne, who also brings it along, only after Walter playfully and rather ironically protests that the cat is not invited. After the ship sets sail, the passengers have a party, although a drunken Albert is killed alone on the deck by the cat, and falls into the water. The others find some of Albert's blood the next day and dismiss his death as accidental. Martin, ever the inquisitive and enterprising biologist, nevertheless inspects the blood sample using a sextant in lieu of a microscope and observes that Albert's blood cell count was abnormally high.

Walter later attempts to rape Bobbi and Lance tries to stop him, but Mike intervenes and shoots Lance in the shoulder before the cat—incensed by the frenzy of violence—bites into his Achilles tendon. Mike is critically wounded by the bite, and Martin deduces that the cat's bites are venomous. Rachel and Suzanne attempt to call for help, although Walter destroys any means of communication, intent on reaching the Cayman Islands. Mike soon begins having horrible spasms, and eventually dies; the survivors throw his body overboard. The next day, while Lance and Bobbi are engaged in precoital foreplay, the cat bites off a couple of Lance's fingers. Resigned to his fate, Lance commits suicide by jumping off the ship. Bobbi pleads for him not to, and they both fall over and drown. Corey places several pieces of food in the engine room to lure out the cat, but when he tries to shoot it, he causes a steam blast that kills him.

The cat gets into the yacht's food and infects it, resulting in Rachel and Martin locking the food up. Suzanne believes they are hiding it for themselves and eats a few bites of bread, only for the poison to cause a few of her neck veins to pop, killing her. A storm arrives, and the yacht begins sinking, resulting in Walter, Rachel, and Martin evacuating on one of the lifeboats. Walter throws two briefcases of money into the lifeboat, and goes to retrieve the third, but is killed by the cat. Rachel and Martin escape in the lifeboat, but the cat follows and attacks them. They dump money from one of the briefcases into a duffel bag before knocking the cat overboard, watching it grab onto the briefcase, and slowly float away. The two reach the Cayman Islands sometime later, living off the two remaining briefcases of money.

Meanwhile, the cat washes up on a beach somewhere, and a little boy picks it up, unaware of the danger.

== Cast ==
- George Kennedy as Mike Harvey
- Alex Cord as Walter Graham
- Clu Gulager as Albert
- Toni Hudson as Rachel
- Eric Larson as Martin
- Clare Carey as Bobbie
- Beau Dremann as Lance
- Rob Estes as Corey
- Shari Shattuck as Suzanne
- Michael Holden as Daryl Perkins
- Austin Stoker as Caribbean Officer
- Cecile Callan as Girl In Pizza Parlor
- Jack Heller as Hotel Concierge
- Gina Schinasi as The Bartender
- Ron Presson as Man At Gas Station

== Critical reception ==
=== Contemporary ===
A reviewer writing for The Missoulian gave the film a score of zero stars, calling it an "unbelievably awful horror entry. Even the special effects are third-rate — the mutant creature looks like a carpet remnant with fangs." In a review of Greydon Clark's 1989 film Skinheads, Joe Kane of the New York Daily News wrote that Skinheads "fails to equal the zesty awfulness of [Clark's] last outing, the memorable atomic-mutant-cat clinker Uninvited."

=== Retrospective ===
In his 2003 book The Gorehound's Guide to Splatter Films of the 1980s, Scott Aaron Stine called the film "ludicrously silly", and wrote that it "suffers from abysmal continuity [...], an awful hand puppet-style critter, shoddy gore and abused bladder effects, model in a bathtub miniatures, and the worst overdubbing of cat noises to grace a bad horror film." Author Steven Puchalski called the film an "idiotic romp" and referred to it as "mindless crapola for low IQ-ed animal lovers".

In 2009, Kurt Dahlke of DVD Talk wrote that Uninvited is "so monumentally off its nut that it's quite enjoyable", but lamented the "sheer ridiculousness" of the cat as having contributed to a perceived lack of tension in the film's narrative. In 2013, Todd Martin of HorrorNews.net gave the film a positive review, praising the originality of its premise and writing: "I love Uninvited and think that it is just a fun little movie. I know that a lot of people think that it is terrible and if you look up other reviews for it online they are less than positive, but I have to disagree."

In 2019, Brian Orndorf of Blu-ray.com referred to the first half of Uninvited as being superior to its second half. He noted the film's use of "B-movie cliches" and "characters addicted to bad decisions", and wrote that the "limited pleasures of Uninvited are primarily contained to monster matters, and while the cat effect isn't great, the creature's rampage is the best thing about [the film]".

== Home media ==
Uninvited was released on VHS by New Star Video. In Norway, it was released in Norwegian on VHS under the title Killer Cat. The film also received a LaserDisc release by Image Entertainment.

In 2009, Uninvited was released on DVD by Liberation Entertainment as a double feature with the 1984 film Mutant.

On January 29, 2019, Uninvited was remastered in 4K and released on DVD and Blu-ray by Vinegar Syndrome. The release includes a previously unreleased international cut of the film which features alternate footage, including a different ending.

A spoof version of the film, with a humorous audio commentary synced to the action, was created by RiffTrax and released on June 8, 2017.

== See also ==
- The Thing (1982) - similar in content
- Mystery Science Theater 3000
