= Jeff Altman =

American stand-up comedian and actor (born 1951)

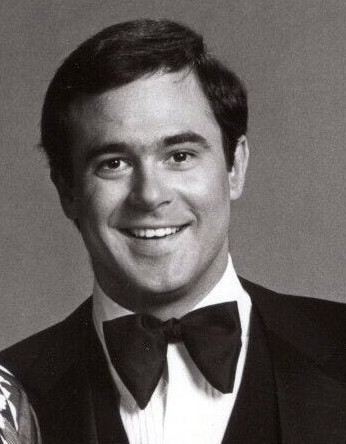
- Altman in 1980
- Born: August 13, 1951 (age 75); Syracuse, New York, U.S.
- Occupations: Stand-up comedian, actor
- Years active: 1974–present
- Spouses: Leslie Ackerman (m. 1979, divorced): Bonnie Goldstein (m. 19??)
- Children: 2 (1 stepdaughter)

Jeff Altman (born August 13, 1951) is an American stand-up comedian and actor who has appeared as a guest on Late Night with David Letterman and Late Show with David Letterman a combined 45 times. Altman mesmerized contemporaries like David Letterman and Jerry Seinfeld, and inspired future comedians like Judd Apatow.

Altman has also had numerous acting roles in movies and television such as Dr. Gene Splicer in Tiny Toon Adventures, Professor Dweeb in Slimer! And the Real Ghostbusters, Clint Mullet on Mork and Mindy, and five different guest characters on Baywatch. He had a recurring role as Hughie Hogg, the nephew of Jefferson Davis Hogg, on The Dukes of Hazzard.

== Early life and education ==
Altman was born in Syracuse, New York, to Genelle, a housewife, and Arthur, a sales manager. At Nottingham Senior High School in Syracuse, he played third singles on the school's tennis team and was on the wrestling team. He graduated from Johns Hopkins University in 1974 with a degree in social sciences.

== Career ==
Altman began his career in 1974 at the Comedy Store.

In 1976, came his first appearance on television, on Cos, a Bill Cosby children's variety show . A year later he joined Starland Vocal Band Show, where he was alongside celebrities such as David Letterman and Mark Russell. In 1978 he appeared as sleazy record promoter Lennie Richfield in the movie American Hot Wax. Altman also had a starring role as the host of the short-lived NBC variety show Pink Lady and Jeff in 1980, which TV Guide has ranked No. 35 on its "50 Worst TV Shows of All Time" list. Altman appeared on the first episode of An Evening at the Improv.

Later in the decade, he became the in-house comedian on Solid Gold, where his characters included Al Punker, fast-talking proprietor of "Al Punker's Music Barn," the "music vampire Count Downula," and the ex-boxer Leonard Moon, the last of whom would state "I don't have the brains of a ice cube" and claim, "I am the Solid Gold music critic. Tonight, my subject is music."

Altman has directed many sitcoms. In the mid-1980s, he was the spokesman for Arby's restaurants, Tostitos corn chips, and Valvoline motor oil, and by 1990 he was a Budweiser spokesman.

In 1989, Altman released his one and only comedy record album, titled "I'll Flip You Like A Cheese Omelette" (Mercury 842 070–1) and the same year had appeared in three Hollywood clubs: the Laugh Factory, the Comedy Store and the Irvine Improvisation. He also has been the (uncredited) host of the defensive driving course available through Blockbuster Video.

In the 1990s, Altman was on the NBC series Nurses during its first season (1991–1992). He was written out as the show was re-worked for its second season.

A regular feature of his stand-up act has typically included a comical impression of his father, and Altman continued to find his Nixon impression humorous well into the 1980s. In 1991 he was a host of The Sunday Comics, but later was replaced by Lenny Clarke. On February 22, 1991, Altman had created his own show called Jeff Altman's Scrap Book, where he continued to parody his "Dad" as Uncle Carl which he started back in early 1980s.

In 2017, Jeff Altman played a fundraiser, at the Chicago branch of the Laugh Factory, for McCormac College of Lake View, Chicago.

=== Altman and Letterman ===
Altman met Letterman in 1975 at the Comedy Store in Hollywood. After a few dinners and even attending Indianapolis 500 together, they became great friends. During one such outing, a woman, who was a huge Letterman fan, had approached them and asked if Altman could take a picture of her and Letterman, using her camera. As they posed and Altman was lining up the shot, he suddenly broke away and ran, pretending to steal the camera. Since that time, Jeff Altman appeared on Late Night with David Letterman and Late Show with David Letterman a combined 45 times.

== Personal life ==
Altman is a drummer, and a longtime fan of Buddy Rich, whom he once enticed to appear at Hopkins for one of his classes. In 1979 he married Leslie Ackerman and together they had a daughter, Faith.

Altman is also an accomplished magician. A much admired "card man," one of his effects has been included in the famous Tarbell Course in Magic.

== Filmography ==
=== Film ===
Year	Title	Role	Notes
1977	Record City	Engineer	
1978	American Hot Wax	Lennie Richfield	
1982	Wacko	Harry Palms	
1983	Easy Money	Bill Jones	
1985	Doin' Time	Juke Jarrett	
1986	Soul Man	Ray McGrady	
1991	Highlander II: The Quickening	Doctor	
1993	Russian Holiday	Milt Holly	
1994	Chantmania: The Benzedrine Monks of Santo Damonica	Don Keydick	
2001	Holiday in the Sun	Chad	
2004	Back by Midnight	Doctor	
2006	Cloud 9	Drunk lawyer	
2007	Bee Movie	Uncle Carl	Voice
2007	Urban Decay	Man in dumpster	

=== Television ===
Year	Title	Role	Notes
1976	Mary Hartman, Mary Hartman	Johnny Tilson	2 episodes
1977	All's Fair	President Carter	2 episodes
1977	Eight is Enough	Reverend Corbett	Episode: “Children of the Groom”
1978	The Young Pioneers	Dr. Hayes	Episode: "The Promise of Spring"
1978	Maude	President Carter	Episode: "Maude's Big Move: Part 3"
1978	Mork & Mindy	Clint Mullet	Episode: "Mork Goes Public"
1979	Amateur Night at the Dixie Bar and Grill	Marvin Laurie	Television film
1979	Legends of the Superheroes	Weather Wizard	2 episodes
1979	WKRP in Cincinnati	Murray Gressler	Episode: "Johnny Comes Back"
1979–1985	The Dukes of Hazzard	Hughie Hogg	6 episodes
1980	Pink Lady	Various roles	Episode #1.6
1981	Archie Bunker's Place	Gary Bernstein	2 episodes
1981	Bulba	Gary Holmes	Television film
1982	Scared Silly	Donovan Scott	Television film
1982	Drop-Out Father	Harry	Television film
1982	In Love with an Older Woman	Gordon	Television film
1984	Scene of the Crime	Jack Morton	Episode: "A Very Practical Joke"
1986	It's a Living	Brian Jackson	Episode: "American Sweetheart"
1986	Night Court	Judge Mike Watson	Episode: "The New Judge"
1987	Stingray	Jeff	Episode: "The First Time Is Forever"
1988–1989	The Real Ghostbusters	Professor Norman Dweeb	Voice; 11 episodes
1989	Thirtysomething	Monty Ovary	Episode: "Trust Me"
1989	Little White Lies	Technician	Television film
1989–1998	Baywatch	Various roles	7 episodes
1990	Tiny Toon Adventures	Lloyd / Dr. Gene Splicer	Voice; 2 episodes
1991–1992	Nurses	Greg Vincent	22 episodes
1994	Thunder in Paradise	George Langston Sibley VI	Episode: "Gettysburg Change of Address"
1996	Caroline in the City	Howie Bloom	Episode: "Caroline and the Movie"
1996	Land's End	Lou	Episode: "Who's Killing Cole Porter?"
2008–2010	Late Show with David Letterman	Various roles	30 episodes
