= Doin' Time (film) =

- Theatrical release poster
- Directed by: George Mendeluk
- Screenplay by: Franelle Silver; Ron Zwang; Dee Caruso
- Story by: Franelle Silver; Ron Zwang; George Mendeluk; Dee Caruso; Peter Wilson
- Produced by: Bruce Mallen; George Mendeluk
- Starring: Jeff Altman; Dey Young; Richard Mulligan; John Vernon; Jimmie Walker; Judy Landers
- Cinematography: Ronald Víctor García
- Edited by: Stanford C. Allen; Hubert de La Bouillerie
- Music by: Charles Fox
- Production companies: Filmcorp; The Ladd Company
- Distributed by: Warner Bros.
- Release date: May 19, 1985
- Running time: 81 minutes
- Country: United States
- Language: English

Doin' Time is a 1985 American comedy film directed by George Mendeluk and written by Franelle Silver, Ron Zwang and Dee Caruso. The film stars Jeff Altman, Dey Young, Richard Mulligan, John Vernon, Jimmie Walker, and Judy Landers. The film was released by Warner Bros. on May 19, 1985.

== Plot ==
The warden of John Dillinger Memorial Penitentiary begins a series of prison reforms that cut down on the fun and games that the prisoners had been enjoying and eventually the convicts decide a little revenge is in order.

== Cast ==
- Jeff Altman as Duke Jarrett
- Richard Mulligan as Mongo Mitchell
- Muhammad Ali as himself
- Henry Bal as Guard Kowinski
- Gene Bell as Vaudevillan
- Big Yank as Bubba Feldstein
- Simmy Bow as "Snake Eyes"
- Drew Bundini Brown as himself
- David Lee Bynum as Prisoner
- Colleen Camp as Nancy Catlett
- Max Carl as Vocalist
- Melanie Chartoff as Linda Libel
- Robert Clotworthy as Attorney
- Dee Cooper as Truck Driver
- Ji-Tu Cumbuka as Bernie Feldstein
- Robert Czakel as Duke's Trainer
- Eugene Davis Jr. as Prisoner
- Dora Denney as Martha
- Melinda O. Fee as Denise
- Gayle Fox as Bambi
- Irma García as Maid
- Stuart Gillard as Senator Hodgkins
- Graham Jarvis as Prescott
- Dulcie Jordan as Female Inspector
- Judy Landers as The Bride
- Lex Landi as Krat Producer
- Lee Robert Laningham as Prisoner
- Julius LeFlore as Murray
- Frank Lugo as Guard Garcia
- Mike Mazurki as Bruno
- Pat McCormick as Fallis
- Travis McKenna as "Slob"
- Charlie Messenger as Referee
- Kitten Natividad as Tassie
- Joe Nipote as Angelo Chrispini
- Ron Palillo as Pappion
- John Reilly as The Governor
- Don Richey as William Gibbons
- Dennis Robertson as Father O'Brien
- Rhonda Shear as Adrianne
- Dona Speir as Card Holder
- Paul Stader as Old Man
- Duke Stroud as George
- Jaynie Sustar as Monique
- Eddie Velez as "Wetback"
- John Vernon as Mac "Big Mac"
- Jimmie Walker as Shaker
- James Welch as Billy Cox
- Pete Willcox as Melvin
- Nicholas Worth as "Animal"
- Dey Young as Vicki Norris, Prison Psychiatrist / Dr. Walker
- Joel Zurlo as Unit Manager
- Ron Zwang as Arthur
