= Without Warning (1980 film) =

1980 film by Greydon Clark

- Theatrical release poster
- Directed by: Greydon Clark
- Written by: Daniel Grodnik; Lyn Freeman; Bennett Tramer; Steve Mathis
- Produced by: Greydon Clark
- Starring: Jack Palance; Martin Landau; Tarah Nutter; Christopher S. Nelson
- Cinematography: Dean Cundey
- Edited by: Curtis Burch
- Music by: Dan Wyman
- Production companies: Filmways Pictures; Heritage Enterprises
- Distributed by: Filmways Pictures
- Release date: September 19, 1980
- Running time: 89 minutes
- Country: United States
- Language: English
- Budget: $150,000

Without Warning (also known as It Came Without Warning) is a 1980 American science fiction horror film directed and produced by Greydon Clark and starring Jack Palance, Martin Landau, Tarah Nutter, Christopher S. Nelson, Kevin Peter Hall, Neville Brand, and Ralph Meeker in his final film role. It centers on an alien lifeform that arrives on Earth in order to stalk and kill humans as game. It was released by Filmways Pictures on September 19, 1980.

The film has been acknowledged as an influence on the 1987 film Predator and its sequels. Both films feature Kevin Peter Hall as a costumed manhunter of alien origin.

== Plot ==
A father and son go hunting in the mountains. Before they can begin hunting, which the son does not want to do anyway, they are killed by flying jellyfish-like creatures, which penetrate their skin with needle-tipped tentacles.

Some time later, four teenagers, Tom, Greg, Beth and Sandy, hike in the same area, ignoring the warnings of local truck stop owner Joe Taylor. A group of Cub Scouts is also in the area; their leader is also killed by the alien creatures, while his troop runs into an unidentified humanoid and flee.

The teenagers set up camp at a lake, but after a few hours, Tom and Beth disappear. Sandy and Greg go looking for them and discover their bodies in an abandoned shack. They drive away in their van, while being attacked by one of the jellyfish which tries to get through the car's windshield. After they get rid of it, they arrive at the truck stop. Greg tries to get help from the locals in a bar, but they do not believe him, except for Fred "Sarge" Dobbs, who is a mentally ill veteran. Meanwhile, Sandy, waiting in the van outside, encounters the humanoid and flees into the woods. The bar owner and Sarge stop Greg running into the woods to look for her in the dark, and the bar owner calls the police; she says he might be a while, as he's looking for a pack of lost Boy Scouts. Joe Taylor finds Sandy and takes her to the bar.

While they discuss the situation, they lose power and the lights go off. The sheriff arrives, but since they have just postulated that the alien could disguise itself as human, Sarge shoots at what he thinks is an invader, only to realise the truth a few seconds too late; his shock at what he has done first horrifies him, then his mental illness causes him to start blaming Greg. While the locals telephone for an ambulance, Greg and Sandy leave with Taylor, who says they need proof to convince the authorities to act, as everyone already thinks that the only other person who believes in the creatures, Sarge, is crazy. He also reveals he has been attacked by the humanoid before and secretly keeps the flying jellyfish as trophies. They search for the shack and once there, Taylor goes inside and finds the bodies of Tom, Beth, the father and son, and the cub scout leader. They discuss waiting for the creature when Taylor is attacked by another "jellyfish." The young people run once again, leaving him behind as ordered. They stop a police car and get into the back seat, but find Sarge driving. He abducts them, believing them to be aliens. Greg plays along, telling the deranged man that an invasion force is on the way, thus distracting him enough to toss him aside, run away with Sandy and jump from a bridge.

They make it to a house where they find new clothing and try to relax. In the night, Sandy wakes up and goes looking for Greg, only to discover that he has been killed by the alien, who is still in the room. She flees to the basement and the creature is about to get her when Taylor arrives and saves her. On the way to the shack, he tells her about the creature: it is a tall extraterrestrial who hunts humans for sport to keep as trophies, using the jellyfish-like creatures as living weapons against its prey.

They wait at the shack to ambush the hunter with dynamite when Sarge shows up, almost spoiling their plan. He and Taylor fight, and Sandy is about to hit Sarge from behind when the alien arrives and kills Sarge. Taylor then shoots the creature, with little to no effect. Realizing the last chance of success, he lures it to the shack, which is then blown up by Sandy. She alone survives the horrible night.

== Cast ==
- Jack Palance as Joe Taylor
- Martin Landau as Fred "Sarge" Dobbs
- Tarah Nutter as Sandy
- Christopher S. Nelson as Greg
- Neville Brand as Leo
- Ralph Meeker as Dave
- Cameron Mitchell as Hunter
- Darby Hinton as Randy
- David Caruso as Tom
- Lynn Theel as Beth
- Sue Ane Langdon as Aggie
- Mark Ness as Bill
- Larry Storch as Scoutmaster
- Kevin Peter Hall as The Alien

== Production ==
=== Development ===
Dan Grodnik optioned the script in 1978 and hired Bennett Tramer to do a rewrite. Half way through the script, Tramer went to Grodnik and told him he had an epiphany, that he couldn't finish the sci-fi script as he just realized he was a comedy writer. He handed Grodnik the unfinished script with apologies. Grodnik sat down in his living room on an IBM typewriter on top of a TV tray table and finished the script. Shortly thereafter the film went into production. When it was time to list the credits on screen Grodnik asked Tramer if he wanted his credit to read, Bennett Tramer or Ben Tramer. Because Tramer was trying to break into the comedy writing business he felt putting his name on the film wasn't a good idea so he asked to be credited as Ben Nett. Grodnik explained to Tramer, who had no credits at the time, that even the great director Robert Wise, who directed The Sound of Music and West Side Story started off with a horror film entitled The Curse of the Cat People, and that didn't hurt his career but Tramer was adamant that the film credit him as Ben Nett. Tramer went on to write the TV series Saved by the Bell.

=== Casting ===
This was the final film role for veteran actor Ralph Meeker. Shortly after filming, he suffered a severe stroke that forced him to retire from acting, before his death in 1988. This was also the second-ever film role for David Caruso, who was 24 years old at the time.

=== Filming ===
Filming took place in Calabasas and Agoura Hills, California, and at the Paramount Ranch. The opening lake sequence was shot at Malibu Creek State Park.

The alien creature effects were designed by Greg Cannom. The alien's head mask was designed by Rick Baker for $19,000.

== Release ==
=== Theatrical ===
Without Warning was distributed theatrically by Filmways Pictures. It was released in Los Angeles, Phoenix, and Tucson on September 19, 1980, It premiered the following week in New York City on September 26.

=== Home media ===
The film was released on home video for the first time on August 5, 2014 through Shout! Factory's Scream Factory label in a Blu-ray/DVD combo pack. Kino Lorber reissued the film on Blu-ray on May 17, 2022 featuring a new 2K restoration.

== Reception ==
=== Critical response ===
Tom Buckley of The New York Times wrote: "The big moments, such as they are, in Without Warning have been borrowed from Alien and Invasion of the Body Snatchers. It is the problem of what to do between shots of the super-leeches digging into their victims' necks that has baffled the makers of this wretched film." Dread Central gave the home release of Without Warning 3.5 out of 5, singling out the Blu-ray's special features as a highlight and giving them 4 out of 5. DVD Talk recommended the movie, writing "Without Warning may not be a lost masterpiece but it is a really entertaining low budget horror picture that makes the most of its effects set pieces and a few notable cast members." The A.V. Club praised the performances of veteran actors Martin Landau and Jack Palance and called some of the special effects "damn gross."
