= San Buenaventura State Beach =

Beach in Ventura, California

- Ventura State Beach
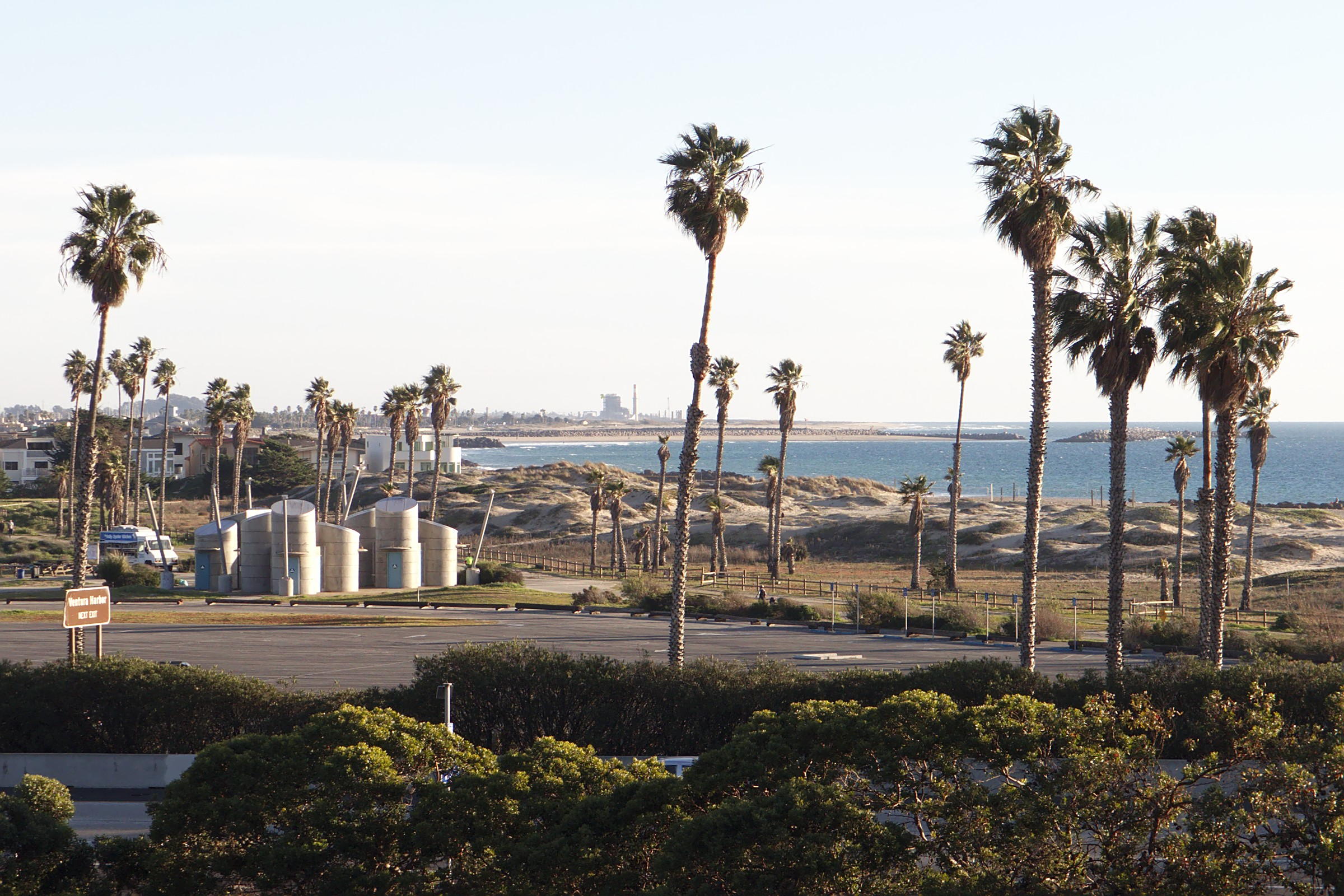

- Location within California Location within the United States
- Location: 901 Pedro Street, Ventura, California, United States
- Nearest city: Ventura, California
- Coordinates: 34°16′3″N 119°16′43″W
- Governing body: California Department of Parks and Recreation
- Website: http://www.parks.ca.gov/?page_id=600

San Buenaventura State Beach is a beach located in Ventura, California. The primary entrance is at 901 Pedro Street, off the 101 Freeway.

This beach is adjacent to the 1,700-foot (520 m) Ventura Pier that has a snack bar and restaurant. People come to this beach to surf, swim, and picnic. This is the beginning of the Omer Rains Bike Trail system that leads to other nearby beaches.

Several special events take place in this place, such as the Pirate Festival, triathlon, the "Seaside Invitational" cross country meet, the State Junior Lifeguards Program that is held each summer, and volleyball tournaments.

The nesting of the Snowy plover is monitored here, and temporary informational/warning signs and fences (or ropes) are erected near nest sites during the breeding season. To help in the recovery of the bird, nonnative vegetation that threatens the beach habitat has been removed, and beachgoers are educated on the sensitive nature of the dunes and other sandy areas.

== See also ==
- List of beaches in California
- List of California state parks
