= Tender Loving Care (1974 film) =

- Directed by: Don Edmonds
- Written by: Don Edmonds
- Produced by: Roger Corman Don Edmonds Hisako Tsukuba
- Starring: Donna Young
- Cinematography: William B. Kaplan
- Edited by: Robert Freeman
- Music by: Steve Michaels
- Distributed by: New World Pictures
- Release date: October 1974
- Running time: 72 minutes
- Country: United States
- Language: English

Tender Loving Care is a 1974 film directed by Don Edmonds and starring Donna Young. The plot concerns the adventures of three nurses. Although not part of the official "nurse" cycle of films from New World Pictures that began with The Student Nurses (1970), it was picked up for distribution by New World.

== Cast ==
- Donna Young as Karen Jordan (credited as Dona Desmond)
- Marilyn Joi as Lynn (credited as Anita King)
- Michael Asher as Dr. Ben Traynor
- Lauren Simon as Tracy (credited as Leah Simon)
- John Daniels as Jackie
- Tony Mumolo as Dr. David Aaron (credited as Tony Victor)
- Josh Taylor as Reno (credited as Tim Taylor)
- George Buck Flower as William Simpson (credited as C.D. Lafleur)
- Kathy Hilton as "Cupcake"
- Roger Pancake as Dr. Beal
- Tim Paola as Lieutenant #1
- Keith Erickson as Braddock, Officer #2
- Brad Peterson as McLean, Officer #2
- Ellen Prince as Nurse Brandon
- Maxayn as Sweet Salvation Band

== See also ==
- List of American films of 1974
