= The Bad Bunch =

- Home video cover
- Directed by: Greydon Clark
- Written by: Greydon Clark; Alvin L. Fast
- Produced by: Alvin L. Fast
- Starring: Tom Johnigarn; Greydon Clark; Jacqulin Cole; Bambi Allen; Aldo Ray; Jock Mahoney
- Cinematography: Louis Horvath
- Edited by: Earl Watson
- Music by: Ed Cobb
- Distributed by: Dimension Pictures
- Release date: 1973
- Running time: 83 minutes
- Country: United States
- Language: English

The Bad Bunch, originally released as Tom, is an American 1973 blaxploitation drama film directed by and co-starring Greydon Clark.

== Plot ==
The film is a study of prejudice and discrimination. It tells the story of a black gang who run the streets of Watts and of Jim, a white man, who tries to befriend them. Prejudice stands in the way of any friendship and turns black against white in a mid '70s, does much to show how society has progressed, but to some it may seem that "the more things change, the more they stay the same."

== Release ==
The film was released theatrically in the United States by Four Star International in 1973 and re-released by Dimension Pictures in 1976. The title was changed to Nigger Lover in some markets. Greydon Clark would explore racial themes further in his subsequent films Black Shampoo (1976) and Skinheads (1989).

The Bad Bunch was released on a double feature DVD with Clark's Hi-Riders by VCI Home Entertainment in 2010.

== Reception ==
TV guide found that "his early '70s effort from veteran exploitation director Greydon Clark attempts to create a more socially conscious variation on the blaxploitation genre, but devotes most of its time to thrills of the most lurid variety."

== See also ==
- List of American films of 1973
