= Air bladder effect =

Special effect created for motion pictures

An air bladder effect, or simply a bladder effect, is a visual special effect to achieve the appearance of bubbling or peeling skin in motion pictures, particularly horror movies. The effect involves plastic or latex balloons—known as "bladders"—which are concealed beneath the surface of foam latex or similar prosthetics. Attached to the bladders is a system of tubing that allows them to be inflated. When the bladders are inflated underneath the prosthetics (often skin prosthetics), it results in the prosthetics appearing to shift, bubble, swell, or pulsate.

== History ==
During the production of the 1973 film The Exorcist, make-up artist Dick Smith used trichloroethane, a liquid, to achieve the effect of welt-like letters being raised on a foam latex stomach. He went on to develop and refine air bladder effects for the 1980 film Altered States, which depicts lumps rippling beneath a character's skin. Smith continued to implement air bladder effects in other films, including Scanners (1981) and Spasms (1983).

Rick Baker, who worked as Smith's assistant on The Exorcist, made use of air bladder effects in combination with other mechanisms when creating a werewolf transformation sequence used in An American Werewolf in London (1981). Baker and his protégé, Rob Bottin, also incorporated air bladder effects for a werewolf transformation in The Howling, also released in 1981. Bottin again made use of air bladder effects for his work on The Thing (1982). Other films which employ bladder effects include The Beast Within (1982) and Uninvited (1987).
