= The Candy Tangerine Man =

1975 film

- Theatrical release poster
- Directed by: Matt Cimber
- Written by: Mikel Angel
- Produced by: Matt Cimber
- Starring: John Daniels; Tom Hankason; Eli Haines; Marva Farmer
- Cinematography: Ken Gibb
- Edited by: Bud Warner
- Music by: Smoke
- Production company: Moonstone Entertainment
- Distributed by: Moonstone Entertainment
- Release date: 1975
- Running time: 88 minutes
- Country: United States
- Language: English
- Box office: $1 million

The Candy Tangerine Man is a 1975 American action-adventure blaxploitation film starring John Daniels, Eli Haines and Tom Hankason. Distributed by Moonstone Entertainment, it follows the story of Ron Lewis, the powerful "Black Baron", both a pimp and a doting father. The film was directed and produced by Matt Cimber and written by Mikel Angel under the pseudonym of George Theakos.

== Plot ==
A successful Los Angeles-based businessperson, doting father of two and a loving husband, Ron Lewis turns into a completely different self at night – his alter ego, the "Black Baron", a prominent, powerful and feared pimp; but after killing two racist police officers, Dempsey and Gordon, in his pursuit, the Baron realizes that his pimping days are numbered.

== Cast ==
- John Daniels as Ron Lewis / The Black Baron
- Eli Haines as Maurice
- Tom Hankason as Dusty Compton
- Marva Farmer as Bella
- Richard Kennedy as Dempsey
- George Buck Flower as Gordon
- Meri McDonald as "Sugar"
- Marilyn Joi as Clarisse Lewis
- Talley Cochrane as Midge
- Patrick Wright as Floyd "Big Floyd"
- Mikel Angel as Vincent De Nunzio

== See also ==
- List of American films of 1975
