= Skinheads (film) =

1989 American thriller film

- Directed by: Greydon Clark
- Written by: Greydon Clark; David Reskin
- Produced by: Greydon Clark
- Starring: Barbara Bain; Chuck Connors; Frank Noon
- Cinematography: Nicholas Josef von Sternberg
- Edited by: Travis Clark
- Music by: Dan Slider
- Distributed by: Greydon Clark Productions
- Release date: August 8, 1989 (France)
- Running time: 94 minutes
- Country: United States
- Language: English

Skinheads is a 1989 American thriller film, directed, written and produced by Greydon Clark. It is Clark's third film to deal with racial themes, after The Bad Bunch (1973) and Black Shampoo (1976).

== Plot ==
A group of neo-Nazi skinheads violently rob a Jewish grocery. After they flee the scene of the crime, they stop at a roadside diner where they encounter some traveling students. The neo-Nazis terrorize the students and the owner of the diner, leaving two survivors who escape to the nearby Colorado mountains. The neo-Nazis give chase but are met with opposition when a World War II veteran living in the woods comes to the aid of the students.

== Cast ==
- Barbara Bain as Martha
- Jason Culp as Jeff
- Elizabeth Sagal as Amy
- Chuck Connors as Mr. Huston
- Frank Noon as Walt
