= Ventura Pier =

Pier in Ventura, California

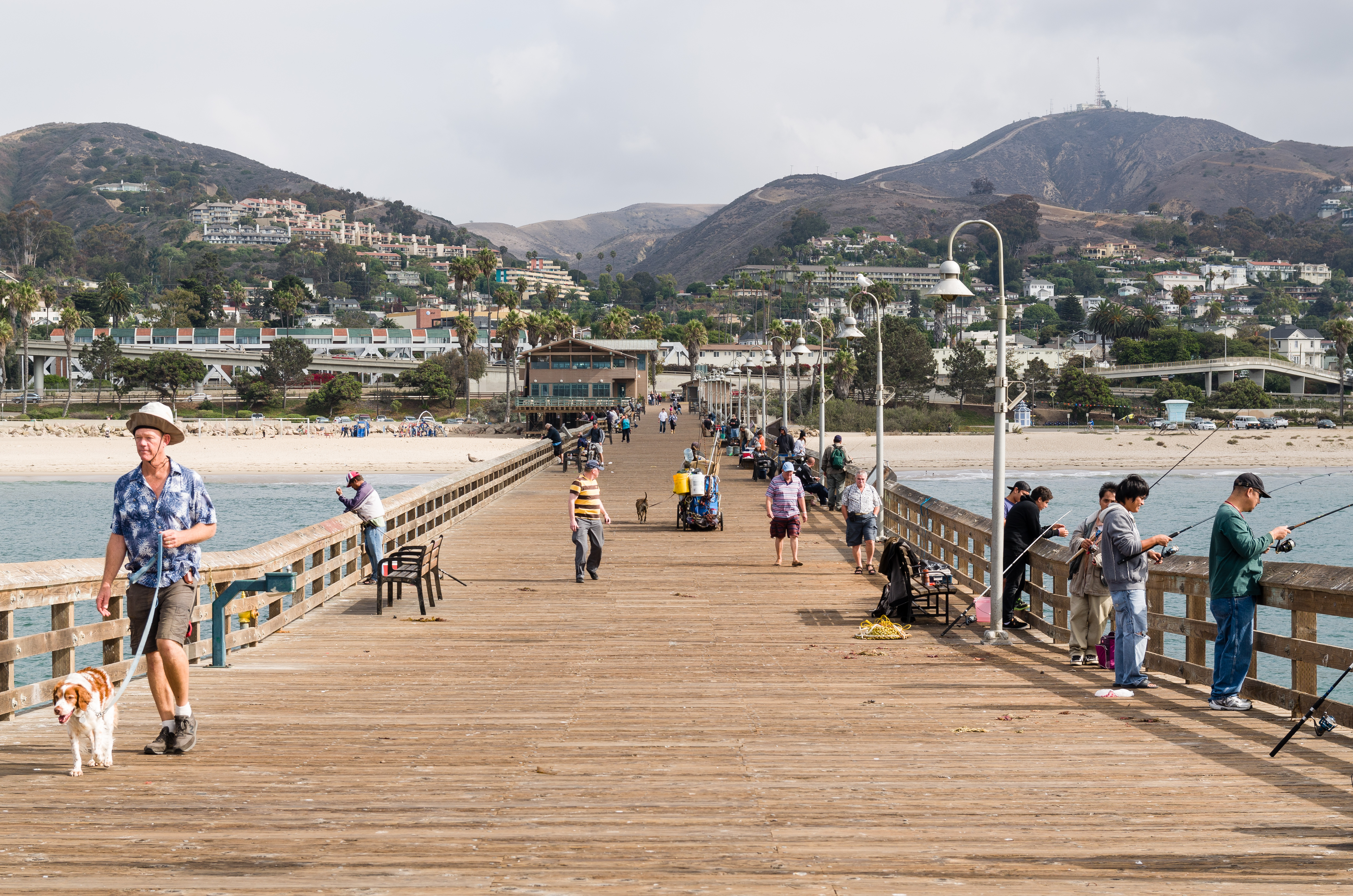
- Ventura Pier with fishermen, 2013
- Type: Fishing pier
- Spans: Pacific Ocean
- Location: Ventura, California, U.S.
- Coordinates: 34.2741°N 119.2915°W
- Owner: City of Ventura

Characteristics
- Construction: Douglas fir (pilings and deck)
- Total length: 1,600 ft (490 m)
- Width: 25.5 to 67.66 ft (7.77 to 20.62 m)

History
- Opening date: 1872
- Ventura Historic Landmark No. 20

The Ventura Pier, previously known as the Ventura Wharf and the San Buenaventura Wharf, is a wooden pier located on the Pacific Ocean in Ventura, California. The pier has been designated as Ventura Historic Landmark No. 20. It is the oldest pier in California.

The pier was first built in 1872 and served for many years as a transportation hub and commercial wharf used to bring merchandise and lumber to the area and to export the area's agricultural products and crude oil. No longer used as a commercial wharf, it is used for fishing and as a pedestrian walkway with views of Ventura and the Channel Islands. It has been partially destroyed by storms and waves on several occasions and by collision with the steamer Coos Bay in 1914. From 1938 to 1995, it was the largest wooden pier on the California coast at a length of 1,958 feet (597 meters). The pier is 1,600 feet (490 meters) long in its current configuration. The structure is a centerpiece of tourism promotion and hosts families, fishers, and tourists daily.

== Ownership and facilities ==
The Ventura Pier is owned and operated by the City of Ventura. The city acquired the pier in 1993 from the State of California. The California Department of Parks and Recreation owned the pier from 1949 to 1993. The city had previously owned the pier from 1940 to 1949. Before 1940, the pier was privately owned.

The pier features the following activities:

- Fishing from the pier deck. Species caught from the pier include jacksmelt, mackerel, sand sharks, perch, croaker, stingrays, Tom cod, halibut, and crabs. Cleaning stations are provided at locations along the pier. No fishing license is required to fish from the pier, but signs are posted on and around the cleaning stations identifying limitations on fishing activities, including size and species restrictions.
- The pier is popular for walking, jogging, and bicycling and has views of the City of Ventura, the Channel Islands National Park (especially Anacapa and Santa Cruz Islands), Surfers Point, the Santa Barbara Channel, and the Topatopa Mountains. Evening views include sunsets and stargazing. Interpretive panels are displayed along the pier with information on the pier's history, local marine life and birds, the Channel Islands, and the Chumash Indians. The pier is also equipped with benches and restrooms.
- The pier has a seafood restaurant (Eric Ericsson's Fish Co), a brewery (Madewest), and a taco shack (Beach House Tacos).
- The pier is adjacent to the San Buenaventura State Beach and the Omer Rains Coastal Bikeway. At the base of the pier on the west side, there is the Ventura Promenade Beach Playground. At the base of the pier on the east side, there is a kiosk for the rental of bicycles, surreys, and beach equipment.

Pier Into The Future is a non-profit organization formed in 1993 to assist in preserving and maintaining the pier. The organization has established an endowment to support the pier and raises funds by selling naming opportunities and with two annual fundraising events: Pier Under the Stars and a sunset dinner in the spring.

== History ==
=== Construction and purpose ===
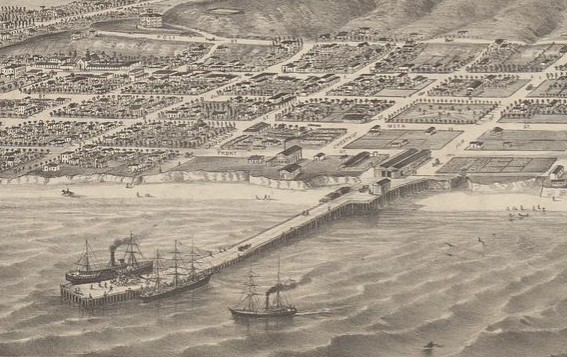
Ventura Wharf, 1877 (Courtesy of UC Berkeley, Bancroft Library)

On May 20, 1871, two meetings of San Buenaventura citizens were held at Spear's Hall, one in the morning and a follow-up in the evening, to discuss the construction of a wharf in Ventura. Articles of incorporation and bylaws were adopted to form a company undertaking the project. Joseph Wolfson and his father-in-law Juan Camarillo were principal forces behind the wharf. The wharf was built to promote the city's growth.

On May 18, 1872, the first piling for the wharf was driven into the ground. A ceremony was held at which Arcadia Camarillo, the wife of Joseph Wolfson, who led the effort to build the wharf, broke a bottle of wine over the first piling. The wharf was completed nearly five months later on October 5, 1872. The Ventura Signal wrote: "At last a steamer can lay alongside of the wharf, and discharge and take on cargo and passengers. It is a grand improvement upon the old way and duly appreciated by shippers and travelers." Robert Sudden was hired as the wharf manager, a position he held for over two decades.

An oil pipeline was built through the Santa Clara River Valley from the Pico Canyon Oilfield near Newhall in 1886. After being transferred to ships, the oil was transported to San Francisco. Prior to construction of the wharf and continuing until the arrival of the railroad in 1887, ground transportation to Ventura was difficult, particularly in the rainy season when the flow of the Ventura and Santa Clara Rivers isolated the city. Accordingly, ships docking at the wharf also served as a principal means of transportation to and from Ventura.

In its early decades of operation, the pier was known as the Ventura Wharf and was used as a commercial wharf. The products shipped from the Ventura Wharf included agricultural products and, eventually, crude oil from the local oil fields. In its annual statement for the year ending April 30, 1898, the Ventura Wharf Company reported exports that included 518,204 barrels (82,387,900 L) of bulk oil, 80,384 bags of beans (all varieties), 28,819 bags of corn, 14,721 bags of barley, 11,855 boxes of oranges, and 6,285 boxes of lemons.

=== Shipwrecks, storms, and fires ===
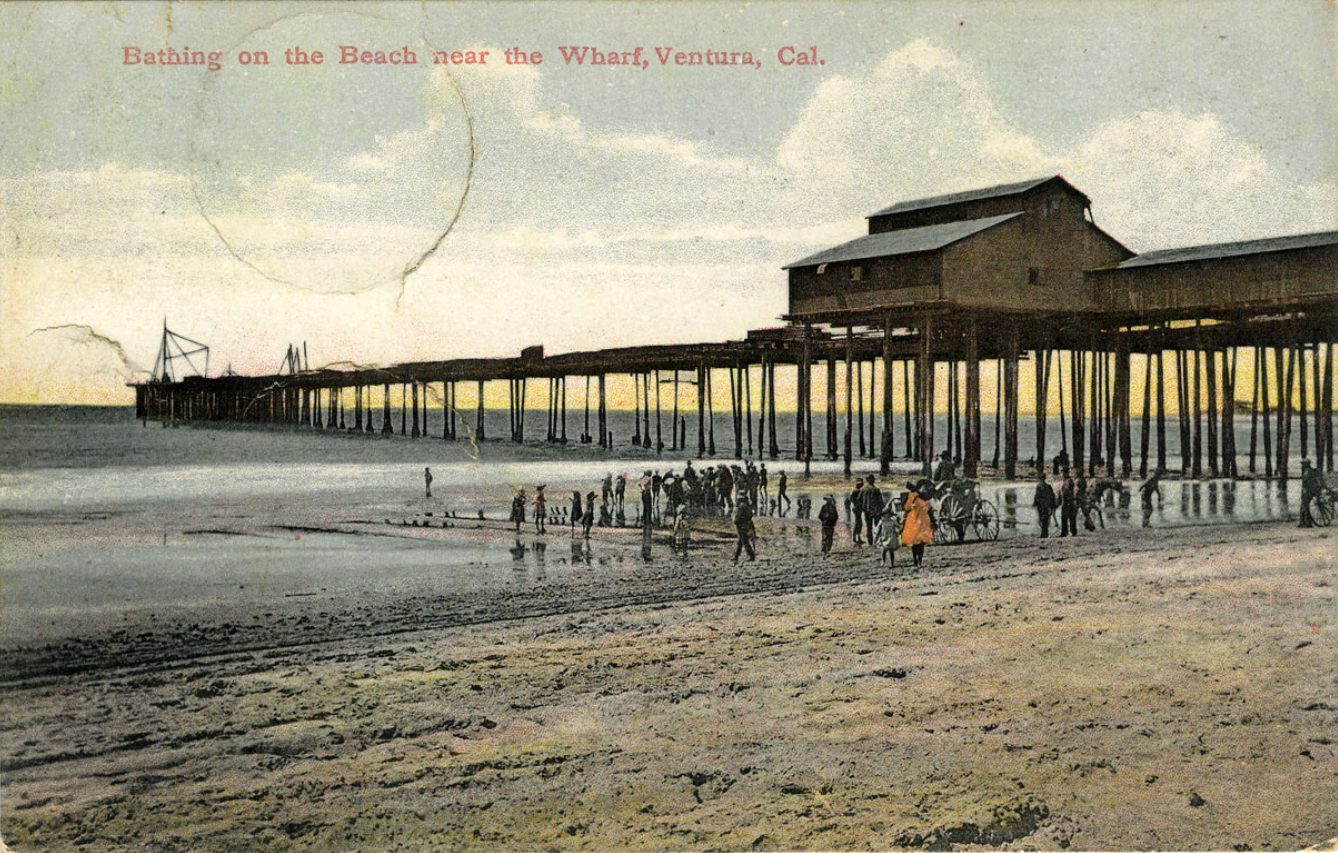
Ventura Pier, c. 1910

During its years of operation as a wharf, the pier was damaged on multiple occasions by storms, shipwrecks, and fire.

In 1877 or 1878, the wharf was damaged by storms and repaired within weeks.

On June 25, 1889, the W. L. Hardison, a steamer operated by oil interests that would soon become the Union Oil Company of California in Santa Paula, California, became engulfed in fire at the wharf after a cook spilled a pan of burning fat in the galley while the ship was taking on a load of 2,000 barrels of crude oil. The ship and cargo were a total loss, but the six crewmen on board were able to escape.

Twenty-five years later, on December 19, 1914, the steamer Coos Bay was wrecked at the wharf. The ship attempted to moor "when a strong rip tide swung her hard against the piling." The ship swung under the wharf, and "heavy swell . . . made the steamer a trip-hammer pounding against the structure from the under-side and lifting large sections of the wharf almost at every blow." The ship sunk in 12 feet (3.7 meters) of water, and for two days, the ship continued to "roll with the incoming waves . . . tearing the wharf to pieces when she strikes."

On February 13, 1926, heavy surf destroyed the wharf during a winter storm. George Proctor, an accountant for the Ventura Wharf & Warehouse Co., was killed when he walked to the end of the wharf as the structure collapsed below him. A middle selection collapsed first, leaving Proctor stranded. The outer portion then collapsed, dropping Proctor to the water below.

Again, in December 1934, heavy waves caused a partial collapse of the pier.

=== Fishing and recreation ===
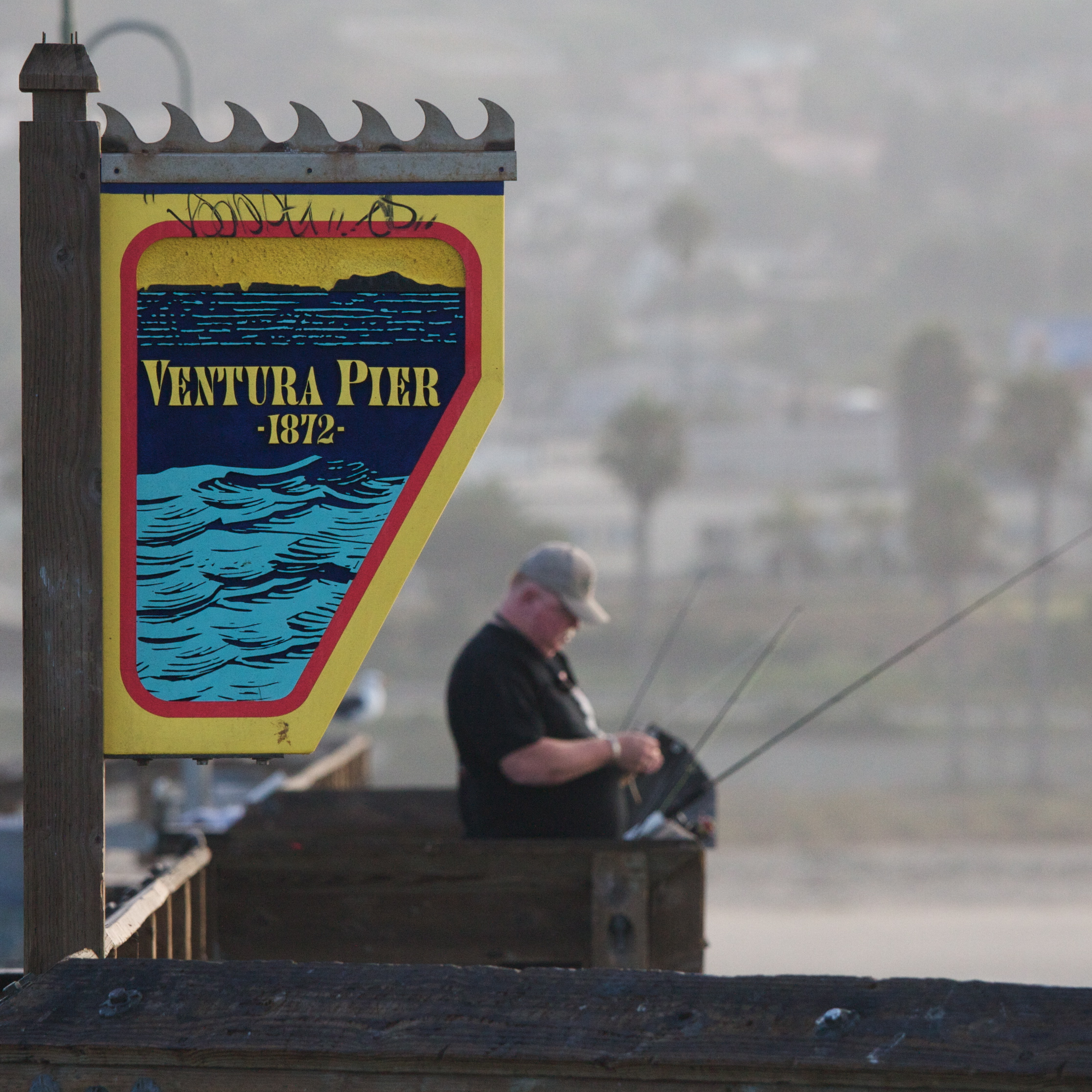
Ventura Pier in 2008

The pier reached its greatest length of 1,958 feet (597 meters) when it was rebuilt after being damaged in a winter storm in 1937. At its maximum length, it was the longest wooden pier in California.

Like the wharf that preceded it, the pier experienced repeated damage from storms and heavy surf. Notable instances include the following:

- On November 27, 1947, the Coos Bay, buried near the pier since 1914, was loosened from the sand and washed ashore, again causing damage. Hundreds of sight-seers "swarmed over the hull."
- On April 22, 1950, the pier reopened after a closure of several months following storm damage. Members of the Ventura County Boat Club dressed in costumes of Indian medicine men and performed a ritual intended to assure good fishing.
- In 1977 and 1978, winter storms again damaged the pier. It was closed for several months in late 1979 and early 1980 to undertake more than $163,000 in repairs, including replacing 35 pilings.
- In 1976, the pier was designated as Ventura Historic Landmark No. 20.
- In January 1983, winter storms damaged the pier, and the last 600 feet (180 meters) were closed and barricaded. Thirty-one pilings and guardrails were replaced at a cost of $100,000. The pier was closed for repairs from September to December 1984.
- In 1986, the pier was again damaged in winter storms and was closed for two years. In July 1988, the pier was re-opened, though the last section of approximately 400 feet (120 meters) remained closed.

In October 1993, the pier re-opened following a $3.5 million rehabilitation, including a new deck and installing a "swell-actuated sculpture" titled "Wavespout" that sprayed seawater as waves rolled by. It was California's longest wooden pier with a deck length of 1,958 feet (597 meters). A ribbon-cutting ceremony was presided over by Mayor Greg Carson. The far end of the pier had been closed since 1986.

After heavy surf knocked out more than 20 pilings in December 1994 and January 1995, the pier closed again. Then, on December 13, 1995, high surf from a storm sheared off approximately 420 feet (130 meters) of the pier. With the loss of this section, the pier ceased being the longest wooden pier on the California coast. The "Wavespout" sculpture at the end of the pier was also lost in the storm.

Following the 1995 storm damage, the city opted not to rebuild the pier to its prior length. On April 1, 2000, the pier re-opened after a $2.2-million renovation that included steel-reinforced pilings and a new octagonal section at the pier's end. The current length is 1,600 feet (490 meters).

The 2022–2023 winter storms caused severe damage to the pier, closing a large portion due to safety concerns. This portion of the pier was reopened on June 29, 2024.

== In popular culture ==
The Ventura Pier is a popular filming spot and has appeared in such programs as "Melrose Place". Other references to the pier in popular culture include:

- In the movie Little Miss Sunshine, characters Frank (Steve Carell) and Dwayne (Paul Dano) have a heart-to-heart on the Ventura Pier.
- The Ventura Pier was featured in the 2014 novel, "Pier Rats" by Bruce Greif

== Gallery ==
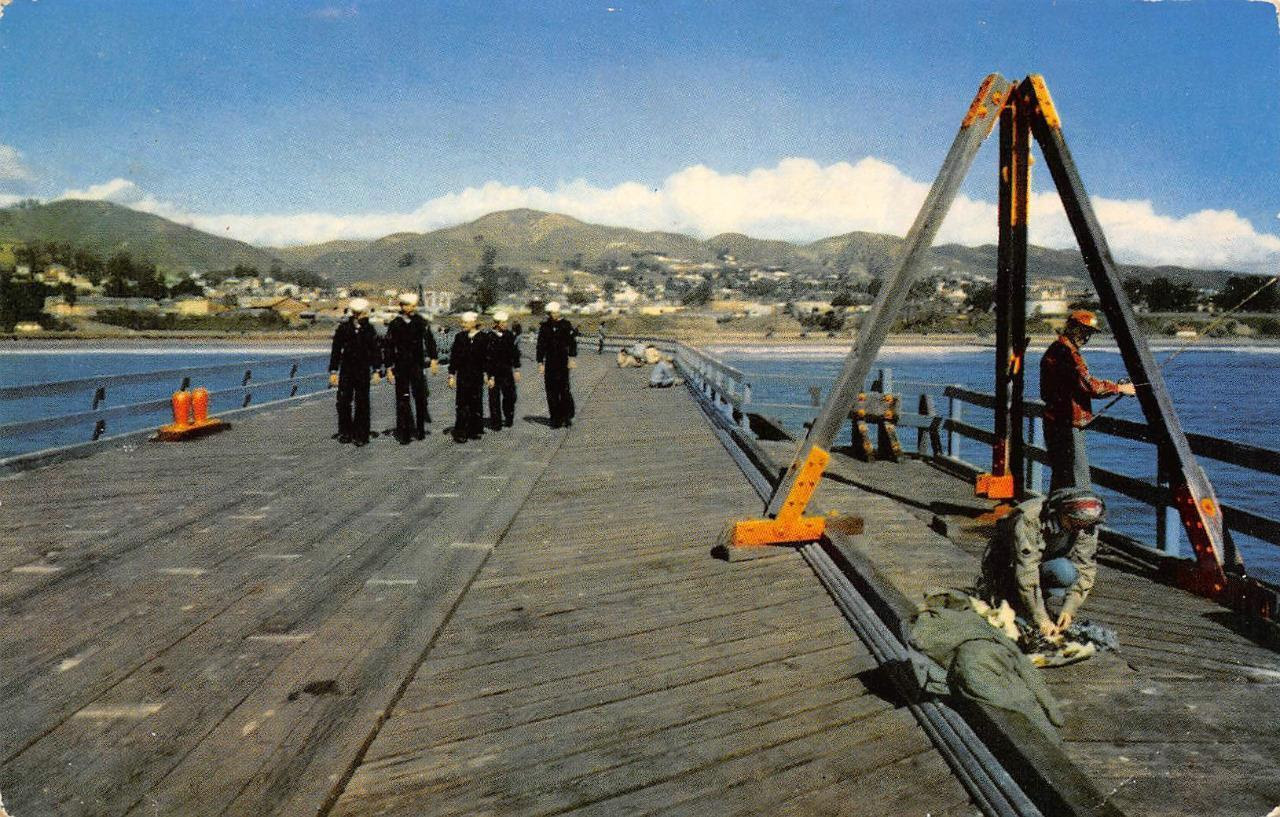
View from pier, c. 1955

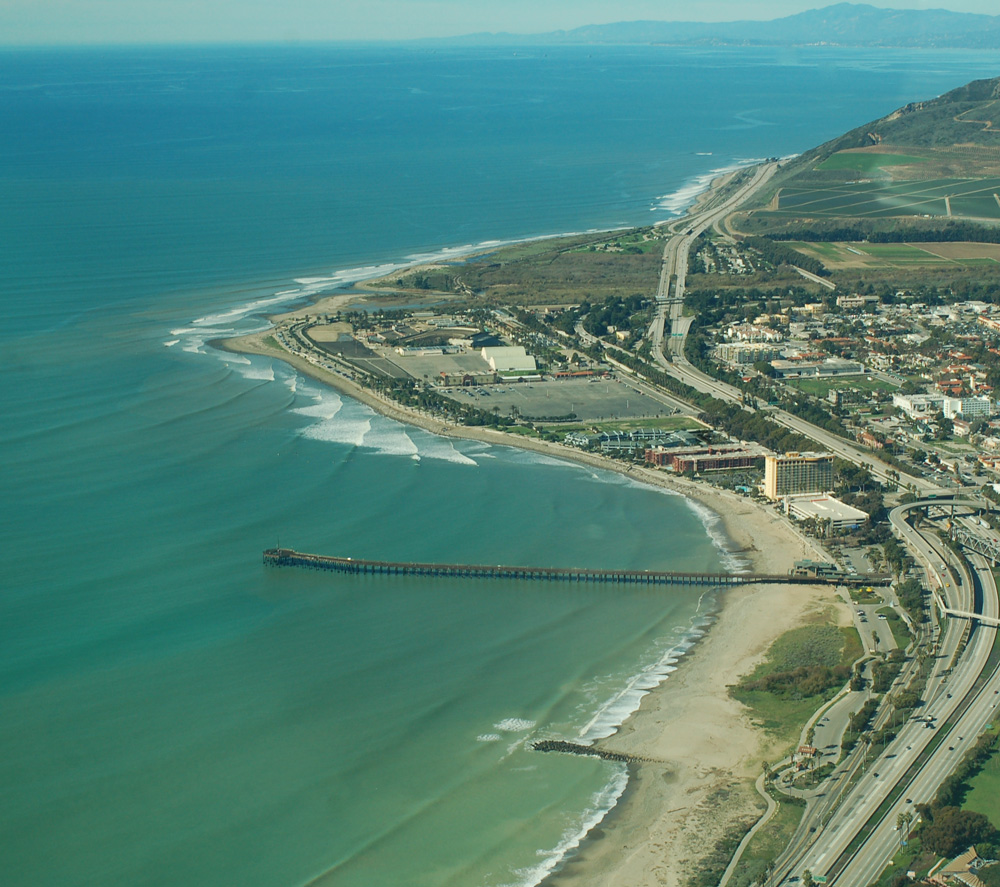
January 2010

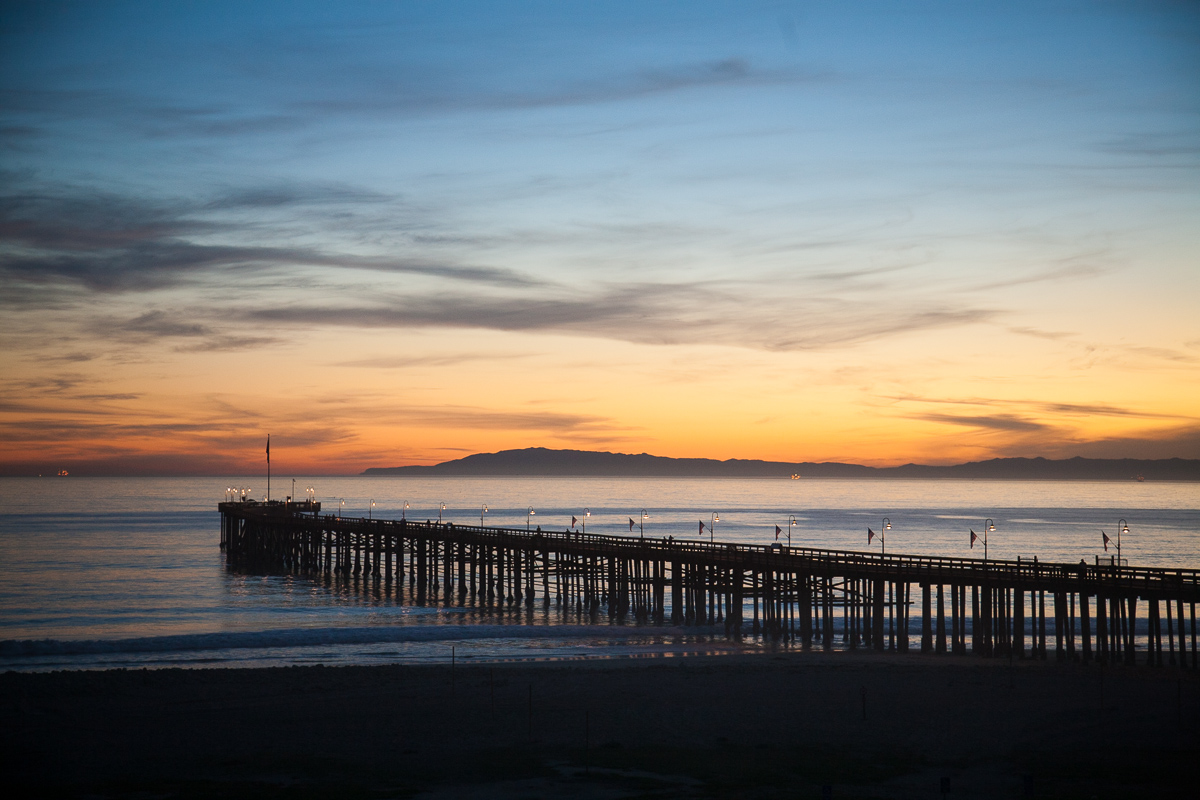
November 2010

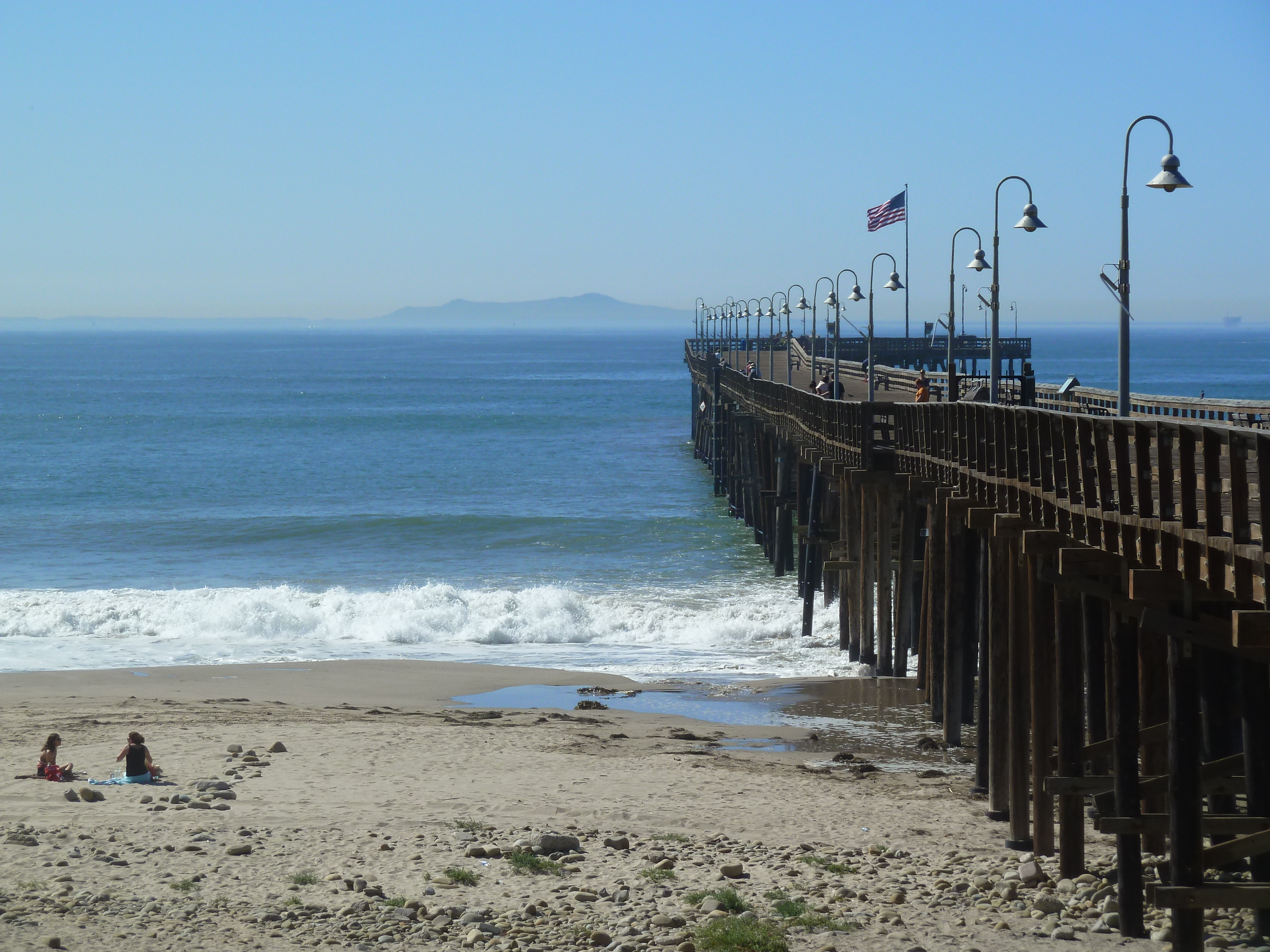
October 2011

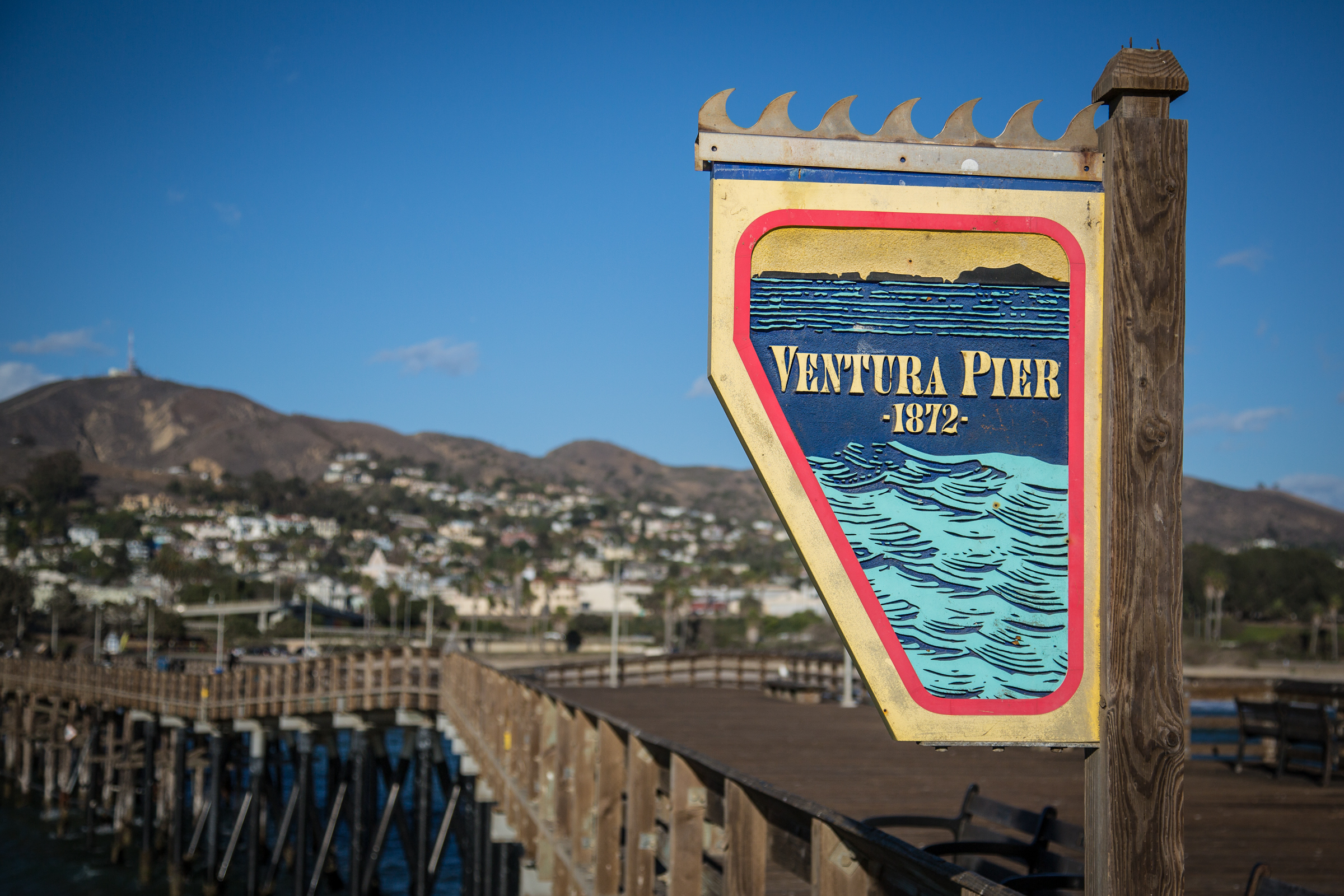
November 2012

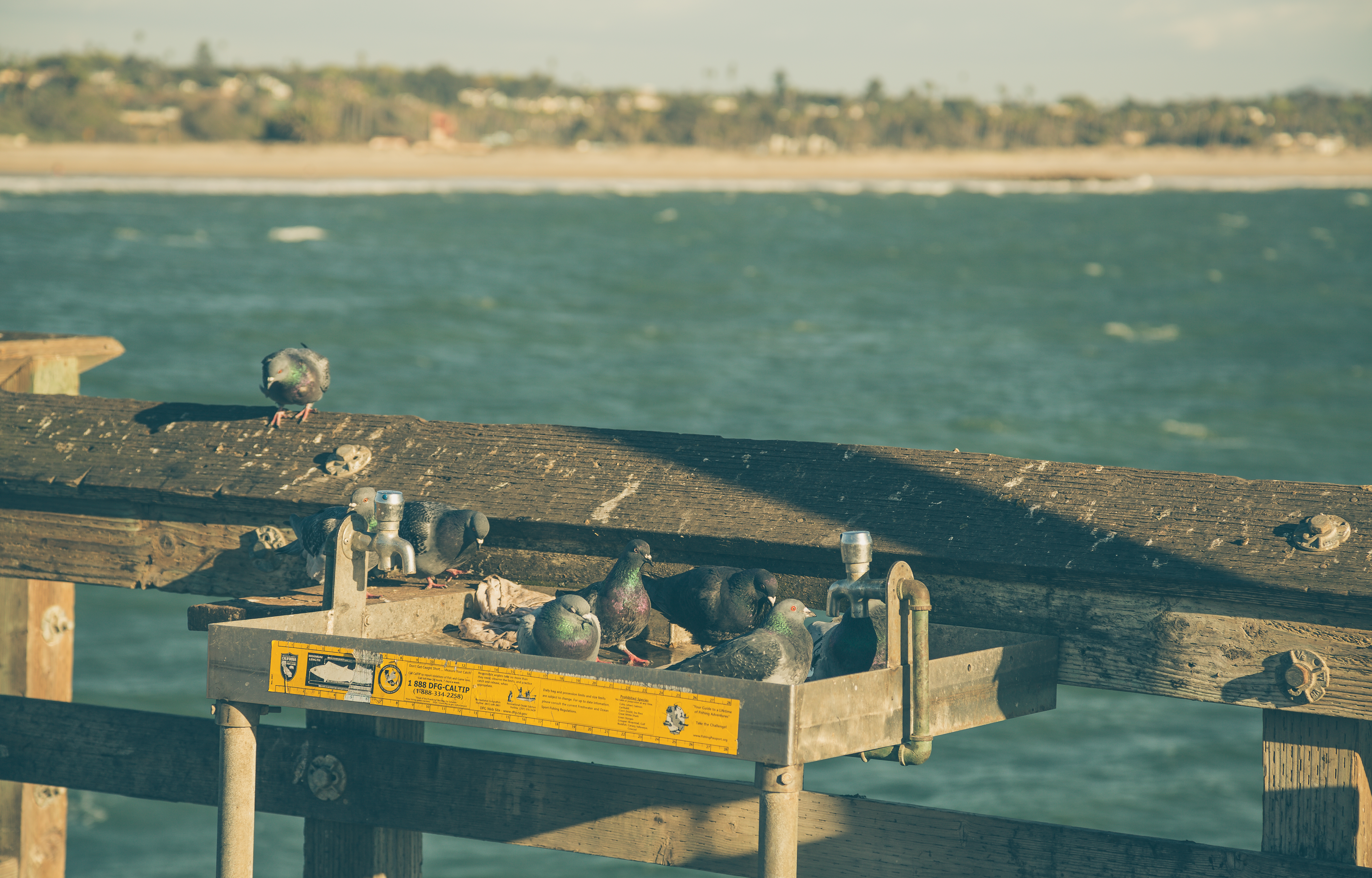
November 2012

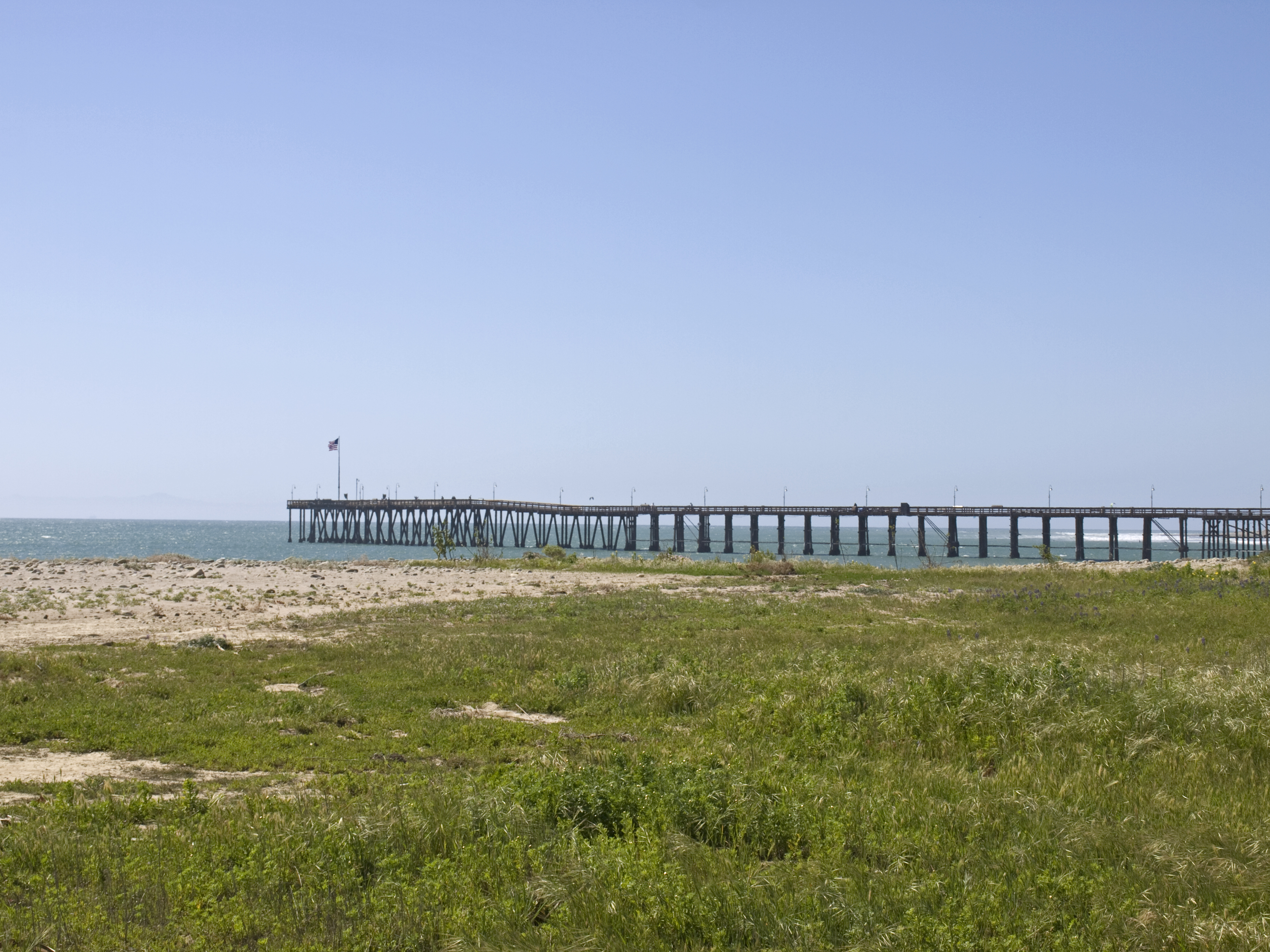
March 2014

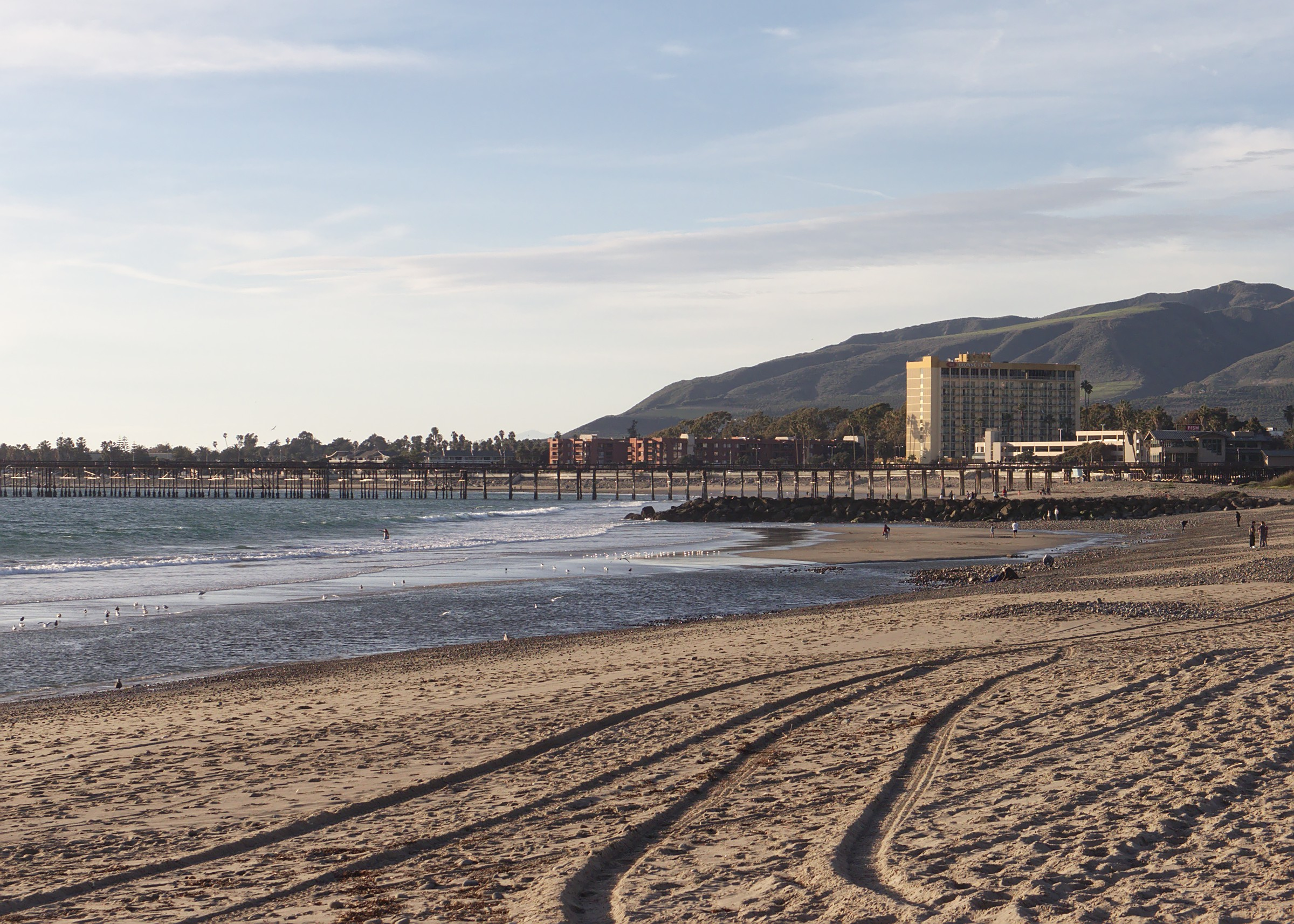
January 2015

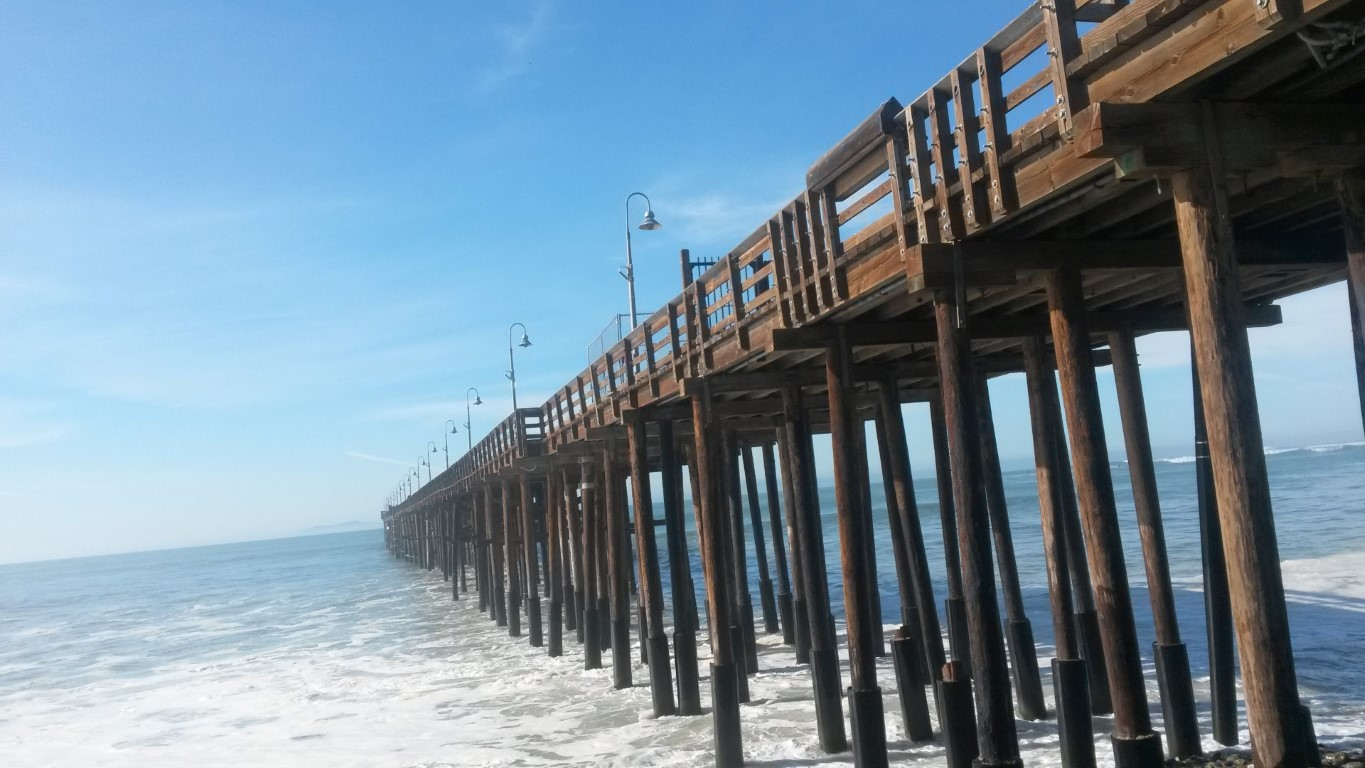
February 2016

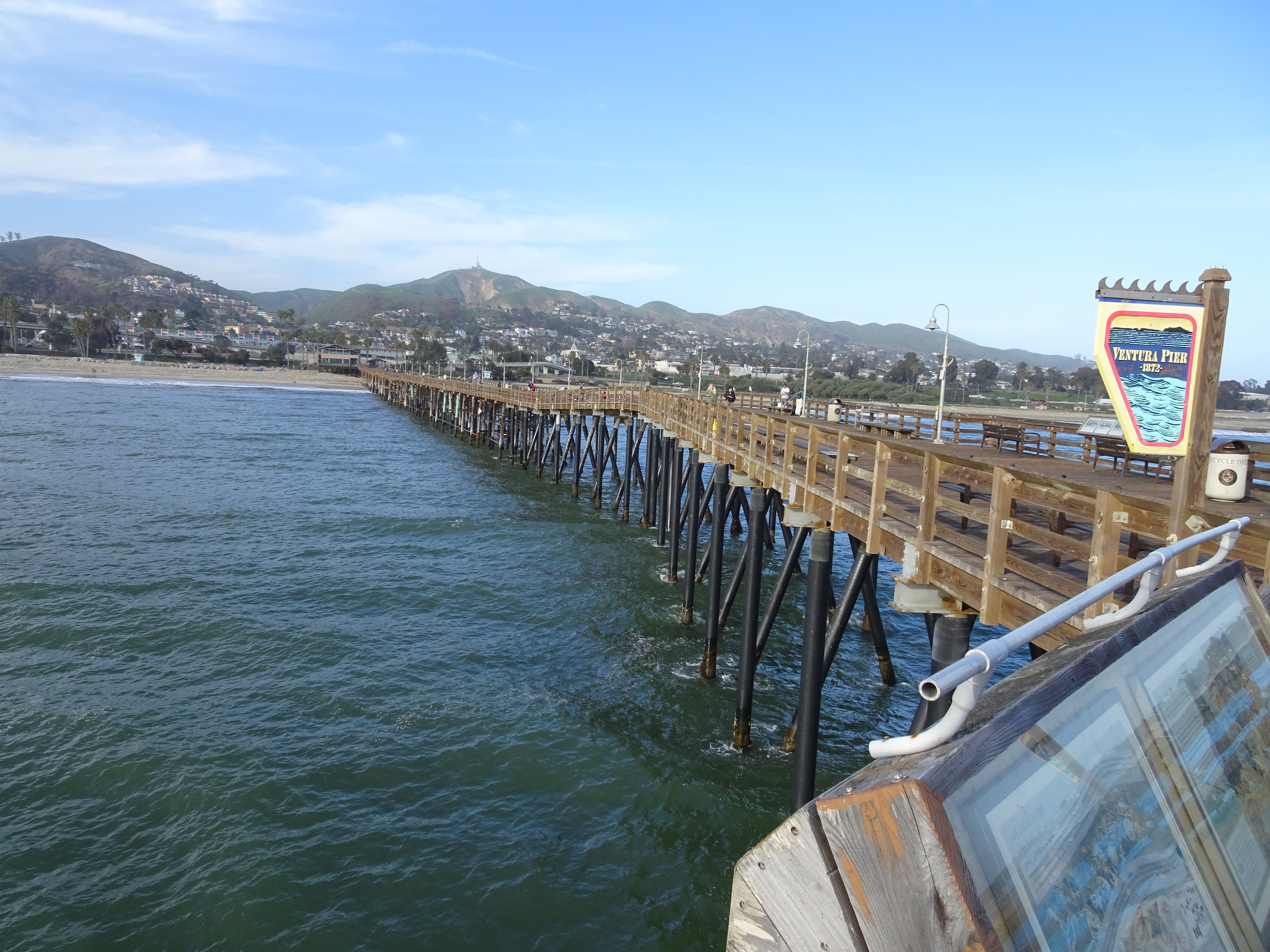
April 2018

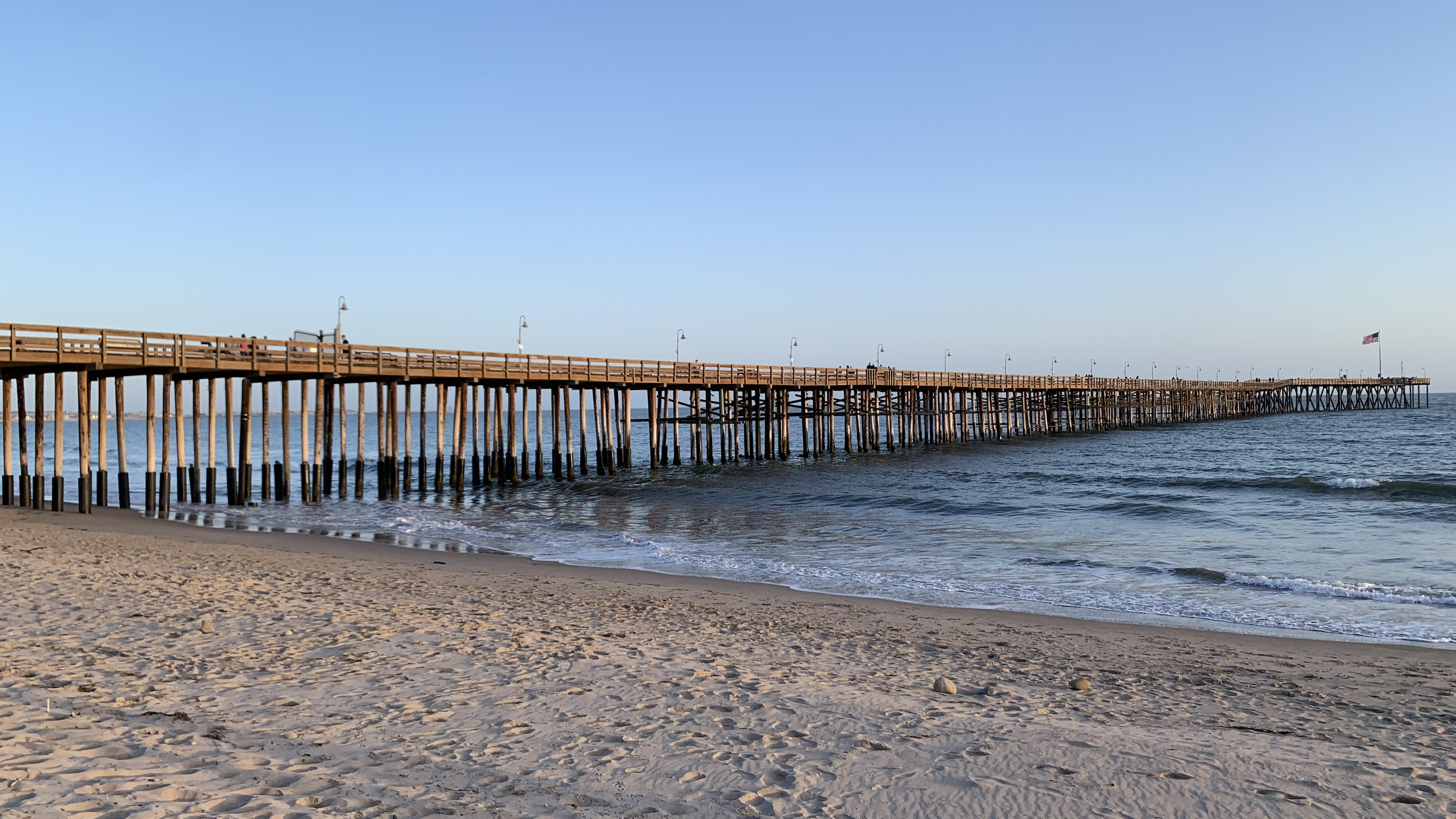
April 2022

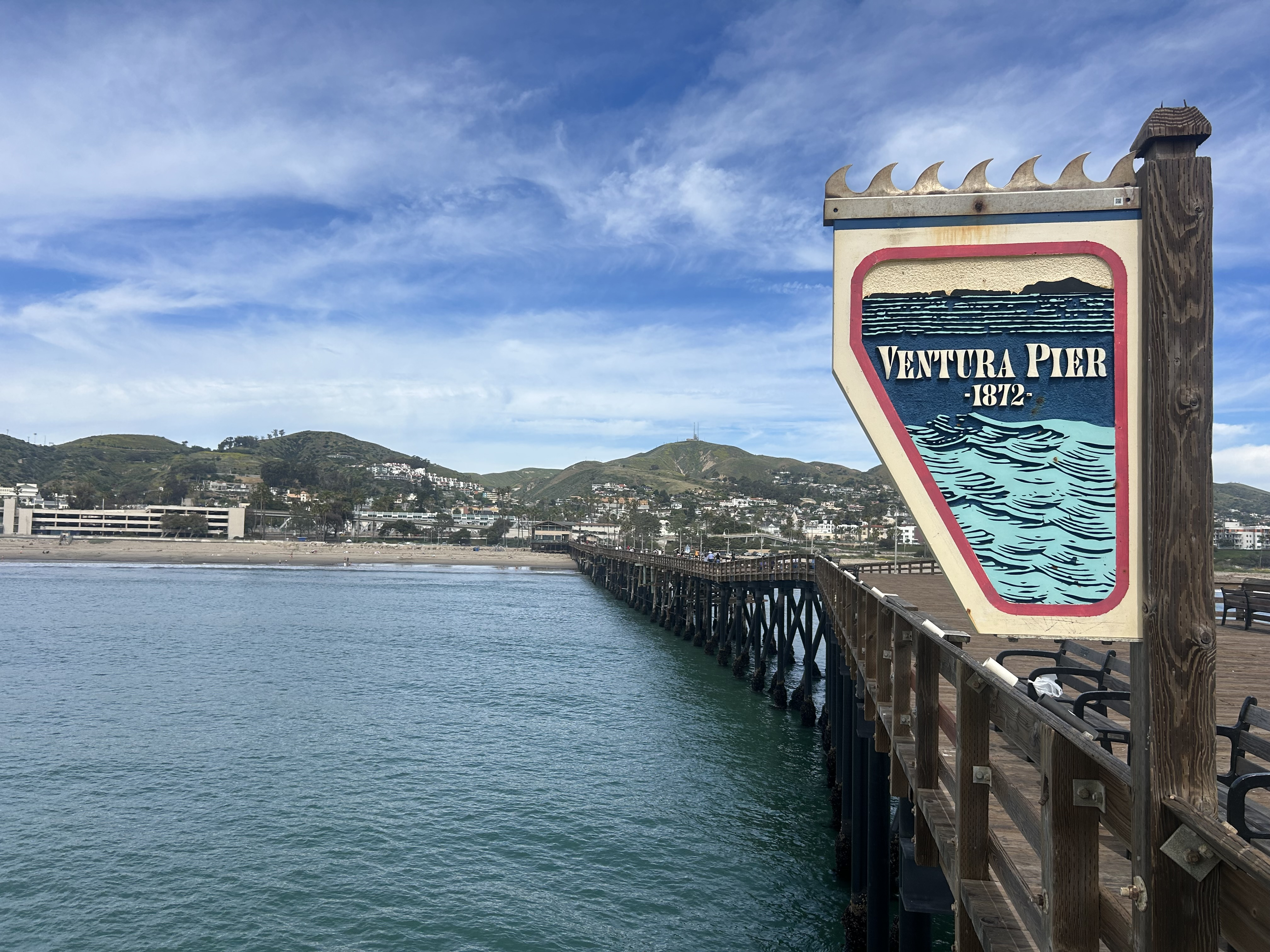
March 2026

== See also ==
- City of Ventura Historic Landmarks and Districts
