= Greydon Clark =

American film director

- Born: February 7, 1943 (age 83); Niles, Michigan, U.S.
- Occupations: Screenwriter, director, producer, actor
- Years active: 1969–present

Greydon Clark (born February 7, 1943) is an American screenwriter, director, producer, and actor. His career spans several decades and genres, although the majority of his work has been low-budget productions in the action/horror genres. His most recent work was writing and directing the 1998 science fiction film Stargames (also seen written as Star Games), in which he was also featured.

Between 1969 and 1989, Clark acted in a series of action/horror films, including Satan's Sadists, The Mighty Gorga, Hell's Bloody Devils, Dracula vs. Frankenstein, and Psychic Killer. Beginning in 1973, he wrote and directed a series of films, including The Bad Bunch (in which he also starred), Black Shampoo, Satan's Cheerleaders, Hi-Riders, Angels Revenge, Uninvited, Dance Macabre, Skinheads, and Stargames. In 1980 he directed The Return and Without Warning.

In 2013, Clark released his autobiography, On the Cheap: My Life in Low Budget Filmmaking.

== Filmography ==
Year	Title	Director	Writer	Producer
1969	Satan's Sadists		Yes	
1971	Mothers, Fathers and Lovers	Yes		
1973	The Bad Bunch	Yes	Yes	
1975	Psychic Killer		Yes	Associate
1976	Black Shampoo	Yes	Yes	
1977	Satan's Cheerleaders	Yes	Yes	
1978	Hi-Riders	Yes	Yes	
1979	Angels Revenge	Yes	Yes	Yes
1980	The Return	Yes		Yes
1980	Without Warning	Yes		Yes
1982	Wacko	Yes		Yes
1983	Joysticks	Yes		Yes
1985	Final Justice	Yes	Yes	Yes
1989	Skinheads	Yes	Yes	Yes
1990	The Forbidden Dance	Yes		
1990	Out of Sight, Out of Mind	Yes		
1992	Mad Dog Coll	Yes		
1992	Dance Macabre	Yes	Yes	
1992	Russian Holiday	Yes		
1994	Dark Future	Yes	Story	Yes
1998	Star Games	Yes	Yes	Yes

Direct-to-video

Year	Title	Director	Writer	Producer
1987	Uninvited	Yes	Yes	Yes

Television

Year	Title	Director	Writer	Notes
1997	Mike Hammer, Private Eye	Yes	Yes	Directed episode: "Sins of the Fathers"; Wrote and directed episode: "A Penny Saved"

Acting roles

Year	Title	Role	Notes
1969	Satan's Sadists	Acid	
1969	The Mighty Gorga	Dan Remington	
1970	Hell's Bloody Devils	Anderson	Also assistant director
1971	Mothers, Fathers and Lovers		Cameo
1971	Dracula vs. Frankenstein	Strange	
1973	The Bad Bunch	Jim	
1975	Psychic Killer	Police Sgt. Marv Sowash	
1976	Black Shampoo	Wilson's Man on Phone	Voice
1979	Angels Revenge	Director	
1980	The Return	Alan	
1985	Final Justice	Sheriff Bob	
1987	Uninvited	Lab doctor	
1992	Dance Macabre	Anderson	
1998	Star Games	Adam	
