= Private Duty Nurses =

1970 film by George Armitage

- Theatrical release poster
- Directed by: George Armitage
- Written by: George Armitage
- Produced by: George Armitage
- Cinematography: John McNichol
- Edited by: Alan Collins
- Music by: Sky
- Distributed by: New World Pictures
- Release date: September 1, 1971
- Country: United States
- Language: English

Private Duty Nurses is a 1971 American film written and directed by George Armitage. It is a sequel to The Student Nurses (1970) for New World Pictures. Roger Corman says they got the idea for the title after being sent a letter of complaint about the first film from the Private Duty Nurses Association.

The film was followed by Night Call Nurses (1972).

== Plot ==
Nurse Spring takes care of grumpy Vietnam veteran Domino who has a plate in his head and is in need of surgery from Dr. McClintock. Nurse Lynn fights against water pollution, and gets involved with Dewey.

== Cast ==
- Katherine Cannon as Spring
- Joyce Williams as Lola
- Pegi Boucher as Lynn
- Joseph Kaufmann as Dr. Selden
- Dennis Redfield as Domino
- Robert F. Simon as Dr. Sutton
- Morris Buchanan as Kirby
- Herbert Jefferson Jr. as Dr. Elton
- Paul Hampton as Dewey
- Paul Gleason as Dr. McClintock

== Production ==
Stephanie Rothman who had made The Student Nurses was approached to make the sequel but turned it down. George Armitage had worked on a few films for Roger Corman, acting in Von Richtofen and Brown and writing and acting in Gas-s-s-s. He wanted to direct. Armitage:

Peter Bogdanovich and Francis [Ford Coppola] had left working with Roger, so there was an opening there for directors, I asked him if I could direct, and he said sure. He said: "Would you like to do a nurse movie or a stewardess move?" I said I'd like to do a stewardess movie, and he said: "Okay, well then you can do the nurse movie." Okay! Anyways, I got into it, and I wrote the script, and I got Everett Chambers, from Peyton Place, a crew of some TV guys that I'd worked with, and some young commercial crew. This fellow called Fouad Said had invented this thing called Cinemobile ... and I used it to film on location. I did everything on location ... I shot the whole movie in the South Bay, Manhattan Beach—it's exactly the same place and time period that Paul Thomas Anderson used in Inherent Vice.

Armitage was familiar with the Manhattan Beach area having surfed there when he was younger.

Armitage said the film had to feature sex but he put in a let-down sex scene at the beginning.

I was talking to the girls and they said: "Hey, why don't you do a guy who's just a lousy lay. Sometimes you run into that." And I thought that'd be perfect for the South Bay, because it was a pretty crazy culture going on down there at the time, so that's what we did.

Armitage heard about the band Sky, went to see them perform at a high school, and cast them in the film.

Armitage says Corman left him alone for most of the film.

He wanted us to do whatever we felt, what we were thinking of poetically, socially, culturally at the time. So I tried to look at it from a woman's point-of-view, adding my own feelings about what was going on. Corman and I got along very well. I didn't like the way Hollywood treated him—he was kind of an underdog and I loved the fact that he would just say, "Here, go make the movie." He never came to the set, he totally allowed us to do what we were doing ... And Private Duty Nurses was done in 15 days.

== Reception ==
=== Critical response ===
Writing for Turner Classic Movies, critic Nathaniel Thompson described the film as "basically a less humorous rehash of The Student Nurses, with another curvy threesome navigating a sea of obstacles," that "little of [the plot] has a connection to the actual hospital," and "the lack of narrative direction ultimately grounds the entire enterprise." In a review of the film in Slant magazine, critic Budd Wilkins wrote that supporting actor Paul Hampton "takes this one by a country mile, his psychedelic slickster easily the funniest thing in the film other than Sky, house band at (Schlumpfelders's) the watering hole Dewey patronizes, who get to perform their classic ode to oral fixation 'How’s That Treatin’ Your Mouth, Babe?'" Critic Donald Guarisco wrote in AllMovie that the film "balanc[ed] exploitation staples like sex and action with a dash of social commentary and some artsy filmmaking techniques," and "it is well-crafted enough to make a modest, entertaining little time-killer for exploitation film fans."

Filmink called it "a weak entry in the series. The pace is sluggish, it’s not that sexy, there’s little sense of camaraderie between the women, and the cast is, with a few exceptions, weak. The most unforgivable thing about the movie: all the girls care about is helping men rather than do things themselves."

== See also ==
- List of American films of 1971
