= The Student Teachers =

1973 film by Jonathan Kaplan

- Theatrical release poster
- Directed by: Jonathan Kaplan
- Written by: Jonathan Kaplan; Danny Opatoshu
- Produced by: Julie Corman
- Starring: Susan Damante; Brooke Mills; Brenda Sutton
- Cinematography: Stephen M. Katz
- Music by: David Nichtern
- Production company: New World Pictures
- Distributed by: New World Pictures
- Release date: May 31, 1973 (U.S.)
- Running time: 90 minutes
- Country: U.S.
- Language: English
- Budget: Under $100,000
- Box office: $1,078,000 (U.S./Canada rentals)

The Student Teachers is a 1973 American exploitation film directed by Jonathan Kaplan and produced by Julie Corman. Part of the "nurse" cycle of films that began with The Student Nurses (1970), it was made by the same team behind Night Call Nurses. The film was shot in 15 days for under $100,000 and became one of the most successful entries in the series.

== Plot ==
Three new teachers at Valley High School clash with Principal Peters, the administration, and parents over their teaching methods.

Rachel Burton teaches a girls' sex education class. Dissatisfied with a curriculum limited to disease prevention and abstinence, she adds material on contraception and sexual health, holds after-school sessions, and has students make an educational film on subjects including pornography and gender dynamics. Administrators learn of the sessions, and parents complain about the content. Burton defends her approach but is dismissed.

Tracy Davis teaches art and proposes adding figure photography to the curriculum. Principal Peters rejects the proposal and directs Davis to keep to the standard lesson plans. Davis continues the project off campus with a student, Mickey, in his family's darkroom. Her involvement with Mickey and the nature of the project strain her relationship with her boyfriend, Alex, who objects to both.

Jody Hawkins mentors Carnell Smith, a former dropout, and involves him in Second Chance, an alternative school serving single mothers, ex-convicts, and other at-risk populations. When the program runs out of money, Hawkins poses as a buyer to infiltrate the drug operation of Smith's former employer, Dinwiddie. Working with Smith and others, she swaps out the heroin for fake product, setting the operation's members against each other, and takes the money to keep the school running.

All three teachers face opposition from Principal Peters and from parents concerned about the school's image, and ultimately resign to join the staff at Second Chance.

== Cast ==
- Susan Damante as Rachel Burton
- Brooke Mills as Tracy Davis
- Brenda Sutton as Jody Hawkins
- Johnny Ray McGhee as Carnell Smith
- Bob Harris as Dinwiddie
- John Kramer as Alex Boslick
- Dick Miller as Coach Harris
- James Milhollin as Principal Peters
- Chuck Norris as Karate Advisor

== Production ==
=== Development ===
Roger Corman had achieved success with The Student Nurses, written by Stephanie Rothman and Charles S. Swartz and directed by Rothman. He initially commissioned Rothman to write The Student Teachers, but she left New World Pictures after The Velvet Vampire to work for Dimension Pictures.

Following two successful sequels to The Student Nurses - Private Duty Nurses and Night Call Nurses - Corman decided to expand the concept to teachers. Director Jonathan Kaplan, who had directed Night Call Nurses, recalled: "After Night Call Nurses was done, I didn't talk to him again for a while. Then Julie called me and said, 'We're a big hit in Tallahassee! Roger wants you to come out and make the same movie, but with teachers instead of nurses'."

=== Writing ===
Producer Jon Davison noted that no one who worked on The Student Teachers ever saw the original Rothman/Swartz script. A new script was written by Kaplan and Danny Opatoshu (who had helped write Night Call Nurses), but Corman requested rewrites.

Kaplan later explained his approach to early filmmaking: "When I looked at the filmographies of the directors I admired, I noticed that they made a hell of a lot of movies before they made a good one. And I made the decision consciously to make as many movies as I could in as short a period of time as I could."

=== Filming ===
The film was shot in 15 days for under $100,000, including three days of filming at the Paramount Ranch. According to Davison, Corman removed several jokes from the final chase sequence to play it more seriously.

=== Casting ===
The lead role was originally written for Patti Byrne, who had appeared in Kaplan's Night Call Nurses, but when she did not commit, the role went to Susan Damante. Kaplan's sister, Nora Heflin, and mother, Frances Heflin, appear in the film and share a scene together. Chuck Norris has a small role as the karate advisor.

=== Post-production ===
Producer Jon Davison invited Joe Dante to Los Angeles to edit the film's trailer, which launched Dante's career at New World Pictures.

== Reception ==
=== Box office ===
The Student Teachers was released on May 31, 1973, and earned $1,078,000 in U.S. and Canada rentals, making it one of the most successful films in the nurse/teacher cycle.

=== Critical response ===
The film received mixed reviews from critics. Writing in the Chicago Reader, film critic Dave Kehr described it as "an ugly, exploitative downer," but acknowledged that director Kaplan "puts some infectious high spirits into the incidental action." However, Kehr criticized the film's structure, noting "it seems a shame when the film is forced to stop every 10 or 15 minutes so the three lead actresses can take off their shirts."

DVD Talk critic Tyler Foster was less favorable, calling the film "a slog" and noting that "there's not enough of a connection between teaching and mobsters to justify shoehorning this material into the film."

Filmink argued "Kaplan’s flashy direction holds interest, and Dick Miller is on hand yet again, plus there’s the novelty of seeing a small role played by Chuck Norris. However, we have to confess that we’re not huge fans of this movie: the acting is poor, and it has a very unpleasant rape plot."

Chuck Norris, who had been told the movie was about unconventional teachers, took his karate students to a screening and was surprised by the amount of sex and nudity in the film.

Roger Corman later praised the film, stating it "was one of the best of that series, and it was one of the most successful. I think it proves that if a film is made a little bit better than other films in the genre, it will do better."

=== Marketing influence ===
The film's promotional artwork became a template for later exploitation marketing campaigns. In 1977, the advertising materials for The Student Teachers were borrowed by distributor Jack H. Harris for the re-release of the unrelated 1973 drama The Swinging Teacher (originally titled Just Be There), creating misleading marketing that suggested the film was part of the sexploitation genre despite its serious dramatic content.

== See also ==
- List of American films of 1973
