= Terminal Island (film) =

1973 film by Stephanie Rothman

- Directed by: Stephanie Rothman
- Written by: Stephanie Rothman; Charles S. Swartz; Jack Barrett
- Produced by: Charles S. Swartz executive Lawrence H. Woolner
- Starring: Phyllis Davis; Marta Kristen; Ena Hartman; Don Marshall; Barbara Leigh; Randy Boone; Tom Selleck
- Cinematography: Daniel Lacambre
- Music by: Michael Andres
- Production company: Dimension Pictures
- Distributed by: Dimension Pictures
- Release date: June 1973
- Running time: 88 minutes
- Country: United States
- Language: English
- Budget: $250,000

Terminal Island, released theatrically in the UK as Knuckle Men, is a 1973 American action–drama thriller film directed by Stephanie Rothman. It features early screen performances by Tom Selleck and Roger E. Mosley. Although an exploitation film, it has been treated with much serious discussion by critics and academics over the years. It is regarded as a cult film.

== Plot ==
A TV news program produces a segment on Terminal Island, a prison island established after the U.S. Supreme Court abolished the death penalty. First-degree murderers are incarcerated in the island to serve their sentences and fend for themselves.

Guards take Carmen by boat to Terminal Island and leave as only prisoners are on the island. Her first encounter is the former doctor, Milford, who was sentenced to the island for a mercy killing. She then joins a camp of prisoners where the dominant males are Bobby and Monk. Monk attacks Carmen; no one comes to her aid.

Carmen gets to know the three other women on the island: Lee, a revolutionary; Bunny, who is catatonic; and Joy who is promiscuous. They tell Carmen that her duties will include servicing the sexual needs of the male prisoners and working in the fields. Monk sends Bunny to service Bobby. The male prisoners keep killing each other in fights.

Some male prisoners from another faction on the island, led by AJ and Cornell, kidnap the women. One of the men, Dylan, tries to rape Joy, but is fought off. The women start forming relationships with the men; Carmen forms one with AJ. Joy gets revenge on Dylan by covering him in honey and setting bees to attack him.

Some men from the main group, led by Monk, attack the rebels and kill some but the bulk get away. The rebels plan an assault on the main prisoners, with Lee telling them how to make weapons.

Bunny rejoins the main group of prisoners, and Bobby flogs her by the sea. Bobby uses Bunny to lure some visiting prison guards on to the beach. They are killed, and Bobby and his men take their guns.

The rebels fight the larger group, and a large battle ensues in which men on both sides are killed, including Cornell and Dylan. Bobby and Monk take refuge in a bunker, but the rebels manage to attack it with a firebomb; Bobby is killed and Monk is blinded.

Bunny regains her speech. Dr Milford turns down an opportunity to return to the mainland.

== Cast ==
- Ena Hartman as Carmen
- Phyllis Davis as Joy Land
- Don Marshall as A.J. Thomas
- Marta Kristen as Lee Phillips
- Barbara Leigh as Bunny Campbell
- Randy Boone as "Easy"
- Sean Kenney as Bobby
- Tom Selleck as Dr. Milford
- Roger E. Mosley as "Monk"
- Geoffrey Deuel as Chino
- Ford Clay as Cornell
- Jo Morrow as Newswoman
- Clyde Ventura as Dylan
- Frank Christi as Roy Teale
- James Whitworth as Vander
- Richard Stahl as TV Anchorman
- Sandy Ward as Guard
- Albert Cole as Finney
- Chris Allen as Dana
- Richard Taylor as Newsman
- Ray Saniger as "Red"

== Production ==
=== Development ===
Stephanie Rothman started directing films for Roger Corman at New World Pictures, The Student Nurses and The Velvet Vampire. She and her husband Charles Swartz received an offer from Larry Woolner to join a new company, Dimension Pictures, for which Rothman made Terminal Island. Rothman says Woolner wanted to make a "woman's prison" film, which were popular at the time, e.g. The Big Doll House. She says she and her husband decided to make a film about women and men in prison and Woolner wanted it to have black characters to appeal to the blaxploitation audience.

Rothman turned down the chance to make The Big Doll House for Corman, but agreed to make Terminal Island as "I would be in control of how the subject matter was treated, and while I had to put in the usual elements of sex and violence, I also could introduce ideas about how prisoners were treated, and how they could treat each other, that were not necessarily in these other films. I didn't have to turn it into what most of these other films were, which was a cartoon."

She decided to make it a "Devil's Island picture"; "...we didn't have to shoot it on a set, you know, in a very confined space. To build a set and to rent a stage would be very expensive; shooting it in the outdoors would be much more economical and visually much more interesting."

Rothman said she wanted to make "a story in which a group of men and women needed each other for survival, and therefore could not afford the luxury of stereotyped sex-role behavior.” She added, the film "is not the story of a utopian community built on a bedrock of ideology, but of how a group of antisocial people rediscover their own social needs, needs for companionship and cooperation that exist within us all."

The original script was written by Jim Barnett, whom Rothman and Swartz knew and who had written some prison films. Rothman was unhappy with the draft, saying "His treatment of the women was just unbelievable. I mean they were so passive and so empty." They hired Henry Rosenbaum to rewrite it; Rothman says he "did a very good job" but he elected not to take credit. Rothman and Swartz then did another draft.

The cast included Barbara Leigh, who had been in The Student Nurses for Rothman. Leigh later called Terminal Island "a funny film. I say one line to the Doctor at the very end after they've whipped and tied me to the beach, ‘Take me home.’ So in the end, I talk, which was the greatest part of the film for me."

Rothman did not want all the characters to be killed off because "I don't believe in writing off human beings, no matter how worthless or dislikable they may seem."

Rothman said the film "was the first opportunity I had to deal with major action sequences and a large cast of characters. The majority of the production was shot in the rain, which made production more difficult than normal. But it gave the land a verdant look that is uncharacteristic of Southern California where it was shot."

=== Shooting ===
The movie was shot at Lake Sherwood in Los Angeles. Ena Hartman sprained her ankle early during filming, meaning her role had to be truncated as she was unable to do action scenes.

Rothman later said that she was asked to have a rape scene in the film but could not bring herself to shoot it. "I would not want to be responsible in any way for showing how it could be done", she said. She elaborated:

in a film like Terminal Island [1973], practically the whole film involves violence because the subject matter is violent people. I accepted that. I recognized that if I was going to make films, and I was going to make them for the market, I was making them for it. I wanted to make films very much and that's what I needed to do. What I needed to do was try to refine that and give it some meaning beyond the violence itself, or beyond the nudity itself. In that sense, I tried very hard to not make it exploitative.

The film was originally more violent, but scenes had to be cut out. Rothman was uncomfortable with the violence that she did show. "I was unhappy with the movie and still continue to feel so", she said in 1981.

The film features male nudity. Rothman said: "There is more male nudity in my films than you find in films of most male directors. Eroticism in films has been traditionally concerned with the erotic interests of men while women's interests have usually been ignored. Women have as much interest in men's bodies as men do in women's. As a woman, I naturally take woman's erotic interests into account. Therefore I have male nudity when it seems appropriate."

== Reception ==
Rothman said the film "ultimately... did make money, but initially it did not do that well... it did well in certain cities but not well in others... it may have been the publicity campaign was wrong. It may have been there just wasn't a public interest in that kind of subject matter at the time....I know it sold to Italy and Spain and Mexico and England."

=== Critical ===
The Los Angeles Times said "this slick saga offers enough sadism, sex and violence to divert anyone who gets bored trying to figure out if this film is trying to make a statement about capital punishment, race relations, woman's lib, man's inhumanity or the advantages of living primitively... This tasteless and trashy film has a certain amount of suspense."

Film critic Roger Ebert rated Terminal Island one star out of four, dismissing it as "the kind of movie that can almost be reviewed by watching the trailer."

Dannis Peary called it "the most democratic— and ‘unisexual’—movie in memory: the women and men renegades are interchangeable, sharing in all the action, the danger, the plotting of war strategy. When a woman is making love or conversing with one man, it could just as easily be with another. There are no distinct couples formed in the film."

According to writer Pam Cook, "Like Rothman's other films, Terminal Island includes numerous feminist jokes, many of which depend on role reversal, or on women turning the tables against male aggressors."

Film Trap said Rothman's work is "pure journeyman craftsmanship. She puts the camera down, moves it if need be, and keeps things chugging along. The location is cheap (forest), everyone's costume is the same (a jean ensemble) and the gore simple (bloody stab wounds). The characters are distinct (the mute, the cocky one, the new girl) and they are developed in a way that makes you care if they get killed, without ever wallowing in any of their back stories."

== See also ==
- No Escape

== Sources ==
- Peary, Dannis (1977). "Stephanie Rothman R-rated Feminist". In Kay, Karyn; Peary, Gerald (eds.). Women and the cinema : a critical anthology. pp. 179–192. ISBN 978-0-525-47459-3.
