= Blood Bath =

1966 American horror film by Stephanie Rothman and Jack Hill

- US theatrical release poster
- Directed by: Jack Hill; Stephanie Rothman; Radoš Novaković (Note: Original Operation: Titian footage, uncredited.)
- Written by: Jack Hill; Stephanie Rothman
- Produced by: Jack Hill
- Starring: William Campbell; Linda Saunders; Marissa Mathes
- Cinematography: Alfred Taylor
- Edited by: Candace Kane
- Music by: Ronald Stein
- Production company: Jack Hill Productions
- Distributed by: American International Pictures
- Release date: March 2, 1966
- Running time: 69 minutes
- Country: United States
- Language: English

Blood Bath is a 1966 American horror film directed by Jack Hill and Stephanie Rothman, and starring William Campbell, Linda Saunders, Marissa Mathes, and Sid Haig. The film concerns a mad painter of macabre art who turns into a vampire-like man (with different features) by night, apparently as a result of a family curse, and believes that he has found his reincarnated mistress in the person of an avant-garde ballerina.

Blood Bath had a complex and troubled production history, marked by various cuts and reshoots. In 1963, Roger Corman had co-produced a Yugoslavia-made spy thriller called Operation: Titian, but the film was deemed unreleasable. Corman purchased the rights to another film and assigned writer-director Jack Hill to write a new script. This time, it was a horror film that incorporated the previous footage from Operation: Titian. Hill wrote and directed numerous horror sequences that were edited into the film, and it was re-titled Portrait in Terror. Still unsatisfied with the completed product, Corman hired Stephanie Rothman to film additional sequences that were also added. This cobbled-together feature was given a brief theatrical release by American International Pictures under the title Blood Bath, with screenplay and directorial credit jointly shared by Hill and Rothman. An additional version of the film was made for television and re-titled Track of the Vampire.

== Plot ==
In an unidentified locale, art student and model Daisy leaves a club alone after having an argument with her beatnik boyfriend Max. Walking through the deserted streets, she stops to admire some gruesome paintings in a gallery window painted by artist Antonio Sordi, who coincidentally also comes by to look in on his "lost children." After a friendly conversation, they return to Sordi's studio in a room beneath an old bell tower, where Sordi convinces the young woman to pose for him. There, however, Sordi is possessed by the spirit of a long-dead ancestor and suddenly transforms into a vampiric monster who hacks the screaming Daisy to death with a cleaver, then lowers her mutilated corpse into a vat of boiling substance.

In his vampiric form, Sordi has already killed a lone woman in the town square, then taken her to a nearby car and feigned kissing her so that a pair of oncoming pedestrians assumed they were just lovers sharing an intimate moment. Another victim is approached at a party, chased into a swimming pool, and drowned there after the other guests have moved into the house. The murdered women are carried back to Sordi's studio and painted by the artist, their bodies then covered in wax. Because his vampiric self looks facially nothing like Sordi, no one connects him with the rash of murders.

Max wants to make up with Daisy but cannot find her anywhere. After recognizing her as the model in Sordi's painting of her, which is now on display at a local beatnik cafe, he goes to see her sister, Donna. Donna tells Max she has not seen Daisy for days, and is concerned about the recent rash of disappearances. She reads Max the legend of Sordi's 15th-century ancestor Erno, a painter condemned to be burned at the stake for capturing his subjects' souls on canvas and being a vampire. Unable to convince Max that Antonio Sordi might also be a vampire, she confronts the artist at his studio and asks him if he has seen Daisy. He angrily brushes her off. That night, he later follows her through the streets and murders her as she tries to escape from him on a carousel.

The "human" Sordi is in love with Dorian, an avant-garde ballerina, Daisy's former roommate and a lookalike for both Donna and a former love, Meliza, the loss of whom may have driven him mad. At first he tries to protect her from his vampiric tendencies, warning her his studio is a cheerless place and at one point breaking a date with her to spend time gaining control of himself after murdering Daisy. But one day at the beach, she reveals her attraction to him and asks him to make love to her. He tries, but panics and runs away. As Dorian leaves the beach, she then is approached by the vampiric Sordi, who chases her back to town, where she is rescued by Max and two of his beatnik friends. They pursue the vampire while Dorian, shaken, and unaware the vampire is really Sordi, proceeds to the bell tower to find out why he fled from her.

Sordi returns and finds Dorian in his studio. He madly enmeshes her in some netting, then comes at her with a knife, apparently believing she is really Meliza. But before he can harm her, numerous wax figures on the floor of the studio begin to move, come alive, and kill him. Max and his friends arrive, break in, and free Dorian.

== Cast ==
- William Campbell as Antonio Sordi
  - Jim Begg as vampire Sordi (uncredited)
- Karl Schanzer as Max
- Lori Saunders as Dorian / Meliza
- Sandra Knight as Donna Allen
- Marissa Mathes as Daisy Allen
- Sid Haig as tall beatnik
- Jonathan Haze as beatnik
- Fred Thompson as beatnik
- Biff Elliot as cafe manager
- David Ackles as carousel operator

Actors who appeared in the original Operation: Titian footage, but are uncredited in the final film, include:

- Patrick Magee
- Rade Marković
- Miha Baloh
- Eric Pohlmann
- Dragomir Felba
- Tomanija Đuričko

== Production ==
=== Operation: Titian ===
In 1963, while on vacation in Europe, Roger Corman made a $20,000 deal to distribute an as-yet unproduced Yugoslavian espionage thriller titled Operacija Ticijan (English: "Operation: Titian"). Corman also insisted on involvement in the production to ensure it could be adequately "Americanized", and provided two well-known English-speaking cast members, William Campbell and Patrick Magee for lead roles. In addition, Francis Ford Coppola, then fresh out of film school and formerly associated with Corman in the Americanization of Nebo Zovyot (into Battle Beyond the Sun), was installed as the production's script supervisor.

Unfortunately, the completed film was deemed unreleasable by Corman, although a redubbed, slightly re-edited version would eventually be released directly to television under the title Portrait in Terror.

=== Reconception as Blood Bath: Jack Hill ===
Meanwhile, in 1964, Corman asked director Jack Hill to salvage the film. Hill wrote numerous new principal scenes, and filmed them in Venice, California, in order to match the original movie's European look, and turned the former spy thriller into a horror movie about a crazed madman who kills his models and makes sculptures out of their dead bodies. Campbell was available for the reshoots but insisted on a sizeable paycheck to appear in the film, reportedly angering Corman, who nonetheless agreed to the actor's demands. Hill added all of the beatnik-related scenes shot with Sid Haig and Jonathan Haze, and was responsible for what many fans believe is the single most effective sequence in the film, the hatchet murder of Marissa Mathes's character. Magee's role was more or less retained intact in this version. However, the resulting film, now titled Blood Bath, was not released, as Corman once again was unhappy with the results.

=== Stephanie Rothman ===
In 1966, Corman made another attempt to create a workable film from the footage already shot. He hired another director, Stephanie Rothman, to change the story as she saw fit.

While retaining much of Hill's material, she changed the plot from a story about a deranged, murderous artist to a story about a deranged, murderous artist who is also a vampire. Because Campbell refused to participate in yet another reshoot, Rothman was forced to use a completely different actor for the new vampire scenes. This meant Rothman now had to provide the Campbell character with the ability to magically transform his physical shape whenever he turned into a vampire, in order to explain why the vampire-killer looked nothing like Campbell. Other complications including bringing Sid Haig back for re-shoots; at the time of shooting with Hill, he did not have a beard, but had grown one for the subsequent project he was working on. This explains the continuity errors concerning his facial hair in the film. Patrick Magee's role was reduced to a brief appearance (uncredited) in a flashback.

The identity of the actor playing the vampire was long unknown (he is uncredited in all available prints of the film), but is identified in a production still as Jim Begg, a character actor-turned-producer who later appeared in Rothman's It's a Bikini World (1967).

In spite of the inconsistencies in the finished product's plot, created by Rothman's new ideas, and the fact that the two principle female characters are played by actresses who look remarkably alike, this was this version of the film that most pleased Corman, and it was subsequently released to theatres by American International Pictures (AIP), retaining Hill's Blood Bath title. Both Hill and Rothman were credited as co-directors. Hill later claimed that Rothman's changes "totally ruined" the film.

A fifth version of the film exists, entitled Track of the Vampire. Because Rothman's Blood Bath ran 62 minutes, which was deemed too short for television showings, further footage was filmed, including a six-minute sequence showing Linda Saunders dancing non-stop on the beach. This version of the film was shown often on late-night television.

Commenting on the film's convoluted history, Hill stated:

Blood Bath was my script. It was my title. After I left, Roger decided that he didn't think that the Yugoslavian footage matched the footage that we had shot in Venice. You see, both Portrait of Terror and Blood Bath came out of this same footage. Roger got the idea that he could sell the original movie to television and have Stephanie Rothman pad out what I shot with further scenes to make another full-length movie—and wind up with two movies instead of one. This is the kind of nutso stuff that went through there. So Stephanie wrote new scenes and shot them, and turned it into a vampire movie.

== Release ==
Blood Bath debuted in cinemas in March 1966 through AIP, and was screened as a double feature with Queen of Blood (1966), written and directed by Curtis Harrington and co-produced by Rothman.

=== Home media ===
The film was released on DVD in 2011 through Metro-Goldwyn-Mayer's "Limited Edition Collection," which are made-on-demand discs. In May 2016, the film was released on Blu-ray in a limited edition two-disc set by Arrow Films. It features four versions of the film restored from the original negatives: the original Operation: Titian; Portrait in Terror; Blood Bath featuring Stephanie Rothman's re-shoots; and Track of the Vampire. Hill's version of Blood Bath seems to be lost.

=== Critical response ===
Michael Weldon, in his Psychotronic Encyclopedia of Film, called Blood Bath “a confusing but interesting horror film with an even more confusing history". Phil Hardy's The Aurum Film Encyclopedia: Horror noted, “Cheap and crude, with echoes of a dozen movies ranging from Mystery of the Wax Museum (1933) to A Bucket of Blood (1959), this film isn't unenjoyable." Cavett Binion of AllMovie wrote, "As one might imagine, this is pretty difficult to follow, but there are some good performances — particularly from William Campbell as the haunted shutterbug — and some fairly suspenseful scenes."

In 1991, Video Watchdog magazine devoted lengthy articles in three separate issues fully detailing the production history of the film. These articles included interviews with Hill and Campbell, the latter of whom expressed shock when he was told that the film he had shot so long ago in Yugoslavia had been turned into five individual movies.

Clayton Dillard of Slant Magazine awarded the film four out of five stars, writing: "Purely as a film, Blood Bath expectedly turns out to be a mash-up of styles and tones, with surrealist flourishes (a tracking shot focused on Sordi in the wide-open California desert) juxtaposing routine scenes of women being lured to the villain's lair. Everything within it is odd, from rampant continuity errors, to unintelligible footage of shadowy figures from the preceding films interspersed throughout."

== See also ==
- Vampire film

== Sources ==
- Creed, Barbara (1993). The Monstrous-Feminine: Film, Feminism, Psychoanalysis (1 ed.). New York: Routledge. ISBN 978-0-415-05259-7.
- Dixon, Wheeler Winston (2007). Film Talk: Directors at Work. Rutgers, New Jersey: Rutgers University Press. ISBN 978-0-813-54147-1.
- Horwath, Alexander; Elsaesser, Thomas; King, Noel, eds. (2005). The Last Great American Picture Show: New Hollywood Cinema in the 1970s. Amsterdam: Amsterdam University Press. ISBN 978-9-053-56631-2.
- Lucas, Tim (1990). "The Trouble with Titan Part Two". Video Watchdog. No. 5. pp. 23–31.
- Lucas, Tim (1991). "The Trouble with Titan Part Three". Video Watchdog. No. 7. pp. 19–28.
- Weldon, Michael (1983). The Psychotronic Encyclopedia of Film. New York: Ballantine Books. ISBN 978-0-345-34345-1.
