= Group Marriage =

1973 film by Stephanie Rothman

- Theatrical release poster
- Directed by: Stephanie Rothman
- Written by: Richard Walter; Charles S. Swartz; Stephanie Rothman
- Produced by: Charles S. Swartz
- Starring: Victoria Vetri; Aimée Eccles; Solomon Sturges; Claudia Jennings; Zack Taylor; Jeffrey Pomerantz; Milt Kamen
- Cinematography: Daniel Lacambre
- Edited by: John O'Connor; Kirby Timmons
- Music by: Michael Andres
- Production company: Dimension Pictures
- Distributed by: Dimension Pictures
- Release date: July 28, 1972
- Running time: 82 minutes
- Country: United States
- Language: English

Group Marriage is a 1972 American sex comedy film co-written and directed by Stephanie Rothman. It was the first film she made for Dimension Pictures, a company in which she was a minor shareholder with her husband Charles Swartz along with Larry Woolner.

== Plot ==
A young woman named Chris works at a Los Angeles car rental agency alongside her friend Judy. She constantly bickers with her live-in boyfriend Sandor, who writes bumper sticker slogans. Chris meets probation officer Dennis when both try to get into the same two-seater car before she and Sandor give him a ride. Dennis ends up refereeing an argument between Sandor and Chris, which results in Chris accidentally kicking Dennis in the groin. They invite Dennis to spend the night at their house in Santa Monica. During the night, Chris gets into bed with Dennis and has sex with him.

The next morning, Sandor discovers Chris and Dennis together in bed. Chris insists she still loves Sandor but likes Dennis too, arguing that she can care for more than one person. Sandor is initially annoyed but eventually calms down. In the interest of fairness, Dennis invites Chris and Sandor to dinner with his girlfriend Jan, a former stewardess. Jan and Sandor are clearly attracted to each other and end up in bed, alongside Chris and Dennis, although Chris struggles with jealousy. Pretending that she needs to watch the TV to sleep, Chris interrupts Jan and Sandor's efforts to have sex. The next day, Chris confesses to Sandor that she was afraid of losing him, but she starts to feel comfortable with the idea of sharing sexual partners.

Meanwhile, Dennis gets Ramon, one of his parolees who constantly gets into brawls, a job with Chris and Judy at the car rental agency. While the couples are having a picnic on the beach, Jan meets lifeguard Phil, whom she introduces to the others. When Phil reveals he is in the middle of a divorce and has no place to live, the women invite him to move in with them. Phil suggests bringing a third woman into the household and invites in Elaine, a lawyer he meets while jogging. Tensions arise between Phil and Elaine when he discovers she is his ex-wife's divorce attorney. However, the two resolve their differences after realizing how much they like each other.

Their "group marriage" attracts media attention and criticism after they are interviewed by a news crew, who unsuccessfully attempts to coax them into admitting that they engage in illegal sex acts. Chris announces she is pregnant, although she is unsure who the father is. While most of the group is open to the idea of a child, Jan privately expresses her discontent to Elaine. One day, the group returns home to find their house vandalized, and shortly afterwards, their front yard and car are firebombed by a gang of hoodlums who disapprove of their lifestyle. Elaine defiantly suggests they all get officially married as a group.

When Phil discovers that Jan has been having sex with a man outside the group, the other members feel betrayed. Declaring that she needs to be free, Jan leaves the group amicably. Some time later, Jan attends the wedding between a heavily pregnant Chris, Elaine, Sander, Phil, Denis, and new member Judy, which takes place in their backyard. Their gay friends and next-door neighbors Randy and Rodney also marry each other. After the ceremony and brief reception, the police arrest the group.

== Cast ==
- Victoria Vetri as Jan
- Aimée Eccles as Chris. Rothman said, "She had this impish quality and she had this sort of sparkling manner that I thought made her very right for a comedy. I also liked the idea that it was nontraditional casting at that time, having someone whose features were Asian play the leading lady."
- Solomon Sturges as Sander. Sturges was the son of Preston Sturges and Rothman said, "He was so good. He really had a firm grasp of the character, and he enhanced the role."
- Claudia Jennings as Elaine
- Zack Taylor as Phil
- Jeffrey Pomerantz as Dennis. Rothman recalled, "he kept on trying to suddenly, in a scene, inject business that would ... throw the cameraman" and "try to upstage people by grimacing at a certain time. He was just a problem, a nuisance, and one of the ways I solved that was to use him in fewer scenes."
- Norman Bartold as Findley
- John McMurtry as Randy
- Pepe Serna as Ramon
- Bill Striglos as Rodney
- Jayne Kennedy as Judy
- Jack Bernardi as father
- Milt Kamen as justice of the peace
- Ron Gans as interviewer

== Production ==
According to Rothman, Larry Woolner, who ran Dimension, "wanted me to make a sexy film, and I tried to think of how I could do that and anchor it in something that said something about sexual mores." She was reading a book Future Shock which included discussion of group marriage and thought that "might be a wonderful framework in which to create a sex comedy that said something about the temperaments of the people involved, their goals, the social pitfalls of trying to do something like this in a society where it's neither legal nor admired particularly.”

Rothman was determined to handle the topic "in a way that was not sordid and sleazy" but rather "humorous and pithy and imaginative... my intention at least was to make something that was a surprise."

"I was trying to make a bedroom farce," she said. Rothman admired that genre because "I like the fact that it's very dynamic, things are always happening in it. The humor is fast and furious. The people are put in extreme situations and must devise ways to get out of them." (She had even acted in a production of Georges Feydeau's Hotel Paradiso.)

She gave the characters different jobs because she "wanted a mix of people who... could draw on their work experience in some way that would affect the common life experience that they shared during the time of the story."

The film was announced in January 1972 and shot later that year in and around Los Angeles and Santa Monica, California. Rothman said, "I like comedy best of all and Group Marriage was the first chance I had to do an outright comedy. Unlike The Velvet Vampire, it didn't go under the guise of being something else."

Rothman later worked with Solomon Sturges on The Working Girls.

Like The Student Nurses, the film featured a number of montages. Rothman later said:

The way I was making films at that time, in the amount of days I had to shoot in, it was a shorthand way of showing a certain quality of theirs, without dialogue. Which filled up time, to be very honest with you, that would make the film long enough to be feature length. Because in the amount of time I had to shoot, dialogue always takes more time to shoot than scenes that you can shoot without synchronized sound, and so I needed a certain number of those in every film. I had to carefully choose where to put thosescenes, so that they did advance the story and tell you something about the character, but at the same time allowed me to not use synchronized sound.

== Music ==
The song "Darling Companion" which plays over the opening credits was written and performed by John Sebastian.

== Critical reception ==
According to Rothman, the film was received "very positively".

The Boston Phoenix called it an "extraordinary comedy... this gem of a picture is well worth the search... that true rarity, a sexy comedy. Considering how quite difficult it is to make a sensuous picture to begin with, and noting how few deft comedy directors have emerged over the past twenty years, one would have to admire director Stephanie Rothman for her technical facility alone."

A writer in The Gazette called it "a good example of what enlightened erotica can be like. It features female characters who are professionally and sexually assertive – but not intimidating. They are capable of making decisions for themselves, yet they're still able to love the men in their lives and be loved in return."

Shock Magazine said "at its core the flick doesn't know what it wants to be. At times it's a Free Love forum pocked with messages on the “failure to communicate”. Other times it's your standard, leering sex farce. Then odd, unnecessary subplots intrude, like one guy's melodramatic job as a probation officer. And though the filmmakers obviously thought they were on the cutting edge, with all four leads in bed together, smoking grass, they never shed the old morality horseshit. Under its mod surface, it's simple, romantic pabulum, swaddled in the latest trendiness, Ignoring all the comic possibilities in favor of generic, self-serious fodder."

Dannis Peary later wrote:

If Group Marriage has a real weakness, it is that it tries to be daringly topical, even though the subject of “group marriage” seems more unusual than shocking. The violence that ensues when the angry public hears about their living arrangement is a little absurd. If the film has a real strength, it is that all the protagonists are as gentle as they are. It is certainly not typical of movie romances to have so many characters liking each other for an entire film when things are going on that would make everyday people despise one another.

According to Henry Jenkins, "This farcical film proposes a radical reconstruction of family relations and traces the process by which the various characters overcome their jealousies and find happiness in communal relations."

== See also ==
- List of American films of 1973
