= Ron Gans =

American actor (1931–2010)

- Born: Ronald Kenneth Gans; August 9, 1931; Chicago, Illinois, U.S.
- Died: June 29, 2010 (aged 78); Los Angeles, California, U.S.
- Occupations: Actor; voice-over artist
- Years active: 1950–1990
- Spouse: Theresa Gans
- Children: 2

Ronald Kenneth Gans (August 9, 1931 – June 29, 2010), sometimes credited as Ron Kennedy, was an American character actor and voice-over artist, known for portraying Q.T. the Orangutan on The Disney Channel's Dumbo's Circus, the voice of Armus in Star Trek: The Next Generation, the voice of Eeyore on Welcome to Pooh Corner, and the voice of the Spider in The Mother Goose Video Treasury.

== Career ==
Gans also voiced the Stunticon Drag Strip in The Transformers. His work as a character actor, billed as "Ron Kennedy," includes the Perry Mason episode "The Case of the Traveling Treasure," first aired on CBS on November 4, 1961, and the Straightaway episode "Pledge a Nightmare," first aired on ABC on December 1, 1961.

== Personal life ==
Gans was married to Theresa Gans, together they had two children.

== Death ==
Gans died in Los Angeles at the age of 78, due to complications from pneumonia.

== Filmography ==
=== Television ===
Year	Title	Role	Notes
1961-1965	Perry Mason	Ben Wylie; Joe Velvet; Male Nurse	Credited as "Ron Kennedy"
1983-1985	Welcome to Pooh Corner	Eeyore	Credited, Voice
1985-1986	Dumbo's Circus	Q.T. Others	Credited, Voice
1985	Hulk Hogan's Rock 'n' Wrestling	Nikolai Volkoff	Voice
1985-1986	The Transformers	Drag Strip; Sharkticon	Credited, Voice
1987	The Mother Goose Video Treasury	Spider	Credited, Voice
1987-1994	Star Trek: The Next Generation	Armus	Credited, Voice
1989	X-Men: Pryde of the X-Men	Juggernaut	Pilot, Voice
1990	The Real Ghostbusters	Karro Zans	Episode: "Ghostworld" (voice)

=== Films ===
Year	Title	Role	Notes
1950	Hot Rod	Minor Role	Uncredited
1953	The Moonlighter	Minor Role	Uncredited
1953	Appointment in Honduras	Mexican Lieutenant	Uncredited
1954	Killers from Space	Sergeant Powers, Sentry	
1956	Hidden Guns	Burt Miller	
1956	Tea and Sympathy	Dick	Uncredited
1957	Operation Mad Ball	Tinneman	Uncredited
1959	High School Big Shot	Unknown	
1960	Battle of Blood Island	Ken	
1960	Spring Affair	Ted	
1965	The Girls on the Beach	Master of Ceremonies	Uncredited
1965	Harlow	Assistant Director	
1966	Mondo Keyhole	Vampire	Uncredited
1967	The St. Valentine's Day Massacre	Chapman	Uncredited
1968	The Wild Racers	Unknown	
1968	Tarzan and the Jungle Boy	Ken	
1969	The Gay Deceivers	Freddie	
1970	The Student Nurses	Psychiatrist	
1970	The Curious Female	Jerome Bruce	
1971	Sexual Liberty Now	The Narrator	Voice
1972	Runaway, Runaway	The Attacker	
1972	Night Call Nurses	Radio newscaster	Voice, Uncredited
1972	The Thing with Two Heads	Reporter In Tan Coat	Uncredited
1972	Bonnie's Kids	Radio Newscaster	Voice
1973	Group Marriage	The Interviewer	
1973	Coffy	The Stranger	
1974	Sex Freaks	The Narrator	Voice, Uncredited
1975	Carnal Madness	Newscaster	
1976	Revenge of the Cheerleaders	Cooking Lesson	Voice
1976	Hollywood Boulevard	Documentary Narrator	Voice, Uncredited
1976	The Smurfs and the Magic Flute	Earl Flatbroke	1983 US version, Voice
1977	The Kentucky Fried Movie	Unknown	Voice
1978	Deathsport	The Narrator	Voice, Uncredited
1981	Unico	God	English version, Voice, Uncredited
1981	S.O.B.	Television Newscaster	Voice, Uncredited
1981	Hell Night	The Driver	
1981	Heartbeeps	Crimebuster	Voice
1982	The Seduction	The Announcer	Uncredited
1983	Uniko: Mahô no shima e	Cheri's Father / Trojan Horse	English version, Voice, Uncredited
1984	Ringing Bell	Narrator	English, Voice
1988	Not of This Earth	Radio Movie Spot Announcer	Voice, Uncredited
