= Sandy Ward =

American actor (1926–2005)

- Publicity Photo of Sandy Ward
- Born: Gerald Brown; July 12, 1926; Alamosa, Colorado, U.S.
- Died: March 6, 2005 (aged 78); Orange County, California, U.S.
- Occupations: Film and television actor
- Years active: 1967–2003
- Spouse: Irene Krinsky-Ward
- Children: 2

Sandy Ward (July 12, 1926 – March 6, 2005) was an American film and television actor. He was best known for playing the recurring role of Logger Pete on 11 episodes of the American sitcom television series Malcolm in the Middle.

== Life and career ==
Ward was born in Alamosa, Colorado. He began his career in 1967 with an appearance in the crime drama television series Ironside. Ward later guest-starred in television programs including JAG, The Six Million Dollar Man, The F.B.I., Hawkins,The Rockford Files, Cagney & Lacey, Hill Street Blues, Trapper John, M.D., St. Elsewhere, Jake and the Fatman, Murder, She Wrote, Simon & Simon, Hart to Hart, The Hardy Boys/Nancy Drew Mysteries, The Fall Guy, Hardcastle and McCormick, The A-Team, The Dukes of Hazzard, Family Ties, The Greatest American Hero and Night Court.

In his film career, Ward starred in the 1971 film The Velvet Vampire, where he played Amos. He played Detective Grunberger in the 1975 film The Hindenburg. He appeared in films such as Being There, Cornbread, Earl and Me, Earthquake, Wholly Moses!, Movers & Shakers, Switchback, Executive Action, Terminal Island, The Rose, Lightning Jack, The Onion Field, Delta Force 3: The Killing Game, Under Siege and Airplane II: The Sequel. He played Colonel Maxwell in the 1982 film Some Kind of Hero, and Sistrunk in Police Academy 2: Their First Assignment.

In 1983, Ward played Sheriff George Bannerman in the film Cujo. He co-starred as General Hubik in the 1984 film Tank. He played Jeb Ames on five episodes in the soap opera television series Dallas. After that, he played the role of Detective Roy Banks in The Bold and the Beautiful. He starred in the 1990 film Blue Desert, where he played Walter. He also played Quentin in the 2000 film The Perfect Storm, and Hank in the short film Hank & Edgar. His final film credit was for the 2003 film Finding Home. He played the recurring role of Logger Pete in the sitcom television series Malcolm in the Middle, and Pop Lazzari in Seinfeld.

== Death ==
Ward died in March 2005 in Orange County, California, at the age of 78.

== Filmography ==
| Year | Title | Role | Notes |
|---|---|---|---|
| 1971 | The Velvet Vampire | Amos | |
| 1973 | Terminal Island | Guard | |
| 1973 | Executive Action | Policeman | |
| 1974 | Earthquake | Studio Guard | Scenes Deleted |
| 1975 | Cornbread, Earl and Me | Store Manager | |
| 1975 | The Hindenburg | Detective Grunberger | |
| 1978 | F.I.S.T. | The Man | |
| 1978 | Ruby and Oswald | Police Chief Jesse Curry | TV film |
| 1979 | The Onion Field | Pawnbroker | |
| 1979 | The Rose | Rose's Father | |
| 1979 | Being There | Senator Slipshod | |
| 1980 | Wholly Moses! | Taskmaster | |
| 1982 | Some Kind of Hero | Colonel Maxwell | |
| 1982 | Fast-Walking | Warden | |
| 1982 | Airplane II: The Sequel | Defense Attorney | |
| 1983 | Cujo | George Bannerman | |
| 1984 | Tank | General Hubik | |
| 1985 | Police Academy 2: Their First Assignment | Sistrunk | |
| 1985 | Movers & Shakers | Doctor | |
| 1990 | Blue Desert | Walter | |
| 1991 | Delta Force 3: The Killing Game | General Wilson | |
| 1992 | Who Killed the Baby Jesus | Kirk Vaughn | |
| 1992 | Under Siege | Calaway | |
| 1994 | Lightning Jack | Judge Curren | |
| 1997 | Switchback | Tex | |
| 2000 | The Perfect Storm | Quentin (The Old Timer) | |
| 2003 | Finding Home | Julian the Lobsterman | (final film role) |
