= Barbara Leigh =

American actress

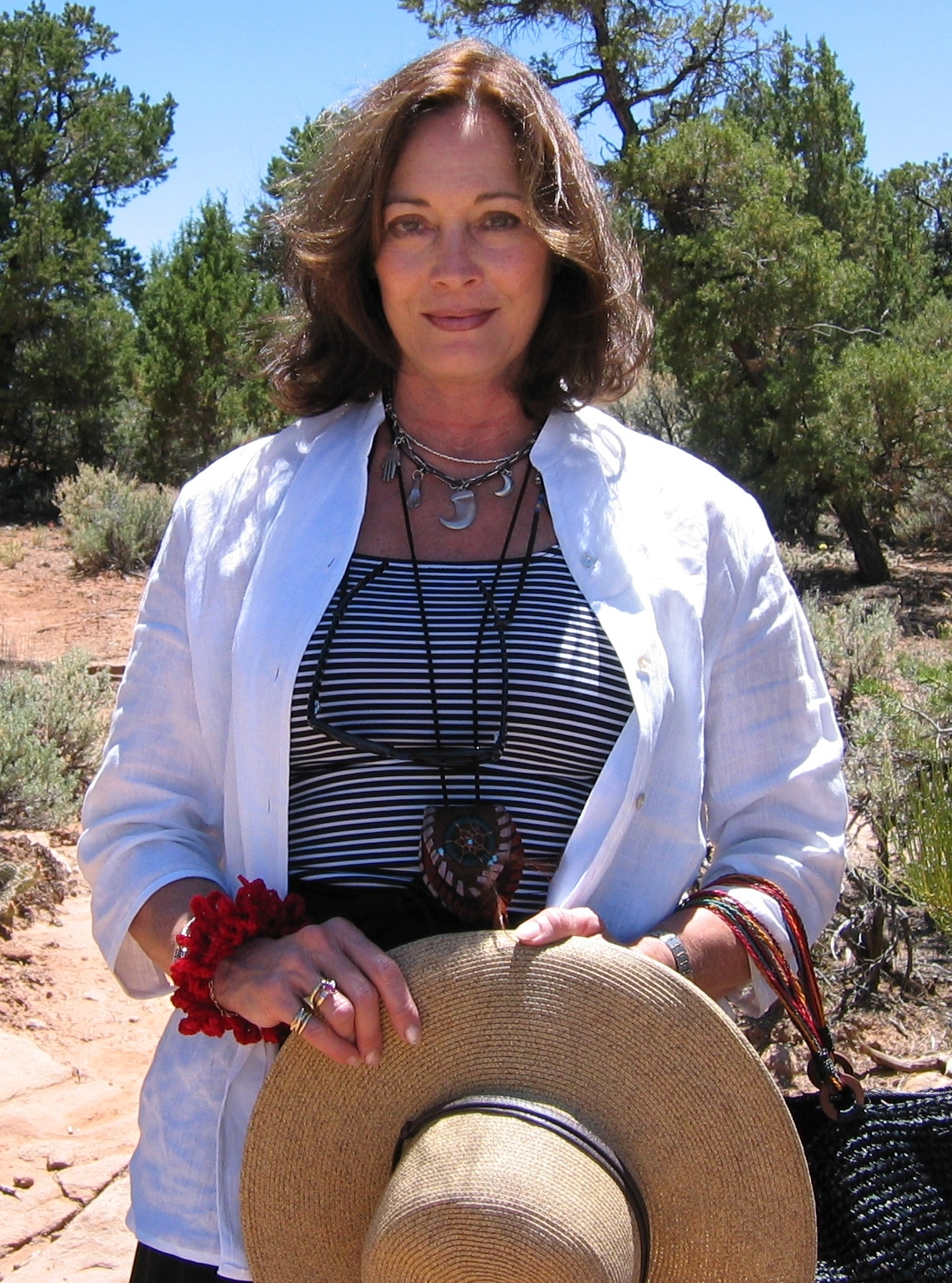
- Leigh in 2004
- Born: Barbara Ann Kish; November 16, 1946 (age 79); Ringgold, Georgia, U.S.
- Occupations: Actress, model
- Years active: 1969–1979
- Known for: The Student Nurses; Pretty Maids All in a Row
- Spouse: Joe Lewis (m. 1975–1977)
- Children: Gerry Haynes (1964–1994)

Barbara Leigh (born Barbara Ann Kish; November 16, 1946) is a former American actress and fashion model. Her breakthrough role came in 1972 with the film Junior Bonner, in which she starred alongside her then-boyfriend Steve McQueen. She became the first model to wear the Vampirella costume on the cover of the original Warren Publishing Vampirella magazine, #67 (March 1978).

== Early life ==
Barbara Leigh was born in Ringgold, Georgia. Leigh married at age 15. At the age of 17, she gave birth to her first son, Finley Gerald "Gerry" Haynes Jr. on July 8, 1964, in Tennessee. He died on February 20, 1994, in Riverside, California at age 29. Her second child Tony Haynes was born in 1967 and died a few hours after he was born.

== Career ==
She starred in two films for director Stephanie Rothman, The Student Nurses and Terminal Island.

In 2002, she published a memoir titled The King, McQueen, and The Love Machine (ISBN 1401038859), which accounts for her romances with McQueen, Elvis Presley, and Jim Aubrey in the early 1970s.

In January 2014, Leigh retired from Playboy Enterprises Inc. after working with the company for almost 17 years.

She developed hyperthyroidism (Graves' disease) and has been a spokeswoman for the National Graves' Disease Foundation.

== Filmography ==
Year	Title	Role	Notes
1969	The Ballad of Andy Crocker	Mia	ABC Movie of the Week
1970	The Most Deadly Game	Karen	TV series: 1 Episode
1970	The Student Nurses	Priscilla	
1971	Pretty Maids All in a Row	Jean McDrew	
1971	The Christian Licorice Store	1st Starlet	
1972	Junior Bonner	Charmagne	
1973	Terminal Island	Bunny	
1973	The President's Plane is Missing	WAF	TV movie
1974	Smile Jenny, You’re Dead	Mildred	TV movie
1975	Boss Nigger	Miss Pruitt	
1975	Baretta	Karen Dennsion	TV series: 1 Episode
1975	Harry O	Gina	TV series: 2 episodes
1978	The Rockford Files	Sylvia	TV series: 1 Episode
1978	CHiPs	Paula	TV series: 1 Episode
1978	The Incredible Hulk	June Tobey	TV series: 1 Episode
1979	Swim Team	Mrs. Mandrake, the Biorhythms Coach	
1979	Seven	Alexa	
1979	Mistress of the Apes	Laura	
