= Miami Blues =

1990 film by George Armitage

- Theatrical release poster
- Directed by: George Armitage
- Screenplay by: George Armitage
- Based on: Miami Blues by Charles Willeford
- Produced by: Jonathan Demme; Gary Goetzman
- Starring: Fred Ward; Alec Baldwin; Jennifer Jason Leigh
- Cinematography: Tak Fujimoto
- Edited by: Craig McKay
- Music by: Gary Chang
- Production company: Tristes Tropiques
- Distributed by: Orion Pictures
- Release date: April 20, 1990
- Running time: 97 minutes
- Country: United States
- Language: English
- Budget: $11 million
- Box office: $9.9 million (US and Canada)

Miami Blues is a 1990 American neo-noir black comedy crime drama film written and directed by George Armitage, based on the 1984 novel of the same name by Charles Willeford. It stars Fred Ward (who also served as an executive producer), Alec Baldwin, and Jennifer Jason Leigh.

== Plot ==
Frederick J. Frenger Jr. (who asks to be called "Junior"), a violent sociopath and self-described thief who "steals from other thieves", is recently released from a California prison, and starts a new life in Miami. Before leaving the airport, he steals a stranger's luggage and unintentionally kills a Hare Krishna by breaking his index finger. Junior checks into a hotel and hooks up with Susie Waggoner, a naive part-time prostitute who is a student at a community college. They become romantically involved and move into a house together, with Susie blissfully unaware of Junior's criminal activities and harboring fantasies of living happily ever after.

Later, while Susie is taking a bath and writing a haiku, Junior decides to break into a nearby apartment. He steals an IMI Desert Eagle handgun, a coin collection and some pork chops. As he is doing this, he speaks aloud a haiku of his own: "Breaking, entering. The dark and lonely places. Finding a big gun."

An investigation of the Hare Krishna murder leads grizzled policeman Sgt. Hoke Moseley to come knocking on their door. Moseley shares a home-cooked dinner with the couple, upon Susie's suggestion, and plays it cool while seemingly indicating to Junior that he is on to him. He overtly suspects Junior has been in prison and wants him to come to the police station for a lineup. In response, Junior goes to Moseley's home the next day, assaults him and steals his gun, badge and dentures. Junior begins using the badge, impersonating a police officer by breaking up robberies, hold-ups, and other criminal solicitations only to keep the loot for himself or demanding bribes as rewards afterward.

While at a convenience store, Junior witnesses an armed robbery and decides to break it up. He lectures the gunman about avoiding a life of crime, but the gunman runs a truck over him. Junior complains to Susie that the "straight life" has made him too soft. Moseley tracks down the couple through a utility account opened up in Susie's name. He pretends to run into her at the grocery store, where they swap recipes. After she lies that she has left Junior, Moseley tells her that Junior is a murderer and that he and the police are looking for him.

Back home, to test whether he will lie to her, Susie deliberately ruins a pie by putting an excessive amount of vinegar in it. To her disappointment, Junior compliments the dessert and eats it with gusto, though his face gives it away somewhat. The next day, Junior asks Susie to drive him around town on errands. Their first stop is a pawn shop, which he robs. In the course of the robbery, Junior kills the pawnbroker's bodyguard and seriously injures her, but not before she chops several of his fingers off.

Badly injured, Junior limps to the car, but Susie drives away upon realizing what he has done. Moseley pursues him to the house, where he shoots and kills Junior in self-defense. Being ironic with his last words, Junior tells Moseley, "Susie's gonna get you, Sarge." Susie then arrives and Moseley asks why she stayed with him for so long. She explains that he was kind to her, ate everything she ever cooked and never hit her.

== Cast ==
- Fred Ward as Sgt. Hoke Moseley
- Alec Baldwin as Frederick J. Frenger Jr.
- Jennifer Jason Leigh as Susie Waggoner
- Nora Dunn as Ellita Sánchez
- Charles Napier as Sgt. Bill Henderson
- Shirley Stoler as Edie Wulgemuth
- Bobo Lewis as Edna Damrosch
- Obba Babatundé as Blink Willie
- Gary Klar as head bookie
- José Pérez as Pablo
- Paul Gleason as Sgt. Frank Lackley

== Production ==
The film was the first feature directed by George Armitage in over a decade. He later recalled:

Bill Horberg, who was associate producer, brought the book to Fred [Ward], and Fred said: "Oh, this is great." I don't know if Bill had money or not to option the book, but Fred did, and he optioned it. He brought it to Jonathan [Demme] and Gary Goetzman, he wanted Jonathan to direct it. Jonathan had just finished Married to the Mob, which hadn't been released yet, and he had shot in Miami, and he said to Fred: "Why don't you give it to Din [George Armitage]? Give it to George." And he did, and I loved it. He said "Do you want to write the script and direct it?" I said "Absolutely, let's go." I had worked for Mike Medavoy, who was now head of Orion Pictures, on Vigilante Force, and he said: "Sure, good." Fred, Jonathan, and Gary—who would go on to produce a number of wonderful things for Tom Hanks's company, though this was his first film—were amazingly helpful.

Armitage says the script omitted a key plot point in the novel, that the Hare Krishna killed by Fred was Susie's brother. "It took 10 or 15 pages to explain that relationship, and it bothered me—that kind of serendipity. And we were just sitting there talking: "Why do we need to have that anyways?" It really was just a matter of economy. In early drafts it was in. In the novel it works beautifully, because it's Willeford." At one stage Gene Hackman was going to play Hoke and Fred Ward was to play Junior. Then Hackman dropped out and Alec Baldwin came in to read.

He knocked us out, so I said: "Fred, what do you think?" He said: "He's Junior. I'll be Hoke." And Alec was extraordinary. It rained a lot during the shoot, which would shut us down because you could hear the rain on the roof, it was too loud, so we'd have to wait it out. One day we were sitting around Junior and Susie's house, and Alec gets behind the camera and does about a five-minute impression of Tak Fujimoto. Then he moves over to the electrical department and does spot-on impressions of all of those guys. Everybody was awestruck. He also did an impression of me that was rather insulting, and very funny. What I wanted to do in that was have the audience go on that ride with Junior while he was running around and playing cop, and to really enjoy it—and the audiences I saw it with did—but then slowly I wanted to take it away from them, so that by the end they would feel a little bit guilty about having so much fun earlier on in the picture. However, it kind of backfired—we did a preview in New Jersey, and the audience was horrified when Junior died, they practically rioted when Alec was killed … Alec had a little problem with that—he wanted to be a little broader, I was afraid he was commenting on the character, but I must tell you: he was right. We didn't really agree on set, but then he gave me a call [years later] … and said: "Hey, I'm glad you made me do this and that." I said: "I'm glad you did what you did, too." It was a little broader than I would've asked him to play it, but I really like what he did.

Principal photography began on September 28, 1988, in Miami and lasted nine weeks.

== Reception ==
=== Box office ===
The film's release was delayed to try to take advantage of Baldwin's success in The Hunt for Red October, which had been released two months earlier, but failed to do so, with an opening weekend gross of $3 million from 832 screens to place fourth for the weekend, behind The Hunt for Red October. It went on to gross $9.9 million in the United States and Canada.

=== Critical response ===
On the review aggregator website Rotten Tomatoes, the film holds a rating of 86% based on 28 reviews. The website's critics consensus reads, "Laced with hard-boiled thrills and pitch-black comedy, Miami Blues delivers a disarmingly off-kilter crime caper." On Metacritic, which assigns a weighted average score out of 100 to reviews from mainstream critics, the film received an average score of 72, based on reviews from 27 critics, indicating "generally favorable" reviews. Audiences surveyed by CinemaScore gave the film a grade "C" on a scale of A to F.

Janet Maslin of The New York Times wrote: "Miami Blues is best appreciated for the performances of its stars and for the kinds of funny, scene-stealing peripheral touches that keep it lively even when it's less than fully convincing." Roger Ebert of the Chicago Sun-Times gave the film two out of four stars and wrote: "They're looking for the right tone in Miami Blues, and they don't find it very often, but when they do, you can see what they were looking for."

=== Accolades ===
For her role in Miami Blues and the film Last Exit to Brooklyn, Jennifer Jason Leigh won the award for Best Supporting Actress from both the New York Film Critics Circle and the Boston Society of Film Critics.
