= Robert Corff =

American actor and singer

Robert Corff (born October 31, 1947) is an American actor and singer who played the lead in Gas-s-s-s (1970).

He currently is a voice coach.

== Filmography ==
Year	Title	Role	Notes
1970	Zig Zag	Prisoner	Uncredited
1970	Gas-s-s-s	Coel	
1985	Fright Night	Jonathan	(final film role)
2014	Do I Sound Gay?	Himself	Documentary

== Select theatre credits ==
- Jesus Christ Superstar – New York – 1971
- Mass by Leonard Bernstein – Los Angeles – 1972–73
- South Pacific – Las Vegas – 1973
- Dames at Sea – San Diego – 1974
