= The Ballad of Andy Crocker =

- DVD cover
- Genre: Drama
- Written by: Stuart Margolin
- Directed by: George McCowan
- Starring: Lee Majors; Joey Heatherton; Pat Hingle; Jimmy Dean; Barbara Leigh; Jill Haworth; Marvin Gaye; Agnes Moorehead
- Music by: Billy May
- Country of origin: United States
- Original language: English

Production
- Executive producers: Aaron Spelling; Danny Thomas
- Producer: Aaron Spelling
- Cinematography: Henry Cronjager Jr.
- Editor: Bob Lewis
- Running time: 74 minutes
- Production company: Thomas/Spelling Productions

Original release
- Network: ABC
- Release: November 18, 1969

The Ballad of Andy Crocker is a 1969 American made-for-television film produced by Thomas/Spelling Productions, which was first broadcast by ABC on November 18, 1969, in the anthology series ABC Movie of the Week.

The film tells the story of a young man's struggle to reclaim his life after fighting in the Vietnam War. It tells a surreal, allegorical tale, similarly to The Swimmer starring Burt Lancaster. Written by actor Stuart Margolin, the film is notable as being one of the first films to deal with the subject matter of Vietnam veterans "coming home". It is also noted for its unusual casting, which placed a number of noted musical artists in key acting roles, including Jimmy Dean and Marvin Gaye.

== Plot ==
Andy Crocker is a soldier who is wounded in a firefight in Vietnam and awarded the Purple Heart. After leaving his best friend David, he meets a young hippie girl who invites him to a party. The men at the party do not want him present; Crocker leaves and returns their hospitality by stealing one of their motorcycles that he rides home to Dallas, Texas, where he reunites with his parents. Crocker says that all that kept him going during the trials of Vietnam was his dreams of running a motorcycle racing track and repair shop and marrying his sweetheart, Lisa.

Crocker, however, soon discovers that his friends and loved ones have moved on while he was in Vietnam and away for three years. Lisa has married another man (her "Dear John" letter to Andy apparently never received), and a friend entrusted to take care of the unsuccessful motorcycle track business and repair shop (Mack) has made arrangements to sell it out from under Andy. An attempt at rekindling his relationship with Lisa ends in disaster.

Ultimately, Andy finds himself running afoul of Lisa's family (particularly her rich mother, who offers Andy a loan to help save the racetrack business as long as he leaves town), and the law after he punches Mack for betraying him. Fleeing from the Dallas area, Andy eventually finds himself in San Francisco where he briefly reunites with his old army friend David. Afterwards, realizing he has nowhere else to go, he sits down in front of a U.S. Army Recruiting Office and waits for the doors to open.

== Cast ==
- Lee Majors as Andy Crocker
- Joey Heatherton as Lisa
- Marvin Gaye as David Owens
- Jimmy Dean as Mack
- Bobby Hatfield as Joe Bob
- Agnes Moorehead as Lisa's mother
- Pat Hingle as Earl Crocker
- Jill Haworth as Karen
- Mimi Dillard as Sara
- Barbara Leigh as Mia
- Lee de Broux as Johnson
- Charlie Briggs as Mr. Paisley
- Claudia Bryar as Emily Crocker
- Peter Haskell as Nelson
- Joe Higgins as Mr. Bedecker

== Production ==
Aaron Spelling attempted to buy the film and show it in theatres but ABC refused.

According to Allmovie, the film was intended as a pilot for a potential weekly series ("Corporal Crocker"), but no series eventuated.

== See also ==
- List of films in the public domain in the United States
