= The Student Nurses =

- Theatrical release poster
- Directed by: Stephanie Rothman
- Written by: Don Spencer
- Based on: original story by Stephanie Rothman; Charles S. Swartz
- Produced by: Charles S. Swartz; Stephanie Rothman; Roger Corman (uncredited) associate Paul Rapp
- Starring: Elaine Giftos; Brioni Farrell; Barbara Leigh; Darrell Larson
- Cinematography: Stevan Larner
- Edited by: Stephen Judson
- Music by: Clancy B. Glass III
- Distributed by: New World Pictures
- Release date: December 2, 1970
- Running time: 89 minutes
- Country: United States
- Language: English
- Budget: $120,000 or $140,000
- Box office: over $1 million

The Student Nurses is a 1970 American film directed by Stephanie Rothman. It was the second film from New World Pictures and the first in the popular "nurses" cycle of exploitation movies. It has since become a cult film.

== Plot ==
Four young women share a house as they study to be nurses—Phred falls for a sexy doctor, Jim, despite accidentally sleeping with Jim's roommate. Free-spirited Priscilla, who does not wear a bra, has an affair with a drug-selling biker who gets her pregnant and leaves her, causing her to seek an abortion. Sharon forms a relationship with a terminally ill patient. Lynn sets up a free clinic with a Hispanic revolutionary, Victor Charlie.

The hospital turns down Priscilla's request to have an abortion, so she gets an illegal one from Jim, with the help of Lynn and Sharon, despite Phred's vehement opposition. Sharon's lover/patient dies, and she decides to join the Army Nurse Corps and serve in Vietnam. Victor Charlie is involved in a shootout with the police and goes on the run; Lynn decides to go with him. Phred breaks up with Jim, but Priscilla and she agree to remain friends. The four friends graduate together.

== Cast ==
- Elaine Giftos as Sharon
- Karen Carlson as Phred
- Brioni Farrell as Lynn
- Barbara Leigh as Priscilla
- Reni Santoni as Victor Charlie
- Richard Rust as Les
- Lawrence P. Casey as Jim Caspar
- Darrell Larson as Greg
- Paul Camen as Mark
- Richard Stahl as Dr. Warshaw
- Scottie MacGregor as Miss Boswell
- Pepe Serna as Luis
- John Pearce as Patient
- Mario Aniov as Ralpho
- Ron Gans as Psychiatrist

== Production ==
=== Development ===
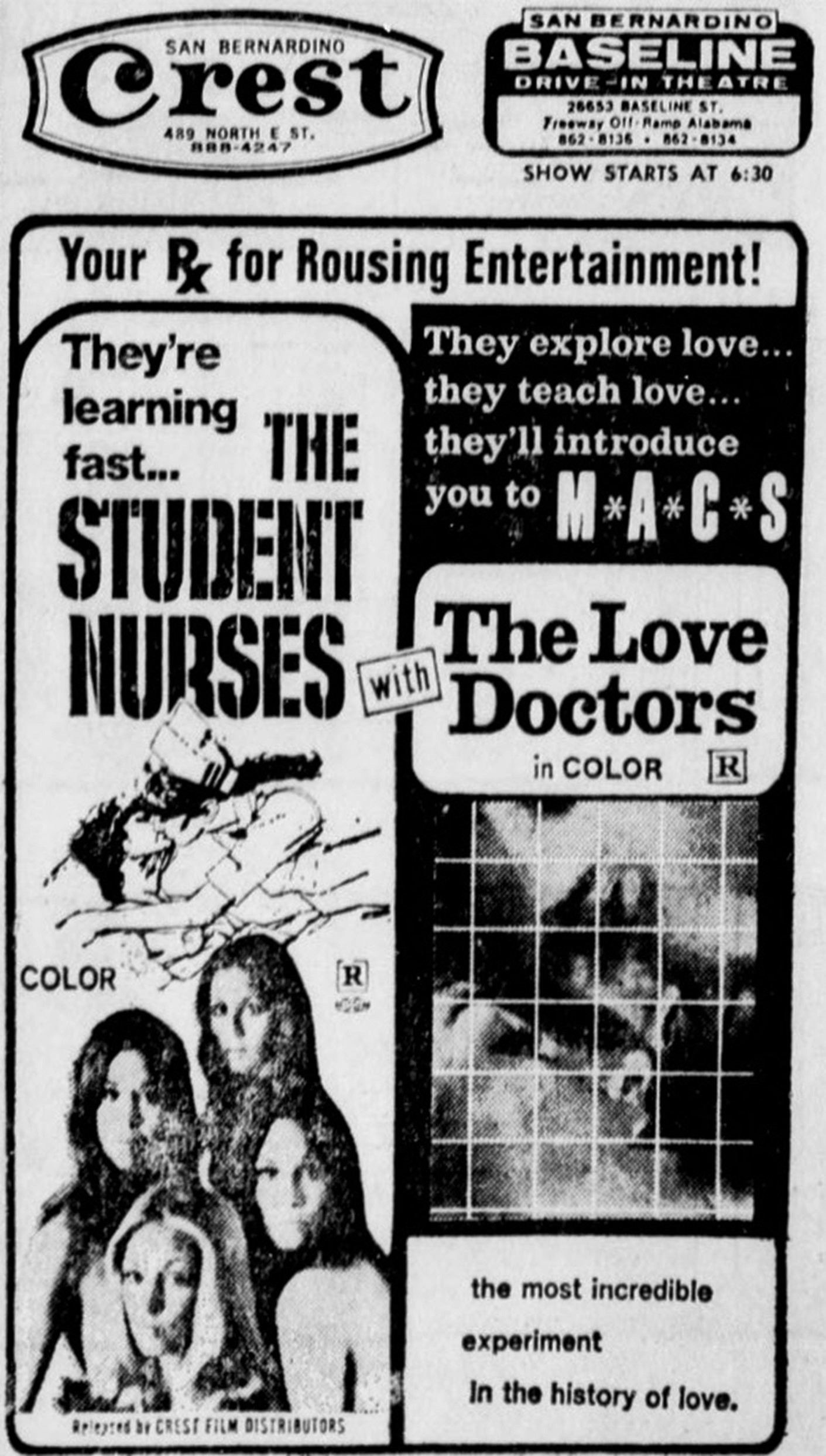
Advertisement from 1970 for The Student Nurses and co-feature, The Love Doctors

The film was the second made for Roger Corman's new production and distribution company, New World Pictures, following Angels Die Hard. The idea for the movie came from distributor Larry Woolner, who was involved in the establishment of New World; he suggested to Corman that he make a film about sexy nurses. Stephanie Rothman, who went on to direct the film, later recalled:

The sub-distributors had recently had success with a R-rated film about a babysitter (The Babysitter), which had more nudity than audiences could see in films made by major studios. At that time, it was believed by the purveyors of male fantasies in films that nurses were a popular male fantasy because they were caring, and they were women who could legitimately touch men all over. [chuckles] So they requested a film be made about very pretty student nurses with as much nudity as an R-rated film could have.

Roger Corman said the film:

Took shape out of a formula I had been working on for some time: contemporary dramas with a liberal to left wing viewpoint and some R-rated sex and humour. But they were not to be comedies. I frankly doubt the left-wing bent, or message, was crucial to the success of the films we would do. But it was important to the filmmakers and me that we have something to say within the films... I insisted each (nurse) had to work out her problems without relying on a boyfriend.

Corman allocated the project to the husband and wife team of Stephanie Rothman and Charles S. Swartz, who had worked on a number of different projects for Corman, including It's a Bikini World and Gas-s-s-s. Rothman would direct, and she and her husband would both produce and provide the original story. Rothman:

We made it while Roger was out of the country, directing... Von Richthofen and Brown (1971), so we were free to develop the story of the nurses as we wished, as long as there was enough nudity and violence distributed throughout it. Please notice, I did not say sex, I said nudity. This freedom, once I paid my debt to the requirements of the genre, allowed me to address what interested me... political and social conflicts and the changes they produce. It allowed me to have a dramatized discussion about issues that were then being ignored in big-budget major studio films: for example, a discussion about the economic problems of poor Mexican immigrants... and their unhappy, restive children; and a discussion about a woman's right to have a safe and legal abortion when, at the time, abortion was still illegal in America. I have always wondered why the major studios were not making films about these topics. What kind of constraints were at work on them? My guess is that it was nothing but the over-privileged lives, limited curiosity and narrow minds of the men, and in those days they were always men, who decided which films would be made.

Rothman says Corman hired them in January 1970. She and her husband sat down with New World's story editor Frances Doel to form a treatment then they hired Don Spencer to write the script. Rothman said Spencer did "very good work. He contributed some excellent dialogue. The attitudes, the approaches, and what happens in the piece were mostly our ideas. The way it was executed, in terms of dialogue and the tone of the dialogue, were largely his."

Rothman says when she started work on the movie she did not consider it an "exploitation film".

I first learned the term when it was used in a review of The Student Nurses. I thought I was making low-budget genre films. But whatever I was making was called, it irritated me that many contemporary films, regardless of their budgets, were dishonest about everything from sexual politics to social conflict. Since I didn't know how long I would be able to work making any kind of film, I decided to say what I wanted while I had the chance, instead of playing it safe... The women in my films are independent in thought and action. I think this stands out because of the limited, usually subordinate roles, that were written for them in that era. It was indeed my intention to change that in my films. I wanted to create – as in the real world I wanted to see – a more equal and just balance of power between the sexes. That is why in some scenes the men are nude as well as the women, which definitely was not the convention then. But I wanted the women's independence to extend far beyond that issue to a life filled with meaning and purpose beyond marriage. Some women lived such lives in the Seventies, but it was a more novel idea in life and films than it is today.

Rothman said Corman did not ask for the more progressive elements of the movie, such as the abortion sequence and depiction of Chicano labor issues. However "we had both known him for a number of years now, and we knew that he was very open-minded about these issues, and so we didn’t expect him to not accept them, and in fact that turned out to be true."

Rothman said there were several reasons the film would focus on four nurses as opposed to one: it would mean there could be several pretty actresses, the responsibility of the lead roles would not fall on one actress, she could explore relationships between woman, and there had been successful films about young doctors a decade earlier.

It has been argued the film was very much part of the three girls movie genre.

=== Casting ===
Most of the cast were unknown, although Elaine Giftos had been in Gas-s-s-s. Barbara Leigh later wrote in her memoirs about her casting that, "Stephanie saw an innocence about me, which she liked. When she interviewed me, she asked me to expose my breasts, so she could see if they were worth photographing.

Rothman said the nudity was required because:

The reason audiences came to see these low-budget films without stars was because they delivered scenes that you could not see in major studio films or more supposedly ambitious independent American films... My struggle was to try to dramatically justify such scenes and to make them transgressive, but not repulsive. I tried to control this through the style in which I shot scenes... Comedy was another method of control I used. I have always enjoyed writing and directing comedy– I was, in fact, more comfortable working in a comic idiom than a dramatic one–and so I also used comedy to modulate a scene's tone."

=== Filming ===
Filming began in April 1970. Barbara Leigh says her most memorable scene was when her character was nude on the beach, taking orange juice laced with acid from her lover (Richard Rust). When the scene was shot, Rust gave her orange juice laced with real acid. "I was very stoned on camera", she wrote.

Rothman said in 1977 that "The only thing I consider dated about the abortion sequence is the fact that the law has changed. Priscilla’s attitude would be no different if I made the film today.”

Rothman added "we tried to get the music to reflect the nature of the scene. We wanted it to be in the most popular style of the time, because we thought this would make it a more timely picture, and we wanted to be dramatically appropriate."

== Reception ==
=== Box office ===
The film was an enormous box office success, which Rothman admits took her by surprise, especially when men came to see it "in droves. It was a mystery to me. Only later did I discover that the nurse is a very erotic figure in most male fantasies. There was a wide market out there for films about women and a very responsive audience, not just men. Student Nurses was not a film designed exclusively for men. Many women came to see it."

The movie helped establish New World Pictures as a production company and kicked off a cycle of similar films about young women having adventures while doing a familiar job:

- nurses – Private Duty Nurses (1971), Night Call Nurses (1972), The Young Nurses (1973), Candy Stripe Nurses (1974);
- teachers – The Student Teachers (1973), Summer School Teachers (1974);
- stewardesses – Fly Me (1973);
- models – Cover Girl Models (1975);
- actresses – Hollywood Boulevard (1976).

Rothman says Corman wanted to make a sequel but she was not interested:

I had said all I wanted to about student nurses, and so he hired a series of male directors to make the sequels. I never watched them, so I cannot say if they contained any feminist ideas. But the lesson Roger derived from my film's success was that you could make exploitation films whose narratives included contentious social issues, including feminism, and he consequently encouraged his directors to do it.

=== Critical response ===
The Los Angeles Times said the film "seems little more than a belated pilot film for The Interns with overheated loins and under-thunk narrative" but which is "never quite as bad as it threatens to be. A taste prevails, holds it in check and manages to make individual characters and relationships intermittently believable."

Daily Variety wrote that the movie "is a good contemporary dual-bill item about the varying romantic experiences of four novice nurses. The acting level is fair at best, which drags down what otherwise is a well-crafted film... Stephanie Rothman's physical direction is excellent... an exploitation item to be sure, but beyond those angles, general audiences will find a surprising depth."

In later years, Pam Cook wrote that "viewed today, Student Nurses is a remarkable achievement. It is striking not only for its high production values, but also for its sophisticated discourse on 1970s politics – neither of which would necessarily be expected from an exploitation film. Also unexpected are the drug-induced fantasy sequences, which are more in line with the European art cinema than the rough and ready codes of exploitation. Rothman's inclusion of a relatively graphic abortion sequence, cut against scenes of one of the nurses having casual sex, still has a powerful impact."

Filmink called it "an absolutely terrific piece of feminist exploitation" with "everything Corman requested and more: nudity, character conflict, attractive performers, socially progressive attitudes, left-wing viewpoint, a bit of action and lots of sex. The four leads are all different character types, but all are in charge of their own destinies and support each other; they know the importance of friendship, a good root [sex] and a job with a career, make their own decisions, fight their own battles, and argue their own positions." The magazine added the abortion plot was "an outstanding sequence that still hasn’t received its due critically."

== See also ==
- List of American films of 1970

== Sources ==
- Peary, Dannis (1977). "Stephanie Rothman R-rated Feminist". In Kay, Karyn; Peary, Gerald (eds.). Women and the cinema : a critical anthology. Dutton. pp. 179–192. ISBN 978-0-525-47459-3.
