= The Working Girls =

1974 film by Stephanie Rothman

- Directed by: Stephanie Rothman
- Written by: Stephanie Rothman
- Produced by: Charles S. Swartz; Executive; Lawrence Woolner
- Starring: Sarah Kennedy; Laurie Rose; Cassandra Peterson
- Cinematography: Daniel Lacambre
- Edited by: John A. O'Connor
- Music by: Michael Andres
- Distributed by: Dimension Pictures
- Release date: 1974
- Running time: 80 minutes
- Country: USA
- Language: English
- Budget: $103,000

The Working Girls is a 1974 sexploitation film written and directed by Stephanie Rothman and starring Sarah Kennedy, Laurie Rose and Cassandra Peterson.

It is about three women sharing an apartment in Los Angeles - Honey, Jill and Denise - who are all endangered by the men in their lives.

The film was Rothman's last as a director. She and her husband, Charles Swartz, left Dimension Pictures after making it and she was unable to find other directing work.

The film has attracted academic interest because of its feminist themes. Rothman said "I think it’s my most mature work. It was my last and I think it’s my most mature."

== Plot ==
A blonde, Honey, has a degree in math. She arrives in Los Angeles, determined to find a job and is thrown out of a diner after offering the owner to pay with sex. She comes across a "room vacant" sign near an apartment rented by sign painter Denise, who offers to put up Honey until she can pay rent. Denise introduces Honey to Roger, who does nude modelling for Denise. Denise has another roommate, Jill, who works as a cocktail waitress in a strip club while she studies to be a lawyer.

Honey runs into a man in a park, Mike, and takes him home to sleep with him. Denise admires Mike's body and wants to paint him. She and Mike fall for each other instantly which upsets Honey who leaves the apartment. They track her down to the beach and bring her home.

The strip club where Jill works is owned by Sidney. One of the dancers, Katya, advises Jill to become a dancer. After an awkward start she does well, but then Sidney offers her more money to run the club, and Jill agrees. A gangster, Nicholas, meets Jill demanding protection money off Sidney. She and Nicholas start a relationship.

Honey has put an ad in the newspaper seeking any sort of work. She is hired by Mrs. Borden to kill the latter's husband; Honey arranges for the lady to be arrested. This escapade attracts the attention of eccentric businessman, Vernon, who hires Honey to work for him.

Nicholas warns Jill that Mike is a fence, and is upsetting some other gangsters. Jill arrives to find gangsters beating up Mike. She tries to stop them, they attack her and Nicholas pulls her away. Denise tells the girls they are being kicked out by their landlord.

Vernon gives Honey some money as thanks for some business advice she gave him. Honey passes on the money to Denise, Mike and Jill, then leaves, seeking more adventures.

== Cast ==
- Sarah Kennedy - Honey
- Laurie Rose - Denise
- Mark Thomas - Nick
- Lynne Guthrie - Jill
- Ken Del Conte - Mike
- Solomon Sturges - Vernon
- Gene Elman - Sidney
- Mary Beth Hughes - Mrs. Borden
- Lou Tiano - Lou
- Cassandra Peterson - Katya
- Bob Schott - Roger

== Production ==
The finance came from a motion picture distributor in Canada who wanted a film along the lines of The Student Nurses, an earlier film from writer-director Stephanie Rothman. "He wanted me to make another film about a group of attractive young women who lived together and about their adventures," said Rothman. "I thought it would be interesting to have a group of young women live together this time, who did not do the same job, they did different jobs."

The $103,000 budget was the smallest she had to work with as a director. Rothman said "I was hired to do as a pretty, sexy, graphically strong (I hope), comic film.

Rothamn said the title was ironic in that the leads all "had higher aspirations than they were at the current time able to achieve". She felt the title "would probably be a commercial asset, you know, in the advertising campaign but I was not personally interested in implying that these people were, in any sense, prostitutes."

Rothman said the film was "about the quest for identity that we are all on when we are young. It is a serious film about three underemployed young women who no one takes seriously enough. By the film’s end, they have learned such life lessons as an open heart can lead to the warmth of friendship, the impermanence of love and the pain of loss; desire for the wrong man is not good for one’s ethics or ambitions; and most surprising of all, learning how to be a capitalist can lead to becoming a utopian socialist."

She elaborated: "I tried to make it as comedic and as energetic and provocative as I could, and to throw in as many ideas as I could, about what it meant to be young and female and ambitious in a world that did not particularly approve of ambition in young women."

The film was one of Rothman's most personal works. She said "I am particularly drawn to the problem that the three main characters face, a problem shared by most young people: how to find work that will support them and provide satisfaction at the same time.”

The movie features the first screen acting appearance by Cassandra Peterson who later became famous as a late night movie host, Elvira. Peterson had been a dancer in Las Vegas, though not a stripper. Rothman says she and Peterson went to watch strippers in clubs and "we discussed what would be the appropriate moves that would not be too ugly, very frankly, because a lot of the moves strippers do, if you saw them on film you’d find them quite ugly. I wanted her to do— and she wanted to do—something graceful and sexy." She says they choreographed the number together.

Rothman felt the ending of the film was hopeful although "there is no more employment possibility for these people at the end than there was at the beginning. But they have developed certain strengths. They have developed a certain strength of character. They have gone through adversity and they have prevailed and they’ve survived the adversity, older and wiser but not deterred from their ambitions. They will carry on. They will go on."

== Critical reception ==
Film Fanatic said "While its weak ensemble storyline ultimately makes this one of Rothman’s lesser efforts, it’s certainly worth a look by followers of slyly subversive feminist cinema." Screen Slate said Rotham "crafted an apparently playful but deeply personal statement about the importance of autonomy in both the bedroom and the workplace."

The Chicago Reader felt the film "finds Rothman plainly fed up with the limitations of the exploitation genre, and the wit, stylistic assurance, and feminist subtexts she was able to insert in her earlier work in the field... are largely lacking here."

Mondo Digital called the film "a surprisingly benign and sunny film... While it doesn't have quite the same satirical snap as her [Rothman's] finest work, there's plenty to enjoy here as the plot careens from one absurd situation to another, and even better, it provides a great snapshot of '70s SoCal... Rothman's gift for swerving dialogue in unpredictable directions is still present here in abundance as even the most disreputable characters display a verbal flair and generous disposition."

A retrospective of Rothman's work said the film "may just be her masterpiece... the political subtext that had colored her earlier works had become the outright text, with sex work, equity in the workplace, and abuse becoming the focal points to each of her characters’ conflicts. What the film may lack in production values compared to her New World productions, it more than makes up for in the sophistication of Rothman’s compositions."

== See also ==
- List of American films of 1974

== Sources ==
- Peary, Dannis (1977). "Stephanie Rothman R-rated Feminist". In Kay, Karyn; Peary, Gerald (eds.). Women and the cinema : a critical anthology. Dutton. pp. 179–192. ISBN 978-0-525-47459-3.
