= George Armitage =

American film director (1942–2025)

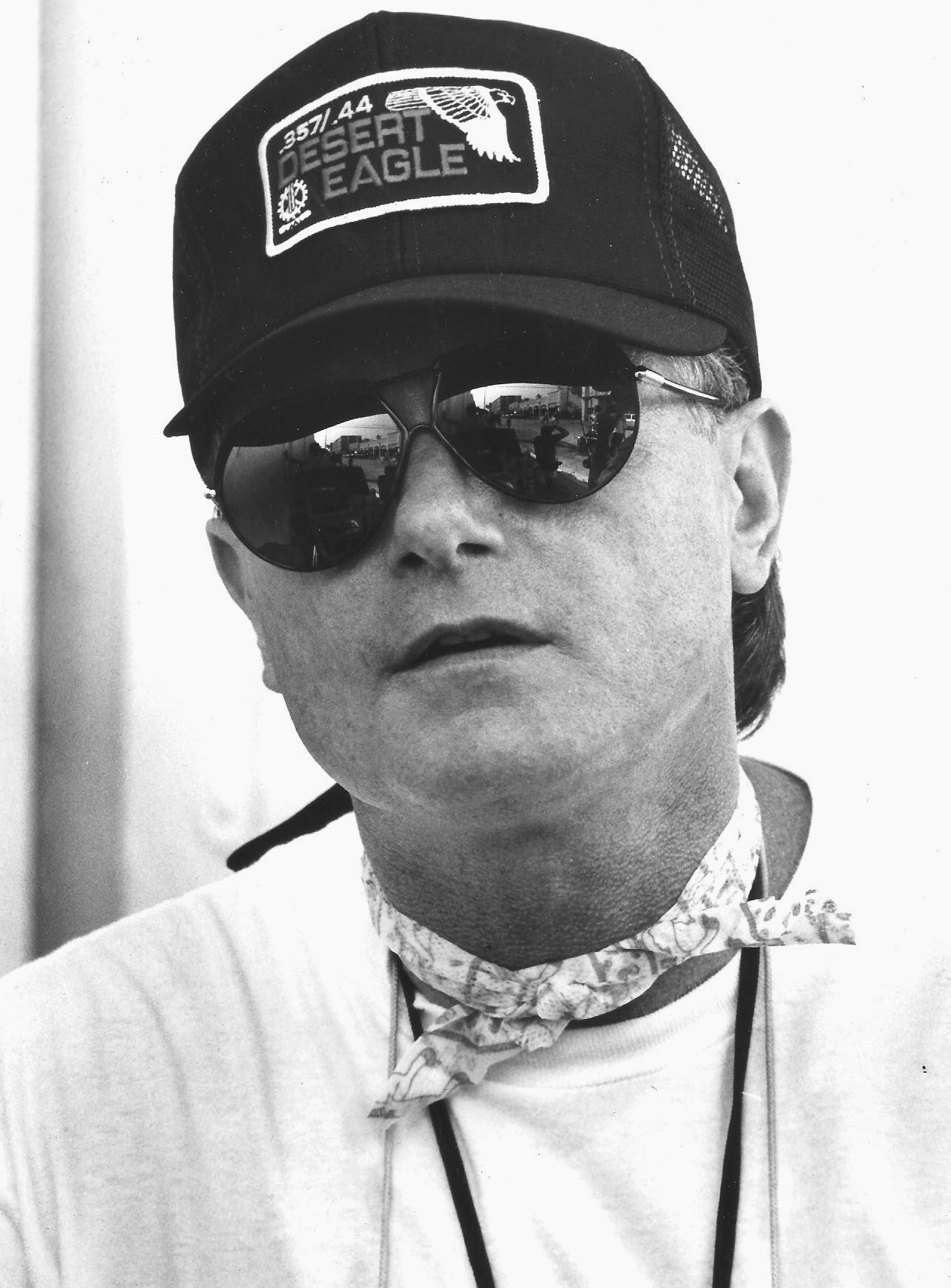
- Armitage in 1988
- Born: December 13, 1942; Hartford, Connecticut, U.S.
- Died: February 15, 2025 (aged 82); Los Angeles, California, U.S.
- Occupation: Filmmaker
- Spouse: Sharon (m. 1962)
- Children: 1

George Brendan Armitage (December 13, 1942 – February 15, 2025) was an American filmmaker and writer best known for directing the films Miami Blues (1990) and Grosse Pointe Blank (1997), as well as for frequent collaborations with Roger Corman.

== Early life ==
George Brendan Armitage was born in Hartford, Connecticut, on December 13, 1942. He had an older brother. His mother was a writer who wanted to get into movies, so they moved to Beverly Hills when he was 13, in 1956. He later said of this, "What a culture shock. I'm still reeling. In Connecticut there wasn't a hot rod in sight. Out here it was people racing up and down the street, building their own cars—it was teenage paradise, the kids were running everything." He attended UCLA, where he majored in economics and political science. While waiting for his real estate license to come through, he entered the film industry in 1965 via the mail room at 20th Century Fox.

== Career ==
In 1966, Armitage became an associate producer on Peyton Place which he said was "primarily to deal with the young kids on the show, to help them loop their lines". Armitage recalls his period at Fox as an "incredible experience... I went from producer to producer all over the lot pitching ideas, I created series, I wrote a couple of things for television and, about that time, started writing screenplays". He recalled, "The counterculture movement had begun, and the people running Fox, especially in the television division, were these 30-ish hipsters, kind of jazz guys. Suddenly I was a person, being 20 or 21, who could explain to them what was going on, and I became very valuable on the lot." He worked as associate producer on Judd for the Defense and created a TV series and tried to co-produce a TV movie but neither went beyond script stage.

Armitage met brothers Roger and Gene Corman at Fox while they were making The St Valentine's Day Massacre. He recalled, "The commissary was a place called the Gold Room where the producers would go. They were all sort of mothballed, but they still had energy enough to snob the television people, who were making High Noon, Lost in Space, Batman. The movie producers would sit on the other side of the room from the TV people. This left the TV people with nobody else to snob, so they would snob Roger Corman... and that really pissed me off, because I was a fan of his. So I began to visit him on the set and the whole thing, and told him about the conflict that was going on, and he got a kick out of that." Armitage left Fox in 1967 to focus on movies. He wrote a script called Carrot Butts about animated cartoon characters coming to life. This was sent to the Cormans, who liked it but could not get financing. Roger suggested a film in which "everybody over 30 died", prompting Armitage to write Gas-s-s-s, impressing Corman enough to allow Armitage to write and direct Private Duty Nurses. Corman also optioned an Armitage script called Coming Together.

In 1972, Armitage wrote and directed Hit Man, which was acclaimed in John Cribbs' Obscure Genius series. In 1975, he was quoted in an article as saying, "I try to follow the Hollywood sports to see who's winning. It doesn't seem the best system to make films that are both interesting and commercial, but it's the only one that works, at least for me. I think there must be other ways but I can't think of them. It's all new to me, even after ten years. I would like to see more courage and imagination, of course. That's something to look for." In 1976, he directed Vigilante Force. It was not a large success and Armitage's career then became bogged down in "development hell" apart from the movie Hot Rod.

Armitage spent the 1980s largely writing screenplays which were never made. In 1990, he wrote and directed the film Miami Blues. In 1997, he directed the film Grosse Pointe Blank, on which his son worked as an associate producer. In 2001, he launched script development consultancy StudioNotes with his son. His final film was the 2004 remake of The Big Bounce, which Armitage felt had become greatly diminished by the decision to re-edit and seek a PG-Rating instead of an R rating, after the original cut was rated NC-17.

== Personal life ==
Armitage and his wife, Sharon, were married for 63 years from 1962 until his death in 2025. They had a son named Brent, who also became a screenwriter and producer, and two grandchildren.

== Death ==
Armitage died in the Playa del Rey neighborhood of Los Angeles on February 15, 2025, at the age of 82.

== Filmography ==
=== Film ===
Year	Title	Director	Writer	Producer
1971	Gas-s-s-s	No	Yes	Associate
1971	Private Duty Nurses	Yes	Yes	Yes
1972	Night Call Nurses	No	Yes	No
1972	Hit Man	Yes	Yes	No
1975	Darktown Strutters	No	Yes	No
1976	Vigilante Force	Yes	Yes	No
1990	The Last of the Finest	No	Yes	No
1990	Miami Blues	Yes	Yes	No
1997	Grosse Pointe Blank	Yes	No	No
2004	The Big Bounce	Yes	No	Yes

Unmade screenplays

Year	Title	Description	Ref.
1960s	Carrott Butts	Pitched to Roger Corman	
1970	Coming Together	Pitched to Roger Corman	
1970s	Trophy	Story of two police departments who end up in a shooting war	
1975	Pochantonas Revenge	About a miracle staged by a stunt man and special effects person to raise a small town's spirit	
1975	Tantruma	For producer Paul Lazarus about a man looking for a woman from his past	

Acting roles

Year	Title	Role
1970	Gas-s-s-s	Billy The Kid
1971	Von Richthofen and Brown	Wolff
1974	Caged Heat	Driver

=== Television ===
Year	Title	Director	Writer	Notes
1971	Monty Nash	No	Yes	Episode "Brother Zachary"
1979	Hot Rod	Yes	Yes	TV movie
1996	The Late Shift	No	Yes	TV movie
