= Charles S. Swartz =

American film producer

Charles Samuel Swartz (April 22, 1939 – February 10, 2007) was an American filmmaker, researcher, and academic. He was raised in Dallas, earned a degree from Yale University and did graduate work at the University of Southern California. At USC he met and married another film student, Stephanie Rothman. He and Rothman worked together on a number of films for Roger Corman and were involved in the establishment of Dimension Pictures.

Swartz later became an important figure in the development of digital cinema, writing the textbook Understanding Digital Cinema: A Professional Handbook (2004) and working at the research centre of the University of Southern California Entertainment Technology Centre from 2003–2007. He died of pneumonia following a battle with brain cancer.

== Filmography ==
- It's a Bikini World (1967) – producer, co-writer
- Gas-s-s-s (1970) – production assistant
- The Student Nurses (1970) – producer, writer
- The Velvet Vampire (1971) – producer, writer
- Group Marriage (1973) – producer
- The Working Girls (1974) – producer

== Bibliography ==
- Charles S. Swartz (editor), Understanding digital cinema. A professional handbook, Elseiver / Focal Press, Burlington, Oxford, 2005, xvi + 327 p. ISBN 0-240-80617-4
