= The Velvet Vampire =

1971 film by Stephanie Rothman

- Theatrical release poster
- Directed by: Stephanie Rothman
- Written by: Stephanie Rothman; Charles S. Swartz; Maurice Jules
- Produced by: Charles S. Swartz
- Starring: Celeste Yarnall; Michael Blodgett; Sherry Miles; Gene Shane; Jerry Daniels; Sandy Ward; Paul Prokop
- Cinematography: Daniel Lacambre
- Edited by: Stephen Judson; Barry Simon
- Music by: Clancy B Glass III; Roger Dollarhide
- Distributed by: New World Pictures
- Release date: June 16, 1971
- Running time: 80 minutes
- Country: United States
- Language: English
- Budget: $165,000

The Velvet Vampire, also known as Cemetery Girls, is a 1971 American vampire film directed by Stephanie Rothman. It stars Celeste Yarnall, Michael Blodgett, Sherry Miles, Gene Shane, Jerry Daniels, Sandy Ward, and Paul Prokop. It has been cited as a cult film.

== Plot ==
Lee and his wife Susan accept an invitation from a mysterious woman, Diane, to visit her secluded desert estate. Unaware that Diane is a vampire, tensions arise as the couple realize that they are both Diane's objects of seduction.

== Cast ==
- Celeste Yarnall as Diane LeFanu
- Michael Blodgett as Lee Ritter
- Sherry Miles as Susan Ritter
- Gene Shane as Carl Stoker
- Jerry Daniels as Juan
- Sandy Ward as Amos
- Paul Prokop as Cliff
- Chris Woodley as Cliff's Girl
- Robert Tessier as The Biker
- Johnny Shines as The Bluesman

== Production ==
The film was Stephanie Rothman's follow-up to her 1970 hit The Student Nurses. She and her husband Charles Swartz had written a script, The Student Teachers, but producer Larry Woolner wanted to make a vampire film after the success of Daughters of Darkness (1970). Rothman and Swartz came up with a present-day vampire story originally entitled Through the Looking Glass.

Rothman says she and her husband wrote the treatment then the script was written by Yale Udoff [also known as Maurice Jules] and rewritten by them. "He did a good job on the script," said Rothman. "I don’t want to detract from his work. It was mostly his work, but we did do a final polish of it ourselves."

Rothman wanted to make the vampire female and have a woman as the protagonist rather than the victim. "I always thought a vampire was a very erotic figure, and I wanted to make a highly erotic vampire who was very appealing and very seductive, and was a modern woman."

The character name "Diane Le Fanu" was a reference to author Sheridan Le Fanu, writer of Carmilla. The art gallery where Lee and Susan first meet Diane is called "The Stoker" after its owner, the character Carl Stoker, an evident reference to Bram Stoker, the author of Dracula.

The script was written over three months. Rothman added comedic elements to make it different from similar material. Rothman later said "I wanted to make a vampire film that dealt explicitly with the sexuality implicit in the vampire legend" adding it "was obviously intended to be a funny film.”

Blues artist Johnny Shines appeared in the film and performed his self-penned song "Evil-Hearted Woman."

The film was shot in February 1971. Yarnall, who had just given birth, remembers "everyone was very accommodating, just a joy to work with. Stephanie...was wonderful, open. It was my first experience having a female director and it was remarkable especially concerning the sexual scenes. Stephanie was very sensitive. She closed the set during the more explicit shots, and there was often just Michael and I and the cameraman."

Rothman recalled "it was a very difficult film to make...it was very hard to shoot in the desert. We were all brushing against spiny Joshua trees and cacti.... Then the weather was so changeable: one moment it was bright and sunny, and the next we were in the middle of a sandstorm."

She also said Sherryl Miles "was very unpleasant on the set—to everybody. She was very young, and I think she was very insecure, and so she took it out on everyone around her."

=== Additional scene ===
Rothman says the film was previewed and received a "polarized audience reaction which made Roger Corman nervous." He insisted Rothman shoot an additional scene of a mechanic being killed by a pitchfork as it was "more exciting and dynamic.... After he saw it with an audience, I don’t think he had much faith in the film."

== Release ==
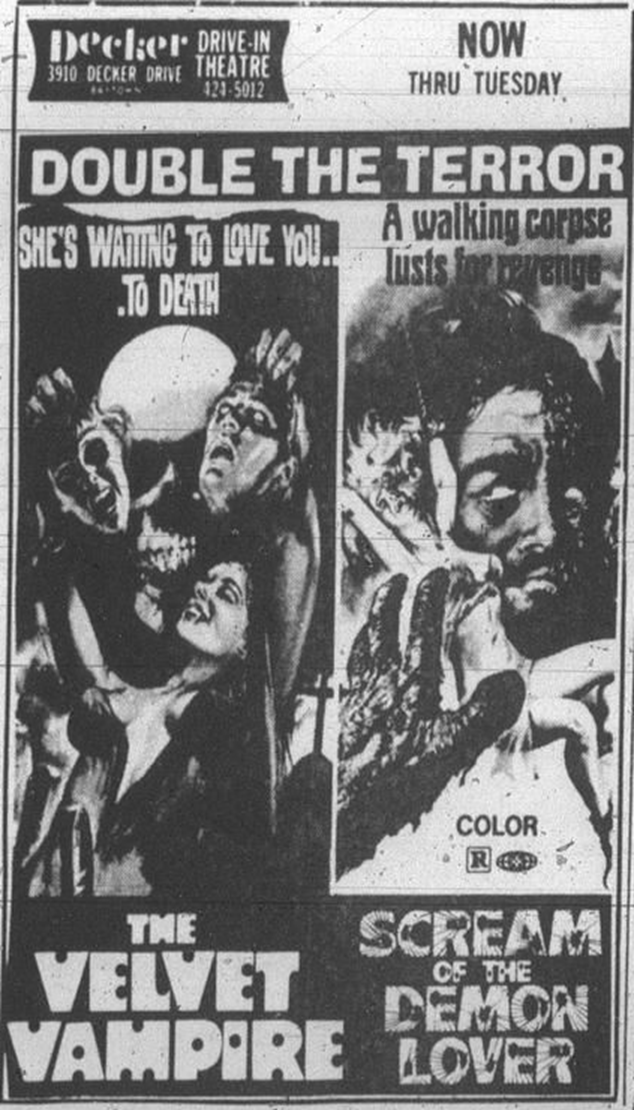
Advertisement from 1971 for The Velvet Vampire and co-feature, Scream of the Demon Lover

Roger Corman later claimed he was disappointed with the final product and released it on a double bill with an Italian horror film, Scream of the Demon Lover.

It has become a cult film.

=== Box office ===
Stephanie Rothman admitted the film's commercial reception was disappointing. She thought the problem may have been the movie:

Fell between two stools. It's not a traditional horror film nor a hard-core exploitation movie. In some places it was booked into art theatres. In others it had one-week saturation release in drive-ins and hard-top theaters. There was no consistent distribution pattern for it because people responded differently to it and I think that may be part of the problem. Also it was an independent producer. There were a lot of other competing vampire movies at the time with star names.... But the film has not been forgotten. It keeps popping up at festivals and retrospectives, even though it did not draw attention to itself at the box office.

The poor response to the film contributed to Rothman and Swartz leaving Roger Corman for Dimension Pictures.

=== Critical ===
The Los Angeles Times wrote "Miss Rothman is at her best in love scenes ...handled with rare sensual beauty and taste. Unfortunately there's little else to be said for The Velvet Vampire."

Variety said the film was "very well produced by Charles S. Swartz, film was poorly directed by Stephanie Rothman, one of the few active femme directors. Pair’s script...is a stew of shock and sex values. The acting is unintentionally ludicrous at times, simply inferior at others. The New World Pictures release will need a hard sell for fast sexploitation duals, where b.o. outlook is bleak."

== See also ==
- List of American films of 1971

== Sources ==
- Peary, Dannis (1977). "Stephanie Rothman R-rated Feminist". In Kay, Karyn; Peary, Gerald (eds.). Women and the cinema : a critical anthology. Dutton. pp. 179–192. ISBN 978-0-525-47459-3.
