= Vigilante Force =

1976 film by George Armitage

- Film poster
- Directed by: George Armitage
- Written by: George Armitage
- Produced by: Gene Corman
- Starring: Kris Kristofferson; Jan-Michael Vincent; Victoria Principal; Bernadette Peters
- Cinematography: William Cronjager
- Edited by: Morton Tubor
- Music by: Gerald Fried
- Production company: Gene Corman Productions
- Distributed by: United Artists
- Release date: August 29, 1976 (US)
- Running time: 89 minutes
- Language: English

Vigilante Force is a 1976 American action film directed by George Armitage and starring Kris Kristofferson and Jan-Michael Vincent. The plot concerns a Vietnam War veteran and his buddies, who are hired by his brother and others in a small California town for protection from rowdy oil-field workers.

== Tagline ==
- They called it God's country ... until all hell broke loose.
- They hired themselves a hero ... and bought themselves a world of trouble.

== Plot ==
When a small California town is overrun with unruly and rowdy behavior from oil-field workers, Ben Arnold (Jan-Michael Vincent), one of the locals, and the brother of Aaron (Kris Kristofferson), a Vietnam War veteran, is hired to assist the police in restoring the peace. Aaron hires mercenaries trained in combat to help. After controlling the oil field workers, the veterans take over the town for their own not-always-legal purposes. Confrontation between the town police and locals and the mercenaries ends in violence.

== Cast ==
- Kris Kristofferson as Aaron Arnold
- Jan-Michael Vincent as Ben Arnold
- Victoria Principal as Linda Christopher
- Bernadette Peters as Dee "Little Dee"
- Brad Dexter as Mayor Bradford
- Judson Pratt as Harry Lee
- David Doyle as Homer Arno
- Antony Carbone as Freddie Howe
- Andrew Stevens as Paul Sinton
- Shelly Novack as D.O. Viner

== Production ==
The film was directed by George Armitage, who says producer Gene Corman came to him with just the title.

Armitage credits the quality of the stunts to Buddy Joe Hooker, stuntman.

That was a 30-day film, but it would be 60 days today because of the stunts and the pyrotechnics. We had Roger George, who was quite a well-known special effects man. It went really well, though we had one little mishap that wasn't really our fault—in the final shootout we blew up a blue van that was parked over an oil pipeline, so after the initial explosion the oil pipeline caught fire.

Armitage says Jan Michael Vincent's character Ben Arnold was named after Benedict Arnold, Kris Kristofferson's character Aaron was named after Aaron Burr and Judson Prett's Harry Lee was Lighthorse Harry Lee:

The entire movie is full of these very slightly coded reference to the Revolutionary War ... [although] What I was really doing there was Vietnam. What would it be like if people took over your town, as we had been doing to the hamlets of Vietnam? What if we brought Vietnam back to America, what would that be like? That's kind of what we were going after, but since the Bicentennial year was coming on and bringing a lot of revisionist history with it, I thought I'd include a little Revolutionary War in the recipe. I've always tried to include something subversive, not hidden from anyone, just for my own interests.

The production designer was Jack Fisk. "We had absolutely no money, no budget, but Jack did extraordinary things—and Sissy Spacek was our assistant art director on that," said Armitage. Armitage says that once Kris Kristofferson agreed to do the film "everybody else followed. Bernadette [Peters] wanted to work with him, Victoria [Principal], and Jan-Michael came over ... It was a good shoot, but it was rough. It was 30 days, it was 108 degrees in the Simi Valley, so a lot of it was tough to do. But we worked through it, finished on time and under budget."

== Reception ==
The Timeout review noted that the film was an "awkward combination of cheapo war and cowboy comics ...", but that "Kristofferson ... shuffles through quite convincingly ..." and "... Bernadette Peters plays an ill-treated, down-at-heel, after-hours singer with real style."

According to Contemporary North American Film Directors, the plot was a not-too-subtle satire on the American way. The studio disliked the film and it was a commercial failure.

On Rotten Tomatoes the film has a score of 14% based on 7 reviews. The websites Letterboxd and The Grindhouse Database list this movie as belonging to the vetsploitation subgenre.
