= Gas-s-s-s =

1970 film by Roger Corman

- Theatrical release poster
- Directed by: Roger Corman
- Written by: George Armitage
- Produced by: Roger Corman
- Starring: Robert Corff; Elaine Giftos; Bud Cort
- Cinematography: Ron Dexter
- Edited by: George Van Noy
- Music by: Country Joe & the Fish
- Production company: San Jacinto Productions
- Distributed by: American International Pictures
- Release date: September 1970
- Running time: 79 minutes
- Country: United States
- Language: English
- Budget: $300,000

Gas-s-s-s (on-screen title: Gas! -Or- It Became Necessary to Destroy the World in Order to Save It.) is a 1970 American post-apocalyptic black comedy film directed by Roger Corman, written by George Armitage, and produced and released by American International Pictures. The plot follows survivors of an accidental military gas leak involving an experimental agent that kills everyone on Earth over the age of 25 (a cartoon title sequence shows a John Wayne-esque Army General announcing — and denouncing — the "accident"; the story picks up as the last of the victims are dying with social commentary on Medicare and Medicaid). The subtitle alludes to the 1968 quote "it became necessary to destroy the town to save it" attributed to a U.S. Army officer after the Battle of Bến Tre in Vietnam.

Robert Corff and Elaine Giftos star, with Ben Vereen, Cindy Williams, Bud Cort, and Talia Shire (credited as "Tally Coppola") in early roles. Country Joe McDonald, who provides the music, makes an appearance as a spokesman for "AM Radio".

It was Corman's final film for AIP as director, after a long association (although he would subsequently produce a few more films for the studio). He was unhappy as AIP made several cuts without his approval, including the removal of the final shot in which God comments on the action — a shot Corman regarded as one of the greatest he had made in his life. The movie has been called one of Corman's most personal works.

== Plot ==
In Dallas, at Southern Methodist University, news comes in about a gas which has escaped from a military facility. It starts killing everyone over 25.

Hippie Coel meets and falls in love with Cilla. They discover a Gestapo-like police force will be running Dallas and flee into the country. Their car is stolen by some cowboys. Coel and Cilla then meet music fan Marissa, her boyfriend Carlos, a man called Hooper and his girlfriend Coralee. Marissa leaves Carlos, who finds a new girlfriend.

The group meet Edgar Allan Poe, who throughout the film drives around on a motorbike with Lenore on the back and a raven on his shoulder, commenting on the action like a Greek chorus.

The group then have an encounter with some golf-playing bikers, after which they attend a dance and concert where AM Radio is performing and passing on messages from God. Coel sleeps with a woman called Zoe, but Cilla is not jealous.

Coel, Cilla and their friends arrive at a peaceful commune at a pueblo where it seems mankind can start fresh. Then, a football team attacks them. Eventually, God intervenes. Coel and Cilla are reunited with all their friends and there is a big party where everyone gets along.

== Cast ==
- Robert Corff as Coel
- Elaine Giftos as Cilla
- Bud Cort as Hooper
- Talia Shire as Coralee
- Ben Vereen as Carlos
- Cindy Williams as Marissa
- Alex Wilson as Jason
- George Armitage as Billy the Kid
- Country Joe McDonald as AM Radio
- Pat Patterson as Demeter
- Gary Caplan as Raincoat Harry

== Production ==
=== Development ===
George Armitage had met Corman at 20th Century Fox when the latter was making The St Valentine's Day Massacre. Armitage later recalled he wrote a script — "it was called either Carrot Butts or A Christmas Carrot — which had animated cartoon characters, Bugs Bunny and so on, coming to life. It was about the studio systems and all this stuff." Armitage's agent gave the script to Gene [Corman, Roger's brother], who passed it on to Roger, "and he loved it, so they submitted it to UA (United Artists) where they had a deal — Mike Medavoy was just taking over there and he was younger than I was. From there, Roger said: 'Well, that didn't work, why don't we try something else?' Usually he has a title or something and he'll say: 'Go ahead, write something, just keep the title'."

Gas-s-s-s was an idea of Corman's, about a world where everybody over 30 had died. Corman later said "my first thought was to do a science fiction film with allegorical overtones." Armitage remembers the concept just being "a sentence, and that's what we went with... He let you make it your own, and I did."

Corman said that although "there was some good work in" Armitage's first draft, "the points I was trying to make in the script either did not come through or came through too obviously different parts, and it became less science fiction and more and more a direct liberal left-wing statement picture. I didn't want to be quite that obvious about what I was doing. So I then decided to switch to a comedy, thinking back to Bucket of Blood and Little Shop of Horrors."

United Artists had financed the writing of the script, but Corman says the studio felt the movie was too risky to finance, as they believed it needed a budget of $2 million. Corman bought the script back off United Artists and decided to finance himself, with a budget of around $300,000.

=== Shooting ===
Corman says filming commenced using a draft that was rewritten constantly throughout the shoot. "Winter was coming and I wanted to do the film", said Corman. "I was going to be shooting in New Mexico. I actually shot in December and to wait one more month would have put me in January and I could not have made the film. To wait till next summer would have dated the material I was dealing with, so I wanted to bring the film out early."

Armitage recalls, "We went back in '69 to shoot in New Mexico and Texas. I was the associate producer as well, and we were writing it as we went — which is something that Roger liked to do.

"It was a very inexpensive film", said Corman. "It was shot with a skeleton crew, with a cast of almost entirely amateur actors. Only the leads were professionals."

Stephanie Rothman had been Corman's assistant in the mid-60s but taken a sabbatical from the industry after making her directorial debut with It's a Bikini World. She went back to work with Corman on Gas-s-s-s as a production manager along with her husband Charles Swartz. "I had a wonderful time working on that film," she later recalled. "I loved it, I really did." She adds the film "was constantly being re-written as we were shooting."

The film features a tribute to Edgar Allan Poe, an author who provided the stories for several Corman films in the early 1960s. Corman says, "It was actually a second thought when we put Poe in it. We just started putting things in. In the original concept, he wasn't in it. And we just decided to put him in on a motorcycle — it seemed appropriate."

"There was some sense of disorganization and experimentation as we went along", says Corman. He claims the film showed:

That I was beginning to get a little disillusioned with the youth culture of the time. I intended that the picture be sympathetic toward our lead gang of kids yet, at the same time, I wanted to show that I was beginning to suspect that all of the ideas being spouted by the counter-culture and all of the dreams were not totally rooted in reality. In the picture, I wanted to literally give youth the world they desired and, then, make a cautionary statement about how youth might not be able to handle it as perfectly as they anticipated.

Corman said there were themes in the film "which go back through all my previous pictures, such as the theme of the destruction of the world which I've played with to a certain extent, and there are some certain political and religious overtones I've dealt with before but I've never put them all together like this. The film became something I firmly believe in."

He added in 1971 that Gas-s-s-s-s was:

An attempt to look at certain aspects of the youth movement and an attempt to move to a better way of life. It ends there with something I probably believe, which is that there is a struggle and that it is possible to overcome but not necessarily probable. It's not like some of the youth films that have come out in the last couple of years that have been an unquestioning acceptance of all the values of the youth culture. I've just been around too long to accept anything unquestioningly. This would be a kind of questioning acceptance of many of the values but not all of this culture. For that reason I'm not certain Gasss will be a success...Also the film is a little flawed in some areas.

Filming ultimately took around four weeks. Corman sold the film to American International Pictures for its negative cost.

=== Editing disagreements ===
Corman and AIP wound up having a major disagreement over the editing of the film. He later wrote in his memoirs:

I ended the film with a spectacular shot from on top of the mesa, with a view sixty, seventy miles to the horizon ... God, who was a running character throughout the film, made his final comments on what went on...There must have been three hundred people on top of that mesa. It was one of the greatest shots I ever achieved in my life. And AIP cut out the entire shot. They ended the picture on the couple's cliched kiss – because they didn't like what God was saying. The picture ended and made no sense... Final cut approval had never been put in writing at AIP. It was more a tacit agreement...AIP had grown into the biggest independent in the U.S. It was now a publicly held company. The more irreverent the film, the greater the financial risk...Jim [Nicholson] had grown conservative and it was his objections to my work that led to the cuts. Jim had done this on four films in a row. [Gas-s-s-s was] the one that really did it for me.

Corman elaborated, saying:

[God was] played by an actor with an outrageous New York Jewish accent and they were really startled by that. But cutting God really took the heart out of the picture. I think it was partially the fact that AIP had become a public company and Sam [Arkoff] was Jewish and they didn't want to be accused of being anti-Semitic.

However, Samuel Z. Arkoff of AIP recalled it differently:

When Roger left for Europe to shoot Von Richthofen and Brown for United Artists, he turned over the rough cut to us. Jim [Nicholson] and I viewed it, and realized it needed substantial work. We so informed Roger, who didn't disagree...Roger's handpicked editors eliminated lines, entire scenes, and even one of the leading characters in the film. They also cut out a final shot that Roger adored, in which he positioned the leading man, his lady, and three hundred extras on a mesa...The camera panned back while the words of God were heard in a voice-over. For some reason, the voice of God had an accent. Roger thought it was one of the most spectacular shots of his film career. The editors thought it belonged on the cutting room floor, which was right where they left it...We had tried, but the editors just couldn't save the picture.

== Reception ==
Corman says the film opened at the Edinburgh Film Festival and he "got a cable from the organizers of the festival saying, "gasss explodes. Five minutes standing ovation." I thought, "Boy, I've really got one."

The film premiered in New York as part of a retrospective on Roger Corman's work.

In 1971, Corman stated:

AIP hates the picture. They dislike it intensely and they would not give it a New York opening. Since it's a very inexpensive picture, they've been playing it around the country in drive-ins and small towns where it's been doing only moderate business. The projection is that it will break even and possibly make a tiny profit. They don't want to spend the money to open in New York because it's very expensive to open right in New York. They feel it will not do well here and will turn a possibly slight loser into a slight failure. Because of the retrospective we have an essentially free opening here. However, I'm not quite as optimistic about the picture as I was after the news of the Edinburgh Festival. The fact that its been playing around to only moderate audiences may indicate some weaknesses in the film. On the other hand, it could mean that it's been playing to the wrong audiences.

According to Samuel Z. Arkoff, "when Gas-s-s-s was released, it was promoted with ads that proclaimed, 'Invite a few friends over to watch the end of the world.' The picture didn't make any money."

Corman later reflected:

One of the great problems is that the film is far too intellectual. Other people have told me that they think it's a meaningless film. They may well be both right. It is the most intricate and the most organized intellectual film that I have ever made. I was so careful to keep each concept deep behind a humorous look at it. I didn't want at any time to allow the preachings of what I was saying to come across too heavily and disturb the flow of the picture and its humor. In my desire to keep it in the background, I may have kept it so far in the background that I'm the only person who is going to know what is in every scene.

It was the last film Corman directed for AIP, and he only made one more movie before a 20-year sabbatical. "A great deal of care went into what I was saying and how I was going to say it", "he said of Gas-s-s-s. "The finished picture does not evidently make all these points. It discourages me and so for a little while I prefer to step away...Directing is very hard and very painful. Producing is easy. I can do it without really thinking about it." Corman did, however, go on to produce Boxcar Bertha and Unholy Rollers for AIP.

=== Legacy ===
Gas-s-s-s found a fresh audience on late night television in the 1980s. In 2005, it was issued on DVD as a Midnite Movies double feature with Wild in the Streets (1968), another AIP movie.

Filmink argued "the film’s a mess, to be told, but often funny and fascinating for Corman watchers because it summarises so much of his career until that date: there’s references to Westerns, Edgar Allan Poe, the apocalypse, sex, progressive politics, bikers, race relations, rape."

== Soundtrack ==
A soundtrack for the film was released in 1970 on American International Records. It was produced by Barry Melton. Country Joe and The Fish minus Country Joe appear as "Johnny & The Tornados". The band Joy Of Cooking appears as The Gourmet's Delight.

The tracks were:

- A1 Robert Corff – 'I’m Looking For A World' (composer B. Melton) 2:07
- A2 The Gourmet’s Delight – 'First Time, Last Time' (T. Brown) 2:25
- A3 Robert Corff – 'Please Don’t Bury My Soul' (B. Melton) 1:18
- A4 Johnny & The Tornados – 'Cry A Little' (Melton*, Metzler, Dewey, Kapner) 1:12
- A5 Robert Corff -'Maybe It Really Wasn’t Love' (B. Melton) 2:32
- A6 Johnny & The Tornados – 'Juke Box Serenade' (Melton, Dewey, Kapner) 3:28
- A7 Johnny & The Tornados – 'Castles' - (Garthwaite, Brown) 2:25
- B1 Robert Corff – 'World That We All Dreamed Of' (J. McDonald) 1:41
- B2 The Gourmet’s Delight – 'Today Is Where' (T. Brown) 1:24
- B3 Robert Corff – 'Don’t Chase Me Around' (B. Melton) 1:47
- B4 Johnny & The Tornados – 'The Pueblo Pool' (B. Melton) 1:45
- B5 Johnny & The Tornados – 'Gas Man' (Melton*, Metzler*, Dewey*, Kapner*) 1:40
- B6 Robert Corff– 'Got To Get Movin’' - Written By – B. Melton* 1:26
- B7 Johnny & The Tornados – 'Bubble Gum Girl' (Melton*, Metzler*, Dewey*, Kapner*) 1:47
- B8 Robert Corff –' This Is The Beginning' (B. Melton) 2:45

== See also ==
- List of American films of 1970
- List of apocalyptic and post-apocalyptic fiction
