= Stephanie Rothman =

American film director

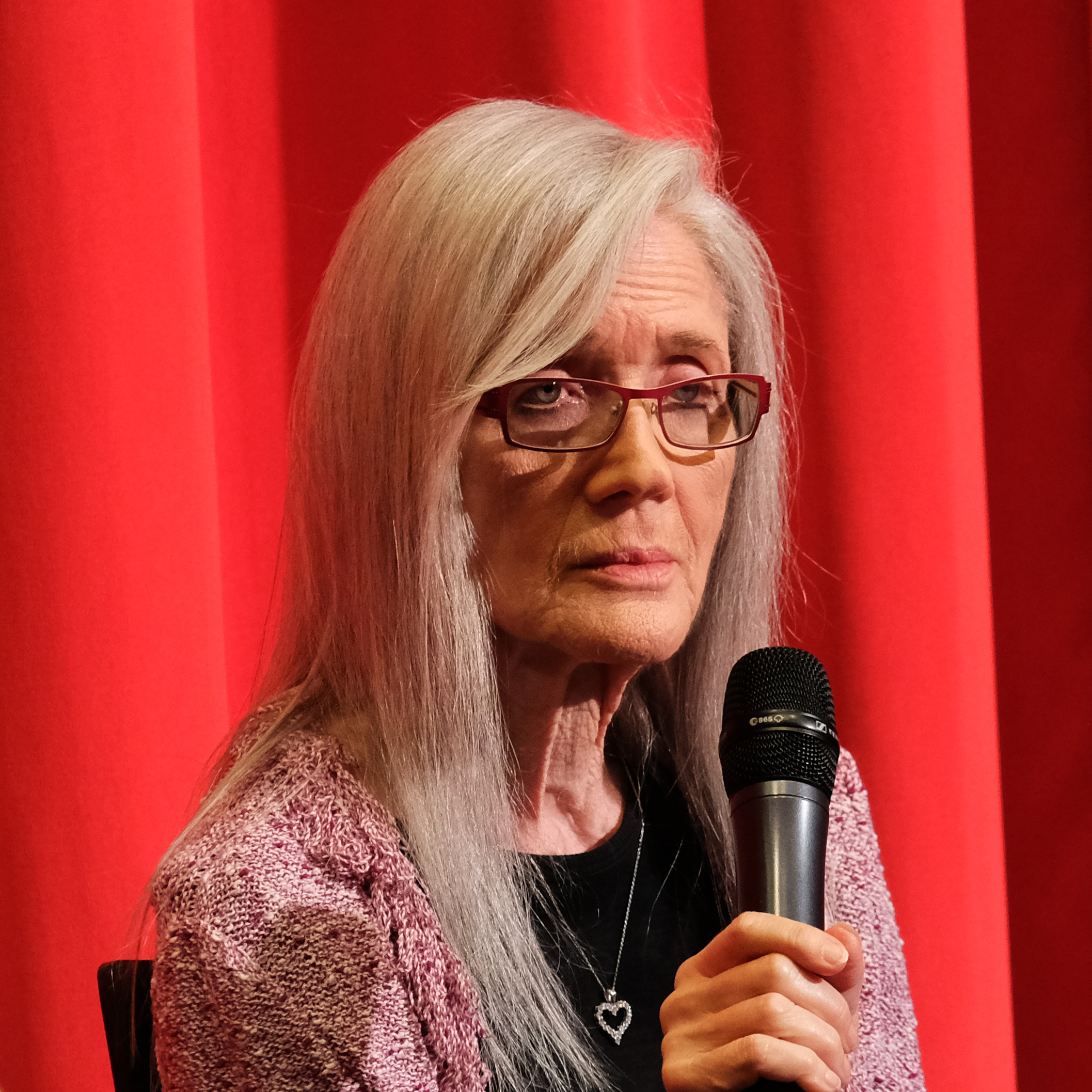
- Rothman in 2024
- Born: November 9, 1936 (age 89); Paterson, New Jersey, U.S.
- Education: University of California, Berkeley; University of Southern California
- Occupations: Film director; producer; screenwriter
- Years active: 1965–1978

Stephanie Rothman (born November 9, 1936) is an American film director, producer, and screenwriter, known for her low-budget independent exploitation films made in the 1960s and 1970s, especially The Student Nurses (1970) and Terminal Island (1974).

== Biography ==
=== Early life ===
Born in Paterson, New Jersey, Rothman was raised in Los Angeles after her family relocated there in 1945. She studied sociology at the University of California, Los Angeles for two years before transferring to the University of California, Berkeley. She says she became interested in filmmaking after seeing The Seventh Seal (1957), "what is still my favorite film of all time... I didn't, at that point, know how to become a filmmaker. I didn't even think it was possible. When I saw it I thought to myself, 'This is what I would like to do. I would like to make a film like this.' Highly thoughtful, European-like, [laughs] small films. I wanted to be a writer-director."

=== Roger Corman ===
From 1960 to 1963, Rothman studied filmmaking at the University of Southern California where she met her husband, filmmaker Charles S. Swartz. She was mentored by the chairman of the cinema department, Bernard Cantor. She became the first woman to be awarded the Directors Guild of America fellowship, awarded annually to the director of a student film. This, along with her academic qualifications, garnered her a job offer from Roger Corman in 1964, to work as his assistant. (Corman chose her over another applicant, who later became his wife Julie.)

"It was rare for anyone who did not have family connections to find employment in the film industry, in or outside of the jurisdiction of the labor unions", recalled Rothman later. "It was even rarer for a woman to be hired. It was traditional to exclude us from nearly all types of work behind the camera."

Rothman worked in a variety of jobs for Corman, on films such as Beach Ball (1965), Voyage to the Prehistoric Planet (1965), and Queen of Blood (1966). Rothman:

I did everything: write new scenes, scout locations, cast actors, direct new sequences and edit final cuts. It was a busy, exhilarating time. Roger did not teach me these skills, I learned them in film school. But he did share his greater experience with me, giving me useful criticism and, equally important, information on how to efficiently organize work on the set so that a film could be shot on schedule. The schedules he set were much shorter than those of the major studios. Since it was his own money he was using, Roger did not want a film to go either over schedule or over budget. He also taught me a valuable lesson in psychology: he encouraged me, often expressing his confidence in my abilities, and I therefore tried to do the best work for him that I could.

Corman had Rothman reshoot large segments of the movie that became Blood Bath (1966). "I shot about another 30 minutes of original footage and it was made into what I can only call...a mish-mosh", she recalls. "Unintended joint collaboration would be a more accurate way of putting it. [laughs]" She and Jack Hill share directorial credit for the film.

=== It's a Bikini World ===
Her work impressed Corman enough to give her her first full directing job on It's a Bikini World (shot in 1965 but not released until 1967), which he financed. However she did not enjoy the experience:

I became very depressed after making It's a Bikini World. I had very ambivalent feelings about continuing to be a director if that was all I was going to be able to do. So I literally went into a kind of retirement for several years until more than anything in the world, I wanted to make films.

Rothman tried to find work elsewhere but was unable to. She returned to filmmaking on Corman's comedy Gas-s-s-s (1970), working as production associate. "I had a wonderful time working on that film. I loved it, I really did."

=== The Student Nurses ===
In 1970, Corman established his new production and distribution company New World Pictures and hired Rothman to write and direct its second film, The Student Nurses (1970), about the adventures of four young nursing students. Although an exploitation movie, Rothman was given creative freedom to explore political and social issues which interested her such as abortion and immigration. The Student Nurses was a considerable hit, leading to a cycle of "nurse" films and helping establish New World as a viable commercial force.

Rothman says when she made the film, she was unaware it was an "exploitation" film" until she read a review describing it as such:

I had never heard that term before. Roger never used it. So that's how I learned that I had made an exploitation film. Then I went and did some research to find out exactly what exploitation films were, their history and so forth, and then I knew that's what I was doing, because I was making low-budget films that were transgressive in that they showed more extreme things than what would be shown in a studio film, and whose success depended on their advertising, because they had no stars in them. It was dismaying to me, but at the same time I decided to make the best exploitation films I could. If that was going to be my lot, then that's what I was going to try and do with it.

=== The Velvet Vampire ===
Rothman turned down Corman's offer to make both a sequel to Student Nurses and a woman in prison film, The Big Doll House (1971) because she was not enthusiastic about either project. Instead she directed The Velvet Vampire (1971) for New World which has become a cult hit, although it was a commercial disappointment.

=== Dimension Pictures ===
Rothman and her husband left Corman in the early 1970s to help set up Dimension Pictures. While there she did not receive greater creative freedom or the opportunity to leave the exploitation field – however, she did receive more money and owned a small share of the company.

Rothman said Roger Corman "paid people very little and [Charles and I] had to make a living. We were offered better pay at Dimension Pictures, so we left for Dimension. The pull for that was economic. It was not ideological. Roger is ideologically quite progressive, but when it comes to money he is much more cautious."

Rothman directed three films for Dimension, Group Marriage (1972), Terminal Island (1973) and The Working Girls (1974). She also wrote the script for Beyond Atlantis (1973), supervised the re-editing of The Sins of Adam and Eve for the US market, and had creative input on Sweet Sugar.

The films that Rothman directed – Group Marriage in particular – placed emphasis on female as well as male desire. Rothman stated in a 1973 interview that:

I'm very tired of the whole tradition in western art in which women are always presented nude and men aren't. I'm not going to dress women and undress men – that would be a form of tortured vengeance. But I certainly am going to undress men, and the result is probably a more healthy environment, because one group of people presenting another in a vulnerable, weaker, more servile position is always distorted.

Film director and historian Fred Olen Ray later claimed that the best movies made by Dimension were the in-house productions from Rothman and Swartz. Rothman:

I didn't always get to choose the subjects of the film, but I did have control over the attitude toward and the treatment of the subjects. In this respect, I didn't feel compromised or constrained. Of course there were certain audience expectations that had to be satisfied, in particular for nudity and violence. Since I was making exploitation films with unknown casts, I had to show more nudity than they could ordinarily see in major studio films, but less than in the soft porn that was then in release. Furthermore, I had to show up to the limit of what was allowed in an R-rated film (i.e., no pubic hair, no genitals, no simulated intercourse), which looks quite tame by today's standards, but wasn't at the time. Because of these scenes I also had to cast very attractive people, which meant that sometimes I couldn't cast the best actors, which I considered a very serious constraint then, and which continues to disturb me even now [in 2010].

Rothman says she was influenced by the work of Jean Cocteau and Georges Franju.

=== Later career ===
Rothman and Swartz left Dimension in 1975. She almost directed a film for AIP which was going to be produced by Lou Arkoff but the project fell over. She tried to break out of the exploitation field, but struggled.

I had good agents and together we tried very hard to get me work, but we repeatedly discovered I was stigmatized by the films I had made. The irony was that I made them in order to prove that I had the skills to make more ambitious films, but no one would give me the chance. Then there was the other reason, the so-called elephant in the room: I was a woman. No one told me directly, but I often learned indirectly that this was the decisive reason why many producers wouldn't agree to meet me. If that sounds exaggerated, remember that I worked in the American film industry from 1965 to 1974, and some of those years I was the only woman directing feature films.

She later elaborated:

I couldn't get any work in television. No one would even meet me... When it came to feature films, I was once invited by an executive at MGM to go and meet her, which was in the days when there were very few female filmmakers at all. I went and met her and she said to me, "We were in a story meeting yesterday. We're getting a new script ready for a first time director who we want to use and we were talking about the fact that we would like it to be a vampire film. Something, you know, like The Velvet Vampire that Stephanie Rothman made." My response when I heard that was, "Well, if you want a vampire film like Stephanie Rothman made, why don't you get Stephanie Rothman?"

Rothman sold a script, Carhops, which was later filmed as Starhops (1978), but it was changed to such a degree that Rothman took her name off it. There are stories that she re-shot sections of Ruby (1977) but Rothman says these are not true. Curtis Harrington did say she shot some additional scenes for the TV relief. Rothman did sign a three-picture deal with a producer but no films resulted.

In 1978 Rothman said she still hoped "to make a major motion picture. I never give up hoping... If I hang in there long enough my time will come." However she is not credited on a feature film after 1978.

She later reflected:

For the next 10 years, I tried to find work making more ambitious films. My husband and I collaborated on a couple of challenging treatments and scripts that were well received, but never sold. I did sell a few options on scripts and screenplays on my own. I got a few offers to make more exploitation films, but I was never happy making them and I didn't want to repeat myself. After enduring a decade of barely making a living, I gave up.

Rothman ended up leaving the industry. She says, "for a few years I ran a small proto-union for a group of University of California professors, doing their lobbying and writing a political newsletter about labor issues of concern to them. Then, starting with a small inheritance, I began to invest in commercial real estate."

Rothman says she looks back on her career with:

Satisfaction and regret. Regret that I couldn't have made more films. Regret that I couldn't have made films that gave me a larger platform unto which to work in terms of finances, in terms of not having certain obligations to a certain kind of audience, to just to make a film that was dear to my heart in every respect. Not that the films I made don't have aspects that are very dear to my heart, I mean, they're not the complete films I would have liked to have made.

== Acclaim ==
"I was never happy making exploitation films", said Rothman later. "I did it because it was the only way I could work." However her movies have come to receive much critical appraisal, particularly from feminist writers such as Pam Cook and Claire Johnson. She was honoured with a retrospective at the 2007 Vienna International Film Festival.

== Legacy ==
Feminist writers, especially Pam Cook and Claire Johnson, have noted Rothman's role creating feminist films in the exploitation genre. Cook stated that:

Rothman often parodied the codes of exploitation genres to expose their roots in male fantasies and so undermine them, and it is this use of formal play to subvert male myths of women that has interested some feminists and that, it has been argued, places Rothman's work inside the tradition of women's counter cinema.

Terry Curtis Fox stated that:

Without stretching a point too greatly, one can see the influence of this feminism in such recurrent Rothman themes as the reorganization of society and the extension of options to otherwise disenfranchised individuals. A classic liberal, Rothman states her themes wholly in terms of disparate individuals whose needs propel them to make a common bond. Despite a growing bitterness in her later work, Rothman's films are not so much a cinema of social problems as one of social solutions. More than anything else (and perhaps even more commercially damning than working in restrictive genres), Rothman's films are contemporary comedies of manners, centered around attitudes, around the way that style serves as both an expression of and a screen for meaning. She may be a graduate of the Roger Corman School of Filmmaking, but her real model is Preston Sturges.

In addition, Rothman also used her movies to comment on social issues of their time, like abortion in The Student Nurses.

Rothman later said of her work that:

A Stephanie Rothman film deals with questions of self-determination. My characters try to forge a humane and rational way of coming to terms with the vicissitudes of existence. My films are not always about succeeding but they are always concerned with fighting the good fight.

She later reflected:

How do I think the balance between genre constraints and creative freedom influenced my work? There was always a struggle in my mind between the two. I would have covered the same topics, but made the films very differently, if I had not had these constraints. I knew it then. But I tried not to be discouraged and... I tried to do the best I could... While I do not object to violence or nudity in principle, the reason audiences came to see these low-budget films without stars was because they delivered scenes that you could not see in major studio films or more supposedly ambitious independent American films... Exploitation films required multiple nude scenes and crude, frequent violence. My struggle was to try to dramatically justify such scenes and to make them transgressive, but not repulsive. I tried to control this through the style in which I shot scenes. That was one of my greatest pleasures, determining how my style of shooting could enhance the content of a scene. Comedy was another method of control I used. I have always enjoyed writing and directing comedy– I was, in fact, more comfortable working in a comic idiom than a dramatic one–and so I also used comedy to modulate a scene's tone. Visual style and comic invention were my personal salvation or... the "special opportunity" to escape what troubled me about the exploitation genre.

== Filmography ==
- Beach Ball (1965) – associate producer
- Voyage to the Prehistoric Planet (1965) – associate producer
- Queen of Blood (1966) – associate producer
- Blood Bath (1966) – co-director
- It's a Bikini World (1967) – director, co-writer
- Gas-s-s-s (1970) – production associate
- The Student Nurses (1970) – director, writer
- The Velvet Vampire (1971) – director, writer
- Group Marriage (1972) – director, writer
- Beyond Atlantis (1973) – writer
- Terminal Island (1973) – director
- The Working Girls (1974) – director
- Starhops (1978) – writer

=== Unmade films ===
- Outlaw Mama – script by Rothman announced in 1971 for production by New World
- Mama Sweetlife – project announced for Dimension but never made

== Sources ==
- Scott, A. O. "Stephanie Rothman profile". The New York Times.
- Collings, Jane. "Interview of Stephanie Rothman" (PDF). UCLA Library Center for Oral History Research.
- Kozma, Alicia (2022). The Cinema of Stephanie Rothman: Radical Acts in Filmmaking. Jackson, Mississippi: Univ. of Mississippi Press. ISBN 978-1-496-84103-2.
