= Night Call Nurses =

1972 film by Jonathan Kaplan

- Theatrical release poster
- Directed by: Jonathan Kaplan
- Written by: George Armitage; Danny Opatoshu (uncredited); Jon Davison (uncredited)
- Produced by: Julie Corman
- Starring: Patty Byrne; Alana Hamilton
- Production company: New World Pictures
- Release date: June 1, 1972
- Running time: 78 minutes
- Country: United States
- Language: English
- Budget: $75,000 or $115,000
- Box office: $1 million

Night Call Nurses is a 1972 American sex comedy film directed by Jonathan Kaplan. It is the third in Roger Corman's "nurses" cycle of films, starting with The Student Nurses (1970).

Quentin Tarantino called it "a sexy version of Three Coins in the Fountain."

== Plot ==
Three young nurses work in a psych ward at a hospital. Barbara comes under the influence of a charismatic sex therapist and is stalked by a mysterious nurse. Janis has an affair with a truck-driving patient who is addicted to drugs. Sandra becomes politicized through an affair with a black militant and helps a prisoner escape from the hospital.

== Cast ==
- Patty Byrne as Barbara
- Alana Hamilton as Janis
- Mittie Lawrence as Sandra
- Clint Kimbrough as Dr. Bramlett
- Felton Perry as Jude
- Stack Pierce as Sampson
- Richard Young as Kyle Toby
- Martin Ashe as Bathrobe Benny
- Bob Brogan as George
- Tris Coffin as Miles Bailey
- Dennis Dugan as Kit
- Lynne Guthrie as Cynthia
- Bobby Hall as Warden Kelley
- Barbara Keene as Chloe
- Christopher Law as Zach
- Dick Miller as driver

== Production ==
Corman offered the film to Kaplan on the recommendation of Martin Scorsese, who had recently made Boxcar Bertha for Corman and had taught Kaplan at New York University. Kaplan's student film Stanley had just won a prize at the National Student Film Festival and he was working as an editor in New York. Kaplan says that when Corman called offering him the job Kaplan thought it was a joke and hung up but when Corman called back Kaplan realised it was genuine. The director flew out to Los Angeles to meet Corman.

Corman allowed Kaplan to rewrite the script, and to cast and edit the film. Kaplan says the only lead member of the cast selected when he came on board was then-model Alana Hamilton. Kaplan was told he "had to find a role for Dick Miller, show a Bulova watch, and use a Jensen automobile in the film." Kaplan had never seen a nurses film so Corman told him the formula. "Exploitation of male sexual fantasy, a comedic subplot, action and violence, and a slightly-to-the-left-of-center social subplot. And these were the four elements that were required in the nurses pictures," said Kaplan.

The director says Corman "explained that there would be three nurses: a blonde, a brunette, and a nurse of colour; that the nurse of color would be involved in a political subplot, the brunette would be involved in the kinky subplot, and the blonde would be the comedy subplot Kaplan remembered "the conversation ending like this: ‘The film is called Night Call Nurses. At present we don’t have “night call nurses” in the dialogue. I want you to work it in. I want frontal nudity from the waist up. Total nudity from behind. No pubic hair. This is my wife, Julie [who was to produce the film] . Go off and rewrite the script. Goodbye.’" Kaplan says his total fee was $2,000 plus a round trip ticket.

Kaplan brought out Jon Davison and Danny Opatoshu from New York to help him work on the script; both men paid their own way to Los Angeles and worked for nothing. "That was the best offer I'd ever had," said Davison later, adding that after the rewrite, "It was still a terrible script." (Davison went to work for Corman full time after Night Call Nurses and Opatoshu wrote several more scripts for him.) The film was shot in 15 days (other accounts say 13). Barbara Peeters was production manager.

Julie Corman had only produced one previous film Boxcar Bertha and said "I was on edge for the entire shoot of Night Call Nurses... I realized how many things could ruin the day shooting, like an actor not showing up, or an inappropriate prop. Thankfully, at the end of the day, when Roger asked, “Did you get the day’s work?”, we did."

Kaplan recalls Julie Corman and he "were in the same boat. She’s a good Catholic girl—she was kind of humiliated by the subject. At one point during casting, Roger wanted us to have the girls take off their tops—not so much to show us their breasts but more to make sure that they’re not going to freak out on the day they have shoot nudity. Julie would have to leave the room. On the day we had to shoot our first nude scene, one of the actresses didn’t want to do it. So Roger said to drive along the Sunset Strip at night and get a skanky hooker and bring her in and have her do it—and that implied threat would make the actress reconsider. I couldn’t do it. And Julie said, ‘You don’t have to, we’ll just tell him we did it.’"

Kaplan says every Friday they would show what they had filmed to Roger Corman. "He would take very neat notes on a yellow legal pad, and then we’d go back to his house and he’d go through the notes. The first time he had maybe thirty notes and fifteen were fine and fifteen I didn't want to do. He was totally charming about it. He said "I know you don’t want to do this, but you’ll just have to chalk it up to the avarice of your capitalist producer.’"

Kaplan says Corman was "a terrific teacher" who constantly gave good tips about how to film more efficiently.

== Reception ==
Julie Corman said the film "made a lot of money."

Kaplan says after filming had finished "I didn’t talk to him [Corman] again for a while. Then Julie called me and said, ‘We’re a big hit in Tallahassee! Roger wants you to come out and make the same movie, but with teachers instead of nurses.’ That's how I got The Student Teachers."

Kaplan says Corman's brother Gene liked the way the director handled the black subplot on Night Call Nurses and hired him for a blaxploitation film, The Slams.

Kaplan later recalled "There's some stuff in Night Call Nurses that's so stupid and so dumb, I just get a warm feeling thinking about it. It's so silly and sweet and naive and awful."

== Critical responses ==
Kenneth Thomas of the Los Angeles Times had called Private Duty Nurses "an unexpected pleasure" and hoped "for something equally creditable with the companie's newest 'nursie'" but felt Night Call Nurses "was mere ludicrous trash" although it "at least has the decency to be funny."

Writing for Turner Classic Movies, critic Nathaniel Thompson described the film as "all good fun" and "while the actresses aren't quite up to caliber [...] they're still strong, beautiful, and brave enough to keep the sometimes random chain of events grooving along just fine." Critic Budd Wilkins wrote in Slant Magazine that the film "boasts a strong storyline, lots of quirky humor, and a wooly, anything-goes visual style," with director "Kaplan [using] rapid editing, jerky handheld camerawork, and a vertiginous, downward-spiraling crane shot to place viewers in discordant POV perspectives." Writing in DVD Talk, Ian Jane described the film as "pretty gosh darned shallow but offers up enough cheap sexy thrills to make for some solid B-grade entertainment" and that it "mixes up the frequent nudity you'd expect with a few interesting horror movie elements."

Writing for Filmink critic Stephen Vagg called it "comfortably the second best in the series. It’s energetic, flashy entertainment, where there’s lots of crazy editing and scenes with non-synchronous dialogue... the women have real camaraderie, and you get the sense that they are friends...It helps that the cast is very strong."

== See also ==
- List of American films of 1972
