= It's a Bikini World =

1967 film by Stephanie Rothman

- Theatrical release poster
- Directed by: Stephanie Rothman
- Written by: Stephanie Rothman; Charles S. Swartz
- Produced by: Charles S. Swartz
- Starring: Deborah Walley; Tommy Kirk; Bobby Pickett; Suzie Kaye; The Animals; The Castaways; The Toys; The Gentrys
- Cinematography: Alan Stensvold
- Edited by: Leo H. Shreve
- Music by: Mike Curb; Bob Summers
- Distributed by: Trans American Films
- Release date: April 14, 1967
- Running time: 86 minutes
- Country: United States
- Language: English

It's a Bikini World is a 1967 American musical comedy film starring Tommy Kirk, Deborah Walley and Bobby Pickett. The film features cameos by the music groups the Gentrys, the Animals, Pat & Lolly Vegas, the Castaways and R&B girl group the Toys. Featuring a pro-feminist plotline, it is the only film in the beach party genre to be directed by a woman (Stephanie Rothman).

This film, along with Catalina Caper (which also starred Tommy Kirk), is among the last of the beach party films. The mainstay of the once-popular genre was the series of films by American International Pictures (AIP), starting with the surprise hit Beach Party in 1963 and ending with The Ghost in the Invisible Bikini in 1966.

Although AIP picked up distribution, It's a Bikini World was not an AIP film. It was produced and originally distributed by Trans American Films under the title The Girl in Daddy's Bikini. A new 35-mm print with this title was screened at the American Cinematheque in Hollywood on August 1, 2009.

== Plot ==
Young surfer, local beach jock and ladies' man Mike Samson meets Delilah Dawes. At first, he tries to add her to his collection of women, but she rejects him because she finds him chauvinistic and shallow, so he disguises himself as a nerdy twin brother named Herbert.

Publisher Harvey Pulp plans to start a new magazine called Teen Scream. To publicize the venture, he joins forces with Daddy, a car, surfboard and skateboard customizer and owner of local music club The Dungeon. Pulp and Daddy organize a series of contests, and Delilah competes against Mike with the encouragement of Mike's fake brother and alternate identity Herbert in various events, and loses each time. However, Mike finds that he is falling in love with her. Delilah finds out about the deception. The two compete in a final race using various vehicles.

== Cast ==
- Deborah Walley as Delilah Dawes
- Tommy Kirk as Mike / Herbert Samson
- Bob Pickett as Woody
- Suzie Kaye as Pebbles
- Jack Bernardi as Harvey Pulp
- William O'Connell as McSnigg
- Jim Begg as Boy
- Lori Williams as Girl
- Pat McGee as Cindy
- Sid Haig as Daddy
- The Animals as Themselves – Rock Group
- The Toys as Themselves – Rock Group
- The Gentrys as Themselves – Rock Group
- The Castaways as Themselves – Rock Group

== Production ==
It's a Bikini World was partly financed by Roger Corman, who disliked musicals on the whole but invested in some beach movies such as this and Beach Ball. He hired his protégé Stephanie Rothman to direct and Rothman's husband Charles S. Swartz to produce, and Rothman and Swartz co-wrote the script. Rothman said "This was one of the last beach pictures made, possibly the last. I doubt that anyone ever chose to make a beach picture because they were attracted to the genre. I certainly didn't. It was simply my first chance to make a feature film."

Rothman later stated her rationale for the script:

Girls in beach pictures were usually very passive. The idea that she would assume her athletic prowess could be as good as his was very alien. We wanted a story in which the two characters each had a very strong sense of self-esteem: the boy not wanting to admit that the girl could be as worthy as he, the girl not willing to let him believe that he was better than her.

The movie was originally entitled The Girl in Daddy's Bikini. In October, 1965 Kirk signed on to do the film, which then was to be released by Paramount. He had just finished Ghost in the Invisible Bikini with Deborah Walley who was also hired.

=== Filming ===
It's a Bikini World was filmed in November 1965 but not released until the spring of 1967. The fact that the film was shot off-season (when the beaches were less crowded, which was typical for beach party films) is noticeable from the foliage and the Hollywood Boulevard Christmas decorations appearing onscreen.

Trans American made an effort to copy AIP's style. Both Kirk and Walley had appeared in previous AIP films, Kirk in Pajama Party and Walley in both Beach Blanket Bingo and Ski Party, and they had just starred together in The Ghost in the Invisible Bikini. Bobby Pickett's character Woody, with his goofy hats and dim wit, is a riff on the character Deadhead/Bonehead that Jody McCrea portrayed in several of the AIP beach party films. Sid Haig's character of Daddy, with his Kustom Kulture design merchandise empire, is a take-off on Ed "Big Daddy" Roth, whose designs were tied to the AIP films as well. For example, Roth's trademark hat, the Hillbilly Crash Helmet, was worn by McCrea in a couple of AIP films, and Roth's Surfite custom car appears in AIP's Beach Blanket Bingo.

The role of Woody was originally offered to Aron Kincaid, who turned it down.

Pickett recalled Walley as being "flirtatious" and Rothman as "very sweet." Rothman said "“I thnk that it had pretty interesting photography for the time."

Shooting took place over the course of two weeks at a number of locations, including Malibu Beach and a theatre in the Palisades. The location used for Daddy's "dungeon" in the film is the notorious Hollywood Boulevard club The Haunted House, notable for its bizarre stage in the shape of the mouth of a giant fanged monster. The club also appears as the setting for Ted V. Mikels' go-go exploitation film Girl in Gold Boots, released a year later in 1968. Surfboards used in the film were provided by Hobie.

The Gentrys later recalled shooting their scene took "about three hours" and "was fun".

== Music ==
The Animals perform their hit "We Gotta Get out of This Place" and the teen garage band the Castaways perform their hit "Liar, Liar." The Toys perform "Attack," the Gentrys perform "Spread It on Thick" and Pat & Lolly Vegas perform "Walk On (Right Out of My Life)."

The soundtrack is by Mike Curb and features an early Moog synthesizer cut. The kinetic surf instrumental used over the opening and closing credits, and as a signature throughout the film, is by Bob Summers.

== Release ==
The film was released in April 1967, finding limited release in the big cities and mostly playing Southern drive-ins.

== Critical reception ==
According to a contemporary review, the film, which was playing on a double bill with Teenage Rebellion, "is filled with bikinis filled with girls, as advertised. It is also filled with combos who call themselves the Animals, The Castaways, The Gentrys and things like that. What it is not filled with is entertainment. Deborah Walley and Tommy Kirk work as hard as if they were in a really great film like Beach Blanket Bingo but director Stephanie (!) Rothman's efforts, I'm afraid, fall far short of that classic."

A review of the film in TV Guide describes it as "Not one of the better films in the 'Beach Party' genre," but that "[s]ome great 1960s bands [...] are featured." A modern review by Graeme Clark reported that the film "unintentionally has an oddly forlorn mood to its silliness," that it "had more of a proto-feminist theme to it than anything Frankie Avalon ever had to contend with from Annette Funicello," and that "[f]or nostalgists, this is a far more promising prospect for entertainment than anyone else, but that casual melancholy informs the proceedings, not something that would have struck many at the time." She tried to find work but was unable to Filmink called it "a movie with some incredible music, imaginative photography, likeable leads but not enough story."

Tommy Kirk later said that he was embarrassed by the movie. "It was ... basically the end of my career, one of the worst pieces of shit that I've ever been in in my life. I can't believe that I could be so stupid. Poor Deborah Walley, poor me."

Stephanie Rothman later said that she "became very depressed after making [the film]." She also said, "I had very ambivalent feelings about continuing to be a director if that was all I was going to be able to do. So I literally went into a kind of retirement for several years until more than anything in the world, I wanted to make films."

She did not want to make exploitation films but was unable to find any other work. Rothman went back to work with Corman on Gas which led to The Student Nurses.

== See also ==
- List of American films of 1967

== Sources ==
- Collings, Jane. "Interview of Stephanie Rothman" (PDF). UCLA Library Center for Oral History Research.
- Peary, Dannis (1977). "Stephanie Rothman R-rated Feminist". In Kay, Karyn; Peary, Gerald (eds.). Women and the cinema : a critical anthology. Dutton. pp. 179–192. ISBN 978-0-525-47459-3.
