= 21st Century Film Corporation =

Former theatrical distribution company

21st Century Film Corporation Inc.
- Industry: Distributor; Film; Theatrical
- Founded: July 25, 1976; 50 years ago (as 21st Century Distribution Corporation); April 19, 1989; 37 years ago (as 21st Century Film Corporation)
- Defunct: March 24, 1996; 30 years ago
- Fate: Bankruptcy and liquidation; assets acquired by Epic Productions via Consortium de Realisation.
- Headquarters: Los Angeles, United States
- Key people: Tom Ward; Art Schweitzer; Menahem Golan (CEO); Ami Artzi; Giancarlo Parretti
- Products: Motion pictures

21st Century Film Corporation Inc. was a theatrical distribution company formed sometime in the 1970s as a distributor and film production company. Menahem Golan was CEO of the company from 1989 to the company's bankruptcy.

== History ==
The company was formed by Tom Ward and Art Schweitzer around 1976 (though some sources claim it to be 1971) as a film production company and distributor. The company acquired most of the catalog of Dimension Pictures, after that company's bankruptcy in 1981. Along with theatrical distribution, 21st Century also released many films on home video, first via their short-lived label, Planet Video, from 1982 to 1983, and then through a more lucrative deal with Continental Video beginning in 1985.

In the late 1980s, while filing for bankruptcy, it was purchased by Giancarlo Parretti. Parretti had also recently purchased The Cannon Group, which was renamed Pathé Communications, and he eventually handed the newly rebranded 21st Century Film Corporation, along with the Spider-Man and Captain America film rights (held by Cannon), over to Israeli filmmaker Menahem Golan as part of Golan's severance package from Cannon. Golan's goal was to release high-quality motion pictures to the American and worldwide film audiences, but 21st Century only enjoyed small-scale success releasing low-budget films like Bullseye!, as well as remakes of The Phantom of the Opera and Night of the Living Dead.

In April 1989, Twenty-first Century Film and Pathé Communications ended their film production contract. As part of the termination, 21st Century Film received rights to two feature-length movies: the completed Mack the Knife, in production Phantom of the Opera plus other projects and scripts rights. With this Pathé would no longer have any financial obligations to 21st Century. Captain America was filmed and was given only a limited theatrical release worldwide. On May 17, 1989, 21st Century Film Corporation signed an agreement with Hoyts Corporation to serve a 20-film production and distribution agreement.

Looking for funding for the Spider-Man film was difficult; 21st Century sold the film's TV rights to Viacom, the home-video rights to Columbia and theatrical rights to Carolco. In 1993, Golan triggered a series of lawsuits for 21st Century over Spider-Man as he feared being pushed out. Bankruptcy followed within the year for the company. In 1995, the judge ruled that the Spider-Man film rights expired and reverted to Marvel, and Carolco had a quitclaim deed after being closed a year after. Meanwhile, all of 21st Century's film library and assets were acquired by Crédit Lyonnais, incorporating it into the bank's Epic film library. A year later, PolyGram Filmed Entertainment acquired the Epic library, then in 1998, Metro-Goldwyn-Mayer acquired the pre-1996 PolyGram library, and was incorporated into Orion Pictures. (Ironically, MGM had merged with Pathé/Cannon earlier and was a theatrical distributor of Carolco's films at the time).

In 1993, it released a few more movies including Deadly Heroes and most notably Death Wish V: The Face of Death, the last in the series and Charles Bronson's final theatrical film. Currently, the majority of 21st Century Film Corporation's film catalog is owned by MGM (with Orion holding the copyright), with the exception of Night of the Living Dead, which was distributed by Columbia Pictures. Paramount Pictures (inherited from Viacom), currently holds television and streaming rights to 21st Century library with Trifecta Entertainment & Media handling U.S. distribution.

== Filmography ==
=== 21st Century Distribution Corporation ===
The following are films produced and/or released by 21st Century while the company was headed by Tom Ward and Art Schweitzer.
Year	Title	Notes	Ref
1976	The Three Fantastic Supermen	English-dubbed release of 1967 film I Fantastici 3 $upermen.	
1976	The Demon Lover	Produced by 21st Century.	
1977	The Tormented	Also re-released as The Eerie Midnight Horror Show in 1980, on Planet Video in 1982 and Continental Video in 1985.	
1977	The Obsessed One (Operation Makonaima)	English-dubbed release of 1974 film.	
1980	The Student Body	Planet Video release, also licensed to Continental Video as a double feature with Jailbait Babysitter.	
1980	The Image of Bruce Lee (猛男大賊脂虎)	English-dubbed release of 1978 film.	
1980	Fist of Fury Part Two (精武門續集)	English-dubbed release of 1977 film.	
1980	Black Belt Fury (森山虎)	English-dubbed release of 1974 film. Also known as Tiger Jungle.	
1980	Covert Action	English-dubbed release of 1978 film.	
1980	Return of the Tiger (大圈套)	English-dubbed release of 1978 film.	
1980	Snake Fist vs. the Dragon (猴形扣手)	English-dubbed release of 1979 film.	
1980	Suicide Cult	Re-release of 1975 film The Astrologer.	
1980	I Go Pogo	A stop-motion animated feature based on the Pogo comic strip.	
1980	Cathy's Curse		
1980	The Dragon vs. Needles of Death (龍虎鳳)	English-dubbed release of 1976 film. Also released on Planet Video and Continental Video as a double feature release with Snake Fist Ninja (see Snake Fist Fighter).	
1981	Fighting Mad	Planet Video release of 1978 film Death Force.	
1981	Lunatic	Re-release of 1971 film The Night Visitor.	
1981	Deliver Us from Evil	Re-release of 1975 film. Previously released by Dimension Pictures in 1975 under same title, and re-released as Joey in 1977.	
1981	Challenge the Dragon (猛虎闖關)	Planet Video release of 1974 film, also licensed to Continental Video in 1986 under the title Dragon Lady Ninja as a double feature with Devil Killer (see The Deadly Kung Fu Factor).	
1981	Terminal Island	Re-release of 1973 film. Previously released by Dimension Pictures in 1973.	
1981	Snake Fist Fighter (刁手怪招)	English-dubbed release of 1973 film, with additional scenes filmed in 1978.	
1981	Bruce Lee's Deadly Kung Fu (詠春截拳)	English-dubbed release of 1976 film.	
1981	The Muthers	Re-release of 1976 film, on a bill with Snake Fist Fighter in May 1981 and in December 1981 on a double bill with Group Marriage.	
1981	Four-Play	Re-release of 1977 film. Also known as Take Time to Smell The Flowers.	
1981	The Iron Dragon Strikes Back (匯峰號黃金大風暴)	English-dubbed release of 1979 film.	
1981	Nightmare		
1981	Group Marriage	Re-release of 1973 film, on a double bill with '’The Muthers'’.	
1981	Dr. Minx	Re-release of 1975 film on a double bill with Cheering Section. Previously released by Dimension Pictures in 1975.	
1981	Cheering Section	Re-release of 1977 film on a double bill with Dr. Minx. Previously released by Dimension Pictures in 1977.	
1982	The Bruce Lee Connection	English-dubbed release.	
1982	Kung Fu Fury	English-dubbed release.	
1982	Fist Like Lee, Part II	English-dubbed release.	
1982	To the Devil a Daughter	Planet Video release of 1976 film.	
1982	Dragon Force (虎林四大通関)	Planet Video release of 1978 film.	
1982	Battle Force	Planet Video release. Previously released by Dimension Pictures as The Greatest Battle in 1979.	
1982	Aida	Re-release of 1953 Italian film.	
1982	Revenge of the Shogun Women (十三女尼)	English-dubbed release of 1977 film. Also known as 13 Golden Nuns.	
1982	Return of Bruce (忠烈精武門)	English-dubbed release of 1977 film.	
1982	Fun Loving	Re-release of 1970 film Quackser Fortune Has a Cousin in the Bronx.	
1982	The Phantom of Terror	Re-release of 1970 film The Bird with the Crystal Plumage.	
1982	Giselle	English-dubbed release of 1980 film.	
1982	Blood Tide		
1982	The Slayer	Planet Video release, also licensed to Continental Video as a double feature with Scalps.	
1983	Magnificent Bodyguard (飛渡捲雲山)	English-dubbed release of 1978 film.	
1983	The Deadly Spawn	Also released as Return of the Aliens: The Deadly Spawn.	
1983	Jackie Chan and the 36 Crazy Fists (三十六迷形拳)	English-dubbed release of 1977 film.	
1983	Flying Masters of Kung Fu (一代天嬌)	English-dubbed release of 1979 film. Also known as Revengeful Swordswoman.	
1983	City of the Walking Dead	English-dubbed release of 1980 film. Also known as Nightmare City.	
1983	War of the Wizards	English-dubbed release of 1978 film. Also known as The Phoenix.	
1983	Scalps	Also licensed to Continental Video as a double feature VHS release with The Slayer.	
1984	American Beauty Hostages	Continental Video release of 1976 film. Previously released by Dimension Pictures as Ebony, Ivory & Jade in 1976.	
1984	Vampire Hookers	Continental Video release of 1978 film.	
1984	Legend of Black Thunder Mountain	Continental Video release of 1979 film.	
1984	Escape from Women's Prison	English-dubbed release of 1978 film. Licensed to Continental Video as a double feature VHS release with Sweet Sugar.	
1984	The Executioner Part II	Also licensed to Continental Video as a double feature VHS release with Frozen Scream. There is no part I.	
1984	Frozen Scream	Continental Video release of 1975 film as a double feature with Executioner Part II.	
1984	Hell Riders		
1984	Too Scared to Scream	Produced by 21st Century.	
1984	Eye of the Evil Dead	English-dubbed release of 1982 film. Also known as Manhattan Baby.	
1984	The New York Ripper	English-dubbed release of 1982 film.	
1984	Stone	Re-release of 1974 film.	
1984	Don't Open till Christmas		
1984	New York Ninja	Produced in 1984 but not released. Acquired, finished and distributed by Vinegar Syndrome in 2021.	
1985	Sweet Sugar	Continental Video release of 1972 film as a double feature with Escape From Women's Prison. Previously released by Dimension Pictures in 1972.	
1985	The Working Girls	Continental Video release of 1974 film.	
1985	Emanuelle in Egypt (Velluto Vero)	Continental Video release of 1976 film. Previously released by Dimension Pictures as Smooth Velvet, Raw Silk in 1978, and re-released as Naked Paradise in 1979.	
1985	Jailbait Babysitter	Continental Video release of 1977 film as a double feature with The Student Body.	
1985	Avenged	Continental Video release of 1977 film. Previously released by Dimension Pictures as Tomcats in 1977.	
1985	Class Reunion Massacre	Continental Video release of 1978 film. Previously released by Dimension Pictures as The Redeemer in 1978.	
1985	Terror on Tape	Continental Video release.	
1985	Biohazard	Now owned by Retromedia.	
1985	Doomed to Die	Re-release as Continental, Inc. of 1980 film Eaten Alive!. Also released by Continental Video under the title The Emerald Jungle.	
1986	Prison Ship 2005		
1986	Devil Killer (交貨 The Delivery)	Continental Video release of 1975 film as a double feature with Dragon Lady Ninja (see Challenge the Dragon).	

=== 21st Century Film Corporation ===
The following are films produced and/or released by 21st Century after the company was rebranded and owned by Menahem Golan.
Year	Title	Notes	Ref
1989	Caged Fury		
1989	Edgar Allen Poe's The Black Cat (Il gatto nero)		
1989	Getting Even (La vendetta)		
1989	Edgar Allan Poe's The House of Usher		
1989	Mack the Knife		
1989	The Phantom of the Opera		
1989	Edgar Allan Poe's Masque of the Red Death		
1990	Warriors from Hell		
1990	Prey for the Hunter		
1990	The Forbidden Dance	released by Columbia Pictures	
1990	Bad Jim		
1990	Deceit		
1990	The Appointed (Hameyu'ad)		
1990	Edgar Allan Poe's Buried Alive		
1990	The Fifth Monkey	released by Columbia Pictures	
1990	Night of the Living Dead	released by Columbia Pictures	
1990	Bullseye!		
1990	Street Hunter		
1990	Captain America		
1991	Virgin High		
1991	Killing Streets		
1991	Bloodmatch	released by HBO Video	
1992	Prison Planet		
1992	The Finest Hour		
1992	Invader		
1992	Killer Instinct (Mad Dog Coll)		
1992	Dance Macabre		
1992	Hit the Dutchman		
1992	Hot Under the Collar		
1992	Desert Kickboxer	released by HBO Video	
1992	Three Days to a Kill		
1993	Midnight Witness	released by Academy Entertainment	
1993	Rage		
1993	Silent Victim		
1993	Ninja Vengeance		
1993	Deadly Heroes		
1993	Dead Center		
1993	Teenage Bonnie and Klepto Clyde		
1994	Death Wish V: The Face of Death		
