= Renny Roker =

American actor, promoter and youth sports advocate (1942–2022)

- Born: September 6, 1942; New York City, U.S.
- Died: December 20, 2022 (aged 80); Florida, U.S.
- Occupations: Actor, promoter, record label executive

Renny Roker (September 6, 1942 – December 20, 2022) was an American actor, sports and music promoter, and youth sports advocate credited for helping raise the profile of BMX racing in the United States.

In 1978, Roker created the JAG BMX World Championship.

Roker also founded several record labels with his brother Wally Roker in the 1970s. As a record and concert promoter, he worked with such bands and performers as Kiss (helping them achieve platinum album status for Destroyer), Donna Summer, and The Commodores. For a time, he was head of Casablanca Records's Black music division.

His acting career sparked after Nat King Cole introduced Roker to film director Otto Preminger, who cast him in a small part in 1968's Skidoo. Roker went on to a recurring role that year on the TV sitcom Gomer Pyle, a featured turn as a detective on ABC's short-lived comedy Nobody's Perfect (1980), and five episodes as attorney Byron Brown on Hill Street Blues. He also had starring roles in two films from groundbreaking Black film director Horace Jackson: 1974's Tough and Deliver Us From Evil.

== Background ==
Roker was born in New York City on September 6, 1942. He also lived in South Carolina, the Virgin Islands, and Puerto Rico before retiring in Florida.

He had acting aspirations from the age of ten. He studied drama, speech and broadcasting at the Interamerican University of Puerto Rico, earning money as an award-winning D.J. in his spare time.

His work organizing the JAG BMX racing championships ended in 1986, though he returned to promoting the sport in 2010.

Roker's daughter, Sineta Roker, auditioned for American Idol in 2007. Their distant family includes Al Roker, actress Roxie Roker, and performer Lenny Kravitz.

Roker's book Positivity: Your Key To Success, a mix of life advice and memoir, was published in 2015.

Roker died in Florida on December 20, 2022, at the age of 80.

== Film and television career ==
Roker's first professional acting role came at the age of 15 with a recurring part in Recuerdos de Maria, a Puerto Rican soap opera (he played one of Maria's neighbors).

From the late 1960s through the mid 1980s, he guest-starred in episodes of such TV hits as Julia, Mission: Impossible, The Mod Squad, and director Steven Spielberg's Amazing Stories. His final role was as Lieutenant Galey in the 1999 TV movie Kidnapped in Paradise, directed by Rob Hedden.

== Music career ==
After graduating college in Puerto Rico, Roker worked in New York as national promotion director of K.C. Records. From there, he was a freelance promoter for several acts, including The Exciters, The Cadillacs, Theola Kilgore, and Wilson Pickett. In June 1962, Liberty Records announced that he was appointed to national R&B promo-sales representative, headquartered in the label's east coast office.

Roker Records, which Renny ran with his brother Wally, released singles from 1969 to 1971, including songs by The Four Monitors, Irma Thomas, Swamp Dogg, The Whispers, and Gloria Lynne. By March 1970, their Roker Record Group was operating not just the Roker label, but also the RRG, Soulclock and Stardom labels.

In 1972, Roker and Swamp Dogg were set to appear on TV show Target, which was broadcast on WPVI-TV in Philadelphia. Their two appearances were connected to the release of the single "Sam Stone" which tells of the plight of a Vietnam Vet who returns home with a heavy drug habit. The single was released through Cream Records which Roker was connected with.

In the late 1970s he was president of R&B Productions, which was based in Los Angeles. Also in the late 1970s, he organized the First Funk Fest in Soldier Field, Chicago, an event that was attended by 70,000.

== Youth sports advocacy ==
Roker co-founded Teens on the Green, an organization that originally started out addressing the issue of minority youngsters who were dropping out of the game. Also providing them access to the more prestigious golf venues. Some of the teens who have gone through the program have gone to play in other countries, in college and according to Roker, some have played in the LPGA.

Owner/founder of Jag BMX bicycles, Roker arranged for a BMX race to be featured in an episode of the 1970s TV series CHiPs. He was inducted into the BMX Hall of Fame in 2023.

== Filmography ==
Film
Title	Role	Director	Year	Notes #
Skidoo	Prison guard	Otto Preminger	1968	
Terror in the Sky	Phone operator	Bernard L. Kowalski	1971	Made for television
Melinda	Dennis Smith	Hugh A. Robertson	1972	
The Ballad of Billie Blue	Al	Ken Osborne	1972	
The Nine Lives of Fritz the Cat		Robert Taylor	1974	Voice
Tough	Phil	Horace Jackson	1974	Also assistant to the producer
Sky Heist		Lee H. Katzin	1975	
Joey	Chris Townes	Horace Jasckson	1975	
Brothers	Lewis	Arthur Barron	1977	
And Baby Makes Six	Mailman	Waris Hussein	1979	Made for television
Honky Tonk Freeway	Sheriff	John Schlesinger	1981	
Mysterious Two	Williams	Gary Sherman	1982	Made for television
The Versace Murder	Barnie Rogers	Menahem Golan	1998	
Kidnapped in Paradise	Lieutenant Galey	Rob Hedden	1999	Made for television
Technopolis	Nathan	Andre Dixon	2015	Short
