= Horace Jackson (filmmaker) =

American movie writer and producer

Horace Jackson is an American screenwriter, filmmaker and educator.

== Early life and education ==
Born in Philadelphia, the youngest son of 21 children, Jackson described his upbringing as "a tough life". Jackson graduated high school at John B. Stetson School in Kingston, Pennsylvania. His father, a coal yard worker, along with his mother wanted their children to obtain a college education. Jackson attended Temple University theological school for one semester before moving to California becoming a Baptist preacher, a job he later left to pursue film making. Later, he attended Los Angeles City College for three years.

== Career ==
Jackson's first film, Living Between Two Worlds debuted in 1963, a film he independently financed. The film was publicized as the first full-length feature film independently financed, written and produced by African Americans with an all African American cast. While the low budget film performed well, it did not earn money personally for Jackson so he continued with his education at Los Angeles City College. Later he got a job as a recreational director for Los Angeles city school, then as a music cutter's apprentice for Paramount while he wrote the script for The Bus Is Coming.

With the help of a Paramount executive, in 1970 he formed K-Calb Productions (black spelled backwards) initially to produce The Bus Is Coming with Wendell James Franklin as director. Located in Compton, California, a Los Angeles suburb with a substantial Black middle-class population, D-Calb's aim was to produce Black-themed films from a Black perspective. Jackson noted films such as Hearts in Dixie and The Liberation of L.B. Jones "have presented a distorted view of blacks because most of them have been how whites perceive us". Further plans for the production company included constructing Compton's first theater and training programs for Compton's youth in the film making industry.

With a small budget of $175,000, financial issues persisted during the making of The Bus Is Coming. Jackson and his family were evicted from their home and production of the film ceased for a period to raise more funds. After reading about Jackson's issues, a former casket dealer provided the additional funding. In July 1971 the film premiered at the Compton High School Auditorium to benefit the Compton Cinema Center Fund. While the film grossed $4 million, Jackson reportedly received only a small profit.

In 1974, Jackson released Tough, a G-rated family film.

In 1975, was honored with a key to the City of Detroit for his film Deliver Us From Evil with Detroit City Council member Emma Henderson stating "Mr. Jackson has produced a film the entire family can enjoy" and recognized him one of the pioneers of Black films in the sixties and seventies.

== Filmography ==
- Living Between Two Worlds (1963)
- The Bus is Coming (1972)
- Tough, also known as Johnny Tough (1974)
- Deliver Us From Evil (1976)

== See also ==
- African American cinema
