= List of Vegas (1978 TV series) episodes =

This is a list of episodes for the American private detective crime drama television series Vegas, which aired on ABC from April 25, 1978, to June 3, 1981.

== Series overview ==
Season	Episodes	Originally aired	
Season	Episodes	First aired	Last aired
1	22	September 20, 1978	May 9, 1979
2	23	September 19, 1979	May 7, 1980
3	23	November 5, 1980	June 3, 1981

== Episodes ==
=== TV Movie ===
Title	Directed by	Written by	Original release date
"High Roller"	Richard Lang	Michael Mann	April 25, 1978
In the series’ pilot episode, Las Vegas private eye Dan Tanna (Robert Urich) is hired by a couple from the Midwest to locate their runaway daughter, who has turned to prostitution to make ends meet. When the girl winds up murdered, Tanna must follow clues into her seedy underworld. Meanwhile, at the Desert Inn, resort owner Philip “Slick” Roth (Tony Curtis) hopes Tanna can nail a cunning trickster who has been making a killing at the casino’s slot machines. Will Sampson, Red Buttons, June Allyson, Scatman Crothers, Edd Byrnes and Michael Lerner guest star. Note: Costigan (Chick Vennera), Harlon Twoleaf (Will Sampson) and Tanna fought in the Vietnam war together. They are Tanna's main sidekicks in the pilot. Bart Braverman has a small unnamed comic relief role as someone hired to tail Tanna. In the series, Braverman played Urich's sidekick while Sampson and Vennera turned up occasionally (six episodes total for Sampson and three for Vennera). In the pilot, Lt Nelson's (Greg Morris) first name is George but it is change first to Burt (played by Raymond St. Jacques) and then to Dave (with the return of Morris) in the series.

=== Season 1 (1978–79) ===
No. overall	No. in season	Title	Directed by	Written by	Original release date
1	1	"Centerfold"	Harry Falk	Burton Armus	September 20, 1978
When world-famous supermodel Shawn Adams (guest star Cristina Ferrare) decides not to renew her contract with her debt-ridden manager, the desperate showbiz agent concocts a scheme that will keep his high-paying client on board. Tanna and his associates investigate the model’s shocking claim. Will Sampson, Vic Tayback, Morey Amsterdam, Abe Vigoda, and Dane Clark also guest star.
2	2	"The Games Girls Play"	Sutton Roley	Fred Freiberger	September 27, 1978
Tanna is hired by Senator William Mitchell (guest star Don Porter) – a lawmaker who has championed an anti-pornography bill – after the senator claims some racy blackmail photos could derail both his legislation and his political career. During his probe, Tanna discovers that another private eye is also trailing the suspected perpetrators – but with an entirely different motive. Tony Curtis, Shelley Fabares, Linda Thompson, John Carradine, Troy Donahue, and Alex Trebek guest star.
3	3	"Mother Mishkin"	Bernard McEveety	Ron Friedman	October 11, 1978
Mother Mishkin (guest star Molly Picon), a former Las Vegas madam, hires Dan Tanna after she starts receiving death threats. All of the evidence points to a real estate speculator who would love nothing better than to take possession of Mishkin’s valuable property. Or does it? Tony Curtis, Sid Caesar, Anne Francis, Ross Martin, and Antonio Fargas guest star.
4	4	"Love, Laugh or Die"	Don Chaffey	Richard Carr	October 18, 1978
Who murdered former call girl Lexy Gardner? When the local police don't show much interest in the case, the victim’s mother hires Tanna to investigate three of Lexy’s former lovers who might be possible suspects – a singer (Bobby Van), a tennis pro (Robert Mandan), and a construction magnate (Andrew Duggan). Tony Curtis, Don Galloway, Dorothy Malone, Jonathan Harris, and Bill Dana guest star.
5	5	"Yes, My Darling Daughter"	Don Chaffey	Milt Rosen	October 25, 1978
At her wedding, a young bride (Lauren Tewes) insists that she caught a glimpse of her father among the gathered guests – a popular country singer who vanished a decade ago, and is now presumed dead. Tanna’s sleuthing uncovers many of the singer’s old showbiz contacts, some of whom might be able to help unravel the mystery. Tony Curtis, Barbara McNair, Slim Pickens, Strother Martin, and Randy Powell guest star.
6	6	"Lady Ice"	Marc Daniels	Story by : Jeffrey M. Hayes & John Whelpley; Teleplay by : Burton Armus	November 1, 1978
A glittering jewelry convention at the Desert Inn attracts many buyers and sellers to the dazzling array of pricey gems... as well as some cunning thieves who plan to rob a wealthy Sheikh of his collection of valuable rubies. When Tanna gets drawn into the case, he encounters a seductive woman (Kim Basinger) who may be involved in the caper. Tony Curtis, Nehemiah Persoff, Richard Bakalyan, and Cameron Mitchell guest star.
7	7	"Milliken's Stash"	Lawrence Doheny	Larry Alexander	November 8, 1978
A former drug dealer, now living in retirement in Las Vegas, is forced by the mob to sell one last shipment of cocaine. But when the deal goes awry as the police attempt a bust, Tanna finds himself involved in the caper when the missing stash ends up being held for ransom! Tony Curtis, John Marley, Henry Jones, Isabel Sanford, Shelley Berman, and Pernell Roberts guest star.
8	8	"The Pageant"	Lawrence Dobkin	E. Nick Alexander	November 15, 1978
A serial rapist appears to be targeting contestants of the “Miss Casino” beauty pageant. A description of the suspect is of some help, but with the attacker still loose, Tanna reluctantly allows his assistant Bea (Phyllis Davis) to act as bait to try to nab the assailant. Tony Curtis, Michael Callan, Peter Brown, Maureen McCormick, and Robert Reed guest star. Note: Robert Reed and Maureen McCormick's best known roles were as Mike Brady and stepdaughter Marcia on The Brady Bunch.
9	9	"Lost Women"	Paul Stanley	Burton Armus	November 22, 1978
“Slick” Roth has Tanna shadow an unwelcome guest at the Desert Inn – infamous white-collar criminal Christopher Vincente (guest star Cesar Romero). But when Tanna tails the suave criminal to his estate on Lake Mead, he discovers that Vincente appears to be the head of a notorious female slavery network that is based overseas in Europe. Tony Curtis and Moses Gunn guest star. Note: First appearance of Greg Morris as Lt. David Nelson after the pilot.
10	10	"Second Stanza"	Bob Kelljan	Jeff Myrow	December 6, 1978
Booze and pills have taken their toll on entertainer Ginny Gordon. But when several “accidents” appear to be disguised as suicide attempts, Tanna becomes convinced that Ginny’s manager and several of her opportunistic bandmates value her more dead than alive. Ronee Blakeley, Joseph Campanella, Harvey Lembeck, and Doc Severinsen guest star.
11	11	"Serve, Volley and Kill"	Sutton Roley	Norman Lessing	December 20, 1978
Temperamental tennis pro Bobby Howard (Randolph Mantooth) has been receiving threatening phone calls. His coach Sid Green hires Dan to protect Bobby, who doesn't want it. Meanwhile, Binzer tries to stop Tommy Cirko's petty larceny: impersonating a minister. Pamelyn Ferdin, Red Buttons, Dawn Wells, Lynda Day George and Christopher George guest star.
12	12	"Ghost of the Ripper"	Lawrence Dobkin	Larry Forrester	January 10, 1979
Psychotic Jack Schulman is killing prostitutes. Amateur criminologist Philiip Graykirk sees a pattern similar to the Jack-the-Ripper murders and predicts more deaths to come. George Takei and Pamela Hensley guest star.
13	13	"The Eleventh Event"	Don Chaffey	Brian McKay	January 17, 1979
A benefit telethon is planned for Leon Hazlett, a five-time Olympic gold medalist who was crippled in a car crash. But emcee Paul Baker is kidnapped and a $200,000 ransom is demanded. Muhammad Ali, Vernee Watson, Robert Loggia, Michael Conrad guest star.
14	14	"Kill Dan Tanna!"	Curtis Harrington	Larry Forrester	January 24, 1979
When Dan was in Vietnam, he once defied the orders of Captain North, who wound up crippled. North hires goons to help him take revenge by terrorizing Dan and the people around him. Will Sampson, Kyle Richards, Richard Lynch, and Don Gordon guest star.
15	15	"Death Mountain"	George McCowan	Larry Forrester	January 31, 1979
Chief Gray Bear is trying to stall a Japanese businessman's construction project on the reservation. Will Sampson, Joan Van Ark, Ken Curtis, and Keye Luke guest star.
16	16	"Best Friends"	Don Chaffey	Robert Earll	February 7, 1979
Dan's childhood friend visits Vegas. Unknown to Dan, he is the felon who kills Erwin Levy and wounds Roth in the process. Will Philip Roth be the next victim? John Rubinstein and Tony Curtis guest star.
17	17	"Demand and Supply"	Cliff Bole	Gerry Davis	February 14, 1979
A teenager gets assaulted at the seedy Pinecrest Hotel. Her mother's friend, begs Dan to take the case. Meanwhile, the pimp threatens to harm another teenage girl if she doesn't turn tricks. John Fiedler and R.G. Armstrong guest star.
18	18	"Everything I Touch"	Paul Stanley	E. Nick Alexander	February 28, 1979
Dan's love interest Christy Winters is strangled in her hotel room. Her friend tries to help him solve the case and becomes the next victim. Both girls were with Dan right before their murders, leaving Dan badly grief-stricken. Angie is in mortal danger when a mysterious, bearded figure begins killing all the women in Dan's life; Heather Menzies (Robert Urich's wife) and Tony Curtis guest star. Note: Last appearance by Judy Landers in series.
19	19	"Doubtful Target"	Lawrence Doheny	E. Nick Alexander	March 7, 1979
Savings and loan president Tyler Dickinson (Leslie Nielsen) murders investment counselor Cy Winters and then Binzer's girlfriend Kim Sarrason. Binzer is first devastated and then vindictive. Can Dan prevent Binzer from exacting vigilante justice?
20	20	"Touch of Death"	Don Chaffey	James Schmerer	March 14, 1979
Newlywed Gary Cole goes to buy some jewelry for his wife Wendy, and disappears. When Wendy realizes he's missing, nobody that she questions seems to recognize the couple. Her hysteria only hampers Dan's investigation.
21	21	"The Way to Live"	Don Chaffey	Burton Armus	May 2, 1979
Daredevil Shara Stanley's drunken mechanic Bill Woods tries to talk her out of a dangerous stunt because her beneficiaries plan to sabotage it and have her killed so they can collect on her insurance. Wilfrid Hyde-White and Tom Urich (Robert Urich's brother) guest star.
22	22	"The Visitor"	Lawrence Doheny	Burton Armus	May 9, 1979
Dan is hired to be the escort and bodyguard of Princess Zara (Kim Cattrall) during her stay in Las Vegas. But political problems follow her. Fanatic Lucille tries to kill both Dan and Zara before she herself is shot dead in Zara's hotel room. Michael Ansara and Will Sampson guest star.

=== Season 2 (1979–80) ===
No. overall	No. in season	Title	Directed by	Written by	Original release date
23	1	"Redhanded"	Don Chaffey	Gerry Davis	September 19, 1979
A girl (Melanie Griffith) Two Leaf knows comes to town to take care of some business. Later she's killed with Two Leaf's knife and he has scratches on his face that matches her hands. Dan thinks he's being set up but Nelson has no choice but to take him in. Later a television reporter is trying to paint Two Leaf as a danger to society. Upon hearing this he breaks out of jail. Will Sampson, Lola Falana, Jo Ann Pflug, Denny Miller, and Andrew Duggan guest star.
24	2	"The Usurper"	Don Chaffey	Valerie Allen	September 26, 1979
Dan comes looking for Roth, and finds a man named Rodmore (Robert Reed) in charge. So Dan tries to find Roth to find out what's going on but he appears to have vanished, and Dan tries to find out why Roth turned control of the company to Rodmore. At the same time someone is following Dan. Tony Curtis, Dean Martin, Scatman Crothers, Minnesota Fats, and Jimmy Mataya (a pool champion) guest star
25	3	"Mixed Blessing"	Cliff Bole	David P. Harmon	October 3, 1979
Sister Bridget Callahan (Cassie Yates) hires Dan to find drug addict Jimmy Porter and recover the Cross of Casseras, which Jimmy stole from her New Mexico mission to sell to someone else. But she won't reveal Jimmy's name, thereby complicating Dan's task. David Huddleston and James Luisi guest star.
26	4	"Runaway"	Cliff Bole	Leo Garen	October 24, 1979
Dan is hired by a man to look for his daughter who is pregnant. While Dan tries to find her someone is following him. When he eventually finds her, she calls her father to come but when he arrive she claims he is not her father. That's when he pulls a gun. Pat Hingle and John Quade guest star.
27	5	"Design for Death"	Phil Bondelli	Ken Pettus	October 31, 1979
Dan's hired by a designer (Eve Arden) who's at the hotel to unveil her new line. It seems some of her models are being terrorized and one of them is Dan's ex (Barbi Benton). While investigating, the men who are terrorizing them are putting their plan in motion. One of the men who fears that Dan's ex who saw him commit one of their acts against them might identify him, kills her which makes things more personal for Dan. Gary Crosby, Cliff Osmond and Linda Thompson guest star.
28	6	"Shadow on a Star"	Don Chaffey	Pat Dunlop & Carol Saraceno	November 14, 1979
When a singer (Lisa Hartman) who's supposed to perform at the hotel is sexually assaulted, she asks for private investigator. So the manager calls Dan. She wants Dan to keep it quiet out of fear that it could ruin her career and life. So Dan asks Nelson to make it quiet. He then goes to a rape counselor who tells Dan that her attacker will do it again. What Dan doesn't know is that her attacker could be closer to her than he thinks.
29	7	"Dan Tanna Is Dead"	Alf Kjellin	Dallas L. Barnes	November 21, 1979
Victor Durand (John Colicos) once ran a bogus clinic before Dan sent him to prison. Now Durand takes revenge by stealing a toxin, infecting Dan with it, and taunting him, while Dan and his doctors frantically search for a cure to keep Dan alive.
30	8	"The Macho Murders"	Lawrence Doheny	Story by : Elaine Newman; Teleplay by : David P. Harmon	November 28, 1979
When pimp Luke Manning is gunned down in his home, women's rights activist Virginia Marshall is accused, hires Dan, and tells him she couldn't have killed Luke because her gun was stolen two weeks earlier. Shelley Winters guest stars.
31	9	"The Day the Gambling Stopped"	Cliff Bole	Robert E. Swanson	December 12, 1979
When the casino takes in more chips than they dispensed, there's concern that someone has stolen the hotel's chips. So Dan talks to Clay Summer (Barry Sullivan), who makes the chips and swears there's no way to take a chip out of the plant. When Clay's innocence is questioned, Dan sets out to prove his innocence. Clay's son Brad (Christopher Stone), who faked his death, is behind it and is working with plant employee Eddie Stolvak (John Karlen). When Eddie gets nervous, Brad kills Eddie and frames Dan.
32	10	"Classic Connection"	Don Chaffey	Dallas L. Barnes	December 19, 1979
Justin Marsh, who was once a great race car driver, and Dan's friend is in town for a classic car auction. Wells Tate, a mechanic, who works on Dan's T-Bird was found dead and it seems that he was planning to call Dan but was killed before he could. Dan then notices that a woman is following Justin and when he confronts her, she tells him that Justin Marsh is working for a man named Rollins who smuggles drugs into the country in classic automobiles. And buy the cars at auctions. And it seems that Wells Tate was their buyer and when he refused to continue doing it, they killed him. Dan after doing a little investigating, agrees to help her, after nailing Rollins, Dan goes after Justin, Justin tries to get away but Dan chases him and Justin drives his car off a cliff. Wayne Newton and Eric Braeden guest star.
33	11	"Night of a Thousand Eyes"	Don Chaffey	Jack Turley	January 2, 1980
When a friend of Dan's who's also a P.I. is killed, his girlfriend asks him to look into it. At the same time, there's a P.I. convention going on at the hotel and some other P.I.s are getting killed. A female P.I. knows something but she's not willing to share it. When an attempt is made on her, she reveals that she and other P.I.'s were hired to solve a case that's been unsolved for years. Gary Collins and Heather Menzies (Robert Urich's wife) guest star.
34	12	"Lost Monday"	Phil Bondelli	Martin Roth	January 9, 1980
Binzer goes to see Paula Conway (Mary Ann Mobley) a hypnotist for a little self improvement. But what he doesn't know is she has been hired by some malefactors to turn him into their private assassin. When Tanna notices Binzer has been missing for several days he looks for him. While looking for Binzer, Tanna runs into Jamie Randall, an old friend, who is a reporter doing research on point shaving at college basketball games. It seems the men who hired Paula are the ones behind the point shaving and Binzer being hypnotized to kill Jamie and a player whom they approached who turned them down, plus collateral damage and anyone who gets in Binzer's way. (The trigger word that will turn Binzer lethal is "superstar".) Dick Sargent, Garry Marshall and Phil Morris (Greg Morris's son) guest star.
35	13	"Comeback"	Lewis Teague	Story by : Chick Vennera; Teleplay by : Robert E. Swanson	January 16, 1980
Mitch Costigan (Chick Vennera), Dan's Army buddy who's been away for sometime returns to town to perform at the hotel. He's also a newlywed. When he and Dan go to the hotel, his wife stays behind to fix things at the house. Later someone plants an explosive and blows the house up. Mitch is devastated. Later Dan learns that the explosive used is similar to what was used in Vietnam. So Dan thinks there may be a link to their time in Vietnam to what happened to Mitch's wife. Mitch is on a mission to find the one who killed his wife. Will Sampson, Joe E. Tata (Beverly Hills 90210) and Royce D. Applegate guest star. Note: Last appearance by Will Sampson in series. Chick Vennera appeared in the pilot episode.
36	14	"All Kinds of Love"	Lawrence Dobkin	Larry Forrester	January 23, 1980
Bea meets a guy while on vacation and gets engaged. She brings him to Vegas to meet everyone. When Tanna sees him he recognizes him as Miles Glover (Dennis Cole) (now calling himself "Drew Marley"), the man who stole away a girl Tanna was dating years earlier. Later, she died mysteriously and he walked away with her money. Unfortunately, Dan's word is not enough so he tries to get information and find the sister of the dead girl who knew the man back then. Meanwhile, Glover/Marley tries to ensure that Tanna does not spoil his plans.
37	15	"The Magic Sister Slayings"	Don Chaffey	Story by : Chick Vennera; Teleplay by : Pat Dunlop	January 30, 1980
Dan is targeted by a man who's trying to get a gaming license because Dan has a videotape that shows him consorting with criminals. He sends a professional hit man to get Dan but he misses. He abducts Mitch Costigan (Chick Vennera), Dan's friend and holds him to get Dan to turn the tape over to him.
38	16	"The Lido Girls"	Don Chaffey	James Schmerer	February 6, 1980
A trio of beauties become suspiciously good at the baccarat table. Another player at the table, Everett Mason, wants in on their secret. As it turns out, so does aging French detective Nicholas Rambeau (Louis Jourdan). L.Q. Jones guest stars.
39	17	"Consortium"	Lawrence Dobkin	Robert Earll	February 27, 1980
Roth is planning to put a hotel casino in Toronto and to help him with financing, he organizes a consortium of businessmen. But they're having a hard time on deciding who should be in charge. Roth wants Paul Bracken (James Darren), one of his people and Dan's brother-in-law to be the one. But one of the members of the consortium, Mel Brandon (Lloyd Bochner), wants to be the one in charge. So sets out to make Paul undesirable by going after Dan and everyone around him, Bea and Binzer.
40	18	"The Hunter Hunted"	Cliff Bole	E. Nick Alexander	March 5, 1980
When someone with a grudge against Nelson goes after his family, he tries to handle it on his own. But Dan insists on helping. Robert Loggia, Vernee Watson, Rodney Allen Rippy, and Captain & Tennille (Daryl Dragon, Toni Tennille) guest star.
41	19	"The Man Who Was Twice"	Alf Kjellin	Judy Burns	March 12, 1980
A headlining, talented, versatile illusionist and female impersonator (Jim Bailey) is receiving bizarre death threats. His manager (Darleen Carr)says he's just over reacting. When he reaches out to Dan Tanna for help, Dan begins, also, to get death threats. Wolfman Jack and Patti Davis (Ronald and Nancy Reagan's daughter) guest star.
42	20	"The Golden Gate Cop Killer Part 1 and 2"	Cliff Bole	Robert Earll & Judy Burns	March 19, 1980
43	21	"The Golden Gate Cop Killer Part 1 and 2"	Cliff Bole	Robert Earll & Judy Burns	March 19, 1980
A cop from San Francisco who's a friend of Dan's comes to Vegas. It seems that someone is targeting cops, sending them messages telling them when they will be killed usually with a number in it. The man follows the cop and kills him in front of Dan. Dan notices two women when his friend was killed. Dan decides to go to San Francisco and is shunned by the police department but decides to investigate nonetheless and sees the women and later learns that they're cops who were sent by his friend's boss to keep an eye on him. Their boss wants Dan to leave but upon learning that he made some discoveries decides to let Dan stay. Michelle Phillips, Tanya Roberts, Natalie Schafer (Gilligan's Island), Peggy Cass, and Peter Mark Richman guest star.
44	22	"Siege of the Desert Inn"	Lawrence Dobkin	Larry Forrester	April 30, 1980
Some men try to rob the hotel but something goes wrong and they take some the showgirls hostage and Bea who was there watching them was also taken. They hold up in a room where the cops can't get to them. The leader then demands 5 million dollars or else he'll kill one of the girls every hour. And to prove he's serious, he kills one and sends her down the elevator. Dan tries to find a way to save the girls and Bea. Cameron Mitchell and Richard Bakalyan guest star.
45	23	"Vendetta"	Michael S. McLean	Albert Aley	May 7, 1980
An old friend of Dan's who owns an Italian restaurant, is poisoned during a wedding celebration when a bad guy adds drugs to his silver wine goblet. Until Dan investigates, an old vendetta is blamed and the goblet is considered cursed. Joseph Campanella guest stars.

=== Season 3 (1980–81) ===
No. overall	No. in season	Title	Directed by	Written by	Original release date
46	1	"Aloha, You're Dead: Parts 1 & 2"	Don Chaffey	Herman Groves	November 5, 1980
47	2	"Aloha, You're Dead: Parts 1 & 2"	Don Chaffey	Herman Groves	November 5, 1980
Dan Tanna is kidnapped and taken to Hawaii where his captors attempt to coerce him into murdering Philip Roth, who they see as a threat when they learn that he plans to expand his casino empire. After tricking his kidnappers into thinking their efforts were successful, Dan teams up with federal agents in bringing the leader of the conspiracy to justice. Lorne Greene, Pernell Roberts and John Saxon guest star. Note: Lorne Greene and Pernell Roberts previously were on the NBC Western series Bonanza; Greene appeared for the entire run while Roberts left in 1965.
48	3	"The Black Cat Killer"	Ray Austin	Herman Groves	November 12, 1980
After one of his own is shot in their apartment, Dan searches for the deadly cat burglar who has already slain three other people. During his search for the killer, he meets a reporter who wants to do a story on him. Though reluctant to let her join him, Dan manages to uncover a quality that each of the victims share. Erin Gray (Buck Rogers, Silver Spoons), Harold J. Stone and Joe E. Tata (Beverly Hills 90210) guest star.
49	4	"Sudden Death"	Gabrielle Beaumont	Bill Stratton	November 19, 1980
After killing a burglar in his date's apartment in self-defense, Dan's guilt compels him to look into the young victim's background; especially, when he learns the man he killed carried only an air rifle. Stepfanie Kramer (Hunter), Jill St. John and Vito Scotti guest star.
50	5	"Love Affair"	Cliff Bole	Robert Earll	November 26, 1980
Dan unknowingly falls in love with a prostitute who's working for a pimp who's involved in murder. Priscilla Barnes, Dick Sargent, Ruta Lee and Patti Davis (Ronald and Nancy Reagan's daughter) guest star.
51	6	"A Deadly Victim"	Ray Austin	James Schmerer	December 3, 1980
An alcoholic former attorney (guest star Eleanor Parker) hires Dan when an assassin (guest star Vincent Baggetta) kills a vagrant who foiled a murder attempt. Upon showing up at the crime scene, Dan is unable to unearth evidence that a killing actually took place. All of which is complicated when Dan realizes that the sole witness is an old friend. Bubba Smith, and Victor Buono guest star.
52	7	"Deadly Blessing"	Michael S. McLean	Robert Earll	December 10, 1980
A nun (guest star Cassie Yates) from New Mexico comes into town looking for land that was left to her in a will by an old man and asks Dan to help her find it. It's only then that he discovers that the property left to her is that on which the Desert Inn stands -- and she is determined to turn it into a convent. Tony Curtis guest stars.
53	8	"Christmas Story"	Charlie Picerni	Story by : Anne Collins & Robert Urich; Teleplay by : Anne Collins	December 17, 1980
Dan's vacation at a ski resort is interrupted when a 9-year-old girl (guest star Jill Whelan) claiming to be Dan's daughter brings a note saying her mother is ready to commit suicide.
54	9	"The Andreas Addiction"	Alf Kjellin	Herman Groves	January 7, 1981
An ex-addict (guest star Joe Penny) takes vengeance on Dan by poisoning his food. With Dan weakened by the effects of the drugs, the man is able to capture him, chain him in an abandoned casino and continue injecting him with heroin. June Lockhart guest stars. Don Stroud and Vito Scotti guest star.
55	10	"Sourdough Suite"	Charlie Picerni	Judy Burns	January 14, 1981
An old prospector (guest star Noah Beery Jr.) finds a satchel of money in the desert. Upon going into town to spend it, he piques the suspicions of Dan with a less than believable alibi. As the men who originally lost their satchel close in, Dan gets caught up in the crossfire.
56	11	"Murder by Mirrors"	Ray Austin	Story by : Herman Groves & Stephen Kandel; Teleplay by : Herman Groves	January 21, 1981
Beatrice (Phyllis Davis) witnesses a murder while flying over a luxurious house. When the police arrive at the scene, the body and any evidence that indicate a crime took place are missing. Patrick Macnee and Julie Adams guest star.
57	12	"Backlash"	Cliff Bole	Herman Groves	February 18, 1981
A mother hires Dan to find out why her grown daughter goes out at night dressed like a teenager - unaware that the girl and her friends are being coerced to participate in extortion. Morgan Woodward guest stars.
58	13	"Heist"	Don Chaffey	Herman Groves	February 25, 1981
Dan Tanna stages a robbery to test Roth's casino security systems, only to have one of his accomplices (James MacArthur) decide to keep the cash. Tony Curtis, Werner Klemperer, Joe E. Tata (Beverly Hills 90210) guest stars.
59	14	"No Way to Treat a Victim"	Ray Austin	Anne Collins	March 4, 1981
When a man's dates all seem to end with the rape and sometimes murder of his companions, Bea calls in Dan to investigate. Michael Cole guest stars.
60	15	"Time Bomb"	Cliff Bole	Robert Earll	March 11, 1981
Two men from Binzer's past return and demand that he pay them $50,000 for a crime the three did together, or they'll turn him in for being an accomplice in the robbery -- sending Binzer on a panicked search for someone to lend him the money. Denny Miller, Dick Butkus, Michael Constantine and Linda Thompson guest star. Note: Final appearance in the series of Tony Curtis as Philip "Slick" Roth.
61	16	"Out of Sight"	Cliff Bole	Anne Collins	March 18, 1981
Dan's investigation of an oilman who suspects his competition of having ties to the mob abruptly ends when he is temporarily blinded after being shot in the head by thugs. Harry Guardino and Ed Nelson guest star.
62	17	"Set Up"	Cliff Bole	E. Duke Vincent & Robert Earll	March 25, 1981
A double date for Dan and Nelson ends with the lieutenant framed for two murders. Simon Oakland, Sybil Danning and Richard Basehart guest star.
63	18	"The Killing"	Don Chaffey	Richard Kenneth Wells	April 15, 1981
Dan suspects that a robbery and shooting that left four restaurant patrons dead is a cover-up for the assassination of one of the victims. Pamela Franklin and Victor Buono guest star.
64	19	"Seek and Destroy"	Michael S. McLean	Bill Stratton	April 22, 1981
A Russian pilot test-flying a new fighter plane decides to defect and turn the plane over to the American government at a base near Las Vegas. When it's learned that Soviet agents are attempting to destroy it before it can be studied, Dan is called in to help. Heather Menzies (Robert Urich's wife), Victor Buono, and Tori Spelling guest star.
65	20	"Dead Ringer"	Cliff Bole	Herman Groves	April 29, 1981
Wayne Newton (appearing as himself) receives a death threat in his own handwriting telling him to leave the country. It's from someone who believes he's Wayne Newton and that the original is an impostor. Broderick Crawford, Richard Lynch, and Ned Glass guest star.
66	21	"French Twist"	Charlie Picerni	Anne Collins	May 6, 1981
A French detective (Louis Jourdan) and an old friend of Dan's contacts him when the trail of an unfaithful wife leads him to Las Vegas. Randolph Mantooth, Edd Byrnes and Lloyd Bochner guest star.
67	22	"Judgement Pronounced"	Dennis Donnelly	Story by : David P. Harmon; Teleplay by : Bill Stratton	May 27, 1981
A deranged man hires a double for Dan Tanna to execute his brand of justice by killing men he holds grudges against. Alan Feinstein and Tom Urich (Robert Urich's brother) guest star. Note: This episode got a re-airing on June 10, 1981. Michael D. Roberts makes a cameo appearance. Roberts would star with Urich in The Ice Pirates in 1984.
68	23	"Nightmare Come True"	Dennis Donnelly	Anne Collins	June 3, 1981
Dan is hired by a wealthy man to locate his daughter, who's been kidnapped. When he arrives at the man's home, he's informed that his client has hired a psychic man who Dan is reluctant to work with. When Dan meets her, she warns him that his life could be in danger. Cristina Ferrare (who appeared in the first episode of Season 1 as a different character) and Tim O'Connor guest star.
