= George Buck Flower =

American actor (1937–2004)

- Flower in They Live
- Born: George Albert Flower; October 28, 1937; Milton-Freewater, Oregon, U.S.
- Died: June 18, 2004 (aged 66); Los Angeles, California, U.S.
- Education: Eastern Oregon University
- Occupations: Actor; writer; producer; director; manager
- Years active: 1970–2004

George Albert "Buck" Flower (October 28, 1937 – June 18, 2004) was an American actor, writer, producer, assistant director, production manager and casting director. He was sometimes credited as Ernest Wall, Buck Flower, George "Buck" Flower, George Flower, Buck Flowers, C. D. LaFleur, C.D. LaFleure, C.D. Lafleuer, and C.D. Lafleur.

Because of Flower's gruff appearance, he was often cast as a drunk or homeless character. Director John Carpenter gave Flower a cameo role in several films he made throughout the 1980s.

== Career ==
Flower began his career in the 1970s with roles in numerous erotic, exploitation and horror films, including Satan's Lust (1971), The Daring Dobermans (1973), Criminally Insane (1975) and Drive-In Massacre (1976).

Director John Carpenter cast Flower in a supporting role in the supernatural horror film The Fog (1980), and continued to hire Flower in small roles in several of his subsequent films, including Escape from New York (1981), Starman (1984), They Live (1988), Body Bags (1993) and Village of the Damned (1995). Other notable roles included Red the Bum in Back to the Future (1985) and its sequel Back to the Future Part II (1989).

== Death ==
Flower died of cancer in Los Angeles, California, at age 66 on June 18, 2004.

== Filmography ==
=== Film ===
Year	Title	Role	Notes
1970	Norma	Mother	
1970	Cousin Jed Rises Again	Bar Patron	Uncredited
1970	Country Cuzzins	Walter Wimpy	
1971	Touch Me	Harry Belmont	
1971	Satan's Lust	Manheim Jarkoff	
1971	Mother Knows Best	Boris Clitoris	
1971	Below the Belt	Benny	
1971	The Erotic Adventures of Pinocchio	Grip	
1972	Sex in the Comics	Flasher	Uncredited
1973	The Daring Dobermans	Luther	
1973	The Dirty Mind of Young Sally	Toby	
1973	Tender Loving Care	William Simpson	Credited as C.D. Lafleur
1973	The Dirty Dolls	Unnamed	
1973	The Sex Prophet	Igor	
1973	The Devil and Leroy Bassett	Wilbur Bassett	
1973	Suckula	George Smutman / Sandra Vancour	Uncredited
1973	Orgy American Style	Unnamed	
1973	Teenage Innocence	N/A	First assistant director; set decorator Also known as: Little Miss Innocence
1973	Guess Who's Coming This Weekend	Florian	Uncredited
1974	Tower of Love	Petulia	Uncredited
1974	Video Vixens	Rex Boorski	
1974	Like Father, Like Son	Vince Baccari	
1974	Alice Goodbody	Roger Merkel	
1975	Teenage Seductress	N/A	Screenplay co-writer; associate producer Also known as: Love is Forever, For the Love of Terry, Father's Night
1975	Delinquent School Girls	Earl	
1975	The Candy Tangerine Man	Gordon	
1975	Flash and Firecat	Jed	
1975	Ilsa, She Wolf of the SS	Binz	Credited as C.D. Lafleur
1975	Johnny the Firecloud	Wade	Casting director
1975	Gemini Affair	2nd Cab Driver	
1975	The Adventures of the Wilderness Family	Boomer	
1975	That Girl from Boston	Thirsty	
1975	Lady Cocoa	Drunk Gambler	
1975	Criminally Insane	Detective Sergeant Earl McDonough	
1976	The Witch that Came from the Sea	Detective Stone	Casting director
1976	Ilsa, Harem Keeper of the Oil Sheiks	Beggar	
1976	Devil's Ecstasy	John	Also: voice (uncredited)
1976	Love Games	Paddy O'Brien	Uncredited
1976	Deep Jaws	Porno Crew Member #3	
1976	All Night Long	Painin Theass	Credited as Lloyd Matthews
1976	A Small Town in Texas	Bull Parker	
1976	Country Doc	Clem Park	Uncredited
1976	Drive In Massacre	Suspect In Warehouse	Uncredited; Also: screenplay co-writer; associate producer
1976	Across the Great Divide	Ben	
1977	Bad Georgia Road	Spiker	Also: assistant director
1977	Joyride to Nowhere	N/A	Screenplay co-writer Also known as: Baby Dolls
1977	Bare Knuckles	Lem	Also: assistant director
1978	The Alpha Incident	Hank	
1978	The Further Adventures of the Wilderness Family	Boomer	
1978	Killers Delight	Pete	
1978	Teen Lust	Mr. Sykes	
1978	The Kid from Not-So-Big	McGee / Boyle / Gus	
1979	Adventures of the Wilderness Family 3	Boomer	Also known as: Mountain Family Robinson
1979	The Capture of Bigfoot	Jake	
1979	Up Yours	Beggar	Also: associate producer
1980	Terror on Tour	N/A	Production manager
1980	The Fog	Tommy Wallace	
1980	Beyond Evil	N/A	Production advisor
1981	Escape from New York	Drunk	
1981	Early Warning	Tucker	
1981	Strange But True	N/A	Production supervisor
1982	Butterfly	Ed Lamey	
1982	Fake-Out	Merrich	
1983	The Lonely Lady	N/A	Assistant director: second unit Also known as: Harold Robbins' The Lonely Lady
1983	Tiger Man	N/A	Casting director
1983	Flicks	Eagle Man	Segment: "New Adventures of the Great Galaxy"
1984	Breakin'		Voice
1984	In Search of a Golden Sky	Zep Morrison	Screenplay co-writer; associate producer
1984	Starman	Cook	
1984	My Therapist	Rip Rider	
1985	The Click	Guy Giving Directions	Uncredited (U.S. version)
1985	Rigged	Unnamed	
1985	Back to the Future	Red	
1986	The Night Stalker	Tramp	Co-producer
1987	Berserker	Pappy Nyquist	
1987	Code Name Zebra	Bundy	
1987	Death Blow: A Cry for Justice	Willard	Also known as: W.A.R.: Women Against Rape
1987	Takin' It All Off	Allison's Father	Uncredited; Also: screenplay co-writer (with Ed Hansen); line producer
1987	Party Favors	Pop	Also: screenplay co-writer (with Ed Hansen); line producer
1988	Grotesque	N/A	Pre-production coordinator
1988	Sorority Babes in the Slimeball Bowl-O-Rama	Janitor	
1988	Maniac Cop	Old Man	
1988	Cheerleader Camp	Pop	
1988	Pumpkinhead	Mr. Wallace	
1988	Mac and Me	Security Guard	
1988	They Live	Drifter	
1988	The American Scream	Ed Simpson	
1989	Sundown: The Vampire in Retreat	Bailey	
1989	Relentless	Old Man	
1989	W.B., Blue and the Bean	Seed	Also known as: Bail Out
1989	One Man Force	Drunk	
1989	Back to the Future Part II	Red	
1989	Ghost Writer	Workman	
1989	Speak of the Devil	Redneck	Uncredited
1990	Nerds of a Feather	Bed Patient	
1990	Spontaneous Combustion	Radio Preacher	
1990	Down the Drain	Crane Operator	
1990	Masters of Menace	Sheriff Julip	
1990	Dead Men Don't Die	Wino	
1990	Blood Games	Vern	
1990	Dragonfight	Jericho	
1990	Puppet Master II	Mathew	
1991	The Giant of Thunder Mountain	Oliver Crow	
1991	Party Plane	N/A	Screenplay co-writer (with Ed Hansen)
1991	Soldier's Fortune	T. Max	
1991	Death Falls	N/A	Screenplay co-writer (with John F. Goff)
1991	976-Evil II	Turrell	
1992	Mirror Images	Wolfman	
1992	Waxwork II: Lost in Time	Sarah's Stepfather	
1992	The Bikini Carwash Company	N/A	Screenplay co-writer (with Ed Hansen); producer
1992	Munchie	Rich Tramp	
1993	The Bikini Carwash Company II	N/A	Co-writer of characters (with Ed Hansen)
1993	Warlock: The Armageddon	Man In Crowd	
1993	Skeeter	Filo	
1994	Plughead Rewired: Circuitry Man II	Jerry	
1994	The Magic of Golden Bear: Goldy III	Pa	Screenplay co-writer (with Lynette Cahill, Trevor Black, Honey Graham and John Quinn)
1994	Tammy and the T-Rex	Norville	
1995	Ripper Man	Heckler	
1995	Hell's Belles	N/A	Screenplay co-writer (with Ed Hansen and Simon Hartwell); producer
1995	Hard Bounty	Harper	
1995	Village of the Damned	Carlton	
1995	Takin' It Off Out West	Pappy Putz	Screenplay co-writer (with Ed Hansen and John F. Goff); producer
1996	Fast Money	Window Washer	
1996	Dark Breed	Homeless Man	
1996	Forest Warrior	Barney	
1996	Running Hard	Elk	
1997	Black Dawn	Drunken Man	
1997	Champions	Chip	
1997	Executive Target	Window Washer	
1997	Wishmaster	Homeless Man	
1997	Moonbase	Murdoch	
1997	Fallen Angel	Jeffery	
1997	Bloodsuckers	Grampa	
1999	Silicon Towers	Truck Driver	
2000	Flamingo Dreams	Wino	
2000	Bring Him Home	Theron	
2000	Radical Jack	Lloyd	
2001	Crash Point Zero	Edward Simmons	
2001	Perfect Fit	Prison Guard	
2001	Wooly Boys	N/A	Screenplay co-writer (with Ed Hansen, Annie DeYoung, Glen Stephens and Max Enscoe)
2004	Curse of the Komodo	Cashier	

=== Television ===
Year	Title	Role	Notes
1975	Lincoln	Juror	Episode: "Prairie Lawyer"
1975	The Invisible Man	Bunker Guard	Episode: "Go Directly to Jail"
1977	The Cliffwood Avenue Kids	Uncle Billy	TV series
1978	Big Bob Johnson and His Fantastic Speed Circus	Bert	TV movie
1978	Time Machine	Unnamed	TV movie
1980	The Dukes of Hazzard	Coy Randolph	Episode: "Jude Emery"
1980–1981	Flo	Roy	8 Episodes
1981	Palmerstown, U.S.A.	Roy	Episode: "Scandal"
1987	Bates Motel	Vagrant	TV movie
1989	L.A. Law	Henry Broder	Episode: "America The Beautiful"
1989	Guns of Paradise	Dr. Jefferies	Episode: "A Gathering of Guns"
1989	Sister Kate	Unknown	Episode: "Neville's Hired Hand"
1990	Nutz, Yutz and Klutz	Unknown	Episode: "All Washed Up"
1990	They Came from Outerspace	Willie Tyrell	Episode: "Rodeo Romeos"
1992–1995	Renegade	Hobo / Bum	2 Episodes
1993	Body Bags	Stranger	TV movie
1993	The Adventures of Brisco County, Jr.	49'er	Episode: "Socrates Sister"
1995	Live Shot	Unnamed	Episode: "What Price Episode?"
1996	Night Stand with Dick Dietrick	Lester	Episode: "The Self-Improvement Show"
1997	Skeletons	Jerry Grommer	TV movie
1997	NYPD Blue	Moe	Episode: "A Draining Experience"
1997	ER	Lamont	Episode: "Fathers and Sons"
1998	Beyond Belief: Fact or Fiction	Retired Man	Episode: "They Towed My Car"
1998	Brooklyn South	Manus Bleeker	Episode: "Tears on My Willow"
1998	Dr. Quinn, Medicine Woman	Bret Calvert	Episode: "Legend II: Vengeance"
1998	Power Rangers in Space	Bearded Man	Episode: "Countdown to Destruction: Part 2"
1999	The Pretender	Motel Manager	Episode: "The World's Changing"
2000	Power Rangers Lightspeed Rescue	Homeless Man	Episode: "The Great Egg Caper"
2001	18 Wheels of Justice	Sam	Episode: "Hot Cars, Fast Women"
2001	Power Rangers Time Force	Bartender	Episode: "Movie Madness: Part 1"
2004	They Are Among Us	Old Chuck	TV movie
