= The Bus Is Coming =

The Bus Is Coming Ghetto Revenge
- Directed by: Wendell James Franklin
- Written by: Horace Jackson
- Produced by: Horace Jackson; Herbert H. Dow
- Starring: Mike B. Simms; Burl Bullock
- Cinematography: Mike Rhodes
- Edited by: Donald R. Rode
- Music by: Tom McIntosh
- Production company: K-Calb Productions
- Distributed by: William Thompson Productions Incorporated
- Release date: 1971
- Running time: 107 minutes
- Country: United States
- Language: English

The Bus Is Coming (also known as Ghetto Revenge) is a 1971 American drama film written by Horace Jackson. The film is directed by Wendell James Franklin and stars Mike B. Simms and Burl Bullock.

== Plot ==
The film is about the death of a prominent Black community member Joe Mitchell, who served on the school board. "The Black Fist," a local black power political organization wants to hold a rally in response to Mitchell's death because the "town must pay it's dues". Billy Mitchell, Joe's brother returns from the Vietnam War and investigates Joe's death. He becomes aware of a gang of racist cops, and eventually joins The Black Fist group to seek revenge.

== Cast ==
- Mike B. Simms as Billy Mitchell
- Burl Bullock as Michael
- Stephanie Faulkner as Tanya
- Morgan Jones as Tim Naylor
- Robert Brubaker as Chief Jackson
- Sandra Reed as Miss Nickerson

== Reception ==
Howard Thompson of The New York Times called the film "strong, probing and impressively balanced". TV Guide wrote that the film "manages to address the racial issues while telling an interesting, albeit melodramatic story."

Richard Leary of The Village Voice called the acting "amateurish", the direction "pedestrian", and the production "shoe-string". John Little of The Pittsburgh Press called the film "angry" and wrote that "the anger overcomes the effort". Sharon Scott of The Pittsburgh Courier wrote a negative review of the film.
