= Dimension Pictures (1970s company) =

Defunct American film studio

Dimension Pictures Incorporated
- Industry: Motion picture
- Predecessor: Woolner Brothers Pictures, Inc.
- Founded: 1971; 55 years ago
- Founder: Lawrence Woolner
- Defunct: 1981; 45 years ago
- Fate: Liquidation After Filing For Bankruptcy
- Successor: 21st Century Film Corporation
- Headquarters: Los Angeles, California, United States

Dimension Pictures Incorporated (DPI) was an American film studio founded in 1971, which primarily released exploitation and horror films. The studio underwent liquidation in 1981, after which many of its films were acquired by 21st Century Film Corporation.

== History ==
Dimension was founded by Lawrence Woolner, an exhibitor who had made a number of films, including several with Roger Corman. He hired the husband and wife team of Stephanie Rothman and Charles S. Swartz to run the filmmaking division. Funds came from Sam Pulitzer, head of the Wembley Neckware Company who wanted to invest in movies.

Rothman and Swartz left in 1975. She says that Pulitzer pulled out of the company by then and Wolmer did not want to renew his contract with the filmmakers. Rothman:

That was just as well, in our opinion, because we could see that, the way he was managing the company, it wasn’t likely to be very successful, and that what was happening is that a few pictures made money and the rest didn’t. A lot of it had to do with the kind of material that he was selecting. While he would ask our opinion of these projects, he wouldn’t necessarily agree with it, and he tended, in our opinion, to pick projects that were not as promising and were not as likely to be commercial.

Dimension Pictures filed for Chapter 7 bankruptcy on January 30, 1981. New York-based distributors Tom Ward and Art Schweitzer of 21st Century Distribution Corporation put in an offer for part of the Dimension catalog at the AAFMM in April of that year and acquired 28 of the films (roughly 80% of the library) for $2 million. The rights to seven of the films were limited to U.S. and Canada only, the other 21 were worldwide. Those titles included Terminal Island, The Twilight People, Group Marriage, Cheering Section, Dr. Minx, The Muthers, The Greatest Battle, Out of the Darkness, Satan's Cheerleaders, The Human Tornado, The Redeemer, Beyond Atlantis, Legend of the Wolf Woman, Tomcats, Sweet Sugar, The Working Girls, Smooth Velvet, Raw Silk, Ebony, Ivory & Jade, and Kingdom of the Spiders. 21st Century reissued most of their Dimension acquisitions to theaters in the New York tri-state area in late 1981 and '82, and all titles were eventually released on VHS through VCI, United Home Entertainment, and Continental Video.

After Menahem Golan took control of 21st Century in 1989, he used the acquisition of the Dimension library of films to hire William Shatner to write and direct a sequel to Kingdom of the Spiders and announced the film at the AFM. Shatner supplied the film's premise, which would have featured a man being tortured by his enemies, preying upon his intense fear of spiders, to get him to reveal a secret. The sequel was never made.

== Select filmography ==
- The Twilight People (1972)
- The Sin of Adam & Eve (1972)
- Sweet Sugar (1972)
- Group Marriage (1973)
- The Doberman Gang (1973)
- The Devil's Wedding Night (1973)
- The Three Dimensions of Greta 3-D (1973)
- Invasion of the Bee Girls (1973)
- Terminal Island (1973)
- The Daring Dobermans (1973)
- Beyond Atlantis (1973)
- 'Gator Bait (1973)
- The Single Girls (1973)
- A Place Without Parents (1974)
- Tough (1974)
- The Working Girls (1974)
- Love in 3-D (1974)
- Scum of the Earth (1974)
- Boss Nigger (1975)
- Brother, Can You Spare a Dime? (1975)
- Not Now Darling (1975)
- Dr. Minx (1975)
- Dolemite (1975)
- Lady Cocoa (1975)
- Dr. Black, Mr. Hyde (1976)
- Dixie Dynamite (1976)
- Ebony, Ivory & Jade (1976)
- The Human Tornado (1976)
- Black Shampoo (1976)
- The Bad Bunch (1976)
- The Muthers (1976)
- Drive-In Massacre (1976)
- Exit the Dragon, Enter the Tiger (1976)
- Lover Doll (1976)
- Super Dude (1976)
- Return to Boggy Creek (1977)
- Joey (1977)
- Legend of the Wolf Woman (1977)
- Ruby (1977)
- Kingdom of the Spiders (1977)
- Cheering Section (1977)
- Tomcats (1977)
- Bad Georgia Road (1977)
- The Great Smokey Roadblock (1977)
- Out of the Darkness (1978)
- The Redeemer (1978)
- Hi-Riders (1978)
- Smooth Velvet, Raw Silk (1978)
- Swap Meet (1979)
- The Great American Girl Robbery (1979)
- Satan's Cheerleaders (1979)
- The Greatest Battle (1979)
- Screams of a Winter Night (1979)
- Stone Cold Dead (1980)
- Dinner for Adele (1980)

== Sources ==
- Holmlund, Chris (2005). Contemporary American Independent Film: From the Margins to the Mainstream. Psychology Press. ISBN 978-0-415-25486-1.
