= The Daring Dobermans =

- Theatrical release poster
- Directed by: Byron Ross Chudnow
- Written by: Alan Alch; Jack Kaplan
- Produced by: David Chudnow
- Starring: Charles Knox Robinson; Tim Considine; Joan Caulfield; David Moses
- Cinematography: Robert Caramico
- Edited by: Herman Freedman
- Music by: Robert O. Ragland
- Distributed by: Dimension Pictures
- Release date: July 1973
- Running time: 90 minutes
- Country: United States
- Language: English

The Daring Dobermans is a 1973 American crime comedy film directed by Byron Ross Chudnow. It is a sequel to The Doberman Gang. It picks up where its predecessor left off, with the six Doberman Pinschers in the wilderness after having followed a rogue Bulldog at nightfall.

== Plot ==
Three men track down a pack of dobermans and, along with a young Native American boy, train the dogs to rob the campaign funds of a politician.

== Cast ==
- Charles Knox Robinson as Steve Crandall
- Tim Considine as Warren
- Joan Caulfield as Claudia (credited as Miss Joan Caulfield)
- David Moses as Greg
- Claudio Martinez as Billy
- Tom Dever as Jim "Jimbo"
- George Buck Flower as Luther (credited as Buck Flower)
- Gale Jensen as Marcie
- Richard Stahl as Winston
- John War Eagle as Grandfather (credited as John Wareagle)
- Cory Brandon as Blake
- Larry French as Berry
- Diane Prior as Receptionist

== See also ==
- List of American films of 1973
