= The Bikini Carwash Company =

1992 film by Ed Hansen

- DVD cover
- Directed by: Ed Hansen
- Written by: Ed Hansen; George Buck Flower
- Produced by: Alan B. Bursteen; George Buck Flower
- Starring: Joe Dusic; Kristi Ducati; Rikki Brando
- Cinematography: Gary Dean Orona
- Edited by: Jose Ponce
- Music by: Donald Mixon
- Production company: New City Releasing
- Distributed by: Sterling Home Entertainment; Imperial Entertainment
- Release date: June 17, 1992
- Running time: 87 minutes
- Country: United States
- Language: English

The Bikini Carwash Company is a 1992 sex comedy film directed by Ed Hansen. It stars Joe Dusic, Kristi Ducati and Rikki Brando. A sequel, The Bikini Carwash Company II, directed by Gary Dean Orona, was released in 1993.

Writer George Buck Flower had guest starred in an episode of a modern Three Stooges style show, Nutz, Yutz and Klutz set in a car wash, shot in 1990 and was inspired to make a car wash as a locale for a prettier cast of characters.

== Plot ==
In the film, a group of young women decide to help out a local car wash by wearing bikinis while they wash customers' cars. This succeeds in attracting more customers, more money, and more attention from the police, who are not amused by the scantily-dressed employees.

== Cast ==
- Joe Dusic as Jack McGowan
- Kristi Ducati as Melissa Reese
- Rikki Brando as Amy Windslow
- Sara Suzanne Brown as Sunny (credited as Suzanne Browne)
- Neriah Davis as Rita (credited as Neriah Napaul)
- Brook Lynn Page as Tammy Joe
- Eric Ryan as Stanley
- Scott James as Big Bruce (credited as Scott Strohmyer)
- Patrick M. Wright as Uncle Elmer (credited as Michael Wright)
- Kimberly Bee as Bobbie Canova
- Jim Wynorski as Ralph
- Darrell Mapson as Snuff (credited as Duane Matson)
- Matthew Cory Dunn as Donovan Drake
- Jack Klarr as Judge Hawthorne
- Landon Hall as Miss Hawthorne
- John F. Goff as A. B. Quinn (credited as Jake Barnes)
- Patrick McKelly as Sergeant Shag Sutton
- Suzanne Ager as Foxy (credited as Amy Page)
- Yvette Young as 2nd Stripper
- Tiffany Adell as 3rd Stripper
- Missy Warner as Awesome Beach Girl (credited as Jennifer Irwin)
- Maxi Neva as 2nd Beach Girl
- Ashley Jones as 3rd Beach Girl
- Gary A. Rubin as Passerby at Carwash (credited as Gary Rubin)
