= Takin' It All Off =

- Directed by: Ed Hansen
- Written by: George Buck Flower; Ed Hansen
- Starring: Kitten Natividad; Candie Evans; Fred Hampton; Becky LeBeau; George Buck Flower
- Edited by: Ed Hansen
- Music by: Don Ralke
- Production company: Hansen/Gervasoni Production Company
- Release date: 1987
- Running time: 91 min.
- Country: United States
- Language: English

Takin' It All Off is a 1987 American sex comedy film directed by Ed Hansen and co-written by George Buck Flower and Hansen. The cast features Kitten Natividad playing "Betty Big Ones", as well as Candie Evans, John F. Goff, and Farley Maynard. Produced by the Hansen / Gervasoni Production Company, it was a sequel to Hansen and Robert T. Gervasoni's 1985 film Takin' It Off.

== Plot ==
A school for striptease artists is in financial trouble. The students audition for the owner of the Chez Bob A Ree Bob, a renowned strip club, except for the glamorous newcomer, Allison, who cannot bring herself to take her clothes off in public. Veteran stripper Betty "Big Ones" suggests hypnotism, and although this helps Allison to shed her shyness, and her clothes, it has the unfortunate side-effect of making her strip whenever she hears the film's theme song, which gets played everywhere.

== Cast ==
- Kitten Natividad as Betty "Big Ones"
- Candie Evans as Allison
- Farley Maynard as Murray
- Becky LeBeau as Becky
- George Buck Flower as Allison's Father
