= List of Playboy Playmates of 1994 =

The following is a list of Playboy Playmates of 1994, the 40th anniversary year of the publication. Playboy magazine names their Playmate of the Month each month throughout the year.

== January ==
Anna-Marie Goddard

Playboy centerfold appearance
- January 1994

Personal details
- Born: January 13, 1970 (age 56) Ysbrechtum, Netherlands
- Height: 5 ft 9 in (1.75 m)

Anna-Marie Goddard is a Dutch model and actress. She is Playboy magazine's Playmate of the Month for January 1994, the magazine's 40th Anniversary issue. In her native country of the Netherlands, she became the 1995 Playmate of the Year for the Playboy magazine published in that country.

== February ==
Julie Lynn Cialini

Playboy Playmate of the Year
- 1995
- Preceded by: Jenny McCarthy
- Succeeded by: Stacy Sanches

Personal details
- Born: November 14, 1970 (age 56) Rochester, New York, U.S.
- Height: 5 ft 11 in (1.80 m)

Julie Lynn Cialini (born Julie Lynn Smith on November 14, 1970, in Rochester, New York) is an American model and actress who graduated in 1988 from East Rochester High School. She is Playboy magazine's Playmate of the Month for February 1994 and Playmate of the Year for 1995. Cialini appeared in a number of Playboy videos including the Wet and Wild and Sexy Lingerie series. She also appeared as a model on the Doug Davidson version of the game show The Price Is Right.

== March ==
Neriah Davis

Playboy centerfold appearance
- March 1994

Personal details
- Born: October 12, 1972 (age 54) Van Nuys, California, U.S.
- Height: 5 ft 8 in (1.73 m)

Neriah Davis (born October 12, 1972) is an American model and actress. She is Playboy magazine's Playmate of the Month for March 1994. Davis was born in Van Nuys, California, a child of agrarian hippies, growing up on an organic farm with no electricity in Northern California's Sierra Nevada mountains. When she was 18, she left the commune and moved to Los Angeles. Davis soon found modeling and acting work and landed her first acting role as "Rita" in The Bikini Carwash Company, in which she was credited as Neriah Napaul. This led to parts in Meatballs 4 and The Bikini Carwash Company II, establishing her acting career before appearing in Playboy. While working on a photo shoot, the photographer asked if he could send some of her shots to the magazine. Davis agreed, and shortly thereafter, she became a Playboy Playmate.

Since appearing in Playboy, Davis continued with modeling and acting projects, including roles on Baywatch, Married... with Children, and Suddenly Susan. Davis was a St. Pauli Girl. She modeled for lingerie company Frederick's of Hollywood, along with fellow Playboy Playmate Nikki Schieler, and she formerly maintained her official website. Davis met her husband Anthony Darby, a general contractor, in 2006 and the couple raise their daughter and her son in Sonora, California. Davis became a photographer and started her photography business, Neriah Fox Photo; shooting photos for weddings, the San Francisco 49ers Cheerleader calendar, and portraits of Sean Connery and Willie Nelson.

== April ==
Becky DelosSantos
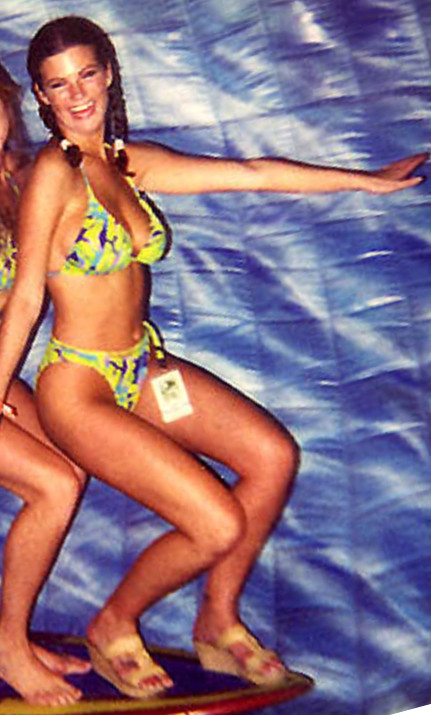
- Becky DelosSantos at the 2000 Playboy Wet and Wild Bikini Fashion Show

Playboy centerfold appearance
- April 1994

Personal details
- Born: August 16, 1969 (age 57) Boston, Massachusetts, U.S.
- Height: 5 ft 10 in (1.78 m)

Becky DelosSantos (born August 16, 1969) is an American model and actress. She is Playboy magazine's Playmate of the Month for April 1994, and has appeared in several Playboy videos.

== May ==
Shae Marks

Playboy centerfold appearance
- May 1994

Personal details
- Born: June 1, 1972 (age 54) New Orleans, Louisiana, US
- Height: 5 ft 4 in (1.63 m)

Christy Shae Marks (born June 1, 1972) is an American model and actress of Cherokee, Irish, and French heritage. She is Playboy magazine's Playmate of the Month for May 1994, and became a traveling representative for the company. As an actress, she performed on TV shows including Married... with Children, Renegade, Viper, and Baywatch. She retired from public life in 2005.

== June ==
Elan Carter

Playboy centerfold appearance
- June 1994

Personal details
- Born: July 3, 1969 (age 57) Nutley, New Jersey, U.S.
- Height: 5 ft 9 in (1.75 m)

Elan Carter (born July 3, 1969) is an American model and actress, born in Nutley, New Jersey. She is Playboy magazine's Playmate of the Month for June 1994. She has also appeared in numerous Playboy videos. She is the step-daughter of Otis Williams, co-founder and last surviving founding member of The Temptations.

== July ==
Traci Adell

Playboy centerfold appearance
- July 1994

Personal details
- Born: February 17, 1969 (age 57) New Orleans, Louisiana, U.S.
- Height: 5 ft 11 in (1.80 m)

Traci Adell (born February 17, 1969, in New Orleans, Louisiana; also known as Traci Sikkink) is an American model and actress. She is Playboy magazine's Playmate of the Month for July 1994. She has also appeared in numerous Playboy videos.

== August ==
Maria Checa

Playboy centerfold appearance
- August 1994

Personal details
- Born: July 29, 1970 (age 56) Bogotá, Colombia
- Height: 5 ft 2 in (1.57 m)

Maria Checa (born July 29, 1970) is a Colombian-American model and actress. She is Playboy magazine's Playmate of the Month for August 1994. Her centerfold was photographed by Richard Fegley.

On December 18, 2008, Checa was named in a legal complaint over insider trading involving her then-boyfriend.

== September ==
Kelly Gallagher (now known as Kelly Wearstler)

Playboy centerfold appearance
- September 1994

Personal details
- Born: November 21, 1967 (age 58) Myrtle Beach, South Carolina, U.S.
- Height: 5 ft 6 in (1.68 m)

Kelly Gallagher (born Kelly Wearstler November 21, 1967 in Myrtle Beach, South Carolina) is an American interior designer. She is Playboy magazine's Playmate of the Month for September 1994. She is also known for being a judge on Top Design.

== October ==
Victoria Zdrok
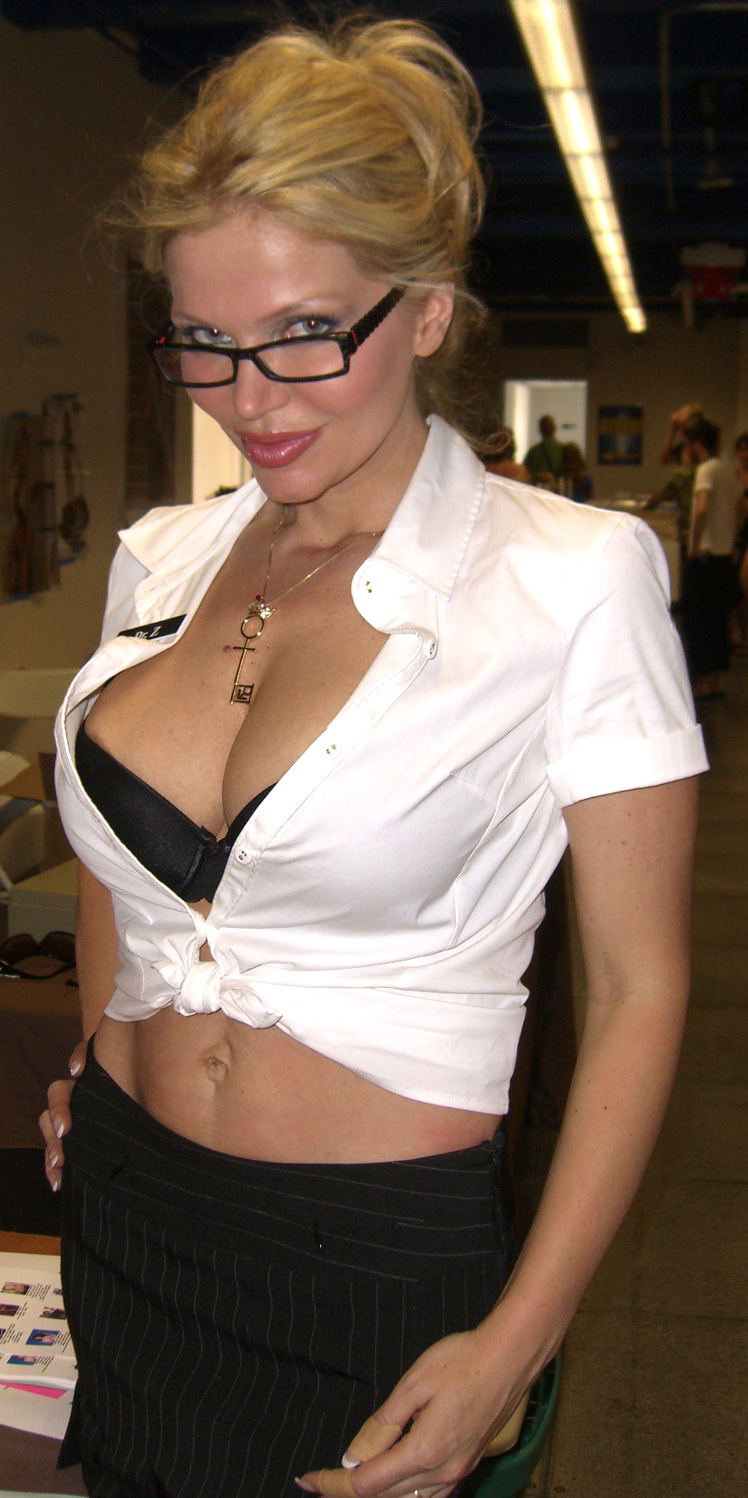

Playboy centerfold appearance
- October 1994

Personal details
- Born: 3 March 1973 (age 53) Kyiv, Ukraine
- Height: 5 ft 9 in (1.75 m)

Victoria Nika Zdrok (born 3 March 1973) is an American author, model, and actress. She is Playboy magazine's Playmate of the Month for October 1994. In June 2002, she became Penthouse magazine's Pet of the Month, later being chosen as their 2004 Penthouse Pet of the Year. Zdrok is also a performer in adult videos, an attorney, a clinical psychologist, and a sex therapist. She is the author of The 30-Day Sex Solution (2011) with her husband John Wilson.

== November ==
Donna Perry
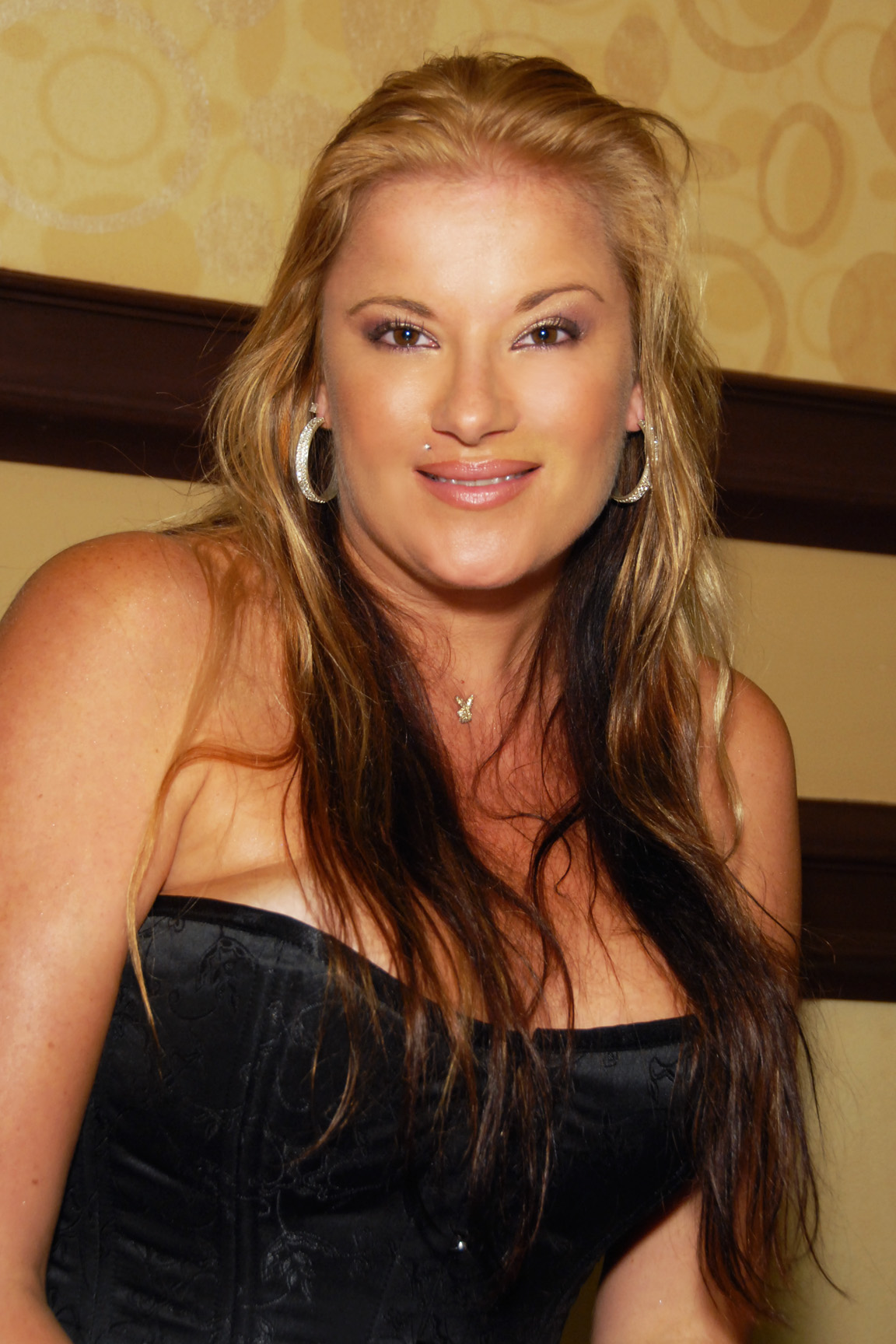
- Donna Perry, Los Angeles, on October 1, 2011

Playboy centerfold appearance
- November 1994

Personal details
- Born: March 2, 1971 (age 55) Glendale, California, U.S.
- Height: 5 ft 11 in (1.80 m)

Donna Perry (born March 2, 1971) is an American model and actress. She is Playboy magazine's Playmate of the Month for November 1994. She lives on the island of Oahu and works at a local hospital.

== December ==
Elisa Bridges

Playboy centerfold appearance
- December 1994

Personal details
- Born: May 24, 1973 Miami, Florida, U.S.
- Died: February 7, 2002 (aged 28) Benedict Canyon, Los Angeles, California, U.S.
- Height: 5 ft 6 in (1.68 m)

Elisa Rebeca Bridges (May 24, 1973 – February 7, 2002) was an American model and actress. She is Playboy magazine's Playmate of the Month for December 1994, and Playboy's Video Playmate of the Month for September 1996. Bridges was born in Miami and raised in Houston. She appeared in several video productions from Playboy Home Video from 1996 to 2000. After appearing in Playboy, she modeled frequently on assignments in Los Angeles, Miami, and Hawaii.

On February 7, 2002, she was found unresponsive in a guest bedroom of a male friend's upscale home in Benedict Canyon, Los Angeles. Her friend knew she had an appointment that day and became concerned after arriving home that evening and finding her car still in the driveway. Although Playboy stated that she died of natural causes, the official coroner's report listed her cause of death as "acute intoxication by the combined effects of heroin, methamphetamine, meperidine and alprazolam".

== See also ==
- List of people in Playboy 1990–1999

Anna-Marie Goddard	Julie Lynn Cialini	Neriah Davis	Becky DelosSantos	Shae Marks	Elan Carter
Traci Adell	Maria Checa	Kelly Gallagher	Victoria Zdrok	Donna Perry	Elisa Bridges
