= Vegas (1978 TV series) =

American crime drama television series (1978–1981)

- Title screen from the first episode
- Genre: Crime drama Mystery
- Created by: Michael Mann
- Starring: Robert Urich; Bart Braverman; Phyllis Davis; Judy Landers; Naomi Stevens; Tony Curtis; Greg Morris
- Theme music composer: Dominic Frontiere
- Composers: John Beal; Dominic Frontiere; Artie Kane
- Country of origin: United States
- Original language: English
- No. of seasons: 3
- No. of episodes: 68 (list of episodes)

Production
- Executive producers: Aaron Spelling; Douglas S. Cramer
- Producer: E. Duke Vincent
- Running time: 55 minutes
- Production company: Aaron Spelling Productions

Original release
- Network: ABC
- Release: September 20, 1978 – June 3, 1981

Vegas (stylized as VEGA$) is an American crime drama television series starring Robert Urich that aired on ABC from September 20, 1978, to June 3, 1981, with the pilot episode airing April 25, 1978. Vegas was produced by Aaron Spelling and was created by Michael Mann. The series (with the exception of special episodes filmed in Hawaii and San Francisco) was filmed in its entirety on location in Las Vegas, Nevada.

Urich stars as private detective Dan Tanna, who drives to his detective assignments around the streets of Las Vegas in a flashy red 1957 Ford Thunderbird convertible. (The 1957 red T-Bird replaced a 1967 yellow Chevrolet Corvette that was Tanna's car in the pilot episode, a car which ended up being destroyed by fire.) Working for a wide variety of Las Vegas clients, the detective work included locating missing persons, helping solve various Las Vegas hotel and casino crimes, solving casino chip and money scams, and working to make Las Vegas a safer place for residents and tourists alike. Dan Tanna makes a point of not accepting divorce cases, or working as a bodyguard. Being in Las Vegas, Tanna is occasionally hired to work for well-known celebrity clients who have issues regarding their personal safety, and need help solving personal issues or threats against them.

== Plot ==
Dan Tanna (Robert Urich) is a high-end Las Vegas private detective, whose many different clients include series regular Philip 'Slick' Roth (Tony Curtis), the owner of several hotel casinos, including the Maxim Hotel Casino and the Desert Inn hotel and country club in Las Vegas. Tanna is often called by private citizens to help investigate unsolved criminal cases, locate missing family or business associates, or even work in rather absurd situations, such as the property case of a nun, played by Cassie Yates, who has a claim deed that says she owns the Las Vegas land on which the Desert Inn Hotel Casino stands. Tanna has the reputation of being a high-risk crime problem-solver; thus, he will not accept bodyguard assignments or handle divorce cases. Given that many of his detective cases are dangerous, he carries a powerful sidearm at all times.

Tanna lives on the Las Vegas Strip next to the Circus Circus hotel/casino, in the theatrical showroom props warehouse owned by the Desert Inn. The large props warehouse where he lives has been partially converted into his living quarters. The unique garage design of Tanna's home allows him to park his red Ford Thunderbird convertible in his living room. Tanna also uses gadgets considered high-tech for the very late 1970s, such as a radio car phone, and an answering machine that physically picks his phone off the hook and into the microphone of a tape recorder.

Two snow days, rare events in Las Vegas, were worked into the plots of separate episodes.

Longtime gaming executive Burton Cohen, a leading figure in Las Vegas casinos since the mid-1960s and three-time president of the Desert Inn, including a period from 1978 to the mid-1980s when the series was being produced, appeared as himself in three episodes; also the public address system of the Desert Inn could be heard loudly announcing several times during almost every episode: "Paging Mr. Cohen, Mr. Burton Cohen."

== Cast and characters ==
=== Main cast ===
- Robert Urich as Dan Tanna
- Bart Braverman as Bobby 'Binzer' Borso
- Phyllis Davis as Beatrice Travis
- Greg Morris as Lt. David Nelson
- Naomi Stevens as Sgt. Bella Archer (Season 1)
- Tony Curtis as Philip (Slick) Roth
- Judy Landers as Angie Turner (Season 1)
- Will Sampson as Harlon Twoleaf (Seasons 1 and 2)

=== Characters ===
Dan Tanna (Urich) is a tough, but also very smart and sensitive, Las Vegas private detective. He tries to be thorough and professional with his work, carefully tracking down the pieces of evidence needed to solve a wide variety of criminal and civil cases. Various Vegas episodes document, through flashbacks, Tanna's dangerous combat experiences in the Vietnam War. Though Dan Tanna carries a handgun he flashes and even fires in self defense when necessary, he also tries to use his intelligence and his many Las Vegas connections to solve crimes and solve cases. Tanna tools around Las Vegas, and Nevada, in his beautiful 1957 red Ford Thunderbird.

Beatrice Travis (Phyllis Davis), Tanna's Girl Friday, is a widowed single mother who moonlights in season 1 as a Las Vegas showgirl. As she takes on more responsibilities as Tanna's assistant, her showgirl role diminishes. Though Bea and Tanna make a dashing couple, their relationship is platonic, except for occasional friendly kisses. Beatrice pushes Tanna to try to stay busy, often saying to him on the phone, "earn some money, honey", and they appeared to be close personal friends throughout the 69 episodes of Vegas.

Phillip "Slick" Roth (Tony Curtis) is Tanna's primary client and lead generator. Roth is a self-made millionaire, a hands-on businessman, who owns and manages both the Desert Inn Resort and the Maxim Hotel Casino in Las Vegas. Though he is sarcastic and hard-bitten, Roth sincerely likes Dan Tanna, and often expresses how much he treasures Tanna's loyalty, and feels he has a father-son relationship with him. 'Slick' (as Dan likes to call him) made 17 episode appearances throughout the three-year prime-time run of Vegas. He relies on Tanna to help him in a wide variety of criminal and civil cases involving his businesses. Though he is now a wealthy man, he always remembers the stressful and tough times before he was wealthy, and he often exhibits an earthy and self-deprecating sense of humor in his dealings with Dan Tanna, the casino and hotel guests, his showroom employees and showgirls, and the many other employees on his hotel staff. Curtis is prominently featured in the opening credits of each episode, even when not appearing and receiving no on-screen credit.

Dave Nelson (Greg Morris) is a lieutenant with the Las Vegas Metropolitan Police Department, and while he is a no-nonsense officer, he often backs up Tanna in criminal case investigations, and vice versa. While Lt. Nelson is never one to breach police protocol, he sometimes secretly assists Tanna in criminal cases on which his police force is prohibited from officially working. In the first season of Vegas, Nelson had a more adversarial relationship with Tanna, but their working friendship grows over the next two seasons. In the pilot, Nelson's first name was George, and in a later episode was named Burt, and played by Raymond St. Jacques.

Bella Archer (Naomi Stevens) is a sergeant in the Las Vegas Metro police department who also assists both Tanna and Nelson in criminal-case research. Bella filed criminal cases in the police department, and while she was sarcastic, she was also adept at giving Dan Tanna inside criminal information whenever possible. Bella Archer appeared only in the first Vegas season.

Binzer (Bart Braverman) assists with Tanna's detective leg work, and also moonlights part time as a pool assistant at the Desert Inn. Early in the Vegas series, Binzer is revealed to be a former petty thief who fled to Las Vegas to escape his former partners in crime back east. His criminal background is described in one Vegas episode, in which Binzer's real name is revealed to be Robert (Bobby) Borso. Always the protective detective, Dan Tanna invariably seems to take Binzer under his wing, and wisely uses Binzer's knowledge of the streets, and his connections to the Las Vegas street scene. Bart Braverman appeared in the pilot episode as an unnamed character (possibly a pimp or the henchman of one) that Tanna shakes down for information concerning the disappearance of a young woman. During the shakedown, Tanna, possibly out of surprise that he extracted the information rather easily, tells him he is "not cut out for this kind of work". If this was actually the foundation for the introduction of Binzer's character, it is never revealed.

Angie (Judy Landers), is Tanna's secondary office assistant; Angie is a part-time working showgirl. Unlike the savvy and clever Beatrice, Angie is sweet, but also somewhat scatterbrained, and occasionally gets case work and names mixed up. Angie does not appear in Vegas after the first season, with Bea assuming virtually all office-related responsibilities.

Harlon Twoleaf (Will Sampson) is Tanna's close friend who served with him in the Vietnam War, and occasionally assists in some of his detective cases. Twoleaf, who disappeared after the conclusion of the first season, owns a small, working horse ranch, and he enjoys reminiscing with Tanna about their younger days. Twoleaf often is the "muscle" during Tanna's Las Vegas criminal investigations. A proud Native American, his imposing appearance is enough to scare suspects and informants into submission, with little violence actually taking place.

=== Guest stars ===
- Philip Abbott
- Edie Adams
- Julie Adams
- Neile Adams
- Norman Alden
- Muhammad Ali
- Jean Allison
- June Allyson
- Morey Amsterdam
- Tige Andrews
- Michael Ansara
- Royce D. Applegate
- Eve Arden
- R. G. Armstrong
- Hermione Baddeley
- Vincent Baggetta
- Richard Bakalyan
- Belinda Balaski
- Priscilla Barnes
- Dave Barry
- Richard Basehart
- Kim Basinger
- Rhonda Bates
- Noah Beery Jr.
- Barbi Benton
- Shelley Berman
- Vivian Blaine
- Ronee Blakley
- Lloyd Bochner
- Tiffany Bolling
- Eric Braeden
- Peter Breck
- Walter Brooke
- Stephen Brooks
- Peter Brown
- Victor Buono
- Paul Burke
- Dick Butkus
- Red Buttons
- Edd Byrnes
- Sid Caesar
- Michael Callan
- Joseph Campanella
- Darleen Carr
- John Carradine
- Christopher Cary
- Peggy Cass
- Kim Cattrall
- Lonny Chapman
- Leigh Christian
- Dane Clark
- Dennis Cole
- Michael Cole
- John Colicos
- Gary Collins
- Chuck Connors
- Michael Conrad
- Michael Constantine
- Pat Cooper
- Broderick Crawford
- Gary Crosby
- Scatman Crothers
- Ken Curtis
- Bill Dana
- Sybil Danning
- Cesare Danova
- James Darren
- Henry Darrow
- Clifton Davis
- Patti Davis
- Don DeFore
- Don Diamond
- Charles Dierkop
- Troy Donahue
- Tim Donnelly
- Daryl Dragon
- Gary Dubin
- Marta DuBois
- Andrew Duggan
- Jane Dulo
- Gene Dynarski
- Cindy Eilbacher
- Stephen Elliott
- John Ericson
- Gene Evans
- Jason Evers
- Shelley Fabares
- Lola Falana
- Antonio Fargas
- Tommy Farrell
- Minnesota Fats
- Melinda O. Fee
- Ron Feinberg
- Pamelyn Ferdin
- John Fiedler
- Rosemary Forsyth
- Anne Francis
- Pamela Franklin
- Eduard Franz
- Squire Fridell
- Don Galloway
- Michael V. Gazzo
- Christopher George
- Lynda Day George
- Nicholas Georgiade
- Ned Glass
- Bruce Glover
- Lynda Goodfriend
- Don Gordon
- Erin Gray
- Lorne Greene
- Melanie Griffith
- Harry Guardino
- Moses Gunn
- Kim Hamilton
- Janis Hansen
- Bill Harris
- Jo Ann Harris
- Jonathan Harris
- Julius Harris
- Lisa Hartman
- Peter Haskell
- Jill Haworth
- Peter Lind Hayes
- Pamela Hensley
- Catherine Hickland
- Pat Hingle
- Hope Holiday
- Skip Homeier
- Susan Howard
- David Huddleston
- Wilfrid Hyde-White
- Wolfman Jack
- Sherry Jackson
- Anthony James
- Anne Jeffreys
- George Jessel
- Henry Jones
- L. Q. Jones
- Louis Jourdan
- John Karlen
- Noah Keen
- Jack Kelly
- William Kerwin
- Bruce Kirby
- Werner Klemperer
- Stepfanie Kramer
- Jack Kruschen
- Abbe Lane
- John Larch
- Ruta Lee
- Harvey Lembeck
- Michael Lerner
- June Lockhart
- Gary Lockwood
- Robert Loggia
- James Luisi
- Keye Luke
- Ken Lynch
- Richard Lynch
- James MacArthur
- Patrick Macnee
- Dorothy Malone
- Robert Mandan
- Paul Mantee
- Randolph Mantooth
- John Marley
- Garry Marshall
- Lynne Marta
- Frank Marth
- Dean Martin
- Strother Martin
- Marlyn Mason
- Murray Matheson
- Hedley Mattingly
- Whitman Mayo
- Maureen McCormick
- Barbara McNair
- Heather Menzies
- Allan Miller
- Denny Miller
- Cameron Mitchell
- Mary Ann Mobley
- Cindy Morgan
- Phil Morris
- Ed Nelson
- Wayne Newton
- Leslie Nielsen
- Simon Oakland
- Tim O'Connor
- Quinn O'Hara
- Alan Oppenheimer
- Cliff Osmond
- Woodrow Parfrey
- Eleanor Parker
- Barbara Parkins
- Joe Penny
- Nehemiah Persoff
- Jo Ann Pflug
- Barney Phillips
- Michelle Phillips
- Paul Picerni
- Slim Pickens
- Molly Picon
- Don Porter
- Randy Powell
- John Quade
- John Randolph
- Robert Reed
- Clive Revill
- Beah Richards
- Kyle Richards
- Peter Mark Richman
- Rodney Allen Rippy
- Pernell Roberts
- Tanya Roberts
- Andrew Robinson
- Eugene Roche
- Cesar Romero
- Carol Eve Rossen
- John Rubinstein
- Tony Russel
- Steve Sandor
- Isabel Sanford
- Dick Sargent
- John Saxon
- Natalie Schafer
- Jacqueline Scott
- Vito Scotti
- Milton Selzer
- Eric Server
- Johnny Seven
- Doc Severinsen
- David Sheiner
- Pamela Susan Shoop
- Stephen Shortridge
- Tom Simcox
- William Smith
- Louise Sorel
- Tori Spelling
- Raymond St. Jacques
- Jill St. John
- Laraine Stephens
- Christopher Stone
- Harold J. Stone
- Don Stroud
- Barry Sullivan
- Inga Swenson
- George Takei
- Joe E. Tata
- Vic Tayback
- Toni Tennille
- Robert Tessier
- Lauren Tewes
- Kenneth Tobey
- Alex Trebek
- Bobby Van
- Joan Van Ark
- Mamie Van Doren
- John Vernon
- Abe Vigoda
- James Wainwright
- Gregory Walcott
- Tracey Walter
- Vernee Watson
- William C. Watson
- Dawn Wells
- Jill Whelan
- Jason Wingreen
- Shelley Winters
- Morgan Woodward
- Cassie Yates

The Chuck Connors Vega$ episode was filmed at the historic Daydream Ranch. Robert Reed and Maureen McCormick portrayed a father and daughter in a season-one episode, "The Pageant". The duo previously starred together in The Brady Bunch (1969–74), in which Reed portrayed family patriarch Mike, with McCormick as eldest daughter Marcia. In a later episode, Reed reappeared as Phillip Roth's brother.

Robert Mandan and Robert Urich had worked together in the situation comedy Soap. Mandan played Chester Tate, Jessica Tate's husband and Urich as Jessica's lover, Peter the tennis pro, who was murdered by Chester Tate.

Heather Menzies was Robert Urich's real-life wife, and they were married in 1975.

== Production ==
Michael Mann was credited as the creator, although he only had one writing credit for the show with the pilot film in "High Roller", which aired on April 25, 1978. Mann reflected on the show in 2012 on his idea for the show and his feelings on the production.

“I could see the writing on the wall pretty early on when what I called the ‘leisure-suit brigade’ moved in [as producers working for Aaron Spelling] and took over the show. It very quickly became more fluffy. Urich was fine, he was a good performer who could have done the role the way I envisioned it, but he also fit the more breezy, lightweight style they wanted. But I had something more radical in mind. Vega$ was important for me because it began my interest in twilight zones, in areas of activity that were ignored by mass America, for the most part, and that were in the process of change—in this case, the 1950s and ’60s, when Vegas was undergoing a transition from an Outfit-controlled [i.e., organized crime] landscape to a G-rated grind-house. “Las Vegas itself was a wonderful place for a dramatist, because people going to Vegas were still inventing their own dramas when they set foot in the town: They could become whoever they wanted to be, act that out. As a setting, it was a desert with no intrinsic meaning. I saw how things worked while doing research there, clues in the smallest details: You’d see a guy pull up in his car to check into one of the hotels, and a valet would approach him and if the guy reached into his pocket for his wallet, for a tip, the valet started walking faster. If the guy didn’t go for his pocket, or he came out empty-handed, the valet would slow down, even walk away. [Laughs] Stuff like that, I loved: It was so honest that everything was so mercenary!”

Dan Tanna was named after restaurateur Dan Tana, at whose eponymous restaurant Aaron Spelling and E. Duke Vincent were regulars. Tana received a royalty of $500 per episode.

== Episodes ==
=== Episode list ===
Season	Episodes	Originally aired	
Season	Episodes	First aired	Last aired
1	22	September 20, 1978	May 9, 1979
2	23	September 19, 1979	May 7, 1980
3	23	November 5, 1980	June 3, 1981

=== Crossovers ===
In the season-three premiere of Charlie's Angels titled "Angels in Vegas", Robert Urich does a cameo as his Vegas character Dan Tanna at the end of the episode. This episode aired the week before the Vegas series premiere.

== Syndication ==
Vegas began airing in off-network syndication shortly after its cancelation in the early 1980s. It was also one of the first shows to premiere on FX when that channel began in 1994; FX ceased airing episodes around 2000. In July 2015, Vegas aired on the Decades network. In November 2021, Vegas began airing on MeTV+. On August 30, 2022, Vegas began airing on Heroes & Icons as part of the Day Shift programming block.

== Home media ==
CBS DVD (distributed by Paramount) has released all three seasons of Vegas on DVD in a Region 1 box set on May 2, 2017. In Region 4, Madman Entertainment has released the first season on DVD in Australia.

DVD name	Ep #	Release dates	
DVD name	Ep #	Region 1	Region 4
The First Season, Volume 1	11	October 20, 2009	July 14, 2010
The First Season, Volume 2	12	February 9, 2010	September 27, 2010
The Second Season, Volume 1	11	December 7, 2010	TBA
The Second Season, Volume 2	12	March 29, 2011	TBA
The Third and Final Season, Volume 1	11	May 8, 2012	TBA
The Third and Final Season, Volume 2	12	August 14, 2012	TBA

== See also ==
- List of television shows set in Las Vegas
