= Screams of a Winter Night =

- Theatrical release poster
- Directed by: James L. Wilson
- Screenplay by: Richard H. Wadsack
- Produced by: Richard H. Wadsack; James L. Wilson; S. Mark Lovell
- Starring: Matt Borel; Gil Glasgow; Patrick Byers; Mary Agen Cox
- Cinematography: Robert E. Rogers
- Edited by: Gary Ganote; Craig Mayers
- Music by: Don Zimmers
- Production company: Full Moon Pictures
- Distributed by: Dimension Pictures
- Release dates: January 26, 1979 (Shreveport, Louisiana); July 13, 1979 (U.S.)
- Running time: 91 minutes
- Country: United States
- Language: English

Screams of a Winter Night is a 1979 American anthology horror film directed by James L. Wilson and starring Matt Borel, Gil Glasgow, and Mary Agen Cox. Its plot focuses on a group of college students staying in a cabin who tell various scary stories to one another.

== Plot ==
During winter, a college student named John drives nine of his friends for a weekend trip to Lake Durand. Arriving at John's family's ramshackle cabin, the group begin to settle in. Elaine tells her boyfriend, Alan, that she wished they had not gone on the trip. John meanwhile shows Cal the nearby graves of the Durand family, who were mysteriously killed at the cabin, their bodies found scattered across the property. Police surmised a gas explosion as the cause, though Native American locals believed that a powerful spirit called "Shataba," which roams the woods in winter, caused their deaths.

That night, the friends start a fire in the hearth and begin telling scary stories. John tells the tale of the "Moss Point Man," a dwarf-like creature that terrorized a local couple on a date: After running out of gasoline on a country road, Roger left his girlfriend in the car while he walked toward a station. Some time later, she heard scraping on the roof of the car, and discovered Roger hanging dead from a tree. The following morning, the woman was found alive, with human teeth marks on her ankles.

After finishing the story, John shows Cal a newspaper clipping about a bizarre accident that happened at Lake Durand in the 1940s. Next, Steve tells the group the story of the "Green Light," in which three fraternity pledges were instructed to spend the night in a supposedly haunted, abandoned hotel. The three men were warned not to venture to the upper levels of the building, but ultimately did so while investigating a noise; in the morning, the fraternity found the three men in a trance-like state, two of them bleeding, and the third driven mad.

After Steve's story, one of the women, Jookie, becomes unnerved and wishes to leave the cabin. Outside, a howling wind begins to increase in frequency. John and Steve say they are going to town to purchase more oil for the lamps, and instead terrify Sally and Liz by posing in a grotesque gorilla mask in the kitchen window. The aloof Elaine decides to share a story that supposedly happened at her high school: It involves a timid woman named Annie who suffered a date rape attempt, in which she stabbed the attacker to death. Annie claimed a madman had attacked her and her date, absolving her of public guilt, though she grew mentally unbalanced after the incident. Later, in college, a withdrawn Annie brutally murders her dormitory roommate for wearing Annie's shawl without her permission.

Jookie, horrified by Elaine's story, grows frantic. Her boyfriend Harper tries to calm her, and the group contemplate whether they should leave. The wind increasingly rattles the cabin, howling violently. Fearing that the Shataba legend John told him might be true, Cal departs with his girlfriend, Lauri. Suddenly, the wind shatters the living room window, and Elaine is killed by shards of glass. Cal, Lauri, Harper, and Jookie flee into the woods as the cabin collapses from the force of the wind, killing their friends. In the woods at the edge of a precipice, the four survivors hear a growl approaching them.

== Cast ==
- Matt Borel as John/Ron
- Gil Glasgow as Steve/Parker
- Patrick Byers as Cal
- Mary Agen Cox as Elaine
- Robin Bradley as Sally/Annie's roommate
- Ray Gaspard as Harper/Billy
- Beverly Allen as Jookie/Crazy Annie
- Brandy Barrett as Liz
- Charles Rucker as Alan
- Jan Norton as Lauri
- William Ragsdale as The Kid

== Production ==
=== Filming ===
Screams of a Winter Night was shot on location in Natchitoches, Louisiana. Director James L. Wilson had been inspired to direct the film based on the success of several other local filmmakers, such as Charles B. Pierce and Joy Houck. The film's producer, Mark Lovell, was a real estate agent with no background in filmmaking. It was distributed by Dimension Pictures. The special effects in the film were supplied by William T. Cherry III, a local resident of Shreveport.

=== Excised scene ===
A fourth story included in the original cut of the film was excised for its theatrical release; this story featured two young men who are chased by a supernatural entity in a graveyard.

== Release ==
The film premiered in several U.S. cities on July 13, 1979, including Atlanta, Seattle, and New Orleans.

=== Critical response ===
Writing in The Shreveport Times, Joe Leydon deemed the film "sluggish in spots," concluding: "There is a great deal more atmosphere than sense to be found in Screams of a Winter Night." He also compared elements of the film to the 1945 British anthology film Dead of Night. Richard Labonté of the Ottawa Citizen was critical of the film, noting that "none of the stories is the least bit scary... It's enough to induce a good snooze."

Linda Gross of the Los Angeles Times felt the film's direction was "stiff," but overall deemed it "scary, with gruesome, bloody effects."

=== Home media ===
The film was released on VHS in the 1980s, but has never received an official DVD release. The independent home media label Code Red released a Blu-ray edition of the film, the first 200 copies of which were made available for sale on February 8, 2019. These copies sold out within around 30 minutes. The Blu-ray features an extended 121-minute cut of the film, which includes an additional story excised from the theatrical version.

== Sources ==
- Albright, Brian (2012). Regional Horror Films, 1958-1990: A State-by-State Guide with Interviews. Jefferson, North Carolina: McFarland. ISBN 978-0-786-47227-7.
- Thrower, Stephen (2007). Nightmare USA: The Untold Story of the Exploitation Independents. London, England: FAB Press. ISBN 978-1-903-25469-1.
