= Drive-In Massacre =

- Film poster
- Directed by: Stu Segall
- Screenplay by: John F. Goff; George Buck Flower
- Story by: Stu Segall
- Produced by: Stu Segall
- Starring: John F. Goff; Steve Vincent; Douglas Gudbye
- Cinematography: Ken Gibb
- Edited by: T. Howard Chapman
- Production company: S.A.M. Productions
- Distributed by: Dimension Pictures
- Release dates: 1976 (Los Angeles, California)
- Running time: 74 minutes
- Country: United States
- Language: English

Drive-In Massacre is a 1976 American B-movie slasher film written and directed by Stu Segall, and co-written by John F. Goff and George Buck Flower.

== Plot ==
A couple go to a drive-in theater in a rural California town, and are butchered by an unseen assailant, who uses a sword to decapitate the man, and skewer the woman through the neck. Investigating this dual homicide are police detectives Mike Leary and John Koch, who interview the drive-in's boorish manager, Austin Johnson, and the odd custodian, Germy. Germy mentions that a peeping tom likes to cruise the area to watch couples and lone girls, and he is told to try and write down the voyeur's license plate number the next time he sees him.

That night, the killer strikes again, impaling two lovers while they are making out in their vehicle, and leaving a sword behind. To see if the sword belongs to the missing drive-in owner, Germy is brought in to the police station identify it. Germy states that the sword is not a part of the owner's private collection, and tells the detectives that the voyeur was at the drive-in around the time of the latest double murder, and that he managed to write down the man's license plate number. The plate number is connected to Orville Ingleson, whose home the detectives visit. Orville denies any connection to the deaths, but when a bloody cloth is found in his car, he panics, and tries to make a run for it. Orville is caught, and claims the blood was just from a dog he accidentally ran over, which is confirmed by further analysis, forcing the police to let him go.

That evening, the detectives (one of them disguised as a woman) go to a screening at the drive-in, and spot Orville there, even though he had promised to stay away from it. After a customer who had stormed off when his girlfriend refused his advances returns to his car, he discovers that his girlfriend has been beheaded. Leary and Koch rush to Orville's car, and find him dead from a slit throat. Austin and Germy are brought in the station for questioning, and Austin antagonizes the detectives, refusing to close the drive-in without a court order, and firing Germy.

The following evening, Leary and Koch get a call about a machete-wielding man who has just murdered two people being cornered in a warehouse, with a little girl he has taken hostage. The detectives go to the warehouse, and after a chase and stand off, shoot the man dead, learning afterward that he was a mental patient who had escaped only a few hours ago, and thus he cannot be the serial killer.

At the drive-in, Germy collects his things, and goes to the projection booth to confront Austin about which one of them gets to keep the owner's sword collection, and about money he is owed. As soon as Germy enters the booth, the silhouette of Austin being killed with a sword is projected onto the drive-in's screen while a Wild West movie is being featured. Leary and Koch (who want to talk to Austin) arrive just in time to see this, and break into the booth, where they find both Austin and Germy hacked to pieces and the killer gone with no trace.

The film suddenly comes to an abrupt end where an on-screen text states that other drive-ins throughout the country are now being plagued by similar bloodbaths, and that the killer's identity is still unknown. A fake public address then announces that a psychopath is loose in the viewer's own drive-in theater, and urges the audience not to panic, as the police are on their way.

== Cast ==
- John F. Goff as Police Detective Mike Leary
- Steve Vincent as Police Psychologist
- Douglas Gudbye as Charlie "Germy" Garmey
- Verkina Flower as Girl In Warehouse
- Robert E. Pearson as Austin Johnson
- Catherine Barkley as Kathy
- Norman Sheridan as Orville Ingleson
- John Alderman as Jim
- Jacqueline Giroux as Arlene
- Bruce Kimball as Police Detective John Koch
- Marty Gatsby as David
- Sandy Carey as Lori
- Janus Blythe as Alan's Date
- Myron Griffith as Alan
- George Buck Flower as Suspect In Warehouse

== Reception ==
A score of two out of four was given by TV Guide, which wrote "Obviously inspired by Peter Bogdanovich's masterful Targets, Drive-In Massacre has none of its predecessor's insight, intelligence, or craft. Instead, it's an ultracheap slice-and-dice effort that even boasts the tired 'They're coming to get you!' ending designed to make drive-in audiences uncomfortable. Needless to say, the effect is greatly diminished on home video". Oh, the Horror! said the film was "a technical nightmare on all levels" and concluded "Aside from a great opening double death sequence, there really isn't enough happening in the film to recommend it. It's an oddity, but one not worth much more than a single curious glance".
