= Living Between Two Worlds =

- Directed by: Bobby Johnson
- Written by: Horace Jackson
- Produced by: Horace Jackson; Lillye Austin
- Starring: Maye Henderson; Anita Poree; Mimi Dillard; Horace Jackson
- Cinematography: Vilmos Zsigmond
- Edited by: Gene Evans; Frank Gardonyi
- Release date: 1963

Living Between Two Worlds is a 1963 American film and Horace Jackson's debut film. The film was publicized as the first full-length feature film independently financed, written and produced by African Americans with an all African American cast.

== Plot ==
Harvey, an aspiring jazz musician, is pressured by his mother to enter the ministry. Torn between the two, his choice becomes more clear when his sister is raped by two white men.

== Cast ==
- Maye Henderson as Mom
- Anita Poree as Bucky
- Mimi Dillard as Helen
- Horace Jackson as Harvey

== Production and release ==
Living Between Two Worlds had no studio backing so Jackson and co-producer Lillye Austin independently financed the low-budget production. The experience of those working on the film varied. Director Bobby Johnson was a comedian by trade, while the cast, save Jackson, were professionals as were other crew members. Production occurred at the Film Center Independent Studios in Glendale, California and surrounding neighborhoods with principal photography completing in May 1963.

With the help of Wendell James Franklin, an assistant director at Universal Studios, the film secured a Guild-sponsored screening and publicly debuted on December 11, 1963, at the Balboa Theatre in Los Angeles. Showings continued for several weeks filling the theater at capacity and making back a third of the film's costs. With no distributor, Jackson secured showings at a few large cities across the United States with Jackson at times making personal appearances to promote the film.

== Reception ==
Although technical flaws were noted by critics, the filmmakers were applauded for their efforts and their "remarkable achievement". Art Seidebaum of the Los Angeles Times stated "it is a strange experience to see a serious motion picture shot through Negro eyes about Negro people" further noting "Negros see this picture and see themselves, not some unconsciously stereotype...". The California Eagle deemed the film "a classic study of the contemporary problems facing the 'Old Negro' and the emergence of the 'New Negro...'".
