= Nobody's Perfect (American TV series) =

- Genre: Situation comedy
- Directed by: Norman Abbott; Robert Douglas; Gary LaPoten
- Starring: Ron Moody; Cassie Yates; Michael Durrell; Victor Brandt; Tom Williams; Renny Roker
- Country of origin: United States
- Original language: English
- No. of seasons: 1
- No. of episodes: 8

Production
- Executive producer: Norman Barasch
- Producers: Lew Gallo; Chris Hayward; Edward Montagne; Arne Sultan
- Running time: 30 minutes
- Production company: Universal Television

Original release
- Network: ABC
- Release: June 26 – August 28, 1980

Nobody's Perfect is an American sitcom television series, broadcast on ABC, about a bumbling police detective; it aired for two months in 1980, for a total of eight episodes (it was originally intended for their fall 1979 schedule as Hart In San Francisco, but the network pulled it several weeks before its premiere, postponing it until the summer of 1980). In the United Kingdom this program is known as Hart of the Yard, due to the existence of a British comedy also called Nobody's Perfect (which was actually a remake of Maude, and starred an American living in England). It was broadcast in France only once in 1984 on TF1 under the name Cher Inspecteur ("Dear Inspector"), and in Germany it was known as Hart auf Hart ("Worst Comes to Worst").

== Summary ==
British Detective Inspector Roger Hart (Ron Moody) is transferred from Scotland Yard to a police precinct in San Francisco, where his constant bumbling wreaks havoc upon his fellow officers, particularly his new partner Detective Jennifer Dempsey (Cassie Yates) and his superior Lieutenant Vince de Gennaro (Michael Durrell). However, Hart proves to have a great many skills which help him to solve crimes and catch criminals.

Each half-hour episode includes a number of slapstick moments, such as when Hart accidentally knocks Dempsey off a pier and into the water twice in one day. Also, each episode has a laugh track.

== Cast ==
- Ron Moody as Det. Insp. Roger Hart
- Cassie Yates as Det. Jennifer Dempsey
- Michael Durrell as Lt. Vince de Gennaro
- Victor Brandt as Det. Jacobi
- Tom Williams as Det. Grauer
- Renny Roker as Det. Ramsey

== Episodes ==
No.	Title	Directed by	Written by	Original release date
1	"Hart in San Francisco"	Robert Douglas	Chris Hayward, Arne Sultan	June 26, 1980
Clumsy but brilliant Scotland Yard Inspector Jonathan Hart transfers to the San Francisco Police Department.
2	"The Hart Is Good for Jogging"	Norman Abbott	Ken Hecht	July 3, 1980
3	"What's on Third?"	Robert Douglas	Bill Greer, Kathy Greer	July 10, 1980
4	"The Return of the Ocelot"	Robert Douglas	Chris Hayward, Arne Sultan	July 24, 1980
5	"You Gotta Have Hart"	Tony Mordente	Peter Gallay, Mike Marmer	July 31, 1980
Two underworld stooges kidnap Dempsey in the belief that she's their boss's disgruntled girlfriend, who intends to testify against him.
6	"Daddy's Day"	Norman Abbott	Donald Ross, Sandy Veith	August 7, 1980
7	"It Was a Very Good Year"	Robert Douglas	Chris Hayward, Jordan Moffet	August 21, 1980
8	"Hart in Jail"	Norman Abbott	Ken Hecht	August 28, 1980
