= Charles Knox Robinson =

American actor (1932–2006)

- Charles Robinson as Ensign Bordelles in the 1966 Robert Wise production The Sand Pebbles
- Born: Charles Knox Robinson III; April 13, 1932; Orange, New Jersey, U.S.
- Died: July 22, 2006 (aged 74); Palm Springs, California, U.S.
- Other name: Charles Robinson
- Occupations: Stage, television, film actor
- Years active: 1958–2001
- Spouse: Joan (Giovanna) Calistri (1960–2001, her death)

Charles Knox Robinson III (April 13, 1932 — July 22, 2006) was an American actor who appeared in over 80 films and television series over his career. From 1958 through 1971 he was credited as Charles Robinson and, from 1972 onward, his full birth name, Charles Knox Robinson, also became his stage name. His credits have been occasionally commingled with those of younger actor Charlie Robinson who, during an eight-year (1984–92) stint as court clerk Mac Robinson on Night Court had been credited as Charles Robinson.

Robinson's first on-screen billing in a feature film was as one of the title characters in 1962's The Interns. He established the Torchlight Project together with his wife, Joan, which aided, empowered and enriched the lives of impoverished children in foreign countries. He was also a member of many organizations including: the Academy of Motion Picture Arts and Sciences, Screen Actors Guild, American Federation of Television and Radio Artists, Actors' Equity Association, Playwrights/Dramatists Guild and the Academy of Magical Arts.

== Biography ==
Born in the New Jersey township of Orange, he was the son of playwright Charles Knox Robinson II and painter Geraldine O'Loughlin. Siblings include Judith Kirby Robinson, actress, and Toni Stuart Robinson Thalenberg, former actress/academic. He was the maternal cousin of actor Gerald S. O'Loughlin. His theatrical family opened his acting career at age three on Broadway.

Receiving his high school diploma from the private Lawrenceville School, he graduated Phi Beta Kappa and magna cum laude from Princeton University in 1954. He was an English major and had many campus activities, including serving as president of Triangle Club. After graduation, he served in the Army from 1958 to 1962 as an aide-de-camp to a general in the Pentagon, translator and speech writer, attaining the rank of first lieutenant. He also served as a French and Russian language interpreter for the 1984 Olympics.

He married Joan (who wrote under her birth name, Giovanna) Calistri on May 7, 1960, in New York City.

== Career ==
Robinson had co-starring and supporting roles in more than eighty films and television series during his career.

His first film was Splendor in the Grass in the small uncredited role of Johnny Masterson. Some of Robinson's other film appearances include Take Her, She's Mine, Dear Brigitte, Shenandoah, and The Singing Nun.

His many television credits include, 77 Sunset Strip, Alfred Hitchcock Presents, Stoney Burke, The Alfred Hitchcock Hour, Bachelor Father, Ripcord, Laramie, Wagon Train, Gunsmoke, The Virginian, The High Chaparral, Ben Casey, The Munsters, My Three Sons, Cade's County, The Sixth Sense, Mannix, Ironside, Banacek, The F.B.I., Barnaby Jones, Griff, O'Hara, U.S. Treasury, The Manhunter, The Six Million Dollar Man, Adam-12, Emergency!, Mobile One, The Paper Chase, Ellery Queen, Cannon, Flying High, The Hardy Boys/Nancy Drew Mysteries, Airwolf, Switch, Quincy, M.E., Simon & Simon, Finder of Lost Loves, Scarecrow & Mrs. King and The Equalizer.

On Broadway he performed in Tall Story, The Pleasure of His Company and The Good Soup. The first two plays would later become motion pictures with other actors playing the roles he originated.

He was part of the great ensemble cast in Robert Wise's 1966 film The Sand Pebbles. Robinson played Richard Crenna's second in command Ensign Bordelles aboard the fictional Navy gunboat, USS San Pablo, stationed in China. Robinson had a standout scene in which he had to lead his troops under guard of Chinese Nationalist soldiers back to the ship. As the sailors march, they are pummeled by vegetables thrown by the throngs of Chinese citizens. It was one of nine theatrical features in which he appeared during the 1960s, in addition to 23 guest starring roles in TV series episodes.

The 1970s proved to be an even busier decade, with 5 theatrical features as well as 34 television films and episodes of TV series, including four additional installments of The F.B.I., a series which had already featured him in two 1960s episodes.

Fifty years old in 1982, Robinson had eleven screen credits in the 1980s, ten of which were in television films as well as episodes of TV series, with the last two airing in 1986 (February 5 episode of CBS' The Equalizer and June 6 episode of ABC's Comedy Factory, June 6). The eleventh role was in his sole theatrical feature of the decade, 1987's Death Wish 4: The Crackdown in which he played the small part of an unnamed newspaper editor. After a passage of nine years performing in local theater and other activity, he returned to the screen in 1996, at age 64, for one small final role, that of an unnamed lawyer for Matthew Broderick's character in the black comedy The Cable Guy, where he was billed 44th in the end credits as Charles Knox Robinson, III.

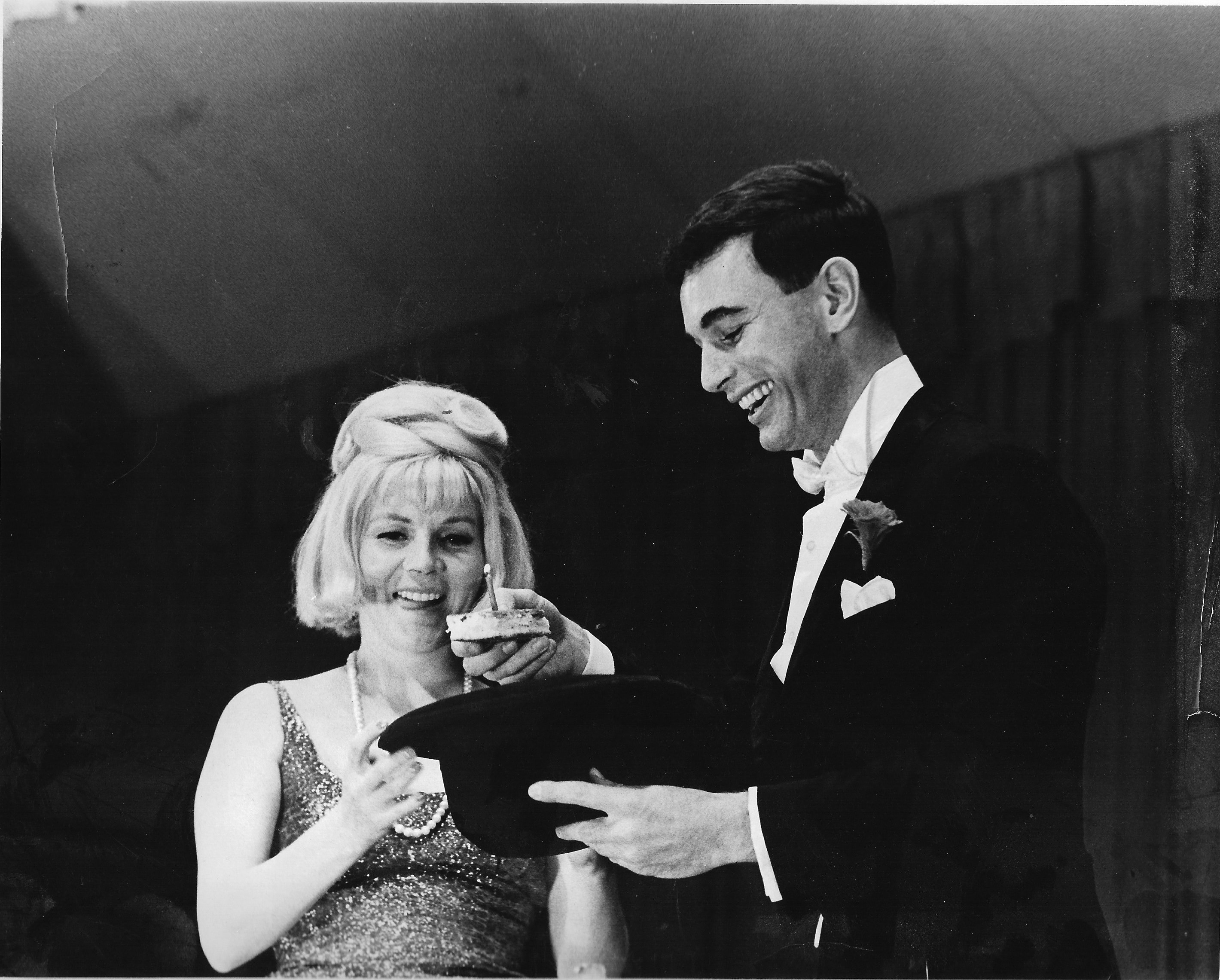
Charles Robinson demonstrating his skill as a magician, with the assistance of his wife Joan, at a late 1960s–early 1970s fundraiser.

He appeared in the 2001 Palm Canyon Theatre Productions Arsenic and Old Lace and The Man Who Came to Dinner. His lifelong entertainment career included his talents as an award-winning playwright, singer, songwriter, musician, linguist and magician. He and his wife, Joan, established the Torchlight Project, which had as its purpose aiding, empowering, and enriching the lives of impoverished and abandoned children in many foreign countries. He was a member of the Academy of Motion Picture Arts and Sciences, Screen Actors Guild, American Federation of Television and Radio Artists, Actors' Equity Association, Playwrights/Dramatists Guild and the Academy of Magical Arts.

== Death ==
Robinson died of Parkinson's disease at his Palm Springs home at the age of 74.

== Filmography ==
=== Film ===
Charles Knox Robinson film credits
Year	Title	Role	Notes
1961	Splendor in the Grass	Johnny Masterson	Uncredited
1962	The Interns	Dr. Dave Simon	
1963	Take Her, She's Mine	Stanley	
1965	Dear Brigitte	George	
1965	Shenandoah	Nathan Anderson	
1965	The Singing Nun	Marauder	
1966	The Sand Pebbles	Ensign Bordelles	
1968	For Singles Only	Jim Allen	
1968	A Time to Sing	Shifty Barker	Uncredited
1970	Triangle	Todd Pearson	
1971	The Bridge in the Jungle	Gales	
1971	The Brotherhood of Satan	Priest	
1973	The Daring Dobermans	Steve Crandall	
1974	So Evil, My Sister	Jerry	
1987	Death Wish 4: The Crackdown	Editor	
1996	The Cable Guy	Steven's Lawyer	(final film role)

=== Television ===
Charles Knox Robinson television credits
Year	Title	Role	Notes
1961	Bachelor Father	Steve	1 episode
1961	77 Sunset Strip	Drake Evans	1 episode
1962	Alfred Hitchcock Presents	Jerry Lane	Episode: "Bad Actor" (S7.E14)
1961–1962	Laramie	Bud Williams / Same Moore	2 episodes
1963	Stoney Burke	Dennis Mitchner	1 episode
1963	Wagon Train	Antone Rose	1 episode
1963	Ripcord	Gregor Korvich	1 episode
1964	Ben Casey	Edward Bullard	1 episode
1965	The Munsters	Alan Benson	1 episode
1965–1973	The F.B.I.	(various)	6 episodes
1967	Gunsmoke	Amos Cole	Episode: "The Prodigal" (S13.E13)
1968	The High Chaparral	Warren Bates	1 episode
1968	Mannix	Harvey Roanhorse	1 episode
1968	My Three Sons	Craig Benson / Mr. Muller	2 episodes
1970	The Virginian	John Woods (Sitkonga)	1 episode
1971	Adam-12	Albert Cook / Mark Donin	2 episodes
1971	Cade's County	Dick Haskell	1 episode
1971	Ironside	Bernie Simmons	1 episode
1972	O'Hara, U.S. Treasury	Agent	1 episode
1972	Banacek	Arthur Patric McKinney	1 episode
1972	The Sixth Sense	Mike Martin	1 episode
1973	The Six Million Dollar Man	Prisoner	TV movie
1973	Barnaby Jones	Gene Merrick	1 episode
1973	Griff	Neil Davis	1 episode
1974	The Manhunter	Tony	1 episode
1974–1976	Emergency!	Alan Benedict / Jack Michaels / Mike Larson	3 episodes
1975	Ellery Queen	Lewis Halliday	1 episode
1975	Mobile One		1 episode
1976	Cannon	Ernie Buckingham	1 episode
1977	The Hardy Boys/Nancy Drew Mysteries	Jim Roper	1 episode
1977	Switch	Tom Harris	1 episode
1979	Flying High	Anatoli	1 episode
1982	Simon & Simon	Anthony Ross	1 episode
1983	Quincy, M.E.	Peter Lassiter	1 episode
1983	The Paper Chase		1 episode
1984	Airwolf	Carl Zimmer	1 episode
1985	Finder of Lost Loves	Salesman	1 episode
1985	Scarecrow & Mrs. King	James McNeil	1 episode
1986	The Equalizer	Brian	Episode: "Torn" (S1.E17)
