= Cheering Section =

1977 comedy film

- Directed by: Harry Kerwin
- Written by: Wayne Crawford; Harry Kerwin
- Produced by: Wayne Crawford
- Starring: Rhonda Fox
- Cinematography: William Walsh
- Edited by: Charles Carrubba; Jane McCulley
- Music by: Jeff Laine
- Production company: American General Pictures
- Distributed by: Dimension Pictures
- Release date: 1977
- Country: United States
- Language: English

Cheering Section is a 1977 American comedy film co-written and directed by Harry Kerwin.

== Premise ==
A high school football star tries to romance a girl at the school. She happens to be the daughter of his coach.

== Cast ==
- Rhonda Fox as Melanie Jackson
- Tom Leindecker as Corey Pearson
- Patricia Michelle as Terry
- Kim Jack as Helen
- Greg D'Jah as Jeff
- Jeff Laine as Sam
- Karyn Wagner as Jill Talbot
- Lance Kerwin as Bob
- Robin Lewis as Locker Girl #1
- Leslie Charleson as Locker Girl #2
- Wayne Crawford as Mr. Stephano
