= Wendell James Franklin =

African-American film executive (1916–1994)

- Born: November 13, 1916; Los Angeles, California, U.S.
- Died: July 22, 1994 (aged 77); Los Angeles, California, U.S.
- Occupations: Film director, television director, executive, producer, stage manager

Wendell James Franklin (1916 – July 22, 1994) was an American film executive, who was the first Black member of the Directors Guild of America starting in 1960. He held several job roles in his career including film and television series director, assistant director, producer, and as a stage manager for live television series.

== Career ==
As a young man, Franklin studied acting with Laura Bowman and performed in the theatre with the Lafayette Players. In his early career he was the parking lot attendant for a film studio, followed by work as a stage manager for television series such as The Jerry Lewis Show, The Nat King Cole Show, This is Your Life, and Queen for a Day. He served as an assistant director to over forty three Hollywood films and television series, including Funny Girl (1968), The Greatest Story Ever Told (1965), and The Bill Cosby Show (from 1969 to 1971). In 1971, Franklin directed the Blaxploitation genre film, Ghetto Revenge (1971).

== Filmography ==
- Ghetto Revenge (1971), also known as The Bus Is Coming, as film director

== See also ==
- Living Between Two Worlds, 1963 film
