= Sweet Sugar (film) =

- Directed by: Michel Levesque
- Screenplay by: Don Spencer
- Story by: R.Z. Samuel
- Produced by: Charles S. Swartz
- Starring: Phyllis Davis
- Cinematography: Gabriel Torres
- Edited by: Ken Robinson; Barry Simon
- Music by: Don Gere
- Distributed by: Dimension Pictures
- Release date: June 9, 1972
- Running time: 90 minutes
- Country: United States
- Language: English

Sweet Sugar is a 1972 American women in prison exploitation film directed by Michel Levesque and starring Phyllis Davis. It is about a woman sentenced to work on a chain gang.

== Plot ==
Sugar Bowman agrees to serve two years working on a sugar-cane plantation rather than go to jail on a trumped-up drug charge. She arrives with new inmate Simone and encounters brutal guard Burgos and a maniacal plantation owner known only as Dr. John.

Along with using a machete in the field to cut cane sugar all day, Sugar and the other inmates are forced to undergo Dr. John's medical experiments, who is testing drugs. He also rapes the 17-year-old prisoner, Dolores. After being caught in an intimate situation with Carlos, a guard, Sugar is to be whipped, but when Carlos refuses, he is shot by Burgos.

The female inmates attempt to hide and protect Mojo, Simone's love interest who has vague voodoo powers, but the Burgos catches him and Dr. John burns him at the stake. After setting fire to the sugar cane fields and stealing guns and vehicles, Sugar, Simone, and Dolores team-up with two more guards to take Dr. John hostage and attempt to escape. While fleeing, Simone is shot and crashes her jeep with Dr. John. He maniacally claims to be immortal, to which she responds by shooting him and blowing up the jeep, killing them both and blocking the exit so the rest can escape in a truck. After ditching the two guards who helped her, the final shot is Sugar walking down a street in town with two men, apparently making good her escape.

== Cast ==
- Phyllis Davis as "Sugar" Bowman
- Ella Edwards as Simone
- Timothy Brown as "Mojo"
- Pamela Collins as Dolores
- Cliff Osmond as Burgos
- Angus Duncan as Dr. John
- Jackie Giroux as Fara Ramirez
- Darl Severns as Carlos
- Albert Cole as Max
- James Houghton as Rick
- James Whitworth as Mario

== Production ==
Stephanie Rothman, who worked at Dimension at the time, said she had creative input on the film.

== Reception ==
The film was given 1/4 stars by film critic Roger Ebert.

== See also ==
- List of American films of 1972
