= Ed Hansen =

American film director

Edward Hansen (30 January 1937 – 16 December 2005) was an American film writer, director and editor.

Hansen was born in Minnesota. He specialized and mostly directed nudies such as the Kitten Natividad films Takin' It Off, Takin' It All Off, Takin' It Off Out West, Robo C.H.I.C., and The Bikini Carwash Company. He was also the editor of 9½ Weeks and Skeeter. Hansen also produced LPs such as Barbara the Grey Witch.

Hansen died in Antioch, California, of bladder cancer, aged 68.
