= Phyllis Davis =

American actress (1940–2013)

- Phyllis Davis on set of Love, American Style, 1973
- Born: Phyllis Ann Davis; July 17, 1940
- Died: September 27, 2013 (aged 73); Henderson, Nevada, U.S.
- Occupation: Actress
- Years active: 1966–1995

Phyllis Ann Davis (July 17, 1940 – September 27, 2013) was an American actress who appeared primarily on television. She co-starred on the 1978–1981 dramatic detective series Vega$ as Beatrice Travis, office manager and girl Friday for the show's main character, Las Vegas private detective Dan Tanna, played by Robert Urich.

== Early life ==
Phyllis Davis considered Port Arthur, Texas, her hometown. Growing up, Davis and her family lived in her parents’ mortuary business, in their home on the second floor. Davis recalled that when a funeral service was being held, the Davis children had to be very quiet on the second floor. After graduating in 1958 from Nederland High School, Davis attended Lamar University. After working as a secretary and as a flight attendant for Continental Airlines, she moved to Los Angeles in 1965. While in Los Angeles, Davis attended acting classes at the Pasadena Playhouse.

== Career ==
Davis's feature films include The Big Bounce (1969), Russ Meyer's Beyond the Valley of the Dolls (1970), Sweet Sugar (1972), Terminal Island (1973), The Day of the Dolphin (1973), The Choirboys (1977), The Wild Women of Chastity Gulch (1982), and Guns (1990). And, in 1975, she played Scarlett O'Hara, the character originally played by Vivien Leigh in the 1939 movie Gone With the Wind, in Train Ride to Hollywood, a pop musical starring the R&B band Bloodstone. Davis explained that the movie was "all a dream sequence," as the storyline involves Bloodstone singer Harry Williams losing consciousness from a head injury and dreaming that he and his bandmates are on a train bound for Los Angeles with famous actors and characters from Old Hollywood's Golden Age. "I played Scarlett O'Hara and had a ball," Davis remembered.

Davis appeared in guest roles on the prime-time series Love, American Style (1969) for five seasons. She also appeared in television series such as Knight Rider, in which she played the villainous Tanya Walker in the pilot, "Knight of the Phoenix". Davis also had guest roles in Magnum, P.I., The Love Boat, Fantasy Island, and The Wild Wild West. She was in an episode of Adam-12 titled "You Blew It" in 1969. She was also a Match Game panelist on occasion and, during her tenure on ABC's Vega$, appeared on a Battle of the Network Stars special.

Davis was probably best known as a co-star on the ABC prime-time series Vega$ from 1978 to 1981, alongside series star Robert Urich. Davis appeared in all 69 episodes. Davis's character, Beatrice Travis, worked for Dan Tanna, the Las Vegas-based private investigator played by Urich. Her role was working as Tanna's very smart secretary and girl Friday in the Las Vegas crime drama.
