= Tough (film) =

- Starring: Dion Gossett
- Distributed by: Dimension Pictures
- Release date: June 7, 1974 (Atlanta)
- Country: United States
- Language: English

Tough, also known as Johnny Tough, is a 1974 blaxploitation film about a young teenager who rebels against authority.

The film is a homage to The 400 Blows (1959).

== Cast ==
- Dion Gossett as Johnny Banes
- Christopher Townes as Chris
- Renny Roker as Phil Banes
- Rich Holmes as Mr. Bishop
- Sandy Reed as Denise Banes
- Loretta King as Teacher (credited as Loretta Hadler)
- Philip Hadler as David
- Detra Piernas as Bonnie
- Mary Bailey
- Shawn Bailey

== Reception ==
A. H. Weiler of The New York Times called the performances from the young actors "natural and convincing," but found that the film "states its intentions honestly but superficially. The emotion generated is rarely equal to the drama's good intentions." Gene Siskel of the Chicago Tribune gave the film zero stars out of four, calling it a "shameful mess" that blended "a simplistic plea for adults to understand that their behavior influences children" with "a nasty collection of juvenile thrill scenes." Kevin Thomas of the Los Angeles Times was positive and called the film "very poignant. As infuriating as its people can be, they are always recognizably human. Above all, the film goes right to the heart of the matter. [Horace] Jackson gets splendid performances all around and demonstrates a special gift for handling kids."

== See also ==
- List of American films of 1974
