= Tomcats (1977 film) =

- Directed by: Harry E. Kerwin
- Written by: Wayne Crawford; Andrew Lane
- Produced by: Wayne Crawford; Andrew Lane
- Starring: Chris Mulkey; Polly King; Wayne Crawford; William Kerwin
- Cinematography: William Randall
- Music by: R.O. DeCordre
- Distributed by: Dimension Pictures
- Release date: April 1977
- Running time: 83 minutes
- Country: United States
- Language: English

Tomcats is a 1977 American film directed by Harry E. Kerwin and starring Chris Mulkey, Polly King, Wayne Crawford, and William Kerwin. It was also known as Deadbeat, Getting Even and Avenged.

Filmed and set in Miami, Florida, the film details the actions of four amoral and degenerate thugs, named M.J., Johnny, Billy, and Curly, who travel around robbing, gang-raping and murdering young women. When they are arrested but get away with their crimes on a legal technicality, the older brother of one of their victims, a law student named Cullen Garrett, decides to take the law into his own hands by stalking and killing the four thugs one by one.

== Cast ==
- Chris Mulkey as Cullen Garrett
- Polly King as Tracy
- Wayne Crawford as M.J. (credited as Scott Lawrence)
- Daniel Schweitzer as Johnny
- Sam Moree as Curly
- Jim Curry as Billy
- William Kerwin as Detective Tom Garrett (credited as Thomas Dowling)
- Rich DeMott as Ben Garrett
- Alison Schlicter as Wendy Garrett
- Robert Shields as Police Chief Henderson
