= Deliver Us From Evil (1976 film) =

- Directed by: Horace Jackson
- Starring: Juanita Moore
- Distributed by: Dimension Pictures
- Release date: 1976
- Country: United States
- Language: English

Deliver Us From Evil is a 1976 American film directed by Horace Jackson.
