= List of horror films of 1982 =

A list of horror films released in 1982.

Title	Director(s)	Cast	Country	Notes	Ref.
The Aftermath	Steve Barkett	Sid Haig	United States	Alternative title(s): Zombie Aftermath	
Alone in the Dark	Jack Sholder	Jack Palance, Donald Pleasence, Martin Landau	United States		
Amityville II: The Possession	Damiano Damiani	James Olson, Burt Young, Rutanya Alda	United States; Mexico	Prequel to first film	
The Appointment	Lindsey C. Vickers	Edward Woodward, Jane Merrow	United Kingdom		
Bakterion	Tonino Ricci	David Warbeck, Janet Agren, José María Labernié	Italy; Spain		
Basket Case	Frank Henenlotter	Kevin Van Hentenryck, Terri Susan Smith, Beverly Bonner	United States	First enty in Basket Case series	
The Beast Within	Philippe Mora	Ronny Cox, Bibi Besch	United States		
Blood Song	Robert Angus, Alan J. Levi	Frankie Avalon, Donna Wilkes, Dane Clark	United States	Alternative title(s): Dream Slayer	
Blood Tide	Richard Jefferies	James Earl Jones, José Ferrer, Lila Kedrova	United States	Alternative title(s): Bloodtide; Demon Island; The Red Tide	
Bloodbeat	Fabrice-Ange Zaphiratos	Helen Benton, Terry Brown	United States; France		
Boardinghouse	John Wintergate	Kalassu, Alexandra Day	United States		
The Boogeyman	Jeffrey C. Schiro	Bert Linder, Mindy Silverman, Bobby Persicelli	United States		
Cat People	Paul Schrader	Nastassja Kinski, Malcolm McDowell, John Heard	United States		
The Clairvoyant	Armand Mastroianni	Perry King, Elizabeth Kemp	United States	Alternative title(s): The Killing Hour	
Creepshow	George A. Romero	Hal Holbrook, Adrienne Barbeau, Fritz Weaver	United States		
Cry for the Strangers	Peter Medak	Patrick Duffy, Cindy Pickett	United States	Television film	
Curse of the Cannibal Confederates	Tony Malanowski	Rebecca Bach, Christopher Gummer	United States		
Dark Sanity	Martin Green	Aldo Ray, Kory Clark, Chuck Jamison	United States	Alternative title(s): Straight Jacket	
Deadly Games	Scott Mansfield	Jo Ann Harris, Steve Railsback, June Lockhart	United States	Alternative title(s): Who Fell Asleep?	
Death Screams	David Nelson	Susan Kiger, Jennifer Chase, Andria Savio	United States	Alternative title(s): House of Death	
Death Valley	Dick Richards	Paul Le Mat, Catherine Hicks, Stephen McHattie	United States		
Dogs of Hell	Worth Keeter	Earl Owensby, Bill Gribble	United States		
Don't Go to Sleep	Richard Lang	Dennis Weaver, Valerie Harper, Ruth Gordon	United States	Television film	
Don't Look in the Attic	Carlo Ausino	Beba Lončar, Jean-Pierre Aumont, Annarita Grapputo	Italy	Alternative title(s): House of the Cursed Spirits; House of the Damned	
The Dorm That Dripped Blood	Stephen W. Carpenter, Jeffrey Obrow	Laurie Lapinski, Stephen Sachs, Daphne Zuniga	United States		
The Entity	Sidney J. Furie	Barbara Hershey	United States		
Fantasies	William Wiard	Suzanne Pleshette, Barry Newman, Robert Vaughn	United States	Television film	
Forbidden World	Allan Holzman	Jesse Vint, Scott Paulin, Michael Bowen	United States		
The Forest	Don Jones	Gary Kent, Tomi Barrett, John Batis	United States		
Friday the 13th Part III	Steve Miner	Dana Kimmell, Paul Kratka, Richard Brooker	United States	Third film of Friday the 13th franchise	
The Ghost Dance	Peter F. Buffa	Julie Amato, Victor Mohica, Frank Salsedo	United States		
Girls Nite Out	Robert Deubel	Julia Montgomery, Hal Holbrook, Rutanya Alda	United States	Alternative title(s): The Scaremaker	
Halloween III: Season of the Witch	Tommy Lee Wallace	Tom Atkins, Stacey Nelkin, Dan O'Herlihy	United States	Third film of Halloween franchise without Michael Myers	
Honeymoon Horror	Harry Preston	Paul Iwanski	United States		
Hotline	Jerry Jameson	Lynda Carter, Steve Forrest	United States	Television film	
Hospital Massacre	Boaz Davidson	Barbi Benton	United States	Alternative title(s): X-Ray	
The House in the Woods	Butch Perez	Vilma Santos, Christopher De Leon, Rio Locsin	Philippines		
The House on Sorority Row	Mark Rosman	Kathryn McNeil, Eileen Davidson	United States		
The House Where Evil Dwells	Kevin Connor	Edward Albert, Susan George, Doug McClure	United States; Japan		
Humongous	Paul Lynch	Janet Julian, David Wallace, John Wildman	Canada		
The Hunchback of Notre Dame	Michael Tuchner, Alan Hume	Anthony Hopkins, Derek Jacobi, Lesley-Anne Down, John Gielgud	United States		
The Incubus	John Hough	John Cassavetes, Kerrie Keane, Helen Hughes	Canada		
Invitation to Hell	Michael J. Murphy	Becky Simpson, Joseph Sheahan	United Kingdom		
Jaws of Satan	Bob Claver	Fritz Weaver, Jon Korkes, Gretchen Corbett	United States		
The Last Horror Film	David Winters	Caroline Munro, Joe Spinell, Judd Hamilton	United States		
The Living Dead Girl	Jean Rollin	Marina Pierro, Françoise Blanchard, Carina Barone	France		
Madman	Joe Giannone	Gaylen Ross	United States		
Manhattan Baby	Lucio Fulci	Christopher Connelly	Italy		
Midnight	John A. Russo	Lawrence Tierney, Melanie Verlin, John Hall	United States		
Murder by Phone	Michael Anderson	Richard Chamberlain, John Houseman, Sara Botsford	United States; Canada	Alternative title(s): Bells; The Calling	
The New York Ripper	Lucio Fulci	Babette New, Jack Hedley, Zora Kerova	Italy		
Next of Kin	Tony Williams	Jacki Kerin, John Jarratt, Alex Scott	Australia	Alternative title(s): Hell House	
Parasite	Charles Band	Robert Glaudini, Demi Moore	United States		
Pieces	Juan Piquer Simón	Christopher George, Lynda Day George	Spain; United States	Alternative title(s): One Thousand Cries Has the Night	
Poltergeist	Tobe Hooper	Craig T. Nelson, JoBeth Williams, Beatrice Straight	United States	First film of Poltergeist franchise	
Q	Larry Cohen	Michael Moriarty, Candy Clark, David Carradine	United States		
Satan's Mistress	James Polakof	Britt Ekland, Lana Wood	United States		
The Sender	Roger Christian	Kathryn Harrold, Željko Ivanek, Shirley Knight	United Kingdom		
The Slayer	J. S. Cardone	Sarah Kendall, Frederick Flynn, Carol Kottenbrook	United States		
The Slumber Party Massacre	Amy Holden Jones	Robin Stille	United States		
A Stranger Is Watching	Sean S. Cunningham	Kate Mulgrew, Rip Torn, James Naughton	United States		
Superstition	James W. Roberson	James Houghton, Albert Salmi	United States		
Tenebrae	Dario Argento	Anthony Franciosa, John Saxon, Daria Nicolodi	Italy	Alternative title(s): Unsane	
The Thing	John Carpenter	Kurt Russell, Keith David, Wilford Brimley	United States		
Trick or Treats	Gary Graver	Carrie Snodgress, Peter Jason, David Carradine	United States		
Unhinged	Don Gronquist	Laurel Munson, Janet Penner, Sara Ansley	United States		
Variola Vera	Goran Marković	Rade Šerbedžija, Erland Josephson, Rade Marković	Yugoslavia		
Visiting Hours	Jean-Claude Lord	Michael Ironside, Lee Grant, Linda Purl	Canada	Alternative title(s): Get Well Soon; Terreur à l'hôpital central; The Fright	
Xtro	Harry Bromley Davenport	Bernice Stegers, Philip Sayer, Simon Nash	United Kingdom		

== Sources ==
- Albright, Brian (2008). Wild Beyond Belief!: Interviews with Exploitation Filmmakers of the 1960s and 1970s. Jefferson, North Carolina: McFarland. ISBN 978-0-786-48250-4.
- Albright, Brian (2012). Regional Horror Films, 1958-1990: A State-by-State Guide with Interviews. Jefferson, North Carolina: McFarland. ISBN 978-1-476-60042-0.
- Chibnall, Steve; Petley, Julian, eds. (2002). British Horror Cinema. New York City, New York: Routledge. ISBN 978-0-415-23003-2.
- Hardy, Phil, ed. (1995). The Overlook Film Encyclopedia. Vol. 3. Overlook Press. ISBN 0-87951-624-0.
- Harper, Jim (2004). Legacy of Blood: A Comprehensive Guide to Slasher Movies. Manchester, England: Critical Vision. ISBN 978-1-900-48639-2.
- Heller-Nicholas, Alexandra (2011). Rape-Revenge Films: A Critical Study. McFarland. ISBN 978-0-7864-4961-3.
- Kay, Glenn (2012). Zombie Movies: The Ultimate Guide (2nd ed.). Chicago, Illinois: Chicago Review Press. ISBN 978-1-613-74425-3.
- Kerekes, David; Slater, David (2005). See No Evil: Banned Films and Video Controversy. London, England: Headpress. ISBN 978-1-900-48610-1.
- Muir, John Kenneth (2010). Horror Films of the 1980s. Jefferson, North Carolina: McFarland. ISBN 978-0-786-45501-0.
- Muir, John Kenneth (2011). Horror Films of the 1990s. Jefferson, North Carolina: McFarland. ISBN 978-0-786-48480-5.
- Pitts, Michael R. (2013). Western Movies: A Guide to 5,105 Feature Films (2nd ed.). Jefferson, North Carolina: McFarland. ISBN 978-0-786-46372-5.
- Pratley, Gerald (2003). A Century of Canadian Cinema: Gerald Pratley's Feature Film Guide, 1900 to the Present. Toronto, Ontario: Lynx Images. ISBN 978-1-894-07321-9.
- Rockoff, Adam (2016) [2002]. Going to Pieces: The Rise and Fall of the Slasher Film, 1978–1986. Jefferson, North Carolina: McFarland. ISBN 978-0-786-49192-6.
- Shelley, Peter (2012). Australian Horror Films, 1973-2010. Jefferson, North Carolina: McFarland. ISBN 978-0-786-46167-7.
- Stine, Scott Aaron (2003). The Gorehound's Guide to Splatter Films of the 1980s. Jefferson, North Carolina: McFarland. ISBN 978-0-786-41532-8.
- Waller, Gregory Albert, ed. (1987). American Horrors: Essays on the Modern American Horror Film. Urbana, Illinois: University of Illinois Press. ISBN 978-0-252-01448-2.
- Young, R. G. (2000). The Encyclopedia of Fantastic Film: Ali Baba to Zombies. Hal Leonard Corporation. ISBN 1-55783-269-2.
