= Angels Revenge =

1979 film

- One-sheet for Angels Brigade
- Directed by: Greydon Clark
- Written by: Greydon Clark; Alvin L. Fast
- Produced by: Greydon Clark
- Starring: Sylvia Anderson; Lieu Chinh; Jacqueline Cole; Liza Greer; Robin Greer; Susan Kiger; Peter Lawford; Jack Palance; Jim Backus
- Cinematography: Dean Cundey
- Music by: Gerald Lee
- Distributed by: Arista Films
- Release date: February 1979
- Running time: 97 minutes
- Country: United States
- Language: English

Angels Revenge, or Angels Brigade, is a 1979 American action comedy film. It was directed by Greydon Clark and distributed by Arista Films. The film is also known as Angels' Brigade and Seven from Heaven.

The film has major roles for Peter Lawford and Jack Palance as the leaders of a drug cartel, and gives minor roles to character actors Jim Backus, Alan Hale Jr., Pat Buttram, and Arthur Godfrey (playing himself). Of the actresses who played the film's seven female protagonists, however, the closest any had previously come to any degree of fame was Susan Kiger, who had been the Playboy Playmate of the Month for January 1977. Kiger played singer Michelle Wilson; her co-stars were Sylvia Anderson as stuntwoman Terry Grant, Lieu Chinh as martial arts instructor Keiko Umaro, Jacqueline Cole as high-school teacher April, Noela Velasco as model Maria, and Robin Greer as policewoman Elaine Brenner. Her younger sister Liza Greer plays high-school student Trish, who invites herself into the team. Jack Palance played chief antagonist Mike Farrell, assistant to Lawford's kingpin character.

The film's plot focuses on seven female vigilantes who decide to undermine the operation of a drug cartel. The titular "revenge" is a reference to one of the vigilantes being primarily motivated by her desire to avenge her hospitalized brother, a drug user.

== Plot ==
The film focuses on seven women who decide to fight the local drug cartel after the brother of Michelle Wilson, a Las Vegas pop singer, is found severely beaten. When taken to the hospital, the young man is discovered to have been using illegal drugs. The singer meets with April, her brother's teacher, and the two hatch a plan to destroy the local drug processing plant.

They recruit four more women with special skills and connections to help them achieve their audacious goal. As they plan their first strike, they discover high-schooler Trish spying on them. The student is relegated to phone duty but eventually worms her way into their escapades. The "Angels" not only destroy the processing plant but also manage to intercept one of the shipments. As a result, the women attract unwelcome attention from the local drug cartel.

== Cast ==
- Jacqueline Cole as April Thomas
- Sylvia Anderson (actress) as Terry Grant
- Lieu Chinh as Kako Umaro
- Liza Greer as Trish
- Robin Greer as Elaine Brenner
- Susan Kiger as Michelle Wilson
- Noela Velasco as Maria
- Jack Palance as Mike Farrell
- Peter Lawford as Burke
- Jim Backus as Commander Lindsey March
- Neville Brand as Miller
- Pat Buttram as Van Salesman
- Arthur Godfrey as Himself
- Alan Hale Jr. as Manny
- Darby Hinton as Sticks
- Dee Cooper as Compound thug
- Al Gomez as American Rights Guard
- Candy Castillo as Hitman #1
- Greydon Clark as Movie Director

== Critical response ==
The film was poorly received by both critics and the general public, being seen as a cheap knockoff of Charlie's Angels. The plot was seen as contrived. It also had a number of actors, primarily Lawford and Palance, whose popularity had fallen since the 1960s.

=== Mystery Science Theater 3000 ===
Because of the poor response, the film faded into obscurity until 1995 when it was featured on the movie-mocking television series Mystery Science Theater 3000. It was edited to fit their timeslot; for example, Miller (Neville Brand) is listed in the opening credits, but only mentioned towards the end, never actually appearing on screen.

The episode featuring the film was the final episode broadcast on Comedy Central, when it aired as a rerun on December 30, 1996.

=== RiffTrax ===
In 2017, former MST3K writers and cast members Bridget Nelson and Mary Jo Pehl riffed the uncut film as a video-on-demand for RiffTrax.

== See also ==
- B movie
- Rural purge
