= Cessna 310 =

Twin-engine general aviation aircraft

Cessna 310 / 320
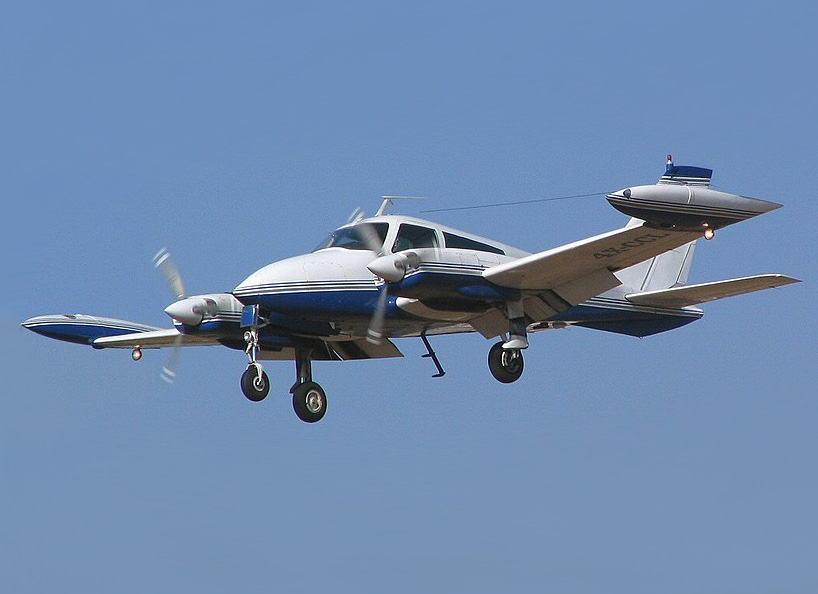
- Cessna 310P

General information
- Type: Twin-engine cabin monoplane
- Manufacturer: Cessna
- Primary user: United States Air Force
- Number built: 5,449 (310); 577 (320)

History
- Manufactured: 1954–1980
- Introduction date: 1954
- First flight: January 3, 1953
- Developed into: Cessna 340; Cessna 411

The Cessna 310 is an American four-to-six-seat, low-wing, twin-engine monoplane produced by Cessna between 1954 and 1980. It was the second twin-engine aircraft that Cessna put into production; the first was the Cessna T-50. It was used by the U.S. military as the L-27, after 1962, U-3. Over six thousand Cessna 310 and 320 aircraft were produced between 1954 and 1980.

== Development ==
The 310 first flew on January 3, 1953, with deliveries starting in late 1954. The sleek modern lines of the new twin were backed up by innovative features such as engine exhaust thrust augmenter tubes and the storage of all fuel in tip tanks in early models. In 1964, the engine exhaust was changed to flow under the wing instead of the augmenter tubes, which were considered to be noisy.

Typical of Cessna model naming conventions, a letter was added after the model number to identify changes to the original design over the years. The first significant upgrade to the 310 series was the 310C in 1959, which introduced more powerful 260 hp (194 kW) Continental IO-470-D engines. In 1960 the 310D featured swept-back vertical tail surfaces. An extra cabin window was added with the 310F.

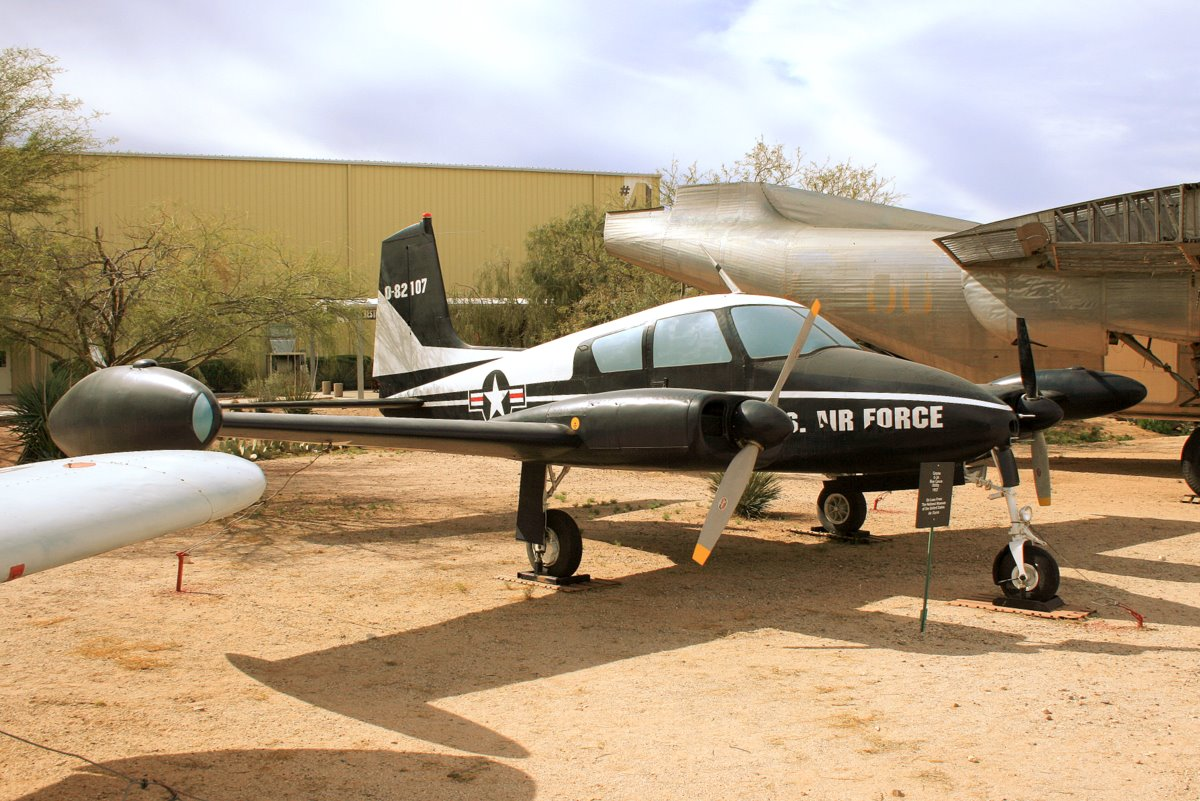
An ex-USAF U-3A on display at the Pima Air & Space Museum in Tucson, Arizona

The turbocharged 320 Skyknight was developed from the 310F. Equipped with TSIO-470-B engines and featuring an extra cabin window on each side, it was in production between 1961 and 1969 (the 320E was named the Executive Skyknight), when it was replaced by the similar Turbo 310.

The 310G was certified in 1961 and introduced the canted wingtip fuel tanks found on the majority of the Cessna twin-engine product line, marketed as "stabila-tip" tanks by Cessna, because they were meant to aid stability in flight. A single side window replaced the rear two windows on the 310K (certified in late 1965), with optional three-blade propellers being introduced as well. Subsequent developments included the 310Q and turbocharged T310Q with a redesigned rear cabin featuring a skylight window, and the final 310R and T310R, identifiable by a lengthened nose containing a baggage compartment. Production ended in 1980.

Over the years there were several modifications to the 310 to improve performance. Aircraft engineer Jack Riley produced two variants, The Riley Rocket 310 and the Riley Turbostream 310. Riley replaced the standard Continental 310 hp (230 kW) engines with 350 hp (261 kW) Lycoming TIO-540 engines. These turbocharged intercooled engines were installed with three-blade Hartzell propellers in a counter-rotating configuration to further increase performance and single-engine safety. At 5,400 lb (2,400 kg) gross weight the aircraft had a weight to power ratio of 7.71 lb (3.50 kg) per horsepower. This resulted in a cruising speed of 260 knots (480 km/h; 300 mph) at 18,000 feet (5,500 m) and a 3,000 ft/min (15 m/s) rate of climb.

== Operational history ==
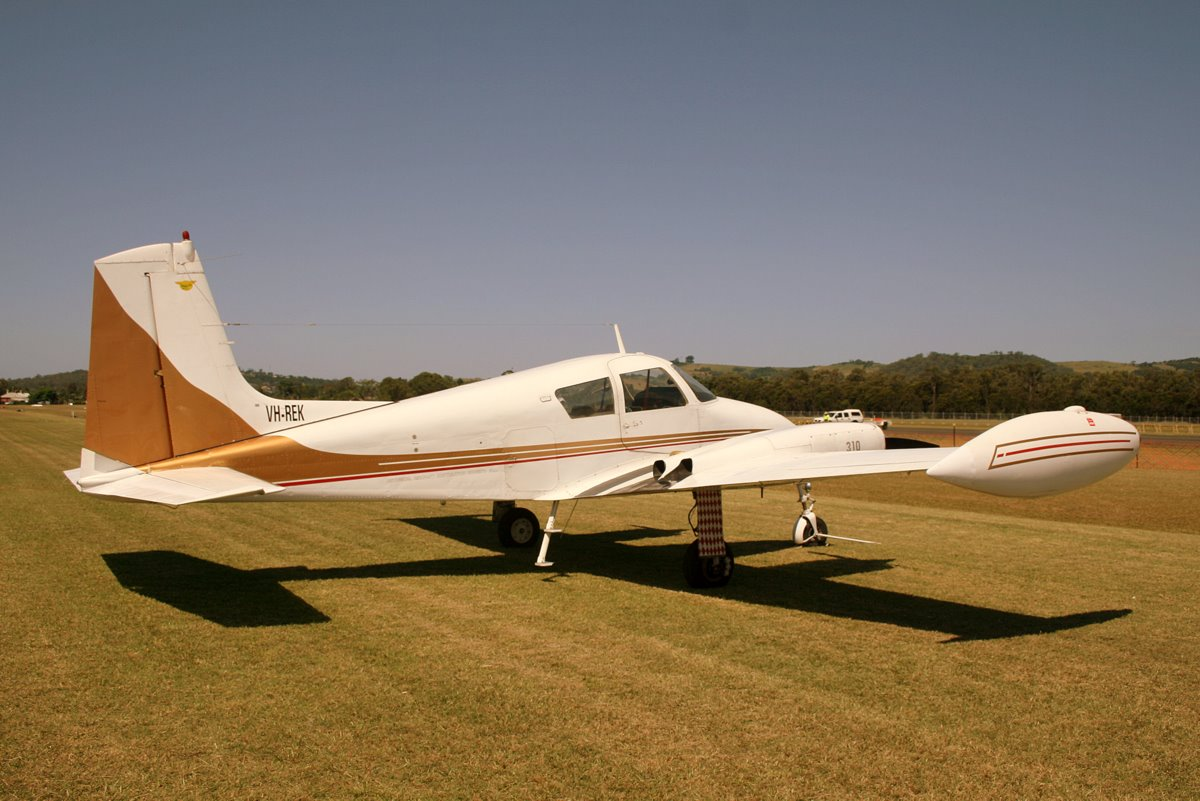
1957 Cessna 310B, with straight fin and overwing 'augmentor tube' exhaust system

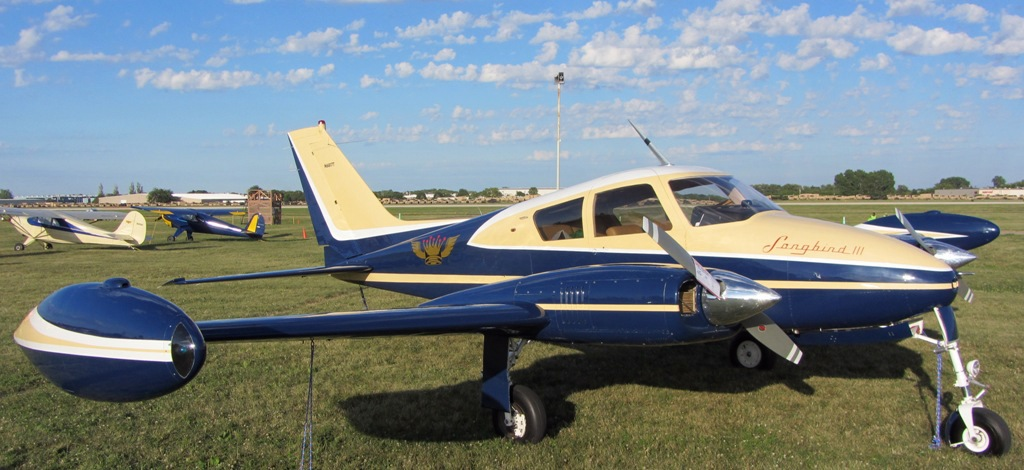
Cessna 310D with early rounded nose, swept-back vertical stabilizer and "tuna" style wingtip fuel tanks

=== Commercial applications ===
The Cessna 310 was a common charter aircraft for the many air taxi firms that sprang up in the general aviation boom that followed World War II. The advantages of the Cessna 310 over its contemporaries, such as the Piper PA-23, were its speed, operating costs and aftermarket modifications, such as the Robertson STOL kits that made it popular worldwide for its bush flying characteristics. It could use short runways, while at the same time carrying a large useful load of 2,000 lb (910 kg). or more, at speeds that were high for a twin engine piston aircraft.

=== Military applications ===
In 1957, the United States Air Force (USAF) selected the Cessna 310 for service as a light utility aircraft for transport and administrative support. The USAF purchased 160 unmodified 310A aircraft with the designation L-27A and unofficially nicknamed Blue Canoe, later changed to U-3A in 1962. An additional 36 upgraded 310 designated L-27B (later U-3B) were delivered in 1960–61; these aircraft were essentially military 310Fs and as such equipped with the more powerful 260 hp (194 kW) engines and can be identified by their extra cabin windows, longer nose and swept vertical fin. A USAF study after one year of operational service found the U-3A had direct operating costs of less than $12 an hour. The U-3 saw active service in a support role when the USAF deployed aircraft to South Vietnam during the Vietnam War, where they were used on courier flights between air bases. Some USAF aircraft were later transferred to the U.S. Army and U.S. Navy and the type continued in United States military service into the mid-1970s.

=== Notable private flights ===
On December 19, 1992, Cuban defector Major Orestes Lorenzo Pérez returned to Cuba in a 1961 Cessna 310 to retrieve his wife and two sons. Flying without lights, at low speed and very low altitude to avoid Cuban radar, Pérez picked up his family by landing on the coastal highway of Varadero beach, Matanzas Province, 93 mi (150 km) east of Havana and managed a successful safe return to Marathon, Florida.

== Variants ==
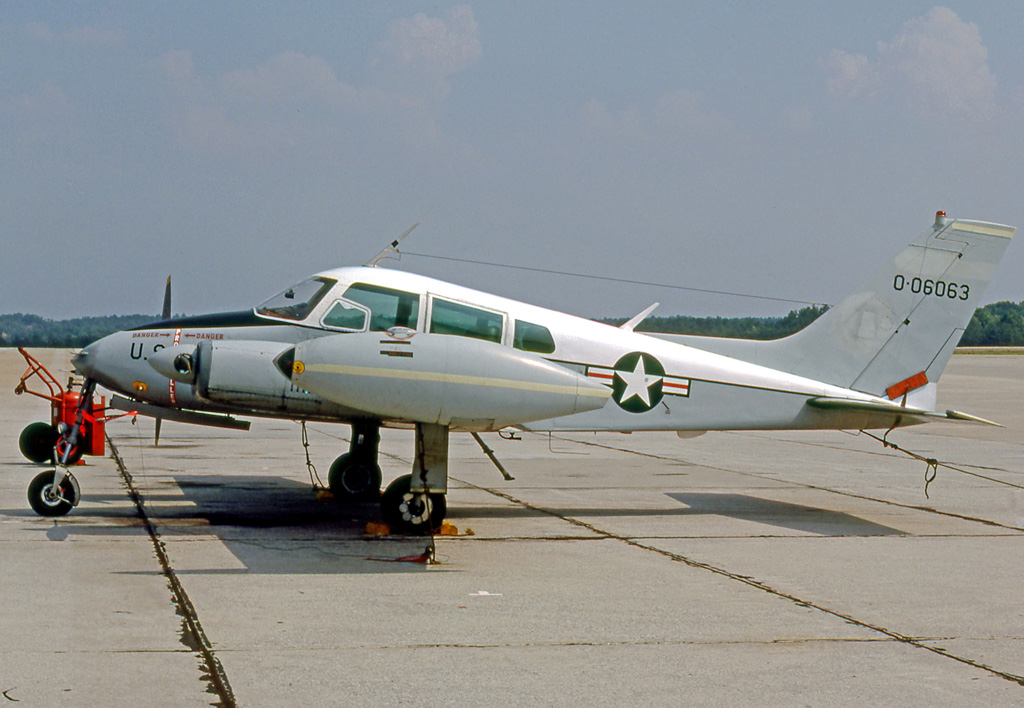
U.S. Army U-3B Blue Canoe utility communications aircraft delivered in 1961

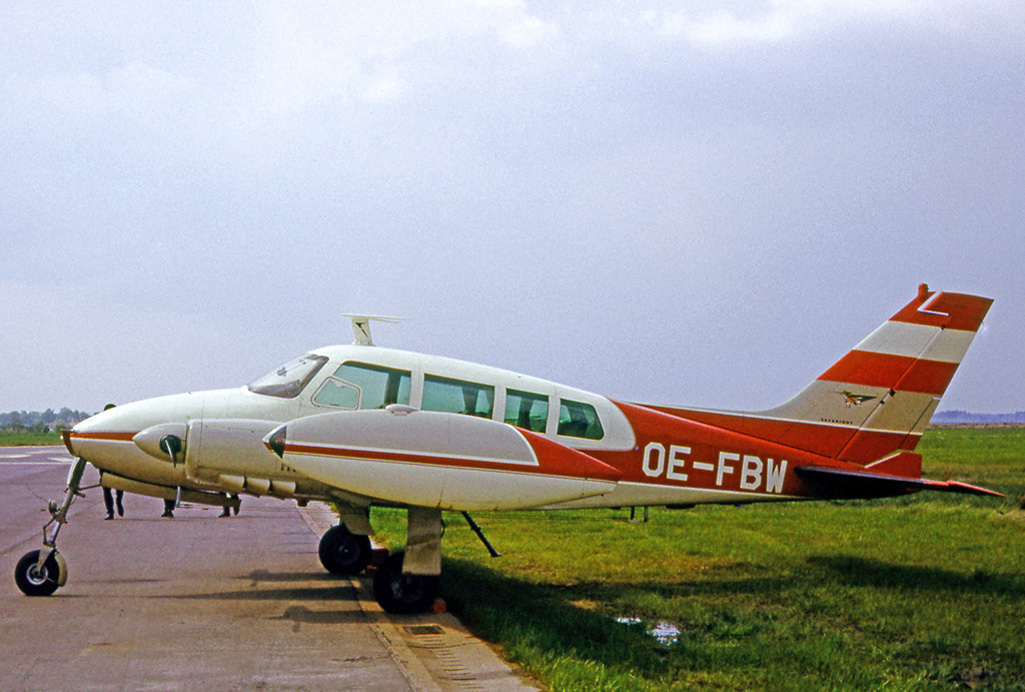
Austrian-registered Cessna 320 Skyknight at the 1966 Hanover Air Show, displaying this variant's fourth side window

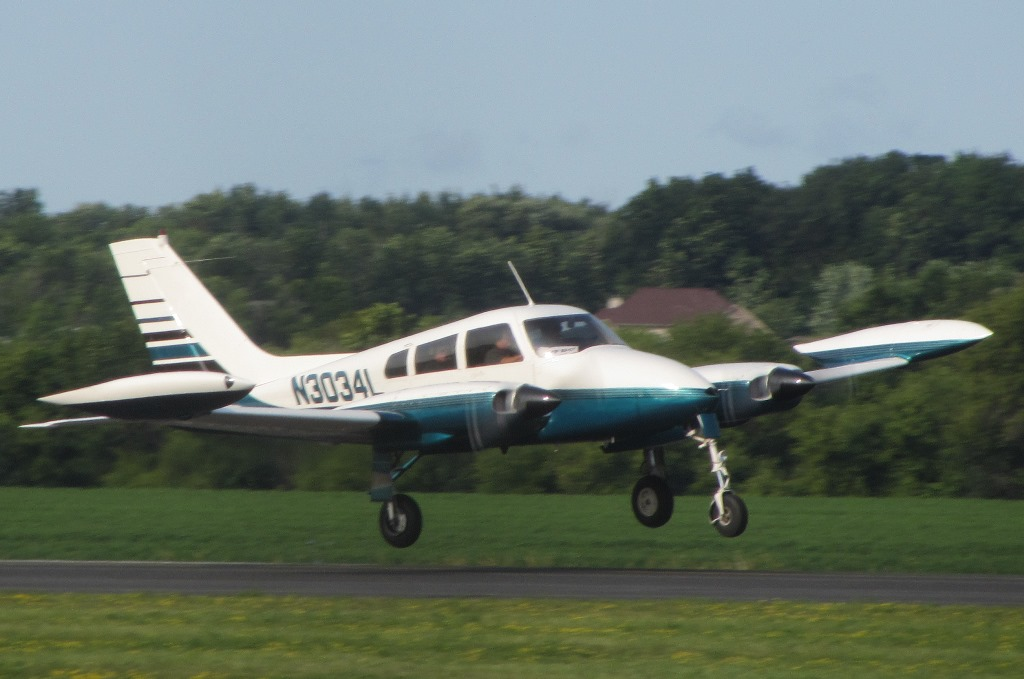
Cessna 310J

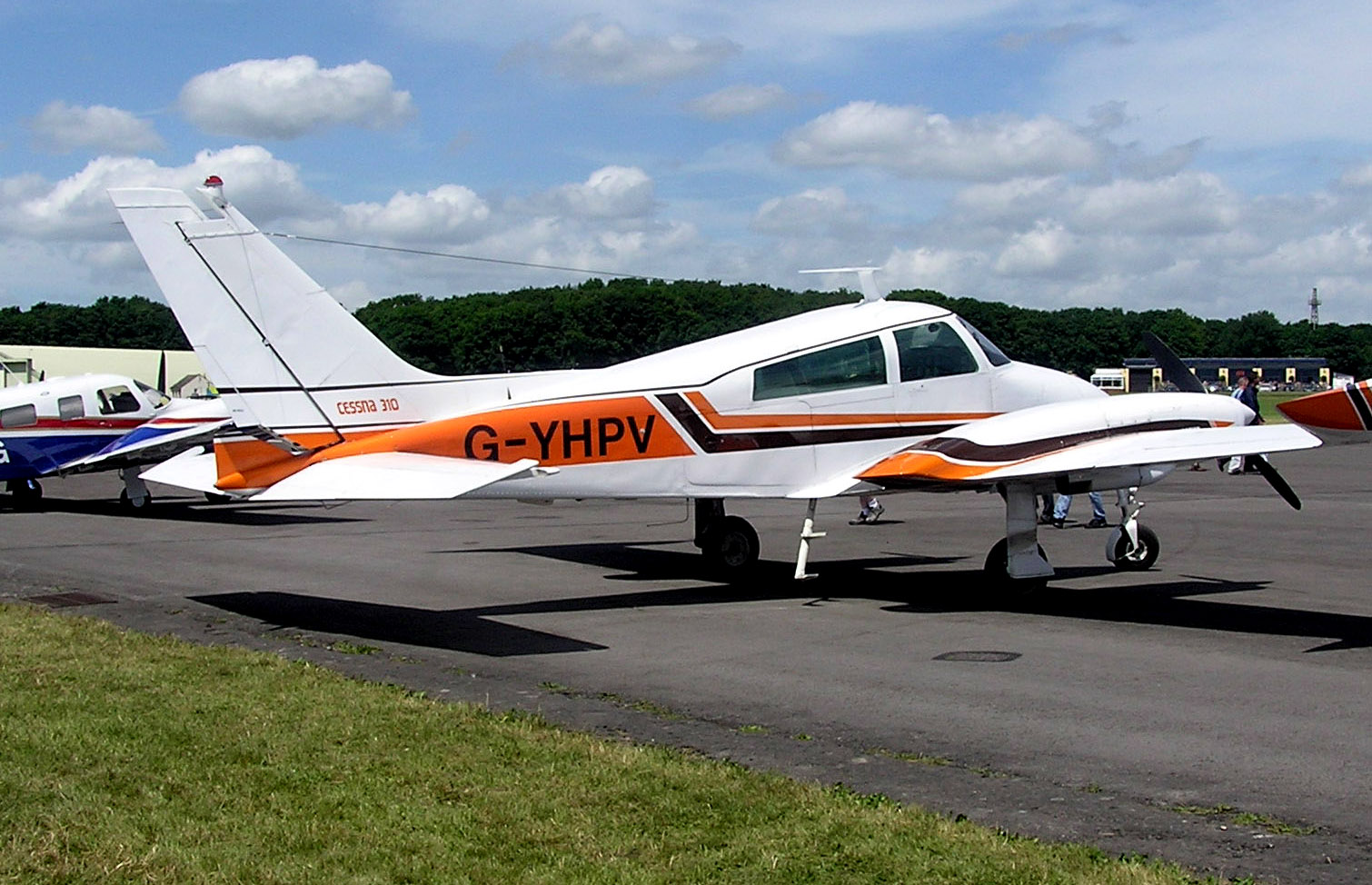
1968 Cessna 310N, with underwing engine exhaust system and showing the engine nacelle baggage compartment introduced with the 310I

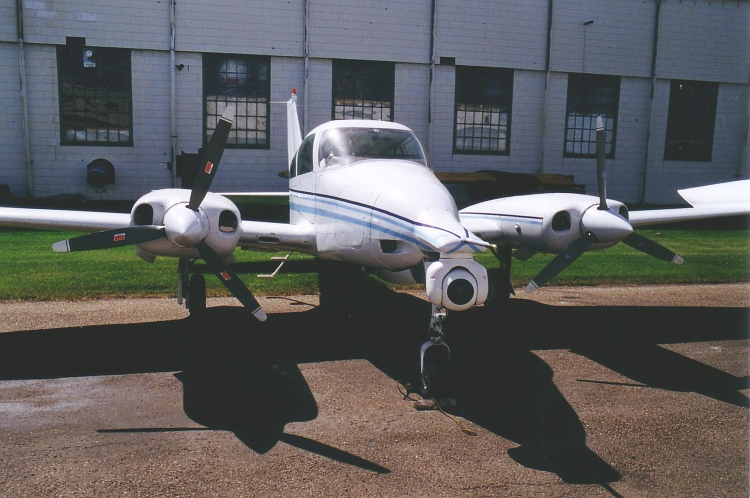
Cessna T310P equipped with a nose-mounted IR detection system for forest fire detection

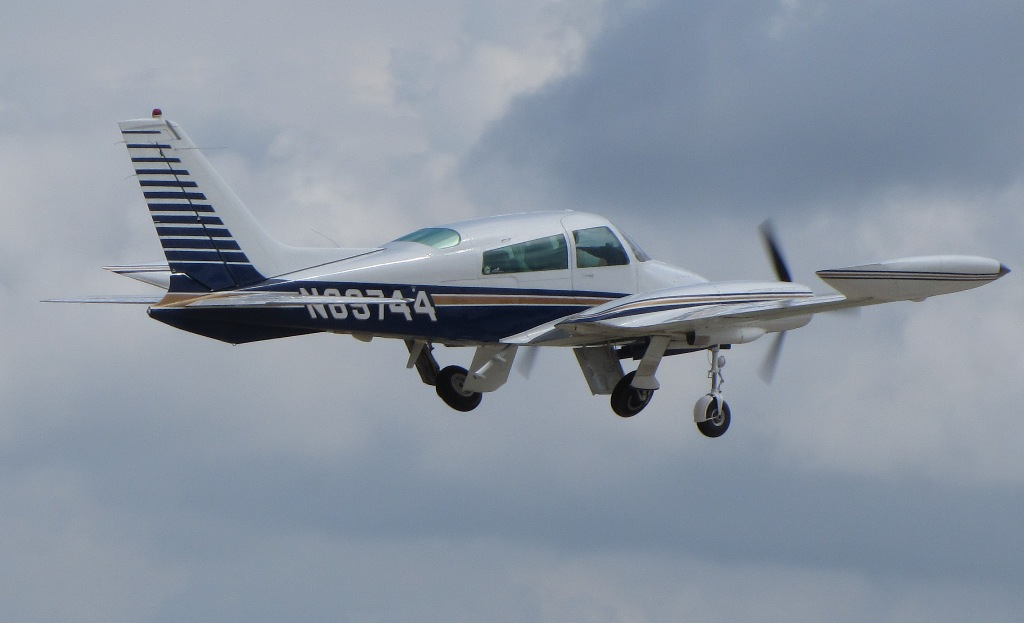
Cessna 310Q with skylight rear window

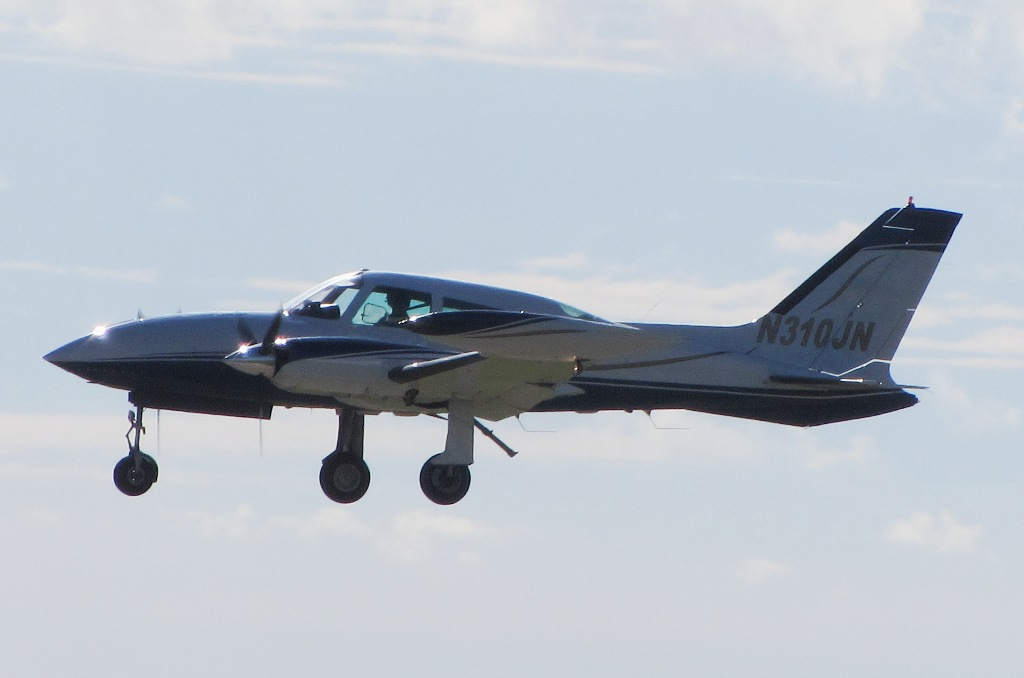
1977 Cessna T310R

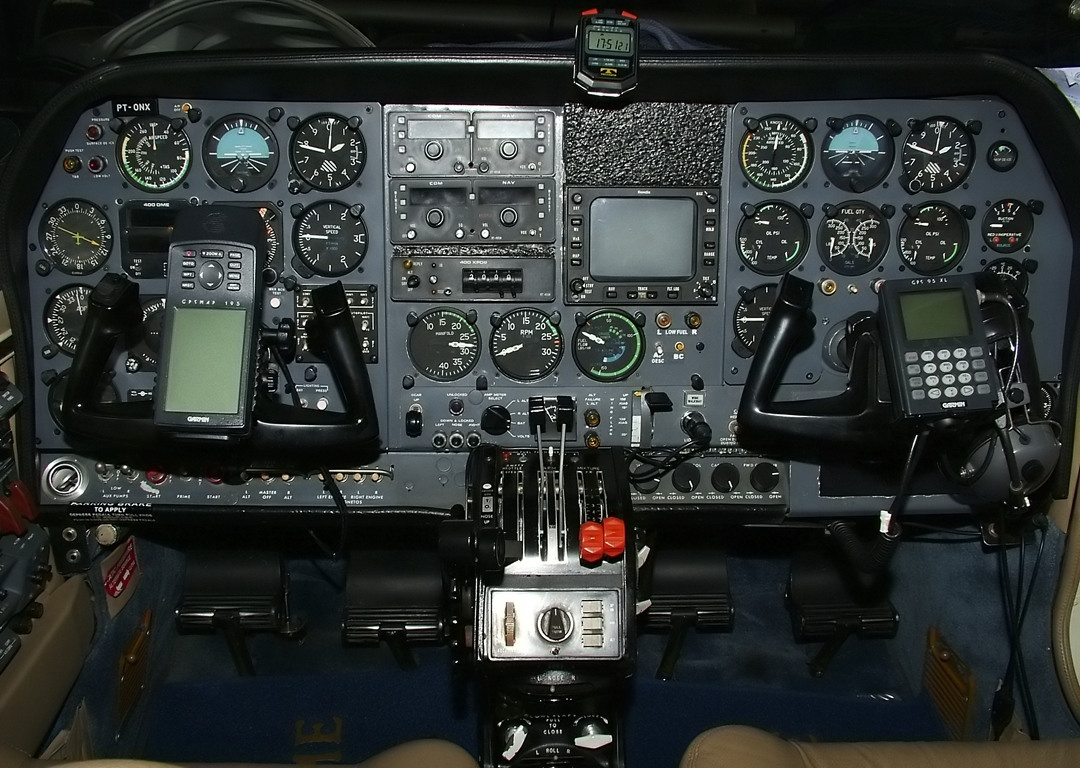
Cessna 310R instrument panel

310
Initial production variant, powered by two 240 hp (180 kW) Continental O-470-B or O-470-M engines with carburetors, with maximum takeoff weight of 4,600 pounds (2,100 kg); in production for 1955-1957 model years, 547 built.
310A
Military version of the 310 for the United States Air Force, designated L-27A and later U-3A; with Continental O-470-M engines and maximum takeoff weight of 4,830 pounds (2,190 kg); 161 built.
310B
Model produced in 1958, with new instrument panel, O-470-M engines and maximum takeoff weight of 4,700 pounds (2,100 kg); 225 built.
310C
Model produced in 1959, with 260 hp (190 kW) Continental IO-470-D fuel-injected engines and maximum takeoff weight increased to 4,830 pounds (2,190 kg); and minor changes; 260 built. Unit cost $59,950 in 1959
310D
First model with swept vertical tail, other minor detail changes; 268 built for 1960 model year.
310E
Military version of the 310F, designated the L-27B and later U-3B; with maximum takeoff weight of 4,990 pounds (2,260 kg); 36 built.
310F
Model produced in 1961, with extra cabin window each side, pointed nose and other minor changes; maximum takeoff weight of 4,830 pounds (2,190 kg); 155 built.
310G
First model with canted slimline tip tanks and optional six-seat cabin, with maximum takeoff weight increased to 4,990 pounds (2,260 kg) and detail changes, 156 built in 1962.
310H
Model produced in 1963 with maximum takeoff weight increased to 5,100 pounds (2,300 kg) and enlarged cabin interior. 148 built.
E310H
Version of 310H with the 4,990-pound (2,260 kg) maximum takeoff weight of the 310G; combined total of 148 310H and E310H built.
310I
First model with baggage compartments in rear of engine nacelles, Continental IO-470-U engines and minor detail changes; 200 built in 1964.
310J
Model produced in 1965 with minor detailed changes and maximum takeoff weight of 5,100 pounds (2,300 kg).
310J-1
Version of 310J type-certified in the Utility Category; with maximum takeoff weight increased to 5,150 pounds (2,340 kg); seating limited to four people instead of the 310J's six; and reduced baggage weight limit.
E310J
Version of 310J with maximum takeoff weight reduced to 4,990 pounds (2,260 kg); combined total of 200 310J, 310J-1 and E310J built.
310K
First model with optional three-blade propellers and long 'vista view' side windows; also increased maximum takeoff weight of 5,200 pounds (2,400 kg) with IO-470-V or IO-470-VO engines; 245 built in 1966.
310L
First model with increased fuel capacity via fuel tanks inside wings and optional fuel tanks in engine nacelles, also single-piece windshield, redesigned landing gear, and minor changes; 207 built in 1967.
310M
Revised designation for the 310E.
310N
Model produced in 1968, with revised instrument panel and provision for optional cargo door and fuel; 198 built.
310P
Model produced in 1969, with Continental IO-470-VO engines, ventral fin and a shorter nose gear leg.
T310P
Version of 310P with turbocharged Continental TSIO-520-B or TSIO-520-BB engines producing 285 hp (213 kW) and maximum takeoff weight of 5,400 pounds (2,400 kg); combined total of 240 310P and T310P built.
310Q
Last short-nose model, introduced in 1970, with maximum takeoff weight increased to 5,300 lb (2,400 kg) and detailed changes, from the 401st aircraft fitted with a bulged rear cabin roof with rear view window.
T310Q
Version of 310Q with turbocharged Continental TSIO-520-B or TSIO-520-BB engines and maximum takeoff weight increased to 5,500 lb (2,500 kg); combined total of 871 310Q and T310Q built.
310R
Last production model, introduced in the 1975 model year, with 285 hp (213 kW) Continental IO-520-M or IO-520-MB engines; three-blade propellers as standard; lengthened nose containing a baggage compartment; and 5,500 lb (2,500 kg) maximum takeoff weight.
T310R
Version of 310R with turbocharged Continental TSIO-520-B or TSIO-520-BB engines; combined total of 1,332 310R and T310R built.
310S
Original designation for the Cessna 320.
320 Skyknight
Enlarged version of the 310F with six seats, larger cabin and two turbocharged engines; 110 built.
320A Skyknight
First model with canted fuel tanks and minor changes; 47 built.
320B Skyknight
First model with nacelle baggage lockers, minor changes; 62 built.
320C Skyknight
Model with a longer cabin, optional seventh seat and minor changes; 73 built.
320D Executive Skyknight
Model with reshaped rear windows and 285 hp (213 kW) TSIO-520-B engines; 130 built.
320E Executive Skyknight
Model with pointed nose, single piece windshield, modified landing gear, increased takeoff weight and minor changes; 110 built.
320F Executive Skyknight
Model with minor changes compared to 320E; 45 built.
L-27A
United States military designation for the 310A, later changed to U-3A.
L-27B
United States military designation for the 310E/310M, later changed to U-3B.
U-3A
L-27A redesignated in 1963.
U-3B
L-27B redesignated in 1963.
Colemill Executive 600
Conversion of models 310F to 310Q, replacing the engines with 350 hp (260 kW) Lycoming TIO-540-J2BDs driving four-bladed propellers.

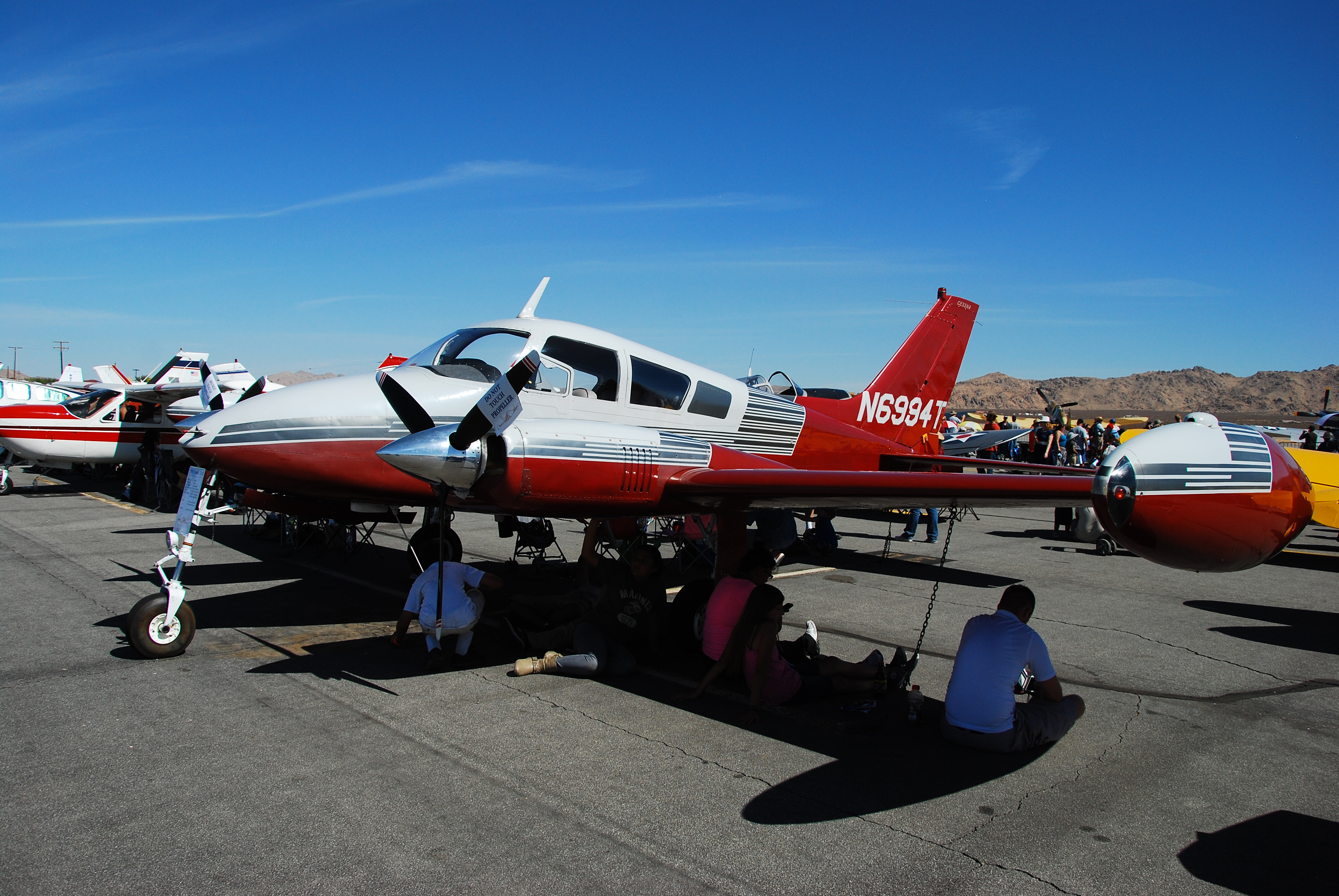
Riley Turbo Rocket version of the Cessna 310D

Riley 65
Conversion offered for models 310 to 310G, replacing the engines with two 240-260 hp (179–194 kW) Continental O-470Ds or -470Ms.
Riley Super 310
Conversion of Cessna 310/320 by fitting two 310 hp (231 kW) Continental TSIO-520J or 520N engines.
Riley Turbostream
Conversion of Cessna 310 by fitting two 350 hp Lycoming engines.
Riley Rocket
Conversion of Cessna 310 by fitting two 290 hp (216 kW) Lycoming IO-540-A1A5 engines and more fuel capacity.
Riley Turbo-Rocket
Riley Rocket with each engine fitted with two Riley-manufactured turbochargers. Cruise speed increased from 252 mph (219 kn; 406 km/h) to 302 mph (262 kn; 486 km/h).

== Operators ==
=== Civil ===
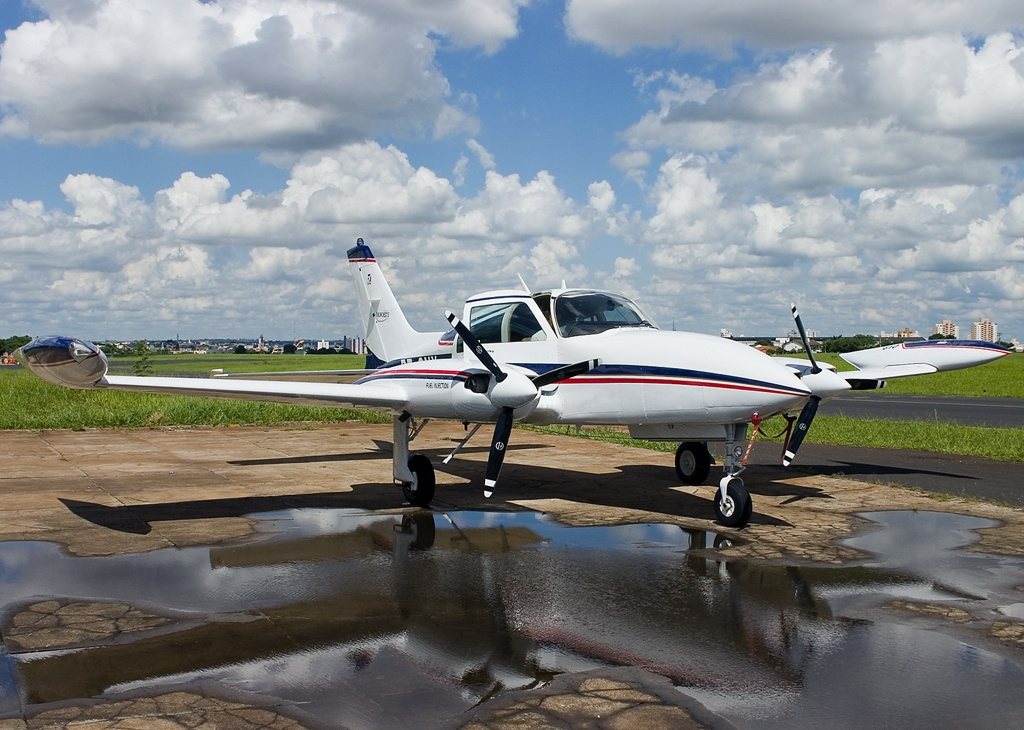
Cessna 310R of Taxi Aereo Noroeste in Brazil

The aircraft is popular with air charter companies and small feeder airlines, and is operated by private individuals and companies.

Australia

- Hinterland Aviation

=== Military operators ===
Countries known to have operated the U-3/310 include.

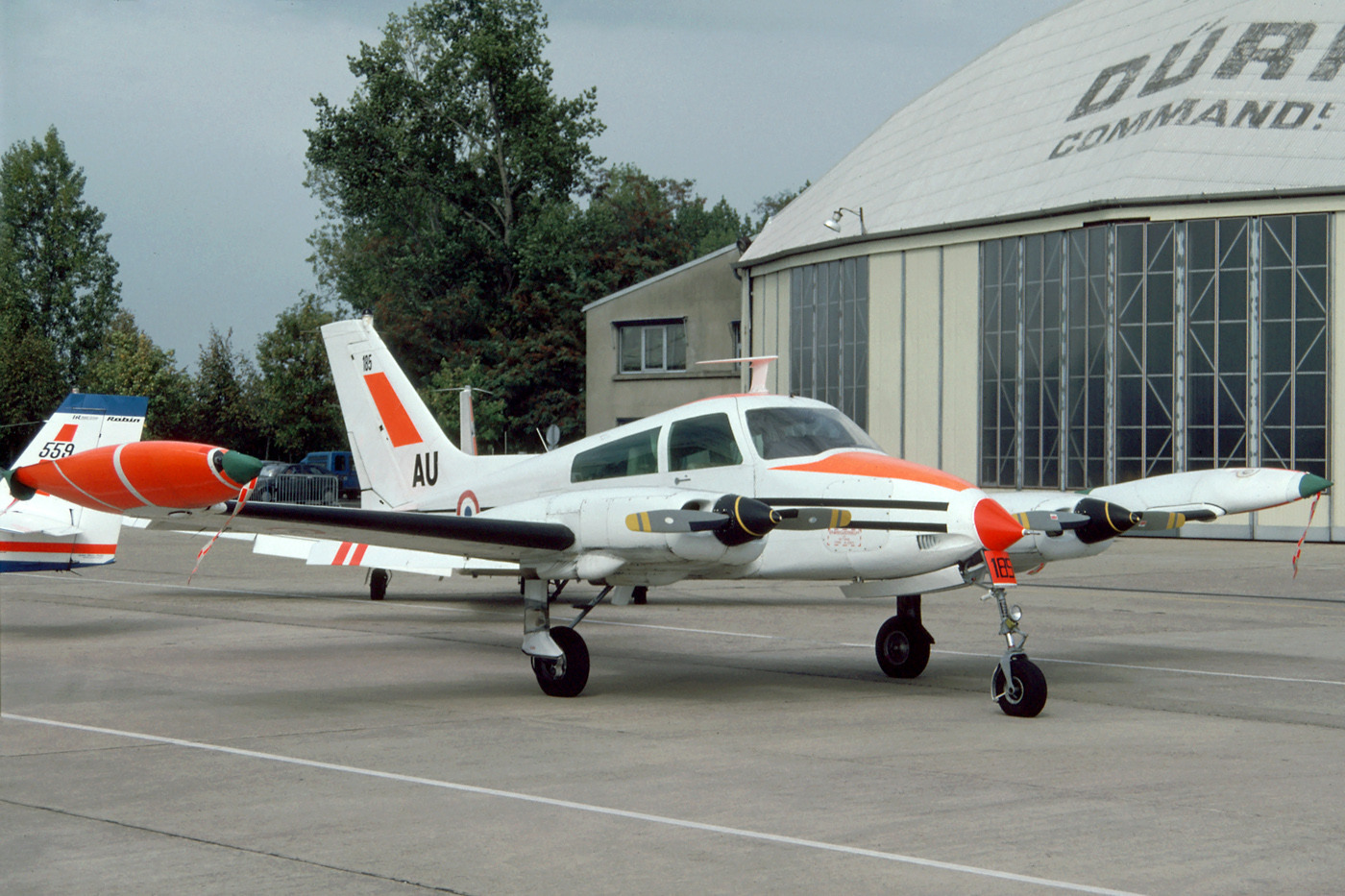
Cessna 310M of the French Air Force, shown here in 1992

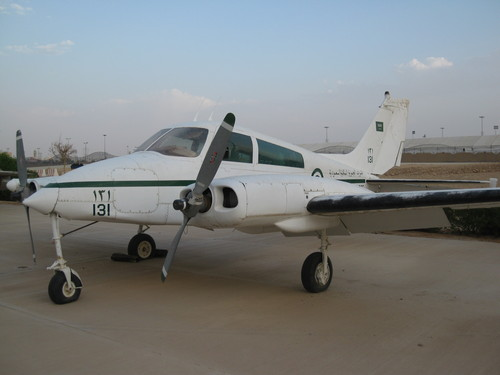
Royal Saudi Air Force Cessna 310 in Riyadh

Argentina

- Argentine Air Force — Cessna 310 and 320 models

Bolivia
Colombia

- Colombian Air Force

Republic of the Congo
France

- French Air and Space Force — 12 operated

Haiti

- Haiti Air Corps

Indonesia

- Indonesian Air Force
- Indonesian Army Aviation

Iran
Madagascar

- Air Force of Madagascar — One 310R

Mexico

- Mexican Naval Aviation

Paraguay

- Paraguayan Air Force

Peru

- Peruvian Navy

Philippines

- Philippine Air Force

Saudi Arabia
Suriname

- Suriname Air Force

Tanzania

- Tanzanian Air Force

United States

- United States Air Force received 196 L-27A and L-27B (later redesignated U-3A and B).
- United States Army received 25 ex-US Air Force L-27As (later U-3As) and at least 13 L-27Bs (later U-3B) from 1960.

Uruguay

- Uruguayan Air Force (One 310R)

Venezuela

- Venezuelan Navy

Zaire

- Zaire Air Force

== Accidents and incidents ==
As of May 2026, the US National Transportation Safety Board has recorded 1,835 incidents involving Cessna 310s in its online database since 12 January 1964 (earlier incidents and minor incidents are not included in the database). Of these, 406 were fatal accidents.

- On October 28, 1959, a Cessna 310 carrying Cuban revolutionary Camilo Cienfuegos disappeared over the Atlantic Ocean on a night flight from Camagüey to Havana. Neither the aircraft nor the body of Cienfuegos were ever found.
- On November 26, 1962, a Saab Scandia 90A-1, aircraft registration PP-SRA of VASP on a scheduled domestic service in Brazil from São Paulo-Congonhas to Rio de Janeiro-Santos Dumont collided in the air over Paraibuna, São Paulo, with a private Cessna 310 PT-BRQ en route from Rio de Janeiro-Santos Dumont to São Paulo-Campo de Marte. Both were flying on the same airway in opposite directions and failed to have visual contact. The two aircraft crashed killing all 23 passengers and crew of the Saab and the four occupants of the Cessna.
- On July 19, 1967, a Boeing 727 operating as Piedmont Airlines Flight 22 collided with a Cessna 310 near Hendersonville, North Carolina, killing all 79 people on board the Boeing 727 and the three people in the Cessna.
- On October 16, 1972, US Congressmen Nick Begich of Alaska, and Hale Boggs of Louisiana, disappeared over Alaska while flying in a 310C during a campaign trip.
- On October 4, 1975, a chartered 310Q crashed on final approach to New Hanover County Airport while transporting wrestlers Bob Bruggers, Ric Flair, Johnny Valentine and Tim Woods and promoter David Crockett to a professional wrestling match in nearby Wilmington, North Carolina. Bruggers and Flair were seriously injured, while Valentine was paralyzed and the pilot subsequently died of his injuries. The aircraft was overloaded and its center of gravity was beyond the aft limit; attempting to mitigate these problems, the pilot drained fuel before the flight, causing fuel exhaustion before the aircraft reached the runway.
- On September 11, 1981, a T310P crashed into an upper wall of the Swing Auditorium in San Bernardino, California, killing both aircraft occupants; the crash and a major ensuing fire caused severe damage to the building's roof, structural members, insulation, and about a third of the bleachers. The building was ultimately deemed beyond repair and was razed seven months later.
- On June 29, 1989, concert organist Keith Chapman and his wife were killed when their 310Q piloted by Chapman crashed into the Sangre de Cristo Mountains of the Colorado Rockies while they were returning from a performance in California.
- On December 13, 2005, serial killer Roberto Wagner Fernandes was flying a Cessna 310 to Argentina when it crashed in Misiones Department, Paraguay. He was identified as the murderer of three women in the US several years after his death.

== Aircraft on display ==
- U-3A "Blue Canoe" 58-2124 is on display at the National Museum of the United States Air Force in Dayton, Ohio. The aircraft is one of several transferred from the USAF to the U.S. Army, and was flown to the museum in September 1984.
- 310 N6775X, a 1955 model formerly flown by actor Jimmy Stewart, has been restored and placed as a gate guardian at Indiana County-Jimmy Stewart Airport in Indiana, Pennsylvania. The aircraft is mounted on a pedestal to act as a weather vane, and its propellers rotate with the wind.

== Specifications (1956 model 310) ==
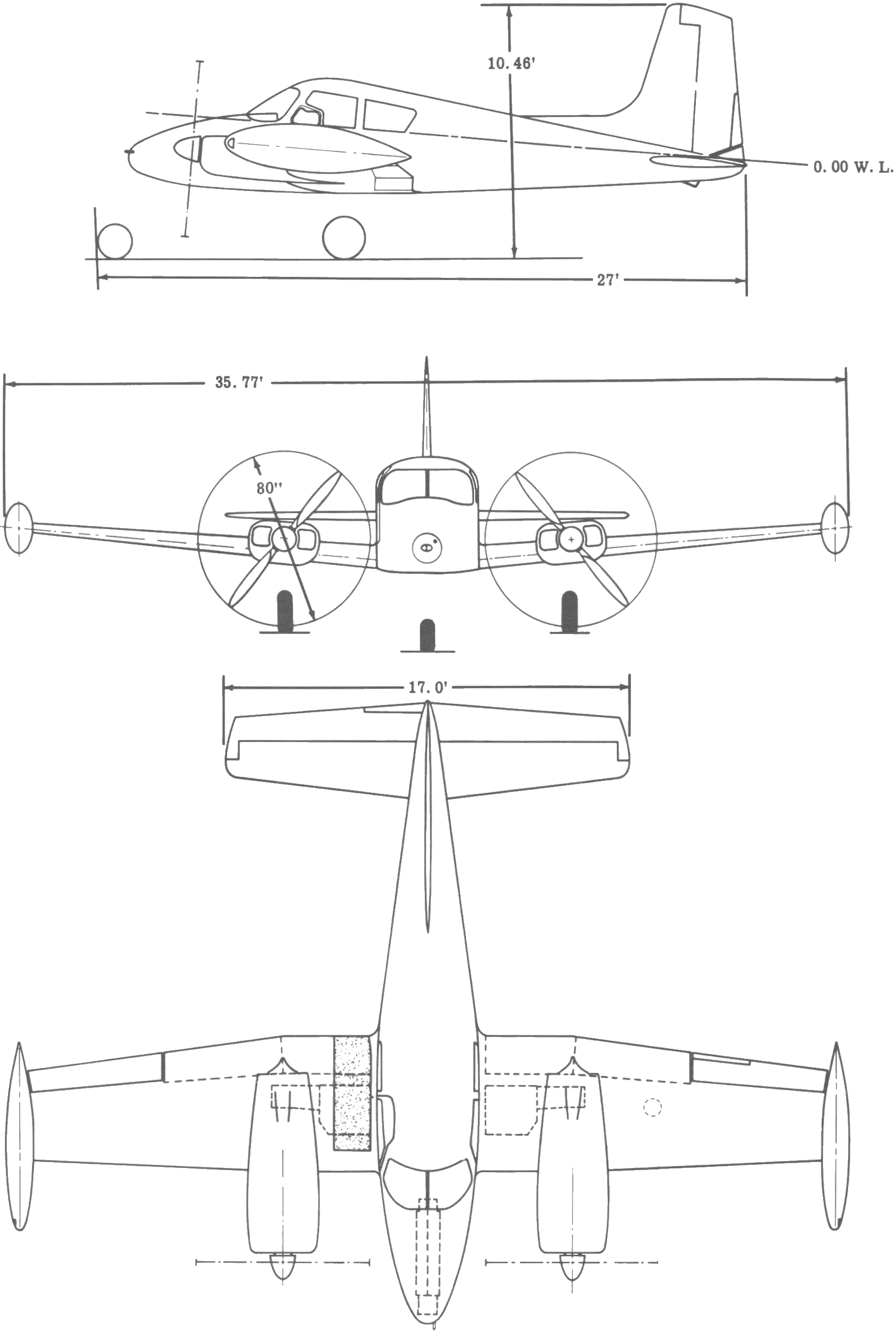
3-view line drawing of the Cessna L-27A

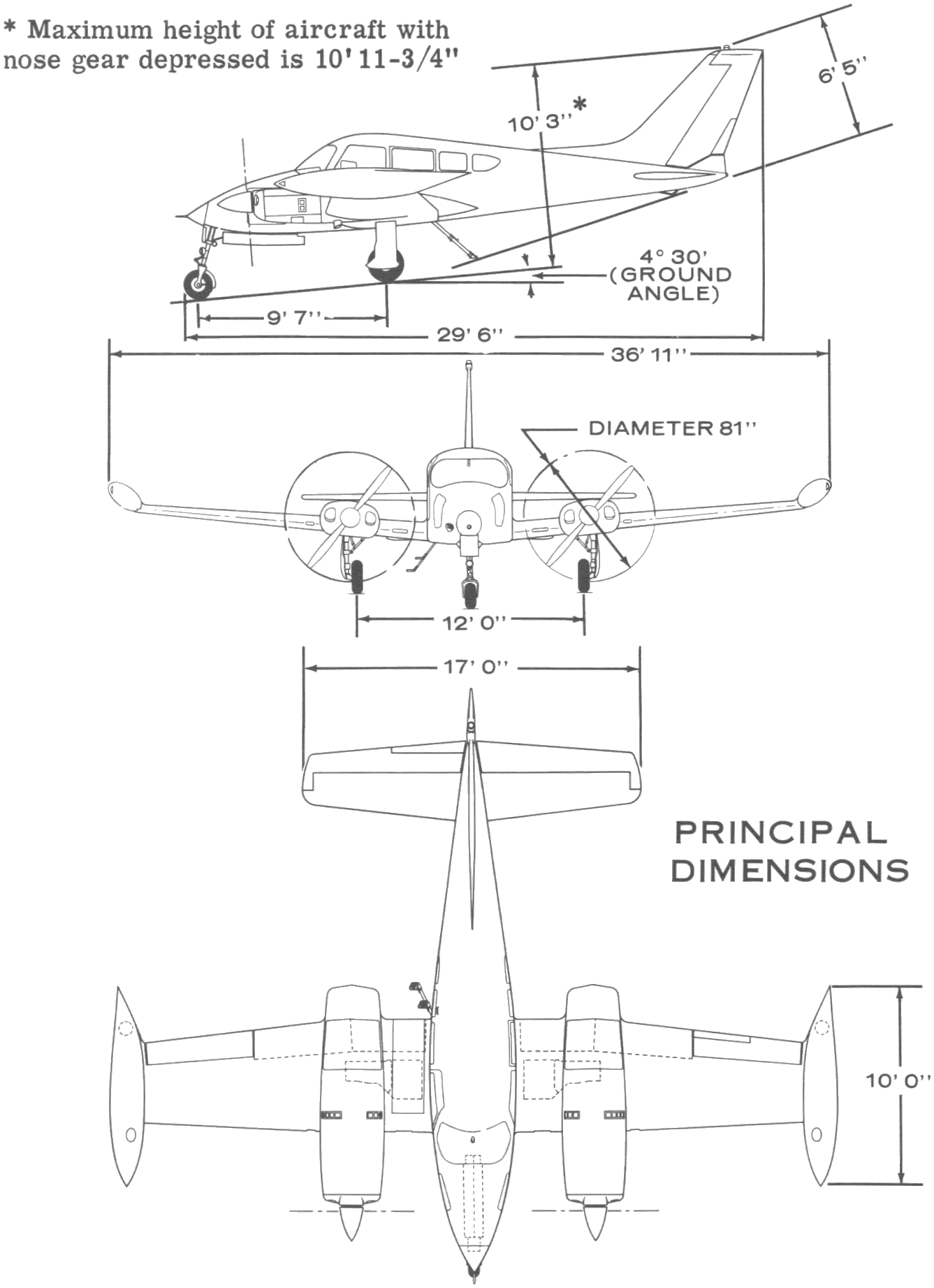
3-view line drawing of the Cessna 320F Executive Skyknight

Data from 1956 Observers Book of Aircraft

General characteristics

- Crew: one
- Capacity: four passengers
- Length: 27 ft 0 in (8.23 m)
- Wingspan: 35 ft 0 in (10.67 m)
- Height: 10 ft 6 in (3.20 m)
- Wing area: 175 sq ft (16.3 m^{2})
- Empty weight: 2,850 lb (1,293 kg)
- Gross weight: 4,600 lb (2,087 kg)
- Fuel capacity: 100 US gal (83 imp gal; 380 L)
- Powerplant: 2 × Continental O-470-B horizontally opposed piston engine, 240 hp (180 kW) each

Performance

- Maximum speed: 220 mph (350 km/h, 190 kn)
- Cruise speed: 205 mph (330 km/h, 178 kn)
- Range: 1,000 mi (1,600 km, 870 nmi)
- Service ceiling: 20,000 ft (6,100 m)
- Rate of climb: 1,700 ft/min (8.6 m/s)

== See also ==
Aircraft of comparable role, configuration, and era

- Beagle B.206
- Beechcraft Baron
- Beechcraft Travel Air
- Beechcraft Twin Bonanza
- Let L-200 Morava
- Piper PA-23
- Piper PA-34 Seneca
