= South Florida serial murders =

Unsolved serial murders

Details
- Victims: 10 total victims (6 unsolved)
- Span of crimes: February 25, 1997 – August 2001
- Country: United States
- State: Florida
- Date apprehended: Tiller in 2001, Roberto Wagner Fernandes identified as perpetrator after death, other(s) unapprehended

Between February 1997 and August 2001, a series of mostly unsolved murders of disenfranchised women occurred in South Florida, one of whom was former Playboy model Star Stowe.

== Murders ==
On February 25, 1997, Sandra Kay Walters, 32, was found strangled and nude behind an adult bookstore in Palm Beach County. Police believe she was picked up and murdered by a john. Walters had a history of drug use and prostitution.

On March 16, 1997, 40-year-old Star Stowe's half-naked body was discovered in the bushes behind an Eckerd pharmacy in Coral Springs. Stowe was Playmate of the Month for the February 1977 issue of Playboy magazine and a former girlfriend of Gene Simmons. Stowe had moved to Fort Lauderdale in 1986 in hopes of becoming an exotic dancer. There, she was said to have fallen into drug addiction and prostitution.

On November 21, 1997, Theresa Kettner, 41, was found murdered in a grassy area behind Turtle Run Shoppes in Coral Springs.

On November 28, 1997, the body of 36-year-old Tammy M. Strunk was found in a trash bin at a shopping center in Sunrise, Florida. Strunk was homeless and had last been seen three days before her murder at a Salvation Army. After Strunk's death, police began to consider a possible, although unconfirmed, connection to the murders and collected evidence, including a unique dark-blue towel with the monogrammed letters "JSM", which appeared to have been disposed of along with the body.

In January 1999, 44-year-old Sheila Griffin, a former nurse, was found partially clothed and strangled to death in a vacant lot in Fort Lauderdale.

In February 1999, the strangled body of Crystal Martin was found in a motel in Fort Lauderdale.

In June 2000, Melissa Ljames, 30, was found murdered and dumped in a canal in Fort Lauderdale. She had a minor criminal record.

== Suspects ==
=== Joel Tiller ===
On June 27, 2001, a homeless man named Joel Tiller was arrested in Miami after DNA connected him to the rape and murder of Sheila Griffin. He was also connected to the rape and robbery of an 88-year-old tourist in Orlando committed in January 2001. At the time of his arrest, he was awaiting trial for charges of assault, attempted sexual assault, and armed burglary. He was previously convicted of raping and murdering a woman in Georgia in 1968, lighting a woman on fire in front of her daughter, and choking and raping a woman in San Diego in 1996. He received two life sentences in 2003. Investigators acknowledged the possibility of his involvement in other murders.

=== Roberto Fernandes ===
Roberto Wagner Fernandes, who died in a plane crash in Paraguay in 2005, was connected in 2021 to three murders in the area originally grouped with the others: Kim Dietz-Livesey, killed in June 2000; Sia Demas, killed in August 2000; and Jessica Good, whose body was discovered in the Biscayne Bay in August 2001. Police believe he may have been responsible for other unsolved murders in South Florida, but as of yet, only three have been confirmed.

== See also ==
- 2007 Boca Raton murders
- Gulf Killer
- List of serial killers in the United States
- List of unsolved murders (1980–1999)
