= Sandy Johnson =

American model and actress (born 1954)

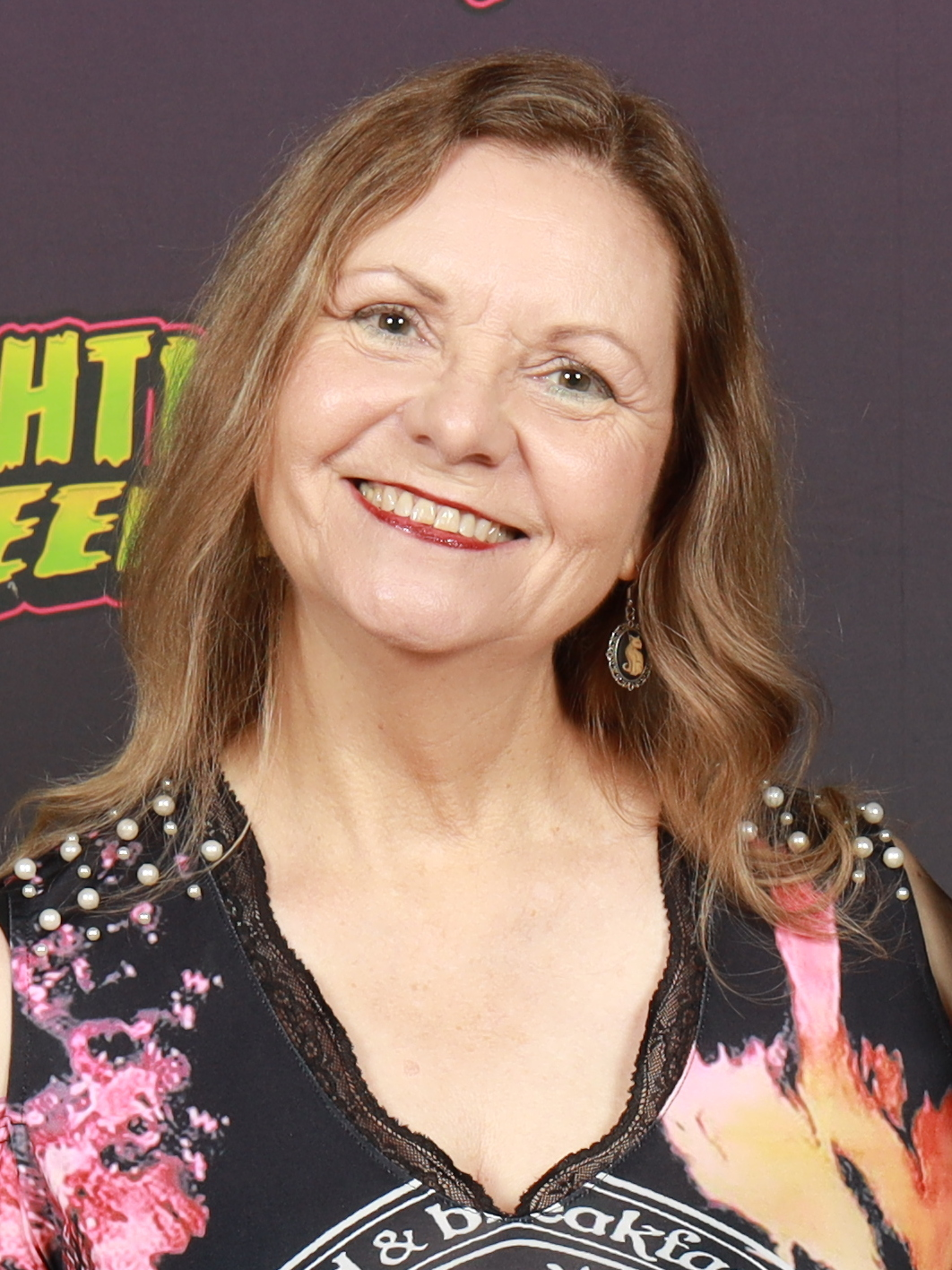
- Johnson in 2024

Playboy centerfold appearance
- June 1974
- Preceded by: Marilyn Lange
- Succeeded by: Carol Vitale

Personal details
- Born: July 7, 1954 (age 72) San Antonio, Texas
- Height: 5 ft 6 in (1.68 m)

Sandy Johnson (born July 7, 1954) is an American model and actress. She was Playboy magazine's Playmate of the Month for the June 1974 issue. Her centerfold was photographed by Mario Casilli. (A cropped image from this centerfold was used as a top-sheet graphic for the Burton Love 52 snowboard in 2008.)

Johnson was born into a family that included four older sisters in San Antonio, Texas. She attended Santa Monica Community College, then proceeded to obtain her master's degree and PhD degree in Texas. After she appeared in Playboy Johnson went into acting. Her credits include Halloween (1978) as Judith Myers, the sister and first victim of murderer Michael Myers, Gas Pump Girls (1979) and H.O.T.S. (1979), alongside fellow Playmate Pamela Jean Bryant and eventual Playboy model K.C. Winkler.

== Filmography ==
- Surfer Girls (1978)
- Jokes My Folks Never Told Me (1978) – Various roles
- Halloween (1978) – Judith Myers
- H.O.T.S. (1979) – Stephanie
- Gas Pump Girls (1979) – April
- Terror in the Aisles (1984) – Judith Myers (archive footage)
- Halloween (2018) – Judith Myers (stock footage)

== See also ==
- List of people in Playboy 1970–1979

Nancy Cameron	Francine Parks	Pamela Zinszer	Marlene Morrow	Marilyn Lange	Sandy Johnson
Carol Vitale	Jean Manson	Kristine Hanson	Ester Cordet	Bebe Buell	Janice Raymond
