= Invitation to Hell =

Invitation to Hell may refer to:

- Invitation to Hell (1982 film), British horror film
- Invitation to Hell (1984 film), American television horror film
