= H.O.T.S. =

1979 American sex comedy film

- Directed by: Gerald Seth Sindell
- Written by: W. Terry Davis
- Screenplay by: Cheri Caffaro; Joan Buchanan
- Story by: W. Terry Davis; Cheri Caffaro; Joan Buchanan
- Produced by: W. Terry Davis; Don Schain
- Starring: Lisa London; Susan Kiger
- Cinematography: Harvey Genkins
- Edited by: Barbara Pokras
- Music by: David Davis
- Distributed by: Mid-America Releasing; Anchor Bay Entertainment
- Release date: July 20, 1979 (USA)
- Running time: 98 minutes
- Country: United States
- Language: English
- Box office: $1.4 million

H.O.T.S. is a 1979 American sex comedy. The film stars three Playboy Playmates — Susan Kiger (January, 1977), Pamela Bryant (April, 1978), and Sandy Johnson (June, 1974), as well as former Miss USA of 1972, Lindsay Bloom, sexploitation actress Angela Aames, and later genre movie veteran Lisa London in her film debut. Danny Bonaduce appears in a supporting role.

The cast frequently appears in tight white T-shirts with the H.O.T.S. logo and red-orange shorts. Some reviewers believe this wardrobe inspired the Hooters uniforms.

== Plot ==
Honey Shayne is a freshman at Fairenville University (known, according to a title card, as "Good old F.U."). After unsuccessfully pledging the Pi sorority, and being publicly ridiculed by sorority president Melody Ragmore, Honey joins with three other unsuccessful pledges (O'Hara, Teri, and Samantha to form a new sorority (to be known as H.O.T.S. after their initials) with the goal of stealing all of the rival sorority's boyfriends.

The movie includes a number of competitions intended to accomplish that goal, including a fundraiser (a kissing booth), a dance, and a climactic game of strip football. Both groups play pranks on the other and attempt to avoid disciplinary actions from the F.U. administration. A subplot deals with the attempts of two bungling gangsters to recover money hidden in the renovated building housing the sorority.

A running gag during the movie is the source of the name "H.O.T.S." While the closing credits reveal that the name is an acronym of the first names of the four founders, other characters in the film believe it to stand for Hands Off Those Suckers and Hold On To Sex. At one point, the girls claim it stands for Help Out The Seals.

== Cast ==
=== Main ===
- Susan Kiger as Honey Shayne
- Lisa London as O'Hara
- Pamela Jean Bryant as Teri Lynn
- Kimberly Cameron as Samantha
- Mary Steelsmith as Clutz
- Angela Aames as Boom-Boom Bangs
- Marjorie Andrade as Conchita
- Cece Bullard as Debbie
- Karen Smith as Candi
- Robyn Martin as Brandy
- Lindsay Bloom as Melody Ragmore
- K.C. Winkler as Cynthia
- Sandy Johnson as Stephanie
- Marilyn Rubin as Jackie

=== Supporting ===
- Constance Carlton as Pi Girl
- Marion Leeuw as Pi Girl
- Nancy Plummer as Pi Girl
- Cynthia Nigh as Pi Girl
- Cendi Campbell as Pi Girl
- Donald Petrie as Doug
- Larry Gilman as Mad Dog
- Dan Reed as Stormin' Normin'
- Danny Bonaduce as Richie Walker
- David Gibbs as Macho Man
- Marvin Katzoff as Big Boy
- Steve Bond as John
- Talmadge Scott as Hunk (credited as Talmage Scott)
- Ken Olfson as Dean Larry Chase
- Richard Bakalyan as Charlie Ingels (credited as Dick Bakalyan)
- Louis Guss as Bugs Benny
- Dorothy Meyer as Ezzetta
- Scott Ellsworth as Professor
- Bunny Summers as Opera Singer
- Harvey Parry as Officer O'Toole
- Ted Grossman as Officer Goldstein
- Gary Lee Davis as Patterson Man #1
- Dar Robinson as Patterson Man #2
- C.D. Smith as Patterson Man #3
- Wayne King Sr. as Patterson Man #4 (credited as Wayne King)
- Pat Moorehead as Pilot
- Angel Pineira as Lady with Shopping Cart
- Slinky as Himself
- Sugar Bear as Honey Bear

== Release ==
H.O.T.S. was released in May 1979 in the U.S. It was released in the early 1980s throughout Western Europe. In West Germany, the film was released under the title of T&A Academy, which was also the film's working title in the U.S.

=== Critical response ===
Review aggregation website Rotten Tomatoes, which collects both contemporary and modern reviews, gives the film a score of 29% based on reviews from 7 critics.

A review at The Video Graveyard found that "It lacks any real focus instead going for an "everything but the kitchen sink" attitude in its attempts to ape Animal House every chance it gets. Granted, it could've been yet another forgettable, toss-away T&A effort like Cherry Hill High and a ton of other mid-70s flicks were but a lot of why it's somewhat watchable should be credited to its good-natured cast, plentiful bare boobs, and that sweet, sweet huddle cam".

=== Home media ===
H.O.T.S. was released on DVD by Anchor Bay Entertainment in 2012. It is now out of print and the movie never received a Blu-ray release.
