= Dorothy Meyer =

American actress

- in Sanford and Son (1973)
- Born: November 6, 1924; Indianapolis, Indiana, U.S.
- Died: September 24, 1987 (aged 62); Los Angeles, California, U.S.
- Occupation: Actress
- Years active: 1931–1987

Dorothy Meyer (November 6, 1924 – September 24, 1987) was an American character actress of film and television who made a name for herself portraying wisecracking maids, neighbors, friends, nurses, and church ladies throughout the 1970s and 1980s.

== Life and career ==
Meyer was born in Indianapolis, Indiana, on November 6, 1924, the daughter of a Presbyterian minister, a religion to which she adhered to throughout her entire life. During her childhood, Meyer initially began her career as an actress singing and dancing in numerous Christian themed productions on The Bible Belt and was later inspired to further pursue acting following the Oscar win of African-American actress Hattie McDaniel in Gone with the Wind. During World War II, Meyer's worked as both a secretary and typist in a steel factory in her native Indiana during the daytime and later started appearing in amateur theatre during nights and her weekends off.

In the early 1950s, she moved to California and began her career modeling, appearing in advertisements for such popular brand names as Maxwell House Coffee, Hallmark Greeting Cards, Westinghouse, Walgreens, Sears Roebuck, and Hersey's Chocolates. After two decades of advertisement modeling, she made her small screen debut in a 1971 episode of The Bill Cosby Show. Between 1971 and 1987, she would have 42 credits to her resume, including appearances on such syndicated programs as That's My Mama, Sanford and Son, The Waltons, Starsky & Hutch, The Jeffersons, Lou Grant, Hill Street Blues, Murder, She Wrote, and 227. She enjoyed a successful career and appeared alongside such notables as Linda Blair, Richard Pryor, and Muhammad Ali.

Aside from acting, Meyer was also noted as being a staunch liberal Democrat and African American rights activist, who was very supportive of the National Association for the Advancement of Colored People and spoke on numerous occasions regarding civil liberties in low-income communities. She also had a great deal of support and admiration for the administrations of John F. Kennedy and Jimmy Carter. Meyer died in Los Angeles, California on September 24, 1987, from undisclosed causes, at the age of 62. As per her last will and testament, Meyer was cremated with her ashes scattered at sea. She was unmarried, had no children, and her only survivors were distant cousins, two older brothers, one sister, and a few nieces and nephews. Two films she had made, Moving (1988) and Wildfire (1988), were released posthumously.

== Filmography ==
Year	Title	Role	Notes
1971	The Bill Cosby Show	Gloria's Mother	Episode: "The Green-Eyed Monster"
1972	The New Temperatures Rising Show	Admissions Clerk	Episode: "The Spy"
1972	Circle of Fear	Woman	Episode: "Time of Terror"
1973	The Waltons	Mrs. Blankfort	Episode: "The Chicken Thief"
1973	A Dream for Christmas	Cousin Clara	TV movie, Uncredited
1973-1975	Sanford and Son	Aunt Flossie / Mrs. Walker	3 episodes
1974	Owen Marshall, Counselor at Law	Mrs. Green	Episode: "I've Promised You a Father: Part 2"
1974	The Family Kovack	Nurse	TV movie
1974	Airport 1975	Passenger	Uncredited
1974	That's My Mama	Ruby Lester	3 episodes
1975	Miles to Go Before I Sleep	Hattie	TV movie
1975	The Blue Knight	Shopper	Episode: "Pilot"
1975	The Rookies	Nadine Brooks	Episode: "Reign of Terror"
1975	Insight	Nora	Episode: "Hunger Knows My Name"
1976	Grady	Ernestine Johnson	Episode: "Night School"
1976	Helter Skelter	Housekeeper	TV movie
1976	Having Babies	Admitting Nurse	TV movie
1977	The Greatest	Odessa Clay	
1977	Panic in Echo Park		TV movie
1977	Rafferty	Mrs. Greener	Episode: "A Point of View"
1977	Sanford Arms	Sarah Calvin	Episode: "The Grandparents"
1977	Starsky & Hutch	Mrs. Walters / Mrs. Marlowe	2 episodes
1978	The Jeffersons	Cassie Kincaid	Episode: "Florence's Union"
1979	How the West Was Won	Hattie	Episode: "The Scavengers"
1979	H.O.T.S.	Ezzetta	
1979	Lou Grant	Lady	Episode: "Gambling"
1979	Roller Boogie	Ada	
1979	Diff'rent Strokes	Mrs. Keith	Episode: "The Dog Story"
1981	Flamingo Road		Episode: "Trapped"
1981	Whose Life Is It Anyway?	2nd Nurse	
1982	King's Crossing	Willa Bristol	10 episodes
1983	Newhart	Nurse	Episode: "Ricky Nelson, Up Your Nose"
1983	Ryan's Four		Episode: "Ryan's Four"
1983-1985	Hill Street Blues	Witness / Cook	2 episodes
1984	Gimme a Break!	Sarah Banks	Episode: "Valentine"
1985	Do You Remember Love?	Social Director	TV movie
1986	Hollywood Vice Squad	Heavyset Woman	
1986	Cobra	Nurse #1	
1986	Murder, She Wrote	Nurse O'Hanlon	Episode: "Deadline for Murder"
1987	227	Ruby Jenkins	Episode: "Happy Twentieth"
1988	Moving	Grandma	
1988	Wildfire	Esther	(final film role)
