= You'll Never Make Love in This Town Again =

1996 book about prostitution in the US

- Author: Joanne Parrent
- Publication date: December 1995
- ISBN: 0-787-10404-3

You'll Never Make Love in This Town Again is a book published in January 1996 which describes the stories of three prostitutes and one actress about their sexual encounters with various Hollywood celebrities. The sisters Robin Greer and Liza Greer are contributors, along with Linda Hammond and Alexandra D. Datig, identified in the book as "Tiffany". The book generated extensive notoriety and sales, and was also the subject of a low-budget documentary.

The book was the subject of several reported lawsuits. On 1 March 1996, the woman referred to as "Tiffany" sued the publisher Dove Books, and its executive, Michael Viner. The action was dismissed by the Superior Court on October 23, 1996, but on July 15, 1999, it was reinstated and remanded for further proceedings by the California Court of Appeal (Second District). In its published opinion, the court noted that "it appears that defense counsel violated several state wide rules of court and local rules, and that these violations resulted in unnecessary litigation and cost to plaintiff and her attorney in time and money," and instructed the Superior Court to consider sanctions against defendants and their attorneys. Linda Hammond sued Viner for sexual harassment. The suit was dropped.

In another case, Viner sued Hollywood madam Heidi Fleiss for slander, based on statements Fleiss made on a radio talk show about Viner and authors of the book. In 2000 a jury ruled in Fleiss's favor. In another case, one of the authors claimed that she had been forced unfairly to agree to reduced royalties under her contract with the publisher, and she won a jury verdict in her favor.

There were two sequels: Once More with Feeling: You'll Never Make Love in This Town Again Again was published in 1996. It told the stories of prostitute Michelle (who appears on the cover), prostitute Lisa, and graphic artist Sophie, among others.

Hooking Up: You'll Never Make Love in This Town Again Again, appeared in 2006. It told the tales of prostitute Olivia, porn publicist Carly Milne, and prostitute Amanda.

== Books ==
- You'll Never Make Love in This Town Again by Robin Greer et al., Dove Books, Beverly Hills, CA (1995). ISBN 0-7871-0404-3
- Once More with Feeling: You'll Never Make Love in This Town Again Again by Michelle, Lisa et al. Dove Books, Beverly Hills, CA (1996). ISBN 0-7871-1035-3
- Hooking Up: You'll Never Make Love in This Town Again Again by Olivia et al., Phoenix Books (October 2006) ISBN 1-59777-504-5
