= Roberto Wagner Fernandes =

Brazilian serial killer

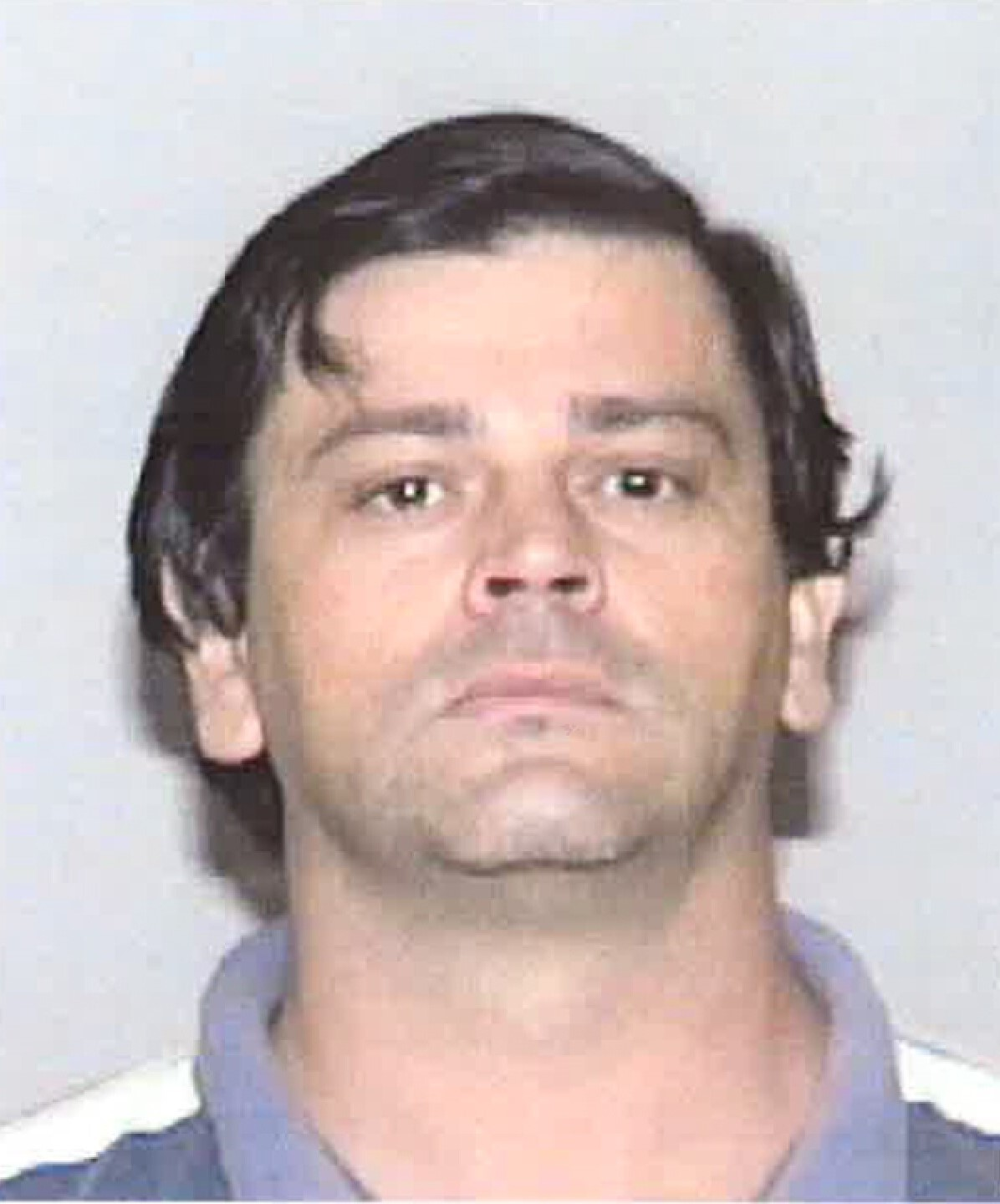
- Born: April 26, 1965; Londrina, Brazil
- Died: December 13, 2005 (aged 40); Misiones Department, Paraguay
- Status: Deceased

Details
- Victims: 3–4+
- Span of crimes: 2000 – 2001 (confirmed); 1996 (possible)
- Country: United States (possibly Brazil)
- States: Florida (possibly Paraná)

Roberto Wagner Fernandes (April 26, 1965 – December 13, 2005) was a Brazilian serial killer and rapist who was posthumously linked to the murders of three prostitutes in Miami, Florida from 2000 to 2001. Fernandes, who had been acquitted of murder in the 1996 shooting of his wife, died in a plane crash in Paraguay before he could be arrested for his crimes, and since his identification, investigators in both the United States and Brazil have said that he might have been responsible for other murders.

== Shooting of wife ==
On the early morning of November 18, 1996, neighbors of a residential building in Londrina, Brazil were disturbed by a domestic dispute coming from one of the apartments, which ended after at least six shots were fired. After notifying the police that the man had fled in his car together with his 5-year-old daughter, officers soon managed to arrest him. The accused was Roberto Wagner Fernandes, a 31-year-old licensed pilot, who had shot his wife, 27-year-old teacher Danyelle Amaral Bouças Fernandes, with a Taurus TCP 738. She was driven to the hospital, but died of her injuries shortly afterwards.

The murder came as a shock to the locals, all of whom considered both Danyelle and Roberto to be very polite and friendly people who took care of their daughter. However, after he was brought to trial, it was revealed that the scuffle had occurred after she had caught Fernandes cheating on her with a prostitute. Fernandes himself alleged that, during their fight, Danyelle had threatened to shoot him with a revolver, causing him to panic and accidentally kill her using his handgun. However, at a later point, prosecutors revealed that the prostitute had come by the police station, alleging that Fernandes had attempted to kill her. In the woman's account, she claimed that he had snorted cocaine and drank large quantities of whiskey during their meeting, and at one point, Fernandes started to kick, punch and beat her with a water bottle. This eventually spiralled into him attempting to drown her in the motel's bathtub, but she managed to free herself and run towards the door, which she opened. Upon doing so, Fernandes immediately calmed down and told her to put on her clothes, after which she put on her clothes and they both left the premises. She later claimed that she had phoned him to check the authenticity of the check he had supposedly paid her with.

To counter these accusations, Fernandes and his lawyers claimed that his wife had been drunk and acting irrationally, while simultaneously trying to discredit the prostitute's testimony. In their account, she was the one who had hit him during their sexual encounter, ostensibly for being underpaid for her services, and the phone call was to further extort him out of more money. Despite the conflicting physical evidence against Fernandes, he was ultimately acquitted due to lack of evidence.

== Move to Miami and murders ==
Following the verdict, it was alleged that Bouças' family members were so enraged by the outcome that they hired a hitman to kill Fernandes. Supposedly fearing for his life and wanting to leave the past behind, Fernandes fled to the United States, where he settled in Miami, Florida. In the period between 1996 and 1999, he worked as a bus driver for a touring company and as a flight attendant at the Miami International Airport. During this time, he continued to use prostitution services regularly.

On June 24, 2000, two motorists from Boca Raton were travelling along the Flamingo Road near Cooper City when they came across a suitcase by the roadside. Once they opened it, they found the nude body of a woman inside it. The body was sent for autopsy, and two days later, the coroner identified her as 35-year-old Kim Dietz-Livesey, a prostitute with a record for alcohol and drug abuse who had been arrested on June 7 for prostitution. Her death came as a shock to her friends from Alcoholics Anonymous and a biker enthusiast group. In an effort to generate leads on the case, police sought assistance from the public, but nothing substantial came of it and the case went cold.

On August 9, 2000, passers-by found a duffel bag discarded by the road near Dania Beach. In it, they found the body of prostitute Sia Demas, who had been strangled to death. On August 30, 2001, the body of another prostitute rife with stab wounds, Jessica Good, was found floating in the Biscayne Bay. According to her boyfriend, she had gone to meet a "light-skinned Hispanic man", but never came back.

== Return to Brazil and death ==
Shortly after Good's body was recovered, Fernandes was identified as a suspect in her murder. Before he could be arrested, however, he fled back to Brazil, which does not have an extradition treaty with the United States. Over the next five years, Fernandes was named as a suspect in other violent crimes against prostitutes in his native country, including a 2003 rape, but was never arrested.

On December 13, 2005, Fernandes was flying a Cessna 310 en route to Argentina, when he lost control and crashed in Misiones Department, Paraguay. He died instantly, and his remains were then buried in his native city.

== Identification ==
In 2011, fingerprints from Fernandes were matched to all three crime scenes, prompting investigators to travel to Brazil in hopes to talk to him. However, they were then informed that he had died in an aviation accident back in 2005. The American investigators had some reservations, as they speculated he might have faked his own death, but at the time, they were unable to obtain permission to exhume his remains.

The case was stalled until 2018, when an unrelated murder case involving a Cuban national was prosecuted in his home country, setting a precedent that could allow detectives to resume the case. In 2020, with help from the Brazilian Federal Police, authorities exhumed Fernandes' grave and conducted tests to determine whether they were really his. The break came on August 31, 2021, when the Sheriff of Broward County, Gregory Tony, announced in a press conference that Fernandes has been officially identified as the killer of the three women in Miami, and that he indeed had perished in the plane crash. Since his identification, authorities in both the United States and Brazil have started investigating Fernandes' past, as they consider it likely that he had killed more than what he has currently been connected to.

== See also ==
- South Florida serial murders
- List of serial killers in the United States
