= Susan Kiger =

American model and actress (born 1953)

Susan Lynn Kiger

Playboy centerfold appearance
- January 1977
- Preceded by: Karen Hafter
- Succeeded by: Star Stowe

Personal details
- Born: November 16, 1953 (age 72) Pasadena, California, United States
- Height: 5 ft 8 in (1.73 m)

Susan Lynn Kiger (born November 16, 1953, in Pasadena, California) is an American model and actress. Kiger was the Playboy Playmate of the Month for January 1977. Her centerfold was photographed by Pompeo Posar and Ken Marcus. In addition, she appeared on the cover of Playboy three times: March 1977, November 1977, and April 1978.

Making her debut in the adult movie Deadly Love (or Hot Nasties, 1976), she went on to appear in several films, including the sex comedy H.O.T.S. (1979) alongside fellow Playmate Pamela Bryant, Angels Revenge (1979), Seven (1979), The Happy Hooker Goes Hollywood (1980), Galaxina (1980) with fellow Playmate Dorothy Stratten, The Return (1980), and the horror film Death Screams (1982).

Susan Kiger	Star Stowe	Nicki Thomas	Lisa Sohm	Sheila Mullen	Virve Reid
Sondra Theodore	Julia Lyndon	Debra Jo Fondren	Kristine Winder	Rita Lee	Ashley Cox
