= Gulf Killer =

Unsolved serial murder case in the United States

- Other names: Red Light Murders; The Dale Mabry Strip Murders
- Years active: c. October 15, 1971 – December 31, 1978

Details
- Victims: 16 (14 women, 2 men)
- Country: United States
- State: Florida
- Date apprehended: Wirtjes convicted in 1979; Hardagree convicted in 1980; other(s) unapprehended

The Gulf Killer is the nickname given to a possible serial killer who was active in the Pasco County and the wider Tampa Bay area of Florida, United States. A group of unsolved (Note: With the exceptions of Jo Ann Parnell and Cindy Carlton Stewart) murders of fourteen women and two men were committed between 1971 and 1978. While the victims were grouped together differently at various points, nine were attributed, dubiously, to a single killer. Whether the murders were connected to one or multiple individuals, feuding pimps, criminal organizations, or a sexually depraved killer was never determined. At least eight of the victims were involved in sex work on the Dale Mabry Strip.

== Murders ==
Four of the victims, clockwise from top left: Diana Valleck, Joan Foster, Molly Newell, Emily Grieve

=== 1971–1976 ===
Beth Neilson of New Port Richey, 55, was reported missing from her job on October 15, 1971. Police found a back window forced out at her home, bloodstains throughout the house, and part of her dentures in the driveway. The following day, her burned remains were found in a shallow grave by a fisherman in Columbia County, near the border of Georgia.

On December 29, 1973, the strangled nude body of Wilma Ida Woods, 49, was discovered behind a sand dune in Pasco County, about 100 feet from the highway. She was employed as a bartender on Franklin Street in Tampa's downtown. Woods had been arrested over 100 times, ten of which were in 1973 on charges of open profanity and disorderly conduct. Her last arrest was on December 5, 1973.

On July 10, 1974, a 20-year-old man named John Urbain Vallandry was found with a fatal bullet wound to his head on the side of State Road 581. He had been driving his girlfriend's car before he was murdered. The car was located abandoned at Gene's Lobster House in Madeira Beach. Both Vallandry and his girlfriend were known to be involved in marijuana trafficking.

On January 14, 1975, Betsy Lynn Loden, 22, was discovered on the floor of her garage in New Port Richey's Holiday Garden Estates. She had been bound with surgical tape and placed intentionally near the exhaust pipe of her 1967 Toyota, which caused her to die from carbon monoxide poisoning. Authorities believed she was taped in the kitchen and brought to the garage.

On May 19, the body of Diana Lynn Valleck, 18, was found in a Pasco County orange grove, less than three miles from the location of Woods' body. She was a go-go dancer who had been shot in the head 22 times. Police sought but were not able to find her husband, a sailor from New Orleans, Louisiana, named Frank Michael Valleck III.

On August 21, 1976, the body of Enid Marie Branch, 21, was found in neighboring Hillsborough County on the side of a deserted dirt road. She had been shot several times in the face. Branch left behind a four-year-old son and had been studying refrigerator repair at a Tampa trade school. According to law enforcement, she worked at night as a sex worker.

=== 1977–1978 ===
On April 18, 1977, Mary Jane Burke of St. Petersburg, Florida, 19, was found strangled in an open field near the Dale Mabry Strip. She was known to hitchhike and frequent local bars. In 1976, Burke was raped by a man in a pickup truck while hitchhiking.

On July 17 or 18, the beaten and strangled body of another transient bartender, Jo Ann Parnell, (Note: Some sources name her as "JoAnn") 41, was found on the shoulder of a highway in Pasco County. In October 1972, Parnell was charged with child desertion and had allegedly attempted to sell her son at a bar, though the charges would later be dismissed.

On August 21, 16-year-old Cherylstein Orelia Cherry of Thonotosassa was found strangled and raped in a wooded area in Ybor City. She was a school dropout who frequented local bars. She had no known connection to strip clubs, and unlike most of the other victims, she was African American. Five days later, another African American woman, 18-year-old Patricia Jones, was found alive, fully clothed, at the foot of the Weedon Island Bridge in St. Petersburg. She had been shot three times with a .38 caliber gun and died after telling police that a client had shot her. Jones was a sex worker active on the Dale Mabry Strip.

On September 28, the body of 18-year-old Joan Gail Foster, was found in an orange grove in Pasco County with a gunshot wound to the head, three miles from the location of Parnell's body. She had worked as a nude dancer at the Godmother Lounge in Tampa less than a week before her death. The following day, Molly Kay Newell, 20, was found with a gunshot wound to the head in Pinellas County. The perpetrator had thrown her body off the Gandy Bridge. Twelve days earlier, Newell pleaded guilty to offering to commit prostitution and was sentenced to one day in jail.

On October 21, the body of a motel clerk, Emily Ellen Grieve, 38, was found with a gunshot wound to the back of her head in a field 500 yards from the location of Woods' body. 18 months before her murder, she was in a near-fatal car accident, which left her with a limp and the inability to use her hand. Grieve left behind a 13-year-old son.

Judy Fay Bibee, 18, was found on Thanksgiving Day 1977, near Dade City's dump. She had died hours earlier from numerous "savage" stabbings. Bibee was from North Carolina and had been living with migrant workers near Dade City. Bibee left behind a child and a 4-year-old daughter who lived with relatives.

On December 22, the two hunters who had found Grieve's body two months prior discovered the skeletonized remains of a 26-year-old man named Terry Crew in Zephyrhills. Crew's gray Ford van was found abandoned in an orange grove on November 12, eleven days after he collected his winnings from a bet at the Tampa Dog Track. Crew, a karate expert described as a "wheeler-dealer", was shot in the back of his head while seated in his van. Crew frequently placed bets with a man named "Pooch" or "Poochie", whom police were unable to locate.

The final victim, 20-year-old Cindy Carlton Stewart of Columbus, Georgia (referred to as the "Tattooed Lady" while unidentified), was discovered by a hunter at a lovers' lane on January 15, 1979. Police believed that she was killed approximately ten days earlier at the location where she was discovered.

== Investigation ==
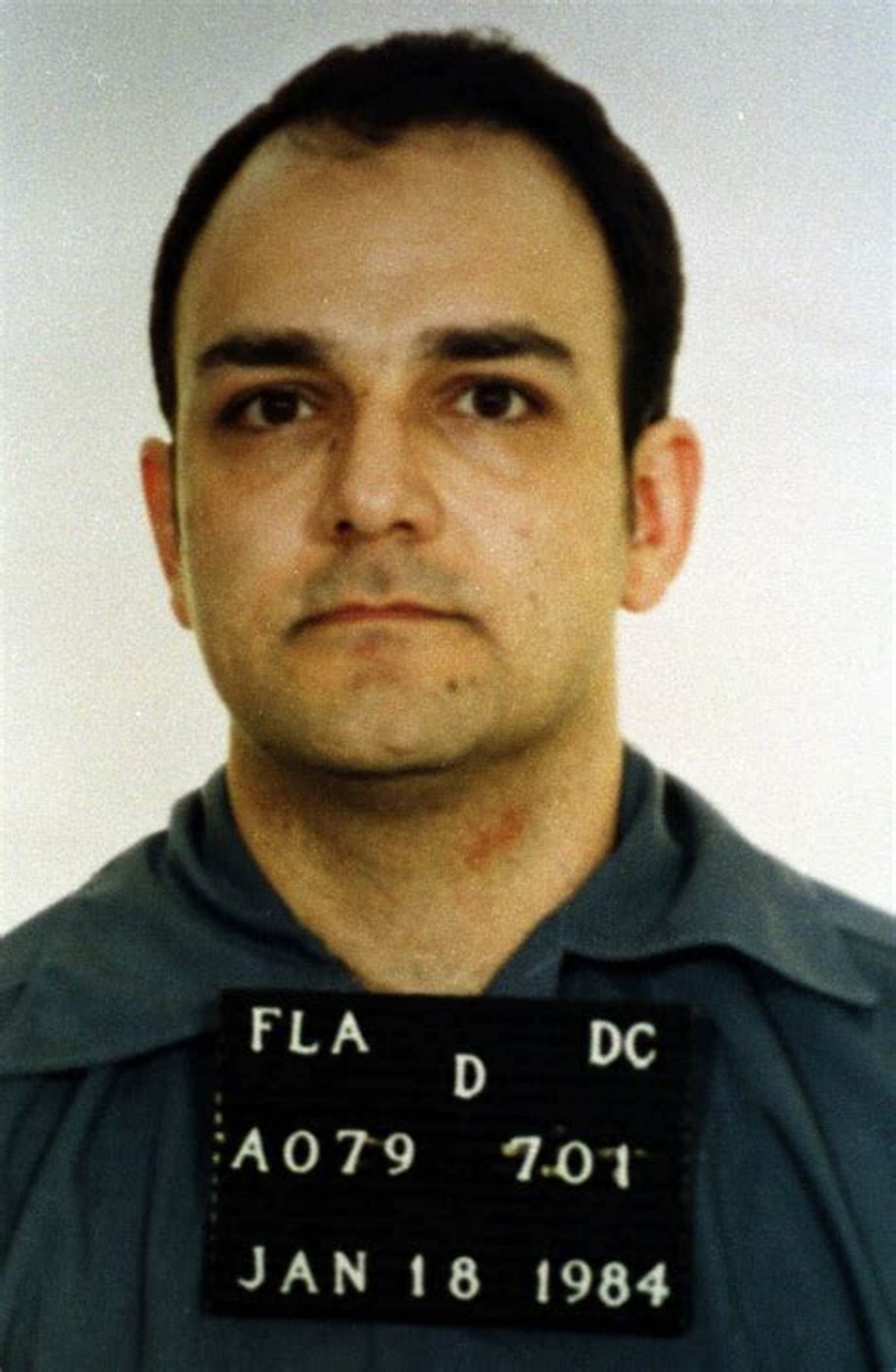
Gerald Stano confessed to four of the murders and later recanted

On October 3, 1977, a special unit of fifteen lawmen from three counties was organized to capture the killer, or killers. From interviews conducted with local sex workers, strippers, and barmaids, it was determined that all of the sex worker victims were single and worked on (or frequented) the Dale Mabry Strip, which at the time was a mile-long row of "bars, adult book stores, strip shows, and X-rated movie houses". Five of the victims were shot in the head with a .22 caliber gun. Three were found nude, and three others were partially nude. Two had been strangled. All of the sex worker victims also had their purses stolen. Police stated that they were killed at undetermined locations and dumped where they were discovered.

Harold Vetter, a local professor of criminology, suspected that the murders could be connected to a "warfare among pimps along the strip" rather than the work of a sexually depraved murderer. Hillsborough County detective Ron Poindexter said of the killings in January 1978: "To say one man did it wouldn't be truthful, and to say the killings are unrelated wouldn't be truthful, we just don't know."

Another death initially considered related to the murders, that of Chicago socialite Eleanor Peters, was later found to have been an accidental drug overdose. Peters was vacationing with friends in Tampa when she collapsed into the bushes near a golf course on September 14, 1977.

=== Suspects ===
On January 12, 1979, Gene Arthur Wirtjes, 44, was sentenced to 25 years in prison for the murder of Jo Ann Parnell. Wirtjes was already serving a one-year sentence in the Hillsborough County Jail for stealing a truck in July 1977. He had killed Parnell to prevent her from testifying in an aggravated battery case involving a stabbing that occurred at a local bar on July 5, 1977.

On April 2, 1980, 23-year-old Robert M. Hardagree was arrested for the murder of Cindy Carlton Stewart. It was determined that Hardagree, Stewart, and a man named Eddie Ray Harvard were drinking heavily on December 31, 1978, and that Hardagree had murdered Stewart after driving her to a swamp. He was found guilty and sentenced to life imprisonment on October 15, 1980.

Convicted serial killer Gerald Stano confessed to the murders of Diana Valleck, Enid Branch, Joan Foster, and Emily Grieve, among 37 others, after his arrest; whether these were false confessions or not is unknown. He later proclaimed his innocence, saying he was forced to make false confessions by the lead investigator.

In 1979, a 28-year-old itinerant laborer named Jerry Frank Townsend was arrested for raping a woman in Downtown Miami. He confessed to a number of murders and was once considered a suspect in the Pasco County killings. However, he was released in June 2001 when it was ruled that Townsend, who had an IQ of 56 and the mental capacity of a 7-year-old, was not involved in the killings and had been pressured to falsely confess.

== See also ==
- List of serial killers in the United States
- South Florida serial murders
