= Star Stowe =

American playboy playmate

- Stowe in 1977

Playboy centerfold appearance
- February 1977
- Preceded by: Susan Kiger
- Succeeded by: Nicki Thomas

Personal details
- Born: Ellen Louise Stowe; March 19, 1956 Little Rock, Arkansas, U.S.
- Died: March 16, 1997 (aged 40) Coral Springs, Florida, U.S.
- Height: 5 ft 6 in (1.68 m)

Star Stowe (born Ellen Louise Price; March 19, 1956, Little Rock, Arkansas – March 16, 1997, Coral Springs, Florida) was an American model. She was Playboy magazine's Playmate of the Month for its February 1977 issue. Stowe was murdered by an unknown assailant.

== Biography ==
Stowe was born Ellen Louise Price (Stowe was her stepfather's last name) on March 19, 1956, in Little Rock, Arkansas and grew up in Arkansas, Louisiana and Nevada. Her father was an engineer. When she was a teenager she moved to Las Vegas and then to Los Angeles, where she worked as a stripper in an adult club.

Stowe chose to call herself "Star" because of her love of the skies and had a blue star tattooed below her bikini line.

She dated Gene Simmons and he sent her photos to Playboy. Her shoot was photographed by Pompeo Posar, and included some pictures with a Rickenbacker bass guitar. The shoot was used as the centerfold in the February 1977 issue, and she was Playmate of the Month. She was the first playmate with a visible tattoo.

Stowe at one time dated Kiss founder and bassist Gene Simmons. As well as taking part in a number of publicity shots for the band, Stowe also appeared on one of the band's picture discs.

Stowe later married and divorced Peter Maligo, with whom she had a son, Michael. Stowe moved to Fort Lauderdale in 1986 to find work as an exotic dancer. When Michael was six she sent him to live with her mother but still stayed in touch with him through phone calls and visits. When this job didn't work out, Stowe eventually fell into prostitution, alcoholism and drug abuse.

In 1991, Stowe moved in with a boyfriend and gave up drugs and prostitution. This lasted until August 1996, when after a drunken argument they split. Stowe went back to her former life on the streets.

== Murder ==
Stowe was last seen working the streets in Fort Lauderdale, Florida, between 3pm and 5pm on March 16, 1997, three days before her 41st birthday. Her body was later found strangled and partially clothed. Police believe that she was picked up, killed and then dumped sometime after 5pm on March 16.

Police linked the murder to that of Sandra Kay Walters, a prostitute who had also been strangled in the same general area of Fort Lauderdale a few weeks earlier on February 25. When Tammy Strunk was found murdered in November 1997 police believed the deaths might be the work of a serial killer. This theory was strengthened when several other prostitutes in the area were subsequently strangled and dumped in a similar manner. Her murder remains unsolved.

== See also ==
- List of Playboy Playmates of the Month
- List of unsolved murders (1980–1999)

Susan Kiger	Star Stowe	Nicki Thomas	Lisa Sohm	Sheila Mullen	Virve Reid
Sondra Theodore	Julia Lyndon	Debra Jo Fondren	Kristine Winder	Rita Lee	Ashley Cox
