= Robin Greer =

American actress (born 1960)

- Born: May 27, 1960 (age 66); Los Angeles, California, U.S.
- Occupations: Actress, Author
- Years active: 1977-1997

Robin Greer is an American actress, noted for her roles in television soap operas.

She played Sydney Price in the daytime series Ryan's Hope before switching to prime time to play Dina Wells in Falcon Crest.

Greer co-authored The Hollywood Handbook: The Insiders' Guide to Success with Sarah Reinhardt and Kevin Dornan. The book was published in September 1997 and is a guide to surviving in Hollywood, with advice on trends, career choices, lingo and places to meet celebrities.

Greer was close friends with Nicole Brown Simpson, ex-wife of O. J. Simpson. She was among those who participated in the 2016 documentary O.J.: Made In America.

== Filmography ==
Year	Title	Role	Notes
1977	Satan's Cheerleaders	Baker Girl	
1978	Goodbye, Franklin High	Mark's Girlfriend	
1979	Angels Revenge	Policewoman Elaine Brenner	
1990	Lakers Girls	Marsha	
1992	Man Trouble	Actress	
