= Death Screams =

1982 American slasher film by David Nelson

- Theatrical poster
- Directed by: David Nelson
- Written by: Paul C. Elliott
- Produced by: Charles Ison; Ernest Bouskos
- Starring: Susan Kiger; Andria Savio; Kurt Rector; Jennifer Chase; John Kohler; Jody Kay; Martin Tucker; William T. Hicks
- Cinematography: Darrell Cathcart
- Edited by: Jerry Whittington
- Music by: Dee Barton
- Distributed by: United Film Distributors
- Release date: May 21, 1982 (Fort Worth, Texas)
- Running time: 88 minutes
- Country: United States
- Language: English

Death Screams (also titled House of Death and Night Screams) is a 1982 American slasher film directed by David Nelson. The film stars Susan Kiger, Andria Savio, Kurt Rector, Jennifer Chase, John Kohler, Jody Kay, Martin Tucker and William T. Hicks and follows a group of teenagers who party by a stream on the last night of the carnival before discovering they are being stalked and murdered by an unknown killer.

== Plot ==
In a small Southern town, couple Ted and Angie are brutally murdered while having sex down by the riverfront, and their bodies are thrown into the water.

Several days later, Bob and Kathy, both young college students home for summer vacation, make plans to attend the traveling carnival on its last night. Later, Lily Carpenter, a local grocery clerk at a local grocery store, feels she is being followed as she walks home. The next day, Lily visits the carnival with her grandmother Agnes, as do Bob and Kathy. Also in attendance are Sheila, a young coed named Walker, a waitress named Ramona and her boyfriend, Tom; and prankster Diddle and his girlfriend, Sandy. Together, the group make plans to have a bonfire near the river that night.

During the carnival, Neil Marshall, a local coach whom Bob and Kathy work for, makes romantic advances toward Lily. When his jealous ex-girlfriend Sara witnesses this, she covers Neil's car in shaving cream. Shortly after, while sitting alone in an unpopulated part of the carnival, she is shot with an arrow, and stumbles to an abandoned carousel, where an assailant suffocates her to death with a plastic bag.

At nightfall, Lily drops off Bob and Kathy at their homes, and they convince her to meet them later at the river for the planned bonfire. Ramona arrives at Neil's house and makes sexual advances toward him, but he rebukes her. She leaves in tears, and is confronted by the local sheriff, Avery, who denigrates her and blames her for a car accident she was in that resulted in his son, Casey, sustaining a brain injury that left the boy intellectually disabled. Shortly after, Avery's wife phones him and tells him Casey has run away from home.

Neil prepares to leave for the bonfire, but hears noises in the attic above his garage. Shortly after, Avery arrives at Neil's house and finds the garage covered in blood before a corpse falls from the rafters. Meanwhile, at the bonfire, Sandy decides to go swimming alone in the river while Ramona and Tom begin making out. While floating in the water, the corpses of Ted and Angie drift into Sandy, and her throat is subsequently slashed by the killer. Soon after, Bob, Kathy, and Lily arrive at the bonfire, and the group all decide to visit the local cemetery, a short distance away through the woods. The group begin to tell scary stories, but are interrupted by a rainstorm.

Seeking shelter, the group break into a nearby abandoned house. Diddle ventures outside to use an outhouse, and the group plan to scare him. After waiting several minutes, they barge into the outhouse, but find his bloody corpse hanging from the ceiling. Walker rushes to retrieve his truck, only to be decapitated by the killer upon arriving at the vehicle; Sheila, having followed Walker, meets the same fate shortly after. Tom finds their severed heads, and falls victim to the killer moments later in the cemetery. Lily, Kathy, Bob, and Ramona are soon attacked by the killer, who breaks into the house. As they try to flee upstairs, Ramona falls through the broken staircase and is murdered. The killer, revealed to be Neil, bursts into the attic. He attempts to attack Lily, but she manages to stop him by slashing his throat with a shard of broken glass. Neil falls, but stands up again and charges madly forward in the direction of a large window.

Sheriff Avery—having earlier discovered his son Casey's body in Neil's garage—arrives at the abandoned house, and watches as Neil crashes through the attic window. Avery shoots Neil multiple times in the head, avenging his son. Multiple police arrive on the scene to save Lily, Bob, and Kathy. Meanwhile, the corpses of Angie, Ted, and Sandy float in the river against the edge of a dam.

== Cast ==
- Susan Kiger as Lily Carpenter
- Larry Sprinkle as Ted
- Andria Savio as Kathy
- David Lenthall as Jackson
- Martin Tucker as Coach Neil Marshall
- William T. Hicks as Sheriff Avery
- John Kohler as Diddle
- Jennifer Chase as Ramona
- Jody Kay as Sandy
- Kurt Rector as Bob
- Josh Gamble as Tom
- Hanns Manship as Casey
- Helene Tryon as Edna Sharpe
- Mary Fran Lyman as Agnes Bottomly
- Mike Brown as Walker
- Monica Boston as Sheila
- Sharon Alley as Sara
- Penny Miller as Angie Maloney
- Bill Ison as Arch Johnson
- Gail Minton as Brenda
- R.C. Nanney as R.C.

== Production ==
Filming took place in Shelby, North Carolina.

== Release ==
=== Critical reception ===
AllMovie called the film "bland early '80s slasher fare".

=== Home media ===
The film was released on VHS under the alternate title House of Death on September 6, 1989, by Virgin Vision home video. In 2021, Arrow Films released it on a limited edition Blu-ray.

== Sources ==
- Albright, Brian (2012). Regional Horror Films, 1958-1990: A State-by-State Guide with Interviews. Jefferson, North Carolina: McFarland. ISBN 978-1-476-60042-0.
