= Indiana County–Jimmy Stewart Airport =

Airport in Pennsylvania, US

Coordinates: 40°37′56″N 079°06′20″W

Indiana County–Jimmy Stewart Airport Indiana County Airport (Jimmy Stewart Field)
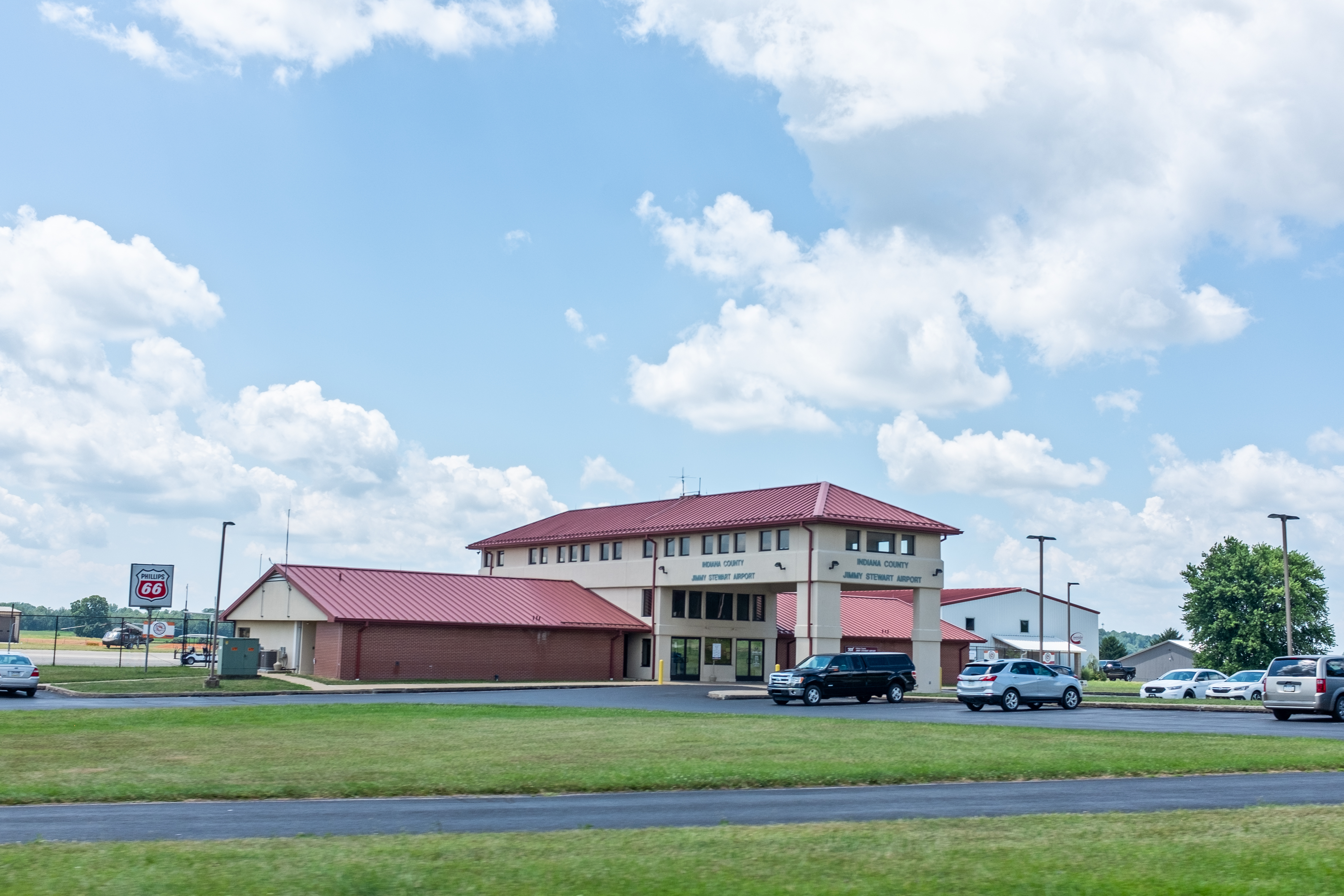
- IATA: IDI; ICAO: KIDI; FAA LID: IDI

Summary
- Airport type: Public
- Owner: Indiana County, Pennsylvania
- Location: Indiana, Pennsylvania
- Elevation AMSL: 1,405 ft (428 m)
- Website: www.JimmyStewartAirport.com

Map
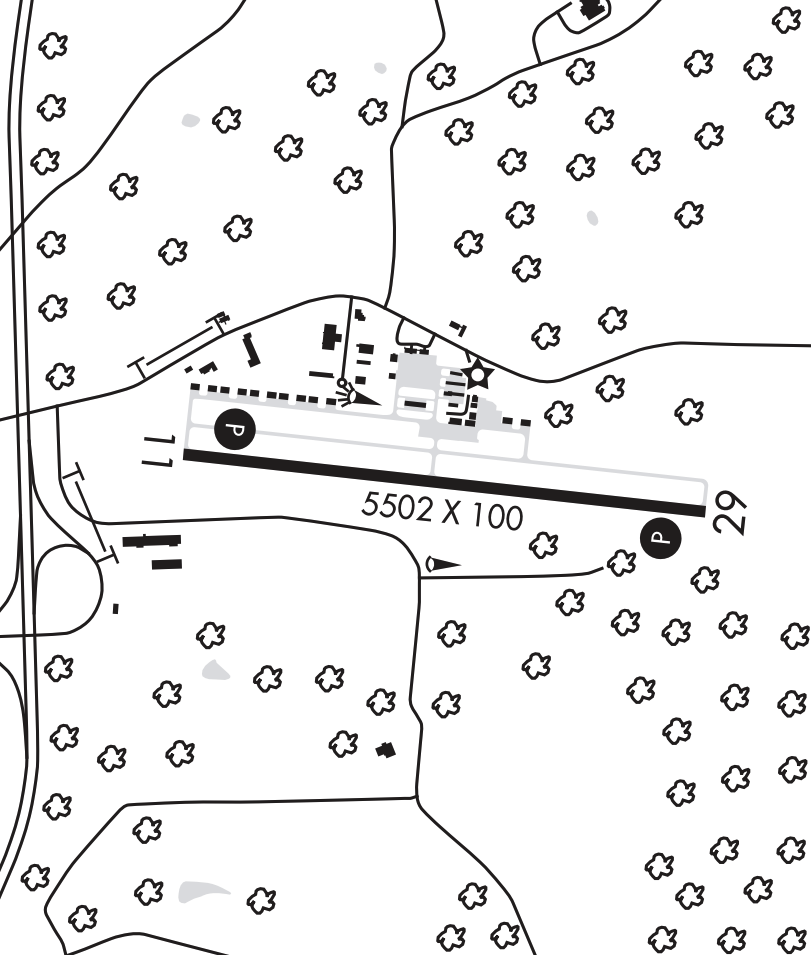
- FAA airport diagram

Runways
| Direction | Length | | Surface |
| Direction | ft | m | Surface |
|---|---|---|---|
| 11/29 | 5,500 | 1,677 | Asphalt |

Statistics (2007)
- Aircraft operations: 26,100
- Based aircraft: 45
- Source: FAA and airport web site

Indiana County–Jimmy Stewart Airport (IATA: IDI, ICAO: KIDI, FAA LID: IDI) (Indiana County Airport or Jimmy Stewart Field) is a county-owned public airport two miles (3 km) east of the borough of Indiana, in White Township, Indiana County, Pennsylvania. The airport is about 65 miles (105 km) northeast of Pittsburgh and is in the Pittsburgh Combined Statistical Area. It is classified as a business service airport by the Pennsylvania Bureau of Aviation.

The airport was named after silver-screen legend Jimmy Stewart, who hails from Indiana, Pennsylvania.

== Facilities ==
The airport covers 276 acres (112 ha) and has one asphalt runway, 11/29, 5,500 x 100 ft. The runway has medium intensity runway lighting (MIRL). The airport has three nonprecision approaches (LOC RWY 28, GPS 10, GPS 28).

In the year ending March 31, 2007, the airport had 26,100 aircraft operations, average 71 per day: 95% general aviation, 3% military and 2% air taxi. 45 aircraft are based at the airport: 89% single-engine, 9% multi-engine and 2% ultralight.

The Indiana County Airport Authority has received approval and funding for a new 5500 x 100 ft runway and will allow the installation of an instrument landing system (ILS). The old runway will become a parallel taxiway.

== See also ==
- List of airports in Pennsylvania
