= Pamela Bryant =

American model and actress (1959–2010)

Pamela Jean Bryant

Playboy centerfold appearance
- April 1978
- Preceded by: Christina Smith
- Succeeded by: Kathryn Morrison

Personal details
- Born: February 8, 1959; Indianapolis, Indiana
- Died: December 4, 2010 (aged 51)
- Height: 5 ft 5 in (1.65 m)

Pamela Jean Bryant (February 8, 1959 – December 4, 2010) was an American model and actress. She was Playboy magazine's Playmate of the Month for its April 1978 issue. Her centerfold was photographed by Richard Fegley.

Bryant first appeared in Playboy in the September 1977 pictorial "The Girls of the Big Ten". (She was attending Indiana University Bloomington at the time). She went on to have an extensive acting career, appearing in films such as H.O.T.S. (1979), Don't Answer the Phone (1980) and Private Lessons (1981). Bryant also appeared on television series such as The Dukes of Hazzard, Magnum, P.I., Fantasy Island and The Love Boat.

She worked as an artist before her death from an asthma attack.

== See also ==
- List of people in Playboy 1970–1979

Debra Jensen	Janis Schmitt	Christina Smith	Pamela Bryant	Kathryn Morrison	Gail Stanton
Karen Morton	Vicki Witt	Rosanne Katon	Marcy Hanson	Monique St. Pierre	Janet Quist
