= Melissa Brasselle =

American actress

- Born: Melissa Maria Brasselle; 27 January 1965 (age 61); The Bronx, New York, U.S.
- Other names: Rocky DeMarco, Raquel DeMarco
- Occupation: Actress
- Years active: 1994–present
- Relatives: Keefe Brasselle (father) Arlene DeMarco (mother)

Melissa Brasselle is an American actress best known for frequently working with the director Jim Wynorski. Brasselle featured in 23 Wynorski films.

== Early life ==
Brasselle was born in The Bronx on January 27, 1965 to actor Keefe Brasselle and singer Arlene DeMarco of The DeMarco Sisters. She has an older sister who was born in 1964. She has Italian heritage on her mother's side. She got her nickname "Rocky" from her friends due to her toughness and resilience. Her parents divorced when she was 2, and she never got to get close to her father. Her father died in 1981 at the age of 58. She had a great singing voice, and she was selected for the New York All-City Chorus.

== Career ==
Brasselle first rose to fame when she featured in Playboy's 1989 February edition. She would go on to become one of the most notorious actresses in the horror and action genres. She stated that her favourite film was The Sound of Music. Her first film appearance was in the 1994 erotic thriller Possessed by the Night. Brasselle starred alongside former child actor Corey Haim in Demolition High, where she played the protagonist Tanya who is trying to steal a missile from a military base. Brasselle also starred in the 2001 American horror film Raptor. Brasselle's most recent movie was Big Foot Burgers in 2026.

== Personal life ==
Brasselle dated George Clooney for an unknown period of time. She also dated stuntman Rob Sanchez for a short period of time. Together, they have a daughter named Hayley; she was born in 1998.

== Filmography ==
=== Film ===
- Big Foot Burgers (2026)
- Cocaine Cougar (2023)
- Murderbot (2023)
- Cobra Strike Force (2023)
- Lisa: Warden from Hell (2022)
- Bigfoot or Bust (2022)
- Camel Spiders (2011)
- Lost in the Woods (2009)
- Vampire in Vegas (2009)
- The Lusty Busty Babe-a-que (2008)
- Curse of the Komodo (2004)
- Treasure Hunt (2003)
- Bad Bizness (2003)
- Cheerleader Massacre (2003)
- Raptor (2001)
- Thy Neighbor's Wife (2001)
- Ablaze (2001)
- Black Scorpion (2001)
- Rangers (2000)
- Agent Red (2000)
- Desert Thunder (1998)
- Storm Trooper (1998)
- The Assault (1998)
- Loved (1997)
- The Bold and the Beautiful (1996)
- Demolition High (1996)
- Body Chemistry IV: Full Exposure (1995)
- The Wasp Woman (1995)
- Sorceress (1995)
- Tales from the Crypt (1994)
- Cyborg 3: The Recycler (1994)
- Munchie Strikes Back (1994)
- Possessed by the Night (1994)
