= Piranhaconda =

- DVD cover
- Written by: Mike MacLean
- Directed by: Jim Wynorski
- Starring: Michael Madsen; Rib Hillis; Rachel Hunter
- Country of origin: United States
- Original language: English

Production
- Producer: Forest King
- Running time: 85 minutes

Original release
- Network: Syfy
- Release: June 16, 2012

Piranhaconda is an American science fiction horror B-movie film premiered on June 16, 2012, on the Syfy Channel. It is directed by Jim Wynorski, produced by Forest King and stars Michael Madsen, Rib Hillis, Rachel Hunter and Terri Ivens.

== Plot ==
On a Hawaiian island, Professor Lovegrove and a group of scientists are researching eggs that belong to two gigantic piranha/anaconda hybrids. However, one of the snakes kills all of the scientists except for Lovegrove, who escapes into the jungle. Meanwhile, a film crew on the island is in the middle of filming a slasher movie. Several crew members wander off and are killed by the snakes before director Milo, lead actress Kimmy Weston, scriptwriter Rose, her stuntman boyfriend Jack, and pyrotech expert Gunner are captured by a group of criminals led by Pike and his girlfriend Talia, and held for ransom in an abandoned mill, along with Lovegrove, whom the criminals had discovered wandering the jungle. Jack, and Gunner escape and systematically take out a few of the criminals before placing Gunner's explosives around the mill as a diversion to rescue the hostages. During the escape, Milo steals a gun and stays behind as a distraction so the others can escape.

The group reaches a car, but a giant green piranhaconda soon arrives and kills Talia. Gunner detonates the explosives, only to be killed by a stray bullet moments later. Jack, Rose, Lovegrove, and Kimmy drive off, and are chased by Pike until they encounter one of the giant snakes on the road. Pike shoots an anti-tank rocket at the car, but Jack swerves off the road, causing the missile to hit the snake instead, blowing off its lower jaw. The larger yellow snake arrives, drawn by the blood, and kills the smaller one in a frenzy. The fugitives soon run out of gas and try to reach a nearby marina. Meanwhile, Milo escapes the mill and encounters a girl whose fiancée was previously killed by the snake. They stumble upon its nest, where the girl starts destroying the eggs, angering the snake when it returns and eats them.

At the marina, the fugitives find a working boat, but Jack plans to kill the remaining snake by luring it into the explosive-filled car. However, the criminals soon arrive. Another green snake does too, killing all of the criminals, including Pike. Kimmy runs inside the car to get the detonator for the explosives, but the snake kills her before she can activate it. An injured Jack has Rose and Lovegrove escape on the boat while he stays behind to distract the snake. On the boat, Rose discovers that Lovegrove is in possession of an egg belonging to the snake, which is why it is chasing them.

As the snake pursues them underwater, Rose pushes Lovegrove off the boat, and he is eaten. She reaches land, and reunites with Jack, who attaches an explosive to the egg container before they lure the yellow snake over to a waterfall, throwing the container into its mouth before the explosive detonates, killing it. Jack and Rose escape and share a final kiss. During their kiss, a second snake suddenly eats them both, killing them and bringing the movie to an end.

== Cast ==
- Michael Madsen as Professor Lovegrove
- Rib Hillis as Jack
- Michael Swan as Pike
- Rachel Hunter as Talia
- Terri Ivens as Rose
- Shandi Finnessey as Kimmy Weston
- Chris De Christopher as Milo
- Kurt Yaeger as Gunner
- Christina DeRosa as Rachel
- Syd Wilder as Vicky

== Production ==
The film was written by Mike MacLean, who had written Dinocroc vs. Supergator and a number of scripts for Roger Corman. Corman hired him to write the film.

MacLean said: "I learned from Roger that a cable movie is a different animal than a theatrical release. First and foremost, cable movies must be faster-paced. With a theatrical release, the audience has driven to the mall, bought a ticket, and fought the crowds for a seat. They've made an investment in the viewing experience, so they're not walking out on the film if it's pacing is a bit leisurely. A cable movie audience has the remote within reach... So you have to keep things moving, which means showing the creature soon and often".

MacLean added that "these films must have an element of comedic irony... the effects still can't compete with the big studio blockbusters. So there has to be a comedic undercurrent to the story. Audiences are more likely to accept a less-than-realistic effect if they know they're laughing with the filmmakers".

== Reception ==
The film generally negative reviews.

== See also ==
- List of natural horror films#Snakes
- List of Sci Fi Pictures original films
- In Nessie & Me, the character Jack O'Grady mentions the Dinocroc/Supergator and the Piranhaconda when he encounters Nessie at the beginning of the movie. However, those three films are not related to the first one.
