= Wolfhound (2002 film) =

- Directed by: Donovan Kelly; Jim Wynorski
- Release date: 2002
- Country: United States
- Language: English

Wolfhound is a 2002 American erotic thriller film directed by Donovan Kelly and Jim Wynorski. It was shot in Ireland.

== Cast ==
- Allen Scotti as Colum Kennedy
- Jennifer Courtney as Stella Kennedy
- Julie Cialini as Siobhan
- Brian Monahan as Macroth
- Samantha Keaveney as Sally Kennedy
- Jack Dunne as Michael Kennedy
- Fiona Kelly as Moira
- Conor Nolan as Fergal
- Little John Nee as Bob
- Maria Tecce as Clare
- David Flynn as Finn
- Julie K. Smith as Fantasy Woman (uncredited)
- Regina Russell Banali as Fantasy Woman (uncredited)

== See also ==
- List of American films of 2002
