= The Hills Have Thighs =

2010 television film directed by Jim Wynorski

- Based on: The Hills Have Eyes by Wes Craven
- Written by: Jim Wynorski
- Directed by: Jim Wynorski
- Starring: Julie K. Smith; Rebecca Love; Frankie Cullen; Mark Weiler; Brandin Rackley; Kylee Nash; Paul Sterling; Dana Bentley; Glori-Anne Gilbert; Diana Terranova
- Theme music composer: Al Kaplan; Jon Kaplan
- Country of origin: United States
- Original language: English

Production
- Producer: J.D. Beverage
- Cinematography: Franco N. Ciccio
- Editor: H.G. Andrei Smyslov
- Running time: 76 minutes
- Production companies: People By The Pound; Oh boy, Foods! Inc.

Original release
- Release: March 6, 2010

The Hills Have Thighs is a 2010 American made for cable erotic film written and directed by Jim Wynorski under the pseudonym Salvadore Ross. It is based on the 1977 horror feature The Hills Have Eyes written and directed by Wes Craven.

== Plot ==
Linda and Mark find each other in the south Texas hill country. Being alone in the hills, they get to know one another and continue to explore each other as well as the surrounding country.

== Cast ==
- Julie K. Smith as Linda
- Rebecca Love as Mira
- Brandin Rackley as Sandy
- Glori-Anne Gilbert as Glori-Anne
- Kylee Nash as Tara
- Dana Bentley as Mark
- Diana Terranova as Tanya
- Frankie Cullen as Ben
- Mark Weiler as Mike
- Paul Sterling as Bill

== Production ==
The film was produced by the production companies People By The Pound and Oh boy, Foods! Inc.

== Release ==
It was broadcast several times in Spring and Summer 2010 at fixed times and on demand on the premium channels HBO and Showtime. James Cromer, a former South Carolina state representative, sued both HBO and Showtime when they promoted the film as his work but instead broadcast Wynorski's film.
