= Sorceress II: The Temptress =

- Directed by: Richard Styles
- Written by: Richard Styles
- Starring: Julie Strain
- Cinematography: Gary Graver
- Production company: Sunset Films International
- Distributed by: Multicom Entertainment Group
- Release date: March 23, 1996
- Running time: 122 minutes
- Country: USA
- Language: English

Sorceress II: The Temptress is a 1996 erotic horror film directed by Richard Styles. It was presented as a sequel to Sorceress. Luke the 1995 film, featured Julie Strain in the main role; in fact, it was unrelated to the first film in terms of plot and characters. The film was poorly received.

== Plot ==
A brood of women practicing black magic try to lure a man into their sexual escapades in order to steal his soul.

== Cast ==
- Julie Strain as Tara Coventry
- Greg Wrangler as Paul Stevens
- Sandahl Bergman as Virginia
- Julie K. Smith as Katlin
- Jenna Bair as Noella
- Lynn Daly as Rachel
- Christian Noble as Deacon
- John Henry Richardson as Dr. Condon
- Michael Andrews as Bob
- Vinnie Ceceliano as Sarah
- Beth Richards as Janet Stevens
- Marshal Hilton as Zoran
- Michael Jay as Sean O'Grady
- Katherine Ann McGregor as Maryanna
- Jim Wynorski as Agent In Car

== Production ==
The film was written and directed by Richard Styles. This is unlike its predecessor, which was directed by Jim Wynorski. However, it is still credited as "[a] Jim Wynorski Production"; Wynorski himself even makes a brief appearance in the film. Actress Julie Strain plays a villainous role in both films, but hers is an entirely different character than in the first film. It also re-uses Julie Strain’s opening footage from the previous film, where she is performing a magical ritual while wearing a see-through robe. Despite the title, the story has indeed no connection to the original film. TV Guide sums the convenient shift as follows: "Under the guise of a cosmetics company CEO, the powerful witch from Sorceress (1995) with the killer looks and a new identity, Tara Coventry, picks up where she left off."

"The video success of Sorceress has prompted the inevitable" sequel, noted Femme Fatales in 1995, adding: "Shooting is scheduled for May on a slave plantation in northern Florida." Strain's scenes were wrapped by April 1996.

== Release and reception ==
In the United Kingdom, it was titled Legion of Evil: Sorceress II.

The film was first released in 1996.

The film is less well-known than its predecessor, which has been considered by some as a cult film. AllMovie's Mark Deming awarded the film two out of five stars.
