= Victim of Desire =

- Directed by: Jim Wynorski
- Written by: William C. Martell
- Produced by: Andrew Stevens
- Starring: Marc Singer; Shannon Tweed
- Production company: Concorde-New Horizons
- Release date: 1995
- Country: United States
- Language: English

Victim of Desire, also known as Implicated, is a 1995 American erotic thriller film directed by Jim Wynorski and starring Marc Singer and Shannon Tweed.

Wynorski who said it was one of the few films in his career he regretted making (the other being Vampirella.) He says he was asked to do the project by the producer Andrew Stevens who was a friend. Wynorski had trouble making sense of the script, as did Stevens, but was told to film it anyway.

== Cast ==
- Marc Singer as Peter Starky
- Shannon Tweed as Carla Duvall
- Julie Strain as Linda Hammond
- Johnny Williams as Marvin "Marv" Riker
- Wings Hauser as Leland Duvall
- Burton Gilliam as Lynch
- Jay Richardson as Richard

== See also ==
- List of American films of 1995
