= Virtual Desire =

- Directed by: Jim Wynorski (as Noble Henri); Fred Olen Ray (uncredited)
- Written by: Pete Slate
- Produced by: Jim Wynorski (as Tom Popatopolous); Alan B. Bursteen (executive producer, as Alan Bursteen)
- Starring: Mike Meyer; Ross Hagen; Gail Harris; Julie Strain; Lorissa McComas; Shanna McCullough
- Cinematography: Gary Graver
- Edited by: Stephen Eckelberry
- Music by: Leo Nichols
- Production companies: Midnight Kiss Productions; Royal Oaks Entertainment Inc.
- Distributed by: Triboro Entertainment Group; Image Entertainment (United States, 1999, DVD)
- Release date: 1995
- Running time: 94 minutes
- Country: United States
- Language: English

Virtual Desire is a 1995 American erotic thriller film directed by Jim Wynorski and starring Mike Meyer, Ross Hagen, Gail Harris and Julie Strain.

== Cast ==
- Mike Meyer as Brad
- Ross Hagen as Crank / Detective Crank
- Julie Strain as Sascha
- Gail Harris as Wendy
- Tammy Parks as Susan
- Lorissa McComas as Julie
- Shanna McCullough as Stranger (credited as Marcia Gray)
- Catherine Weber as Molly
- Taylor St. Clair as Taylor
- Peggy Trentini as Beth
- Hoke Howell as Archer
- Annette Burger as Cora

== Production ==
According to Fred Olen Ray, Jim Wynorski left the film before it was completed in order to make The Wasp Woman. Ray said he would film footage of Ross Hagen for this movie and for Star Hunter at the same time. He said the films contain identical scenes involving the police.
