= Lorissa McComas =

American actress

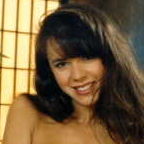
- Lorissa McComas in the 1990s
- Born: Lorissa Deanna McComas; November 26, 1970; Columbus, Ohio
- Died: November 3, 2009 (aged 38); Waverly, Virginia
- Height: 5 ft 4 in (1.63 m)
- Children: 1

Lorissa Deanna McComas (November 26, 1970 – November 3, 2009) was an American actress, film producer and glamour model.

== Biography ==
McComas studied ballet as a child and graduated from Princeton High School in Sharonville, Ohio in 1988. She became an Education major at Miami University before she started stripping and modeling.

McComas built a successful strip-O-gram service in Cincinnati, Ohio after college. In 1990 she was arrested, along with another stripper, on charges of prostitution by Hamilton County police: she had allowed a guest at a bachelor party to tuck a dollar bill into a garter just above her knee; this was treated as a form of prostitution under the very strict Cincinnati ordinances of that time.

She was featured in hundreds of magazines and calendars since her first Playboy magazine modeling job, starting in 1991. By 1994, she was the owner of Extasy Entertainment, a company that provided strippers to clients in the Cincinnati area. Cincinnati had no strip bars during this time period.

The majority of her work consisted both in nude modeling and co-starring in a variety of softcore erotic films in addition to supporting roles in B-movies and TV programs.

McComas died on November 3, 2009, in Waverly, Virginia.

== Filmography ==
- Project Viper (2003)
- Raptor (2001) - Lola Tanner, Sheriff Jim Tanner's daughter
- The Bare Wench Project (2000) - Lori
- Hot Boyz (1999) - Roxanne
- Sinful Intrigue (1995) - Jean
- Piranha (1995) remake of the 1978 film
- Virtual Desire (1995) - Julie
- Red Lips (1995) - girl in hotel in white hot-pants
- Stormswept (1995) - Kelly
- Lap Dancing (1995) - Angie Parker
