= Active Stealth =

- DVD cover
- Directed by: Fred Olen Ray
- Written by: Steve Latshaw
- Produced by: Jim Wynorski
- Starring: Daniel Baldwin; Fred Williamson
- Production company: Phoenician Entertainment
- Release date: July 11, 1999
- Running time: 99 minutes
- Country: United States
- Language: English

Active Stealth is a 1999 American action film directed by Fred Olen Ray and starring Daniel Baldwin, Paul Michael Robinson, Joe Lala and Tim Abell.

== Premise ==
Captain Murphy, an American fighter pilot, is sent on a mission to Mexico by his commanding officer General Reynolds to combat drug dealer Salvatore and free hostages he holds. Murphy uses an airplane with experimental stealth technology. When he arrives, Murphy finds he has been set up and the plan is to give Salvatore the new plane.

== Cast ==
- Daniel Baldwin as Captain Murphy
- Hannes Jaenicke as Lieutenant "Rif" Rifkin
- Lisa Vidal as Maria
- Chick Vennera as Chiccio
- Tim Abell as Lieutenant Rab Carter
- Paul Michael Robinson as Lieutenant "Hollywood" Andrews
- Joe Lala as Salvatore
- Terry Funk as Morgan
- Shannon Whirry as Gina Murphy
- Ladd York as Sergeant Phillips
- Darcas Macopson as Lieutenant Randall (credited as Dwayne Macopson)
- Andrew Stevens as Captain Jack Stevens
- Fred Williamson as Captain Reynolds
- Carlos Cantu as Colonel Juarez
- Ava Fabian as Sergeant Baker
- Romeo Fabian as Jorge (credited as Romeo Rene Fabian)
- Ernest Hardin Jr. as Banner
- Rick Montana as Wilson
- Kimberly A. Ray as Mona (credited as Kim Ray)
- Marc Vahanian as Davis
- Ric Drasin as Drug Runner

== Reception ==
The film received poor reviews. Radio Times scored it 1/5. TV Guide scored it 2/5, finding it predictable but praising the action scenes and aerial photography. Apollo Guide rated it 25/100, criticising the slow pace and lack of plot, though noting that the makers had the decency to release it straight to video. Prisma also rated it 2/5.
