= Nessie & Me =

Nessie and Me
- DVD poster
- Directed by: Jim Wynorski
- Written by: Jim Wynorski; Carl Salminen
- Produced by: Joe Gaudin
- Starring: Michael Paré; John Henry Richardson; Walker Mintz; Jolie Ledford
- Cinematography: Chuck Cirino; Erick M. Crespo
- Edited by: Tony Randel
- Music by: Chuck Cirino
- Production company: Vision Films
- Release date: October 18, 2016
- Running time: 90 minutes
- Country: USA
- Language: English

Nessie & Me is a 2016 American adventure comedy-drama film directed by Jim Wynorski starring John Henry Richardson, Walker Mintz, Jolie Ledford, and Michael Paré. Nessie & Me is in a shared universe with Wynorski's 2010 film Monster Cruise due to a good portion of that film's cast returning to their roles for this film.

== Plot ==
A 9-year-old boy moves to a lakeside village and befriends a captain who claims a mythical sea creature named Nessie lives in their peaceful waters. When Nessie proves to be real, the boy embarks on a special mission to save the town from corporate villain Maxwell Gordon and prove that anything is possible if you just believe.

== Cast ==
- John Henry Richardson as Captain Jack O'Grady
- Walker Mintz as Jamie Williams
- Jolie Ledford as Janelle Delacort
- Michael Paré as Tom, Dad
- Toni Hudson as Mom
- Paul Wallace as Larry
- Shay Dickerhoff as Izzy
- Erin Neufer as Ariel
- Kayla Gill as Tamara
- Corey Landis as James Grady
- Stacey Dixon as "Kitty"
- Hugo Gerth as Alfie
- Gerard Pauwels as Maxwell Gordon
- Jason Smither as Alphonse
- David DeSpain as Tony "Caput"
- Ervin Ross as Marve
- Jim O'Rear as Boris
- Dilan Patton as "Bobbo"
- Jonathan Tysor as Evan Kincaid
- Jordan Besana as Ronnie Alika
- Dennis Crosswhite as Mason
- Cindy Lucas as The Secretary
- Matt Borges as GPS Delivery Guy
- Freddy John James as Bobbo's Dad
- Brian C. Lauziere as Video Customer
- Rick Shedd as Fisherman
- Bryan Clark as Lawyer's Assistant

== See also ==
- The monsters from the following films are mentioned by the character Jack O'Grady when he encounters Nessie early in the movie. Those movies are not related to this film.
  - Dinocroc
  - Supergator
  - Dinocroc vs. Supergator
  - Piranhaconda
- Monster Cruise - the characters Larry, Izzy, Tamara, Ariel, Kitty, Boris, Marve, Alphonse, and Tony Caput also appeared in this film directed by Jim Wynorski, with their respective actors and actresses reprising their roles in Nessie & Me.
