= Matt McCoy (actor) =

American actor

- Born: May 20, 1958 (age 68); Austin, Texas, U.S.
- Occupation: Actor
- Years active: 1979–present
- Spouse: Mary McCoy (m. 1985)
- Children: 3

Matt McCoy (born May 20, 1958) is an American actor. His credits include L.A. Confidential as Brett Chase, The Hand that Rocks the Cradle as Michael Bartel, Police Academy 5: Assignment Miami Beach and Police Academy 6: City Under Siege as Sgt. Nick Lassard, DeepStar Six as Jim Richardson, and Seinfeld as Lloyd Braun.

== Early life ==
McCoy was born in Austin, Texas. He grew up in Bethesda, Maryland, and attended Walter Johnson High School, graduating in 1974. McCoy briefly attended University of Maryland, College Park. He worked briefly at the Harlequin Dinner Theater in Rockville. McCoy began acting when he appeared in two plays in the student-directed one act festival: Winners by Brian Friel, and Footsteps of Doves by Robert Anderson. Moving to New York City, he graduated from Neighborhood Playhouse School of the Theatre in 1979.

== Career ==
Since starring as Sgt. Nick Lassard in Police Academy 5: Assignment Miami Beach (1988) and Police Academy 6: City Under Siege (1989), his motion picture credits have included White Wolves: A Cry in the Wild II (1993), the Curtis Hanson films The Hand That Rocks the Cradle (1992) and L.A. Confidential (1997), as well as the action comedy National Security (2003) alongside Martin Lawrence and Steve Zahn.

He has worked regularly on television. His credits include starring in the sitcom We Got It Made, and guest appearances on The Love Boat; Murder, She Wrote; Star Trek: The Next Generation; The Golden Girls; The Nanny; L.A. Law; Melrose Place; NYPD Blue; Chicago Hope; Sabrina, the Teenage Witch; Six Feet Under; The West Wing; Carnivàle; CSI: NY; Silicon Valley; True Detective; Studio 60 on the Sunset Strip; Reba; and Huff. He played Lloyd Braun in two episodes of Seinfeld. He appeared in three Bigfoot-themed movies: Bigfoot: The Unforgettable Encounter (1994), Little Bigfoot (1997), and Abominable (2006).

In 2014, McCoy began appearing as a spokesperson in commercials for The Hartford Insurance Company, identified as a customer on the "compensated endorser" principle. He once again appeared as a spokesperson in The Hartford commercials in 2019, these commercials directed toward AARP members; and in 2021, he was joined by his real-life wife Mary for at least one ad.

== Filmography ==
=== Film ===
Year	Title	Role	Notes
1985	Fraternity Vacation	J.C. Springer	Low-budget sex comedy
1986	Weekend Warriors	Ames	Alternative title: Hollywood Air Force
1988	Police Academy 5: Assignment Miami Beach	Sgt. Nick Lassard	Comedy crime film
1989	Police Academy 6: City Under Siege	Sgt. Nick Lassard	Comedy crime film
1989	DeepStar Six	Engineer Jim Richardson	Science fiction horror
1992	The Hand That Rocks the Cradle	Michael Bartel	Psychological thriller
1992	Eyes of the Beholder	Frank Carlyle	Thriller horror mystery film
1993	Snapdragon	Bernie	
1993	Wind Dancer	Jim McDonald	
1993	White Wolves: A Cry in the Wild II	Jake (Mr. B)	Action-adventure film
1993	Lightning in a Bottle	Troy Hoskins	
1993	Samurai Cowboy	Colt Wingate	Western film
1994	The Cool Surface	Chazz Stone	
1994	Hard Drive	Jack	Thriller film
1994	Dead On	Ted Beaumont	
1994	The Soft Kill	Vinnie Lupino	Thriller, mystery film
1994	In the Heat of Passion II: Unfaithful	Steven	
1994	Bigfoot: The Unforgettable Encounter	Nick	
1995	Hard Bounty	Kanning aka Holy Ghost	
1995	In the Flesh	Derek Mitchelson	Thriller
1995	Rent-a-Kid	Russ Syracuse	Comedy film
1995	Memory Run	Gabriel	Video
1996	Fast Money	Jack Martin	Action comedy film
1996	Sticks & Stones	Joey's Dad	Drama film
1996	The Assault	Mike	Action thriller film
1997	L.A. Confidential	Brett Chase	Neo-noir crime film
1997	The Apocalypse	Suarez	
1997	Little Bigfoot	Sheriff Cliffton	Family film
1997	Fire Mountain: The Eruption and Rebirth of Mount St. Helens	Narrator	Video
1998	Nightmare in Big Sky	Joe	Drama film
1999	Monsoon	Olivier Labelle	
1999	Buck and the Magic Bracelet	Natty	Action-adventure western film
1999	Mutual Love Life	Don	Short film
1999	Can't Be Heaven	Mike	Family comedy
1999	Passport to Paris	Jack Porter	Video
2000	The Newcomers	Gary Docherty	Family drama
2000	Rangers	Broughten	Video
2001	Beethoven's 4th	Reginald Sedgewick	Video
2003	National Security	Robert Barton	Action comedy film
2004	Radius	Crim	
2005	Rebound	Alumni Association Member #2	Comedy film
2006	Abominable	Preston Rogers	Horror film
2006	A Merry Little Christmas	Norbert Bridges	
2011	Born to Race	Joe	Video
2013	The Trouble Man	Kent Freedman	Short film
2014	Act of Contrition	Fr. Boyle	Short film
2015	Memoria	Harry Goodman	
2016	The 5th Ward	News Reporter	Drama thriller film
2021	The Ice Road	George Sickle	Action film
2022	Hostile Territory	Andrew Lee	
2022	Bobcat Moretti	Dr. Shaw	
2023	Underwater Upside Down	Mr. Sheraton	
2024	Micro Budget	Franklin	

=== Television ===
Year	Title	Role	Notes
1979	Hot Hero Sandwich	Himself	Variety series
1981	Pen 'n' Inc.	Alan Ozley	Made-for-TV movie
1983–1984	We Got It Made	David Tucker	Contract role (22 episodes)
1984	The Love Boat	Billy Boy Bodine	Episode: "Country Blues/A Matter of Taste/Frat Brothers Forever" (S 8:Ep 14)
1986	Dream West	Louis Freniere	Miniseries
1986	We're Puttin' on the Ritz	Max Montana	Made-for-TV-movie
1987	American Harvest	Tad	Made-for-TV-movie
1988	Murder, She Wrote	Todd Wendle	Episode: "Mourning Among the Wisterias" (S 4:Ep 15)
1989	Star Trek: The Next Generation	Devinoni Ral	Episode: "The Price" (S 3:Ep 8)
1989	The Golden Girls	Father Avery	Episode: "Have Yourself a Very Little Christmas" (S 5:Ep 12)
1990	Miracle Landing	Doug Torbel	Made-for-TV-movie; Also known as Panic in the Open Sky
1990	Archie: To Riverdale and Back Again	Robert Miller	Released on video as Archie: Return to Riverdale in the U.S. and Archie's Weekend Reunion in Australia
1990	Babes	Merit	Episode: "Marlene's Problem" (S 1:Ep 8)
1991	Nurses	Dr. Harold Miller	Episodes: "Son of a Pilot" (S 1:Ep 1), "Mother, Jugs, and Zach" (S 1:Ep 6)
1992	Civil Wars	David Willert	Episode: "Mob Psychology" (S 1:Ep 16)
1993	L.A. Law	Rick Turner	Episode: "Eli's Gumming" (S 8:Ep 8)
1994	The Nanny	Steve Mintz	Episode: "A Plot for Nanny" (S 1:Ep 11)
1994	Melrose Place	D.A. Quinton Benson	Episode: "With This Ball and Chain" (S 2: Ep22)
1995–1997	Seinfeld	Lloyd Braun	Episodes: "The Gum", "The Serenity Now"
1996	My Son Is Innocent	David Harbin	Made-for-TV-movie
1997	The Accident: A Moment of Truth Movie	Ray Williams	Made-for-TV-movie
1997	Men Behaving Badly	Jack Brickman	Episode: "No Retreat, No Surrender" (S 2"Ep 1)
1998	Grace Under Fire	Jack	Episode: "Grace Under Class" (S 5:Ep 13)
1999	Partners	John	Episode: "Always..." (S 1:Ep 5)
1999	Dangerous Waters	Bob	Made-for-TV-movie
1999	NYPD Blue	Trent Knox	Episode: "Mister Roberts" (S 6:Ep 18)
1999	Chicago Hope	Jeremy Hofmeister	Episode: "Kiss of Death" (S 5:Ep 22)
1999	Odd Man Out	Dave	Episode: "Little Women" (S 1:Ep 11)
2000	Ladies Man	Ben Carlson	Episode: "Breaking Up Really Isn't So Hard to Do" (S 1:Ep 15)
2000	Alley Cats Strike	Mr. Kevin Thompson	Made-for-TV-movie
2000	Profiler	Patrick Hutton	Episode: "Tsuris" (S 4:Ep 20)
2001	Three Sisters	Dr. Fenmore	Episode: "My Birth and Welcome to It" (S 1:Ep 2)
2001	Sabrina, the Teenage Witch	Calvin	Episode: "Love Is a Many Complicated Thing" (S 5:Ep 15)
2001	Six Feet Under	Slick Funeral Director	Episode: "Life's Too Short" (S 1:Ep 9)
2001	Citizen Baines	Arthur Croland	Contract role
2003	The West Wing	Congressman Tom Landis	Episode: "Angel Maintenance" (S 4:Ep 19)
2003–2005	Carnivàle	Councilman Ned Munson	Recurring role
2005–2006	Huff	Dr. Bernbaum	Recurring role
2005	CSI: NY	Martin Benson	Episode: "Supply & Demand" (S 1:Ep 20)
2006	Reba	Dr. Castleman	Episode: "Red Alert" (S 5:Ep 20)
2007	Studio 60 on the Sunset Strip	Russell	Episode: "K&R: Part 2" (S 1:Ep 20)
2007	Big Love	Dick Paulson	Episode: "The Happiest Girl" (S 2: Ep 10)
2008	Without a Trace	Judge Victor Morgan	Episode: "22 x 42" (S 7:Ep 2)
2009	Saving Grace	Keith	Episode: "Watch Siggybaby Burn" (S 3:Ep 3)
2011	The Closer	Kevin Adams	Episode: "An Ugly Game" (S 6:Ep 15)
2012	The Mentalist	Principal Snyder	Episode: "Something Rotten in Redmund" (S 4:Ep 20)
2012	Touch	Lamont	Episode: "Lost & Found" (S 1:Ep 6)
2012	Revenge	Lyle Jameson (voice)	Episode: "Absolution" (S 1:Ep 19)
2013	CSI: Crime Scene Investigation	Simon Weber	Episode: "Double Fault" (S 13:Ep 12)
2015	The Whispers	Graham Pillstein	Episode: "X Marks the Spot" (S 1:Ep 1)
2015	True Detective	Gillett	Episode: "Other Lives" (S 2:Ep 5)
2015–2017	Silicon Valley	Pete Monahan	4 episodes
2016	NCIS	Senator Thomas Bransfield	Episode: "Charade" (S 13:Ep 20)
2016	Transparent	Dr. Benoit Segal	2 episodes
2016	Masters of Sex	Arnold Ketterman	Episode: "Outliers"
2017	Ballers	Dolphins Owner	2 episodes
2017	There's... Johnny!	Father Mike	Episode: "Take Me to Church"
2018	Liza on Demand	Clay Coburn	Episode: "Simpler Times"
2018	Jack Ryan	Dr. Nadler	4 episodes
2020	Your Honor	Daniel Armfield	Episode: "Part Four" (S 1:Ep 4)
2021	Grey's Anatomy	Sam Nichols	Episode: "I'm Still Standing"
2022–2023	The Mosquito Coast	JJ Raban	6 episodes
2024	The Good Doctor	Scott	Episode: "Who at Peace" (S 7: Ep 5)
