= Chick Vennera =

American actor (1947–2021)

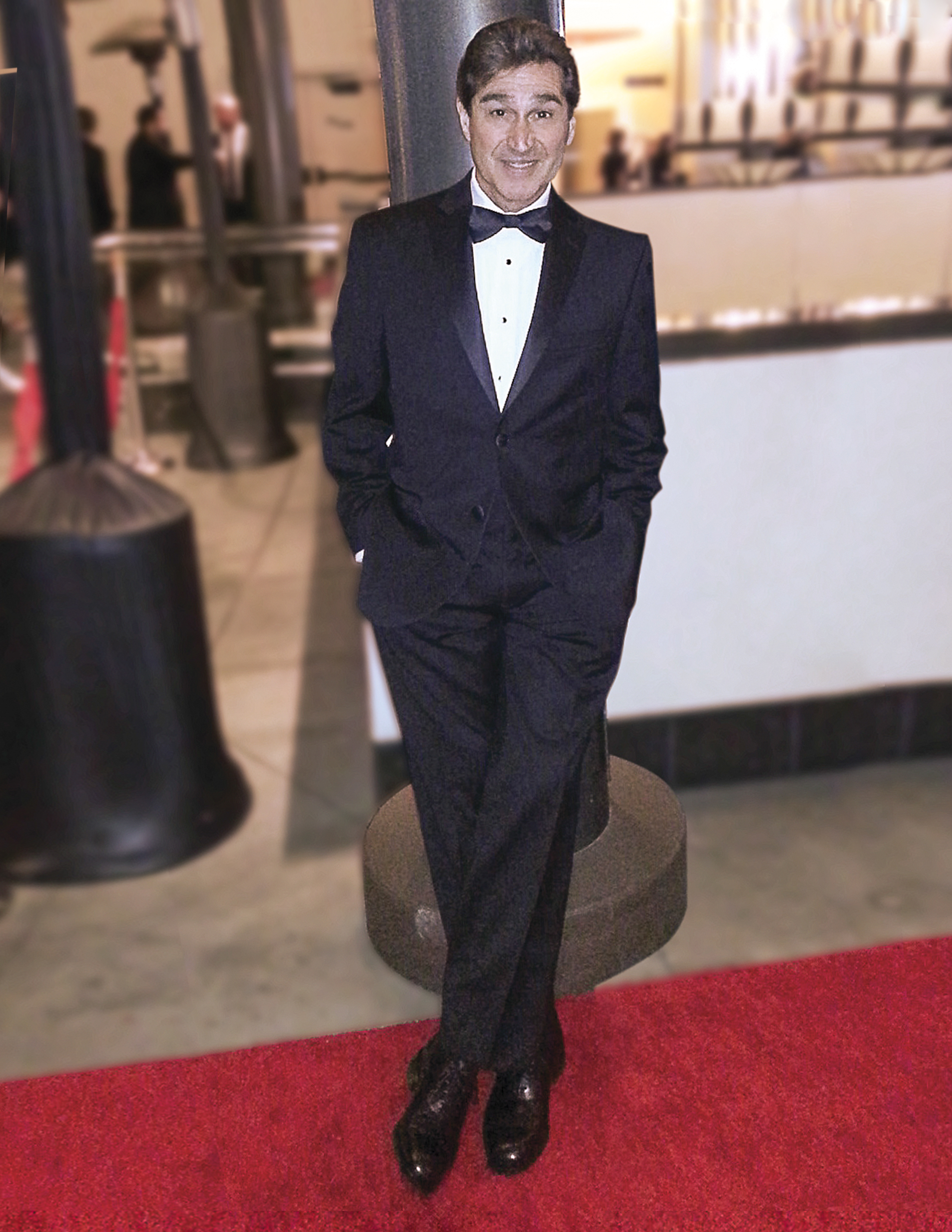
- Vennera at the 2013 DGA Awards
- Born: Francis Vincent Vennera; March 27, 1947; Herkimer, New York, U.S.
- Died: July 7, 2021 (aged 74); Burbank, California, U.S.
- Occupation: Actor
- Years active: 1975–2011
- Spouses: Joanne Mary Divito (m. 1971; div. 1982) Suzanne E. Messbauer (m. 1983)
- Children: 2

Francis Vincent Vennera (March 27, 1947 – July 7, 2021) was an American actor, known for his role as Joe Mondragon for Robert Redford's The Milagro Beanfield War (1988), among other movies. Vennera voiced Pesto the pigeon for the animated show Animaniacs. He also often served as a voice double for actor Joe Pesci.

== Acting ==
Vennera served with the U.S. Army during the Vietnam War, first in the Signal Corps and later in the Special Services division. Afterwards, he began a career as an actor and dancer. He was also a musician, playing several instruments. Vennera's first acting role of note was in the Broadway production of Grease, having toured with the musical for a year. He continued working as a performer, and appeared in the 1978 film Thank God It's Friday, where he performed a dance routine atop several cars. In 1979, Vennera appeared as Vietnam War veteran Mitch Costigian in three episodes of Vega$, along with Robert Urich. His acting career continued throughout the 1980s and 1990s, appearing in many films and television series, most notably for his role as Joe Mondragon for Robert Redford's The Milagro Beanfield War (1988). Perhaps most memorably, in 1989, he appeared in three episodes of The Golden Girls, two of them as the character Enrique Mas and the other as Kid Pepe.

Vennera also began doing voice acting during the 1980s, with roles on Hanna-Barbera programs. However, his most notable role was Pesto in Warner Bros. Animation/Amblin Entertainment's animated series Animaniacs. Prior to his death, Vennera also taught acting.

== Personal life ==
Vennera died from cancer at his home in Burbank, California, on July 7, 2021, at the age of 74.

== Selected filmography ==
Film
Year	Title	Role	Notes
1978	Thank God It's Friday	Marvin "Marv" Gomez	
1979	Yanks	Sergeant Danny Ruffelo	
1981	High Risk	Tony	
1985	A Bunny's Tale	Frankie	TV movie
1987	Kidnapped		
1988	Last Rites	Nuzo	
1988	The Milagro Beanfield War	Joe Mondragon	
1991	The Terror Within II	Kyle	
1991	McBain	Roberto Santos	
1997	Time Under Fire	Spitz	
1999	Wakko's Wish	Pesto	Voice, direct-to-video
1999	Final Voyage	Dennis	
2000	Intrepid	Ellerson	
2001	Air Rage	Fishman	
2005	Glass Trap	Paolo	

Television
Year	Title	Role	Notes
1978–1980	Vega$	Mitch Costigian	3 episodes
1985	The Jetsons	Additional Voices	
1986–1987	Foofur	Sam	Voice, 16 episodes
1986	Diff'rent Strokes	"Spider"	
1989	The Golden Girls	Pepe, Enrique	3 episodes
1992	Batman: The Animated Series	Twitch	Voice, episode: "Off Balance"
1993	Bonkers	Chick	Voice, 2 episodes
1993–1998	Animaniacs	Pesto, Godpigeon, Joe Pesci	Voice, 22 episodes
1996–1997	The Real Adventures of Jonny Quest	Various Voices	Voice, 9 episodes
1998	JAG	Benny Turpin	2 episodes
1998	Cow and Chicken	Salesman	Voice, episode: "Free Inside!"
2000	That's Life	Luciano	
2000	Batman Beyond	Chauffeur	Voice, episode: "Ace in the Hole"
2002–2004	Static Shock	Ferret	Voice, 3 episodes

Video games
Year	Title	Voice role
1997	Zork: Grand Inquisitor	Hades Beast, House Alarm
1998	Animaniacs: Ten Pin Alley	Pesto, Godpigeon
2009	Bayonetta	Enzo
