= Warren Munson =

American film and television actor (born 1933)

- Born: November 30, 1933 (age 92); Schenectady, New York, U.S.
- Occupations: Actor, voice actor
- Years active: 1966–2005; 2022–present

Warren Munson (born November 30, 1933) is an American film and television actor.

== Career ==
Munson's likeness and voice were used to portray Admiral Owen Paris in two early episodes of Star Trek: Voyager. He also played the role of Vice Admiral Marcus Holt in the Star Trek: The Next Generation seventh season episode "Interface".

On television, Munson played the recurring character of Dr. Richard London in the soap opera Port Charles. He also had guest roles as a doctor in seven other productions including the recurring role of Dr. Thompson in Father Murphy.

On film, Munson most recently appeared in the 2003 movie Down with Love (with Jeri Ryan, Michael Ensign, Jude Ciccolella, and Diana R. Lupo). Other recent films in which he has appeared are Beautiful (with Michael McKean, Jessica Collins, Jordan Lund, Spice Williams, and Nikita Ager), Intrepid (with Robert Bauer, Kevin Rahm, and Clive Revill), and California Myth (with Bibi Besch and Don Stark). In the 1989 movie Friday the 13th Part VIII: Jason Takes Manhattan, Munson played another admiral opposite Peter Mark Richman.

Munson also appeared in the television movie Childhood Sweetheart? (with Michael Reilly Burke, Ed Lauter, Leon Russom, Barbara Babcock, Ronny Cox, Stephanie Erb, Derek Webster, and Buck McDancer).

== Filmography ==
=== Film ===
Year	Title	Role	Notes
1971	The Steagle	Man on Train	
1973	The Thief Who Came to Dinner	Frank	Uncredited
1979	The Bermuda Triangle	Carpenter	
1980	First Family	Justice Beatrice Barstow	
1981	Heavy Metal	Senator	
1981	Carbon Copy	2nd Guard	
1981	Mommie Dearest	Lawyer	
1982	Some Kind of Hero	Bank President	
1986	Big Trouble	Jack	
1989	Friday the 13th Part VIII: Jason Takes Manhattan	Admiral Robertson	
1993	A Dangerous Woman	Gately	
1993	Bank Robber	Bank Manager	
1993	Ed and His Dead Mother	Uncle Bill	
1995	Raging Angels	Harlin	
1996	Executive Decision	Ambassador Donaldson	
1999	California Myth	Mr. Bernstein	
2000	Intrepid	General Moss	
2000	Beautiful	Judge	
2003	Down with Love	C.B.	

=== Television ===
Year	Title	Role	Notes
1966	The Farmer's Daughter	M.C.	Episode: "Alias Katy Morley"
1966	The Big Valley	Man	Episode: "Hide the Children"
1967	Daniel Boone	Cpl. Tompkins	Episode: "The Traitor"
1969	Here Come the Brides	Bartender	Episode: "The Crimpers"
1975	Adam-12	Ernie Samson	Episode: "Pressure Point"
1975	S.W.A.T.	Doctor	Episode: "Jungle War"
1976	The Blue Knight	Hudson	Episode: "A Slower Beat"
1976	Rich Man, Poor Man	Photographer	Episode: "Part VII: Chapter 10"
1976	Spencer's Pilots	Dave Collins	Episode: "The Code"
1977	The Mary Tyler Moore Show	Sommelier	Episode: "The Critic"
1977	The Rockford Files	Hotel Clerk	Episode: "The Becker Connection"
1977	Mary Jane Harper Cried Last Night	Mr. Ovest	Television film
1977	The Hardy Boys/Nancy Drew Mysteries	Controller	Episode: "The Strange Fate of Flight 608"
1977	What's Happening!!	Mr. Collins	Episode: "The Testimonial"
1978	Devil Dog: The Hound of Hell	Superintendent	Television film
1978	The Phantom of the Open Hearth	Junie Jo's Father	Television film
1979	Fantasy Island	Wheeler Dealer #2	Episode: "Seance/The Treasure"
1979	Delta House	Mr. Hoover	Episode: "Parent's Day"
1979, 1981	Eight Is Enough	Principal / Park Director	2 episodes
1980	Valentine Magic on Love Island	Coach	Television film
1980	From Here to Eternity	Fessbinder	Episode: "Pearl Harbor"
1980	Taxi	Customer #1	Episode: "Fantasy Borough: Part 1"
1980	The Scarlett O'Hara War	Bill Menzies	Television film
1980	The Dukes of Hazzard	Doc Carney	Episode: "The Late J.D. Hogg"
1980	Benson	Leon J. Whitley	Episode: "First Lady"
1980, 1981	Dallas	The Judge	2 episodes
1980–1983	Quincy, M.E.	Various roles	3 episodes
1981	Murder in Texas	Atkins	Television film
1981	One Day at a Time	Gilbert Reed	Episode: "Snake Hands"
1981	Bosom Buddies	The Desk Sergeant	Episode: "One for You, One for Me"
1981	Barney Miller	James Seinbeck / John Norvis	2 episodes
1981, 1982	CHiPs	Judge / Sandy	2 episodes
1981–1983	Father Murphy	Dr. Thompson	10 episodes
1982	The Ambush Murders	Judge Liebman	Television film
1982	The Greatest American Hero	Engineer	Episode: "Train of Thought"
1982	Hart to Hart	Mr. Wilbur	Episode: "The Harts Strike Out"
1982	No Soap, Radio	Commercial Doctor	2 episodes
1983	Wizards and Warriors	Peasant	Episode: "Skies of Death"
1983	Emergency Room	Fire Chief	Television film
1983	Oh Madeline	Elderbody	Episode: "Madeline Acts Forward at the Retreat"
1983	Happy Endings	Constantine Lawyer	Television film
1983, 1984	Hotel	Harlan Hendrix / Mr. Brenner	2 episodes
1984	Too Close for Comfort	Father O'Grady	Episode: "Home Is Where the Bart Is"
1984	Family Ties	Fred Lambert	Episode: "Keaton and Son"
1984, 1985	Knots Landing	Walt Clifton	2 episodes
1984–1985	Falcon Crest	Dr. Frank Shratter / Mr. Glasser	2 episodes
1985	Otherworld	Dr. Scorpus Klaxon	Episode: "Rock and Roll Suicide"
1985	Cheers	John Parker	Episode: "The Executive's Executioner"
1985	Airwolf	Secretary Dunlap	Episode: "Airwolf II"
1985	It's a Living	Mr. Gruber	Episode: "Desperate Hours"
1985	The Love Boat	Edgar Fairchild	Episode: "Roommates/Heartbreaker/Out of the Blue"
1985	Misfits of Science	Murcho	Episode: "Twin Engines"
1986	Dynasty	Judge Stanley Thurlowe	2 episodes
1986	Shadow Chasers	Dr. Bidwell	Episode: "Blood and Magnolias"
1987	1st & Ten	Det. Munson	Episode: "The Bulls Change Hands"
1987, 1989	CBS Summer Playhouse	Harry Nesbite / Gordon Purcell	2 episodes
1989	Beauty and the Beast	Willis	Episode: "Sticks and Stones"
1989	Amityville Horror: The Evil Escapes	Doctor	Television film
1989	Paradise	Henderson	8 episodes
1990	Perfect Strangers	J.R. Stanhouse	Episode: "The Selling of Mypos"
1990	Hunter	Judge Beckworth	Episode: "Final Confession"
1990–1991	L.A. Law	Judge Matthew Saucier	4 episodes
1991	Top of the Heap	Minister	Episode: "The Marrying Guy"
1991	The New Lassie	Howard Hoff	Episode: "Lassie P.I."
1991	Murphy Brown	Mr. Arnold	Episode: "Love Is Blonde"
1992	Hearts Are Wild	Alexander Barnes	Television film
1992	Growing Pains	Mr. Erhardt	Episode: "Vicious Cycle"
1992	The Golden Girls	Frank	Episode: "Journey to the Center of Attention"
1992	Hearts Afire	Mr. Bukowski	Episode: "Everyday's a Holiday"
1993	Star Trek: The Next Generation	Adm. Marcus Holt	Episode: "Interface"
1994	Love & War	Howard	Episode: "Buddy, Can You Spare a Dime?"
1994	Cries Unheard: The Donna Yaklich Story	Priest	Television film
1994	The Mommies	Father O'Leary	Episode: "Valentine's Day"
1994	Renegade	Mayor	Episode: "Sheriff Reno"
1994	Amelia Earhart: The Final Flight	President Elliot	Television film
1994	Roswell	Yellow Hat Vet	Television film
1994	Good Advice	Gus	Episode: "A Chance of Showers"
1994	Melrose Place	Judge	Episode: "The Doctor Who Rocks the Cradle"
1995	Sisters	Nit Gangrene	Episode: "Word of Honor"
1995, 1998	Star Trek: Voyager	Admiral Paris	2 episodes
1995	Platypus Man	Justice of the Peace	Episode: "Without a Hitch"
1995	From the Mixed-Up Files of Mrs. Basil E. Frankweiler	Mr. Jordan	Television film
1996	Campus Cops	Gallopin' Joe	Episode: "Muskrat Ramble"
1996	Forgotten Sins	Judge Beatty	Television film
1996	Cybill	Gene	Episode: "Romancing the Crone"
1996	Something So Right	Mr. Pappas	Episode: "Something About Schmoozing"
1998	Two Guys and a Girl	Dave Ryecart	Episode: "Two Guys, a Girl and Oxford"
1999	The Young Indiana Jones Chronicles	Ambassador	Episode: "Hollywood Follies"
1999	Linc's	Rev. Standing	Episode: "15 Seconds of Fame"
2000	The Young and the Restless	Justice of the Peace	3 episodes
2002	Nikki	Proctor	Episode: "GED off My Back"
2003	Dragnet	Uncle Perry	Episode: "The Cutting of the Swath"
2004	Scrubs	Mr. Taylor	Episode: "My Screw Up"
2005	Las Vegas	Mr. Socal	Episode: "The Lie is Cast"
2022	Coroner's Report	John Robertson	Episode: "John Robertson"
