= Intrepid (film) =

- Directed by: John Putch
- Written by: Keoni Waxman
- Produced by: Jim Wynorski
- Starring: James Coburn; Costas Mandylor; Finola Hughes; Larry Poindexter; Chick Vennera; David Kaufman; Blake Clark; Robert Bauer; Julie McCullough; Kevin Rahm; Michael Dean Jacobs; Johnny Martin; Warren Munson
- Cinematography: James Mathers
- Music by: Alexander Baker; Clair Marlo
- Production companies: Phoenician Entertainment; Flip Ship Films Inc.
- Distributed by: 20th Century Fox Home Entertainment
- Release date: 2000
- Running time: 90 minutes
- Country: United States
- Language: English

Intrepid, also known as Deep Water, is a 2000 action film directed by John Putch, written by Keoni Waxman (under the name Darby Black) and produced by Jim Wynorski. This film stars James Coburn, Costas Mandylor, Finola Hughes, Blake Clark, Julie McCullough, and Kevin Rahm.

== Cast ==
- James Coburn as Captain Hal Josephson
- Costas Mandylor as Alan Decker
- Finola Hughes as Katherine Jessel
- Alex Hyde-White as Colin
- Larry Poindexter as First Officer "Lazo" Lazaro
- Sonia Satra as Sabrina Masters
- Chick Vennera as Ellerson
- David Kaufman as Max Dennis
- Blake Clark as Wayne
- Robert Bauer as Mr. Clarence
- Julie McCullough as Shannon
- Brandon Maggart as The Bronco
- Kevin Rahm as Steward Beck
- Carol Arthur as Marcia Lowell
- Michael Dean Jacobs as Mickey
- Johnny Martin as Ernest
- Clive Revill as Rupert Masters
- David Packer as George
- Warren Munson as General Moss
- Michael Tylo as Tony Hersh
