= Glenn Plummer =

American actor

- Born: August 18, 1961 (age 65); Richmond, California, U.S.
- Occupation: Actor
- Years active: 1987–present
- Spouse: DeMonica Santiago (m. 2000; div. 2014)
- Children: 2

Glenn E. Plummer (born August 18, 1961) is an American film and television actor.

Plummer starred as Bobby "Badass" Johnson in the 1992 film South Central,. He also appeared as James Smith in Paul Verhoeven's 1995 Showgirls, Maurice in Speed and its sequel, cameraman Ned Jackson in Up Close & Personal, Luther in The Day After Tomorrow. On television, he appeared as Desk Clerk Timmy Rawlins in ER, Russ Stanhope in Dick Wolf's 1990 Nasty Boys series, and Vic Trammel in the 2008–2009 show Sons of Anarchy.

== Early life ==
Plummer was born in Richmond, California.

== Career ==
Glenn Plummer has appeared in numerous films and television series. He portrayed the role "High Top" in Dennis Hopper's 1988 film Colors, and Timmy Rawlins partially in season 1 and again in season 13 of ER. In 2021, Plummer headlined the Iybe Media drama Black Lies.

Plummer's prominent roles came in the films Menace II Society (as Pernell), Speed (as Jaguar Owner), the TV series Bones (ep The Woman In the Tunnel, as Harold Overmeyer), Showgirls, South Central, Roland Emmerichs' The Day After Tomorrow (as Luther), The Salton Sea (as Bobby), and Saw II (as Jonas).

Glenn Plummer was nominated for the Independent Spirit Award for Best Supporting Male for his 1991 performance in Pastime.

In 2014 Plummer produced and became collaborating writer of the horror thriller film Teeth and Blood.

In 2024 Glenn Plummer starred in Mahal Empire Productions' Bikers vs. Werewolves, a comedy-action film co-starring William Connor, Elizabeth Chamberlain, and Robert Donovan, which was successfully crowdfunded by Michael and Sonny Mahal and shot primarily in rural Nevada.

== Filmography ==
=== Film ===
Year	Title	Role	Notes
1987	Who's That Girl	Harlem Kid #1	
1988	Hearts of Stone	Tigo Loc	Short
1988	Colors	Clarence "High Top" Brown	
1988	Funny Farm	Mickey	
1989	84C MoPic	Radio Voice	
1990	Downtown	Valentine	
1990	Pastime	Tyrone DeBray	
1991	Wedlock	Teal	
1991	Frankie and Johnny	Peter	
1992	South Central	Bobby "Badass" Johnson	
1992	Trespass	Luther	
1993	Menace II Society	Pernell	
1993	Dangerous Game	Burns' Buddy	
1994	There's No Place Like Homegirl	Wesley	
1994	Speed	Maurice	
1995	Things to Do in Denver When You're Dead	"Baby Sinister"	
1995	Strange Days	Jeriko "One"	
1995	Showgirls	James Smith	
1995	Beyond the Edge	Henry	
1996	The Destiny of Marty Fine	Mikie	
1996	Up Close & Personal	Ned Jackson	
1996	The Substitute	Mr. Darrell Sherman	
1996	Psalms from the Underground	–	Short
1996	Small Time	Ben	
1997	Speed 2: Cruise Control	Maurice	
1997	One Night Stand	George	
1997	Tear It Down	Nathan	
1998	The Heist	Dipper	
1998	Thursday	"Ice"	
1998	A House Divided	William	Short
1999	Spy Games	Dave Preston	
1999	Interceptors	Russell	
2000	Love Beat the Hell Outta Me	Glenn	
2000	Rangers	Shannon	Video
2001	MacArthur Park	Leo	
2001	Knight Club	"T-Dog"	
2001	Deadly Rhapsody	Roughneck	
2001	100 Kilos	Ricky "Freeway Ricky" Ross	Video
2002	The Salton Sea	Bobby	
2002	Poolhall Junkies	Chico	
2002	Go for Broke	Ramses	
2003	Last Night with Angel	Jay Summers	Short
2003	Shade	Gas Station Attendant	
2003	Road Dogs	Panther	
2003	Baadasssss!	Angry Brother	
2003	Gang of Roses	Johnny "Handsome"	
2004	Lexie	Norman	Video
2004	The Day After Tomorrow	Luther	
2004	Roscoe's House of Chicken 'n Waffles	Clyde Coltrane	Video
2004	Sugar Valentine	Cutty	
2005	Constellation	Man At Barbeque	
2005	Go for Broke 2	Ramses	
2005	Brothers in Arms	Curly	
2005	Saw II	Jonas	
2006	VooDoo Curse: The Giddeh	Professor Jenkins	
2006	El Cortez	Jack Clay	
2006	It Ain't Easy	–	Video
2007	Vegas Vampires	Eddie Patterson	
2008	The Longshots	Winston	
2009	Joshua's Soul	James Evans	Short
2009	Janky Promoters	Officer Ronnie Stixx	
2010	Ca$h	Glenn, The Plumber	
2011	Measure of Faith	Ronald	Video
2011	Showgirls 2: Penny's from Heaven	James "Jimmy" Smith	
2012	Monsters in the Woods	Jayson	
2013	Winnerz	Kirb	
2014	Imperial Dreams	Uncle Shrimp	
2014	The Other Side	Simon	
2014	10 Minutes	Samuel	Short
2015	Teeth and Blood	Vincent Augustine	
2016	The Sweet Life	Earl	
2016	Home	Todd	Short
2016	90 Minutes of the Fever	Clarence McGee Sr.	
2017	Frank	Security Guard	Short
2017	Pope	"Big K"	
2017	Gifted	Greg Cullen	
2017	Men of God	Pastor Ford	Short
2018	Muslimah's Guide to Marriage	Bilal Ali	
2018	City of Lies	Mike "Psycho Mike"	
2018	A Woman's Worth	Kenny	
2019	Sins of a Father	Dr. Matthew	Short
2019	The Turnaround	Max	Short
2019	A Clear Shot	Evans	
2019	Charlie Charlie	Jamal's Attorney	
2020	Children of the Sun	Rick Williams	
2021	Dice Game Pt. 2	OG Bobby Johnson	Short
2021	One and the Same	Arthur Stinson	
2021	Dymez	Mr. Mason	
2021	Lockdown 2025	Clarence McGee Sr.	
2021	Relationships	Pastor Jones	
2021	The Magic	Driver	
2021	Asbury Park	Professor Moss	
2021	A New Kind of Woman	Brian	
2021	Black Lies	Marcus	
2022	Amaru	Luis	Short
2022	Last the Night	Security Guard	
2022	I Thought You Knew	C.O. Blake	
2022	Fuhgedd About It	Thomas	
2023	Circumstances 4	Reginald	
2023	Cuzo	Mr. Erickson	
2023	Bay Lawz: Stick to the Code	Eb	
2023	Replica	Ron	
2023	Isleen Pines	The Man	
2024	ElemenTory	Luis Jonmar	
2024	City Boy	"Unc"	
2024	Bang Bang	Darnell Washington	
2024	Isleen Pines	The Man	
2024	Deadly Ruphoria	Romeon Kingston	

=== Television ===
Year	Title	Role	Notes
1987	Beauty and the Beast	Curtis Jackson	Episode: "An Impossible Silence"
1987	Hands of a Stranger	Willy Johnson	TV film
1987	The Father Clements Story		TV film
1988	Ohara	Doctor	Episode: "The Light Around the Body"
1988	Tour of Duty	Duke Jackson	Episode: "The Short Timer"
1988	China Beach	Omar	Episode: "Brothers"
1988	Vietnam War Story	Hank Barr	Episode: "The Promise"
1988	Terrorist on Trial: The United States vs. Salim Ajami	M.P.	TV film
1988–1989	L.A. Law	Lyle Torrey	Recurring Cast: Season 3
1989	Women of Brewster Place	C.C. Baker	Episode: "Episode #1.1" & "#1.2"
1990	Nasty Boys	Russ Stanhope	Episode: "Last Tango in Vegas"
1990	Equal Justice	Jake Burns	Episode: "Balancing Act"
1990	Cop Rock	Byron "Byron B"	Episode: "Pilot"
1990	Heat Wave	J.T. Turpin	TV film
1991	Murderous Vision	Detective Beau Galloway	TV film
1993	Kung Fu: The Legend Continues	Marie	Episode: "Disciple"
1993	Dream On	Andre Wilson	Episode: "Home Sweet Homeboy"
1993	The Fresh Prince of Bel-Air	"Top Dog"	Episode: "Blood Is Thicker Than Mud"
1994	South Central	Bobby Johnson	Episode: "Men"
1994	ER	Desk Clerk Timmy Rawlins	Recurring Cast: Season 1
1995	Convict Cowboy	Jimmy Lattrell	TV film
1997	Lawless	Reggie	Episode: "Pilot"
1997	Pronto	Robert Gee	
1998	The Jamie Foxx Show	Dr. Maouff	Episode: "Ain't Nothin' Happenin' Cap'n"
1998	The Substitute 2: School's Out	Gang Member #1	TV film
1999	The Hunger	Stephen Keller	Episode: "Night Bloomer"
2000	The Corner	George "Blue" Epps	Main Cast
2001	Three Blind Mice	Warren Chambers	TV film
2001	Ruby's Bucket of Blood	Johnny Beaugh	TV film
2003	The Dead Zone	Jimmy "Jimmy D"	Episode: "The Combination"
2004	Medical Investigation	Cooly	Episode: "You're Not Alone"
2004	Reversible Errors	Romeo "Squirrel" Gandolf	TV film
2006	Bones	Harold Overmeyer	Episode: "The Woman in the Tunnel"
2007	ER	Desk Clerk Timmy Rawlins	Recurring Cast: Season 13
2007	Dexter	Jimmy	Episode: "It's Alive!"
2008–2009	Sons of Anarchy	Officer Vic Trammel	Recurring Cast: Season 1 Guest Star: Season 2, "Gilead"
2009	Raising the Bar	Frank Lewis	Episode: "Bobbi Ba-Bing"
2010	Cold Case	A.C.	Episode: "Shattered"
2012	Southland	Darrell Miller	Episode: "Underwater"
2014	Scorpion	Agent Thomas Keeler	Episode: "A Cyclone"
2014	Major Crimes	Joe Wyatt	Episode: "Trial by Fire"
2015	Battle Creek	Clarence	Episode: "Old Wounds"
2015	Law & Order: Special Victims Unit	Derek Thompson	Episode: "Perverted Justice"
2015	Welcome to the Family	Fordel	TV film
2016	Suits	Leonard Bailey	Recurring Cast: Season 6
2016	Family Time	Herbie	Episode: "Daddie Donnie"
2017	Grown Folks	Plot Salesman	Episode: "Snitches Get Stitches"
2018	Greenleaf	Vernon	Episode: "Chain of Command"
2018	Shameless	Jacob	Episode: "Are You There Shim? It's Me, Ian."
2019-2024	9-1-1	Dennis Jenkins	Guest: Season 3, Recurring Cast: Season 8
2020–2022	A House Divided	Abeo	Recurring Cast: Season 3–4
2021	Sangre Negra... Black Blood	Julian "Windy City" Lewis	Recurring Cast: Season 2
2024	The Block Trilogies	Uncle Connie	Main Cast
