= Lust Connection =

2005 film directed by Jim Wynorski

- Directed by: Jim Wynorski
- Release date: 2005
- Country: USA
- Language: English

Lust Connection is a 2005 American erotic thriller film directed by Jim Wynorski.

== Cast ==
- Glori-Anne Gilbert as Jenny / Susan
- Frank Harper as Rick
- Monique Parent as Beth
- John Henry Richardson as Detective Blake (credited as Jay Richardson)
- Kirk Flavious as Detective Kramer
- Chasey Lain as Molly "Pizza Molly"
- Avy Scott as Cora
- Holly Hollywood as Girl In Hotel
- Jodie Moore as The Stranger

== See also ==
- List of American films of 2005
