= Sonia Satra =

American actress (born 1967)

Sonia Satra (born December 17, 1967, in Glen Ridge, New Jersey) is an American actress. She is known for her roles on Guiding Light and One Life to Live.

== Personal life ==
She was born, the youngest of three children, to Gunvor Satra, a Norwegian history professor, and John Satra, an Austrian economics professor. Before starting a career in acting, she attended Rutgers University, where she earned a Bachelor of Arts degree in communication.

Satra is married to Stephen David, whom is the president and executive producer of Stephen David Entertainment, and they have two children, Kaya (born in c. 2004) and Ty (born in 2007).

== Career ==
She is best known for her work as Lucy Cooper on the soap opera Guiding Light, which she played from 1993 to 1997, and for her role as Barbara Graham on One Life to Live from 1998 to 1999. She has since dabbled in movie production, producing and starring in the film Pride & Loyalty in 2002. She was also in The Men Who Built America and American Genius.

== Filmography ==
Year	Title	Role	Notes
1993	Guiding Light	Lucy Cooper	1993–1997
1993	Dark Justice	Tess	("Pygmalion")
1993	Brainsmasher... A Love Story	Model #1	video
1995	Bonanza: Under Attack	Unknown	TV movie
1997	Baywatch	Betsy Wexler	("Next Generation")
1998	One Life to Live	Nurse Barbara Graham	1998–1999
1998	Hyacinth	Fiona	
1999	Soldier of Fortune, Inc.	Sally	("Critical List")
2000	Strike Zone	Rebecca Lamport	video
2000	Intrepid	Sabrina Masters	
2001	My Friend's Love Affair	Sylvia	short
2002	Pride & Loyalty	Lori Belmont	
2007	Cry of the Winged Serpent	Wells	TV movie
2008	The Drum Beats Twice	Dream Judy	
2012	The Men Who Built America	Mrs. Rockefeller	
2014	Redrum	School Counselor	("Don't Wake Daddy")
2015	American Genius	Phoebe Hearst	
