= Rib Hillis =

American model and actor (born 1970)

- Born: November 21, 1970 (age 55)
- Occupations: Model; actor
- Years active: 1996–present

Rib Hillis (born November 21, 1970) is an American model and actor. He is best known for playing Dr. Jake Marshak in the soap opera Port Charles.

== Early life and career ==
Hillis became engaged to fellow actress Jessica Morris in 2022.

=== Modeling ===
During his junior year at the University of Colorado in Boulder, he was discovered by a modeling agent. Since college, he has worked in Milan, Paris, Barcelona, London, Sydney, New York, Miami, and Los Angeles for such publications as Uomo Vogue, GQ, Esquire, and Men's Health, as well as national and international commercials. In addition, he landed various print campaigns for Versace, Armani and Catalyst Cologne.

He appeared in season 4 of America's Next Top Model in 2005 as a lingerie model in the episode "The Girl Who Pushes Tyra Over the Edge".

=== Acting ===
Returning to the United States in spring of 1996, Hillis moved to Los Angeles and landed a role on an episode of Baywatch Nights as Jeds.

His most notable role as an actor came on General Hospital's spin-off Port Charles as Dr. Jake Marshak. He was on the show from 1997 to 1998. In May 2006, he substituted for Eric Martsolf as Ethan Winthrop on Passions when Martsolf took paternity leave for his newborn twin sons. Moreover, he has appeared in dozens of television shows such as Ugly Betty, Two and a Half Men, CSI and CSI: Miami. He also has a starring role in the feature film Propiedad Ajena.

Hillis played the leading role in the Syfy feature film Piranhaconda in 2012. He played Val Walker in Cowboys vs Dinosaurs in 2012.

=== Reality television ===
Hillis has done two home improvement/building shows, Model Citizen and Get a Grip.

In the fall 2007 TV season, Hillis joined the design team on ABC's Extreme Makeover: Home Edition.

== Personal life ==
In May 2023, Hillis married Jessica Morris.

== Filmography ==
=== Film ===
Year	Title	Role	Notes
2001	According to Spencer	Nick	
2005	Empathy	Seth	
2007	Propiedad ajena	Matt Crossman	
2008	Taos	John Wahlberg	
2010	Dinocroc vs. Supergator	Bob Logan	TV movie
2011	The Revivals	Rib	Short
2011	Painting in the Rain	Samuel Becker	
2012	Groom's Cake	Steven James	Short
2012	Life's a Beach	Rock	
2012	Piranhaconda	Jack	TV movie
2012	Sorority Party Massacre	Waiting Room Patient	
2013	616: Paranormal Incident	Freeman	
2013	Birthday Cake	Steven James	
2013	Fencer	Coach Richard	Short
2014	Haunting of the Innocent	Tom	
2014	Sharktopus Contra Pteracuda	Hamilton	TV movie
2015	Cowboys vs. Dinosaurs	Val Walker	TV movie
2016	Timber the Treasure Dog	Emmet Jones	
2016	A Doggone Christmas	Robert	
2017	Shockwave	Rob	
2017	A Christmas Cruise	Paul	TV movie
2017	The Wrong Man	Joey Nolan	TV movie
2018	3 F*cks Given	Dance Studio Manager	Short
2018	The Wrong Friend	Mr. Demarco	TV movie
2018	Rusty Tulloch	Red Williamson	
2018	Do Not Be Deceived	John Allen	TV movie
2019	The Wrong Boy Next Door	Scotty	TV movie
2019	Puppy Swap: Love Unleashed	Mel	
2019	Running with the Devil	Mountie #2	
2020	The Wrong Housesitter	Shopper	TV movie
2020	iWalk Boxing	Referee	Short
2020	The Wrong Cheerleader Coach	Father	TV movie
2021	The Wrong Real Estate Agent	PJ	TV movie
2021	The Wrong Mr. Right	Paul	TV movie
2021	Deceived by My Mother-in-Law	James	TV movie
2021	Mommy's Deadly Con Artist	James	TV movie
2021	Psycho Storm Chaser	Carl Highstrom	TV movie
2021	Swim	Tad Randolph	
2021	A Christmas Wish in Hudson	Patrick	TV movie
2023	Sister Obsession	Haden	TV movie
2023	Love at First Like	Alan	TV movie
2023	A Date with Deception	Elias	
2023	Castaways	Tom	
2023	Killbots	Santos	
2023	The Date Whisperer	Frankie	TV movie
2023	Katie's Mom	Jeff	
2023	Kill Shot	Jackson Hardison	
2023	Riley	Carson Riley	
2023	Secrets Beneath the Floorboards	Brad	TV movie
2024	Powder Pup	Kennith Kendrick	
2024	A Deadly Threat to My Family	Aleph	TV movie
2024	Couples Retreat Murder	Jim	TV movie
2024	Valleyheart	Dim	

=== Television ===
Year	Title	Role	Notes
1996	Baywatch Nights	Jed	Episode: "Circle of Fear"
1997-98	Port Charles	Dr. Jake Marshak	Regular Cast
1998	Clueless	Brad	Episode: "Model Smoker"
1999	Baywatch	Jake Barnes	Episode: "Baywatch Down Under: Part 1 & 2"
1999	Angel	Pierce	Episode: "Bachelor Party"
2000	Bull	Jeff	Episode: "Final Hour"
2001-02	Son of the Beach	Digger Gooseberry	Guest Cast: Season 2-3
2003	CSI: Crime Scene Investigation	Croix Richards	Episode: "Lady Heather's Box"
2004	Eve	James	Episode: "For Love and Money"
2005	America's Next Top Model	Himself	Episode: "The Girl Who Pushes Tyra Over the Edge"
2006	Ugly Betty	Sven	Episode: "After Hours"
2007	CSI: Miami	Brett Morrison	Episode: "Burned"
2007-10	Extreme Makeover: Home Edition	Himself/Carpenter	Main Cast: Season 5–6
2008	Two and a Half Men	Justin	Episode: "Waiting for the Right Snapper"
2010	ACME Saturday Night	Himself/Guest Host	Episode: "Rib Hillis"
2011	ACME Hollywood Dream Role	Himself	Episode: "Amy Paffrath & Rib Hillis"
2012	Melissa & Joey	Stewart Thomas	Episode: "All Up in My Business"
2012	The Bay	Matthew Johnson #2	Episode: "Darkside of the Bay: Part 1 & 2"
2014	Modern Family	Jim Perlowe	Episode: "The Feud"
2018	The Rookie	Porsche Guy	Episode: "The Ride Along"
2021	Keeping Up with the Joneses	Danny	Episode: "The Wrong Family"
2024	The Tall Tales of Jim Bridger	Jim Bridger	Main Cast
