= Treasure Hunt (2003 film) =

- Directed by: Jim Wynorski
- Written by: Jim Wynorski
- Starring: Melissa Brasselle; Richard Gabai
- Release date: 2003
- Country: United States
- Language: English

Treasure Hunt is a 2003 American film directed by Jim Wynorski and starring Melissa Brasselle and Richard Gabai.

While making the film in Hawaii Wynorski took three of the actors to a secluded waterfall location on their day off and shot what would become the first segment of Curse of the Komodo.

== Cast ==
- Rocky DeMarco as Miranda (credited as Melissa Brasselle)
- Richard Gabai as Dan
- Samantha Phillips as Herself
- Lenny Juliano as Skippy
- Gail Thackray as Herself (credited as Gail Harris
- Ted Monte as Himself
- Glori-Anne Gilbert as Glory
- Mary Ann Schmidt as Herself
- Shea Smith as Herself
- Jim Wynorski as Himself
- John Henry Richardson as H.G. (credited as Jay Richardson)
- Tane McClure as Ginger LaMarca
- Sheena Metal as Marcella (credited as Jenny Sherwin)
- John Cecill as Tom
- Steve Mitchell as Himself
- James Lockwood as "Fabulous"
- Mary Lou Bell as Herself
- Hayley Sanchez as Hayley Daniels
- Julie Strain as Herself
- William Langlois as Reverend Karras (credited as E. Eddy Edwards)

== See also ==
- List of American films of 2003
