= Hard Bounty =

1995 film

- Directed by: Jim Wynorski
- Written by: Karen Kelly
- Produced by: Jim Wynorski, Andrew Stevens
- Cinematography: Zoltzn Hochstatter
- Edited by: Mark Speer
- Music by: Taj
- Production company: Sunset Films International
- Release date: 1995
- Running time: 88 minutes
- Country: United States
- Language: English

Hard Bounty is a 1995 American Western film.

== Plot ==
Martin Kanning is a former Texas Ranger turned bounty hunter. Kanning is a man of honor but when his latest bounty turns out to be innocent, he gives up bounty hunting and buys the saloon and brothel. One day a man he knows, Carver, shows up. It seems as if he and Carver have some bad history. Carver hooks up with one of the prostitutes and kills her. After Carver leaves, the girl is found. Donnie, Kanning's amour, says that Carver did it but the Sheriff doesn't want to do anything. So she and some other prostitutes ride out to find Carver. Kanning follows them. Carver learning of them sends some men to get them before they show up where he is, but they are killed by the women. The action then moves back to the town where a final shootout takes place.

== Cast ==
- Matt McCoy as Kanning
- Kelly Le Brock as Donnie
- John Terlesky as Carver
- Kimberly Kelley as Glory
- Rochelle Swanson as Jess
- Felicity Waterman as Rachel
- Ross Hagen as The Sheriff
- Robert Peters as "Sneaky"
- George "Buck" Flower as Harper

== Production ==
The film was shot at Old Tucson Studios, located near Tucson, Arizona and is produced in a Spaghetti western style.
