= Air Rage (film) =

2001 film by Fred Olen Ray

- Theatrical film poster
- Directed by: Fred Olen Ray (as Ed Raymond)
- Written by: Sean O'Bannon
- Produced by: Don Key Jr. Alison Semenza; Jim Wynorski
- Starring: Ice-T; Cyril O'Reilly
- Cinematography: Mac Ahlberg
- Edited by: Sabastian James; Vanick Moradian
- Music by: David Wurst; Eric Wurst
- Release date: 2001
- Running time: 99 minutes
- Country: United States
- Language: English

Air Rage is a 2001 American action film directed by Fred Olen Ray (credited as Ed Raymond) and starring Ice-T and Cyril O'Reilly.

== Plot ==
Colonel John Sykes orders his men to massacre a village where they were sent to rescue hostages, but decides to get payback when they find them dead. When Sykes returns to the U.S. to be court-martialed he is forced to make a plea agreement where he receives all the blame in order that his men will be honorably discharged and receive all of the benefits they are entitled to. However, General Harlan Prescott, who is presiding over the trial, chooses to not agree to the terms and throws the book at Sykes. Sykes and his men are dishonorably discharged. While Sykes is being transported, he's rescued by his men. Sometime later, Prescott has been appointed to an important government position and he boards a plane to go on his latest assignment. Sykes and his men are also on the plane and take control over the plane. When the tower learns of the deviation, a government man arrives and upon learning of Sykes' presence on the plane sends a team to board the plane while in flight. After the team is massacred by Sykes and his men, the sole survivor has to stop Sykes and his only help is the flight attendant.

== Cast ==
- Ice-T as Matt Marshall
- Cyril O'Reilly as Colonel John Sykes
- Kimberly Oja as Kelly Young
- Steve Hytner as Morton
- Gil Gerard as Victor Quinn
- Alex Cord as General Harlan Prescott
- Glynn Turman as Ted Bigelow
- Mary Elizabeth McGlynn as Gwen
- Chick Vennera as Fishman
- WC as Ferris
- Jack McGee as John Simpson

== Reception ==
"Attitude and altitude combine in this high-flying hijacking adventure.", commented TV guide, in a review that also stated, " Unable to muffle the rap cadences in his speech, Ice-T inadvertently turns his performance here into an exercise in camp. His comical implausibility is woefully apparent in this routine adventure populated by cardboard fascists and one-dimensional heroes." The film has also been described as "essentially wartime propaganda about a flying fortress and its crew".
