= Timber the Treasure Dog =

- Film poster
- Directed by: Ari Novak
- Written by: Nick Campagna; Rolfe Kanefsky; Ari Novak
- Produced by: Mike Gut
- Starring: Kix Brooks; Wilford Brimley
- Cinematography: Noel Maitland
- Edited by: Joseph Sandoval
- Music by: Christopher Cano; Reinhold Hoffmann
- Release date: January 5, 2016
- Running time: 89 minutes
- Country: United States
- Language: English

Timber the Treasure Dog is a 2016 American family film directed by Ari Novak and starring Wilford Brimley and featuring the voice of Kix Brooks as the titular character. The film was released to DVD and streaming platforms on January 5, 2016.

== Cast ==
- Wilford Brimley as Hawk Jones
- J.D. Hoppe as Mikey Jones
- Averie South as Billie Fanning
- Sage Chase as Claire Jones
- Rib Hillis as Emmet Jones
- Sewell Whitney as Casper Stonewall
- Jessica Morris as Jamie Fanning

=== Voice cast ===
- Kix Brooks as Timber
- Vernon Wells as Wolf
- Kelcey Watson as BBQ
- Keith Anderson as Thunder
- Sonya Rose Atkinson as Witch
- Nick Campagna as Moo the Cow
- Bob Canush as Lama
- Casey Fitzgerald as Kaia
- John Freeman as Horse
- Duane Gulick as Duane the Horse
- Nikki C. Moler as Kitten
- Ari Novak as Sid the Pig
- Marcelo Palacios as Manny the Pig
- Riddick Sanchez as Party Dog
- Elizabeth Schmiesing as Chicken

== Production ==
Principal photography took place in Paradise Valley during the summer and autumn of 2014.

== Reception ==
Barbara Shulgasser-Parker of Common Sense Media awarded the film three stars out of five, saying "This movie caters to children's dream of overcoming obstacles and acting heroically, especially when their risky behavior turns out to help their parents resolve real-world problems."
