= The Witches of Breastwick =

- Directed by: Jim Wynorski
- Written by: Jim Wynorski
- Release date: 2005
- Country: United States
- Language: English

The Witches of Breastwick is a 2005 softcore erotic parody film directed by Jim Wynorski. It is loosely based on the 1987 film The Witches of Eastwick. The cast includes Joe Souza and Stormy Daniels.

== Premise ==
The film is loosely based on the plot of The Witches of Eastwick, which it parodies. It revolves around a married couple who get involved with three witches.

== Plot ==
David Carter has recurring sexual nightmares in which he sees an unknown house. His wife Tiffany helps him identify and locate the place in the hope that seeing it in reality will free his mind. During their enquiries, the couple meets three women David has seen in his nightmares. They happen to be witches who wish them harm.

== Cast ==
- Joe Souza as David Carter
- Monique Parent as Tiffany Carter
- John Henry Richardson as Dr. Richards
- Jodie Moore as Doctor's Assistant
- Glori-Anne Gilbert as Rebecca
- Stormy Daniels as Felicia
- Julie K. Smith as Lola
- Taimie Hannum as Holly
- Antonia Dorian as LaCaCanya

== Production ==
The Witches of Breastwick was shot in three days. The cast includes Joe Souza in the main role and Stormy Daniels, in one of her non-hardcore roles.

== Reception ==
The making of The Witches of Breastwick was the subject of the documentary Popatopolis. The Witches of Breastwick was repeatedly included in lists of infamous movies, for example as "one of the most ridiculous softcore films" or as one of the worst horror movies.

A review at the French website Horreur.com wrote: "Unfortunately, the film seems to focus solely on the opulent breasts on display. [...] Russ Meyer without kitsch?"

== Home media ==
The film was released on DVD in 2008 as a double feature, with Vampire Call Girls.

== Sequel ==
The Witches of Breastwick film resulted in a sequel, The Witches of Breastwick 2 (2005).
