= Sub Zero (film) =

- Directed by: Jim Wynorski (Jay Andrews)
- Written by: Jonas Quastel
- Produced by: Michael Derbas; Lisa M. Hansen (executive producer)
- Starring: Costas Mandylor; Linden Ashby; Nia Peeples
- Cinematography: Michael Wale
- Edited by: Jessie James Miller; Charlie Renfrew
- Music by: Michael (Mike) Neilson
- Production companies: CineTel Films; Avrio Filmworks
- Distributed by: CineTel Films
- Release date: September 6, 2005 (United States)
- Country: Canada
- Language: English

Sub Zero is a 2005 Canadian action film directed by Jim Wynorski (under the alias Jay Andrews) and starring Costas Mandylor, Linden Ashby, and Nia Peeples.

== Plot ==
After a satellite containing classified information crashes into a mountain peak, a team of experienced climbers and military personnel must race to retrieve the sensitive data despite the risk of an impending blizzard and avalanche.

== Cast ==
- Costas Mandylor as John Deckert
- Nia Peeples as Kelli Paris
- Linden Ashby as Soloman Davis
- Michael Sunczyk as Mike Foster
- Jim Thorburn as Mike Frazier
- Colin Lawrence as Pete Tanner
- Jacqueline Samuda as Sasha Mirov
- Mike Dopud as Dr. Petrov Jenko
- Zoran Vukelic as Ivan Salatka
- Michael Ryan as Martin Cook
- Alistair Abell as Lieutenant Charles Brill
- Dalia Blake as Officer McCoy
- Michael Kopsa as President James Jordan
- Tim Henry as Secretariat T.J. Stocker
- Bruce Dawson as Secretariat Roger Banks
- Alex Bruhanski as Ivan Gregerov
- Kiara Hunter as Major Tamara Holbrook
- Peter Graham-Gaudreau as Captain T.J. Vickwire
- Glori-Anne Gilbert as Nikki Radcliff
- Michael Debras as Pilot
- Ari Solomon as Leader
- John Sampson as Walker
- Taras Kostyuk as Boxer

== See also ==
- List of American films of 2005
