= Costas Mandylor =

Australian actor (born 1965)

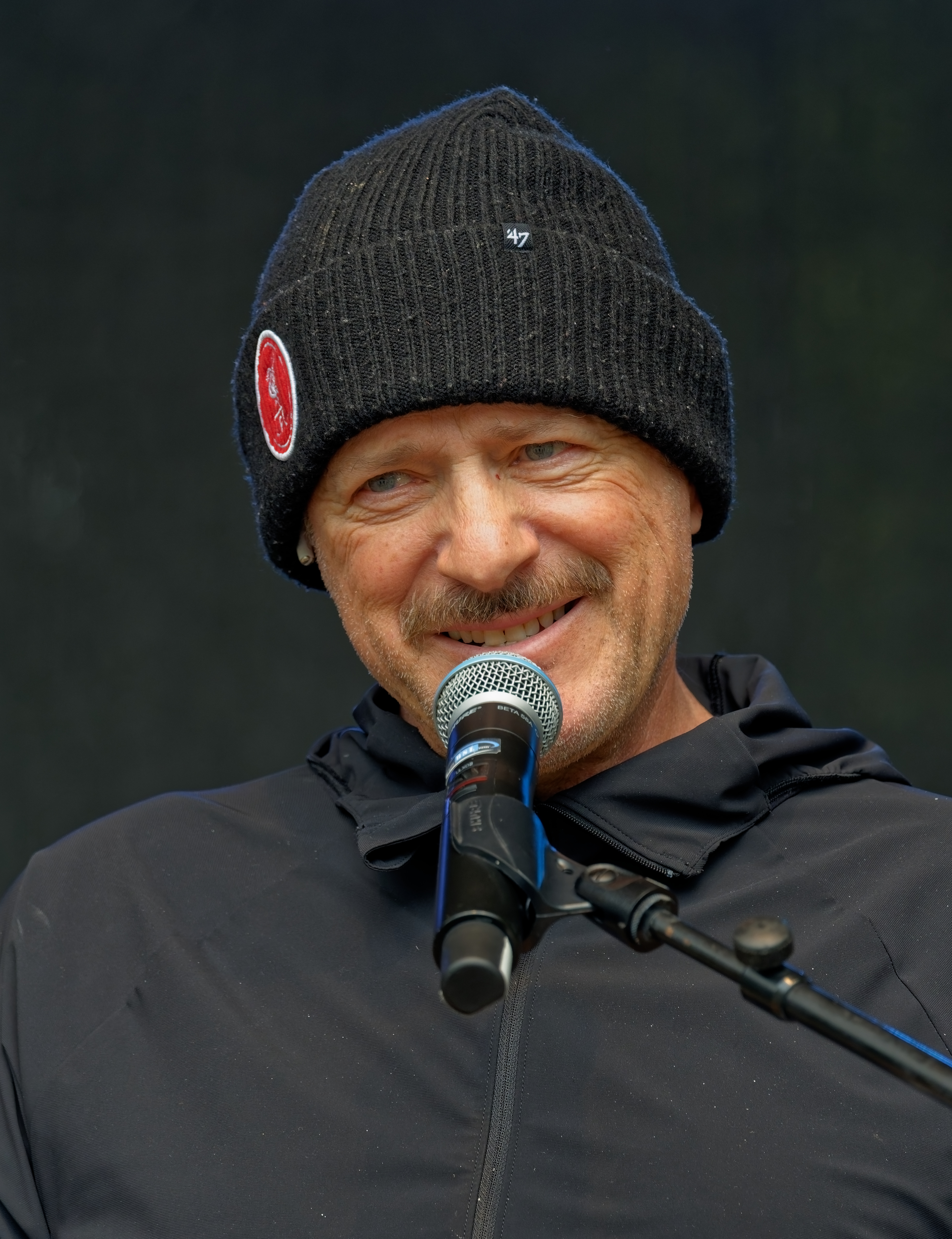
- Mandylor in 2026
- Born: Costas Theodosopoulos; 3 September 1965 (age 61); Melbourne, Victoria, Australia
- Occupation: Actor
- Years active: 1989–present
- Relatives: Louis Mandylor (brother)

Costas Theodosopoulos (born 3 September 1965), known professionally as Costas Mandylor, is an Australian actor. He is best known for his roles as Kenny Lacos in Picket Fences (1992–1996), which earned him two Screen Actors Guild Award nominations, and as Detective Mark Hoffman in the Saw films.

== Early life ==
Costas Theodosopoulos was born on 3 September 1965 in Melbourne, Australia to Greek immigrants Louise Theodosopoulos and Yannis Theodosopoulos, a taxi driver. His younger brother is actor Louis Mandylor. Mandylor grew up in St Kilda and South Melbourne, and moved to the United States in 1987 where he started taking acting lessons. He was initially unable to find any work acting and had to work any job available. He took a version of his mother's maiden name, citing his real name in Greek being too long.

== Career ==
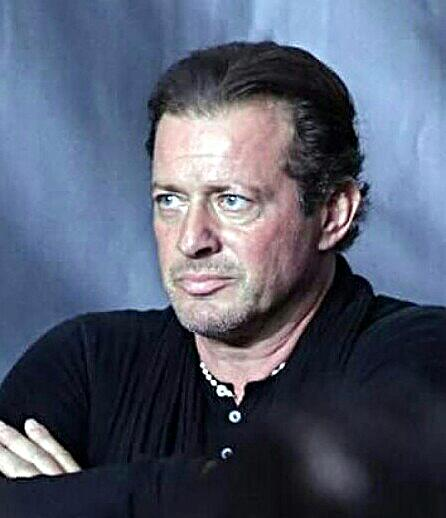
Mandylor in 2015

Mandylor's first major role was in the 1989 film Triumph of the Spirit playing a European Jew, which was filmed at the Auschwitz-Birkenau death camp. He returned to Los Angeles meeting director Oliver Stone and auditioned and got the role of an Italian count in The Doors (1991).

Mandylor landed a leading role in Mobsters playing Mafia boss Frank Costello. He went mentally prepared for the role, telling the Los Angeles Times, "It was interesting that I got that part, because I felt tuned in to gangsters, it was a genre I'd read a lot. When I was 13, I got a job as a dishwasher in a Melbourne nightclub and saw everything there, real gangsters, and had met characters who were dangerous people from an underground world."

In 1992, he had a lead role on the CBS television drama, Picket Fences, playing officer Kenny Lacos until the show ended in 1996.

Mandylor also had a lead role in the Saw films as Detective Mark Hoffman, in Saw III (2006), Saw IV (2007), Saw V (2008), Saw VI (2009) and Saw 3D (2010). He also made a cameo appearance in Saw X (2023).

== Personal life ==
Mandylor played professional Association football until suffering shin splints. He has a daughter. In 1991, he was chosen by People as one of the "50 Most Beautiful People in the world".

== Credits ==
=== Film ===
List of films and roles
Year	Title	Role	Notes	Ref.
1989	Triumph of the Spirit	Avram		
1991	The Doors	Italian Count		
1991	Soapdish	Mark		
1991	Mobsters	Frank Costello		
1994	Fatal Past	Costello		
1994	Almost Dead	Dominic	Previously titled Resurrection	
1995	Venus Rising	Vegas	Direct-to-video	
1995	Fist of the North Star	Lord Shin		
1995	Delta of Venus	Lawrence		
1995	Virtuosity	John Donovan		
1995	Crosscut	Martin Niconi		
1996	Portraits of a Killer	George G. Kendall		
1997	Just Write	Rich Adams		
1997	Stand-ins	Jack Turner		
1997	Double Take	Hector Stroessner / Ray Soldado		
1997	Shelter	Nikos Kostantinos		
1997	My Brother Cicero	Cicero	Short film	
1999	Stealth Fighter	Ryan Mitchell		
1999	Shame, Shame, Shame	Mark		
2000	Gangland	Jared		
2000	Intrepid	Alan Decker		
2001	Turn of Faith	Bobby Giordano		
2001	The Pledge	Monash Deputy		
2001	Above & Beyond	Michael Amorosa		
2002	Cover Story	Kevin Dodd		
2002	The Real Deal	Instructor		
2002	Hitters	Tony		
2004	Dinocroc	Dick Sydney		
2004	The Eavesdropper	Aiden Porter		
2005	The Game of Their Lives	Charlie 'Gloves' Columbo		
2005	Dr. Chopper	Terrell	Direct-to-video	
2005	Sub Zero	John Deckert	Direct-to-video	
2005	The Shore	Raymond		
2006	Disaster Zone: Volcano in New York	Matt		
2006	Payback	Billy		
2006	Saw III	Mark Hoffman	Credited as Forensic Hoffman	
2007	Made in Brooklyn	Joey		
2007	Nobody	Mortemain / Noe		
2007	Saw IV	Mark Hoffman		
2007	Beowulf	Hondshew		
2008	Emma Blue	Del		
2008	The Drum Beats Twice	Jesus		
2008	Toxic	Steve		
2008	Saw V	Mark Hoffman		
2008	Golden Goal!	Frank Lazaridis		
2009	Immortally Yours	Rex		
2009	In the Eyes of a Killer	Congressman Donaldson		
2009	Saw VI	Mark Hoffman		
2010	The Cursed	Jimmy Muldoon		
2010	Sinners and Saints	Raymond Crowe	Also known as Bad Cop	
2010	Torn	Steve Clay		
2010	An Affirmative Act	Matthew		
2010	Saw 3D	Mark Hoffman		
2011	Hyenas	Gannon		
2012	Should've Been Romeo	Mason		
2013	Five Thirteen	Sheriff O'Connor		
2013	2 Dead 2 Kill	Vin Dictive		
2014	The Blackout	Jim		
2014	2 Bedroom 1 Bath	Frank		
2014	Guardian Angel	Attila		
2014	The Nurse	Martin		
2014	In 10 Easy Steps	Isaak Misidis		
2015	Blood Trap	Roman	Also known as Bite	
2016	Beyond the Game	Frank Bisner		
2016	The Horde	Cylus Atkinson	Direct-to-video	
2016	Best Thanksgiving Ever	Aquavelva		
2017	Residue	Jacob		
2018	Blindsided	Congressman Donaldson		
2018	Daddy's Girl	John		
2018	In Like Flynn	Vassilis		
2019	Cliffs of Freedom	Constantine		
2020	C.L.E.A.N.	Dr. Sutter		
2020	Incision	Dr. Bennett		
2021	Born a Champion	Dimitris		
2021	Cosmic Sin	Marcus Bleck		
2021	Lazarus	Benjamin Poge		
2021	Night of the Sicario	Agent Cole Bennett		
2021	Locked In	Harris		
2022	Unbound Evil	Robert		
2022	Dangerous Methods	Harry Johnson		
2022	Borrowed Time III	David McDowell		
2022	Death Count	Warden		
2022	Adrenaline	FBI Agent Lockwood		
2022	Trail Blazers	Jasper		
2023	1521: The Quest for Love and Freedom	Lorenzo		
2023	Dead Man's Hand	Lucas		
2023	Bloodthirst	John Shepard		
2023	Saw X	Mark Hoffman		
2024	Brat 3	The Customer		
2024	American Trash	Detective Anderson		
2024	Taboo: Secrets of the Family	Luckas		
2024	Tragic Waste	Bill Johnson		
2024	WWII: Operation Phoenix	Henry Tasquer Finn		
2025	Gunslingers	Jericho		
2025	The Aegean	Hector		
2025	Out for Vengeance	Alonzo Gurski		
2025	Wrongful Death 2: Bloodlines	Dr. Thomas Miller		
2025	Cash Collectors	Duke		
2025	Run	Boss		
2026	Billy the Kid: Blood and Legend	Pat Garrett		
2026	Citizen Vigilante	Henry		
TBA	Dying for Living †	Pear	Post-production	
TBA	Someone Dies Tonight †	Emil Parker	Post-production	
TBA	Geisha War †	Carmine	Post-production	
TBA	12 Warriors †	Abel	Post-production	

=== Television ===
List of television appearances and roles
Year	Title	Role	Notes
1992– 1996	Picket Fences	Officer Kenny Lacos	Main role
1993	Tales from the Crypt	Dan King	Episode: "Half-Way Horrible"
1995	Falling for You	Paul Blankenship	Television film
1996	Last Exit to Earth	Jaid	Television film
1996	The Outer Limits	Lee Taylor	Episode: "The Heist"
1997	F/X: The Series	Jerry Tamblin	Episode: "Get Fast"
1997	Love-Struck	Cupid on Earth	Television film
1997– 1998	Players	Alphonse Royo	Main role
1998	The Fury Within	Mike Hanlon	Television film
1998	Exiled	Gianni Uzielli	Television film
1999	Bonanno: A Godfather's Story	Salvatore Bonanno	Television film
2000	Secret Agent Man	Monk	Main role
2000	Resurrection Blvd.	Aaron Cross	Episode: "Luchando"; Episode: "Cholitas"
2001	Nash Bridges	Vincent Corell	Episode: "Something Borrowed"
2001	Sanctuary	Nathan Delaney	Television film
2001	Sex and the City	Friar Fuck	Episode: "The Agony and the Ex-tacy"
2002	Andromeda	Bobby Jensen	Episode: "Be All My Sins Remembered"
2002	Sacred Ground	Greg	Episode: "Behind the Words"; Episode: "Walk Like a Man"
2002	Charmed	Rick Lang	Episode: "Saving Private Leo"
2002	She Spies	Mica Divornak	Episode: "Poster Girl"
2002	Scent of Danger	Chris Milos	Television film
2003	Fastlane	Reno Castelli	Episode: "Slippery Slope"
2004	Just Desserts	Marco Poloni	Television film
2004– 2006	7th Heaven	Beau Brewer	Recurring role
2007	The Wedding Bells	Ernesto	Episode: "For Whom the Bells Toll"
2007	Primal Doubt	Chase Harper	Television film
2013	Major Crimes	Vince Webb	Episode: "D.O.A"
2013	NCIS	Tomas Mendez	Episode: "Whiskey Tango Foxtrot"; Episode: "Past, Present, and Future'
2014	House of Secrets	Detective Morrison	Television film
2015	The Right Girl	Chester	Television film
2016	Once Upon a Time	Captain Silver	Episode: "The Brothers Jones"
2017	Blue Eyes	Russian	Television film
2017	The Last Ship	Admiral Demetrius	Episode: "Tempest"; Episode: "Feast; Episode: "Lazaretto"
2017– 2018	NCIS: Los Angeles	Abram Sokolov	Episode: "Mountebank"; Episode: "Vendetta"
2018	Hawaii Five-0	Vasili Shirokov	Episode: "Waiho Wale Kahiko"
2018	Lethal Weapon	Fabrizio Stavos	Episode: "What the Puck"

=== Awards and nominations ===
Year	Award	Category	Nominated work	Result
1995	Screen Actors Guild Awards	Outstanding Performance by an Ensemble in a Drama Series	Picket Fences	Nominated
1996	Screen Actors Guild Awards	Outstanding Performance by an Ensemble in a Drama Series	Picket Fences	Nominated
2009	MTV Movie & TV Awards	Best Fight (shared with Scott Patterson)	Saw V	Nominated
2020	Buffalo Dreams Fantastic Film Festival	Outstanding Actor in a Feature	Daddy's Girl	Nominated
2020	FFTG Awards	Best Supporting Actor	C.L.E.A.N.	Won
