= The Wasp Woman (1995 film) =

1995 horror film

- American DVD/VHS cover of "The Wasp Woman"
- Genre: Horror; Thriller; Science Fiction
- Created by: Roger Corman
- Based on: 1959 film of the same name screenplay by Leo Gordon
- Screenplay by: Daniella Purcell; Guy Prevost
- Story by: Kinta Zertuche
- Directed by: Jim Wynorski
- Starring: Jennifer Rubin; Doug Wert; Daniel J. Travanti; Melissa Brasselle; Maria Ford; Jay Richardson; Gerrit Graham
- Theme music composer: Terry Plumeri
- Country of origin: United States
- Original language: English

Production
- Executive producers: Roger Corman; Lance H. Robbins
- Producer: Mike Elliott
- Production locations: Bronson Caves, Bronson Canyon, Griffith Park – 4730 Crystal Springs Drive, Los Angeles; Truesdale Facility – 11797 Truesdale Street, Department of Water & Power, Sun Valley, Los Angeles
- Cinematography: Mike Mickens
- Editor: Daniel H. Holland
- Running time: 87 minutes
- Production companies: Concorde-New Horizons; Libra Pictures; Showtime Networks

Original release
- Network: Showtime
- Release: 1995

The Wasp Woman (also known as Forbidden Beauty) is a 1995 television body horror film directed by Jim Wynorski and starring Jennifer Rubin and Doug Wert. It is a remake of the 1959 film of the same name, which was produced and directed by Roger Corman. The film first aired on the Showtime Network in 1995.

The film, produced and distributed by Concorde Pictures, was a Roger Corman production. It was the eighth installment of the anthology film series Roger Corman Presents.

== Plot ==
Janice Starlin is a model who has built up her own cosmetics company. She has always modeled for her own company's advertisements, but now that she is in her forties, investors are advising her to step aside in favor of a younger model. In desperation, she consults a scientist working on a new youth serum based on wasp hormones. Eager for any possible treatment, Janice agrees to be the first human test subject. At first, the results seem miraculous-she looks like a 25-year-old. As time goes on, however, the terrible side effects of the drug become all too apparent.

== Cast ==
- Jennifer Rubin as Janice Starlin
- Doug Wert as Alec
- Daniel J. Travanti as Dr. Eric Zinthorp
- Melissa Brasselle as Mary Dennison
- Maria Ford as Caitlin
- Jay Richardson as John
- Gerrit Graham as Arthur Cooper
- Richard Gabai as Nick
- Johnny Williams as Wasp Collector
- Lenny Juliano as Wise Guy
- Julie K. Smith as Carla
- Fred Olen Ray as "Tex"
- John Henry Richardson as John
- Kimberley Roberts as Jogger
- Antonia Dorian as Roommate
- Rob Kerchner as Assistant
- Greg Aronowitz as The Wasp Woman

== Production ==
Jim Wynorski was an admirer of the original 1959 film: "Roger shot it on used sets. He's a true genius when it comes to taking something that's just sitting there and making a movie around it. He did a great job". Wynorski said remaking the film was his idea: "The original had a very interesting plot, but the film never followed through with the special effects. So I wanted to do it with some bigger crazier effects". Wynorski began his film career working for Roger Corman. He said he wanted to make the film "partly out of nostalgia, partly out of respect to a man who really gave me my start. You don't get to make a wacky crazy thing like Wasp Woman all the time. Now if I could remake Attack of the Crab Monsters, it would make my life complete".

The film had a 20-day shooting schedule. Wynorski revealed: "There's a lot of special effects and things they couldn't do in six days. We have a giant 12-foot-long wasp with wings that fly. It's a wasp with breasts actually. It's quite an astounding thing to see".

In an interview with Rubin from Kitley's Krypt, she spoke of the film: "I did Wasp Woman because I wanted to go through the Corman studios of course. My best friend, Marta Mobley, was running Corman Studios back then, and she asked me to do it. And I wanted to pass through Corman's place". Asking if Rubin was the person in the Wasp costume during the film, she replied: "No, but the wasp was incredible".

In the same interview, Rubin spoke of director Jim Wynorski, and what it was like working with him: "Despicable. He hated me. He was incredibly mean and rude. Fangoria magazine was there on that set of all places, and interviewed someone who wouldn't give their name and said such mean things about me to that magazine. There were times that it was so loud on the set that I can't even hear myself to think my lines with a page and half of dialogue. It was the worst set I've ever been on in my life. The sound guy, Jeff Enden, was incredible nice to me and was a great friend. But Wynorski, he's a pig. To say I wanted to go through Corman studios, I should have looked at it more carefully. I've never had to experience anybody in my life as disgusting as him".

== Release ==
The film was initially released on VHS and LaserDisc in 1996 through New Horizons Home Video. The front cover artwork showed the wasp creature. In 1998, it was released on VHS through New Concorde, featuring new artwork, showing a close-up shot of Rubin, with a DVD version being released in 2004.

== Reception ==
TV Guide awarded the film one out of four stars writing: "Tired plotting and terrible special effects make this one of the worst of the Roger Corman-produced, made-for-cable remakes of his 1950s shockers". Richard Jack Smith from ReelTalk.com criticized the film's direction, script, and "lame duck special effects". Obscurehorror.com gave a favorable review: "The remake watched over by previous director Roger Corman, this film does a bit better in comparison to the first film. The effects which were weak in the first movie are much better and frankly, only time and technology could have done that".
