= Sorceress (1995 film) =

1995 film by Jim Wynorski

- Directed by: Jim Wynorski
- Screenplay by: Mark Thomas McGee
- Produced by: Fred Olen Ray
- Starring: Larry Poindexter; Julie Strain; Linda Blair; Edward Albert
- Cinematography: Gary Graver
- Edited by: W. Peter Miller
- Music by: Chuck Cirino; Darryl Way
- Production company: Win-Tone Productions
- Release date: January 4, 1995
- Running time: 89 minutes
- Country: United States
- Language: English

Sorceress (also known as Temptress II) is a 1995 American erotic horror film directed by Jim Wynorski. Released direct-to-video on January 4, 1995, it is considered a cult film. A sequel followed in 1997.

Larry Poindexter, Julie Strain, Linda Blair, and Edward Albert star in the film. Michael Parks was in the film in a supporting role.

== Plot ==
An attorney is rising through the ranks at a prominent law firm due to his wife's black magic. However, he will have to face a new case involving another sorceress who might make it hard for him.

== Cast ==
- Larry Poindexter as Larry Barnes
- Julie Strain as Erica Barnes
- Linda Blair as Amelia Reynolds
- Edward Albert as Howard Reynolds
- Michael Parks as Stan Latarga
- Lenny Juliano as Don
- Rochelle Swanson as Carol
- Toni Naples as Maria
- William Marshall as John Geiger
- Antonia Dorian as Trisha
- Kristi Ducati as Kathy
- Melissa Brasselle as Annie Latarga
- Fred Olen Ray as Bill Carson

== See also ==
- List of American films of 1995
