= The Assault (1996 film) =

- Directed by: Jim Wynorski
- Starring: Matt McCoy
- Release date: 1996
- Country: United States
- Language: English

The Assault is a 1996 American action film directed by Jim Wynorski. The plot was influenced by Assault on Precinct 13.

== Plot ==
Detective Stacy (Stacie Randall) brings a witness for protection at a women's retreat. Villains descend on the building and the women and maintenance man Mike (Matt McCoy) have to fight them off.

== Cast ==
- Stacie Randall as Stacy
- Matt McCoy as Mike
- Melissa Brasselle as Toni
- Sandahl Bergman as Helen
- Leo Rossi as Zigowski

== Reception ==
Reviewer Douglas Pratt wrote that the "film is loaded with action scenes and supposedly helpless women wasting dozens of tough guys armed to the teeth, so what's not to like?."
