= Cry of the Winged Serpent =

2005 American Film

Cry of the Winged Serpent is a 2005 American film directed by Jim Wynorski for Concorde-New Horizons. Roger Corman was executive producer. It aired on the Syfy channel.

The film was inspired by the 1982 film Q - the Winged Serpent. The movie was one of a number of "creature features" from Wynorski.

== Plot ==
A man calls upon a winged serpent to avenge the death of his family.

== Cast ==
- Robert Beltran as Father Juan
- Carlos Moreno Jr. as Miguel
- Sonia Satra as Wells
- Adrian Alvarado as Jesus Franco
- Brooke Mason as Maddelena
- Tamie Sheffield as Griffin's Girlfriend
- Jeff Rector as Internal Affairs Agent
- Glori-Anne Gilbert as Cop
- Travis Richey as Gang Leader
- Maxwell Caulfield as Griffin
- Juan Carlos Cantu as Ramirez
- Chris Lerude as Arms Dealer
- Trinidad 'Zeus' Nizelli as Marchetti
- Steve Purnick as Henry
- Adrian Vatsky as Drug Dealer (credited as Boris Vatsky)

== Reception ==
According to Dread Central it was "the most enjoyable movie Jim Wynorski has made in close to the last twenty years. Though it’s not without its problems, those problems are not movie killers. I’d dare say those problems give the film a rough around the edges feel that enhances its B-movie goodness."
