= Popatopolis =

- Directed by: Clay Westervelt
- Written by: Clay Westervelt
- Produced by: Clay Westervelt
- Starring: Jim Wynorski; Roger Corman; Andy Sidaris; Julie Strain; Julie K. Smith; Stormy Daniels
- Cinematography: Clay Westervelt
- Edited by: Brooks Larson
- Music by: Lee Sanders
- Release date: October 6, 2009
- Running time: 75 minutes
- Country: United States
- Language: English

Popatopolis is a 2009 documentary film directed by Clay Westervelt about the making of Jim Wynorski's 2005 soft-core horror film, The Witches of Breastwick. The film's title is a reference to "Tom Popatopolous", one of Wynorski's director pseudonyms.

The film serves as a partial biography, with clips from many of his previous films, and includes interviews with Wynorski himself, as well as his contemporaries, cast and crew. The documentary features B-Movie and film personalities like Roger Corman, Andy Sidaris, Julie Strain, Julie K. Smith and Stormy Daniels.

After the release of Popatopolis Wynorski expressed: "A director spent five years making this documentary about me. It was very flattering during the production period, but I was a bit worried how it might turn out. In the end, I found it very funny – even if it does take an occasional stab at me".

== Content ==
The documentary follows American director Jim Wynorski, in his attempt to make a film in three days. By cutting shooting schedule, crew, equipment, and food, Wynorski tries to eliminate any limitation that would slow down production.

== Cast ==
- Jim Wynorski as himself
- Julie K. Smith as herself
- Julie Strain as herself
- Monique Parent as herself
- Stormy Daniels as herself
- Antonia Dorian as herself
- Roger Corman as himself
- Andy Sidaris as himself
- Joe Souza as himself

== Reception ==
A very positive review in The Moving Arts Film Journal wrote, "Potatopolis is funny, absurd and never boring, but its real success lies in its more tender and surprisingly humanistic moments wherein a multi-dimensional sympathetic person is revealed behind an impenetrable monolithic persona." The website The Spinning Image too praised the film and its depth.

A review at Video Graveyard stated, "If you've grown tired of all the uninspired and boring featurettes littering your DVD collection then Popatopolis is for you. If you have any sort of interest in how low-budget films are made, or on the home video boom of the 80's and 90's, you're sure to find something of interest here."

Mitchell Wells, for Horror Society, stated, "Humorous and insightful, this award-winning documentary peeks into the top-popping world of B-movies before they disappear from our shelves forever."
