= Rangers (film) =

- Directed by: Jim Wynorski
- Written by: Steve Latshaw
- Produced by: Alsion Semenza; Noble Henry
- Starring: Glenn Plummer; Matt McCoy; Corbin Bernsen
- Production company: Phoenician Entertainment
- Release date: 2000
- Running time: 100 Minutes
- Country: USA
- Language: English

Rangers is a 2000 American action film directed by Jim Wynorski.

== Plot ==
Terrorists capture a member of a US military unit deployed in the Middle East and offer him the opportunity to take revenge against his superiors.

== Reception ==
"This low -budget video premiere is pretty much the standard bang-bang boom-boom American commandos vs. Arab terrorists", wrote Mayo and Olenski, although they praised the commentary track by the director on the DVD version.

Clive Davies was extremely critical of the film and found it used footage from Navy Seals, Delta Force, Invasion USA and Red Heat.

The Croatian website MojTV wrote: "Non-stop action and spectacular confrontations are the hallmarks of any action film, and Rangers [...] uses a combination of pure action with elements of spy thrillers, most notably in the character of the resourceful senator, embodied by well-known television personality Corbin Bernsen (L.A Law). The rest of the cast is led by reliable action actors Glenn Plummer and Matt McCoy."
