= Clay Westervelt =

American film director

- Born: Clayton James Westervelt; United States
- Education: University of Southern California
- Occupations: Director, Producer, Cinematographer
- Years active: 1997–present
- Spouse: Sunny Rashidi

Clayton "Clay" Westervelt is a film director, producer, and cinematographer based in Los Angeles, California. He is the founder of Martini Crew Booking and Imaginaut Entertainment.

== Career ==
Westervelt attended graduate school at University of Southern California for film, where he received both the Bush and Kodak Awards for Excellence in Cinematography. Subsequently, he filmed pilots for ABC, A&E, Animal Planet, and HGTV. He also produced and directed the award-winning series Storyline Online, featuring such talents as Elijah Wood, Betty White, James Earl Jones, and Al Gore.

In 2009, Westervelt was the Director of Photography for the documentary film The Legend of Pancho Barnes and the Happy Bottom Riding Club, which won an LA-area Emmy award in the Arts & Culture / History category.

He directed and produced the documentaries Popatopolis (2009) and Skum Rocks! (2013) and was cinematographer for Lucky Bastard, Ron Davis' Harry & Snowman, Paragold, Dawn: A Charleston Legend", and other films.

=== Martini Crew Booking ===
Westervelt established Martini Crew Booking as a gear and service provider for television productions in 2000.

=== Imaginaut Entertainment, Inc. ===
In 2003, Westervelt founded Imaginaut Entertainment, Inc., through which he produced the SAG Foundation series, Storyline Online.

== Filmography ==
=== Director ===
Year	Title	Notes
1997	SAG Foundation Conversations	TV series
1998	Thursday Afternoon	Short
2004	Storyline Online 3	TV series
2007	Blinded	Short
2008	Pushing The Envelope	Short
2008	Popatopolis	Documentary
2011	Lexington: Drowning	Video Short
2010-2011	Mario Lopez: Saved By the Baby	TV series; 3 episodes
2012	Nutty	Short
2012	Birdseye Veggies	Short
2012	Box of Nails	Short
2013	Mr. Twister	Documentary Short
2013	Skum Rocks!	Documentary
2003-2014	Storyline Online	TV series (19 episodes)
2014	Sylvania: Invention	Short

=== Awards ===
Year	Award	Category	Film	Result
2000	Temecula Valley International Film Festival	Best Student Film	Thursday Afternoon	Won
2001	CINE Competition	Cine Golden Eagle - Student Division: Drama	Thursday Afternoon	Won
2001	CINE Competition	Cine Eagle - Amateur/Pre-Professional	Thursday Afternoon	Won
2001	Tambay Film and Video Festival	Student Award	Thursday Afternoon	Won
2001	WorldFest-Houston International Film Festival - Gold Award	Independent Student Film & Videos - Graduate Level Student Productions	Thursday Afternoon	Won
2002	Crested Butte International Film Festival	Audience Award	Thursday Afternoon	Won
2002	Crested Butte International Film Festival	Gold Poetic Justice Award	Thursday Afternoon	Won
2010	CINE Competition	Cine Golden Eagle - Feature Documentary	Popatopolis	Won
2012	Honolulu International Festival	Aloha Accolade	Popatopolis	Won
2012	Las Vegas International Film Festival	Golden Ace Award - Music Videos	Nutty	Won
