= Dinocroc =

- DVD cover
- Directed by: Kevin O'Neill
- Written by: Dan Acre; Frances Doel; John Huckert
- Produced by: Damian Akhavi
- Starring: Costas Mandylor; Matthew Borlenghi; Bruce Weitz; Jane Longenecker; Joanna Pacula; Jake Thomas
- Cinematography: Yoram Astrakhan
- Edited by: Damian Akhavi; Ariel Frajnd; John Huckert; Vikram Kale
- Music by: Damon Ebner
- Production company: New Concorde International
- Distributed by: New Concorde Home Entertainment
- Release date: April 24, 2004
- Running time: 86 minutes
- Country: United States
- Language: English

Dinocroc is a 2004 American horror film directed by Kevin O'Neill. The film's plot revolves around a genetically engineered Suchomimus terrorizing the lake-side residents of a small town. The film was executive produced by Roger Corman and stars Matthew Borlenghi, Jane Longenecker, Charles Napier, Costas Mandylor, Bruce Weitz, and Joanna Pacuła.

The film received a limited theatrical release in early 2004. before premiering on the Syfy Channel in April of that year. It was followed by two sequels, Supergator and Dinocroc vs. Supergator, as well as a spin-off film, Dinoshark. Upon release, the film received negative reviews from critics and audiences. It is the first installment in the Dinocroc film series

It later received a Golden Galaxy award.

== Plot ==
A large carnivorous dinosaur from the Cretaceous period of Northern Africa, with a head resembling one of a crocodilian, is found which could grow up to 50 feet long. Dr. Campbell (Bruce Weitz) uses its DNA with a modern-day crocodile to create two hybrids of it at Paula Kennedy's Genetic Research Co. (Gereco) lab. One creature kills Dr. Campbell's assistant and the other creature before escaping. This information is kept from Sheriff Harper (Napier) by Kennedy, stating the dead creature killed Campbell's assistant. His daughter, county dog catcher Diane Harper, helps her ex-welding artist, Tom Banning, and his 12-year-old brother Michael Banning (Jake Thomas) find their three-legged dog, Lucky, who was lost a few days earlier.

Meanwhile, Kennedy sends a trapper to feed the Dinocroc (the animal still being on Gereco Property). The trapper uses Lucky as bait, but Lucky runs away and the Dinocroc quickly kills the trapper soon after. Later in the morning, Diane and Tom find Lucky running around in the woods and try to catch him, unaware that the Dinocroc is lurking nearby. After coming upon the bloody remains of the trapper, Dr. Campbell saves them by shooting at it. Kennedy then hires an Australian crocodile hunter, Dick Sydney (Costas Mandylor), to help kill the Dinocroc after it is discovered to have killed two hunters in the woods (leaving behind one of their guns). Later that night, Michael sneaks out to look for Lucky when he witnesses the creature. The Dinocroc chases Michael through the forest into a tool shed situated on a dock above the water. Dinocroc then gets under the shed (tearing the dock to pieces in the process) and kills Michael from below.

The next day, not having noticed that Michael has gone, Tom, Diane, Dick and Campbell find that the creature is headed toward the town's lakeside beach. It kills three people, the last one being Campbell. In a press conference after the incident, Kennedy lies that Campbell was not part of Gereco. Sheriff Harper then plans to kill the creature with his police force and Diane. While looking for it, they stumble upon Michael's damaged bike and Michael's remains in the ruined shed. Tom, who knows Michael is missing, appears on his motorbike and then speeds away after seeing what is left of his dead brother. After trying to get drunk, Tom cries loudly over his brother and is met by Dick Sydney who is also there to unwind. Sydney explains to Tom how a crocodile killed his son and that is the reason he hunts them. Diane also arrives to comfort Tom along with Lucky. Meanwhile, five of Sheriff Harper's officers are brutally killed by the Dinocroc while searching the swamp for the cause and their mutilated remains are found shortly after.

The next day, Tom, Diane and others devise a plan to trap the Dinocroc in a tunnel and gas it to death. Sheriff Harper uses some of the protected dogs for bait, which Diane and Tom immediately object to; so Harper has them handcuffed and put in the police car. The two manage to escape and use a blowtorch to release the chained dogs while the creature chases them. They trap the Dinocroc in the tunnel and gas it, seemingly killing it.

While a local news crew is taping Kennedy (who arrived after the creature's apparent death) inside the tunnel, telling the reporter false stories about the events, the Dinocroc awakens; it then kills Kennedy and comes after Tom and Diane, who are left after the news crew drives away quickly in terror. After hiding under a truck, they hear a train and lure the Dinocroc across the tracks. It is rammed by a passing train, followed by Tom stabbing it in the eye to the brain with a small pipe as revenge for Michael's death. As the sun rises the next day, Diane and Tom drive away, contemplating leaving for a vacation together just to get away for a while. Then the camera pans slowly back as their truck passes and the Dinocroc is seen walking weakly across the road.

== Cast ==
- Costas Mandylor as Dick Sydney
- Charles Napier as Sheriff Harper
- Bruce Weitz as Dr. Campbell
- Matthew Borlenghi as Tom Banning (Matt Borlenghi)
- Jane Longenecker as Diane Harper
- Max Perlich as Deputy Kerrigan
- Jake Thomas as Michael Banning
- Kerri Hemmington as Annie Dexter
- Price Carson as Edwin Danders
- Joanna Pacula as Paula Kennedy
- Jamie Akhavi as Judith
- Ezekel Cruz as Pool Player

== Music ==
Composer Damon Ebner created background music for the creature, similar to that in Jaws. Every time the creature is near, attacks, or chases a victim, the background music, which was made up of orchestral and choir, accompanies it.

== Sequels ==
After Corman produced Dinocroc in 2004, he proposed a sequel to be named Dinocroc 2, but Sci-Fi Channel turned down the project after claiming that sequels did not do well for them. In 2007, Corman decided to go ahead with the project, but under the name Supergator.

In 2010, Roger Corman produced a third and fourth film, Dinoshark, about a prehistoric shark, and Dinocroc vs. Supergator, which featured the two creatures from Corman's earlier films battling one another. In the film, Dinocroc and Supergator escape from captivity (Dinocroc was possibly recaptured, while they possibly created a clone of Supergator since the original Supergator had died in the previous film). It first aired on Syfy on June 26, 2010, was directed by Jim Wynorski and starred David Carradine and John Callahan.

== Reception ==
On Rotten Tomatoes, the film has three reviews, all negative.

David Nusair of Reel Film Reviews gave it 1 out of 4 and called it "a typically cheesy straight-to-video monster flick". Kevin Carr of 7M Pictures gave it 2.5 out of 5 and wrote: "With a name like Dinocroc, you know you ain't getting 2001: A Space Odyssey. You're not even getting 2001: A Space Travesty. If you don't like stupid monster movies, skip this one."

== Awards ==
The film received a Golden Galaxy Award from the American Science Fiction Society.

== See also ==
- List of films featuring dinosaurs
