= Vampirella (film) =

1996 film by Jim Wynorski

- Home video release poster
- Directed by: Jim Wynorski
- Written by: Gary Gerani
- Based on: Vampirella by Forrest J. Ackerman
- Produced by: Paul Hertzberg; Jim Wynorski; Angela Baynes
- Starring: Talisa Soto; Roger Daltrey; Brian Bloom
- Cinematography: Andrea Rossotto
- Edited by: Richard Gentner
- Music by: Joel Goldsmith
- Production companies: CineTel Films; Concorde Pictures; Sunset Films International
- Distributed by: Concorde Pictures
- Release date: September 28, 1996
- Running time: 82 minutes
- Country: United States
- Language: English
- Budget: $1 million

Vampirella is a 1996 American superhero film, which was part of the Roger Corman Presents series. It was based on the Vampirella comic book.

== Plot ==
30 centuries ago, on a distant planet called Drákulon, lies a civilized vampire society that drinks synthetic blood which flows through rivers across the planet. Their society's harmony is interrupted when Vlad Tepish, a rebel vampire who prefers the traditional practice of sucking the blood of others, along with his accomplices, murders all the members of the Council of Elders who govern Drákulon and then flees to Earth in order to create a race of vampires with their own ideals. Among the murdered elders was the father of Ella, who, with a desire for revenge, decides to follow Vlad's trail to Earth.

During her journey, Ella is forced to stay on Mars for a while and, meanwhile, remains in a deep lethargy. A long time later, she is found by astronauts and is taken to Earth. Upon arrival, she immediately begins to do everything possible to reach Vlad, who is now in Las Vegas and pretends to be a singer named Jamie Blood. In her eagerness, she coincides with a special police unit responsible for trapping extraterrestrial beings that intend to damage the Earth.

At first Ella, who now calls herself Vampirella, intends to continue with her revenge plan, but then allies with the special unit and must fight against Vlad and his vampires to save humanity from being turned into a horde of vampires, although this implies that she violates her own principles of not drinking blood from other beings.

== Cast ==
- Talisa Soto as Vampirella / Ella
- Roger Daltrey as Vlad Tepish / Jamie Blood
- Richard Joseph Paul as Adam Van Helsing
- Lee de Broux as Lieutenant Walsh
- Robert Clotworthy as Professor Steinman
- Brian Bloom as Demos
- Corinna Harney as Sallah
- Rusty Meyers as Quinn
- Tom Deters as Traxx
- Angus Scrimm as High Elder
- Tyde Kierney as Conrad Van Helsing
- David B. Katz as Forry Ackerman
- John Landis as Astronaut #1
- John Terlesky as Astronaut #2
- Forrest J Ackerman as Club Patron (uncredited)
- Gary Gerani as Council Vampire (uncredited)
- Jim Wynorski as Anchor (uncredited)

== Production ==
=== Hammer incarnation ===
James Warren first presented the idea to adapt Vampirella as a feature film to Hammer Films in the early 70s having been inspired by Barbarella. Michael Carreras of Hammer loved the idea and took on the project and set about auditioning potential actresses for the titular role. Hammer intended to release the film in 1976. The producers auditioned several actresses, including Caroline Munro and Valerie Leon for the role of Vampirella. Barbara Leigh came to an audition with the producers enthusiastically exclaiming "That's her, we've found her at last!". Leigh was excited at the prospect of playing Vampirella. Peter Cushing was also cast in the role as Pendragon, as well as Orson Welles and Donald Pleasence in other roles. Carreras claimed the film was not made due to Warren's refusal to relinquish merchandising rights, but Hammer had been in financial trouble prior making the deal for Vampirella and filed for bankruptcy not long after finalizing the deal. Munro and fellow Hammer Horror actress Judy Matheson were featured in a 2019 stage reading of the original script intended for Hammer's Vampirella film, starring Munro's daughter Georgina Dugdale in the title role. Hammer came close to making the film again in 1978 starring Leigh; Christopher Wicking wrote a script and John Hough was to direct. The film was going to be a co-production with American International Pictures but then head of production Samuel Z. Arkoff decided not to make the film. Despite the film not being made, Leigh took several publicity photos dressed as Vampirella that were published by Warren as well as appearing as the character at fan conventions none of which Warren paid her for prompting her to sue Warren to stop using her photos for publicity purposes and ultimately settling with him for $500. Leigh has stated that she regrets how ugly the legal situation with Warren got and looks back on the time fondly as despite never getting to actually do the movie, after retiring from acting, Leigh has stated Vampirella was the role for which she is most recognized by her fans.

In the early 1980s Peter Guber and Jon Peters had the rights when they were at Polygram. According to Gary Gerani, Tim Burton had expressed interest in adapting Vampirella as a major release at the time the rights were at Polygram.

=== Roger Corman Presents incarnation ===
Writer Gary Gerani said Talisa Soto (above) had screen tested a more comic accurate version of the costume, but the costume was altered as it kept falling off Soto during action sequences. Barbara Leigh who had been slated to play the character in an abandoned Hammer Film Production felt the costume change was unwarranted.

In 1988, Jim Wynorski inspired by the approaching release of Batman sought to acquire the rights to a comic book character like Batman that did not belong to a major publishing company and settled on Vampirella due to fond memories of reading the character in college. Wynorski tracked the Vampirella rights back to Harris Comics who weren't even aware they had the rights until Wynorski inquired and would only give him the rights with a sign off from Forrest J Ackerman which Wynorski acquired. After Batman became a blockbuster hit, Harris attempted to renege on their deal but followed through when Wynorski threatened to take them to court. Allegedly, Wynorski had purchased the rights with the intention of producing the film as a larger scale production built around an A-List actress with Cher floated as a possible candidate for the role. Additionally, Barbara Leigh claims that Wynorski wanted to cast Paula Abdul in the title role.

The Vampirella character had been dormant for years until Harris Comics successfully relaunched the character with a new comic series and two sets of trading cards which both reignited interest in a Vampirella film.

In 1995, Jim Wynorski set up the film to be developed as part of the second season for Showtime's Roger Corman Presents. Wynorski hired Gary Gerani, a trading card developer for Topps and the co-writer of Pumpkinhead, to write the screenplay as the two had known each other from Science Fiction conventions they frequently in the 70s and Wynorski knew how much Gerani loved the character. Gerani voiced excitement for writing Vampirella and was quoted:

Vampirella may have looked like a comic book superheroine — albeit the sexiest one who ever slipped on a pair of high-heeled boots — but she was light-years ahead of bland crusaders like Wonder Woman or Supergirl. She was also nothing like the anemic Morticia Addams type female vampire icon. In the end, Vampirella was a truly unique, one-of-a-kind creation.

Gerani also spoke of wanting to avoid the pitfalls of previous fronted superhero films noting failures like Sheena, Red Sonja, and Supergirl and said he hoped to come up with something like Xena: Warrior Princess which while not a comic book property embodied many of the tropes and aspects of the genre. Gerani further stated that the film would function as a backdoor pilot for an ongoing Vampirella TV series provided the reception was strong enough. According to Wynorski, Gerani wrote three drafts for the film. Wynorski rejected the first draft with no recollection of what it was about other than it wasn't what he had asked Gerani to write. A second draft was written more in line with Wynorski's specifications but as written would've required a $40 million budget and needed to be scaled back for the $1 million Showtime had given them for the project.

Prior to the casting of Talisa Soto, actresses Bo Derek, Tia Carrere, and Julie Strain had been considered for the role of Vampirella. Barbara Leigh who almost played Vampirella in the cancelled Hammer production called Wynorski and offered to come out of retirement for a role in the film but Wynorski said there weren't any roles in the film for her. Roger Daltrey was enthusiastic about playing Vlad Tepes/Jamie Blood as he felt the film would be a good way to honor his late friend and bandmate in The Who Keith Moon who had been a fan of Vampirella and introduced Daltrey to the character. Daltrey also composed the song "Bleed for Me" featured in the film. Wynorski cast Angus Scrimm after having worked with him on The Lost Empire and cast him against type as the High Elder. Wynorski described the character as embodying progressive liberalism and the best of humanity describing Scrimm as a "tall Edmund Gwenn" from Miracle on 34th Street.

After seeing the behind the scenes footage of the production, Leigh stated she had mixed feelings particularly regarding the changes to Vampirella's costume. Gerani said Soto had screen tested a more comic accurate costume but while the costume photographed well in publicity stills it would fall off whenever Soto had to do anything physical such as running or action sequences.

=== Filming ===
Jim Wynorski later called the film "a mess... a film I cannot watch. Everything went wrong. Everything!" His main concern was the casting of Talisa Soto. Wynorski said, "She's very pretty and she's very sexy. But she's not Vampirella. They forced me to use her. She just didn't have the body for the costume....I should have had Julie Strain. But they didn't think Julie Strain meant anything. So they put somebody wrong in the role."

Wynorski later said he should "have stopped and said let's just not do this. But, I was going to lose the rights in six months, so I did what I had to do. At least, I got the film made. But I should have said no." "It would have been so simple to cast the latest Baywatch bimbo in this part", said Gerani. "So now she's a vampire wonder woman from outer space with a Puerto Rican accent. What more could you ask for?" The director thought Roger Daltrey "was great... the actors were fine".

Filming took place in Las Vegas. "It was 110, everyday", said Wynorski. "Everybody was gambling, everybody was up all night. Everyone was blurry eyed. There was a thief on set who was stealing money. It was awful." "When you see how lousy those bat transformations are", said Gerani, "you'll realize that we're just a hip little million-dollar drive-in movie." "It was really a nasty, nasty picture to work on", said Wynorski. "And it came out badly, too... I wish I could go back now and redo it with the CGI of today. But even then, I just don't ever feel like going back to that.... It's got a good Joel Goldsmith score." "Given how absurd anything called Vampirella would be, the movie certainly doesn't insult your intelligence", says Gerani. "I think there's a nice emotional depth to the piece."

== Release ==
Vampirella premiered on Showtime on September 28, 1996 as part of Roger Corman Presents. A home video release followed on August 12, 1997.

== Reception ==
In a 2013 interview, director Jim Wynorski said Vampirella was the one film he regretted making. "I can look back on it today and just say 'Oh well', but back when the memories were fresh and the blood on the floor was yet to dry, it was painful to even edit", he said. "What went wrong??? Wrong choice for the star, massive union problems in Vegas, studio interference, theft, accidents, 112 degree heat, you name it, we had it happen. But at least I got to see Soupy Sales perform."

== Sequel ==
In the end credits of the film, a sequel was promised that would be titled Dark Avenger of Death; however, the sequel was never produced.

In 2021, Dynamite Entertainment announced a new feature film was in development, in addition to plans for television adaptations based on the Vampirella Universe. No new developments have been announced since then.
