= Desert Thunder =

- Directed by: Jim Wynorski
- Starring: Daniel Baldwin; Tim Abell
- Production company: Sunset Films International
- Release date: 1999
- Country: USA
- Language: English

Desert Thunder is a 1999 action film, It uses stock footage from Iron Eagle and Navy Seals.

== Cast ==
- Daniel Baldwin as Lee Miller
- Tim Abell as Bobby "Jet" Burkett
- Richard Tyson as Ralph Streets

== See also ==
- List of American films of 1999
