= Dinocroc vs. Supergator =

- DVD cover
- Written by: Mike MacLean; Jim Wynorski (as Jay Andrews)
- Directed by: Jim Wynorski (as Jay Andrews)
- Starring: David Carradine
- Theme music composer: Chuck Cirino; Al Kaplan; Jon Kaplan
- Country of origin: United States
- Original language: English

Production
- Executive producer: Roger Corman
- Producer: Brooks Kephart
- Cinematography: Samuel Brownfield
- Editor: Tony Randel
- Running time: 87 minutes

Original release
- Network: Syfy
- Release: June 26, 2010

Dinocroc vs. Supergator is a 2010 American science fiction horror television film that premiered on Syfy on June 26, 2010. This is one of David Carradine's final performances. The film was released on DVD and Blu-ray on July 12, 2011; It is the fourth and final installment in the Dinocroc film series, after Dinoshark released in the same year.

== Plot ==
In Drake Industries Research Lab in Hawaii, two creatures – Dinocroc and Supergator – are being studied.

However, Supergator breaks free from the lab and eats two scientists before escaping into the water. Dinocroc also breaks free by breaking the wall and crushing another scientist. It also eats two scientists and goes into the trees. Jason Drake calls an elite mercenary group to kill the creatures, but they are killed by Dinocroc. Drake then calls in Fish & Game hunter Bob Logan who is also known as "the Cajun" to kill the two creatures.

While spying on Drake's lab, Paul Beaumont meets a wildlife officer, Cassidy Swanson. While Drake has his private party, he meets up with a girl named Victoria Chase. Drake tells her to meet up with the Cajun. The Cajun meets with Victoria and they both go on a boat and down the river.

They hear a woman – Kimberly Taft – asking for help, and they help her in the jeep while Dinocroc chases after them. Cassidy and her father attempt to shoot at Supergator. Cassidy's father, Charlie, shoots Supergator's eye, presumably blinding it, and is devoured.

As Supergator eats Charlie, Cassidy gets in the car and drives off. Supergator then chases her all the way to the mill. As Supergator reaches the end of the tunnel, Bob and Paul blow it up with C-4 explosives so Supergator and Dinocroc cannot escape. The two reptiles engage in battle and in the melee they rupture the containers housing the mill's stores of sawdust. The fight continues, in which Dinocroc wins after knocking Supergator on its soft underbelly and attacking it.

Paul then runs forward to get in range so he can throw an explosive to set off all the sawdust. After Dinocroc kills Supergator, it spots Paul and walks towards him, as Paul hides in a trough filled with water, protecting himself from the explosives. The bomb explodes and ignites the sawdust to create a massive fireball, knocking back and killing Dinocroc. Paul is assumed to be killed as well, but he survives the attack. Before Paul and Cassidy leave, the camera then turns to Dinocroc and Supergator, both dead. As Bob, Paul and Cassidy walk away, it shows that in the mill are babies, of either Dinocroc or Supergator – possibly both.

== Cast ==
- Corey Landis as Paul Beaumont
- Amy Rasimas as Cassidy Swanson
- Rib Hillis as Bob "The Cajun" Logan
- John Callahan as Charlie Swanson
- Lisa Clapperton as Victoria
- Delia Sheppard as Kimberly Taft
- James Burns as FBI Agent
- David Carradine as Jason Drake
- Jeff Rector as Stewart Taft
- Adrian Alvarado as Lerner
- Carrie Stevens as Drake's Nurse
- Matt Riggle as Monroe
- Travis Richey as Marsden
- Shane Schoeppner as Scientist

== Production ==
Roger Corman gave Syfy the idea, but they did not know if they wanted to do it. Corman filmed it anyway and hoped that Syfy would buy the rights for television.

== Home video ==
Dinocroc vs. Supergator was released on DVD and Blu-ray on July 12, 2011, by Anchor Bay Entertainment.

== Reception ==
Ken Tucker of Entertainment Weekly called the film an "impeccable Saturday-night junk entertainment", but later added that "[he'd] rather watch a TV-movie like this than CSI: Miami or America's Got Talent any night."

== See also ==
- Nessie & Me, the character Jack O'Grady mentions the Dinocroc/Supergator and the Piranhaconda when he encounters Nessie at the beginning of the movie, but those films are not related to this film.
- List of killer crocodile films
