= Final Voyage =

- DVD cover
- Directed by: Jim Wynorski
- Written by: James Morley III; Andrew Stevens
- Produced by: Kevin O'Neill; Andrew Stevens; Noble Henry (as Jay Andrews)
- Starring: Dylan Walsh; Ice-T; Erika Eleniak; Rick Ducommun
- Cinematography: Ken Blakey
- Edited by: Michael Kuge
- Music by: David Wurst; Eric Wurst
- Distributed by: New City Releasing
- Release date: October 7, 1999
- Running time: 95 minutes
- Country: United States
- Language: English

Final Voyage is an action film released in 1999. The film stars Dylan Walsh, Ice-T, Erika Eleniak, and Claudia Christian. The film revolves around a terrorist attack on a cruise ship.

== Plot ==
During the Chinese New Year holiday season, a madman named Josef and his deadly gang of 8 modern-day pirates target a luxury cruise ship bound for Hawaii full of 2,500 wealthy passengers. The terrorists climb aboard after being dropped-off via seaplane and shoot the bridge deck crew, ship's cook and a waiter before terrorizing all the passengers in the Ball room during their elegant night with the captain. Josef then takes the Captain and cruise director hostage on the Bridge deck and force them to reveal where a vault containing $130 million is located. The passengers are taken hostage by two of the eight hijackers. Aaron Carpenter, a passenger and celebrity bodyguard, manages to remain undetected by the hijackers and makes a courageous rescue attempt accompanied by his wife and chief engineer.

The three shoot two of the hijackers and evade terrorist Max and her hijackers. When they hide in a cellar in the engine room, Aaron informs Josef via one of the hijacker's radio and explains his plan and that he has killed three of his hijackers. Josef then forces him to surrender by using the cruise director to instruct him. Since he refused, Josef executes the cruise director and orders the other hijackers to track down and kill Aaron and his gang, as well as break into the vault using C4 explosives. Aaron and his men track down the terrorists attempting to break into the vault. However, their task complicates when the terrorists bust into the ship's vault containing $255 million with explosives, which causes other explosives planted by them to detonate and rupture the ship's hull, opening a hole 10 meters wide and gets progressively bigger as more and more explosives detonate. Since the ship is taking on water very fast, and realizing his plan is a failure, Josef then executes the Captain and escapes.

Gloria Franklin, the woman Aaron was guarding, and chief engineer evacuate the 2500 passengers in the lifeboats and shoots all of the remaining hijackers while Aaron finds and fatally stabs Josef with a cooks Klever. Now all of the explosives have detonated and have blown several 20 meter holes in the ship's hull, sinking it much faster. With only seconds left, He and a remaining passenger jump off and climb into a lifeboat. He, his wife and all the passengers watch the ship tilt and slip beneath the Pacific Ocean.

== Cast ==
- Dylan Walsh as Aaron Carpenter, a passenger that defeats all the terrorists
- Ice-T as Josef, leader of 7 other modern-day pirates
- Erika Eleniak as Gloria Franklin
- Rick Ducommun as Jasper
- Claudia Christian as Max
- Heidi Schanz as Teri

== Production ==
The film was shot in Long Beach.

== Release ==
The film was released first on October 7, 1999, in Malaysia, and later premiered in video on Argentina. On 2000, the film was released in Canada, Germany, Spain, and United States.
