= Jim Wynorski =

American film director

- Born: Glen Cove, New York, U.S.
- Occupations: Film director, producer, screenwriter

Jim Wynorski is an American screenwriter, director, and producer. He is known for making B movies, action films, creature films, softcore pornography and exploitation films, such as Deathstalker II.

In 2009, the documentary Popatopolis, directed by Clay Westervelt (and named after Tom Popatopolous, one of Wynorski's pseudonyms) chronicled his work during the making of his softcore horror film The Witches of Breastwick. The film serves as a partial biography, with clips from many of his previous films, and includes interviews with Wynorski himself, as well as his contemporaries, cast and crew.

== Career ==
Jim Wynorski grew up in Long Island. He flunked out of film school and went to work at the fiction department of Doubleday Publishing from 1972 to 1977. Wynorski relocated to Los Angeles to pursue a career in the movie industry. He got a job as location manager on the TV show Breaking Away, but was fired during production. Flying back to Los Angeles, he met a fellow passenger who knew Roger Corman and arranged an introduction. Wynorski then went to work for Corman. He did publicity and began writing screenplays.

Wynorski 's first produced screenplay was Forbidden World (1982). He also wrote Sorceress for $1,000 and wrote and produced Screwballs (1983), a Porky's-style comedy.

=== Directorial debut and Roger Corman ===
Wynorski made his directing debut with The Lost Empire (1984).

His second film, Chopping Mall (1986), which Wynorski also produced and co-wrote, was made for Julie Corman. Julie's husband Roger Corman liked it, and hired Wynorski to make Deathstalker 2 in Argentina, then Big Bad Mama II (1987) with Angie Dickinson, and a remake of Not of this Earth (1988) with Traci Lords. He was creative consultant on Purple People Eater (1988).

Wynorski was given a $7 million budget to make The Return of Swamp Thing (1989) with Louis Jourdan. He then made Transylvania Twist and The Haunting of Morella back to back for Roger Corman.

He also made Sorority House Massacre II (1990) for Julie Corman, on sets left over from existing films. Roger Corman was impressed and got Wynorski to remake it as Sorority House Massacre III: Hard to Die. Corman "taught me all the lessons on how to make a film and how to make it look expensive when you don't have a lot of money," Wynorski says.

He worked on the scripts for Beastmaster 2: Through the Portal of Time (1991), House IV (1992), and Final Embrace (1992), but did not direct them.

He directed 976-Evil II (1992), which was produced by Paul Hertzberg, with whom Wynorski would frequently collaborate.

Wynorski made two films for Corman's Showtime series, Roger Corman Presents: a remake of The Wasp Woman (1995) and Vampirella (1996). Vampirella was an unhappy experience for him; in 2013 he said that film and Victim of Desire were the only films he regretted making in his career.

=== Fred Olen Ray ===
With his friend Fred Olen Ray he directed, wrote and produced Scream Queen Hot Tub Party (1991), starring Kelli Maroney, shot in one day. The two friends later collaborated on Dinosaur Island (1994) and co-executive produced Dark Universe (1993) and Biohazard: The Alien Force (1994) together. Ray produced Sorceress (1995), which Wynorski directed, and Wynorski helped produce Bikini Drive-In (1995), Fugitive Rage (1996), Friend of the Family II (1996), and Hybrid (1997), which Ray directed.

=== Family films ===
Wynorski made Munchie (1992), marking the film debut of Jennifer Love Hewitt; and its sequel, Munchie Strikes Back (1993). Hewitt was not part of the cast in the sequel, but he later directed Little Miss Millions (1993), which starred her. He also executive produced The Skateboard Kid 2.

In recent years, Wynorski has returned to the family film genre, making Nessie & Me (2016), which is in a shared universe with DinoCroc, Supergator, Dinocroc vs. Supergator, and Piranhaconda, due to the lead character referencing said films' title monsters, and Monster Cruise, from which many characters returned for Nessie & Me. He also directed A Doggone Christmas (2016), which spawned a sequel A Doggone Hollywood (2017).

=== Erotic thrillers ===
In the early 1990s he specialised in erotic thrillers, starting with Sins of Desire (1993). "I was good and I was fast," Wynorski said. "They knew the product would be solid... They were easy to make. It didn’t require any action. You could get them done well in 12 days. The trick was making them for low money. There was plenty of competition, so you had to be good and you had to get those big stars naked. Shannon Tweed, Andrew Stevens, Shannon Whirry, Tanya Roberts all started working double time."

Wynorski's other erotic thrillers included Point of Seduction: Body Chemistry III (1994), Victim of Desire (1995), Body Chemistry IV: Full Exposure (1995), and Virtual Desire (1995). He later directed The Escort III (1999).

In 1998, Wynorski appeared in a documentary Some Nudity Required where he said he got into film "for the money and the chicks" and said "breasts are the cheapest special effect in the business".

=== Sunset Films ===
Wynorski established his own production company, Sunset Films, which he ran with Andrew Stevens. It was a division of Cinetel Films. Sunset's films included Midnight Tease and its sequel; Vice Girls (1997); Sorceress II: The Temptress (1997).

He directed some of Sunset's films including Hard Bounty (1995), Demolition High (1996), Against the Law (1997), Storm Trooper (1998), and Desert Thunder (1999).

He did not direct the sequel to Demolition High, Demolition University (1997), but produced and co-wrote it.

=== Action movies ===
These were action movies, as were The Pandora Project (1998), Stealth Fighter (1999), Final Voyage (1999), Militia (2000), Rangers (2000), Extreme Limits (2000), and Ablaze (2001).

He produced some films that he did not direct, such as Fugitive Mind (1999); Sonic Impact (2000); Active Stealth (2000), Submerged (2000), Kept (2001), Air Rage (2001), Critical Mass (2001), Venomous (2001), all directed by Ray; Storm Catcher (2000); Jill Rips (2000) with Dolph Lundgren; Intrepid (2000), with James Coburn.

He often worked with producer and actor Andrew Stevens, who called in Wynorski to shoot additional scenes for Agent Red (2000).

Thy Neighbor's Wife (2001) was a thriller. Gale Force (2002), Lost Treasure (2003, with Stephen Baldwin) and Treasure Hunt (2003) were action films. Bad Bizness (2003) was Wynorski 's first film with a predominantly black cast.

Later action films he helped produce included Blue Demon (2004) and Sub Zero (2005).

=== The Bare Wench Project and parody films ===
In 2000, Wynorski made The Bare Wench Project, a sex parody of The Blair Witch Project. It was popular and led to several sequels. Wynorski made several other erotic parody movies, including Busty Cops (2004) and its several sequels, The Witches of Breastwick (2005) and its sequel, Alabama Jones and the Busty Crusade (2005), The Da Vinci Coed (2007), The Breastford Wives (2007), House on Hooter Hill (2007), The Devil Wears Nada (2009), Cleavagefield (2009), Para-Knockers Activity (2009), and The Hills Have Thighs (2010).

=== Creature films ===
In 2001, Wynorski returned to Roger Corman with Raptor (2001). He later made a series of "creature" films. For Corman he did some uncredited work on Wolfhound (2002). He made Project Viper (2002) for the Sci Fi Channel.

He later made Curse of the Komodo (2004) and its sequel, Komodo vs. Cobra (2005), Gargoyle: Wings of Darkness (2004), Cry of the Winged Serpent (2007), Dinocroc vs. Supergator (2010), Camel Spiders (2011), and CobraGator (2016).

== Filmography ==
=== Film ===
- Forbidden World (1982) - writer
- Sorceress (1982) - writer
- Screwballs (1983) - writer
- The Lost Empire (1984) - director, writer, producer
- Loose Screws (1985) a.k.a. Screwballs II - writer
- Chopping Mall (1986) - director, writer
- Deathstalker II (1987) - director, writer
- Big Bad Mama II (1987) - director, writer
- Not of This Earth (1988) - director, writer, producer
- The Return of Swamp Thing (1989) - director
- Transylvania Twist (1989) - director, writer
- Think Big (1989) - story
- The Haunting of Morella (1990) - director, writer (uncredited)
- Sorority House Massacre II (1990) - director (as "Arch Stanton")
- Sorority House Massacre III: Hard to Die (1990) - director (as "Arch Stanton"), producer
- Beastmaster 2: Through the Portal of Time (1991) - writer
- 976-Evil 2: The Astral Factor (1991) - director
- Munchie (1992) - director, writer
- Final Embrace (1992) - writer
- House IV (1992) - story
- Sins of Desire (1993) - director, story
- Little Miss Millions (1993) a.k.a. Home for Christmas - director, writer
- Dark Universe (1993) - co executive producer
- Biohazard: The Alien Force (1994) - executive producer
- Munchie Strikes Back (1994) - director, writer
- Dinosaur Island (1994) - director, producer
- The Skateboard Kid 2 (1995) - executive producer
- Sorceress (1995) - director
- Victim of Desire (1995) - director
- Midnight Tease II (1995) - executive producer
- Bikini Drive-In (1995) - executive producer
- Hard Bounty (1995) - director, producer
- Virtual Desire (1995) - director, producer
- Friend of the Family II (1996) - producer
- The Assault (1996) - director, producer
- Fugitive Rage (1996) - writer
- Hybrid (1997) - producer
- Vice Girls (1997) - producer
- Sorceress II: The Temptress (1997) - executive producer
- Against the Law (1997) - director
- The Pandora Project (1998) - director, writer
- Desert Thunder (1999) - director, producer
- Final Voyage (1999) - director (as Jay Andrews), producer, writer (as Noble Henry)
- Sonic Impact (1999) - producer
- Storm Catcher (1999) - producer
- Active Stealth (1999) - producer
- Fugitive Mind (1999) - executive producer
- Agent Red (2000) - director (uncredited reshoots), producer
- Crash Point Zero (2000) a.k.a. Extreme Limits - director
- Jill Rips (2000) - producer
- Intrepid (2000) - producer
- Submerged (2000) - producer
- Kept (2001) - producer
- Ablaze (2001) - director
- Air Rage (2001) - producer
- Thy Neighbor's Wife (2001) - director, story
- Critical Mass (2001) - producer
- Venomous (2001) - producer
- Lost Treasure (2003) - director
- Curse of the Komodo (2004) - director
- Blue Demon (2004) - producer
- Deep Evil (2004) - producer
- Crash Landing (2005) - director, writer
- Vampire in Vegas (2009) - director
- Fire from Below (2009) - director, writer, producer
- Lost in the Woods (2009) - director, producer
- Para-Knockers Activity (2009) - director
- Monster Cruise (2010) - director, writer
- Lucky Bastard (2014) - producer
- Sexually Bugged! (2014) - director
- Water Wars (2014) - director
- Nessie & Me (2016) - director, writer
- A Doggone Christmas (2016) - director, writer
- A Doggone Hollywood (2017) - director, writer
- CobraGator (2018) - director
- Giantess Battle Attack (2022) - director
- Bigfoot or Bust (2022) - director
- Murderbot (2023) - director

=== Direct-to-video ===
- Scream Queen Hot Tub Party (1991) - director, writer, producer (as "Arch Stanton")
- Ghoulies IV (1994) - director
- Point of Seduction: Body Chemistry III (1994) - director
- Body Chemistry IV: Full Exposure (1995) - director
- Demolition High (1996) - director
- Vampirella (1996) - director, producer
- Demolition University (1997) - producer
- Storm Trooper (1998) - director
- The Escort III (1999) - director (as Tom Popatopolous)
- The Bare Wench Project (2000) - director, writer, producer
- Rangers (2000) - director, producer
- Raptor (2001) - director, writer
- The Bare Wench Project 2: Scared Topless (2001) - director, writer, producer
- The Bare Wench Project 3: Nymphs of Mystery Mountain (2002) - director, writer, producer
- Gale Force (2002) - director, producer
- Wolfhound (2002) - director (some scenes, uncredited)
- Bad Bizness (2003) - director
- Cheerleader Massacre (2003) - director
- Treasure Hunt (2003) - director, writer
- The Thing Below (2004) - director, producer
- Gargoyle: Wings of Darkness (2004) - director, writer, producer
- Busty Cops (2005) - director, producer
- Alabama Jones and the Busty Crusade (2005) - director
- Sub Zero (2005) - director
- The Witches of Breastwick (2005) - director, writer, producer
- The Witches of Breastwick 2 (2005) - director, producer
- Busty Cops 2 (2006) - director
- The Breastford Wives (2007) - director, writer
- House on Hooter Hill (2007) - director, writer
- Strip for Action (2009) - director (uncredited)
- The Hills Have Thighs (2010) - director, writer (as Salvadore Ross)
- Attack of the 50 Foot CamGirl (2022) - director

=== TV movies ===
- The Wasp Woman (1995) - director
- Project Viper (2002) - director
- Bare Wench Project: Uncensored (2003) - director
- Lust Connection (2005) - director, writer, producer
- Komodo vs. Cobra (2005) - director, writer
- Bare Wench: The Final Chapter (2005) - director, writer, producer
- A.I. Assault (2006) - director, writer
- The Da Vinci Coed (2007) - director, writer, producer
- Cry of the Winged Serpent (2007) - director
- Bone Eater (2008) - director, writer
- The Lusty Busty Babe-a-que (2008) - director
- Cleavagefield (2009) - director, producer
- The Devil Wears Nada (2009) - director, writer
- Dinocroc vs. Supergator (2010) - director, writer
- Busty Cops and the Jewel of Denial (2010) - director, writer (Harold Blueberry)
- Busty Cops Go Hawaiian (2010) - director, writer (Harold Blueberry)
- Busty Coeds vs. Lusty Cheerleaders (2010) - director (as Sam Pepperman)
- Camel Spiders (2011) - director, writer, producer (as Jay Andrews)
- Piranhaconda (2012) - director
- Gila! (2012) - director
- Sexy Wives Sindrome (2013) - director, writer
- Pleasure Spa (2013) - director
- Hypnotika (2013) - director
- Sexipede! (2014) - director (as Sam Pepperman), writer
- Sharkansas Women's Prison Massacre (2015) - director, writer
- Shark Babes (2015) - director
- Scared Topless (2015) - director, writer
- Legend of the Naked Ghost (2017) - director, writer
