= Julie K. Smith =

American actress and model (born 1967)

- Born: August 18, 1967 (age 58)
- Other name: Julie Smith
- Occupation: Actress
- Height: 5 ft 6 in (1.68 m)

Julie K. Smith (born August 18, 1967) is an American actress and was the Penthouse Pet of the Month for February 1993.

== Career ==
As a child, Smith studied acting with Stella Adler. Smith appeared in a number of mainstream Hollywood films and B-movies before settling into the world of softcore pornography. She had an early starring role in the 1987 sex comedy Pretty Smart, alongside Patricia Arquette, as a rich sexpot at a private school in Greece, but her other roles in mainstream films of the late 1980s and early 1990s (such as The Last Boy Scout and Disorderlies) were minor non-speaking parts. She had an uncredited role in the 1976 Alan Parker film Bugsy Malone.

With her entry into softcore films came more leading roles. She became a staple of the softcore scene in the late 1990s, appearing in three episodes of Erotic Confessions in 1996–97, The Bare Wench Project series, and several Andy Sidaris films, such as L.E.T.H.A.L. Ladies: Return to Savage Beach.

Smith had a long-running professional relationship with director Jim Wynorski, having appeared in numerous films of his during the 1990s and 2000s. According to the documentary Popatopolis, Smith announced her retirement from acting in 2005 after the completion of The Witches of Breastwick. However, in 2007, she came out of retirement and resumed making films with Wynorski.
