= Triple B (film series) =

Film franchise (1985–1998)

The Triple B film series (standing for Bullets, Bombs, and Babes) is a series of twelve sexploitation action films released between the mid-1980s and late 1990s. The films follow the exploits of a mostly female office of the DEA primarily based out of Hawaii. Many of the films employ a buddy cop format. The movies were unique for their time period in focusing on a pair of female law enforcement officers versus two men, which was the standard approach to the subgenre.

During the course of its original run, the series had no official title, with the "Triple B" appellation being applied by fans of the franchise and later adopted by the producers. Also occasionally referred to as the "Lethal Ladies Series," the backronym L.E.T.H.A.L (Legion to Ensure Total Harmony and Law) was later applied to the department of the DEA for which the protagonists work, with its backstory expanded upon in the final two installments of the series, Day of the Warrior and Return to Savage Beach. This pair of films are marketed under the "L.E.T.H.A.L. Ladies" label in some territories.

Most films in the series focus on a team of women with proficiency in various black ops (most notably aviation and firearms training) taking on a variety of criminal organizations, usually drug dealers or arms traffickers. They are usually aided by a male protagonist, who often serves as comic relief or foil to the heroines. Seven of the films feature a male protagonist with the surname Abilene, played by four different actors and revealed later in the series to be siblings. The two films in the series not directed by Andy Sidaris reverse the formula by focusing on a new male protagonist, Chris Cannon (Bruce Penhall), who is aided by female sidekicks. The movies invariably feature copious amounts of nudity, sex, gun fu, pyrotechnics, plot twists, and occasional deus ex machinas, with most concluding in extended shootout or hand to hand combat sequences. Many of the early films were shot on location in Hawaii, with later installments being filmed in New Orleans, Las Vegas, and Dallas.

All but two films in the franchise are directed by Andy Sidaris. The films feature a roster of Playboy Playmates and Penthouse Pets, with seven of the ten Sidaris-directed movies starring 1984 Playmate Dona Speir as Special Agent Donna Hamilton, a high-ranking DEA agent working undercover as a cargo pilot in Molokai. Although many films feature returning characters, some actors appear throughout the series in different roles, often varying between heroic and villainous characters- Rodrigo Obregon appeared in ten films, only reprising a role once. There are varying degrees of effort to maintain series continuity between installments. For example, Donna's backstory remains consistent between entries, and three successive films - Do or Die, Hard Hunted, and Fit to Kill- are direct sequels to one another following the story arc of Donna's efforts to capture crime lord Kane. However, Kane is introduced as a yakuza played by Pat Morita, only for him to be retconned into a London gangster played by Geoffrey Moore between movies, with plot elements and the returning character of Kane's second-in-command, Silk (played by Carolyn Liu across four films), indicating they are meant to be the same character.

== Films ==
Film	U.S. release date	Director	Screenwriter(s)	Producer(s)
Malibu Express	March 1, 1985	Andy Sidaris	Andy Sidaris	Andy Sidaris
Hard Ticket to Hawaii	March 27, 1987	Andy Sidaris	Andy Sidaris	Arlene Sidaris
Picasso Trigger	February 25, 1988	Andy Sidaris	Andy Sidaris	Arlene Sidaris
Savage Beach	October 1, 1989	Andy Sidaris	Andy Sidaris	Arlene Sidaris
Guns	November 9, 1990	Andy Sidaris	Andy Sidaris	Arlene Sidaris
Do or Die	June 28, 1991	Andy Sidaris	Andy Sidaris	Arlene Sidaris
Hard Hunted	June 12, 1992	Andy Sidaris	Andy Sidaris	Arlene Sidaris
Fit to Kill	October 27, 1993	Andy Sidaris	Andy Sidaris	Arlene Sidaris
Enemy Gold	November 22, 1993	Christian Drew Sidaris	Wess Rahn & Christian Drew Sidaris	Andy Sidaris & Arlene Sidaris
The Dallas Connection	October 4, 1994	Christian Drew Sidaris	Christian Drew Sidaris	Andy Sidaris & Arlene Sidaris
Day of the Warrior	October 1, 1996	Andy Sidaris	Andy Sidaris	Arlene Sidaris & Christian Drew Sidaris
Return to Savage Beach	October 4, 1998	Andy Sidaris	Andy Sidaris	Arlene Sidaris & Christian Drew Sidaris

=== Malibu Express (1985) ===
Malibu Express is a 1985 American action film starring Darby Hinton, Sybil Danning, Lori Sutton, and Art Metrano. It was directed, written, and produced by Andy Sidaris and is the first installment in the Triple-B series. The film features 1980s Playboy Playmates Kimberly McArthur, Barbara Edwards, Lorraine Michaels, and Lynda Wiesmeier. The film is described as an "erotic spy tale" by Eleanor Mannikka in her review in All Movie Guide.

The film follows wealthy playboy/private investigator named Cody Abilene is hired by a government intelligence operative to investigate a lead into who is selling computer technology to the Russians. While investigating rich socialites, amorous naked vixens, and an ex-con with a penchant for blackmail, and keeping it all from his sexy lady cop friend Beverly Mcafee, Cody puts himself in the crosshairs of the traitorous tech spies who will gladly kill to stay in business.

=== Hard Ticket to Hawaii (1987) ===
Hard Ticket to Hawaii is a 1987 American action film and the sequel to the previous year's film Malibu Express, although it features no returning characters. The film established what would become many hallmarks of the series, including introducing Donna Hamilton (who would serve as the series protagonist for the next six entries) and buddy cop dynamics between a pair of female secret agents. This sequel introduces Ronn Moss as Rowdy Abilene, the brother of Darby Hinton's Cody Abilene from Malibu Express. Like the previous film, it features several former Playboy centerfolds, Playmates of the Month Speir (Miss March 1984), Carlton (Miss July 1985), Brimhall (Miss October 1985), and Patty Duffek (Miss May 1984). Paste magazine named the film the "best B movie of all time."

When two drug enforcement agents are killed on a private Hawaiian island, Donna and Taryn, two operatives for The Agency, accidentally intercept a delivery of diamonds intended for drug lord Seth Romero, who takes exception and tries to get them back. Soon other Agency operatives get involved, and a full-scale fight to the finish ensues, complicated by the escape of a very dangerous snake infected by deadly toxins from cancer-infested rats.

=== Picasso Trigger (1988) ===
Picasso Trigger is a 1988 American action film. It is a direct sequel to Hard Ticket to Hawaii with Dona Speir and Hope Marie Carlton returning as Donna and Taryn, but features another Abilene brother, Travis (played by Steve Bond) as its new lead. The film also stars Roberta Vasquez, Cynthia Brimhall, and Harold Diamond. The film was released in Philippines under the title Secret Agent 7.

Hawaiian agents Donna and Taryn join a Travis Abilene, who is out to stop a criminal mastermind and assassin seeking out a valuable piece of artwork.

=== Savage Beach (1989) ===
Savage Beach is a 1989 American action film. It is the first film in the series to feature Shane Abilene, played by Michael J. Shane, who would remain with the series up to Fit to Kill. Despite the inclusion of another Abilene brother, Donna and Taryn are featured as the main characters. It also marks the first appearance of Bruce Penhall as CIA agent Bruce Christian, who would join the agency and feature in future films. 1998's L.E.T.H.A.L. Ladies: Return to Savage Beach serves as a direct sequel to the plot of this film, but features only one returning character, Rodrigo Obregón as Rodrigo Martinez.

Donna and Taryn are sent to the Philippines to deliver a much needed vaccine. However, on their return journey they crash land on a remote island in the pacific and right into the middle of an adventure with a shipwrecked WW2 Japanese soldier, a secret army detachment headed by Captain Andreas and Philippine treasure hunters all involved with a lost detachment of gold bars lost during the war.

=== Guns (1990) ===
Guns is a 1990 American action film about a group of female agents who are sent to take out a South American gun runner. It is the first film since Malibu Express not to feature Hope Marie Carlton as Taryn, but features Roberta Vasquez as new agent Nicole Justin. It stars Erik Estrada, Dona Speir, Devin DeVasquez, Bruce Penhall, and Danny Trejo.

International crime lord Juan Degas, also known as Jack of Diamonds, stages a brutal murder to lure federal agents away from Hawaii in an attempt to smuggle assault weapons from China to South America through their territory.

=== Do or Die (1991) ===
Do or Die is a 1991 American action film starring Dona Speir, Roberta Vasquez, Cynthia Brimhall, Bruce Penhall, Pat Morita and Erik Estrada. Despite Estrada playing villain Juan Degas in the previous film, here he plays Richard 'Rico' Estevez - a member of the Agency.

A bounty has been placed on the head of agents Donna and Nicole by Japanese crime lord Masakana 'Kane' Kaneshiro and six teams of lethal assassins are hunting them down. It is up to their agency colleagues to thwart Kaneshiro's evil plans.

=== Hard Hunted (1992) ===
Hard Hunted is a 1992 American action film starring Dona Speir, Roberta Vasquez, Cynthia Brimhall, Bruce Penhall and Geoffrey Moore.

Martin Kane smuggles a nuclear trigger out of China and agrees to sell it to a terrorist in the Middle East. The US Intelligence Services send a special undercover agent to steal the device from Kane, but she fails and is found murdered. A team of three further agents, Donna Hamilton, Nicole Justin, and Edy Stark, is then sent in to try to retrieve the situation, fighting a gang of hi-tech smugglers with a deadly array of weaponry and erotic charms.

=== Fit to Kill (1993) ===
Fit to Kill is a 1993 American action film starring Dona Speir, Roberta Vasquez, Cynthia Brimhall, Julie Strain, Bruce Penhall, Chu Chu Malave and Geoffrey Moore. It is a direct sequel to Hard Hunted featuring returning villain Martin Kane (Geoffrey Moore). It was intended to be the last film in the series and is the last appearances of all of the agents from previous entries, although some cast members such as Julie Strain and Bruce Penhall would appear in later instalments as different characters.

International arms dealer Martin Kane seeks a Russian imperial diamond which was stolen by a Nazi officer from a Leningrad museum during WWII. It is up to the Agency to stop him in one last, daring mission.

=== Enemy Gold (1993) ===
Enemy Gold is a 1993 action/adventure film directed by Christian Drew Sidaris (Andy Sidaris's son, sometimes referred to simply as Drew Sidaris) and written by Wess Rahn and Sidaris. It is the first film in the series not to be directed by Andy Sidaris, although he did produce the film. Bruce Penhall stars as a new federal agent, Chris Cannon.

Three Federal agents go in search of gold supposedly hidden by Quantrell during the Civil War after they are suspended by a corrupt official for excessive force during a drug raid. Meanwhile, a vicious drug lord hires a lethal assassin to kill the three for interfering with his operations.

=== The Dallas Connection (1994) ===
The Dallas Connection is a 1994 action/adventure film and sequel to Enemy Gold directed by Christian Drew Sidaris. Bruce Penhall and Mark Barriere return as federal agents Chris Cannon and Mark Austin.

Scientists in charge of a sophisticated, state-of-the-art, military satellite are being assassinated one by one. It's up to a team of federal agents to protect the last surviving scientist able to activate the satellite before the assassin strikes again.

=== Day of the Warrior (1996) ===
Day of the Warrior is a 1996 action/adventure film, also known as L.E.T.H.A.L. Ladies: Day of the Warrior The film is written and directed by Andy Sidaris and starring Kevin Light and Julie Strain. It is the first film since Savage Beach not to feature Bruce Penhall in any role.

A team of female agents at top spy agency L.E.T.H.A.L (Legion to Ensure Total Harmony and Law) must stop the scheme of the Warrior, a former CIA agent turned criminal freelancer, who stole the agency's computer database and is now going after undercover agents one by one.

=== Return to Savage Beach (1998) ===
Return to Savage Beach is a 1996 action/adventure film, also known as L.E.T.H.A.L. Ladies: Return to Savage Beach is a 1998 action film written and directed by Andy Sidaris, a sequel to Sidaris' Day of the Warrior. It features the return of much of the original cast, including Marcus Bagwell reprising the role as Warrior but this time working on the side of the L.E.T.H.A.L. Ladies, as well as the addition of former Playboy Playmate Carrie Westcott as the mysterious Sofia. It is the final film in the series.

A stolen computer floppy disc filled with information about the location of a mythical treasure in Savage Island will lure both villains and L.E.T.H.A.L. Agents into a dangerous treasure hunt with a familiar face from the past pulling all the strings.

== Recurring cast and characters ==
Cast Member
Cast Member	Malibu Express	Hard Ticket to Hawaii	Picasso Trigger	Savage Beach	Guns	Do or Die	Hard Hunted	Fit to Kill	Enemy Gold	The Dallas Connection	Day of the Warrior	Return to Savage Beach
Darby Hinton	Cody Abilene											
Sybil Danning	Contessa Luciana											
Art Metrano	Matthew											
Lori Sutton	Beverly McAfee											
Skip Ward	Dick (uncredited)					Skip	Skip	Skip				
Ronn Moss		Rowdy Abilene										
Dona Speir		Donna Hamilton	Donna Hamilton	Donna Hamilton	Donna Hamilton	Donna Hamilton	Donna Hamilton	Donna Hamilton				
Hope Marie Carlton		Taryn	Taryn	Taryn								
Cynthia Brimhall		Edy Stark	Edy Stark	Edy Stark	Edy Stark	Edy Stark	Edy Stark	Edy Stark				
Wolf Larson		J.J. Jackson	J.J. Jackson									
Patty Duffek		"Pattycakes"	"Pattycakes"	"Pattycakes"								
Harold Diamond		Jade	Jade									
Rodrigo Obregón		Seth Romero	Miguel Ortiz	Rodrigo Martinez	Large Marge		Pico	Mikael Petrov	Santiago	Antonio Morales	Manuel	Rodrigo Martinez
Rustam Branaman		Kimo	Glen									
Steve Bond			Travis Abilene		Rustam							
Bruce Penhall			"Hondo"	Bruce Christian	Bruce Christian	Bruce Christian	Bruce Christian	Bruce Christian	Chris Cannon	Chris Cannon		
John Aprea			Salazar	Captain Andreas								
Roberta Vasquez			Pantera		Nicole Justin	Nicole Justin	Nicole Justin	Nicole Justin				
Kym Malin			Kym		Kym				Cowboy's Hostess	Cowboy's Hostess		
Liv Lindeland			Inga		"Ace"							
Michael J. Shane				Shane Abilene	Shane Abilene	Shane Abilene	Shane Abilene	Shane Abilene				
Al Leong				Fu			Raven					
Eric Chen				Erik	Ninja #2	Chen						
Paul Hospodar				Duke		Duke	Kidnapper					
Lisa London				Rocky	Rocky							
James Lew				Agent #1	Ninja #1	Lew						
Erik Estrada					Juan Degas / "Jack of Diamonds"	Richard "Rico" Estevez						
William Bumiller					Lucas	Lucas						
Chu Chu Malave					"Cubby"	Bodreaux	Wiley	"Evel"				
Richard Cansino					Tito	Herbert	"Coyote"	Kenevil			J.P.	
Pat Morita						Masakana "Kane" Kaneshiro						
Carolyn Liu						"Silk"	"Silk"	"Silk"			Alice	"Silk"
Ava Cadell						Ava	Ava	Ava				Ava
Geoffrey Moore							Kane	Kane				
Tony Peck							Lucas	Lucas				
Gerald Okamura							Commando			Fu	Fu	Fu
Cassidy Phillips									Thug #1	"Platter Puss"	Chaz	
Julie Strain								"Blu" Steele	Jewel Panther	"Black Widow"	Willow Black	Willow Black
Mark Barriere								Gregor	Mark Austin	Mark Austin		
Tom Abbott									"Rip"	Tom	Tom	
Ron Browning									"Slash"	Ron	Ron	
Julie K. Smith										"Cobra"	"Cobra"	"Cobra"
Christian Letelier											J. Tyler Ward	J. Tyler Ward
Shae Marks											"Tiger"	"Tiger"
Marcus Bagwell											"Warrior"	"Warrior"
Paul Logan												"Doc" Austin
Carrie Westcott												Sofia
Kevin Eastman												Harry "The Cat"
