= Fit to Kill =

- Directed by: Andy Sidaris
- Written by: Andy Sidaris
- Produced by: Arlene Sidaris
- Starring: Dona Speir; Roberta Vasquez; Bruce Penhall; Cynthia Brimhall; Julie Strain
- Cinematography: Mark Morris
- Edited by: Craig Stewart
- Music by: Richard Lyons
- Distributed by: Malibu Bay Films
- Release date: October 27, 1993
- Running time: 97 minutes
- Country: United States
- Language: English

Fit to Kill is a 1993 action adventure film starring Dona Speir, Roberta Vasquez, Cynthia Brimhall, Julie Strain, Bruce Penhall, Chu Chu Malave and Geoffrey Moore. It was written and directed by Andy Sidaris and is the eighth installment in the Triple B film series. The film serves as both the conclusion to the "Kane Trilogy" within the Triple B series (following Do or Die and Hard Hunted) and was originally intended to be the final installment in the franchise. It features the last appearances of recurring characters Donna Hamilton and Martin Kane. Two loosely connected films directed by Sidaris' son, Enemy Gold and The Dallas Connection, would be released before Sidaris resurrected the franchise for two final installments, Day of the Warrior and L.E.T.H.A.L. Ladies: Return to Savage Beach.

== Plot ==
A security agency becomes involved in a violent conflict over possession of a rare diamond.

== Cast ==
- Dona Speir as Donna Hamilton
- Roberta Vasquez as Nicole Justin
- Bruce Penhall as Bruce Christian
- Geoffrey Moore as Kane (credited as R.J. Moore)
- Tony Peck as Lucas
- Cynthia Brimhall as Edy Stark
- Julie Strain as "Blu" Steele
- Rodrigo Obregón as Mikael Petrov (credited as Rodrigo Obregon)
- Aki Aleong as Chang
- Ava Cadell as Ava
- Mark Barriere as Gregor
- Craig Ng as Po (credited as Craig Ryan Ng)
- Chu Chu Malave as "Evel"
- Richard Cansino as Kenevil
- Skip Ward as Skip
- Carolyn Liu as "Silk"
- Michael J. Shane as Shane Abilene (credited as Michael Shane)
- Brett Baxter Clark as Burke
- Sandra Wild as Sandy
- John Nelson as Emerson
- Nicholas Georgiade as Nick, The Robber (credited as Nick Georgiade)
- Christian Drew Sidaris as Driver (credited as Christian Sidaris)
- Roy Summerset as German General
- Gerald Okamura as Commando
- Richard Rabago as Commando #2
- Don Yee as Commando #3
- Eric Anthony as Gunman
- Shawn Rooney as Shiwan
- Naida Albright as Female Commando
- David Parks as Doorman (credited as Dave Parks)
- Bill Perkins as Pawn Shop Owner
- Richard Palmer as Guard

== Reception ==
The film is said to belong to the period of Sidaris's less achieved productions.

A review goes as far as to say that it "continues his series of female spy movies, which usually serve as just an excuse to get women out of their clothes. This one has less flesh than usual, so there's nothing to watch at all."
