= Picasso Trigger =

1988 American action film

- Theatrical release poster
- Directed by: Andy Sidaris
- Written by: Andy Sidaris
- Produced by: Arlene Sidaris
- Starring: Steve Bond; Dona Speir; Hope Marie Carlton; Roberta Vasquez; Harold Diamond; Cynthia Brimhall
- Cinematography: Howard Wexler
- Edited by: Michael Haight
- Music by: Gary Stockdale
- Release date: February 25, 1988 (USA)
- Running time: 99 minutes
- Country: United States
- Language: English

Picasso Trigger (released in the Philippines as Secret Agent 7) is a 1988 action film starring Steve Bond, Dona Speir, Hope Marie Carlton, Roberta Vasquez, Cynthia Brimhall, and Harold Diamond. It was written and directed by Andy Sidaris and it's the third installment in the Triple B film series.

== Plot ==
Hawaiian agents Donna and Taryn join a global-team leader out to stop a criminal mastermind.

== Cast ==
- Steve Bond as Travis Abilene
- Dona Speir as Donna Hamilton
- Hope Marie Carlton as Taryn
- Roberta Vasquez as Pantera
- Harold Diamond as Jade
- John Aprea as Salazar
- Bruce Penhall as Hondo
- Cynthia Brimhall as Edy
- Dennis Alexio as Toshi Lum
- Keith Cooke as Clayton
- Wolf Larson as Jimmy-John
- Andy Sidaris as Whitey
- Kym Malin as Kym
- Patty Duffek as Patticakes
- Liv Lindeland as Inga

== Release ==
Picasso Trigger was released in the United States in February 1988. In the Philippines, the film was released as Secret Agent 7 on March 18, 1992.

== Reception ==
The film gained retrospective cult following.

== See also ==
- Girls with guns
