= Do or Die (film) =

1991 action film directed by Andy Sidaris

- Promotional film poster
- Directed by: Andy Sidaris
- Written by: Andy Sidaris
- Produced by: Andy Sidaris
- Starring: Pat Morita; Cynthia Brimhall; Erik Estrada
- Cinematography: Mark Morris
- Edited by: Michael Haight
- Music by: Richard Lyons
- Distributed by: Malibu Bay Films
- Release date: June 28, 1991
- Running time: 97 minutes
- Country: United States
- Language: English

Do or Die is a 1991 action film starring Cynthia Brimhall, Pat Morita and Erik Estrada. It was directed, written and produced by Andy Sidaris. It's the sixth installment in the Triple B film series.

== Plot ==
In Hawaii, L.E.T.H.A.L. agents Donna Hamilton and Nicole Justin are confronted by underworld businessman Kane. As retribution for damaging his organization, Kane has devised a "game" to hunt and kill Hamilton and Justin using six teams of professional assassins. They call their superior Lucas, who orders them to leave for Las Vegas and meet up with a contact for further instructions. From his headquarters in Honolulu Kane and his mistress, Silk orders the assassins into action while they keep track of their every move with a tracking device secretly implanted into Hamilton's wristwatch.

The first team fires on Hamilton and Justin's Jeep from a helicopter as they drive to the airport. After jumping out and taking cover, Justin takes down the helicopter with a missile-firing walking stick. They pilot a small plane to Honolulu, don disguises, and catch their flight. At Barksdale Air Force Base, Lucas meets with Capt. Bruce Christian and Col. Richard Estevez, whom he has personally recruited to help him stop Kane.

Hamilton and Justin meet their contact at an RC air show outside of Las Vegas. He tells them an airplane is waiting for them at Henderson Airport and sends them off with a large-scale remote-controlled Huey helicopter.

However, Kane's second team has tracked their location and fire on them on their way to the airport. During an off-road desert car chase, Christian and Estevez join in and pursue the assassins in a dune buggy. Hamilton and Nicole are saved when Estevez fires a rocket launcher at the assassin's car. They all meet up at the airport and take off.

Kane is informed of the failure of the second team and begins to lose faith in his plan. While airborne Christian and Estevez contact Lucas and tell him they will arrive in Louisiana by dawn. Lucas sets up a meeting at Big Pines Lodge for noon the next day. After a sultry performance, Lucas informs his country music singing girlfriend and fellow agent Edy Stark to get ready for their new assignment.

Hamilton and Justin split up and take a seaplane while Christian and Estevez drive to the meeting. Kane already has his third team at the lodge disguised as chefs. As they wait for Lucas and Edy, Hamilton mentions two additional agents, Shane and rookie Atlanta Lee, will be joining them. As lunch is served, a cat meows at Justin's leg. She feeds it a piece of food, and after one last meow, the cat falls dead from ingesting poison.

Exposed the assassins run into the woods. Lucas, Edy, Shane, and Atlanta arrive and join in the chase. The assassins attempt to escape by motorboat, but before they can get onto the water, Hamilton and Justin drop a grenade from their seaplane and blow it up. They are captured alive and arrested.

Kane arrives back at his headquarters and begins to reveal to Silk his larger scheme to manipulate the American stock market but is interrupted with news of the third team's failure. Lucas and the others start to suspect a mole in the group. He decides to take the agents to a secure lake house. While preparing to leave Estevez kisses Hamilton but she rebuffs his advances.

The next morning, two men ride their dirt bikes on a dock. While pretending to fish, one of the men assembles a sniper rifle, aims it at Agent Hamilton but misses. The fourth team attempts to escape while Christian and Estevez give chase on dirt bikes. The first assassin crashes and is shot by Christian while Estevez kills the second with a grenade disguised as a baseball.

Lucas, Edy, Shane, and Atlanta plan to leave early the next morning by boat to pick up rifles. While synchronizing their watches, Hamilton lends hers to Edy. While headed back, the fifth team, thinking they have tracked Hamilton and Justin, appear on jet skis and fire at their boat. Lucas and Edy using the new rifles kill the fifth team.

Lucas decides to move again to his home in Dallas. Estevez accuses Atlanta of being a mole. At the same time, Hamilton's wristwatch burns Edy as she turns on a microwave, dropping it to the floor. Estevez picks it up and Justin discovers Kane's tracking device that has been revealing their every move.

Kane calls Lucas, offering a final challenge of hand-to-hand combat between Hamilton, Justin, and his final team. Lucas hangs up. After a romantic night with Estevez, Hamilton calls Kane to accept his challenge. The next morning, they are ambushed in the woods by two ninjas. Hamilton and Justin run away, but they catch up. Justin hits one of the assassins with a baseball bat while Hamilton throws a ninja star into the leg of the other.

Despite their injuries, the assassins track them to an outhouse and hear whispering inside. Instead of the agents, it's two dummies with wigs and a tape recording of their voices. With Estevez controlling the remote-controlled helicopter, Hamilton and Justin each fire missiles on the outhouse, killing the final team. Kane watches helplessly as his computer informs him that he has lost his "game".

While celebrating Estevez and Lucas reveals how L.E.T.H.A.L. can now track Kane with Silk working as their informant. It is decided not to arrest Kane but to keep track of his whereabouts and continue to disrupt his operations.

== Cast ==
- Pat Morita as Masakana "Kane" Kaneshiro
- Erik Estrada as Richard "Rico" Estevez
- Dona Speir as Donna Hamilton
- Roberta Vasquez as Nicole Justin
- Bruce Penhall as Bruce Christian
- Cynthia Brimhall as Edy Stark
- William Bumiller as Lucas
- Michael J. Shane as Shane Abilene (credited as Michael Jay Shane)
- Pandora Peaks as Atlanta Lee (credited as Stephanie Schick)
- Carolyn Liu as Silk
- Richard Cansino as Hebert
- Chu Chu Malave as Bodreaux
- Ava Cadell as Ava
- Skip Ward as Skip
- James Lew as Lew
- Eric Chen as Chen
- Paul Hospodar as Duke
- H.D. Wood as Woody
- Christian Drew Sidaris as Spencer (credited as Drew Sidaris)
- Rodd Saunders as Dudley
- Bill Allen as Fiddle Player
- Louis Ballis as Washboard
- Tony Bucci as Accordionist
- Bonnie McFarland as Big Pines Waitress
- Betty Williams as Big Pines Diner
- George Williams as Big Pines Diner
- Trigger as Cat

== Reception ==
The film, as most of its director's creations, gained a retrospective cult following.

== See also ==
- Girls with guns
