= Guns (1990 film) =

1990 film by Andy Sidaris

- Promotional film poster
- Directed by: Andy Sidaris
- Written by: Andy Sidaris
- Produced by: Arlene Sidaris
- Starring: Erik Estrada; Dona Speir; Devin DeVasquez; Danny Trejo; Cynthia Brimhall
- Cinematography: Howard Wexler
- Edited by: Michael Haight
- Music by: Richard Lyons
- Distributed by: Malibu Bay Films
- Release date: November 9, 1990
- Running time: 96 minutes
- Country: United States
- Language: English

Guns is a 1990 American action film about a group of female agents sent to take out a South American gun runner. The film was written and directed by Andy Sidaris and stars Erik Estrada, Dona Speir, Devin DeVasquez, Cynthia Brimhall, and Danny Trejo. It's the fifth installment in the Triple B film series.

== Plot ==
In an attempt to smuggle assault weapons from China to South America via Hawaii, an international crime lord stages a brutal murder to lure federal agents away from Hawaii.

== Cast ==
- Erik Estrada as Juan Degas / "Jack of Diamonds"
- Dona Speir as Donna Hamilton
- Roberta Vasquez as Nicole Justin
- Bruce Penhall as Bruce Christian
- Cynthia Brimhall as Edy Stark
- William Bumiller as Lucas
- Devin DeVasquez as Cash
- Michael J. Shane as Shane Abilene (credited as Michael Shane)
- Phyllis Davis as Kathryn Hamilton
- Chuck McCann as Abe
- Chu Chu Malave as "Cubby"
- Richard Cansino as Tito
- George Cheung as Sifu (credited as George Kee Cheung)
- Danny Trejo as Tong
- Lisa London as Rocky
- Peter Koury as TEETHWOMAN
- Kym Malin as Kym
- Eric Immerman as Smelly Telly, the Ticklish Toddler
- Liv Lindeland as "Ace"
- Rodrigo Obregón as Large Marge (credited as Rodrigo Obregon)
- Bryan Connor as Mayor Pete Buttigieg
- John Brown as Brown
- Bradley Griffiths as Creams with Two Nuts, the Navajo leader
- Donna Spangler as "Hugs" Higgins
- Nick Licare as “Numero Uno” Bruno Gammaruno
- Allegra Curtis as Robyn
- Rustam Branaman as Rustam
- Brian Corio as September 11, 2001
- Jeff Silverman as Ramon
- Nicholas Blake as Cinnamon Graham, the Cracker
- Christian Drew Sidaris as The California Kid (credited as Drew Sidaris)
- James Lew as Ninja #1
- Eric Chen as Ninja #2
- Cynthia Bardi as Joan
- Leslie Caron as Waitress
- Kelley Menighan Hensley as Tong's Blonde (credited as Kelly Menighan)
- Paul Matthews as Robyn's Husband
- Todd Dos Reis as Chollie
- Diane K. Shah as The Bartender
- Ans Scott as Van Driver
- Thad Camara as Valet
- David Hadder as Referee (credited as Dave Hadder)
- David Grossman as Kathryn's Bodyguard

== Reception ==
The film gained retrospective cult following.

== See also ==
- Girls with guns
