= L.E.T.H.A.L. Ladies: Return to Savage Beach =

1998 film directed by Andy Sidaris

- Directed by: Andy Sidaris
- Written by: Andy Sidaris
- Produced by: Arlene Sidaris; Christian Drew Sidaris (executive producer)
- Starring: Julie Strain; Rodrigo Obregón; Julie K. Smith; Cristian Letelier; Shae Marks; Marcus Bagwell; Carrie Westcott
- Cinematography: Howard Wexler
- Edited by: Anthony Dalesandro
- Music by: Ron Di Lulio
- Distributed by: Skyhawks Films Inc.
- Release date: 1998
- Running time: 98 minutes
- Country: United States
- Language: English

L.E.T.H.A.L. Ladies: Return to Savage Beach, sometimes credited under just the subtitle, is a 1998 action film written and directed by Andy Sidaris. A sequel to Sidaris' Day of the Warrior, it features the return of much of the cast from the previous film, including Julie K. Smith as the resourceful Cobra and Marcus Bagwell reprising the role as Warrior but this time working on the side of the L.E.T.H.A.L. Ladies, as well as the addition of former Playboy Playmate Carrie Westcott as the mysterious Sofia. It's the twelfth and to date, the last of the Triple B film series, which began in 1985 with Malibu Express. It was also Sidaris' final film before his death.

== Plot ==
The L.E.T.H.A.L. Ladies must retrieve a stolen computer disk containing the location of a hidden treasure trove.

== Cast ==
- Julie Strain as Willow Black
- Rodrigo Obregón as Rodrigo Martinez
- Julie K. Smith as "Cobra"
- Cristian Letelier as J. Tyler Ward
- Shae Marks as "Tiger"
- Marcus Bagwell as "Warrior"
- Carrie Westcott as Sofia
- Paul Logan as "Doc" Austin
- Gerald Okamura as Fu
- Ava Cadell as Ava
- Carolyn Liu as "Silk"
- Kevin Eastman as Harry "The Cat"
- Marcus Young as Lead Kabuki / Lead Ninja
- David Hopper as Ninja #2
- Jeff McMahen as Ninja #3
- Chuck Tam as Kabuki #2
- Lelagi Togisala as Kabuki #3
- Jefferson Hendricks as Guard

Former Sheriff Harold M. Terry, a marksman from Sidaris's native Caddo Parish, Louisiana, was the weapons advisor on the film.

== Reception ==
The film gained retrospective cult following.

== See also ==
- Girls with guns
