= Hard Ticket to Hawaii =

1987 film directed by Andy Sidaris

- Theatrical release poster
- Directed by: Andy Sidaris
- Written by: Andy Sidaris
- Produced by: Arlene Sidaris
- Starring: Ronn Moss; Dona Speir; Hope-Marie Carlton; Cynthia Brimhall; Harold Diamond; Rodrigo Obregon
- Cinematography: Howard Wexler
- Edited by: Michael Haight
- Music by: Gary Stockdale; Kevin Klinger
- Distributed by: Malibu Bay Films
- Release date: March 1987
- Running time: 100 minutes
- Country: United States
- Language: English

Hard Ticket to Hawaii is a 1987 American low-budget action film written and directed by Andy Sidaris, and starring Ronn Moss, Dona Speir, Hope Marie Carlton, Cynthia Brimhall, and Harold Diamond. The second installment in Sidaris' Triple B film series, it features several former Playboy Magazine centerfolds, Playmates of the Month Speir (Miss March 1984), Carlton (Miss July 1985), Brimhall (Miss October 1985), and Patty Duffek (Miss May 1984).

The movie was released on DVD on October 23, 2001.

== Plot ==
Two drug enforcement agents are killed on a private Hawaiian island. Donna and Taryn, two operatives for The Agency (Molokai Cargo), accidentally intercept a delivery of diamonds intended for drug lord Seth Romero, who takes exception and tries to get them back. Soon, other Agency operatives get involved, and a full-scale fight to the finish ensues, complicated here and there by a very dangerous snake infected by deadly toxins from cancer-infested rats.

== Cast ==
- Ronn Moss as Roddy Abilene (sometimes mistakenly referred to as Rowdy)
- Dona Speir as Donna
- Hope Marie Carlton as Taryn
- Cynthia Brimhall as Edy
- Wolf Larson as J.J. Jackson
- Harold Diamond as Jade
- Yukon King as "Cat"
- Herb Burdett as "Dog"

== Reception ==
The film's over-the-top violence, cheesy dialogue, unintentional humor, and overall absurdity has earned it a cult following. In 2014, Paste magazine named the film the "best B movie of all time".

The film was featured on the podcast How Did This Get Made? in 2017.
