= Malibu Express =

1985 film by Andy Sidaris

- Theatrical release poster
- Directed by: Andy Sidaris
- Written by: Andy Sidaris
- Produced by: Andy Sidaris
- Starring: Darby Hinton; Sybil Danning; Art Metrano; Shelley Taylor Morgan; Brett Clark; Niki Dantine; Michael Andrews; Lori Sutton; Barbara Edwards; Kimberly McArthur; Lorraine Michaels; Lynda Wiesmeier; John Brown; Richard Brose; Suzanne Regard; Abb Dixon; Busty O'Shea; Randy Rudy; John Alderman; Robert Darnell; Peggy Ann Filsinger; Robyn Hilton; Peter Knecht; Ruth Stamer; Les Steinmetz; Jeanine Vargas
- Cinematography: Howard Wexler
- Edited by: Craig Stewart; Howard Wexler
- Music by: Henry Strzelecki
- Production company: Malibu Bay Films
- Distributed by: Malibu Bay Films
- Release date: March 1985
- Running time: 101 minutes
- Country: United States
- Language: English

Malibu Express is a 1985 American action film starring Darby Hinton, Sybil Danning, Lori Sutton, and Art Metrano. It was directed, written, and produced by Andy Sidaris and is the first installment in the Triple B film series. The film features 1980s Playboy Playmates Kimberly McArthur, Barbara Edwards, Lorraine Michaels, and Lynda Wiesmeier in its cast, as well. In it, Danning "cinched her image as B-budget bad girl". Regis and Joy Philbin cameo as talk-show hosts.

== Plot ==
A wealthy playboy/private investigator named Cody Abilene is hired by a government intelligence operative to investigate a lead into who is selling computer technology to the Russians. While investigating rich socialites, amorous naked vixens, and an ex-con with a penchant for blackmail, and keeping it all from his sexy lady cop friend Beverly Mcafee, Cody puts himself in the crosshairs of the traitorous tech spies who will gladly kill to stay in business. The scope of the conspiracy is revealed after Cody and Beverly make love at a suspect's beach house, only to find a pair of hitmen gunning for them as they get dressed. Gunplay, car chases, and races ensue.

== Cast ==
- Darby Hinton as Cody Abilene
- Sybil Danning as Contessa Luciana
- Art Metrano as Matthew
- Niki Dantine as Lady Lillian Chamberlain
- Michael Andrews as Stuart Chamberlain
- Shelley Taylor Morgan as Anita Chamberlain
- Lorraine Michaels as Liza Chamberlain
- Brett Clark as Shane
- Lori Sutton as Beverly McAfee
- Lynda Wiesmeier as June Khnockers
- Kimberly McArthur as Faye
- Barbara Edwards as May
- Abb Dickson as P.L. Buffington
- Busty O'Shea as Doreen Buffington
- Randy Rudy as Bobo Buffington
- Richard Brose as Mark
- John Brown as Luke
- Suzanne Regard as Sally "Sexy Sally"
- John Alderman as Lieutenant Arledge
- Robyn Hilton as Maid Marian
- Les Steinmetz as Johnathan Harper
- Robert Darnell as Douglas Wilton
- Jeanine Vargas as Rodney
- Peter Knecht as Peter
- Harry Hauss as Helicopter Pilot
- Ruth Stamer as Answering Service Girl
- Peggy Ann Filsinger as Peggy
- Regis Philbin as Regis Philbin
- Joy Philbin as Joy Philbin
- Niki Patterson as Computer Operator

== Production ==
=== Filming ===
Exteriors were shot in Beverly Hills, around Los Angeles such as Sunset Boulevard, Willow Springs Raceway and the Mojave Desert.

=== Soundtrack ===
The film's music was composed by Henry Strzelecki, with Ronny Light producing the soundtrack which featured Strzelecki on bass, Bucky Barrett and Tommy Jones on guitar, Bobby Thompson playing guitar and banjo, Weldon Myrick playing guitar and Dobro, Barry Walsh on piano, Dale Morris on fiddle, Terry McMillan on harmonica and percussion, and Kenny Buttrey on drums.

== Releases ==
The film was first released in March 1985, then on DVD in 2002. It then appeared in two DVD collections, Andy Sidaris Collection, Vol. 1 (of six discs) in 2003, and Triple B Collection, Vol. 1 in 2005. The film was released on Blu-ray on April 16, 2019, by Mill Creek Entertainment; it features a 4K film transfer and HD widescreen restoration.

== Reception ==
Malibu Express is described as a "routine erotic spy tale" by Eleanor Mannikka of All Movie Guide. The Video Movie Guide 2001 rated the movie with a single "turkey", amazed that the movie got an "R" rating, "since it's clearly soft porn". TV Guide gave the film two stars. Barbara Edwards' appearance in the hero's shower is cited as "one of the hottest topless lesbian shower scenes in the long and hot tradition of lesbian shower scenes".

== Connections to other films ==
The material from the film was reworked from a previous Sidaris film, Stacey (1973). The role of Stacey Hanson (Anne Randall) was divided into two new characters: private detective protagonist Cody Abilene (Darby Hinton) and his girlfriend June Khnockers (Lynda Wiesmeier).

The openings of both films depict their respective female race car drivers in the finish of a practice race. Both films then have them getting out of uniform. Stacey is the protagonist, though, while June serves mostly as the source of a recurring joke in her film: "Knockers with an "h"?". June can still reliably drive a high-performance race car, but Cody performs most of Stacey's functions in the film.

The discreet homosexual nephew John (John Alderman) turns into Stuart (Michael A. Anderson), a drag queen, in the second film. In both films, the detective follows the character into a gay bar. The difference is that in the first film, John wears regular clothes, while in the second, Stuart is in full drag. Cody laughs while dictating notes into a recorder, while Frederick says that Stuart has great legs. Stuart is more of a cartoonish gay stereotype than John.

The youthful niece Pamela (Cristina Raines) turns into the bit older niece Liza (Lorraine Michaels) in the second film. Liza has her own sex scene with the houseboy Shane (Brett Clark). The difference in age was probably decided to allow this sex scene and more nudity than would be acceptable from a teenager.

The second film adds a character with no counterpart in the original: Contessa Luciana (Sybil Danning). Contessa has a romantic night with Cody, before he moves into his next assignment. The relationship to the family is unspecified, but she turns out to have murdered Shane. She is beyond the reach of the law and suffers no ill consequences for her murder.

== See also ==
- Girls with guns
