= Andy Sidaris =

American filmmaker and actor (1931–2007)

- Born: Andrew William Sidaris; February 20, 1931; Chicago, Illinois, U.S.
- Died: March 7, 2007 (aged 76); Beverly Hills, California, U.S.
- Education: Southern Methodist University (BA)
- Occupations: Director; producer; screenwriter
- Years active: 1950–1998
- Spouse: Arlene Sidaris
- Children: 3
- Website: www.andysidaris.com

Andrew William Sidaris (February 20, 1931 – March 7, 2007) was an American television and film director, producer, and screenwriter. After a pioneering career directing televised sports beginning in the 1960s, Sidaris wrote and directed a successful series of action B-movies from 1985 to 1998—dubbed the "Bullets, Bombs, and Babes" series—that featured Playboy Playmates and Penthouse Pets in starring roles. In 2014, Paste magazine named one such picture, Hard Ticket to Hawaii, the best B-movie of all time.

== Early life ==
Andrew William Sidaris was born in 1931 in Chicago, Illinois, to first-generation Greek immigrants. He grew up in Shreveport, Louisiana, where he played halfback and quarterback on the football team at Byrd High School. He graduated from Southern Methodist University in 1955 with a Bachelor of Arts degree in speech and theater.

== Career ==
=== Television ===
Sidaris began his television career in 1950, working as a stage manager for WFAA in Dallas, Texas, before being promoted to director six months later. In 1959, he moved to Los Angeles to work for ABC Sports, beginning with directing AFL football games in 1960. Sidaris also directed the first telecast of the Wide World of Sports in 1961, Monday Night Football games, as well as ABC's coverage of every Olympics from the 1964 Winter Games in Innsbruck to the 1988 Winter Games in Calgary, winning several Emmy Awards in the process.

While directing college football games on ABC, Sidaris pioneered what became known as the "honey shot," close-ups of cheerleaders and attractive female fans in the stands at sporting events. He was also at the forefront of the development of instant replay, slow-motion replays, and split-screen views.

Sidaris entered the field of scripted television in the mid-1970s, directing episodes of programs such as Kojak and The Hardy Boys/Nancy Drew Mysteries.

=== Film ===
In 1973, Sidaris expanded into film, directing the exploitation picture Stacey, followed by the action film Seven in 1979.

Beginning with 1985's Malibu Express, Sidaris wrote and directed a series of lighthearted B-movie action pictures that featured buxom, gun-toting Playboy Playmates and Penthouse Pets in starring roles. Most of the "Bullets, Bombs, and Babes" films chronicled the adventures of a team of secret agents—frequently played by Dona Speir, Hope Marie Carlton, Cynthia Brimhall, Roberta Vasquez, and Julie Strain—working in exotic tropical locations. The series' trademarks included frequent displays of female nudity, muscled male co-stars, and over-the-top, tongue-in-cheek death scenes, such as in 1987's Hard Ticket to Hawaii, where a skateboard-riding assassin is blown up by a rocket launcher while he clutches a blowup doll. In 2014, Paste magazine named Hard Ticket to Hawaii the best B-movie of all time.

== Personal life and death ==
Sidaris had three children—Drew, Alexa, and Stacey—with his wife and production partner, Arlene. They resided in Beverly Hills, California, where Sidaris died of throat cancer on March 7, 2007, aged 76.

== Selected filmography ==
Film
Year	Film	Notes
1969	The Racing Scene	Director
1970	MASH	Football choreographer (uncredited)
1973	Stacey	Director, producer, writer
1979	Seven	Director
1985	Malibu Express	Director, producer, writer
1987	Hard Ticket to Hawaii	Director, writer
1988	Picasso Trigger	Director, writer
1989	Savage Beach	Director, producer, writer
1990	Guns	Director, writer
1991	Do or Die	Director, writer
1992	Hard Hunted	Director, producer, writer
1993	Fit to Kill	Director, writer
1993	Enemy Gold	Producer
1994	The Dallas Connection	Executive producer
1996	Day of the Warrior	Director, writer
1998	L.E.T.H.A.L. Ladies: Return to Savage Beach	Director, writer
Television
Year	Title	Notes
1975	Kojak	Director, 1 episode
1976	Gemini Man	Director, 1 episode
1977	The Hardy Boys/Nancy Drew Mysteries	Director, 1 episode
