= Savage Beach =

- Promotional film poster
- Directed by: Andy Sidaris
- Written by: Andy Sidaris
- Starring: Dona Speir; Hope Marie Carlton; John Aprea; Bruce Penhall
- Cinematography: Howard Wexler
- Edited by: Michael Haight
- Music by: Gary Stockdale
- Distributed by: Malibu Bay Films
- Release date: October 1989 (USA)
- Running time: 92 minutes
- Country: United States
- Language: English

Savage Beach is a 1989 action adventure film written and directed by Andy Sidaris and starring Dona Speir, Hope Marie Carlton, John Aprea, Bruce Penhall. It is the fourth installment in the Triple B film series.

== Plot ==
Special Agent Donna Hamilton is tasked with delivering a much-needed vaccine to the Philippines as part of her cover job as a cargo pilot based out of Molokai. En route back to Hawaii, Donna and her protege, trainee Taryn, crash-land on a deserted Pacific island. While awaiting rescue, the women find themselves up against a group of mercenaries led by Captain Andres, who is trying to recover a fortune in gold lost during World War II.

== Cast ==
- Dona Speir as Donna
- Hope Marie Carlton as Taryn
- John Aprea as Captain Andreas
- Bruce Penhall as Bruce Christian
- Teri Weigel as Anjelica

== Release ==
Savage Beach was shown theatrically on October 13, 1989, in New York.

== Reception ==
From contemporary reviews, "Lor." of Variety declared the film to be an "entertaining action pic" stating that "Filmmaker Andy Sidaris ensures that most of the action is campy fun with his oddball dialog and predilection for having the female cast strip in the least likely situations." concluding that "Action fans who favor a tongue-in-cheek approach will enjoy this one."

== See also ==
- Girls with guns
