= Al Leong =

American actor, martial artist, stuntman, stunt co-ordinator

- Born: Albert Leong; September 30, 1952 (age 74); St. Louis, Missouri, U.S.
- Occupations: Actor, martial artist, stuntman, and stunt co-ordinator

Albert Leong (born September 30, 1952) is an American retired actor, martial artist, stuntman, and stunt co-ordinator. Often credited as "Asian Bad Guy", Leong was Hollywood's henchman of choice throughout the 1980s and 1990s. Characterised by his martial arts skills, long wavy hair, and a prominent Fu Manchu moustache, he has had a number of small but memorable roles in many popular action films, including Lethal Weapon (1987) with Mel Gibson and Danny Glover; Die Hard (1988) with Bruce Willis; Death Warrant (1990) with Jean-Claude Van Damme; and Rapid Fire (1992) with Brandon Lee. He is also notable for his role as Genghis Khan in Bill & Ted's Excellent Adventure (1989). He collaborated with director John Carpenter in Big Trouble in Little China (1986) and They Live (1988). Such appearances have garnered him a cult following.

In television, he appeared in series such as T. J. Hooker, The Fall Guy, Knight Rider, and 24, among others. Leong's martial art foundation is steeped within the 5 Animal Styles taught by Grandmaster Ark Yuey Wong in Chinatown, Los Angeles. In 2014, he was inducted into the Martial Arts History Museum Hall of Fame.

== Early life ==
Leong was born in St. Louis, Missouri. The youngest of three children born to Chinese American parents, he grew up behind the Chinese laundry that they owned. In 1962, when he was ten years old, they moved to Los Angeles. Leong attended Hollywood High School.

== Career ==
His credits include Lethal Weapon, Die Hard, Joshua Tree, Big Trouble in Little China, The Scorpion King, and They Live. and a recurring role on the first season of the TV series 24. He also portrayed an out-of-time Genghis Khan in the comedy Bill & Ted's Excellent Adventure. In 2003, Leong lampooned himself as well as the Hollywood tradition of actor and director 'reels' by starring in screenwriter David Callaham's "Writer's Reel." In the five-minute short film, Leong portrayed Callaham going through a typical day in the life of a writer. The 'reel' was accepted into a number of short film festivals.

As a stuntman, Leong was involved with the production of numerous films including The Golden Child, Last Action Hero, Roland Emmerich's Godzilla, Tim Burton's Planet of the Apes, and Daredevil. He also has made appearances on several television shows such as The A-Team, Knight Rider, Magnum, P.I., The Twilight Zone, T. J. Hooker, MacGyver, That '70s Show, and HBO's Deadwood. He wrote and directed the low-budget film Daddy Tell Me a Story....

== Personal life ==
=== Health ===
Leong had brain cancer in 1993 and suffered a stroke in 2005 and in October 2026.

== Filmography ==
=== Film ===
Al Leong film credits
Year	Title	Role	Notes
1983	Twilight Zone: The Movie	Vietnamese Villager	(Segment #1)
1983	Off the Wall	Mount Joy Cheerleader	
1984	Protocol	The Chef	
1985	My Science Project	Vietnamese Soldier	Uncredited
1986	Big Trouble	Chinese Laborer #2	
1986	Big Trouble in Little China	Wing Kong Hatchet Man	
1986	Running Scared	Henchman	Uncredited
1987	Lethal Weapon	Endo	
1988	She's Having a Baby	The Photographer	
1988	Action Jackson	Dellaplane’s Chauffeur	
1988	Die Hard	Uli	
1988	They Live	Resistance Member	Uncredited
1989	Bill & Ted's Excellent Adventure	Genghis Khan	
1989	Cage	Joe "Tiger Joe" Lowell	
1989	Black Rain	Sato's Assassin	Uncredited
1989	Savage Beach	Fu	
1990	I Come in Peace	Luggage Salesman	
1990	Aftershock	Fighter	Uncredited
1990	Death Warrant	Bruce	
1991	The Perfect Weapon	Man In Croc-Pit Bar	Also stunts, Uncredited
1991	Showdown in Little Tokyo	Thug	Also stunts, Uncredited
1992	Steel Justice	Guard #2	
1992	Rapid Fire	Minh	
1992	Hard Hunted	Raven	
1993	Joshua Tree	Chinese Gunman #9	
1993	Last Action Hero	Thug	Uncredited
1993	Hot Shots! Part Deux	Pit-Fighting Fan	Also stunts
1994	Beverly Hills Cop III	Car Mechanic	Also stunts, Uncredited
1994	The Shadow	Tibetan Driver	
1994	Double Dragon	Lewis	Also stunts
1994	Deadly Target	Guard	
1996	Escape from L.A.	Saigon Shadow Warrior	Also stunts
1997	Tuff Luk Klub	Cousin Ming	
1998	The Replacement Killers	Wei's Gunmen	Uncredited
1998	Godzilla	Japanese Fisherman	Also stunts, Uncredited
1998	Lethal Weapon 4	Wah Sing Ku Triad Member	Uncredited
1998	Limo	Hack	
2000	Daddy Tell Me a Story...	Al Ka Bong	
2001	The Ghost	Wu's Thug #2	
2002	The Scorpion King	Asian Training Master	
2005	Confessions of an Action Star	Evil Doctor	
2005	Forbidden Warrior	Yang Sze	
2014	Awesome Asian Bad Guys	Al	(2013)

=== Television ===
Al Leong television credits
Year	Title	Role	Notes	Date
1984	The A-Team	Thug At Boat	Episode: "The Maltese Falcon" (S2.E13)	1984-01-03
1985	The A-Team	Asian-Looking Thug	Episode: "Lease with an Option to Die" (S4.E4)	1985-10-22
1985–1986	The A-Team	(various)	3 episodes	
1983	The Greatest American Hero	Uncredited Extra	Episode: "Thirty Seconds Over Little Tokyo" (#39)	1983-02-03
1983	Hart to Hart	Tai-Chi Man	Episode: "Year of the Dog" (S5.E10)	1983-12-13
1984	Knight Rider	Fong's Bouncer (uncredited)	Episode: "Knight of the Drones" (S3.E1)	
1984	Magnum P.I.	Bodyguard #2	1 episode	
1984	The Fall Guy	Johnny	Episode: "Sandcastles" (S4.E8)	1984-11-07
1985	Airwolf	General Rangavara Bandit Soldier	1 episode	
1985	MacGyver	Wayne H. Lim	Episode: "Murderers' Sky" (S3.E20)	1988-05-09
1986	The Twilight Zone	Proprietor	Segment: "The Misfortune Cookie"	
1986	The Fall Guy	Quon	Episode: "Trial by Fire" (S5.E12)	1986-01-24
1986	Riptide	Mr. Yeem	Episode: "The Frankie Kahana Show" (S3.E13)	1986-02-11
1986	Renegade	The Yakuza Boss	Episode: "Samurai" (S1.E14)	
1986	T. J. Hooker	Nabutsu Hood #1 (uncredited)	Episode: "Blood Sport" (S5.E88)	1986-05-21
1986	The Equalizer	"Joe Boy" Chinese gangster (uncredited)	Episode: "China Rain" (S1.E2)	1985-09-25
1987	Steele Justice	Long Hair	TV movie	
1994	Kung Fu: The Legend Continues	Unknown / Stunt Coordinator	Episode: "The Warlord"	
1994	Vanishing Son III	Triad Lieutenant #1	TV movie	
2000	That '70s Show	Kung-Fu Master / Ninja Warrior	Episode: "Jackie Moves On" (S2.E22)	2000-04-03
2002	24	Neill	4 episodes (season 1)	

=== Music videos ===
- 2003 "Poppin' Them Thangs" by G-Unit
