= Hard Hunted =

- VHS cover art
- Directed by: Andy Sidaris
- Written by: Andy Sidaris
- Produced by: Arlene Sidaris
- Starring: Dona Speir; Roberta Vasquez; Cynthia Brimhall; Bruce Penhall; R.J. Moore
- Cinematography: John A. Morrill; Mark Morris
- Edited by: Craig Stewart
- Music by: Richard Lyons
- Distributed by: Malibu Bay Films
- Release date: June 1992
- Running time: 97 minutes
- Country: United States
- Language: English

Hard Hunted is a 1992 action/adventure film starring Dona Speir, Roberta Vasquez, Cynthia Brimhall, Bruce Penhall and Geoffrey Moore. It was directed and written by Andy Sidaris. It's the seventh installment in the Triple B film series.

== Outline ==
Martin Kane smuggles a nuclear trigger out of China and agrees to sell it to a terrorist in the Middle East. The US Intelligence Services send a special undercover agent to steal the device from Kane, but she fails and is found murdered. A team of three further agents, Donna Hamilton, Nicole Justin, and Edy Stark, is then sent in to try to retrieve the situation, fighting a gang of hi-tech smugglers with a deadly array of weaponry and erotic charms.

== Cast ==
- Dona Speir as Donna Hamilton
- Roberta Vasquez as Nicole Justin
- Bruce Penhall as Bruce Christian
- Geoffrey Moore as Kane (credited as R.J. Moore)
- Tony Peck as Lucas
- Cynthia Brimhall as Edy Stark
- Al Leong as Raven
- Rodrigo Obregón as Pico
- Michael J. Shane as Shane Abilene
- Ava Cadell as Ava
- Skip Ward as Skip
- Chu Chu Malave as Wiley
- Richard Cansino as "Coyote"
- Carolyn Liu as "Silk"
- Buzzy Kerbox as Cole
- Mika Quintard as Mika
- Brett Baxter Clark as Yacht Captain
- Paul Cody as Kidnapper
- Becky Mullen as Becky
- Joe Gianpietro as Paratrooper
- Aaron Victorbrook as Senator
- David Friend as Navy Captain
- Steven Matt as Army General
- Karen Klosterman as Air Force General
- Viviane Brahms as Senator's Assistant
- Bern Mueller as Vulture Pilot
- Richard Bentley as "Six"
- Eric Brahms as Smuggler One
- Robert Carillo as Smuggler Two
- Sebastian Fent as Radio Station Worker
- David Hadder as Yacht Crewman
- Leland McKinney as Yacht Crewman
- Christian Drew Sidaris as Deputy (credited as Christian Sidaris)
- Rodd Saunders as Deputy
- Wess Shannon Rahn as Deputy
- Brian Bennos as Deputy
- Ken Feinberg as Pentagon Guard (credited as Kenneth Feinberg)
- Willa Dean Crow as Edy's Quartet
- Echo Yamashita as Edy's Quartet
- Blake Yamashita as Edy's Quartet
- Tony Guzman as Edy's Quartet

== Reception ==
The film is said to have been inspired by You Only Live Twice. It is also considered a modern depiction of the archetype of the Amazons.

== See also ==
- Girls with guns
