= Enemy Gold =

- Film Poster
- Directed by: Christian Drew Sidaris
- Written by: Wess Rahn; Christian Drew Sidaris
- Produced by: Brian Bennos; Wess Rahn
- Starring: Bruce Penhall; Mark Barriere; Rodrigo Obergon; Suzi Simpson; Tanquil Lisa Collins; Julie Strain
- Cinematography: Mark Morris
- Edited by: Craig Stewart
- Music by: Ron Di Iulio
- Production companies: Malibu Bay Films; Skyhawks Films; MBP (Germany); Starlight Film; H.R.S. Funai Co. Ltd.
- Distributed by: Prism Entertainment; Malibu Bay Films
- Release date: December 1993 (Germany)
- Running time: 92 minute
- Country: United States
- Language: English

Enemy Gold is a 1993 action adventure film starring Bruce Penhall, Mark Barriere, and Suzi Simpson. It was directed by Christian Drew Sidaris (Andy Sidaris's son, sometimes referred to simply as Drew Sidaris) and written by Wess Rahn and Sidaris. It is the ninth film in the Triple B film series.

== Plot ==
In 1864, the Battle of Pleasant Hill rages. General Quantrill of the Confederate army orders twelve of his men to break off behind enemy lines to disrupt the Union supply lines and seize a shipment of gold. Only two soldiers survive and manage to escape with the gold. They ride off into the woods where one is seen holding a gunshot wound to the gut while the other buries the gold bars, sticks a knife into a tree, and then begins writing in his journal.

In 1993, federal agents Chris Cannon and Mark Austin are preparing to go on a drug raid when they are interrupted by fellow agent Becky Midnite. Cannon had requested backup from HQ in Washington but was not aware who would be sent or when. The three agents go to a farm with Midnite entering from the front to distract the guards, claiming to be lost. Meanwhile, Cannon and Austin sneak into a barn where they find crates of hollowed out watermelons containing cocaine bundles. Cannon confronts one of the dealers and a gun fight ensues. Two of the dealers try to escape to a watermelon hauling pickup truck when Midnite fires an explosive crossbow arrow at it causing an explosion that knocks them to the ground where they are arrested by Cannon and Austin. Just then, division head Chief Dickson shows up and chews them out for not following agency regulations and conducting operations without a warrant. He tells them he's going to open an investigation into their conduct.

Later, head drug dealer Santiago is seen conducting business from his strip club. Dickson walks in and tells Santiago he was unaware of the drug bust until it was over. Santiago tells him the raid caused Santiago to lose $20M street value in cocaine. It is revealed that Santiago and Dickson have a relationship where Santiago will provide Dickson with intel on Santiago's criminal competitors and Dickson will use that knowledge to conduct raids that have earned him promotions to division Chief. Dickson then uses his position to shield Santiago from any agency action. Santiago calls for the deaths of Cannon, Austin and Midnite but Dickson tells him all he's going to get for now is a radio that will allow him to eavesdrop on the agents' communications.

Agent Ava Noble goes to HQ in Washington to argue on the team's behalf. She is unsuccessful and told the team is being suspended. Noble tells the team they should go camping while she continues to appeal their suspension.

The agents go out to dinner and Cannon and Austin convince Midnite to go camping with them. Cannon and Austin discuss camping as children and always hoping to find Quantrill's Gold but being convinced it was just a legend.

Back at Santiago's club, he receives several visitors ranging from business partners he owes money to the henchmen at the farm who failed to protect his cocaine watermelons. An old friend, Jewel Panther, arrives. Santiago tells her about the agents disrupting his business and tells her they should kill them together. Meanwhile, Cannon calls Noble and tells her the team is headed to the forest. Santiago and Panther are listening in and formulate a plan to intercept them.

During a camping break in the forest, Midnite leaves the group to relieve herself in the woods. There, she stumbles upon a string and follows it back to skeletal remains found under a log. Cannon and Austin run towards her screams and inspect the remains. There, they find a diary containing a hand drawn map. Based on the last dated entry, Cannon deduces that the map will lead them to General Quantrill's Gold. He calls in this new information to Noble while an eavesdropping Santiago and Panther steal a park ranger's boat to pursue them.

The agents stop for the night at a cabin. Reading the diary further, they learn that the diary's author marked a tree with a knife where the gold is buried. The following morning, Santiago's henchmen attack the cabin. One of them steals an ATV and rides off into the woods while Cannon and Austin pursue him on dirt bikes. The henchman is killed in the chase when he is clotheslined by a tree. Cannon notices a knife wedged into the tree.

Back at the cabin, a second henchman is trying to kill Midnite when she gains the upper hand and shoots him in the chest with an explosive crossbow arrow. Cannon and Austin quickly return to the cabin following the explosion.

Agent Noble meets with Dickson to question him about the internal investigation. Just then, she receives a call from Cannon informing her that the agents just ran into henchmen they encountered at the previous drug raid. Noble cuts her meeting short to join the rest of the team in the forest. Dickson insists on joining her, claiming that all the agents are his responsibility.

Cannon, Austin and Midnite head back to the tree and start digging. They discover the gold just as Santiago and Panther show up and force them to carry the gold out of the woods at gunpoint. Noble and Dickson arrive to rescue the team, but as Noble has Santiago and Panther held at gunpoint, Dickson reveals his betrayal and turns his gun on Noble. Deciding they don't need Dickson anymore, Panther shoots him in the stomach. Amidst the chaos, the agents grab the gold and run while Santiago and Panther attempt to escape in a waiting helicopter. Noble stops them by firing an explosive crossbow arrow at the helicopter.

The agents bring the gold back to the agency and are told it will probably wind up in a Civil War museum. While celebrating in a hot tub over champagne, Noble announces a new Chief has been chosen to take over the division: the team will be reporting to her from now on.

== Cast ==
- Bruce Penhall as Chris Cannon
- Mark Barriere as Mark Austin
- Suzi Simpson as Becky Midnite
- Tanquil Lisa Collins as Ava Noble (credited as Tai Collins)
- Rodrigo Obergon as Santiago
- Julie Strain as Jewel Panther
- Kym Malin as Cowboy's Hostess

== Production ==
A review in the Chicago Tribune recalled that "Like all Sidaris films, "Enemy Gold" is a family affair. Andy is executive producer (such a rental draw is he that "Enemy Gold's" distributor bills it as "An Andy Sidaris Produced Film"), along with wife Arlene. The script was co-written by Christian, Drew's younger brother. Producer Brian Bennos, Drew's partner in the newly formed Skyhawk Films, is a first cousin who got his start building the sets that Andy blew up in his films."

== See also ==
- Girls with guns
