= Peter Knecht =

American lawyer

Peter Leo Knecht (September 19, 1936 – October 3, 2014) was a criminal defense attorney from Los Angeles, California. During his career, he represented many Hollywood and music-biz celebrities, including sentenced rockstar David Crosby.

== Career ==
Knecht worked on the defense side of the law, primarily through his affiliation with the law practice of Harry Weiss. Knecht appeared as a television analyst and consultant on criminal justice for major broadcast news outlets, including CBS, NBC, ABC, FOX, CNN, and local networks such as KCAL-TV Channel 9 and KCOP-TV Channel 13. He also appeared on 'Celebrity Justice”. His major cases have been featured on morning talk shows like The NBC Today Show and ABC “Good Morning America”.

== Personal life ==
Knecht was born in 1936 modern-day Austria, Vienna. His family fled to the US when World War II broke out, where he attended law school. He was married to Ava Cadell from 1992 until his death. He had a son and a daughter, Chance and Courtney, in addition to a grandson and granddaughter. He died on October 3, 2014, at his home in California from cancer.

== Filmography ==
Year	Title	Role	Notes
1979	Seven	Kimo Maderos	
1985	Malibu Express	Peter	(final film role)
2020	Jay Sebring....Cutting to the Truth	Himself	
