= Ava Cadell =

Hungarian and American sexologist and actress

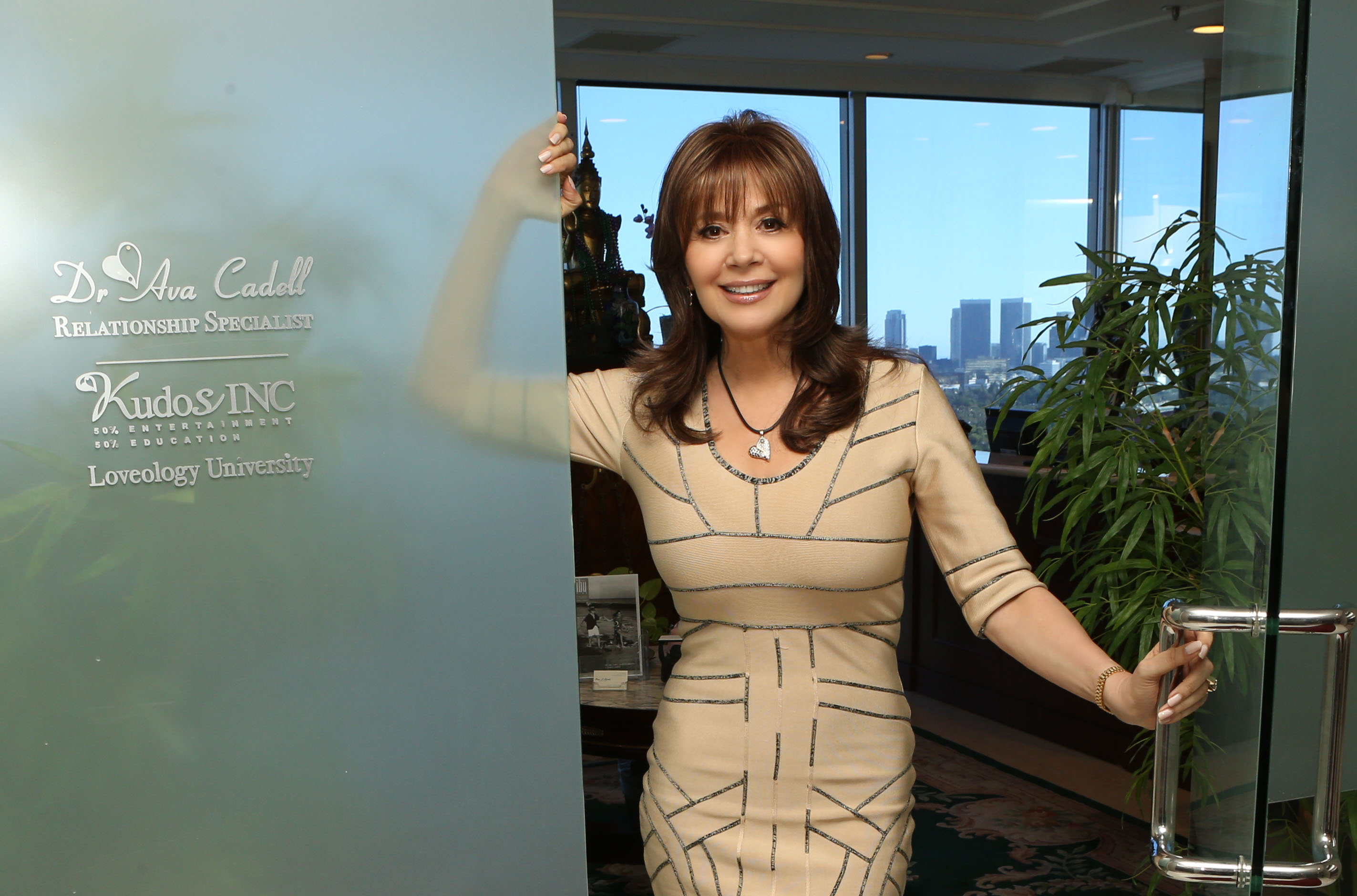
- Cadell in 2013
- Born: Éva Csáth Ildikó; 1956 (age 69–70)
- Occupations: Sexologist; writer; therapist; actress
- Years active: 1974–present
- Spouse: Peter Knecht (m. 1992; died 2014)
- Website: Official website

Ava Cadell (born Éva Csáth Ildikó, 1956) is a Hungarian and American sexologist, writer and therapist on issues of sexuality, and former actress.

== Early life ==
Born in Budapest, Hungary in 1956, Cadell appeared in British and American TV and films from the 1970s to the 1990s.

== Career ==
An early role was as a model on the BBC sitcom Steptoe and Son, in the episode "Back in Fashion" (1974). American roles included episodes of Dallas and The Love Boat.

She later moved to California and embarked on an academic career, receiving a doctorate in human behavior from Newport University and a doctorate of education in human sexuality from the Institute for Advanced Study of Human Sexuality, San Francisco. She then began writing and lecturing, based out of Los Angeles.

Cadell runs a private practice in Los Angeles which counsels individuals and couples on personal issues. In 2003, she was featured on an episode of A&E's Take This Job, entitled "The Love Connection".

== Personal life ==
In 1979 Cadell married restaurateur Andrew Martyn-Smith. The couple moved from England to Miami, and then to Los Angeles. She was later married to criminal defense attorney Peter Knecht from 1992 until his death in 2014.

== Selected filmography ==
Year	Title	Role
1998	L.E.T.H.A.L. Ladies: Return to Savage Beach	Ava
1993	Fit to Kill	Ava
1993	Amore!	Mrs. Scarborough
1992	Hard Hunted	Ava
1991	Do or Die	Ava
1988	Not of This Earth	Second Hooker
1985	Into the Night	Club hostess
1985	Commando	Girl in bed at motel
1984	Jungle Warriors	Didi Belair
1983	Smokey and the Bandit Part 3	The Blonde
1981	History of the World, Part I	French girl
1979	Outer Touch	Partha
1979	The Golden Lady	Anita
1978	The Hound of the Baskervilles	Marsha
1975	The Ups and Downs of a Handyman	Schoolgirl
1974	Confessions of a Window Cleaner	Naked college girl

== Selected published works ==
=== Books ===
- 1993: Hot Spots. Hot Spots Publishing.
- 1997: Between the Sheets. A.C. Entertainment. ISBN 978-0966262346
- 1998: Love Around the House. A.C. Publishing. ISBN 978-0966262308
- 1999: Confessions to a Sexologist. Los Angeles: Peters Publishing. ISBN 978-0966262322
- 1999: The Stock Market Orgasm. Peters Publishing. ISBN 978-0966262315
- 2002: 12 Steps to Everlasting Love. Peters Publishing. ISBN 978-0966262339
- 2004: The Pocket Idiot's Guide to Oral Sex. Indianapolis: Alpha Books. ISBN 978-1592572939
- 2005: Dr. Ava's Tantra Workbook. Kudos Inc. ISBN 978-0966262384
- 2011: The Sexy Little Book of Oral Pleasure. Indianapolis: Alpha Books. ISBN 978-1615641345
- 2012: The Sexy Little Book of Sex Games. Indianapolis: Alpha Books. ISBN 978-1101556245
- 2014: Neuroloveology: The Power to Mindful Love & Sex. New York: Open Road Integrated Media. ISBN 978-1624672255
- 2015: Idiot's Guides: Kama Sutra. London: DK Publishing. ISBN 978-1615647163

=== Audio ===
- 1995: Soundz of Sex, music album, ASIN B000008QSL
- 1997: Between the Sheets, audiobook, ISBN 0966262344
- 2003: DOC Johnson Presents: Ava's Hot Lips, audiobook, ASIN B000ZUBY0A

=== Journal articles ===
- Cadell, Ava (2010-01-01). "The Loveologist Guide to Cheating: Secrets to Why People Cheat and How to Prevent Cheating". Electronic Journal of Human Sexuality. 13.
