= Day of the Warrior =

- VHS cover art
- Directed by: Andy Sidaris
- Written by: Andy Sidaris
- Produced by: Arlene Sidaris; Christian Drew Sidaris (executive producer)
- Starring: Kevin Light; Cristian Letelier
- Cinematography: Mark Morris
- Edited by: Anthony Dalesandro
- Music by: Ron Di Lulio
- Distributed by: Skyhawks Films Inc.
- Release date: 1996
- Running time: 96 minutes
- Country: United States
- Language: English

Day of the Warrior (also known as L.E.T.H.A.L. Ladies: Day of the Warrior) is a 1996 action adventure film written and directed by Andy Sidaris and starring Kevin Light and Julie Strain. It is the eleventh and penultimate installment in Andy Sidaris' Triple B film series.

== Plot ==
A team of female agents must stop the scheme of the Warrior, a former CIA agent turned criminal freelancer, who stole the agency's computer database and is now going after undercover agents one by one.

== Cast ==
- Kevin Light as "Doc" Austin
- Cristian Letelier as J. Tyler Ward
- Julie Strain as Willow Black
- Julie K. Smith as "Cobra"
- Shae Marks as "Tiger"
- Marcus Bagwell as "Warrior"
- Raye Hollitt as Kym
- Rodrigo Obregón as Manuel
- Justin Melvey as Jordon
- Gerald Okamura as Fu
- Richard Cansino as J.P.
- Cassidy Phillips as Chaz
- Tammy Parks as "Scorpion"
- Darren Wise as "Shark"
- Ted Prior as Dietrich
- Kevin Eastman as Harry "The Cat"

== Release ==
Day of the Warrior was broadcast on Cinemax. It was released on Blu-Ray in 2020.

== Reception ==
A retrospective review by Charleston Picou from Horror News Net in 2020 states that "Day of the Warrior is an exploitative movie that's pretty blatant about what its intentions are. However, it still manages to have its own charm in not only in embracing the ridiculous, but also how openly un-PC it is. It's the kind of film that could have only been made in the halcyon days of the 1990s. Check it out."

The film gained a retrospective cult following.

== See also ==
- List of American films of 1996
- Girls with guns
