= Joan Bennett (disambiguation) =

Joan Bennett (1910–1990) was an American stage, film, and television actress.

Joan Bennett may also refer to:

- Joan Bennett (model) (born 1964), American model
- Joan W. Bennett (born 1942), American geneticist
- Joan Bennett (literary scholar) (1896–1986), also known as Joan Frankau, British literary scholar and critic

== See also ==
- Joan Bennett Kennedy (Virginia Joan Kennedy, née Bennett, 1936–2025), American socialite, musician, author, and model
- Death of JonBenét Ramsey
