= Seven (1979 film) =

1979 film by Andy Sidaris

- Theatrical release poster
- Directed by: Andy Sidaris
- Screenplay by: William Driskill; Robert Baird
- Story by: Andy Sidaris
- Produced by: Andy Sidaris
- Starring: William Smith; Barbara Leigh; Art Metrano; Martin Kove; Susan Kiger
- Edited by: Alan E. Ferguson
- Production company: Melvin Simon Productions
- Distributed by: American International Pictures (US)
- Release date: September 21, 1979 (Los Angeles)
- Running time: 101 minutes
- Country: United States
- Language: English

Seven is a 1979 American action film directed by Andy Sidaris and starring William Smith as Drew Sevano, a freelance agent hired by the government to eliminate a cartel of seven mobsters attempting to take over Hawaii. To help him accomplish this, Drew recruits a team of seven individual operatives with their own special talents.

== Plot ==
In sun-drenched Hawaii, a dynamic criminal organisation run by seven ruthless professional kingpins intends to liquidate its political leaders, and when they fulfil their plans, take over the 50th State and pillage the land. Although this may be true, the government will soon retaliate by summoning the unconventional special agent Drew Sevano, who, in turn, assembles an invincible and well-equipped army of six other deadly agents; all assigned will their target of choice. But things are looking bleak and the mandatory half-hour time frame for the completion of the operation is already tight. Will Sevano's Seven succeed?

== Cast ==
- William Smith as Drew
- Barbara Leigh as Alexa
- Guich Koock as The Cowboy
- Christipher Joy as T. K.
- Art Metrano as Kinsella
- Ed Parker as himself
- Richard LePore as The Professor
- Reggie Nalder as The Hermit
- Seth Sakai as Keoki McDowell
- Kwan Hi Lim as Mr. Chen
- Tino Tuiolosega as Mr. Lee
- Lenny Montana as The Kahuna
- Martin Kove as Skip
- Susan Kiger as Jennie
- Peter Knecht as Kimo Maderos
- Terry Kiser as Senator
- Nicholas Georgiade as Niko
- Tadashi Yamashita as Swordsman
- Andy Sidaris as White Hat Man

== Production ==
Seven was filmed at Oahu and Kauai in Hawaii. Robert Baird, who is credited along with William Driskill as screenwriter, is a pseudonym for writer and photographer William Edgar. The Hollywood Reporter budgeted the film at $2 million and noted that the film had "just completed" in their February 7, 1979 article.

== Release ==
Seven was released in the United States on September 21, 1979, where it premiered in Los Angeles. The film distributed by American International.

== Reception ==
Variety stated that Seven is "filled with stock Hawaiian footage, and not very good stuff at that. Pic lags continually, which won't pacify the action audience." The review also noted that "product plugs are also heavy-handed, and enumerated again with a final credit." The Monthly Film Bulletin stated that the film was "rendered thoroughly mechanical by the laborious business of pairing off its seven hit men with their seven underworld targets. The film's trite efforts to make an impression with its bizarre methods of execution-by hang-glider, lasergun and inflatable sex doll-do little to offset the interminable exposition."
