= Cynthia Brimhall =

American model and B-movie actress

Playboy centerfold appearance
- October 1985
- Preceded by: Venice Kong
- Succeeded by: Pamela Saunders

Personal details
- Born: March 10, 1964 (age 62) Ogden, Utah, U.S.
- Height: 5 ft 9.5 in (1.77 m)

Cynthia Brimhall (born March 10, 1964, in Ogden, Utah) is an American model and B-movie actress. She was Playboy's Playmate of the Month for October 1985.

== Career ==
Brimhall went on to perform in six films by Andy Sidaris as nightclub singer and secret agent Edy Stark and appeared on The Price Is Right as one of Barker's Beauties. Brimhall starred in "Skintight" at Harrah's in Las Vegas from August 2000 to September 2001. She worked with Gene Simmons in KISS: eXposed (1987) and starred with Dwight Yoakam in the "I'd Kill to Direct" episode of the CBS TV series P.S. I Love U.

== Filmography ==
=== Actress ===
- High Roller: The Stu Ungar Story (2003)
- Fit to Kill (1993)
- Every Breath (1993)
- Hard Hunted (1992)
- Do or Die (1991)
- Guns (1990)
- Picasso Trigger (1988)
- Hard Ticket to Hawaii (1987)

=== Herself ===
- Playboy Playmate DVD Calendar Collection: The '90s (2004)
- Playboy: Red Hot Redheads (2001)
- Playboy: Playmates Revisited (1998)
- The Price Is Right (1993–94)
- Playboy: Playmates at Play (1990)
- Playboy: Sexy Lingerie (1988)
- Playboy Video Playmate Calendar 1987 (1986)

== See also ==
- List of people in Playboy 1980–1989

== Notes ==
| Joan Bennett | Cherie Witter | Donna Smith | Cindy Brooks | Kathy Shower | Devin DeVasquez |
| Hope Marie Carlton | Cher Butler | Venice Kong | Cynthia Brimhall | Pamela Saunders | Carol Ficatier |
