= Shae Marks =

American model and actress (born 1972)

Playboy centerfold appearance
- May 1994
- Preceded by: Becky DelosSantos
- Succeeded by: Elan Carter

Personal details
- Born: June 1, 1972 (age 54) New Orleans, Louisiana, USA
- Height: 5 ft 4 in (1.63 m)

Shae Marks (born June 1, 1972) is an American model and actress. She is the Playboy Playmate of the Month for May 1994.

== Career ==
Shae Marks was discovered by a Playboy photographer when she was 20 years old when she was asked to pose for an advertisement for World Gym in Houston, Texas. One month later, in October 1993, she flew to Los Angeles, California (meeting her future husband on the flight), did a test shoot for a centerfold and was accepted as Playmate of the Month for May 1994. During her stint with Playboy, Marks was a traveling representative for the company, visiting such ports of call as Hong Kong and Denmark. After her Playmate appearance, Marks went on to appear in several Playboy Special Editions including Book of Lingerie, Girls of Summer, and Voluptuous Vixens.

Later she entered the acting arena, appearing on television shows such as Married... with Children, Renegade, Viper, and Baywatch. Marks was also featured in advertisements for Molson Beer, as well as modeling for Frederick's of Hollywood, Venus Swimwear, and other catalogs.

Marks had a thirteen episode role on the television super hero action series Black Scorpion as the character of Babette. She has also had roles in movies such as Day of the Warrior (1996), L.E.T.H.A.L. Ladies: Return to Savage Beach (1998), and the French Stewart comedy Love Stinks.

Marks made an appearance on the live January 22, 1996, episode of WWF Monday Night Raw as Hunter Hearst Helmsley's valet during his match against Razor Ramon.

== Personal life ==
Marks was born in New Orleans, Louisiana, where she spent most of childhood. According to her Playmate Profile, she was a tomboy growing up. Soon after her tenth birthday, Marks's family moved to Peachtree City, Georgia, a suburb of Atlanta. While in high school she played soccer and tennis and was involved in swimming and cheerleading. After graduating from McIntosh High School, she briefly majored in journalism at the University of West Georgia, but later dropped out and moved back to New Orleans.

Marks was married in 1998.

== Filmography ==
- Cover Me (1995), Candy Jefferson
- Scoring (1995), Phyllis
- Day of the Warrior (1996), Tiger
- Blue Heat: The Case of the Cover Girl Murders (1997), Candy
- Playboy Real Couples Sex in Dangerous Places (1995), Herself
- Playboy Voluptuous Vixens (1997), Herself
- Playboy Gen-X Girls (1998), Herself
- Playboy Blondes, Brunettes, Redheads (1991), Herself
- L.E.T.H.A.L. Ladies: Return to Savage Beach (1998), Tiger
- Love Stinks (1999), Jasmine
- Sting of the Black Scorpion (2001), Babette

== Selected TV appearances ==
- Baywatch, Girl in Logan's Tower - in the episode "Sweet Dreams" (1995)
- High Tide - in the episode "Thank Heaven for Little Girls" (1995)
- Married... with Children, Colleen - in the episode "Pump Fiction" (1995)
- Married... with Children, Inga - in the episode "The Two That Got Away" (1995)
- WWF Monday Night Raw - ring escort of Hunter Hearst Helmsley (1996)
- Silk Stalkings, Marla Hess - in the episode "Playing Doctor" (1996)
- Viper, Connie Matuszak - in the episode "First Mob Wives Club" (1997)
- Renegade, Michelle - in the episode "Sex, Lies and Activewear" (1997)

Anna-Marie Goddard	Julie Lynn Cialini	Neriah Davis	Becky DelosSantos	Shae Marks	Elan Carter
Traci Adell	Maria Checa	Kelly Gallagher	Victoria Zdrok	Donna Perry	Elisa Bridges
