= Sex Court =

- Playboy Sex Court VHS cover with Julie Strain and Alexandra Silk on the cover.
- Starring: Julie Strain
- Country of origin: United States

Production
- Running time: 30 minutes

Original release
- Network: Playboy TV
- Release: June 11, 1998 – 2001

Sex Court is a US adult-themed cable TV show that was produced by 'Playboy Magazine Productions that made its debut on Playboy TV in 1998. It starred Julie Strain, Alexandra Silk, an unknown man who played the Sex Court 'Bodyguard', Henry, and of course the people who wanted cases 'tried'. Usually, people would submit complaints like 'My wife's had an affair'. The cases would be 'tried' in front of 'Judge' Julie Strain, and sentences ranged from a man pouring hot, melted candlewax on his unfaithful voluptuous wife's breasts, a sexually repressed woman having sex with a male audience member and another female 'defendant' being 'ravaged' by the Sex Court 'bodyguard' Henry.

Sex Court: The Movie is a softcore erotica movie from 2001 based on Sex Court.

Playboy filed a lawsuit against a website that was using the same name. The website's owner filed a countersuit claiming that he was using the name first and that he should get a percentage of the $8.9 million dollars the show had made. Playboy and the site later settled their differences with Playboy paying out an undisclosed amount in exchange for the website ceasing the use of the name "Sex Court".

== Main Cast ==
- Julie Strain as Herself (59 episodes)
- Alexandra Silk as The Bailiff (58 episodes)
- Asher Pryce as Private Dick (37 episodes)
- Nikita Gross as The Stenographer (37 episodes)
- Stephanie Swinney as Female Bodyguard / Tara Wellsly (37 episodes)
- Brittany Andrews as The Sex Expert (34 episodes)
- Aaron Brumfield as Male Bodyguard (credited as Onyx) (29 episodes)
- John McCaffery as Private Dick (21 episodes)
- Linda O'Neil as Female Bodyguard
- Anthony Stone as Male Bodyguard (14 episodes)
- Devinn Lane as The Sex Expert (10 episodes)
- Ava Vincent as The Stenographer / Stephanie Fixk (9 episodes)
- Erroll Sean Warfield as Male Bodyguard (7 episodes)
- Emery Guillory as Male Bodyguard (7 episodes)
- Skye Ashton as The Stenographer (6 episodes)
- Taylor Hayes as The Sex Expert (5 episodes)
