= The Dallas Connection =

1994 American film

- Directed by: Christian Drew Sidaris
- Written by: Christian Drew Sidaris
- Produced by: Andy Sidaris; Arlene Sidaris; Wess Rahn; Brian Bennos
- Starring: Bruce Penhall; Mark Barriere; Julie Strain; Rodrigo Obregon; Samantha Phillips
- Cinematography: Mark Morris
- Edited by: Craig Stewart
- Music by: Ron Di Lulio
- Distributed by: Starlight
- Release dates: September 2, 1994 (Japan); October 10, 1994 (U.S. video)
- Running time: 94 minutes
- Country: United States
- Language: English

The Dallas Connection is a 1994 spy action film starring Bruce Penhall, Mark Barriere and Julie Strain. It was written and directed by Christian Drew Sidaris and is the tenth installment in the Triple B film series produced by Andy Sidaris, his father.

== Cast ==
- Bruce Penhall as Chris Cannon
- Mark Barriere as Mark Austin
- Julie Strain as "Black Widow"
- Rodrigo Obregon as Antonio Morales
- Samantha Phillips as Samantha Maxx (credited as Sam Phillips)
- Kym Malin as Cowboy's Hostess
- Julie K. Smith as "Cobra"

== Triple B Series ==
This film is considered to be the tenth installment in the Andy Sidaris Triple B Series of films.

== See also ==
- Girls with guns
