= Steve Bond =

American actor

- Born: Shlomo Goldberg; April 22, 1953 (age 73); Haifa, Israel
- Spouse: Cindy Bond
- Children: 2, including Ashlee

Steve Bond (born Shlomo Goldberg, Hebrew: שלמה גולדברג, on April 22, 1953) is an Israeli-American television actor and model.

== Early life ==
Shlomo Goldberg (later Steve Bond) was born in Haifa, Israel, to a Romania-born mother and a Hungary-born father who immigrated to Israel.

== Career ==
Bond made his film debut with a starring role in Tarzan and the Jungle Boy, shot in 1965 but not released until 1968. In 1975, he appeared full-frontal nude for a photo-spread published in the October issue of Playgirl magazine. He moved to the U.S. in the early 1980s. He became a daytime television actor on General Hospital, playing Jimmy Lee Holt from 1983 to 1987. In 1984, Bond posed bare-chested for a pin-up wall poster. In the early 1980s, he worked as a male stripper for Chippendales and appeared in one of the calendars. As a Chippendale dancer, he appeared on the 1982 show The Shape of Things.

His early film credits included roles in Massacre at Central High (1976), H.O.T.S. (1979), Gas Pump Girls (1979), Witches' Brew (1980) and The Prey (1983).

1988 marked the year of Bond's breakthrough leading role as Travis Abilene in Picasso Trigger.

In 1989, he joined the cast of daytime drama Santa Barbara as Mack Blake where he stayed for one year. Later, he starred as a seductive, evil vampire in the movies To Die For (1989) and Son of Darkness: To Die For II (1991).

== Personal life ==
In 1982 he married his wife Cindy; they have a daughter, Ashlee Bond, who is now an American-Israeli Olympic show jumping rider who competes for Israel.

== Filmography ==
=== Film ===
| Year | Title | Role | Notes |
|---|---|---|---|
| 1968 | Tarzan and the Jungle Boy | Erik Brunik | Feature film |
| 1969 | The Arrangement | Eddie (uncredited role) | Feature film |
| 1976 | Cat Murkil and the Silks | Joey Murkil | Feature film |
| 1976 | Massacre at Central High | Craig | Feature film |
| 1979 | H.O.T.S. | John | Feature film |
| 1979 | Gas Pump Girls | Butch | Feature film |
| 1980 | Witches' Brew | Mike | Feature film |
| 1982 | Star Trek II: The Wrath of Khan | Khan's Crewman #1 (uncredited role) | Feature film |
| 1983 | The Prey | Joel | Feature film |
| 1985 | The Wait of the World | Unknown role | Direct-to-video film |
| 1988 | Picasso Trigger | Travis Abilene | Feature film |
| 1988 | Magdalene | Father Joseph Mohr | Feature film |
| 1988 | To Die For | Tom | Feature film |
| 1991 | Son of Darkness: To Die For II | Tom | Feature film |
| 1992 | Foxy Lady | Mark Derrick | Feature film |
| 1994 | Tryst | Parkinson | Feature film |
| 1996 | Blue Devil, Blue Devil | Unknown role | Feature film |
| 1999 | My Favorite Martian | The SETI Group Driver | Feature film |
| 1999 | The Joyriders | Highway patrolman | Feature film |
| 2012 | Noah | Punda (voice only) | Feature film a/k/a Noah's Ark: The New Beginning (in the U.S.) this film was never completed due to lack of funding |
| 2014 | Born to Race: Fast Track | Richard Duncannon | Direct-to-video film |

=== Television ===
| Year | Title | Role | Notes |
|---|---|---|---|
| 1974 | McCloud | Don | Episode: "The 42nd Street Cavalry" |
| 1979 | Bigfoot and Wildboy | Hollister | Episode: "The Birth of a Titan" |
| 1980 | The Incredible Hulk | Young Man | Episode: "Prometheus: Part II" |
| 1981 | Miracle on Ice | Reporter #2 | Television movie (ABC) |
| 1983-1986 | General Hospital | Jimmy Lee Holt | Daytime serial (contract role @ 212 episodes) |
| 1987 | Matlock | Brett Cassidy | Episode: "The Therapist" |
| 1987 | You Are the Jury | James Finnigan | Episode: "The State of Oregon vs. Stanley Manning" |
| 1989 | Full House | Todd Masters | Episode: "Luck Be a Lady: Part 1" |
| 1989-1990 | Santa Barbara | Mac Blake | Daytime serial (recurring role @ 123 episodes) |
| 1990 | The Love Boat: A Valentine Voyage | Kirk Powers | Television movie (ABC) This was the last of 5 special movies which aired from November 1986 to February 1990 after the showed ended its original run on May 24, 1986 |
| 1993 | Silk Stalkings | Dick Plasmeyer | Episode: "Soul Kiss" |
| 1996 | High Incident | unknown role | Episode: "52 Car Pick-Up" |
| 1997 | Spacejacked | Taylor | Television movie (Showtime/The Movie Channel) |
| 2001 | Epoch | Colonel Tell | Television movie (Sci Fi Channel) |
| 2017 | Enchanted Christmas | Oliver | Television movie (The Hallmark Channel) |
