= Gerald Okamura =

American actor and martial artist

- Born: 1940 (age 85–86); Hilo, Hawaii
- Occupations: Actor; martial artist; stuntman
- Martial arts career
- Style: San Soo
- Trainer: Jimmy H. Woo
- Rank: 5th degree black belt in San Soo
- Website: geraldokamura.com

Gerald Okamura (born 1940) is an American actor, martial artist, and stuntman, known for appearing in numerous action films. He has acted in both mainstream blockbusters like Big Trouble in Little China (1986) and B-movies such as Samurai Cop (1991).

== Early life ==
Okamura was born in Hilo, Hawaii in 1940. He began studying judo at the age of 13. He enlisted in the United States Army after graduating high school, where he was deployed to South Korea and was introduced to taekwondo. After his discharge, he moved to Los Angeles, where he enrolled in Jimmy H. Woo's San Soo school, eventually earning a 5th-degree black belt.

Okamura has also trained in kendo and aikido, and is a designer of various types of weaponry.

== Career ==
Okamura began doing stunts in 1975, getting his first credited role in 1980. Since then he has appeared in 39 feature films, notably Big Trouble in Little China, Samurai Cop, Samurai Cop 2: Deadly Vengeance, Ninja Academy, 9½ Ninjas!, Ring of Fire, Blade, and G.I. Joe: The Rise of Cobra. Other roles he's played are Kai-Ogi in Mighty Morphin Alien Rangers, a sensei in Power Rangers Wild Force, and Chao Chong in VR Troopers.

== Filmography ==
=== Film ===
Year	Title	Role	Notes
1976	Chesty Anderson, USN	Karate Expert	
1980	The Octagon	Ninja Instructor	
1981	Charlie Chan and the Curse of the Dragon Queen	Club Shanghai Bouncer	
1983	Angel of H.E.A.T.	Hans Zeisel	
1984	Ninja Busters	Master	
1985	My Science Project	Vietnamese Soldier	Uncredited
1985	Sword of Heaven	Third Monk	
1986	Big Trouble in Little China	Wing Kong Hatchet Man	
1989	Ninja Academy	Chiba	
1989	Time Burst: the Final Alliance	Master	
1990	Aftershock	Fighter	
1991	9 1/2 Ninjas!	Master	
1991	Showdown in Little Tokyo	Hagata, the Torturer	
1991	Samurai Cop	Okamura	
1991	Capital Punishment	Henchman	
1991	The Master Demon	The Master Demon	
1991	Karate Wars	Nakaso	
1992	Deadly Bet	Fighter	
1992	Rapid Fire	Tau's Gunman at Laundry	Uncredited
1992	American Streetfighter	Ogawa	
1992	Shadow of the Dragon	Temple Priest	
1993	Ring of Fire II: Blood and Steel	Garbage Gang	
1993	Shootfighter: Fight to the Death	Shootfighting Ref	
1993	Hot Shots! Part Deux	Corrupt Kick Boxing Referee	
1993	Full Impact	Japanese fighter	
1993	Firepower	Fighter	Uncredited
1993	Fit to Kill	Commando	
1994	The Shadow	Tibetan Passenger	
1994	The Dallas Connection	Fu	
1994	Cage II	Dr. Wo	
1995	The Power Within	Yung	
1995	Mortal Kombat	Outworld Warrior	Uncredited
1996	For Life or Death	Ancient priest	
1996	Bloodsport III	Judge	
1996	Day of the Warrior	Fu	
1996	Carnival of Wolves	Bodyguard #2	
1997	Little Bigfoot	Cook	
1998	Blade	Vampire	Uncredited
1998	L.E.T.H.A.L. Ladies: Return to Savage Beach	Fu	
2002	The Circuit 2: The Final Punch	Ming Li	
2002	Redemption	Kwai Lo	
2005	Confessions of an Action Star	Asian Master	
2005	Vampire Assassin	Master Kao	
2009	G.I. Joe: The Rise of Cobra	Hard Master	
2009	Hellbinders	Buddhist Priest	
2015	Samurai Cop 2: Deadly Vengeance	Raizo	

=== Television ===
Year	Title	Role	Notes
1979	A Man Called Sloane	Henchman Guarding Maria	Episode: "Samurai"
1984	Matt Houston	Thug	Episode: "Return to Nam: Part 1"
1985	Knight Rider	Fuji Hakito	Episode: "Knight & Knerd"
1985	J.O.E. and the Colonel	Trainer	Television film
1987	Falcon Crest	Mr. Ito	Episode: "Lovers and Friends"
1996	VR Troopers	Chao Chong	Episode: "Despera Strikes Back"
1996	Mighty Morphin Alien Rangers	Kai-Ogi	Episode: "Along Came a Spider"
2002	Power Rangers Wild Force	Sensei	Episode: "A Father's Footsteps"
2012, 2013	Kickin' It	Grandmaster Po	2 episodes

=== Video games ===
Year	Title	Role	Notes
1997	Blade Runner	Zuben	Voice
2004	SWAT: Warhead One	Peter Chiang	Voice
