= Devin DeVasquez =

American actress and model

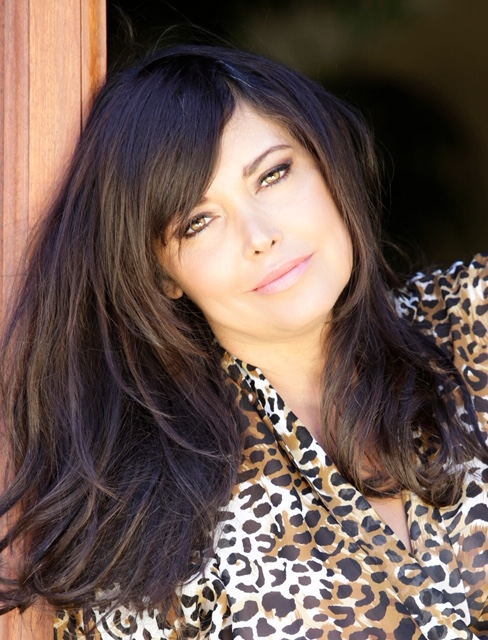

Playboy centerfold appearance
- June 1985
- Preceded by: Kathy Shower
- Succeeded by: Hope Marie Carlton

Personal details
- Born: June 25, 1963 (age 63) Baton Rouge, Louisiana, U.S.
- Height: 5 ft 7 in (1.70 m)
- Official website

Devin Renee DeVasquez (born June 25, 1963) is an American model and actress. She was chosen as Playboy's Playmate of the Month in June 1985, after being featured in the October 1981 issue's college pictorial. Her centerfold was photographed by Richard Fegley.

She appeared in Can't Buy Me Love with Patrick Dempsey and went on to star in Society with Billy Warlock. DeVasquez has appeared in over 100 commercials and authored the book The Naked Truth About a Pinup Model, which is about pin-up modeling and includes an interview with Bettie Page.

To help those who were affected by Hurricane Katrina, DeVasquez created Devin's Kickass Cajun Seasoning and offered it through her business, DevRonn Enterprises.

== Early life ==
Devin DeVasquez was born in Baton Rouge, Louisiana to a father from Madrid, Spain and a mother of Irish descent. She chose the professional name Devin after an Aramis cologne.

== Career ==
DeVasquez won $100,000 on the television talent show Star Search in 1986, and this win led to her being one of the first Hispanic Playmates featured on the cover of the November 1986 Playboy.

DeVasquez authored the books The Naked Truth About a Pinup Model, True Age, Timeless Beauty, My Husband's a Dog, My Wife's a Bitch, and The Day It Snowed in April.

DeVasquez writes for various magazines for Westlake magazine, Splash magazine and Primo magazine for Belgium. She is an active blogger for her website womantowoman.tv and devronnsblog.com, which chronicles her life and travels.

=== Film and television ===
DeVasquez went on to an acting career. She played the virgin in House 2, had a supporting role in the high school film Can't Buy Me Love, and played Clarissa Carlyn in the body horror film Society. In 1989, DeVasquez guest starred in "Her Cups Runneth Over", a third-season episode of the Fox series Married... with Children. She also appeared in the films A Low Down Dirty Shame, Busted, and Guns.

DeVasquez garnered four Daytime Emmy Award nominations as a producer on the Amazon Prime series, The Bay.

== Personal life ==
Devin dated rock star Prince in 1985 and Sylvester Stallone in 1988. She married model Randall Sanford in 1989. In 2003, she told Howard Stern she was single. She married actor and musician Ronn Moss on September 25, 2009.

Joan Bennett	Cherie Witter	Donna Smith	Cindy Brooks	Kathy Shower	Devin DeVasquez
Hope Marie Carlton	Cher Butler	Venice Kong	Cynthia Brimhall	Pamela Saunders	Carol Ficatier
