= List of Playboy Playmates of 1981 =

The following is a list of Playboy Playmates of 1981. Playboy magazine names their Playmate of the Month each month throughout the year.

== January ==
Karen Price

Personal details
- Born: July 17, 1960 (age 66) Pasadena, California, U.S.
- Height: 5 ft 5 in (1.65 m)

Karen Elaina Price (born July 17, 1960) is an American model, stunt woman and television producer. She is sometimes credited as Karen Castoldi. She was Playboy magazine's Playmate of the Month in January 1981. Her centerfold was photographed by Ken Marcus.

After she became a Playmate, Price started acting, but soon switched to performing stunts for over two dozen films, including Leonard Part 6 (1987), Police Academy 2: Their First Assignment (1985), and The Golden Child (1986). After a hiatus, she began a new career as an associate producer of television programs such as Amazing Vacation Homes (2004) and Amazing Babies (2005).

Price made a cameo appearance of sorts in the early Mel Gibson film The Road Warrior – her centerfold is pasted onto a tailfin of Gyro Captain's Benson gyrocopter.

== February ==
Vicki Lasseter

Personal details
- Born: February 19, 1960 (age 66) Iola, Kansas, U.S.
- Height: 5 ft 8 in (1.73 m)

Vicki Lynn Lasseter (born February 19, 1960, in Iola, Kansas) is an American model. She was Playboy magazine's Playmate of the Month for its February 1981 issue. Her centerfold was photographed by Arny Freytag.

== March ==
Kymberly Herrin

Personal details
- Born: October 2, 1957 Santa Barbara County, California, U.S.
- Died: October 28, 2022 (aged 65)
- Height: 5 ft 8 in (1.73 m)

Kymberly Ellen Herrin (October 2, 1957 – October 28, 2022) was an American model and actress. She was Playboy magazine's Playmate of the Month for its March 1981 issue. Her centerfold was photographed by Arny Freytag. Herrin had several small roles in films of the '80s, such as Ghostbusters and Romancing the Stone, as well as the ZZ Top videos "Legs" and "Sleeping Bag". She starred in Beverly Hills Cop II alongside with Ola Ray, Alana Saores, Venice Kong, Luann Lee, Rebecca Ferratti and Kymberly Paige.

== April ==
Lorraine Michaels

Personal details
- Born: January 23, 1958 (age 68) Canterbury, England
- Height: 5 ft 3 in (1.60 m)

Lorraine Michaels (born January 23, 1958, in Canterbury, England) is an English model and actress. She was chosen as Playboy magazine's Playmate of the Month in for the April 1981 issue.

== May ==
Gina Goldberg

Personal details
- Born: Tiina Virenius; June 30, 1959 (age 67) Turku, Finland
- Height: 5 ft 5 in (1.65 m)

Gina Goldberg (born Tiina Virenius June 30, 1959 in Turku) is a Finnish model, actress and singer. She was Playboy magazine's Playmate of the Month for its May 1981 issue.

== June ==
Cathy Larmouth

Personal details
- Born: July 15, 1953 Torrance, California, U.S.
- Died: January 4, 2007 (aged 53)
- Height: 5 ft 8 in (1.73 m)

Cathy Larmouth (July 15, 1953 – January 4, 2007) was an American model who was Playboy magazine's Playmate of the Month for its June 1981 issue. Her centerfold was photographed by Ken Marcus. A year after her centerfold, she appeared as a contestant on The Joker's Wild winning several games.

Larmouth died on January 4, 2007, of a heart attack at the age of 53, after a period of declining health.

== July ==
Heidi Sorenson

Personal details
- Born: August 5, 1960 (age 66) Vancouver, Canada
- Height: 5 ft 8 in (1.73 m)

Heidi Sorenson (born in Vancouver, British Columbia on August 5, 1960) is a Canadian model and actress. She was Playboy magazine's Playmate of the Month for its July 1981 issue.

She was in the 1985 vampire horror film Fright Night as well as the 1985 comedy Spies Like Us and the 1987 comedy Roxanne.

== August ==
Debbie Boostrom

Personal details
- Born: June 23, 1955 Peoria, Illinois, U.S.
- Died: July 29, 2008 (aged 53) Florida, U.S.
- Height: 5 ft 4 in (1.63 m)

Debbie Boostrom (born June 23, 1955, Peoria, Illinois, d. July 29, 2008) was an American model. She was Playboy magazine's Playmate of the Month for its August 1981 issue. Her centerfold was photographed by Mario Casilli while she was living in Florida. Boostrom subsequently married and relocated to Kansas. Following the end of the marriage she moved to Florida to design jewelry and act in infomercials. On July 29, 2008, she was found dead in her apartment of a self-inflicted gunshot wound. She had reportedly been suffering from terminal breast cancer.

== September ==
Susan Smith

Personal details
- Born: January 14, 1959 (age 67) Beloit, Wisconsin, U.S.
- Height: 5 ft 8 in (1.73 m)

Susan M. Smith (born January 14, 1959, in Beloit, Wisconsin) is an American model and actress. She was Playboy magazine's Playmate of the Month for its September 1981 issue. Her centerfold was photographed by Ken Marcus and Robert Scott Hooper.

Susan first appeared in Playboy in the February 1979 pictorial "The Girls of Las Vegas." She also "wrestled" Andy Kaufman for the "intergender championship of the world" for a February 1982 layout, and did occasional ring announcing in the World Wrestling Federation during the mid-1990s.

== October ==
Kelly Tough

Personal details
- Born: December 16, 1961 (age 64) Vancouver, Canada
- Height: 5 ft 7 in (1.70 m)

Kelly Ann Tough (born December 16, 1961, in Vancouver, British Columbia) is a Canadian model and actress. She was Playboy magazine's Playmate of the Month for its October 1981 issue. Her centerfold was photographed by Mario Casilli.

== November ==
Shannon Tweed
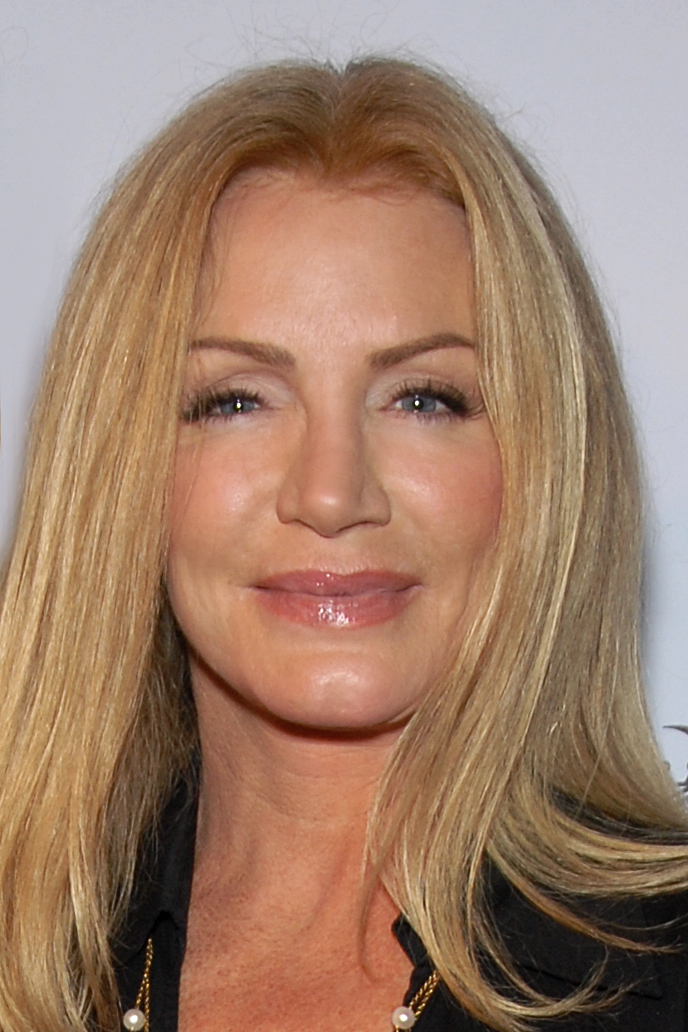
- Shannon Tweed at the 2nd Annual Night of 1000 Stars. Ritual Supper Club, Hollywood, California

Playboy Playmate of the Year
- 1982
- Preceded by: Terri Welles
- Succeeded by: Marianne Gravatte

Personal details
- Born: Shannon Lee Tweed; March 10, 1957 (age 69) St. John's, Newfoundland and Labrador, Canada
- Height: 5 ft 10 in (1.78 m)

Shannon Lee Tweed (born March 10, 1957) is a Canadian actress and model. One of the most successful actresses of mainstream erotica, she is identified with the genre of the erotic thriller. Tweed currently lives with her husband Gene Simmons of Kiss and they have two children.

== December ==
Patricia Farinelli

Personal details
- Born: March 18, 1960 (age 66) Los Angeles, California, U.S.
- Height: 5 ft 3 in (1.60 m)

Patricia "Patti" Farinelli (born March 18, 1960, in Los Angeles, California), is an Italian-American model and actress. She was Playboy magazine's Playmate of the Month for the December 1981 issue. Her centerfold was photographed by Ken Marcus.

== See also ==
- List of people in Playboy 1980–1989

Karen Price	Vicki Lasseter	Kymberly Herrin	Lorraine Michaels	Gina Goldberg	Cathy Larmouth
Heidi Sorenson	Debbie Boostrom	Susan Smith	Kelly Tough	Shannon Tweed	Patricia Farinelli
