= Julie Strain =

American actress and model (1962–2021)

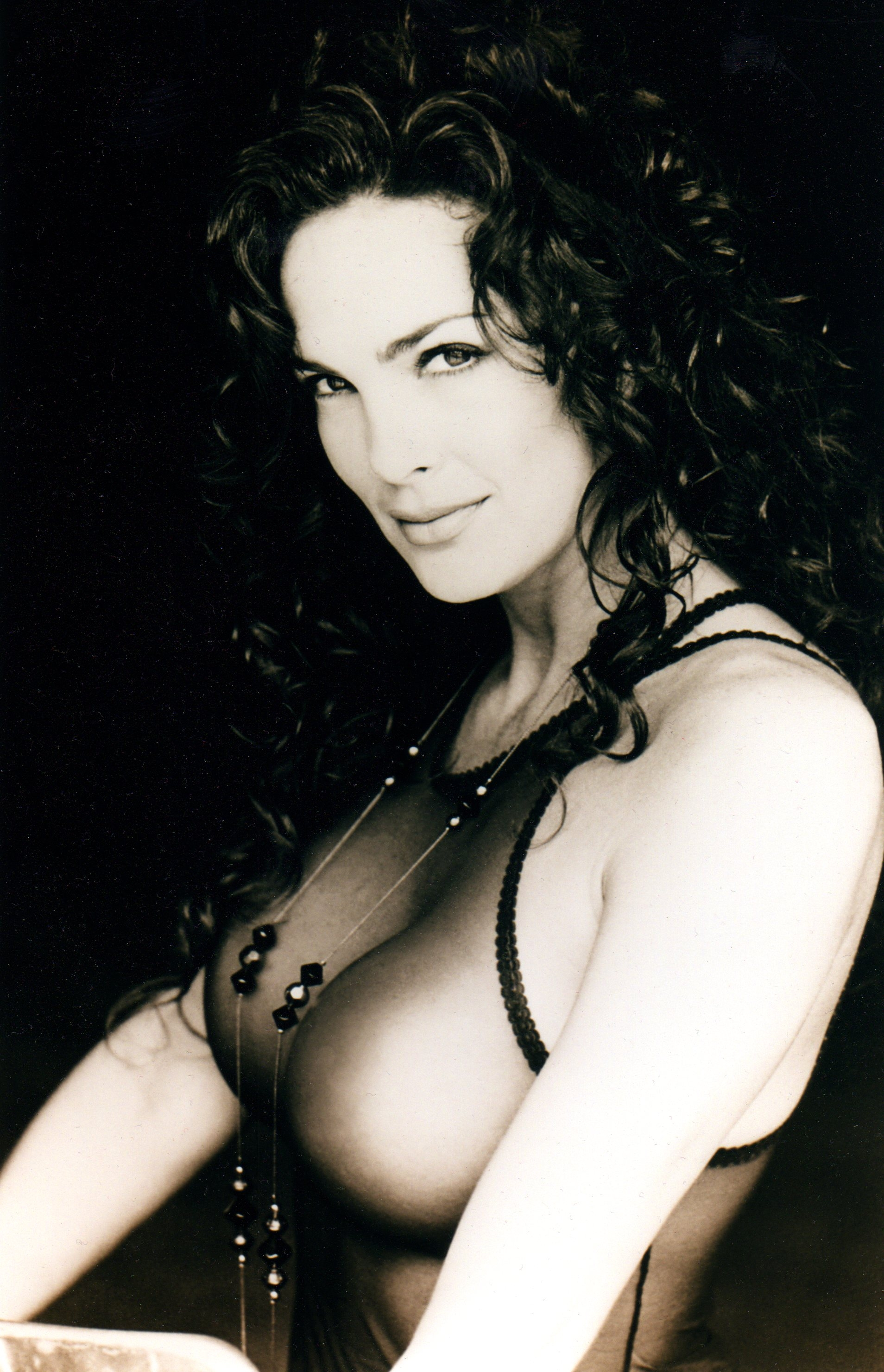
- Born: Julie Ann Strain; February 18, 1962; Concord, California, U.S
- Died: January 10, 2021 (aged 58); Corona, California, U.S
- Education: Diablo Valley College
- Occupations: Actress; model
- Years active: 1990–2019
- Height: 6 ft 1 in (1.85 m)
- Spouse: Kevin Eastman (m. 1995; div. 2006)
- Partner: Dave Gram

Julie Ann Strain (February 18, 1962 – January 10, 2021) was an American actress and model. She was chosen by Penthouse as Pet of the Month in June 1991 and Pet of the Year in 1993. Her biggest mainstream acting role was Julie, the protagonist in Heavy Metal 2000.

== Early life ==
Julie Ann Strain was born in Concord, California on February 18, 1962. A graduate of Diablo Valley College, she had an extensive athletic background. She moved to Las Vegas to begin her professional career, and later relocated to Hollywood, California.

== Career ==
Julie Strain was Penthouse Pet of the Month for June 1991 and Penthouse Pet of the Year for 1993.

With over 100 films to her credit, Strain was nicknamed the "Queen of B-movies". She modelled for many comic book artists, including Simon Bisley, Milo Manara, and Kevin Eastman, whom she would later marry. Her likeness was also used in animation. She provided the voice for the main character in the animated film Heavy Metal 2000, and was the basis for the third-person shooter video game Heavy Metal: F.A.K.K. 2. She was a frequent guest panelist at comic book conventions like San Diego Comic-Con.

Strain was one of the main subjects and was interviewed for the documentaries Some Nudity Required (1998) and Something to Scream About (2004). Her sister, Lizzy Strain, was interviewed for the latter as well, but did not make the final cut. As a favor to Julie, Lizzy's interview was included as a Bonus Feature on the DVD release.

In 1997, Heavy Metal published Strain's autobiography, Six Foot One and Worth the Climb. It was heavily illustrated with stills from her film and modelling career, plus paintings by Boris Vallejo, Julie Bell and Olivia De Berardinis.

== Personal life and death ==
Strain was 6 ft 1 in (1.85 m) tall. From 1995 to 2006, she was married to Kevin Eastman, co-creator of the Teenage Mutant Ninja Turtles. Eastman co-starred in several of Strain's films such as Day of the Warrior and L.E.T.H.A.L. Ladies: Return to Savage Beach.

In her 20s, Strain fell off a horse and thereby suffered severe back and head trauma; the latter led to her development of retrograde amnesia. By November 2018, her boyfriend Dave Gram announced that she was in the late stages of dementia, believed to be a result of the fall; she was receiving hospice care at home.

In January 2020, Malibu Bay Films, a studio which Strain worked with frequently, incorrectly reported that she had died; the studio quickly retracted their statement after it established the news had been an error. Strain actually died on January 10, 2021, at age 58.

== Partial filmography ==
Year	Film	Role	Other notes
1990	Repossessed	Aerobics / Locker Room Nude Girl	(uncredited)
1991	Midnight Heat	Carl's Breakfast Girl / Silver Statuette	a.k.a. Sunset Heat
1991	Out for Justice	Roxanne Ford	
1991	Double Impact	Student	
1992	Soulmates	Pretty Woman	a.k.a. Blood Love (UK video title) / a.k.a. Evil Lives (USA video title)
1992	Kuffs	Kane's Girl	
1992	Mirror Images	Gina Kaye	
1992	Witchcraft IV: The Virgin Heart	Belladonna	
1992	Night Rhythms	Linda	
1992	The Unnamable II: The Statement of Randolph Carter	Creature	a.k.a. H.P. Lovecraft's The Unnamable Returns / a.k.a. The Unnamable Returns
1993	Love Bites	Female Jogger	a.k.a. Love Bites: The Reluctant Vampire (USA)
1993	Psycho Cop Returns	Stephanie	a.k.a. Psycho Cop 2 (USA video box title)
1993	Enemy Gold	Jewel Panther	
1993	Love Is Like That	Amber	a.k.a. Bad Love / a.k.a. Wild Angel
1993	Fit to Kill	Blu Steele	
1993	Teasers	Diva	
1994	Play Time	Sheraton	
1994	The Devil's Pet	Queen of Lost Island	
1994	Naked Gun 33 1/3: The Final Insult	Dominatrix	
1994	Beverly Hills Cop III	Annihilator Girl #2	
1994	Infernal Soldiers	Tess	a.k.a. The Mosaic Project (video title)
1994	The Dallas Connection	Black Widow	
1994	Baywatch	Windsurfer	(uncredited); Episode: Red Wind / a.k.a. Baywatch Hawaii (USA new title)
1995	Takin' It Off Out West	Mary 'Mad Mary'	
1995	Big Sister 2000	Interrogator	
1995	Starstruck	Johanna	
1995	Blonde Heaven	Illyana	a.k.a. Morgana (USA DVD title) / a.k.a. Morganna (USA video title)
1995	Johnny Mnemonic: The Interactive Action Movie	Pretty	
1995	Temptress II	Erica Barnes	a.k.a. Sorceress
1995	Dark Secrets	Mauri	
1995	Victim of Desire	Linda Hammond	a.k.a. Implicated
1995	Midnight Confessions	Mariana	a.k.a. Voices of Seduction (UK video title)
1995	Virtual Desire	Sascha	
1996	Squanderers	Jill	a.k.a. Money to Burn
1996	Day of the Warrior	Willow Black	a.k.a. L.E.T.H.A.L. Ladies: Day of the Warrior
1996	Hollywood: The Movie	Dora	
1996	Red Line	Crystal	
1997	The Last Road	Maggie	a.k.a. SpeedWay (USA video title)
1997	Hollywood Cops	Madam Fortune Stella	
1997	Busted	Annette	
1997	Bikini Hotel	Raquel	
1997	Guns of El Chupacabra	Queen B	
1997	Lethal Seduction	Holly	a.k.a. Lethal Betrayal
1997	Sorceress II: The Temptress	Tara Coventry	a.k.a. Legion of Evil: Sorceress II (UK DVD title) / a.k.a. Sorceress 2 (USA short title)
1998	Masseuse 3	Sascha	a.k.a. Indiscretions (USA)
1998	L.E.T.H.A.L. Ladies: Return to Savage Beach	Willow Black	
1998	Armageddon Boulevard	Queen Bee	
1998	Sex Court (TV series)	Judge Julie	
1999	Ride with the Devil	The Temptress	
1999	Wasteland Justice	Raven	
1999	Desirable Liaisons (TV series)	Colonel Fedorova	
1999	Bloodthirsty	New Roommate / Narrator	a.k.a. Blood Thirsty (USA video box title)
1999	Captain Jackson (TV series)	Robot Mommy	
2000	The Independent	Ms. Kevorkian	
2000	Heavy Metal 2000	Julie (voice)	Heavy Metal F.A.K.K.2 (Germany)
2000	The Rowdy Girls	Mick	
2000	The Bare Wench Project	The Bare Wench	
2000	Heavy Metal: F.A.K.K. 2	Julie (voice)	Video game
2000	Centerfold Coeds: Girlfriends	Miss Hardy	
2001	Sex Court: The Movie	Judge Julie	
2001	The Bare Wench Project 2: Scared Topless	The Bare Wench	Bare Wench 2: Book of Babes (USA) / a.k.a. Book of Babes: Bare Wench 2 (USA video box title)
2001	BattleQueen 2020	Gayle	a.k.a. Battle Queen 2020 (USA)
2001	The Man Show (TV series)	Stripper	Episode: Sperm Bank
2001	How to Make a Monster	Herself	
2002	God Squad!	Julie	
2002	Thirteen Erotic Ghosts	Baroness Lucrezia	
2002	.com for Murder	Exotic dancer	
2002	Planet of the Erotic Ape	Unknown	a.k.a. Babes in Kongland or World of the Erotic Ape (USA DVD titles)
2002	The Bare Wench Project 3: Nymphs of Mystery Mountain	The Bare Wench	a.k.a. Bare Wench III: The Path of the Wicked (USA) / a.k.a. Bare Wench: The Path of the Wicked (USA DVD title)
2002	Bleed	Linda	
2003	HorrorTales.666	Unknown	
2003	Baberellas	Coochinota	
2003	Birth Rite	Ms. Carlson	
2003	Zombiegeddon	Dispatcher	
2003	Delta Delta Die!	Marilyn Fitch	
2003	Rock n' Roll Cops 2: The Adventure Begins	Stella	a.k.a. The Rock n' Roll Cops (USA DVD title)
2003	Bare Wench Project: Uncensored	The Bare Wench	
2004	Tales from the Crapper	Ivanna Dance / Samantha	
	Something to Scream About	Herself	DVD features her sister Lizzy Strain.
2005	Bare Wench: The Final Chapter	Bare Wench	
2005	Azira: Blood from the Sand	Azira	
2005	No Pain, No Gain	Amazon Beach Goddess	
2005	Exterminator City	Unknown	
2007	Chantal	Sinister Model	
2007	Hollywood Scream Queens	Herself	
2008	Magus	Madame Zelda	
2009	Space Girls in Beverly Hills	Queen Ziba	Final film role

1970s	Evelyn Treacher	Stephanie McLean	Tina McDowall	Patricia Barrett	Avril Lund
1970s	Anneka Di Lorenzo	Laura Bennett Doone	Victoria Lynn Johnson	Dominique Maure	Cheryl Rixon
1980s	Isabella Ardigo	Danielle Deneux	Corinne Alphen	Sheila Kennedy	Linda Kenton
1980s	None	Cody Carmack	Mindy Farrar	Patty Mullen	Ginger Miller
1990s	Stephanie Page	Simone Brigitte	Jisel	Julie Strain	Sasha Vinni
1990s	Gina LaMarca	Andi Sue Irwin	Elizabeth Ann Hilden	Paige Summers	Nikie St. Gilles
2000s	Juliet Cariaga	Zdeňka Podkapová	Megan Mason	Sunny Leone	Victoria Zdrok
2000s	Martina Warren	Jamie Lynn	Heather Vandeven	Erica Ellyson	Taya Parker
2010s	Taylor Vixen	Nikki Benz	Jenna Rose	Nicole Aniston	Lexi Belle
2010s	Layla Sin	Kenna James	Jenna Sativa	Gina Valentina	Gianna Dior
2020s	Lacy Lennon	Kenzie Anne	Amber Marie	Tahlia Paris	Renee Olstead
2020s	Kassie Wallis	-	-	-	-
