= Harold Diamond =

American art dealer (1926–1982)

- Born: 1926
- Died: 1982 (aged 55–56)
- Occupation: Art dealer
- Spouse: Hester Klein
- Children: Mike D

Harold Diamond (1926–1982) was an American art dealer. Diamond worked as a teacher in New York City's public school system, later becoming an art dealer specializing in 20th-century work. He worked as a private dealer, negotiating for the discreet sale of works of art from their usually European owners to buyers who were typically American, and was known for his refusal to reveal the names of either sellers or buyers.

Diamond and his wife Hester Diamond (née Klein; 1928–2020) assembled "one of the great postwar collections of modern art in New York". Their son Michael Diamond (Mike D) is a musician, and a founding member of the Beastie Boys.
