= Edwin Malave =

American boxer and actor (born 1950)

Edwin Malave (born August 4, 1950), better known as Chu Chu Malave, is an American former professional boxer, actor, and writer.

== Boxing career ==
On February 23, 1970, at the age of 19, Malave, a two-time New York Golden Gloves champ, had his first professional boxing match against Ruben DeJesus, beating him in four rounds by unanimous decision in New York's Audubon Ballroom in Harlem. Malave, however, lost his second fight against Freytes Caban who came into the match with a 5-1 record, decisioning Malave in a close fight March 16 that same year. Malave had won nine of his next ten bouts, including a rematch against Freytus Caban, avenging the defeat of the previous meeting by winning a unanimous decision. His only defeat in a string of victories was against Doc McClendon, a journeyman boxer.

With a record of 10-2 and 5 knockouts, Malave faced Harold Weston, who would later become a world title challenger. Harold Weston came into the August 9, 1971 match with a 12-1 record. Malave won by a split decision. Malave had a streak of 10 fights without a loss, winning 8 fights with two draws. He defeated Harold Weston in the rematch at the Garden by unanimous decision and had a rematch against Pat Murphy at the Felt Forum that was a draw. He became the fifth ranked lightweight contender after his knockout victory over the Commonwealth lightweight champion Percy Hayles from Kingston, Jamaica, at the Felt Forum.

On June 4, 1973, at the Felt Forum, Madison Square Garden, New York, Malave lost to Ray Lampkin by an eighth-round knockout. Malave took a fight in Boston, Mass. against Greg Joiner, winning by a knockout in the 3rd round. Then he faced former World Lightweight Champion Ken Buchanan, losing by a TKO in the 7th round September 1, 1973, which turned out to be his last professional boxing match.

== Acting career ==
Malave studied acting at Herbert Berghoff Studios in the West Village, while pursuing his budding career as a professional boxer. He acted in a number of plays at various playhouses around New York. He got his first lead role in Miguel Piñero's Short Eyes at Lincoln Center where he received rave reviews from The New York Times. He played the role of "Ramon Santos" in the Barney Miller pilot for ABC, reprising the role when the episode was re-shot for Season One. He later appeared in two other episodes of that sitcom, portraying a different character each time.

He also co-starred in the short lived series Chopper One for NBC, and played a role in Dog Day Afternoon with Al Pacino. He then landed a role in Deadly Hero with Don Murray and James Earl Jones. ABC flew Chu Chu back to LA to reshoot the Barney Miller pilot. He moved to Los Angeles in 1975 and remained there for the rest of his acting career, except for a one-year stint in New York for a starring role in the NBC soap opera For Richer, for Poorer in 1978. In 1979 he co-starred in The Main Event, starring Barbra Streisand and Ryan O'Neal. That same year he had a role playing Rudy in the Chuck Norris film A Force of One. His acting career includes over 20 guest starring and co-starring roles in film and television.
