= List of Playboy Playmates of 1985 =

The following is a list of Playboy Playmates of 1985. Playboy magazine names its Playmate of the Month each month throughout the year.

== January ==
Joan Bennett

Personal details
- Born: August 30, 1964 (age 62) Chicago, Illinois, U.S.
- Height: 5 ft 8 in (1.73 m)

Joan Bennett (Note: Not be confused with other people called Joan Bennett) (born August 30, 1964, in Chicago, Illinois) is a former American model. She was Playboy magazine's Playmate of the Month for January 1985. Following Playboy she pursued a career as a professional model.

== February ==
Cherie Witter

Personal details
- Born: October 22, 1963 (age 63) Everett, Washington, U.S.
- Height: 5 ft 9 in (1.75 m)

Cherie Witter (born October 22, 1963) is an American model and actress. She was chosen as Playboy's Playmate of the Month for February 1985.

== March ==
Donna Smith

Personal details
- Born: March 15, 1960 (age 66) Portland, Oregon, U.S.
- Height: 5 ft 7 in (1.70 m)

Donna Smith (born March 15, 1960, in Portland, Oregon) is an American model. She was the March 1985 Playboy Playmate of the Month.

== April ==
Cindy Brooks

Personal details
- Born: November 5, 1951 (age 74) Gettysburg, Pennsylvania, U.S.
- Height: 5 ft 7 in (1.70 m)

Cindy Brooks (born November 5, 1951) is an American model and actress. She was chosen as Playboy's Playmate of the Month in April 1985. She briefly held a regular role on Days of Our Lives in 1989.

== May ==
Kathy Shower
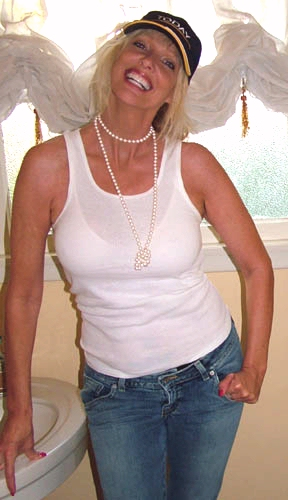
- Kathy Shower c. 2005

Playboy Playmate of the Year
- 1986
- Preceded by: Karen Velez
- Succeeded by: Donna Edmondson

Personal details
- Born: Kathleen Ann Shower; March 8, 1953 (age 73) Brookville, Ohio, U.S.
- Height: 5 ft 9 in (1.75 m)

Kathleen Ann Shower (born March 8, 1953) is an American model and actress. Known as Kathy Shower she is Playboy's Playmate of the Month for May 1985 and Playmate of the Year for 1986.

Following Playboy, Shower had an acting career, mainly within the action adventure (American Kickboxer 2, The Further Adventures of Tennessee Buck) and erotic thriller genres (Boundaries, LA Goddess and Velvet Dreams), as well as TV work including a continuing role in Santa Barbara. In 2009, Shower completed an independent film entitled Kathy Shower: Playmate Model Mom.

== June ==
Devin DeVasquez
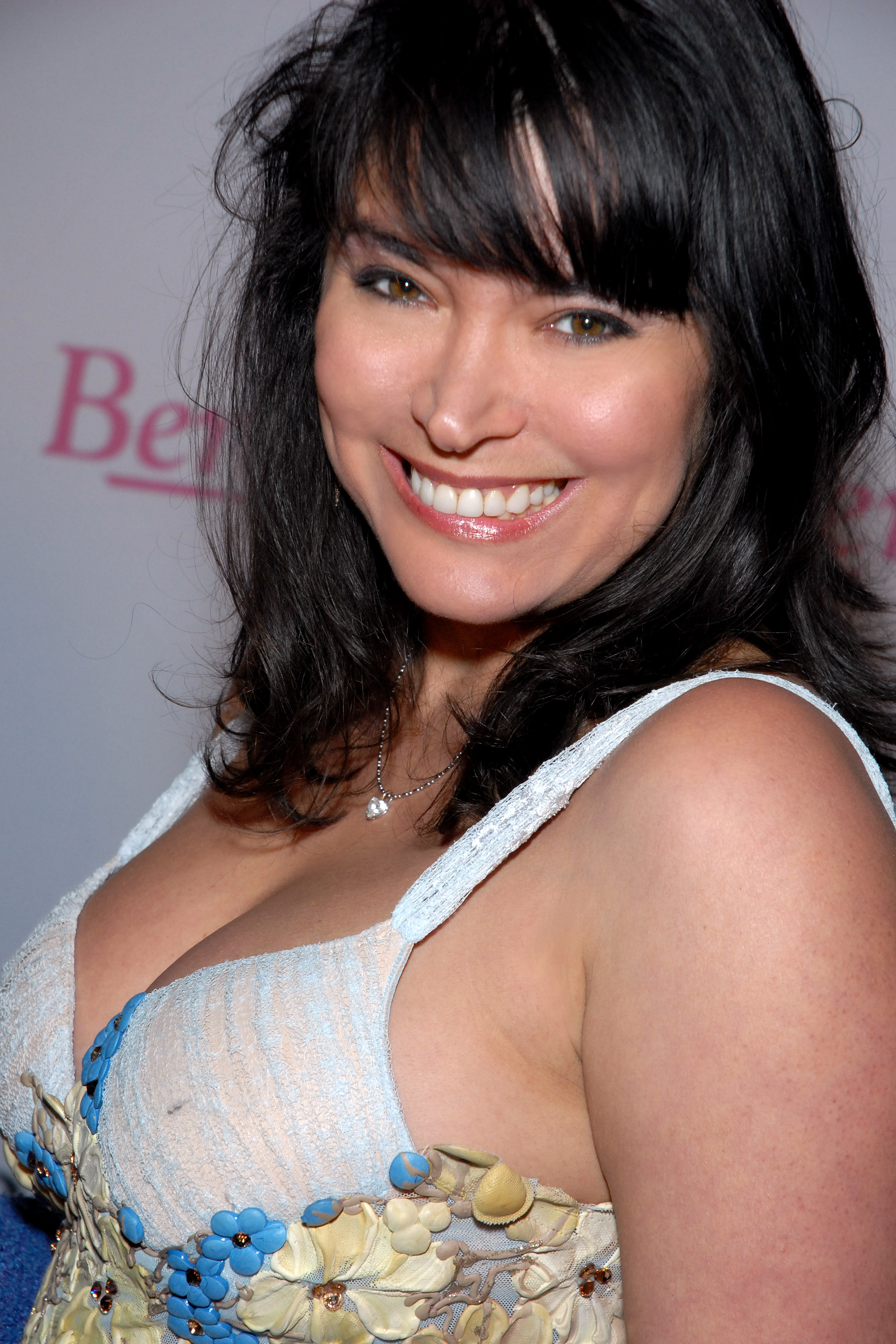
- Devin Devasquez attending the Benchwarmer Valentines Party at Area, Hollywood, California on 02/12/2008

Personal details
- Born: June 25, 1963 (age 63) Baton Rouge, Louisiana, U.S.
- Height: 5 ft 7 in (1.70 m)

Devin Renee DeVasquez (born June 25, 1963, in Baton Rouge, Louisiana) is an American model and actress. She was chosen as Playboy's Playmate of the Month in June 1985. Her centerfold was photographed by Richard Fegley.

DeVasquez has appeared in over 100 commercials and authored the book The Naked Truth About A Pinup Model. She is married to actor Ronn Moss.

== July ==
Hope Marie Carlton

Personal details
- Born: March 3, 1966 (age 60) Riverhead, New York, U.S.
- Height: 5 ft 7 in (1.70 m)

Hope Marie Carlton (born March 3, 1966, in Riverhead NY), an American model and actress, was Playboy magazine's Playmate of the Month for the July 1985 issue. She married Robert Keith Levin in 1991; the couple divorced in 2005. She is known for starring in the movies Hard Ticket to Hawaii (1987), Savage Beach (1989), Slumber Party Massacre III (1990) and Bloodmatch (1991), as well as for her cameo in A Nightmare on Elm Street 4 (1988). Some of her later roles are credited to "Hope Levin."

== August ==
Cher Butler

Personal details
- Born: March 6, 1964 (age 62) Garland, Texas, U.S.
- Height: 5 ft 7 in (1.70 m)

Cher Butler (born March 6, 1964) is an American model and actress. She was chosen as Playboy's Playmate of the Month for August 1985. In her only film role, the female lead in Crack House (1989), she was billed as "Cheryl Kay".

== September ==
Venice Kong

Personal details
- Born: 17 December 1961 (age 64) Saint Mary Parish, Jamaica
- Height: 5 ft 5 in (1.65 m)

Venice Kong (born 17 December 1961 in St. Mary, Jamaica) is a Jamaican model and actress of Chinese-Jamaican heritage. She was chosen as Playboy's Playmate of the Month in September 1985.

== October ==
Cynthia Brimhall

Personal details
- Born: March 10, 1964 (age 62) Ogden, Utah, U.S.
- Height: 5 ft 8.5 in (1.74 m)

Cynthia Brimhall (born March 10, 1964, in Ogden, Utah) is an American model and B-movie actress. She was chosen as Playboy's Playmate of the Month in October 1985. She went on to perform in several Andy Sidaris films and appeared on The Price Is Right as one of "Barker's Beauties."

Hers was the first centerfold to appear without the famous staple, as Playboy moved to a new binding method.

== November ==
Pamela Saunders

Personal details
- Born: July 9, 1963 (age 63) Miami, Florida, U.S.
- Height: 5 ft 5 in (1.65 m)

Pamela Saunders (born July 9, 1963, in Miami) is an American model. She was Playboy magazine's Playmate of the Month for its November 1985 issue.

== December ==
Carol Ficatier

Personal details
- Born: 20 February 1958 (age 68) Auxerre, France
- Height: 5 ft 7 in (1.70 m)

Carol Ficatier de Beaufort (born 20 February 1958 in Auxerre, France) is a French model and actress. She was chosen as Playboy's Playmate of the Month for December 1985. In 1993, Ficatier moved to Rome, Italy to study art history.

== See also ==
- List of people in Playboy 1980–1989

== Notes ==
Joan Bennett	Cherie Witter	Donna Smith	Cindy Brooks	Kathy Shower	Devin DeVasquez
Hope Marie Carlton	Cher Butler	Venice Kong	Cynthia Brimhall	Pamela Saunders	Carol Ficatier
