= List of Playboy Playmates of 1984 =

The following is a list of Playboy Playmates of 1984, the 30th anniversary year of the publication. Playboy magazine names their Playmate of the Month each month throughout the year.

== January ==
Penny Baker

Personal details
- Born: October 5, 1965 (age 61) Buffalo, New York, U.S.
- Height: 5 ft 8 in (1.73 m)

Penny Baker (born October 5, 1965) is an American model and actress. After being interviewed in Chicago, she was chosen as Playboy's Playmate of the Month for January 1984, the 30th Anniversary Playmate. Her photos were shot by Arny Freytag in New York City, Buffalo, and Los Angeles when she was 17, with written permission from her parents. Her pictorial was titled "Lucky Penny" and it reported her age as 18.

== February ==
Justine Greiner

Personal details
- Born: November 19, 1963 (age 62) Boston, Massachusetts, U.S.
- Height: 5 ft 9 in (1.75 m)

Justine Greiner (born November 19, 1963) is a former American model. She was chosen as Playboy's Playmate of the Month for February 1984. Her sister is Corinne Lee, poet and author of PYX, winner of the 2004 National Poetry Series.

== March ==
Dona Speir

Personal details
- Born: February 7, 1964 (age 62) Norwalk, California, U.S.
- Height: 5 ft 7 in (1.70 m)

Dona L. Speir (born February 7, 1964) is an American model and B movie actress. She was chosen as Playboy's Playmate of the Month for March 1984. Her centerfold was photographed by Arny Freytag. Speir studied film acting with R. J. Adams at The Actors Workshop, Orange County, and went on to star in several sexploitation–action films by Andy Sidaris, including Hard Hunted (1993).

== April ==
Lesa Ann Pedriana

Personal details
- Born: November 24, 1962 (age 63) Milwaukee, Wisconsin, U.S.
- Height: 5 ft 5 in (1.65 m)

Lesa Ann Pedriana (born November 24, 1962, in Milwaukee, Wisconsin) is an American model and actress. She was Playboy magazine's Playmate of the Month for its April 1984 issue. Her centerfold was photographed by Stephen Wayda.

== May ==
Patty Duffek

Personal details
- Born: August 27, 1963 (age 63) Woodland Hills, California, U.S.
- Height: 5 ft 5 in (1.65 m)

Patty Duffek (born August 27, 1963) is an American model and actress. She was chosen as Playboy's Playmate of the Month for May 1984.

== June ==
Tricia Lange

Personal details
- Born: April 24, 1957 (age 69) Hollywood, California, U.S.
- Height: 5 ft 7 in (1.70 m)

Tricia Lange (born April 24, 1957) is an American model and actress. She was Playboy magazine's Playmate of the Month for its June 1984 issue. Her centerfold was photographed by Richard Fegley.

== July ==
Liz Stewart
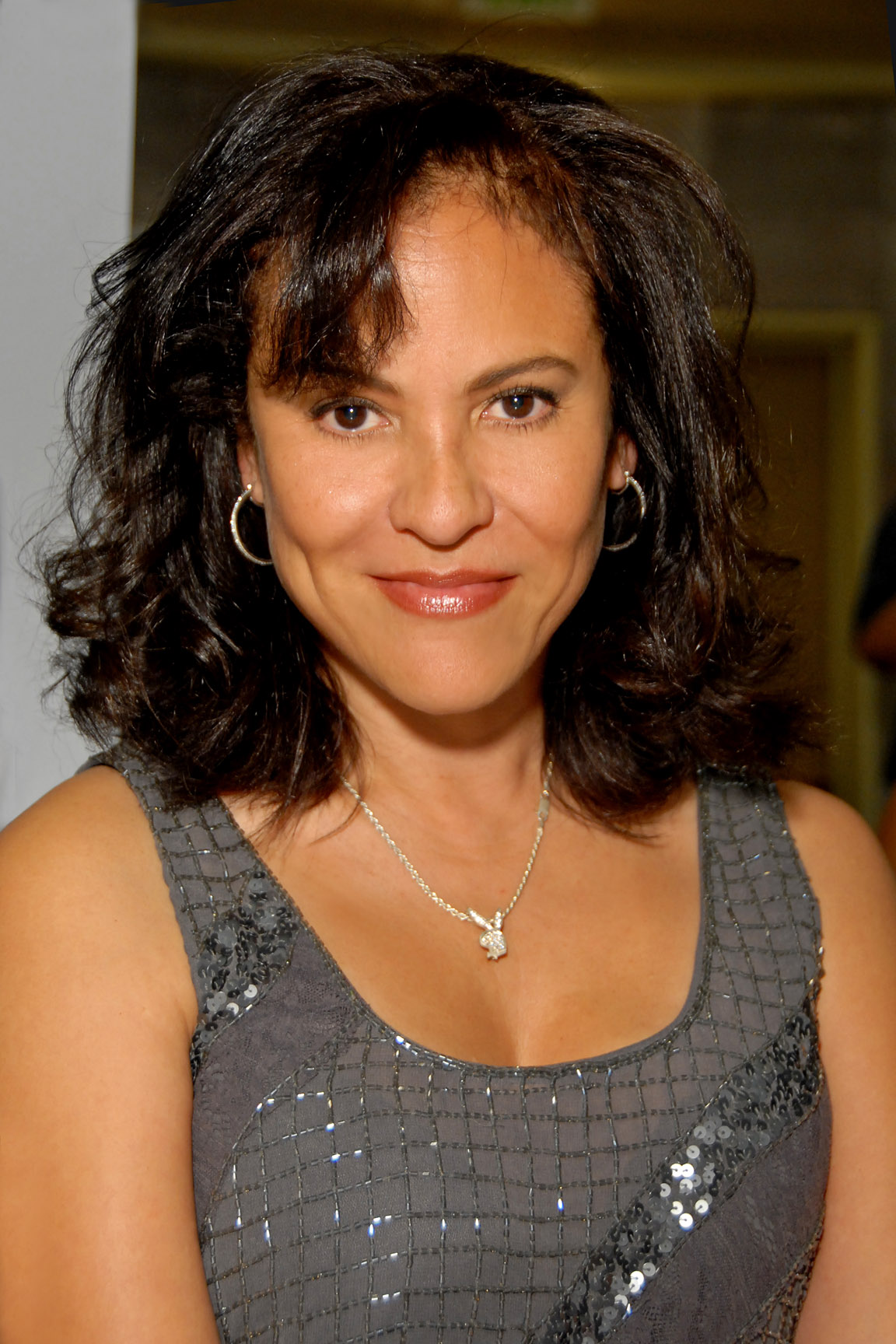
- Liz Stewart, Long Beach, California on November 5, 2011

Personal details
- Born: July 3, 1961 (age 65) San Francisco, California, U.S.
- Height: 5 ft 7 in (1.70 m)

Liz Stewart (born July 3, 1961) is an American interior designer, model, and actress. She was chosen as Playboy's Playmate of the Month for July 1984.

== August ==
Suzi Schott

Personal details
- Born: July 19, 1961 (age 65) Springfield, Illinois, U.S.
- Height: 5 ft 8.5 in (1.74 m)

Suzi Schott (born July 19, 1961) is an American model and actress. She was chosen as Playboy's Playmate of the Month for August 1984. Her centerfold was photographed by David Mecey.

== September ==
Kimberly Evenson

Personal details
- Born: November 3, 1962 (age 63) Bremerhaven, Germany
- Height: 5 ft 3 in (1.60 m)

Kimberly Evenson (born November 3, 1962, in Bremerhaven, Germany) is an American model and actress. She was Playboy magazine's Playmate of the Month for its September 1984 issue. Her centerfold was photographed by Arny Freytag. She also appeared in the 1985 teen sex comedies The Big Bet and Porky's Revenge!.

== October ==
Debi Nicolle Johnson

Personal details
- Born: March 13, 1958 (age 68) Torrance, California, U.S.
- Height: 5 ft 5 in (1.65 m)

Debi Nicolle Johnson (born March 13, 1958) is an American model and actress. She was chosen as Playboy's Playmate of the Month for October 1984.

== November ==
Roberta Vasquez

Personal details
- Born: February 13, 1963 (age 63) Los Angeles, California, U.S.
- Height: 5 ft 8 in (1.73 m)

Roberta Vasquez (born February 13, 1963) is an American model and B movie actress. She was Playboy's Playmate of the Month for November 1984. Vasquez went on to star in several sexploitation–action films in the late-1980s and early-1990s written and directed by Andy Sidaris. She has worked as a California State Police officer as well as playing an officer in the 1990 Clint Eastwood buddy cop film, The Rookie. She later went back to school and, in 1997, was enrolled at Santa Monica College, taking classes in biology and other subjects.

== December ==
Karen Velez

Playboy Playmate of the Year
- 1985
- Preceded by: Barbara Edwards
- Succeeded by: Kathy Shower

Personal details
- Born: January 27, 1961 Rockville Centre, New York, U.S.
- Died: July 2, 2023 (aged 62)
- Height: 5 ft 7 in (1.70 m)

Karen Velez (January 27, 1961 – July 2, 2023) was a Puerto Rican-American model. She was Playboy magazine's Playmate of the Month for December 1984, and was later named as 1985's Playmate of the Year. She was the cover model for the maiden issue of Playmate Review.

She was married to actor Lee Majors from 1988 to their divorce in 1994 and was known also as Karen Majors. The marriage produced one daughter, Nikki Majors, and twin sons, Dane Majors and Trey Majors. Nikki Majors posed for the Playboy Cyber Club pictorial called "Playmate Daughters" in March 2008.

Velez died on Sunday, July 2, 2023. No cause of death was given.

== See also ==
- List of people in Playboy 1980–1989

Penny Baker	Justine Greiner	Dona Speir	Lesa Ann Pedriana	Patty Duffek	Tricia Lange
Liz Stewart	Suzi Schott	Kimberly Evenson	Debi Johnson	Roberta Vasquez	Karen Velez
