= Girls with guns =

Sub-genre of action films and animation

Girls with guns is a subgenre of action fiction that portrays a female protagonist engaged in shootouts. The genre typically involves gun-play, stunts and martial arts action.

== History ==
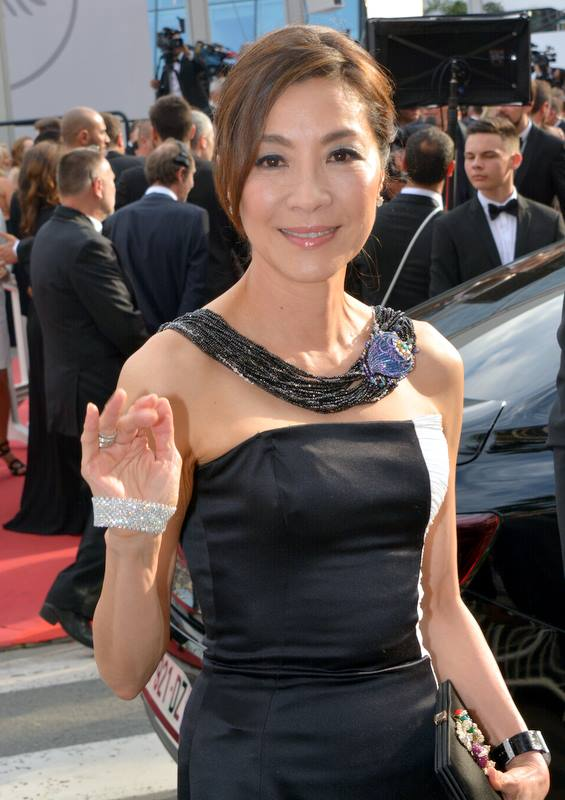
Actress Michelle Yeoh

The 1985 Hong Kong film Yes, Madam, directed by Corey Yuen and starring Michelle Yeoh and Cynthia Rothrock, was described by film and gender scholar Lisa Funnell as the first "girls with guns" film. The 1987 Hong Kong film Angel has also been credited with establishing the genre. More films of the subgenre were produced until 1994, featuring the likes of Yukari Oshima, Moon Lee, Cynthia Khan and Sharon Yeung.

In the early 2000s, a "girls with guns revival" occurred and more films of the genre were produced. These include Hong Kong films like Martial Angels (2001), The Wesley's Mysterious File (2002), and So Close (2002). The 2002 Japanese film Gun Crazy: A Woman from Nowhere and its sequel episode Gun Crazy 2: Beyond the Law are also of this genre. American films of the revival include Lara Croft: Tomb Raider (2001), Quentin Tarantino's Kill Bill: Volume 1 (2003) and Kill Bill: Volume 2 (2004), and D.E.B.S. (2004).

== In animation ==
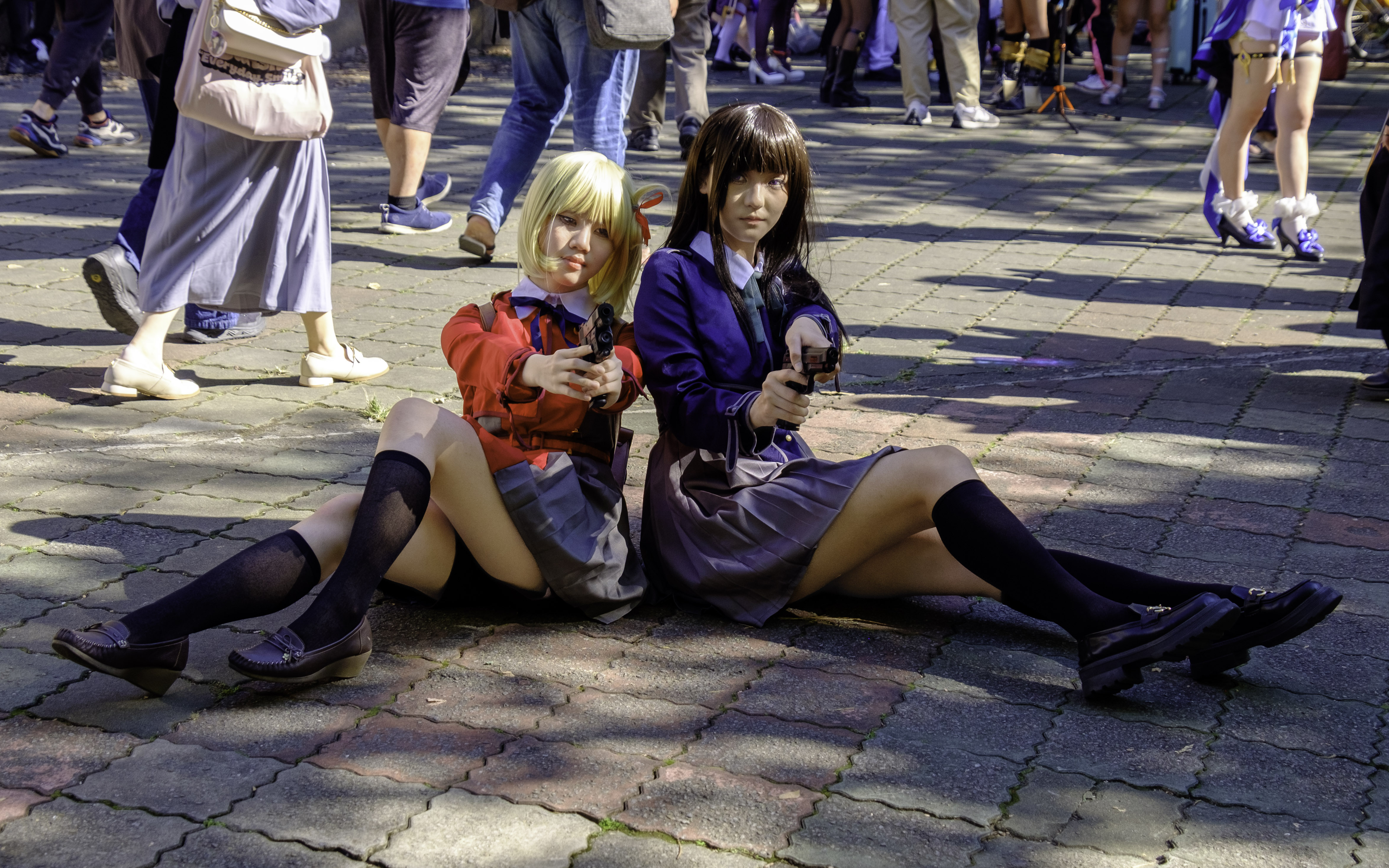
Cosplayers as Chisato Nishikigi and Takina Inoue from the anime Lycoris Recoil

The subgenre has also permeated the anime space. Some examples include Akiba Maid War, Aria the Scarlet Ammo, Black Lagoon, Blue Archive, Bubblegum Crisis, Dirty Pair, Girls' Frontline, Gunsmith Cats, Gunslinger Girl, Lycoris Recoil, Noir, Madlax, El Cazador, Ghost in the Shell and Ghost in the Shell: Stand Alone Complex as well as Yasuomi Umetsu's works Kite, Mezzo Forte, Mezzo DSA, Kite: Liberator, and Virgin Punk. Chrono Crusade has a "nun with a gun" as its protagonist.

== See also ==
- Feminist film theory
- Femme fatale
- List of female action heroes and villains
- Nunsploitation
