= Tony Randel =

American film director and screenwriter (born 1956)

Anthony "Tony" Randel (born May 29, 1956) is a Portuguese/American film director and screenwriter.

== Early life ==
Randel grew up in West Los Angeles and attended University High School. He went on to study at Santa Monica College before transferring to California State University, Northridge, where he majored in film production. During his high school and college years, Randel worked as a grocery clerk at Lucky Market, with locations in both the Palms and Brentwood neighborhoods of Los Angeles.

== Film career ==
Randel began his career working in the mailroom for B movie icon Roger Corman. Within a few weeks, he transitioned into editorial work on Battle Beyond the Stars—a film more famous for the careers it launched than for the film itself.

In 1985, Randel (credited as Anthony Randel) produced the New World Pictures rework of the Japanese The Return of Godzilla into the English film Godzilla 1985. Randel's breakthrough into directing came when Randel, who had supervised the production of Clive Barker's Hellraiser, was hired by New World's President of Production, Steve White, to direct the sequel Hellbound: Hellraiser II. It received mixed reviews, but was a financial success. Randel also directed the live-action film adaptation of the manga Fist of the North Star. The film premiered on HBO and was released to video. He also directed one of Fangoria's low-budget films, Children of the Night (1991), which one critic described as obviously low budget, but with striking scenes.

== Personal life ==
Randel is married and has three children. In addition to his film career, he has stated his "other love" is radio. He has been a licensed amateur radio operator since 1968.

== Filmography ==
Year	Title	Director	Writer	Producer	Notes
1985	Def-Con 4	Yes	No	No	Uncredited
1985	Godzilla 1985	No	Yes	Yes	U.S. Version, Uncredited
1985	Grunt! The Wrestling Movie	No	Yes	Yes	credited as Anthony Randel
1988	Hellbound: Hellraiser II	Yes	No	No	
1991	Inside Out	Yes	Yes	No	segments: "Brush Strokes" & "The Leda"
1991	Children of the Night	Yes	Yes	No	
1992	Inside Out 2	Yes	Yes	No	segment: "The Freak"
1992	Amityville 1992: It's About Time	Yes	No	No	
1992	Hellraiser III: Hell on Earth	No	Yes	No	Story by
1993	Ticks	Yes	No	No	
1995	Fist of the North Star	Yes	Yes	No	
1996	One Good Turn	Yes	No	No	
1996	Rattled	Yes	No	No	TV movie
1998	Assignment Berlin	Yes	No	No	
2006	Sleeping Dogs Lie	No	No	Yes	
2008	The Double Born	Yes	Yes	No	
2015	Hybrids	Yes	No	Yes	
2016	A Doggone Christmas	No	No	Yes	
2017	A Doggone Hollywood	No	No	Yes	
2018	A Doggone Adventure	Yes	No	Yes	
