= List of The Young and the Restless characters introduced in 2025 =

The Young and the Restless is an American CBS soap opera which debuted on March 26, 1973. This is a list of its characters that debuted in 2025, in order of first appearance. Damian Kane (Nathan Owens), the older long-lost half-brother of Nate Hastings (Sean Dominic), made his first appearance on January 8. Assistant Carter (Vincent Stalba) and event planner Pietro (Jai Rodriguez) debuted in May. Matt Cohen began appearing as Detective Burrow in October and Annie Stewart (Catherine Kresge) debuted the following month.

== Holden Novak ==
Holden Novak
- The Young and the Restless character
- Portrayed by: Nathan Owens
- Duration: 2025–present
- First appearance: January 8, 2025
- Introduced by: Josh Griffith
In-universe information
- Parents: Malcolm Winters; Stephanie Simmons
- Siblings: Lily Winters (half); Nathan Hastings, Jr. (adoptive)

Holden Novak, played by Nathan Owens, made his first appearance on January 8. Owens' casting was announced on December 12, 2024. Owens' role in a "mysterious" new role was initially kept secret, with The Young and the Restless promising that the arrival of Owens' character would create "plenty of excitement and intrigue" for other characters. Following the announcement of his casting, Owens wrote on Instagram that he was excited to join the cast and encouraged viewers to "Tune in if you're up for the twist and turns". Owens had previously portrayed Cameron Davis on another soap opera, Days of Our Lives, and believed that he now had more experience and was hence better prepared to work in a soap opera again. Owens did not reveal who he would be playing but teased that he would be a "a very mysterious guy" who "plays a very delicate role in this scenario". The actor further revealed that his character "holds his cards close to the vest and he keeps things tight. I like diving into the mysterious world my character has. I very much enjoy this character and the depth that he can bring to the show". Owens had previously worked with his co-start Eileen Davidson (Ashley Abbott) on Days of Our Lives and was looking forward to seeing her on set again. Owens had also previously worked with Melissa Ordway, who portrays Ashley's daughter Abby Newman. Owens felt welcomed by the cast and crew when he joined the soap opera and believed that everyone was kind, inviting and warm, and commented on how one of the makeup artists walked him to where he needed to go when he arrived on set. Owens added, "That's what really stood out to me, the warmth from everybody. The folks that I got to work with on day one were amazing".

Owens' role was eventually revealed to be Damian Kane, the secret son of established characters Amy Lewis (Valarie Pettiford) and Nathan Hastings, and the older long-lost half-brother of Nathan Hastings, Jr. (Sean Dominic). The character had been reference onscreen multiple times since Amy had returned to the soap in 2024. Prior to the reveal, there had been "high speculation" from critics and fans that Owens would be portraying Damian. In the storyline, Amy reveals to Nate that she gave birth to Nathan's child after an affair with him, but she had never told Nathan that she was pregnant and Damian grew up believing that Amy's new husband was his father, and he struggled with his death. Nate is shocked by Amy's revelations and Amy reveals that she is dying of leukaemia, which Damian does not know about, and she asks Nate to help track him down as she does not know his whereabouts as he went into a "tailspin" after the death of her husband. Amy also asks Nate to mentor and look after Damian when she dies. Damian and Nate eventually meet in Los Angeles. Owens praised Dominic for being welcoming on his first day. On February 3, 2025, the character is revealed to be an imposter, posing as the real Damian (Jermaine Rivers). In 2026, it is revealed that Holden is Malcolm Winters' son with his ex-girlfriend, Stephanie Simmons.

Prior to the character's debut, Sloane Stephanie from TV Insider called the role "enigmatic". Candace Young from Soaps She Knows predicted that Nate and Damian's relationship would be similar to that of previous characters Neil Winters (Kristoff St. John) and his half-brother Malcolm (Shemar Moore), with Young calling Damian the "new Malcolm". She characterized Damian as the "troubled sibling and a wanderer with no known address" who had not made an effort to stay in touch with his family. Her colleagues, Amy Mistretta and Richard Simms, called the reveal of Amy and Nathan's secret child a "shocking development" and had previously speculated that Owens' role would be Damian. They also called Damian a "sexy newcomer" and questioned which character would catch his eye. Terrell Smith from What to Watch had speculated prior to the character's debut that Amy was contacting Nate to ask for an organ donation for her son.

== Carter ==
Carter, played by Vincent Stalba, made his first appearance on May 14, 2025, with it being reported that he would appear on a recurring status. He was introduced as the assistant of Aristotle Dumas (Billy Flynn). Stalba found his audition for the soap "super quick and easy" and his audition piece was the scene where Carter tries to prevent Phyllis Summers (Michelle Stafford) from reaching Aristotle. The character was originally meant to appear in one episode but Stalba was later brought back to reprise the role a few weeks later. Stalba enjoyed his character's arc on the soap and revealed that he found it fun to boss around the established characters of the soap through his role, explaining, "The first time I walked on the maze set, Joshua Morrow]] [ Nick] ] said, 'Oh my God, he's perfect.' So that was my first introduction, and I felt immediately at home. I was able to breathe and have fun because yeah, I'm talking to these legacy actors and characters and I'm telling them what to do and not giving them any answers and leaving them in a very uncomfortable position. So I think it was fun for them just as much as it was fun for me". Stalba also found the fast pace of working in the soap "remarkable" and explained that Flynn was kind to him and helped him with the process. Stalba called Carter "calculated, cold, polished, professional, and very robotic", and teased that the character would do "anything" for his boss and that he may have his own plans too; he added, "Things are about to get very juicy and very exciting, and I think people are going to connect with Carter in a new way". The actor added, "I got the scripts for some of the other upcoming episodes and learned how the other characters talk about [Carter], I kind of just utilize all of their feedback and embrace that for my character and role".

== Pietro ==
Pietro, played by Jai Rodriguez, debuted on May 28, 2025. He was introduced as a "vivacious and opinionated" event planner who comes to help plan a "lavish" birthday celebration for Nikki Newman (Melody Thomas Scott) and his initial stint lasted for four episodes. He then returned on November 13 of the same year to help plan the wedding of Danny Romalotti (Michael Damian) and Christine Blair (Lauralee Bell). Rodriguez had previously appeared in several other soap operas before debuting on The Young and the Restless.

Regarding his initial stint, Rodriguez explained that Pietro's ideas are slightly "unorthodox", which creates comedy, adding, "I was crying laughing, it's hilarious. I kept watching and I was like, 'This too good. I can't believe they let me do this on a soap.'" The actor also explained that Pietro has been "enthralled" with Nikki for years, adding, "He sees her as this pinnacle of glamour and resilience and this trailblazing business mogul". The actor also teased that Pietro would not make the best impression when he meets her, calling him a "poor guy" who tries to be professional.

== Detective Burrow ==
Detective Burrow, played by Matt Cohen, made his first appearance on October 16, 2025. The character and casting were announced on September 5 of the same year and he had begun filming the previous week. Cohen had previously appeared in another American soap opera, General Hospital, and he was one of several cast members from that soap to join The Young and the Restless in the latter half of 2025, in addition to Tamara Braun and Roger Howarth. It was reported that Detective Burrow would be involved in an investigation involving many of the "key players" of The Young and the Restless.

== Annie Stewart ==
Annie Stewart, played by Catherine Kresge, made her first appearance on November 20, 2025. The character and casting were announced on October 29, 2025. She is a detective that will investigate Noah Newman's (Lucas Adams) car crash, as part of a storyline that the soap's executive producer Josh Griffith teased would be a big mystery involving multiple characters.

In December 2025, Mara Levinsky from Soap Opera Digest called Annie a "shady cop" and commented that it was not new that she was "up to no good".
