= DoubleTree by Hilton Davenport =

Post 90's gentrified historic hotel

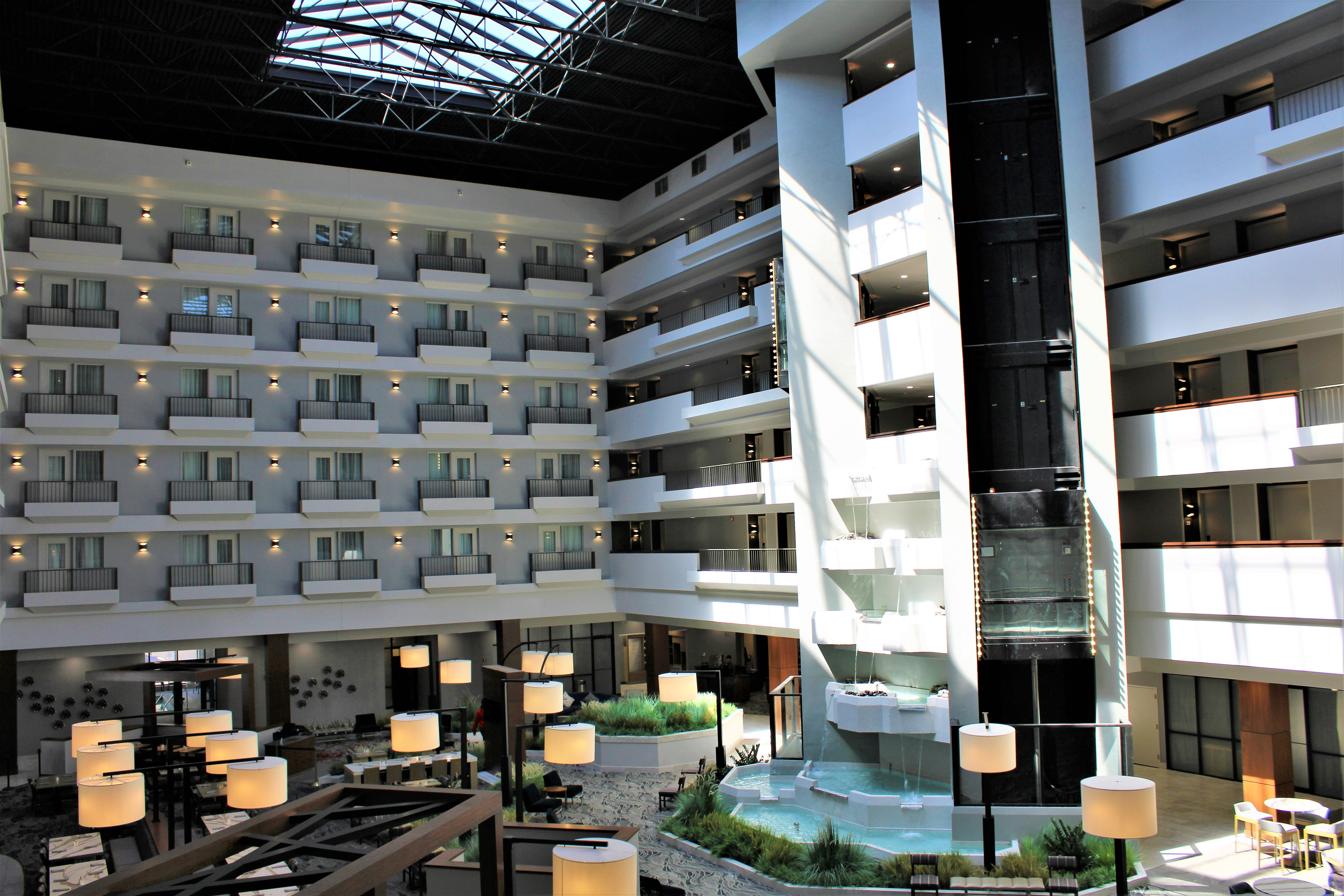
- Former names: Quad City Plaza Hotel, Radisson Quad City Plaza
- Hotel chain: DoubleTree by Hilton

General information
- Status: Operating
- Type: Hotel
- Architectural style: Postmodern
- Location: 111 East 2nd Street, Davenport, Iowa, USA
- Coordinates: 41.5209°N 90.5734°W
- Opened: October 6, 1995
- Cost: 19 million (1992 USD)
- Owner: Hawkeye Hotels
- Operator: First Hospitality

Height
- Top floor: 6

Technical details
- Floor count: 6
- Lifts/elevators: 2

Design and construction
- Architecture firm: John Q. Hammons Hotels

Other information
- Number of rooms: 223
- Number of restaurants: 1
- Number of bars: 1
- Parking: Onsite or Connected via skybridge

The DoubleTree by Hilton Davenport, formerly Radisson Quad City Plaza, is a 223-room hotel and convention center located at 111 E. 2nd Street in Davenport, Iowa. It features an open atrium lobby, waterfall lounge, indoor pool, fitness center, bar and in-house restaurant.

== History ==
Design proposals were submitted in 1992 for a new hotel expansion to be connected to the Davenport RiverCenter and supplement the over-capacity Hotel Blackhawk. John Q. Hammons Hotels LLC received approval for a new atrium-style hotel to have its own event space in addition to the RiverCenter existing space connected via skywalk. Initially, Hammons Hotels LLC had a stake of over 80% into the project, with Iowa-Illinois Gas and Electric Co. (now MidAmerican Energy) and Lee Enterprises as limited partners. Originally under the name of Quad City Plaza Hotel, it was joined with Radisson Hospitality Worldwide to become Radisson Quad City Plaza in 1995. Unusual for the time, promotional CD's we created by Hammons Hotels LLC and distributed to local markets without any sales pitch, just ambiance sounds of a waterfall and light lounge music.

At 7 PM, October 6, 1995, the Radisson Quad City Plaza opened with a ribbon cutting by then-current mayor of Davenport Pat Gibbs. The hotel had a complement of sauna/spa facility, gymnasium, pool, whirlpool, floral shop, restaurant and bar upon opening. The Radisson welcomed numerous celebrities within its first year including King Carl and Queen Sylvia of Sweden, William Shatner, Richard Simmons, and Tiger Woods. In addition to being connected to the RiverCenter complex, a riverboat casino by the name of 'President' was docked nearby and provided entertainment for guests for years. Originally a non-smoking property, the policy was rescinded in October 1996 for the in-house restaurant, Bistro on Brady, as guests consistently requested to partake. John Q. Hammons Hotels LLC decided to buy out its partners for the hotel in 1997. As part of a refresh for the new millennium, Bistro on Brady became Brady Street Chophouse and reinforced a non-smoking policy.

Danny Holmes, the General Manager of the hotel since opening, led a collective effort of all lodging properties of the Quad Cities called the Hotel and Motel Association of the Quad Cities to encourage tourism to the metropolis. The Radisson Quad City Plaza was nominated for the President's Award by Radisson Hotels in 2007 for the most top performing hotel among the chain's franchisees. Another honor, being noted in Hospitality Magazine as the top hotel out of 250 recognized the same year. The hotel's adjoining skybridge was prominently featured in the made-for-TV movie Megafault trailer.

As time went on, the hotel experienced a high level of staff turnover which caused a lack of service in all departments. John Q. Hammons Hotels LLC sold the property to Atrium Hospitality. One memorable change was the restaurant became Cafe 111 (Cafe One Eleven). After a brief tenure, the property was sold to Hawkeye Hotels. By 2017, the mid-1990's decor and amenities were outdated and worn. With the rise of the COVID-19 pandemic, Hawkeye Hotels decided to use the low occupancy for a complete overhaul to transform the hotel into a DoubleTree by Hilton.
