= Mamak Khadem =

Iranian-American musician

Mamak Khadem (Persian: مامک خادم) is an Iranian-American world trance music singer.

Called by Sandra Hughes "a nomad who uses her art to bridge cultural traditions", Khadem is one of the few women singers in world trance music, a discipline normally dominated by men. She was the lead singer for the band Axiom of Choice, has sung for various soundtracks, and currently works as a solo artist.

== Personal life ==
Khadem was born in Tehran, Iran in 1961. She immigrated to the United States in 1977. While Khadem's music is based in the classical Persian style, she is open to utilizes diverse cultural influences. She is a former member of the cross-cultural fusion ensemble AXIOM OF CHOICE.

== Education ==
Khadem received her master's degree in Applied Mathematics from California State University, Long Beach.

== Career ==
While studying to receive her master's degree, Khadem took on her first teaching job. She would go on to teach mathematics full-time from 1985 to 2003, primarily at the Westmark School in Encino, Los Angeles, California. As an educator, she worked with students ranging in age from second grade to college, both in class settings and as a private tutor. She put particular emphasis on educating children with learning disabilities such as dyslexia. Khadem has characterized her career as a mathematics teacher as "one of the most challenging things I [have] experienced ... I often had to become a jokester or act funny to get the attention of my students." She found that music, too, was able to help her connect with her students. She often attended students' gigs in order to form stronger, closer bonds with them.

It was while Khadem was teaching that she and the other founding members formed Axiom of Choice. The first Iranian fusion band to form abroad, Axiom of Choice opened the way for subsequent musicians working in the style to play for the global audience.

Khadem spent her final years as a mathematics teacher at Santa Monica College and West Los Angeles College. During this time, she found herself increasingly disillusioned with the education system, feeling there might be a better way to make a difference in kids' lives. In 2003, Khadem left her job as a mathematics teacher and has since happily poured her energy into music.

Khadem has been passionate about music since her youth, when she was part of the Children's Choir for National Radio and Television of Iran. After the Iranian Revolution, she began taking every opportunity to improve her skill as a vocal artist. She regularly returned to Iran to learn from Persian vocalists and masters.

Khadem has been called "one of the wonders of world trance music" by the Los Angeles Times. Given her predilection for connecting people and cultures, she has wandered both geographically and musically: while her art is founded on Persian traditional music, she's found inspiration globally. A nomad, Khadem has gathered musical influences and knowledge from many sources, from Indian classical music studied at Ali Akbar Khan College to the Balkan musical leanings of the women's choir Nevenka.

== Social activism ==
Khadem has been an active member of many communities fomenting equal rights. Of particular importance are groups supporting women's equality, children and education, immigrant justice, and gun control; and groups opposing political imprisonment, politically-motivated executions, and animal cruelty. She has worked with March for Our Lives, joining the victims and families of school shootings to oppose gun violence. With organizations like the Iranian American Women's Foundation and FeminEast, Khadem has striven to build community and address the needs of Iranian American/Iranian expatriate women.

Khadem has spoken out on political topics, as well. Being devoted to connection, and invoking the historical precedent of the Iranian Revolution, Khadem opposes political entities that seek to divide peoples and cultures. Khadem and other musicians spoke out upon the announcement of the Trump travel ban:

"It reminded me of how the Iranian students were treated here in the U.S. during the hostage crisis of 1979," Khadem said. "Many students were insulted, deported, battered, and threatened. It took many years to forget and forgive those days and finally call myself an Iranian-American." Khadem has contributed to the advancement of music on a global scale, having taught classes and workshops in the U.S., Canada, Greece and Ireland. Not surprisingly, she believes musicians play a crucial role in the world of politics. "Music offers a language that is close to people's hearts rather than their brain," she said. "Music offers tools to break boundaries that politics has forced on us."

== Volunteer work ==
Khadem is a volunteer dog walker with the Lange Foundation, dedicated to animal rescue, care, and placement.

Khadem is a member of Amurtel Greece for Refugee Mothers and Babies, an organization which cares for mothers and babies in the greater Athens area.

Khadem is a volunteer teacher with Flying Carpet Festival, a group dedicated to the musical and creative growth of children in and around Mardin, Turkey.

== Discography ==
=== Axiom of Choice ===
- Beyond Denial (Faray-e Enkaar) (1996)
- Niya Yesh (2000)
- Unfolding (Goshayesh) (2002)

=== Solo ===
- Jostojoo: Forever Seeking (2007)
- A Window to Color (2011)
- The Road (2015)
- Remembrance (2022)

== Filmography ==
- The Chosen One (1995) - Musician
- Battlestar Galactica (miniseries) (2003) - Singer
- Plastic Flowers Never Die (2008) - Composer
- Peacemaker
