= Jack Armstrong (wrestler) =

American professional wrestler (1947–2026)

Personal information
- Born: Leonard Ornstein; June 28, 1947 Los Angeles, California, U.S.
- Died: October 25, 2026 (aged 79)

Professional wrestling career
- Ring name(s): Jack Armstrong; Black Jack; Super Scorpion; Ali Ben Khan; Lenny Solomon; Red Rhodes; Sailor Jack
- Billed height: 6 ft 0 in (183 cm)
- Billed weight: 231 lb (105 kg)
- Debut: 1963
- Retired: 1994

Leonard Ornstein (June 28, 1947 – October 25, 2026) was an American actor and professional wrestler, best known under the ring name "Wildman" Jack Armstrong from the 1960s to the early 1990s. He was best known for working for Herb Abrams's Universal Wrestling Federation and World Wide Wrestling Federation. His feud with Chief Jay Strongbow in the mid-1980s resulted in "some of the bloodiest encounters ever seen in California".

== Background ==
Leonard Ornstein was born in Los Angeles, California, on June 28, 1947. He died on October 25, 2026, at the age of 79.

== Professional wrestling career ==
Armstrong made his professional wrestling debut in 1963.

In 1968, he made his debut for the WWWF (World Wide Wrestling Federation) in New York City as Lenny Solomon. He feuded with The Sicilians Lou Albano and Tony Altomare. In 1969, he left the WWWF.

Throughout the majority of his career he worked in Japan, AWA, Los Angeles, Georgia, and various territories during the 1970s. From 1983 to 1988, Armstrong worked for the WWF as a preliminary wrestler. He only worked in Los Angeles when the WWF came to town. Armstrong appeared in three films - Grunt! The Wrestling Movie (1985), Bad Guys (1986) and Body Slam (1986) - during this period.

In 1990, Armstrong worked for the brand new promotion Universal Wrestling Federation (UWF).

He became the first and only UWF Junior Heavyweight champion by defeating Mando Guerrero at the final UWF show in 1994.

== Filmography ==
Film appearances
Year	Title	Role	Notes	Ref.
1987	The Wrestler	Himself		
1984	Micki & Maude	Jack "Wildman" Armstrong		
1985	Grunt! The Wrestling Movie	Battle Royale Wrestler	Credited as The Wild Man	
1986	Bad Guys	Sod Buster		
1986	Body Slam	Jack "Wildman" Armstrong	Uncredited	
1991	Alligator II: The Mutation	Mundo the Wildman		
1991	Zombie Army			
2000	The Boys Behind the Desk			
2010	Changing Hands	Jack		

Television appearances
Year	Title	Role	Notes	Ref.
1986	Misfits of Science	Bates Motel	Episode: "The Avenging Angel"	
1987	Matlock	"Sailor" Jack Saunders	Episode: "The Annihilator"	
1988	Tales from the Darkside	Lockjaw Lukasig	Episode: "Basher Malone"	
2009	Human Wrecking Balls	Himself	Episode: "Chopper Crunch"	

== Championships and accomplishments ==
- All-California Championship Wrestling
  - ACCW Heavyweight Championship (1 time)
- California Pro Wrestling
  - CPW Heavyweight Championship (1 time)
  - CPW American International Championship (3 times)
  - CPW California Championship (1 time)
  - CPW Brass Knucks Championship (3 times)
- International Wrestling Federation
  - IWF Heavyweight Championship (1 time)
  - IWF Tag Team Championship (1 time) – with Josh Ben-Gurion
- Universal Wrestling Federation (Herb Abrams)
  - UWF Junior Heavyweight Championship (1 time)
