= Lauren Walsh =

Lauren Walsh may refer to:

- Lauren Walsh (actress)
- Lauren Walsh (golfer)
