= Groomer Has It =

American reality game television series

- Created by: Peter Ney
- Starring: Jai Rodriguez
- Country of origin: United States
- No. of seasons: 2
- No. of episodes: 25

Production
- Running time: 45 minutes

Original release
- Network: Animal Planet
- Release: April 12, 2008 – June 27, 2009

Groomer Has It is an American reality television broadcast on Animal Planet. It features a competition between twelve of America's best dog groomers to see who is the best groomer in America. The prize includes $50,000 and a "mobile grooming salon." The show is hosted by Jai Rodriguez of Queer Eye for the Straight Guy fame. The winner of the first season was Artist Knox, while the second groomer of the year is Huber Pineda.

== Show format ==
Twelve dog groomers enter the competition in to the Dog House, where they must live and compete together. Every week there is a Quick Sniff Challenge, which involves the groomers doing a miscellaneous task which could be helpful to their grooming career. The winner of this challenge gets a Leg Up in the Elimination Challenge, a grooming challenge often related to the Quick Sniff Challenge. The winner of the Elimination Challenge gets a Leg Up for the next Quick Sniff Challenge (in season 1), and a groomer who performed below the standard for the competition is eliminated from the game.

== Personnel ==
- Host Jai Rodriguez, TV personality/Queer Eye for the Straight Guy
- Nemo the Messenger Dog, Jai's Yorkie
- Judge Dr. Karen Halligan, veterinarian
- Judge Xavier Santiago, award-winning dog handler
- Judge Joey Villani, professional dog groomer

== Season 1 ==
=== Episodes ===
- Ep. 1 First Things First (originally aired April 12, 2008)
- Ep. 2 Herd Mentality (originally aired April 19, 2008)
- Ep. 3 Ruff Customers (originally aired April 26, 2008)
- Ep. 4 The Fashion Show (originally aired May 3, 2008)
- Ep. 5 Meowza (originally aired May 10, 2008)
- Ep. 6 Chow Time (originally aired May 17, 2008)
- Ep. 7 On the Cover (originally aired May 24, 2008)
- Ep. 8 Knowing Your Dog (originally aired May 31, 2008)
- Ep. 9 Rags to Riches (originally aired June 7, 2008)
- Ep. 10 House Calls (originally aired June 14, 2008)
- Ep. 11 Down to Business (originally aired June 21, 2008)
- Ep. 12 Recap Episode (originally aired June 28, 2008)
- Ep. 13 The Championship Dog Show (originally aired June 28, 2008)

=== Groomer progress ===
	1	2	3	4	5	6	7 ^{2}	8	9 ^{3} ^{4}	10	11	13 ^{5} ^{6}
Artist Knox	IN	IN	IN	HIGH	LOW	WIN	IN	LOW	SAFE	LOW	WIN	WINNER
Jonathan David	WIN	WIN	HIGH	IN	IN	IN	HIGH	HIGH	IN	WIN	LOW	OUT
Jorge Bendersky	HIGH	IN	IN	HIGH	IN	IN	LOW	LOW	WIN	HIGH	OUT	
Kathleen Sepulveda	IN	IN	IN	IN	WIN	LOW	WIN	WIN	IN	OUT		
Jasper Asaro	LOW	HIGH	IN	WIN	IN	HIGH	IN	OUT				
Jessica Farrell	IN	IN	IN	LOW	IN	IN	OUT					
Will Comparsi	IN	LOW	WIN	LOW	HIGH	OUT						
Malissa Koven	IN	IN	LOW	IN	OUT							
Amber Lewin	IN	IN	IN	OUT ^{1}								
Jon Bannon	IN	IN	OUT									
Sarah Eudenbach	IN	OUT										
Lisa Allen	OUT											

(WINNER) The groomer won the series and was crowned Groomer of the Year.
(WIN) The groomer won that episode's Elimination Challenge.
(HIGH) The groomer was selected as one of the top entries in the Elimination Challenge, but did not win.
(LOW) The groomer was selected as one of the bottom entries in the Elimination Challenge, but was not eliminated.
(OUT) The groomer lost that week's Elimination Challenge and was out of the competition.
(IN) The groomer neither won or lost that week's Elimination Challenge. They also were not up to be eliminated.
(SAFE) The groomer could have been eliminated but there were unusual circumstances.

- ^1In episode 4 groomers worked in teams of 3. The bottom 3 groomers voted off their own teammate, and the judges would only choose who left if there was a tie.
- ^2In episode 7 there was no Quick Sniff Challenge. Instead, the groomers had an Elimination Challenge where they had to choose a dog from the dog park, groom it, and then have a photo shoot for Groomer to Groomer Magazine.
- ^3In episode 9 there was no Quick Sniff Challenge. Instead, the groomers had to groom dogs from The Lange Foundation dog shelter and adopt them out.
- ^4Originally, the elimination challenge was to select one dog out of four from The Lange Foundation's Los Angeles dog shelter and adopt it out. The one that was last in finding a home for their dog would be sent home. After the adoption fair was over it was revealed that no one would be going home.
- ^5Episode 12 was a recap episode, showing never before seen clips and catching up anyone who hadn't seen the season.
- ^6In Episode 13 there was no Quick Sniff Challenge. Instead, the groomers had to groom 8 dogs in less than 12 hours, 7 from each regular show group and one "mutt" to showcase their creative ability.

== Season 2 ==
=== Episodes ===
- Ep. 1 Welcome to the Neighborhood (originally aired April 11, 2009)
- Ep. 2 What's Wrong With This Picture (originally aired April 18, 2009)
- Ep. 3 Deep Breaths (originally aired April 25, 2009)
- Ep. 4 The Cutting Edge (originally aired May 2, 2009)
- Ep. 5 Top Knots (originally aired May 10, 2009)
- Ep. 6 Old Dog, New Tricks (originally aired May 17, 2009)
- Ep. 7 Piggies (originally aired May 24, 2009)
- Ep. 8 Rescue Me (originally aired May 30, 2009)
- Ep. 9 Look-a-Likes (originally aired June 6, 2009)
- Ep. 10 Green on the Go (originally aired June 13, 2009)
- Ep. 11 Cut! (originally aired June 20, 2009)
- Ep. 12 Groomers Unleashed (June 27, 2009)
- Ep. 13 Finale (originally aired June 27, 2009)

=== Groomer progress ===
	1	2	3	4	5	6	7	8	9	10	11	13
Huber	WIN	IN	IN	IN	WIN	WIN	IN	SAFE ^{2}	IN ^{3}	WIN	IN	WINNER
Lisa	WIN	IN	WIN	IN	WIN	IN	WIN	WIN	HIGH	WIN	WIN	OUT
Danielle	IN	IN	IN	WIN	WIN	HIGH	IN	HIGH	SAFE ^{3}	LOW	OUT	
William "Bill"	IN	IN	WIN	LOW	WIN	SAFE ^{1}	HIGH	LOW	WIN	OUT		
Cassandra	IN	WIN	IN	IN	LOW	LOW	LOW	IN	OUT			
Marco	IN	IN	IN	IN	LOW	IN	OUT					
Vanessa	WIN	IN	IN	HIGH	LOW	OUT						
Jessica	LOW	HIGH	LOW	IN	OUT							
Krista	LOW	LOW	IN	OUT								
Sherri	IN	IN	OUT									
"Chicken" Joe	IN	OUT										
Michael	OUT											

(WINNER) The groomer won the series and was crowned Groomer of the Year.
(WIN) The groomer won that episode's Elimination Challenge.
(HIGH) The groomer was selected as one of the top entries in the Elimination Challenge, but did not win.
(LOW) The groomer was selected as one of the bottom entries in the Elimination Challenge, but was not eliminated.
(OUT) The groomer lost that week's Elimination Challenge and was out of the competition.
(IN) The groomer neither won or lost that week's Elimination Challenge. They also were not up to be eliminated.
(SAFE) The groomer may have been eliminated except there were unusual circumstances.

- ^1 The judges said that if Bill did not have immunity (which he won from the Quick Sniff Challenge) he would have been eliminated.
- ^2 Bill was called before Huber, who then thought he was going home. It was then revealed that he was being "rescued" by the judges liked they had rescued the dogs at the animal shelter by helping them find new homes.
- ^3 Danielle was originally in the bottom two, but Lisa used her save and switched Danielle with Huber.

=== Challenges ===
Episode	Quick Sniff Challenge	Leg Up	Elimination Challenge
"Welcome to the Neighborhood"	The groomers were separated into four teams of three. Each team had 30 minutes to find household items to groom their St. Bernard by asking people in the neighborhood. They then had one hour to groom the dog.	The winning team was treated to a gourmet dinner while the other teams had leftovers from a doggie bag. The winning team also got 10 minutes to consult with the designer of the groom in the Elimination Challenge.	The teams (the same as the Quick Sniff Challenge) assigned each member an attribute (either cleanliness, cut, or creativity). They then had to style a standard poodle in a unique way.
"What's Wrong With This Picture"	The groomers used the same teams as "Welcome to the Neighborhood" (which resulted in a disadvantage for Jessica and Krista, as Micheal was eliminated) to identify safety hazards in a common grooming salon.	The winning team first got to go indoor skydiving. In the Elimination Challenge, they had the advantage of choosing the dogs they would groom and distributing the other dogs to their competitors.	Each groomer got a different type of dog, some being mixed-breed. The cuts were done to make the dogs more sanitary, especially as some dogs even had complications which prevented certain handling on them.
"Deep Breaths"	Massage a dog to the greatest point of relaxation, using techniques such as aromatherapy and essential oils. Groomers separated themselves in teams of two before they knew the challenge.	The two winners were able to go to a high quality spa for a day. They also received 3 minutes to consult with their clients midway through the groom to review progress and check customer satisfaction.	Each grooming team, the same as the Quick Sniff Challenge, had perfectionist clients that were able to secretly view the groomers during the challenge to see if their unique requests were met.
"The Cutting Edge"	In teams of three determined by the groomers before the challenge, the task was to design, create, and pitch a new invention that would be useful to solve everyday problems for an in-home groomer.	The winning team got the reward to be in a photo shoot with Groomer to Groomer, a leading dog-grooming magazine. They were also allowed a five-minute consultation with an experienced vacuum clipper groomer.	Individually each groomer must use a vacuum clipper to style a poodle mix. A vacuum clipper is an uncommon grooming tool that uses the suction of a vacuum as one of the main sources for canine hair removal.
"Tying the Knot"	In teams of four, the groomers had to make top knots judged by the last winner, Artist Knox.	The leader of the team got to switch anyone from either teams to the other.	In teams of four, they had to groom the bride and groom of the first Groomer Has It wedding.
"Old Dog, New Tricks"	The groomers are sent back to school, where they learn that they have to teach a group of children in fifth grade the basics of grooming.	The winner was given immunity.	The groomers must take a set of senior dogs and trim years off their appearance.
"Piggies"	The groomers take their carefully culled canine clipping skills and use them to make over some filthy pot-bellied pigs.	The winners got to take a training session in kickboxing. They also got to take away 15 minutes from a competitor of their choosing in the Elimination Challenge.	The contestants deal with another heavyweight challenge – slimming down some overweight dogs using the techniques of anatomy grooming.
"Rescue Me"	The groomers travel to a local animal shelter, where they lovingly transform a group of homeless dogs and present them in a special adoption fair.	The winner received a visit from his best friend. The winner was also transported by vehicle to the salon, as all the others groomers had to walk.	The groomers race to groom search and rescue dogs under the toughest conditions yet – no soap and no water.
"Look-alikes"	The groomers take some Basset Hounds under their wing in an obedience training course. They then had to tell which was their dog in a mass of similar-looking canines.	The winner got a makeover and was able to save one person from the bottom two, who would be swapped with someone else.	The groomers are seeing double in their elimination challenge as they style dogs to look like their owners.
"Green on the Go"	Grooming goes green as the contestants use electric clippers to shave down dogs - but only with the power from electricity-generating bikes.	The winning team's leg-up was that they received a packet back at the Dog House with pictures of their "clients" for the grooming challenge.	The groomers take the show on the road, traveling to clients in state-of-the-art hybrid mobile grooming vans.
"Cut!"	The groomers get their biggest taste of fame yet as they create grooming instruction videos.	There was no leg up.	The groomers face the toughest challenge yet: scissoring a set of show-quality Bichon Frisés to American Kennel Club breed standards.
"Finale"	The groomers are tested in traditional elements of a show-dog competition after being taught by Xavier.	The winner got to choose who got what dogs to groom in the finale.	The groomers styled three rare dog breeds that were judged without the groomers revealing their dogs until the end.
