= Charles Noland =

American actor

Charles Noland is an American actor who has appeared in many TV shows and films, including Blow and Wayne's World. He was a supporting character on ER for 2 seasons and on The West Wing for 7 seasons.

Noland has also had a long stage career, both as an actor and as a director, having worked with the Oregon Shakespeare Festival, ACT Theatre, the Kern Shakespeare Festival, the Fort Worth Shakespeare Festival, and Incline, The Theatre Group.

Noland studied drama at the University of California, Davis and the University of California, Santa Cruz.

== Filmography ==
=== Film ===
Year	Title	Role	Notes
1987	Surrender	Thug	
1988	Sunset	Jail Inmates	
1989	Three Fugitives	Bartender	
1991	Rock 'n' Roll High School Forever	Roy	
1991	Servants of Twilight	Plummer	
1992	Wayne's World	Ron Paxton	
1994	The Little Rascals	Amish Man	
1996	Up Close & Personal	Focus Group Member	
1998	Desperate Measures	Cigarette Guard	
1998	Break Up	Neighbor	
2001	Blow	Jack Stevens	
2001	Bubble Boy	Perris Townie	
2002	Simone	Detective	
2003	Old School	Beav	
2005	Dirty Deeds	Blind Man	
2008	The Double Born	Mr. Stanton	Also executive producer
2012	Model Minority	Guard 3	
2015	Hybrids	Professor Prater	
2018	A Doggone Adventure	Anti-crab Gate Guard	

=== Television ===
Year	Title	Role	Notes
1982	Seven Brides for Seven Brothers	Gargan	Episode: "Heritage"
1986	Highway to Heaven	Ice Cream Man	Episode: "The Last Assignment"
1987	U.S. Marshals: Waco & Rhinehart	Bishopson	Television film
1988	Cheers	Hockey Buddy #1	Episode: "Those Lips, Those Ice"
1989	Thirtysomething	Alex	Episode: "About Last Night"
1989, 1991	China Beach	Ray / NCO #2	2 episodes
1989, 1992	Matlock	Gas Station Attendant / Clerk	2 episodes
1990	The Face of Fear	Guard #2	Television film
1990, 1991	Head of the Class	Foreman / M.I.T. Recruiter	2 episodes
1990	Hunter	Elmer Bickey	2 episodes
1991	Dragnet	Charles Miller	Episode: "Weekend Warrior"
1993	Danger Theatre	Dave Taylor	Episode: "Fatal Distraction/Lethal Luau"
1993	The Adventures of Brisco County, Jr.	Scratchy	Episode: "Pilot"
1993	Precious Victims	Deputy Hazelwood	Television film
1993, 1994	Bakersfield P.D.	Fred	2 episodes
1994	Viper	Rimmer	Episode: "Safe as Houses"
1995	Tom Clancy's Op Center	Lt. Corcoran	Miniseries
1995	The Home Court	Man #6	Episode: "Time Flies"
1995–1997	ER	E-Ray	13 episodes
1996	Woman Undone	Trim	Television film
1996	The Rockford Files: Friends and Foul Play	Gumpy Cook	Television film
1996	Boy Meets World	Garrett	Episode: "You Can Go Home Again"
1996	Sliders	Concierge	Episode: "Double Cross"
1996	Suddenly	Cabbie Mike	Television film
1997	Living Single	Lenny	Episode: "The Clown That Roared"
1999	Martial Law	Eugene	Episode: "Substitutes"
1999–2006	The West Wing	Steve	43 episodes
2001	The Nightmare Room	Principal Hunt	Episode: "Four Eyes"
2002	Watching Ellie	Father of the Bride	Episode: "Wedding"
2004	Cold Case	Walter Rafferty	Episode: "The Boy in the Box"
2005	My Name Is Earl	Guy	Episode: "White Lie Christmas"
2007	Saving Grace	Man with Cell Phone	Episode: "Is There a Scarlet Letter on My Breast?"
2008	NCIS	Bob Simms	Episode: "Murder 2.0"
2011	Eagleheart	Creepy Earl	Episode: "Creeps"
2012	Shameless	Clyde	Episode: "Father's Day"
2017	One Mississippi	Clancy	2 episodes
2018, 2019	Tropical Cop Tales	Don Quidong / Primetime Weeyums	2 episodes
2020	A West Wing Special to Benefit When We All Vote	Steve	Television film
