= Hybrids (2015 film) =

2015 film by Tony Randel

- Directed by: Tony Randel
- Written by: Tony Schweikle
- Produced by: Tony Randel; Tony Schweikle; Peter Wooley
- Starring: Paul Sorvino; Carolyn Hennesy
- Cinematography: David M. Rakoczy
- Edited by: Tony Randel
- Music by: Corey Wallace
- Production companies: HAS III; Peter Anthony Group
- Distributed by: Vision Films
- Release date: January 15, 2015 (Limited)
- Running time: 95 minutes
- Country: United States
- Language: English

Hybrids (also titled The Hybrids Family) is a 2015 American horror comedy family film directed by Tony Randel and starring Paul Sorvino and Carolyn Hennesy.

== Plot ==
The story of a dysfunctional family of vampires and witches and the two children who are hybrids.

== Cast ==
- Paul Sorvino as The Count
- Carolyn Hennesy as Aradia
- Mojean Aria as Blaz
- Philip Willingham as Todor
- Anne Leighton as Valantina
- Leanne Agmon as Velana
- Chris De Christopher as Tug
- Charles Noland as Prater
- Chuck Ardezzone as Vinni
- Lauren Lakis as Maria
- Jean St. James as Alice
- Lee Knorr as Nancy
- Erika Enggren as Alicia
- Rawle D. Lewis as Mr. Trellis
- Tatanka Means as Lance Hatton

== Production ==
Principal photography took place in Ave Maria, Florida for thirty days during the summer of 2014.

According to Chuck Ardezzone, the film created more than 50 jobs and worked with 34 local businesses during the movie shooting.

According to Tony Schweikle, "Burt Reynolds was on tap to play the father vampire, but then right before we finished the contract, he got very sick and couldn’t do it. Tony Randel knew one of Paul Sorvino’s daughters, and we offered Paul a script. Unbeknownst to us, he accepted and did the film for minimal money because he always wanted to play Bela Lugosi! We never knew that, but he’s talked about that in several interviews. It was serendipity."

== Accolades ==
The film won the Best Feature Comedy Film Award at the 20th annual International Family Film Festival (IFFF) in Santa Clarita, California.
