= Isobel English =

English novelist and short story writer (1920–1994)

June Braybrooke
- Born: June Guesdon Jolliffe; 9 June 1920; Kensington, London, England
- Died: 30 May 1994 (aged 73); Hampstead, London, England
- Resting place: Hampstead Cemetery
- Occupation: Novelist
- Spouses: Ronald Orr-Ewing (m. 1941; div. 1951) Neville Braybrooke (m. 1953)
- Writing career
- Pen name: Isobel English
- Language: English
- Notable work: Every Eye (1956)

June Guesdon Braybrooke (née Jolliffe; 9 June 1920 – 30 May 1994), better known by her pen name Isobel English, was an English writer. Her best-known novel is Every Eye. Fellow writer Stevie Smith called her tone "a voice of our times, ironical and involved".

== Life ==
Born in London to the Welsh civil servant John Mayne Jolliffe (1885–1957) and his Tasmanian wife May Guesdon (1885–1966), June was sent to Brittany, when she was two, for a salt-water cure for tuberculosis of the spine. On her return, she was sent in 1928 to La Retraite, a convent school in Burnham-on-Sea, Somerset, which she described in her 1956 novel Every Eye.

After secretarial college in London, she was taught literature by Kenneth Allott, while working with him. She married Ronald Dundas Orr-Ewing in 1941 and they had a daughter, Victoria, in the following year, but divorced in 1951. In 1953, she married a fellow writer, Neville Braybrooke (1923–2001).

English's many literary friends included Beryl Bainbridge, Olivia Manning and Stevie Smith, who described her tone as "very sagacious and very original – a voice of our times, ironical and involved". She died of leukaemia on 30 May 1994 and was buried in Hampstead Cemetery, London.

== Writings ==
Isobel English published her first book, The Key that Rusts, a year after she was married (having described her occupation as "writer" on her marriage certificate). Every Eye followed two years later and in 1961 her final novel Four Voices. She published numerous short stories. A collection of them, Life after All, appeared in 1973 and won the Katherine Mansfield Prize. A single never-staged play, Meeting Point, was published in The New Review.

English wrote introductions for Virago reissues of several of Olivia Manning's books and collaborated with Braybrooke on Manning's biography.

=== Bibliography ===
- The Key that Rusts (novel, 1954)
- Every Eye (novel, 1956, reprinted by Persephone Books in 2000)
- Four Voices (novel, 1961)
- The Gift Book (with Barbara Jones 1964)
- Life after All (stories, 1973, winner of the Katherine Mansfield Prize)
- Meeting Point (play, 1976, published in The New Review, Vol. 3, No. 29)
