= Jai Rodriguez =

American actor

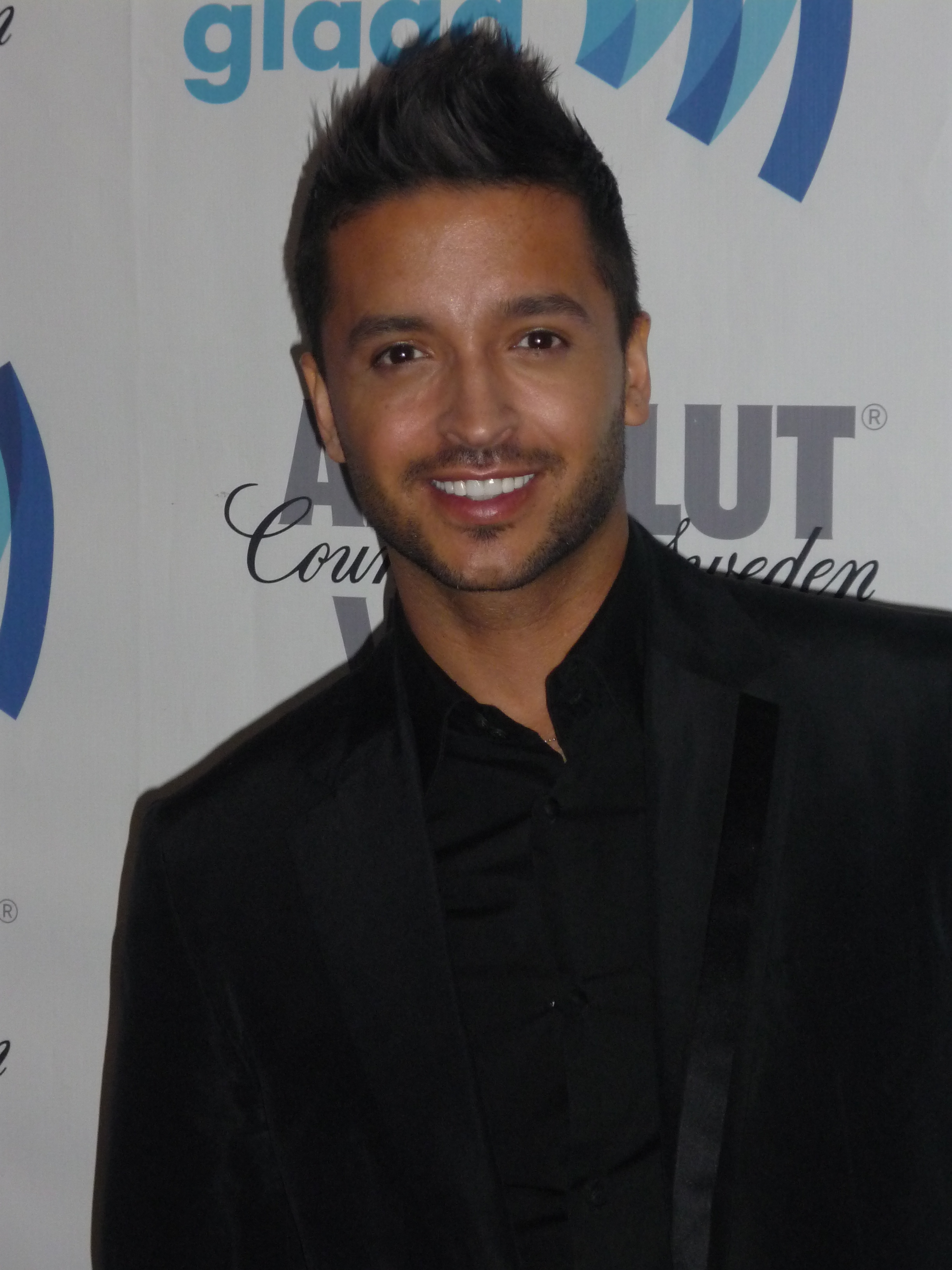
- Rodriguez in 2010
- Born: David Jai Rodriguez; June 22, 1979 (age 47)
- Occupations: Actor, musician
- Years active: 1993–present

David Jai Rodriguez (born June 22, 1979) is an American actor and musician best known as the culture guide on the Bravo network's Emmy-winning American reality television program Queer Eye for the Straight Guy. He also co-wrote a book with the other Queer Eye hosts. Rodriguez starred as Geoffrey in the sitcom Malibu Country from 2012 to 2013.

== Personal life ==
Rodriguez is of Puerto Rican and Italian descent, He performed with gospel choirs from the age of eleven, and studied musical theater at the Boces Cultural Art Center in Syosset, New York (now called Long Island High School for the Arts). He also attended Smithtown Christian School and Smithtown High School (now Smithtown West), where he performed in various plays. He is openly gay.

== Career ==
=== Acting ===
Rodriguez is a stage actor and singer best known for his roles in the Toronto cast of Broadway stage musical Rent, as Angel, and the Off-Broadway musical Zanna, Don't!, as Zanna. He has acted in several plays, including Spinning into Butter at the Lincoln Center. In 2005, he created and performed his stage show Jai Rodriguez: xPosed. xPosed told the story of Rodriguez's life and struggle to come out to his religious family as well as his career on stage and in Queer Eye. His Queer Eye co-stars Ted Allen and Carson Kressley appeared as themselves.

In November 1993, at age 14, Rodriguez appeared in one episode of the daytime drama All My Children. In August 2005, he made a two-day guest appearance on the daytime drama One Life to Live.

In November 2005, while Queer Eye was on filming hiatus, he joined the cast of The Producers on Broadway for three months, playing the role of Carmen Ghia. He played a different role, that of Sabu, in the 2005 Producers movie.

In August 2007, Rodriguez filmed a guest-starring role in drama series Nip/Tuck, playing the character of Chaz Darling. The episode (also titled "Chaz Darling") aired in November 2007.

In March 2010, Rodriguez appeared as a newscaster in the music video for "Telephone", with Lady Gaga and Beyoncé.

In February 2011, Rodriguez appeared in an episode of the ABC series Detroit 1-8-7 titled "Legacy; Drag City", playing a drag queen.

In March 2011, Rodriguez made an appearance in an episode of NBC's Harry's Law, titled "Send in the Clowns", as a transgender woman fired after an affair with a club owner was exposed.

In November 2011, Rodriguez appeared in an episode of How I Met Your Mother titled "The Rebound Girl", playing the husband of Barney Stinson's brother. He appeared again in March 2014 in the episode "Gary Blauman".

Rodriguez regularly guest performs in Cookin' with Gas , a long-running all improv show, at The Groundlings Theatre in Los Angeles.

In April 2012, he appeared in an episode of Bones as a murdering hairdresser.

On Malibu Country, Rodriguez was a regular cast member, playing record industry executive, Geoffrey.

In November 2014, Rodriguez appeared as Diego Diaz in Kingdom as a physical therapist.

From August 2014, Rodriguez appeared as "Ritchie Valentine" in The Horizon. In 2016, he appeared in an episode of The Bold and the Beautiful .

In 2025, Rodriguez portrayed the guest role of event planner Pietro on the soap opera The Young and the Restless. He debuted on May 28 of that year and appeared initially for four episodes before appearing for another episode in November of that year. Rodriguez has said that he loves the soap opera medium, explaining, "I think it's a real acting flex, because you get one take and you move on," he says. "People have gotten it down to a science where they're doing their prep, they're coming in, and they know their characters."

=== Television hosting ===
In 2003, Rodriguez became Queer Eye's resident "Culture Vulture", functioning as the show's expert on the topic of culture, and the show's success brought him increased exposure. He was a replacement host for the show's culture host who was originally cast, but has been part of Queer Eye since the third episode. This show includes five men who respectively are a grooming guru, food and wine connoisseur, fashion savant, a fashion stylist, and a culture vulture.

In April 2004, Rodriguez hosted Bravo on with the Show. This was a contest on Bravo in which 50 actors and actresses won a trip to New York City to work with Broadway professionals. This three-day workshop helped these teens develop their acting skills.

In May 2007, Rodriguez announced he would be appearing as a regular judge on two new reality shows: MTV's Shower Power (an American Idol-type singing contest) and Court TV's The Jury, (a Judge Judy-type show where cases are decided by a panel of celebrity judges).

On November 3, 2007, Rodriguez started co-hosting Ultimate Style, with Daisy Fuentes, on the Style Network. The weekly series covered celebrities, fashion, beauty, home and all things related to style. Also in 2007, Rodriguez hosted one season of travel/style show Styleyes on Sí TV.

Rodriguez also hosted the TV show Groomer Has It, which premiered April 12, 2008 on Animal Planet. He also appears on GSN Live as a sub host.

=== Music ===
As a singer, Rodriguez has performed on stage and as a recording artist. In 2002, he created his own musical cabaret show, titled Monday Night Twisted Cabaret, which ran at New York gay club xl for a year. Rodriguez continued to perform Twisted Cabaret on a sporadic basis from 2004 to 2006.

Rodriguez released his first single, "Love Is Good", on the indie record label Arrive at Eleven Productions in March 2003. He then recorded his debut album for Airgo Records. "Broken", the first single from the album, was released on October 4, 2007.

Rodriguez appeared as one of the celebrity singers on the TV show Celebrity Duets, which premiered August 29. He was eliminated on September 22, 2006.

=== Writing ===
Rodriguez is also a co-author of the New York Times bestselling book Queer Eye for the Straight Guy: The Fab Five's Guide to Looking Better, Cooking Better, Dressing Better, Behaving Better, and Living Better (Published by Clarkson Potter, 2004).

== Filmography ==
Year	Film	Role	Notes
2002	The New Guy	Jose	
2005	The Producers	Sabu	
2009	Oy Vey! My Son Is Gay!!	Angelo Ferraro	
2015	Kiss Me, Kill Me	Detective Santos	
2019	From Zero to I Love You	Andrew	
2022	Bros	Jason Shepherd	
2026	Stop! That! Train!	Reporter 3	

Year	TV	Role	Notes
1993	All My Children	Faith's Father	TV debut
2003–2007	Queer Eye for the Straight Guy	Himself	culture expert
2007	Nip/Tuck	Chaz Darling	episode: "Chaz Darling"
2008–2009	Groomer Has It	Himself	host
2010	Gigantic	Max Michaelson	3 episodes
2011	Detroit 1-8-7	Christina Draguilera/Joe	episode: "Legacy/Drag City"
2011	Harry's Law	Amanda Knott	episode: "Send in the Clowns"
2011–2014	How I Met Your Mother	Tom	2 episodes
2012	Days of Our Lives	Matteo	episode #1.11755
2012	Are You There, Chelsea?	Sandy/Chuck	episode: "Dee Dee's Pillow"
2012	Bones	Theo	episode: "The Don't in the Do"
2012–2013	Malibu Country	Geoffrey	series regular
2013	Betas	Salazar	episode: "One on One"
2014	Kingdom	Diego Diaz	3 episodes
2015	Hell's Kitchen	Himself	episode: "17 Chefs Compete"
2015	Liv and Maddie	Jacob Michaels	episode: "Ask Her More-A-Rooney"
2015–2019	EastSiders	Jimmy	8 episodes
2016	Grace and Frankie	Jojo	episode: "The Negotiation"
2016	Dance Moms	Himself/host	episode: "Girl Talk, Part 3"
2016	The Bold and the Beautiful	Photographer Sax	episode #1.7357
2017	The Magicians	Javier	episode: "The Flying Forest"
2017	Grey's Anatomy	Max	episode: "In the Air Tonight"
2017	Sharknado 5: Global Swarming	Peter	TV movie
2017	Dice	Doug	episode: "Fingerless"
2017	Wisdom of the Crowd	David Silva	2 episodes
2017	Ryan Hansen Solves Crimes on Television	Roosevelt Manager	episode: "Pilot"
2017	Kendra on Top	Himself	season 6
2018	The Resident	Channing Brewster	episode: "Family Affair"
2019	Dollface	Mario	episode: "Beauty Queen"
2020	The Rookie	Griffin	episode: "The Overnight"
2020	Equal	José Sarria	docuseries
2020	The Eric Andre Show	Himself	episode: "Bone TV"
2022	Bosch: Legacy	Officer Scott Templin	2 episodes
2022	Uncoupled	Jonathan #2	3 episodes
2023	Awkwafina Is Nora from Queens	Detective Johnson	2 episodes
2023	Around the Sun	Andrew	3 episodes
2024	High Potential	Jeff Lewis	1 episode
2025	The Young and the Restless	Pietro	Guest role
