= Jamal Duff =

American actor and football player (born 1972)

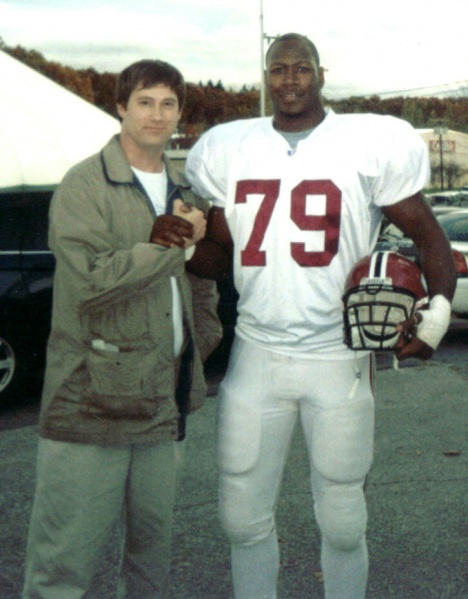

No. 96, 92
- Positions: Defensive end, defensive tackle

Personal information
- Born: March 11, 1972 (age 54); Columbus, Ohio, U.S.
- Listed height: 6 ft 7 in (2.01 m)
- Listed weight: 285 lb (129 kg)

Career information
- High school: Santa Ana (CA) Foothill
- College: San Diego State
- NFL draft: 1995: 6th round, 204th overall pick

Career history
- New York Giants (1995–1996); Washington Redskins (1997–1998); Chicago Bears (1999)*; Oakland Raiders (2000)*; Los Angeles Xtreme (2001)
- * Offseason or practice squad member only

Awards and highlights
- XFL Champion (2001)

Career NFL statistics
- Tackles: 54
- Sacks: 9
- Forced fumbles: 2
- Stats at Pro Football Reference

Jamal E. Duff (born March 11, 1972) is an American actor and former professional football player in the National Football League (NFL).

== Early life ==
Duff was born in Columbus, Ohio, but as a child, moved west with his family to Tustin, California, where he played football for Foothill High School. His older brother, John, also played football and went to New Mexico to play collegiately. However, Jamal played his college football at San Diego State University, carrying a major in graphic design. As a junior in 1993, Duff was named the Aztecs' Outstanding Defensive Player of the Year. As a senior, he notched 35 tackles and 7.5 sacks and was a second-team All-Western Athletic Conference selection.

== As a professional ==
Pre-draft measurables
Height	Weight	Arm length	Hand span	40-yard dash	10-yard split	20-yard split	20-yard shuttle	Vertical jump	Broad jump	Bench press
6 ft 6 3/4 in (2.00 m)	259 lb (117 kg)	34 1/2 in (0.88 m)	10 5/8 in (0.27 m)	4.91 s	1.73 s	2.85 s	4.56 s	34.5 in (0.88 m)	10 ft 3 in (3.12 m)	20 reps

Jamal Duff went to the NFL where he was selected in the sixth round of the 1995 NFL draft by the New York Giants. Duff played in all but one of New York's 16 regular-season games, starting two at defensive end, and recording four sacks. After spending the 1996 season on injured reserve with a foot injury, Duff signed with the Washington Redskins, playing 26 games over two seasons (1997–98) and recording five sacks. After Duff was released, he appeared in training camp with the 2000 Oakland Raiders but did not make the team.

The following spring, the Los Angeles Xtreme of the XFL came calling; LA head coach Al Luginbill had coached Duff at San Diego State in 1993. Duff became a fan favorite as one of the Xtreme's top defensive players (recording 18 tackles and four sacks), but also for his nickname. Thanks to an XFL rule that allowed players to put anything they wanted on the backs of their jerseys (within reason), Duff decided to name himself after an underground black comic strip character: Death Blow. The nickname was a hit with fans, and probably the second-most well known in the entire XFL, after Rod Smart's moniker "He Hate Me". The Xtreme won the XFL's first (and only) title.

== Acting career ==
While working as a graphic artist in Los Angeles, Duff moved into acting. He has appeared in S.W.A.T., The Rundown, The Eliminator, Dodgeball: A True Underdog Story, Revenge, Two and a Half Men, The Game Plan, Brooklyn Nine-Nine, Torque, The Marine, and Better Call Saul.

== See also ==
- History of the New York Giants (1994–present)

== Filmography ==
Year	Title	Role	Type
2003	S.W.A.T.	Subway Cop	Feature
2003	The Rundown	Jamal	Feature
2004	Dodgeball: A True Underdog Story	Me’Shell Jones (as Jamal E. Duff)	Feature
2004	The Eliminator	Darius	Direct-to-Video
2006	CSI: Crime Scene Investigation	Security Guard	TV Series
2006	All of Us	Unknown Role	TV Series
2006	In Justice	Convict Burgress	TV Series
2006	The Marine	Paul	Feature
2006	Monster Night	Coach Tiny	Direct-to-Video
2006	Backlash	Marine Guard	Feature
2007	The Game	Player #1	TV Series
2007	The Game Plan	Clarance Monroe	Feature
2007	Lords of the Underworld	Collins	Feature
2009	Blood: The Last Vampire	Bouncer	Feature
2009	Three7Nine	Security Guard	Short
2010	Perfect Combination	Greg Johnson	Feature
2010	Nike: The Black Mamba	Morretti Brother 1	Short
2010	Two and a Half Men	James	TV Series
2011	Traffic Light	Wrestler 2	TV Series
2011	Melissa & Joey	Huge Guy	TV Series
2011-2012	Revenge	Big Ed	TV Series
2012	Django Unchained	Tatum	Feature
2013	Sons of Anarchy	Black Prison Guard with Shiv	TV Series
2014	The Haunted Hathaways	Baliff	TV Series
2014	Workaholics	Bouncer	TV Series
2014	Scorpion	Henchman	TV Series
2015	Agents of S.H.I.E.L.D.	John Bruno	TV Series
2015	The Perfect Guy	Dreadlocks	Feature
2013-2015	Brooklyn Nine-Nine	Zeke	TV Series
2016	Fresh Off the Boat	Tough Guy 1	TV Series
2016	Loosely Exactly Nicole	Lester	TV Series
2016	Blunt Talk	Dramont Lewis	TV Series
2017	Play Dodgeball with Ben Stiller	Me’Shell Jones	Direct-to-Video
2017	Future Man	Burly Security Guard	TV Series
2017	Major Crimes	Tick	TV Series
2017	Bright	Junior	Feature
2018	This Is Us	Bouncer	TV Series
2018	The Debt Collector	2 Bits	Feature
2018	Raven's Home	Security Guard	TV Series
2020	Lucifer	Blaze	TV Series
2021	Rumble	Denise (voice)	Feature
2022	The Chi	Doorman	TV Series
2022	Better Call Saul	Huge Inmate	TV Series
2022	In The Ring With Daisy King	Denise	Podcast Series
2023	Night Court	Agent Sanders	TV Series
