= The Eliminator (film) =

- Film poster
- Directed by: Ken Barbet
- Story by: David Neilsen
- Starring: Bas Rutten; Michael Rooker
- Distributed by: MTI Home Video artist view entertainment
- Release date: February 1, 2004
- Running time: 90 minutes
- Country: United States
- Language: English

The Eliminator is a 2004 direct-to-video action film starring UFC champion Bas Rutten. The film was directed by Ken Barbet.

== Plot ==
Former LAPD cop, Dakota Varley (Bas Rutten), enters a power boat race seeking the prize of $250,000, but immediately discovers, first hand, that this race's risk matches the prize: one racer is killed, three others seriously injured in crashes and explosions. Varley tries to leave the lake and collect his prize money but is drugged and kidnapped by Dawson (Michael Rooker) and thrown into a different world: a world where survival means everything and no one follows the rules. Varley awakens on an island, strapped to pole, like a pig being carried to a barbecue. Surrounded by heavily armed men, he soon learns that he and six other victims have been assembled to be contestants in the ultimate survival game: they will be stalked nightly by hunters with rifles until there is one remaining survivor, who will win a $10,000,000 cash prize.

As the story unfolds, the other contestants are introduced: Jesse, an undercover DEA agent in Venezuela; Santha, a military instructor for a group of revolutionaries in Sierra Leone; and Darius, a sociopathic murderer, court-martialed and supposedly imprisoned by the U.S. Army for slaughtering 40 innocents in Kosovo. It is also learned, in bits and pieces, that each contestant has been brought to the game by a "Player": wealthy men and women who have each selected of one of the contestants. Among these men are Carlos Alvarez, Venezuelan Drug Lord; U.S. Army General Ellison; and Ochiro Sumani, a Japanese Gang Boss. All the while, the contestants struggle to survive the attacks not only by the hunters, but also from each other.

== Reception ==
The Eliminator wasn’t received well with critics nor audiences alike, with Rotten Tomatoes scoring it an 18%, with one critic calling it “Horrndously executed” noting bad editing and direction as a major flaw. Another described it as being entertaining “for all the wrong reasons” and a third commenting on how sad it was to see Michael Rooker in a movie like this.

Audience scores on IMDb were similar, with many calling the film out for poor quality, editing and direction. One user referred to the film as a “Low budget effort at Battle Royale” while another claimed it was terrible “even by DeathGame genre standards”. A positive review called the movie a “perfect mix of martial arts, hardened prisoners and jungles”. The film currently holds a 3.4 out of 10 user rating, according to 585 users.

== Cast ==
- Michael Rooker as Miles Dawson
- Bas Rutten as Dakota Varley
- Dana Lee as Ichiro Sumanni
- G. Anthony Joseph as Warden Sutherland
- Wolf Muser as Deitrich Kemmel
- Marco Ruas as Salvador
- Michael Gregory as General Ellison
- Gareth Myles as Watson
- Geoffrey Forward as Sir Crawley
- Jamal Duff as Darius Blake
- Ivo Cutzarida as Alvarez
- Danielle Burgio as Santha
- Paul Logan as Jesse
- Vicki Phillips as Tonya
- Stephen Wozniak as Rocker
