= 18-Year-Old Virgin =

2009 American sex comedy film

18 Year Old Virgin
- Directed by: Tamara Olson
- Written by: Naomi L. Selfman
- Produced by: David Michael Latt; David Rimawi; Paul Bales
- Starring: Olivia Alaina May; Lauren Walsh; Todd Leigh
- Cinematography: Ben De Sousa
- Edited by: Marq Morrison
- Production company: The Asylum
- Release date: January 20, 2009
- Running time: 90 minutes
- Country: United States
- Language: English

18-Year-Old Virgin is a 2009 American sex comedy film directed by Tamara Olson, written by Naomi L. Selfman and starring Olivia Alaina May, Lauren Walsh and Todd Leigh. It was produced by The Asylum.

== Premise ==
18-year-old virgin, Katie Powers lusts after fellow student, Ryan Lambert and hopes to have sex with him at the high school graduation party. However, Ryan has a policy of not having sex with virgins. This leads Katie on a quest to lose her virginity before the night of the party.

== Cast ==
- Olivia Alaina May as Katie Powers
- Lauren Walsh as Rose
- Todd Leigh as Spencer
- Dustin Harnish as Ryan Lambert
- Karmen Morales as Chelsea
- Daniel Sykes as Jeremy
- J. Michael Trautmann as Marshall
- Robbie Henke as Cisco
- Seth Cassell as Seth
- Collen Drew Henderson as Chuck
- Dustin Fitzsimons as Buck
- Danielle Gatto as Rachel
- Conor Moriarty as Trevor
- Madeline Higgins as Young Katie Powers
