= Gillian Lange =

Gillian Lange is the founder of Lange Foundation, a no-kill animal shelter in West Los Angeles, California, United States. Lange founded the foundation in 1993. Lange is a recipient of the City of Los Angeles St. Francis of Assisi Award in honor of her work with animals, which spans several decades. Since 1974, Lange has helped rescue more than 20,000 abandoned cats and dogs that would have otherwise been euthanized in city shelters.
