= Running Out of Time (2018 film) =

2018 film by Chris Stokes

Running Out of Time is a 2018 action film about a widow named Brenda Harbor who is played by Tasha Smith and is suddenly kidnapped with her family due to the actions of her dilatory husband's former life.

== Plot ==
Brenda discovers through her husband's BFF, Cain who is played by RonReaco Lee that possibly there is a secret file hidden somewhere in their home. Later on, everyone is kidnapped by some masked men who is claiming to kill them if they don't turn over the file. Time is running out and Brenda is willing to do anything to keep her family alive.

== Cast ==
- Tasha Smith as Brenda Harbor
- RonReaco Lee as Cain
- Telma Hopkins as Dolly
- Kearia Schroeder as Pamela Odell
- Sean Dominic as Clarence
- Dustin Harnish as Agent Spears
- Sydney Elise Johnson as Kristen
- Michael Toland as Conrad
- Paul Logan as Trent
- Tyrone Evans Clark as Banquet Attendee
- Joel Layogan as Car Jacking Victim

== Production ==
- Chris Stokes directed this feature and co-wrote it with Marques Houston.
- The film was produced by Brett Dismuke, Jarell Houston, Marques Houston, Jerome Jones, and Smooth.
- Cinematographer was Joel Layogan and the feature's editing was completed by Harvey White.
- Original music was created by Immanuel Rich.

== Release ==
The film was released on December 1, 2018, on BET and BET Her.

Later released again August 1, 2019, on Netflix.

== Accolades ==
Running Out Of Time was added to the 2018 Urbanworld Film Festival's screening lineup with Widows and Smallfoot.

== Reception ==
Karina Adelgaard of Heaven of Horror wrote, "When the plot is like something out of a soap opera (or the earlier mentioned 90s action movies), then you need to adjust your acting accordingly. This is something Tasha Smith manages to get away with in a way that makes her performance very entertaining."

In Raynbow Affair Magazine, DiamondKesawn wrote, “Babeeeeeeeeeeee! I was in my seat, popcorn in hand and in full view mode and this film did not disappoint.”

Amari of Wherever I Look wrote, "we learn who is behind the kidnappings, and things begin to get ridiculous. Especially as the villain explains how they are going to cover their tracks, and the kidnappers. From that point on, the film goes from seeming exciting to you wondering how are they going to wrap it up?"

In Geeks, Q-ell Betton wrote, "visually, the film looks good if a little too teal and orange for my liking. The house in the country is absolutely beautiful and looks amazing in a high-definition show house kind of way."
