= 200 mph =

- Directed by: Cole McKay
- Written by: Thunder Levin
- Produced by: David Michael Latt; David Rimawi; Paul Bales
- Starring: Jaz Martin; Hennely Jimenez; AnnaMaria DeMara; Darren Thomas; Zedrick Restauro; Jared Kahn; Paul Logan
- Cinematography: Alexander Yellen
- Music by: Chris Ridenhour
- Distributed by: The Asylum
- Release date: April 26, 2011
- Running time: 92 minutes
- Country: United States
- Language: English
- Budget: $200,000

200 mph is an auto racing action film directed by Cole McKay and distributed by The Asylum. It was released direct-to-DVD April 26, 2011. It is a mockbuster of the 2011 Universal Pictures film Fast Five.

== Plot ==
When the older brother (Tommy Nash) he idolizes is run off the road by a ruthless drug dealer (Darren Thomas) during a nighttime street race, Rick Merchant (Jaz Martin) channels his grief into getting revenge behind the wheel of his modified 1988 Mazda RX-7/Nissan 240sx with help from mechanic Kelly (Hennely Jimenez).

== Cast ==
- Jaz Martin as Rick Merchant
- Hennely Jimenez as Kelly Garcia
- AnnaMaria DeMara as Claudia
- Darren Thomas as Kayce
- Zedrick Restauro as Phong
- Jared Kahn as Albert
- Paul Logan as Officer Flynn
- Janet Tracy Keijser as Debbie Merchant
- Tommy Nash as Tom Merchant
- Sam Aaron as Lou
- Cleo Berry as Jake
- Makelaie Brown as Domingo Juarez
- Pason as Amber
- Sean Cory Cooper as Attendant
- Meredith Thomas as Cherrie, The Manager
- Mike Gaglio as Dr. Steven
- Chris Trouble Delfosse as "Trouble", Domingo's Lead Thug

== Production ==
The title first appeared November 2010 on the official Asylum website as "200 MPH: Midnight Racers". More details emerged when the official page on the website went live January 2010, around the same time principal photography began, revealing that the subtitle "Midnight Racers" had been dropped, and that the film would be directed by veteran stunts expert Cole McKay (Transformers: Dark of the Moon & Cloverfield) and was written by Thunder Levin. Only Jaz Martin, Anna Maria DeMara, Darren Thomas, and Hennely Jimenez were announced for the cast. The film was slated for release on April 26, 2011.

During production, the Mazda RX-7 used as Rick Merchant's car was stolen. The RX-7 belonged to award-winning professional drifter Justin Pawlak. The vehicle was inside a 26-foot enclosed Aztex trailer, attached to Pawlak's Chevrolet 2500HD, altogether stolen in the middle of production.

== Release ==
The film was released on DVD and Blu-ray on April 26, 2011. It was also made available for Video On Demand on cable and other websites including iTunes, Amazon, Zune (Also on Zune via Xbox Live), and Blockbuster.

Some foreign releases had given different titles to the film. In Greece it is released as 300 hlm, while in France the title is instead Fast Drive.

== Reception ==
The film has received mixed reviews from critics.

H. Perry Horton of film-centric blog Committed gave the film a positive review, praising lead actors Jaz Martin and AnnaMaria DeMara. He also praised the film for having "a lot of heart for an action flick, more heart, in fact, than most of the F&F films, without sacrificing action."

Noel Anderson of Goof Roof also gave the film a positive review, praising actors Hennely Jimenez and Paul Logan, and stating that "if you like furious displays of vehicular fury and strippers then this movie is a win win for you."

Christopher Armstead of Film Critics United described the film as "tolerable" as far as films released by The Asylum. He cited bad acting except for Darren Thomas, Paul Logan, and Tommy Nash. Armstead stated the movie "wasn’t all that bad all things considered. The car racing scenes, minus the CGI cutaways, were far better than I expected them to be."

Trevor Anderson of Movie Mavericks gave the film a mixed review, citing unnecessary cursing and nudity, and the CGI. The review, however, praised director Cole McKay for good acting from the actors and well-framed shots. Zedrick Restauro and Jared Kahn were commended for adding "a much needed spark to the group dynamic, particularly in the scene where they steal a car from an impound lot." Tommy Nash was described as the one that "shines the brightest", even though he is only in the movie for the first fifteen minutes.
