= Megafault =

- Official DVD Cover
- Genre: Disaster
- Written by: Paul Bales
- Directed by: David Michael Latt
- Starring: Brittany Murphy; Eriq Lasalle; Justin Hartley; Bruce Davison; Tamala Jones; Paul Logan; Jack Goldenberg
- Narrated by: Steven Parker
- Theme music composer: Adam Knapp; Ralph Rieckermann
- Country of origin: United States
- Original language: English

Production
- Producer: David Michael Latt
- Cinematography: Adam Silver
- Editor: Kristen Quintrall
- Running time: 90 minutes
- Production company: The Asylum
- Budget: $1.2 million

Original release
- Network: Syfy
- Release: November 24, 2009

MegaFault is a 2009 television disaster film by The Asylum, directed by David Michael Latt, starring Brittany Murphy, Justin Hartley, Eriq Lasalle, Tamala Jones, Paul Logan and Bruce Davison. It is one of the last films to feature Brittany Murphy, as she died a few weeks after its premiere. On Italy's CPOP, the movie is listed as the sixth best Tsunami Disaster Film movie. However, the movie received a severely negative reception from many viewers, critics and fansites, declaring it one of, if not the worst Disaster Movies to have ever been released. With Collider saying it is the third worst Disaster Film ever made.

== Plot ==
In West Virginia, Charles "Boomer" Baxter is setting mountain-top depletion explosives. He detonates the TNT, and an unprecedented earthquake devastates the area. A few hours later government seismologist Dr. Amy Lane arrives at the quake's epicenter.

She realizes that the quake has opened a deep fault running through the center of North America, ending at the San Andreas Fault. Any further instability will cause massive earthquakes and tsunamis, devastating Los Angeles, San Francisco and other cities all around the Pacific Ocean, leading to the deaths of millions.

Dr. Lane and Boomer chase just behind the expanding crack in the Earth's crust, developing a plan to stop the next quake. They decide to use a satellite orbiting above the continent which can trigger earthquakes. They fire it off when they reach the Grand Canyon, thinking that when the new fault hits the canyon it will be forced to turn south into the Gulf of Mexico. When the fault crosses with the canyon, they fire the satellite at the canyon but plan goes wrong. Instead of heading south, the fault travels north, towards the Yellowstone Caldera.

They realize that if the fault crosses the caldera it will explode, expelling several thousand tons of ash into the atmosphere, killing millions and causing a Volcanic winter. They decide to set explosives to block the fault's path. Later, when it reaches the park, Boomer detonates the explosives, causing the fault to stop just short of the volcano, but costing Boomer his life. In the end, an orbiting shot of the United States shows a giant canyon that stretches miles-wide across most of the continent.

== Cast ==
- Brittany Murphy as Dr. Amy Lane
- Eriq La Salle as Charles "Boomer" Baxter
- Justin Hartley as Dan Lane
- Bruce Davison as Dr. Mark Rhodes
- Tamala Jones as Marlena Johnson
- Paul Logan as Major Boyd Grayson
- Dana Tomasko as Female Tech
- Anya Benton as Radio Dispatcher
- Jack P. Downing as General Banks
- Sarah Garvey as Jerry Blair
- A.J. Haut as Guard #1
- Sheila Heubach
- Andrew Stephen Pratt as Officer Armstrong
- Miranda Schwien as Miranda Lane
- Jack Goldenberg as Sebastian

== Production ==
The film is a Sci Fi original film and is Brittany Murphy's final TV role as she died unexpectedly on December 20, 2009. It was all shot in the Quad Cities' Davenport, Iowa, with Davenport mayor Bill Gluba making a cameo appearance. The DVD includes a behind the scenes, cast and crew commentary, trailers and an extended version of the movie.

== Soundtrack ==
The soundtrack featured Victoria Mazze, Chris Ridenhour, and The Divine Madness.

== Release ==
It premiered on October 10, 2009 on the Syfy channel and was released on DVD on November 24, 2009. It premiered on December 10, 2010 in the UK on Sky Movies Premiere. In the autumn of 2015, Italy's Italia 2 broadcaster, would premiere the movie

== Reception ==
Italy's Everyeye said that the film was a horrendous piece of Cinema, declaring that: "in the genre of Disaster Films, it has now become abundantly clear that they are the most shameless products that mankind could ever savour to create. With horrendous acting, the shallowest of effects and a narrative that is as fine as an expiration date". Proceeding to say that: "From Black River Mountain To Yellowstone's Volcano, the movie tries to balance the little it has, but failing to change even a miniscule comma." Ending by saying: "Megafault is nothing more than a rehash of the rehashes, in a movie where the world is again in danger by strange inhuman forces, inside a severely expired horror formula and special effects blander than a multiverse." Rating it a 4 out of 10. Kevin Carr from 7M Pictures said that it: "manages to tell an ongoing story while throwing enough special effects at you to keep your eyes busy." Saying that the acting is also one of its best bits. However, he disliked the acting and the story's writing, giving it a 3/5 rating.

ILoveDisasterMovies said that: "For what is obviously a low budget movie, Mega Fault refuses to bow down and be a chit-chat film and tries its best to be full action from start to finish. Yes, the script is pretty awful but thankfully there’s not too much of it. This combined with a generally decent standard of acting (and not too much over acting) makes it much easier to forgive Mega Fault’s shortcomings and concentrate on its strengths." Continuing by saying that the effects are as similar as every other film, "showing you that the movie is higher budget than what it actually is". Ending by saying: "I throughly enjoyed Mega Fault. It’s one of the best low budget disaster movies I’ve seen in a long time. It cuts out the shmucky plot, the love triangles and the padding and gives us 90 minutes of low budget thrils and spills. As a result, it gives decent bang for its buck and doesn’t feel quite so out of place compared to its big screen rivals. At its best, you can disengage your brain and enjoy and at its worst you can laugh at its silly science."

Kevin Matthews from FlickFeast said that the acting is horrendously bad, the script is awful and the whole movie is a joke, saying that it's "Laughably entertaining in all the wrong ways".
