= Paul Logan (actor) =

American actor

- Born: Paul Logan Stone; October 15, 1973 (age 52); New Jersey, United States
- Occupations: Actor, model, stuntman, martial artist, producer, screenwriter
- Years active: 1996–present

Paul Logan Stone (born October 15, 1973) is an American actor, model, martial artist, stuntman, producer and screenwriter. He is best known for his roles in low budget action films such as Syfy's Mega Piranha. Logan is also known for his portrayal of Glen Reiber on the NBC soap opera, Days of Our Lives.

== Education ==
Logan completed a degree in biochemistry at State University of New York at Purchase and followed this with courses of Chiropractic at the Los Angeles College of Chiropractic.

== Career ==
After a few small parts on a few early films and television episodes, Logan gained better screen time with the movie Killers in 1997. Logan would also appear in the Triple-B genre film, L.E.T.H.A.L. Ladies: Return to Savage Beach. A year later he made appearances in the TNT television series' L.A. Heat and UPN's Malcolm & Eddie. In 2000, Logan appeared in the mockumentary, The Independent. In 2001, he appeared in the Buffy the Vampire Slayer spin-off, Angel. In that same year Logan was cast as Glen Reiber in Days of Our Lives.

In 2003, Logan made a guest appearance in an episode of the NBC television sitcom, Friends. He followed this up with a series of action films such as The Eliminator, Curse of the Komodo and Way of the Vampire where he portrayed Dracula.

In 2008, Logan appeared in The Terminators. A year later, Logan's athletic background came in handy for the martial art-styled action film, Ballistica, with a leading role as a top-notch CIA agent trained in the title art of Ballistica (hand-to-hand combat with firearms). In that same year, he appeared alongside Brittany Murphy in the disaster film Megafault. Logan's third film with The Asylum saw him in a leading role as the US commando sent to South America to stop mutating killer-fish in the SyFy original Mega Piranha. The film garnered 2.2 million viewers on the network, making it the channel's most-watched film of the year so far.

Most recently, Logan would write, produce and star in the 2016 action horror film, The Horde.

In 2018, Logan starred in the movie Running Out Of Time as the character Trent on BET and BET Her. As of 2026, Logan has become a household name in B movie cinema, and is general considered to be a leading man in B movie and Indie productions. In 2025, Logan starred in the action thriller, President Down.

== Filmography ==
=== Film ===
Year	Title	Role	Notes
1996	American Tigers	Terrorist	
1996	Blazing Force	Greko	Video
1997	Killers	Nicky	
1998	L.E.T.H.A.L. Ladies: Return to Savage Beach	Doc Austin	
1998	Club Wild Side	Tom	
1999	Stripper Wives	Joe	
2000	The Independent	Son	
2000	House of Love	Rick	
2000	The Seduction of Maxine	Jack	
2001	Savage Season	Kevin	
2001	The Ultimate Game	Sam Slater	
2002	Passion's Peak	James	Video
2004	Curse of the Komodo	Drake	
2004	Radius	The Diamone	Short
2004	The Eliminator	Jesse	
2005	The Vault	Frix	
2005	Way of the Vampire	Dracula	
2005	Crash Landing	Josef	
2005	Komodo vs. Cobra	Major Frank	TV movie
2005	Crippled Creek	Tom	
2005	Freezerburn	SWAT Team Leader	
2006	A.I. Assault	Saunders	TV movie
2006	Cannibal Taboo	Luke Hendricks	Video
2007	White Air	Pete	
2007	Fall Guy: The John Stewart Story	Jake Adams	Video
2008	The Last Bad Neighborhood	Mack	
2009	Vampire in Vegas	Milo	
2009	The Terminators	TR-4	Video
2009	Aliens on Crack	Alien King	
2009	Lost in the Woods	Lead Mercenary	
2009	Megafault	Major Boyd Grayson	TV movie
2009	Ballistica	Damian Sloan	
2010	Re-Generator	Captain Rob Stevens	
2010	Mega Piranha	Jason Fitch	TV movie
2010	#1 Cheerleader Camp	Tom	Video
2011	200 mph	Officer Flynn	Video
2013	Code Red	Captain John McGahey	
2015	God's Club	Firefighter	
2016	Sniper: Special Ops	Charlie	
2016	The Horde	John Crenshaw	Video
2016	A Doggone Christmas	Cutler	
2016	Skookum: The Hunt for Bigfoot	Gator Boudreaux	
2017	A Doggone Hollywood	Dirk Stevens	
2017	Circus Kane	Valentine	
2017	Puppet Master: Axis Termination	Captain Brooks	
2017	The Sandman	Heller	
2017	Halloween Pussy Trap Kill! Kill!	Captain Lewis	
2018	Atlantic Rim: Resurrection	Lee	
2018	A Doggone Adventure	Jack Bowser	
2018	Paying Mr. McGetty	Low-Gunn	
2018	American Warfighter	Captain Jerry Pope	
2018	Flight 666	Austin	
2018	The Most Dangerous Man	Sgt. Max Gunn	
2018	The Last Sharknado: It's About Time	Egyptian Guard	TV movie
2018	Running Out Of Time	Trent	
2018	CobraGator	Jake Dixon	
2019	Breaking Barbi	Agent Kenneth Radcliff	
2020	Facade	Ryder	
2020	DieRy	Karl	
2020	The Amityville Harvest	Robbie	
2020	Loss of Grace	Jordan	
2021	Night of the Falling Stars	Mark Alston	
2022	United Trans Logistics: We Carry Your Trust	Archer	Short
2022	Killer Design	Derek	TV movie
2022	The Stepmother	Police Officer	
2022	Bigfoot or Bust	Billy James	
2022	Forbearance	Bo Erb	
2022	Hairball	Helen's Husband	Short
2022	A Prince and Pauper Christmas	Agent Nolan	TV movie
2022	2025 Armageddon	Officer Greg Stern	
2022	The Ice Cream Stop	Sebastian Reynolds	Short
2023	You're Not Alone	Justin Humphries	
2023	Spider-Man: Lotus	Dennis Carradine / Burglar	
2023	Outlaw Johnny Black	Bounty Hunter	
2023	Alien Apocalypse	Captain Jensen	
2023	America Is Sinking	Captain Pierce	
2024	DinoGator	Jake Dixon	TV Movie
2025	President Down	Breacher	

=== Television ===
Year	Title	Role	Notes
1997	Erotic Confessions	Jake	Episode: "Through an Open Window"
1999	L.A. Heat	Eric Sommers	Episode: "Fangs"
1999	Malcolm & Eddie	Dancer #3	Episode: "The Fool Monty"
2001	Thrills	Brian	Episode: "A Most Dangerous Desire"
2001	Sexy Urban Legends	Fred	Episode: "Stormy Weather"
2001	Angel	Woody	Episode: "Carpe Noctem"
2001–02	Days of Our Lives	Glen Reiber	Regular Cast
2003	Friends	The Soap Actor	Episode: "The One Where Rachel Goes Back to Work"
2007	Smith	Eli	Episode: "Five"
2012	The Vampire Show	Security Guard #2	Episode: "Episode #1.2"
2020	The Circuit	FBI Agent Johnny	Episode: "Ranch Terror"
2022	Keeping Up with the Joneses	Brick	Recurring Cast

=== Music video ===
Year	Artist	Song	Role
2012	Olivia Dunkley	"Not Ok You Left Me"	Himself
