= Curse of the Komodo =

- DVD cover
- Directed by: Jim Wynorski
- Written by: Steve Latshaw
- Produced by: Sam A. Hasass; Alison Semenza
- Starring: Tim Abell; Melissa Brasselle; William Langlois; Gail Harris; Paul Logan; Glori-Anne Gilbert; Ted Monte; Cam Newlin; Jay Richardson; J.P. Davis; Richard Gabai
- Release date: 2004
- Running time: 92 minutes
- Country: United States

Curse of the Komodo is a 2004 American science fiction film directed by Jim Wynorski under the pseudonym Jay Andrews. On an isolated island in the middle of the Pacific Ocean, genetically mutated Komodo dragons find themselves facing the prospect of a feast. Their main course consists of a team of scientists that has been ordered by the military to destroy all evidence of the secret experiments it has been conducting. Their dessert is served in the form of a group of robbers who arrive on the forsaken island. Unless the group manages to destroy the killer lizards, mankind is doomed. It was followed by Komodo vs. Cobra.

== Plot ==
An experiment on an isolated island in the middle of the Pacific Ocean results in the enlargement of a group of Komodo dragons. However, the dragons break free and kill most of the scientists, the only survivor being Rebecca Phipps, whose father Nathan is part of the program. Later, a military team is dispatched to kill the dragons. All are killed except soldiers Hanson and Jason Blake, who hide in Rebecca's private house with an electric gate. Nathan and his colleague, and girlfriend, Dawn Porter, are soon sent to rescue the survivors.

On an island in Hawaii, a group of criminals consisting of Drake, Reece, and Drake's girlfriend, Tiffany, rob a casino and escape in a helicopter with their pilot, Jack. However, they're forced to land on the island due to a storm. The next morning, Dawn collects evidence that proves the Komodo's venom has the ability to infect humans, turning them into zombie-like creatures. Jack tells the criminals he needs spare parts to fix damage inside the helicopter's engine. As they begin wandering the island, they find Dawn, Nathan, Rebecca, and Hanson fighting one of the dragons, which has infected Jason. The group manages to evade the dragon, and Nathan reluctantly lets the criminals reside in the house. Nathan attempts to negotiate a rescue with military officer Foster on the mainland, although Foster keeps pushing back the rescue mission.

Later that night, Reece, who had come in contact with the Komodo's saliva earlier, slowly becomes infected. The Komodo returns, and the men desperately attempt to fight it off. An infected Reece walks outside and is eaten by the Komodo, which heads back into the jungle. The next day, Nathan becomes fed up with Foster's negotiations and convinces the group to make a break for the helicopter, which Jack reveals was never damaged. During the trip to the helicopter, Tiffany and Hanson are killed, and Nathan becomes infected, slowly turning into a zombie. The group soon reaches the helicopter, although encounter the Komodo. Nathan sacrifices himself by distracting the Komodo long enough to allow Jack, Dawn, Drake, and Rebecca to reach the helicopter. Nathan had armed himself with C-4 explosive, which once swallowed by the Komodo, destroys the Komodo.

On the mainland, Foster initiates a bombing of the entire island in order to eliminate witnesses of the experiment's creations. The survivors are about to take off, although Drake goes back for a bag containing the casino money, which he had left behind. The bombing soon occurs, forcing Jack, Dawn, and Rebecca to take off, leaving Drake on the island. Upon learning that three survivors have escaped the island, Foster commits suicide. On the island, Drake is revealed to have survived the bombing, but is soon eaten by a group of Komodo offspring.

== Cast ==
- Tim Abell as Jack
- Gail Harris as Dawn Porter
- Melissa Brasselle as Tiffany
- Paul Logan as Drake
- Jay Richardson as Foster
- Cam Newlin as Reece
- Glori-Anne Gilbert as Rebecca Phipps
- Ted Monte as Hanson
- William Langlois as Nathan Phipps
- J.P. Davis as Jason Blake
- Arthur Roberts as Detective
- Richard Gabai as Jeffries
- Daryl Haney as Finton
- Scott Fresina as Hotel Guest
- Buck Flower as The Cashier
- Robert Donavan as Hotel Manager
- Rob Sanchez as Security Guard
- Benjamin Sacks as Military Liaison

== Production ==
The film had its origins when Wynorski was shooting the film Treasure Hunt in Hawaii. He says he "took three of the actors to a secluded waterfall location on their day off and shot what would become the first segment of Curse. Later, when I returned to Los Angeles, Steve Latshaw wrote the entire script based on segment I had already shot on location. It all turned out rather fun; so much so that they asked me to do a sequel. I said I would do it provided they sent myself and the entire cast to Hawaii to film it...which they did."

== Reception ==
Critical reception was mostly negative.
