= Nathan Owens =

American actor, model, and producer (born 1984)

- Born: Nathan John Owens; March 9, 1984 (age 42); Daly City, California, U.S.
- Occupations: Model; actor
- Years active: 2007–present
- Known for: Days of Our Lives; Devious Maids

Nathan John Owens (born March 9, 1984) is an American actor, model, and producer. Owens portrayed Cameron Davis on Days of Our Lives and was a series regular as Jesse Morgan on the Lifetime comedic-drama series Devious Maids.

== Career ==
Owens began his career working as a model. He has appeared in several issues of GQ, as well as many commercial and print campaigns for Vuori, Gap, Polo, Izod, Tommy Hilfiger, J.Crew, Peter Millar, Sperry, Tommy Bahama, and Abercrombie and Fitch to name a few. He also has the distinction of being the second African-American ever to be featured in a fragrance campaign for Polo Ralph Lauren Big Pony.

Owens moved from NYC to LA initially as a host for 1st Look on NBC He remained hosting the show but made his acting debut (Outside of commercials) starring opposite Rihanna in the music video to her song, California King Bed and later, opposite Nicki Minaj in Va Va Voom.

In October 2012, it was announced that Owens had joined the cast of Days of Our Lives as a recast of Cameron Davis. Owens was released from his contract with Days of Our Lives in July 2013 and made his final appearance in November 2013. Owens was later accepted to ABC's Diversity Showcase. Owens joined the cast of Devious Maids for its third season in the role of Jesse Morgan, a character described as "a handsome military vet who returns stateside to settle back into civilian life." In 2016, Owens reprised the role of Jesse in the fourth and final season.

In September 2020, Owens joined the cast Batwoman in the recurring role of Ocean. He also starred in Ion Television's television film, The Christmas Sitters. In 2022, Owens joined the cast of 9-1-1: Lone Star in the recurring role of Julius Vega.

On December 12, 2024, it was announced Owens had joined the cast of The Young and the Restless as Holden Novak. He made his first appearance during the January 8, 2025, episode.

== Personal life ==
Nathan Owens was born in Daly City, California. His family later relocated to Sacramento where he finished school. Once he started modeling in 2007 he shot a campaign for Ruehl No.925 with photographer Bruce Weber in New York City. That campaign inspired him to move to NYC. After living there for 6 months he booked a hosting job for an NBC subsidiary out in Los Angeles and relocated once again. He splits his time between Northern and Southern California.

== Filmography ==
Television
Year	Title	Role	Notes
2012–2013	Days of Our Lives	Cameron Davis #2	Series regular; 155 episodes
2013	The Audition	Chris	Television film
2015-16	Devious Maids	Jesse Morgan	Main role (seasons 3–4); 19 episodes
2017	The Carmichael Show	Todd	Episode: "Lesbian Wedding"
2020	The Christmas Sitters	Max	Television film
2021	Batwoman	Ocean	Recurring role (season 2); 11 episodes
2022	Dollface	Max	Episode: "Space Cadet"
2022	9-1-1: Lone Star	Julius Vega	Recurring role
2023	Lethal Legacy	Darren	Television film
2024	A Season to Remember	Iggy Love	Television film
2025	The Young and the Restless	Holden Novak	Series regular (2025–2026); Recurring role (since 2026)
