= The Terminators (film) =

- Directed by: Xavier S. Puslowski
- Screenplay by: David Michael Latt
- Story by: William Morey
- Produced by: David Michael Latt; David Rimawi; Paul Bales
- Starring: Jeremy London; A Martinez; Paul Logan
- Cinematography: Mark Atkins
- Distributed by: The Asylum
- Release date: April 28, 2009
- Running time: 90 minutes
- Country: United States
- Language: English
- Budget: $250,000

The Terminators is a 2009 American science fiction film directed by Xavier S. Puslowski, starring Jeremy London, A Martinez, Paul Logan, and produced by The Asylum. As a mockbuster, it was released one month prior to the premiere of the fourth film in the Terminator franchise, Terminator Salvation. This film is unrelated to the Terminator franchise.

== Plot ==
The film takes place at an undetermined point in the future, when humanity has developed advanced robotic technology with enhanced artificial intelligence. This includes the use of cybernetic organisms (or cyborgs) called the TR-4 (all TR-4s are played by Paul Logan) for general labor. After being reprogrammed by the newest model TR-5, the machines instigate a cybernetic revolt against humanity, bombing cities and sending thousands of armed, identical TR-4 androids to eradicate all human life.

A band of survivors, led by small-town Sheriff Reed (A Martinez), battle to survive and defeat the TR-4s. During their journey, they encounter a mysterious man, Kurt Ross (Jeremy London) who possesses a weapon that can disable any TR-4 it hits. Ross also has intimate knowledge of the TR-4s and is heavily implied to have met Reed in the past. With Ross's help, Reed's group struggles through several battles with the TR-4s and ultimately locate an airship used by the machines to travel. Ross proposes that they travel to the space station where the TR-4s originate from and shut them down remotely, but they must first acquire fuel for the ship. They find the fuel, but Sheriff Reed is shot in the leg by a TR-4.

On the ship, the survivors discover metal beneath Reed's skin, causing him to begin questioning his existence. Ross reveals that Reed is actually one of the first TR-5s, planted in the community with Ross as his handler. Reed's memories are all implants based on Ross's own memories. Bronson (Dustin Harnish) becomes paranoid and believes the other survivors are also cyborgs, but Chloe (Lauren Walsh) persuades him by revealing she is pregnant. At the space station, the group battles the TR-4s en masse, resulting in Bronson's death and Tiffany (Lucinda Rogers) becoming separated from the others. Ross attempts to shut down the TR-4s but the control console fights back, repeatedly locking him out. Suddenly, the TR-4s all shut down, and Ross ominously realizes their power is being funneled to a much worse problem – the giant TR-5 that caused the rebellion in the first place. The massive robot appears and kills Ross with a blade mounted in its arm after shrugging off his EMP weapon, then attacks Chloe. Reed appears and baits the TR-5 into an airlock, and Chloe ejects both it and Reed into outer space. The TR-4s come back to life despite Tiffany hitting the shutdown switch, but when she rips the cords from the control box, they all die simultaneously. Chloe, Tiffany, Tanner, and Chloe's unborn child are left as the only survivors, possibly of all humanity.

== Cast ==
- Jeremy London as Kurt Ross
- A Martinez as Sheriff Reed Carpenter
- Paul Logan as TR-4
- Lauren Walsh as Chloe
- Sara Tomko as Pallas
- Dustin Harnish as Bronson
- Clint Browning as Chuck
- Lucinda Rogers as Tiffany
- Mark Hengst as Tanner
- Krystle Connor as Laura
- Gary Miller-Youst as Sam (credited as Gary Youst)
- Joel Hebner as Anson (credited as Joel E. Hebner)
- Naómi Hurter as Paige (credited as Naomi Hurter)
- Russell Reynolds as Captain Engineer (credited as G. Russell Reynolds)
- Stephen Blackehart as Logan
- Jason S. Gray as Lipinski
