= Malcolm Winters =

Fictional character from The Young and the Restless

- The Young and the Restless character
- Shemar Moore as Malcolm Winters
- Portrayed by: Shemar Moore (1994–2005, 2014–present); Darius McCrary (2009–2011)
- Duration: 1994–2002; 2004–2005; 2009–2011; 2014; 2019; 2023; since 2026
- First appearance: May 5, 1994
- Created by: William J. Bell
- Introduced by: Edward J. Scott (1994); John F. Smith and David Shaughnessy (2004); Maria Arena Bell and Paul Rauch (2009); Jill Farren Phelps (2014); Anthony Morina and Josh Griffith (2019); Josh Griffith and Sally McDonald (2026)
In-universe information
- Occupation: Photographer
- Siblings: Neil Winters
- Spouse: Keesha Monroe (1996); Olivia Hastings (1997–2000); Sofia Dupre (2011)
- Children: Lily Winters; Holden Novak
- Adoptive children: Nathan Hastings, Jr.
- Grandchildren: Charlie Ashby; Mattie Ashby
- Nieces and nephews: Devon Hamilton (adoptive); Moses Winters

Malcolm Winters is a fictional character from the CBS soap opera The Young and the Restless. Created by William J. Bell, Malcolm was introduced in May 1994, portrayed by Shemar Moore. Moore exited the role in 2002, and returned for a ten-month stint from November 2004 to September 2005. In 2009, the character was reintroduced, with Darius McCrary assuming the role, before exiting again in October 2011. In 2014, Jill Farren Phelps reintroduced the character, with Moore reprising the role. He made subsequent guest returns in April 2019 and May 2023, respectively. In April 2026, he returned to the role again when Malcolm returned to Genoa City after being diagnosed with aplastic anemia.

Malcolm is the half-brother of Neil Winters (Kristoff St. John). His history includes getting Neil's wife, Drucilla Winters, pregnant, as well as other conflicts with his brother, his history as a photographer, and marriages to Olivia Winters and Sofia Dupre.

== Casting ==
The role was originated by Shemar Moore on May 5, 1994, who received a Daytime Emmy Award for Outstanding Supporting Actor in a Drama Series for his portrayal in 2000, with nominations for Outstanding Younger Actor in 1996 and 1997. After much speculation that Moore would exit the soap opera in 2000, he confirmed that he would depart at the end of his contract in the spring of 2001. However, in February 2001, Moore announced that he had extended his contract through the end of that year. In December, he announced he was leaving The Young and the Restless, and last aired on February 14, 2002. In September 2004, after a two-year absence, Moore was announced to reprise the role. Of Moore's return, former co-head writer John F. Smith stated: "We are thrilled to have Shemar back with us. His story will be something very unexpected, off the page, and exciting. The man is going to have impact." Moore made his return on November 1, 2004. However, within weeks, Moore's publicist revealed that his return would be short-lived, as he had only signed a six-month contract. The publicist stated: "He's auditioning now [for other projects] and he has two or three films coming out next year. You know how this industry is. At least [The Young and the Restless will] have him for six months." Moore made his final appearance as the character on September 1, 2005.

"I have been doing this long enough to know a few things. Look, Shemar is a great guy and a great actor, and a beautiful human being, but he is Shemar and I am Darius. I have been [acting] since I was nine years old. So whatever the role is, I am going to do the best I can do. [..] Nobody brought up Shemar and it's cool. It has not been a thing of 'Oh, Shemar did this.' Everybody is giving me the love and respect to allow me to do what I do as an actor, and that was one of the beautiful things about this from the beginning. When I went in I did not know what to expect."

— McCrary, explaining the differences between himself and Moore (2009)

In September 2009, it was announced that the soap opera had put out a casting call for the role of Malcolm. In November, Darius McCrary was announced to be joining the cast, in his first daytime television role, with his first appearance on December 29, 2009. In September 2011, it was announced that McCrary had been let go from The Young and the Restless. He made his final appearance on October 17, 2011. On July 23, 2014, CBS Daytime announced that Moore would reprise the role of Malcolm for a two-episode guest stint starting on September 10, 2014. In March 2019, it was announced that Moore would return for another two-episode guest stint, following the death of Kristoff St. John.

On February 17, 2026, it was announced Moore would again reprise the role. He returned to set the same day. His return aired during the April 7 episode.

== Storylines ==
=== 1994–2005 ===
Malcolm first arrives in Genoa City in 1994, determined to rebuild his relationship with his estranged half-brother, Neil Winters. Neil, at first, wants nothing to do with his rebellious younger half-brother, but eventually decides to give him a second chance. With the help of Blade Bladeson, Malcolm became Genoa City's most prominent photographer.

He develops a friendship with Neil's wife Drucilla Barber, and is instantly smitten with her, but nothing becomes of it. However, Malcolm later discovers Drucilla after she has taken a good dose of cold medication, and thus mistakes Malcolm for Neil. After Drucilla calls out for Neil, making Malcolm realize her advances were not intended for him, Malcolm chooses to rape her. The following morning, Malcolm realizes what a mistake he has made and confides his crime to Dru's sister, Olivia.

Nine months later, Drucilla gives birth to a daughter, Lily Winters. Having convinced herself that Neil is Lily's father, Dru forgives Malcolm and Olivia soon fixes him up with her hospital colleague, Keesha Monroe. They fall in love and marry, just before Keesha dies of AIDS.

Malcolm then develops a relationship with recently widowed Olivia and grows very attached to her son Nathan Hastings, Jr. Malcolm and Olivia marry in 1997. One year later, Malcolm's ex-girlfriend Callie Rogers arrives in town and Olivia becomes jealous that Malcolm is spending so much time with her. Olivia's insecurity ultimately destroys her marriage to Malcolm and he rebounds back to Callie. The two become engaged. Callie's former music manager, Trey Stark, stalks her, which leads to an incident that almost costs Malcolm his life and endangers Nate. After Callie confesses that Trey is her estranged husband, Malcolm calls the engagement off and Callie leaves town. In the meantime, Malcolm continues his close relationship with his former stepson Nate, who views Malcolm as his father.

Malcolm and Neil soon find themselves fighting over a woman, attorney Alex Perez. Malcolm and Alex fall in love and become engaged, though she is also developing feelings for Neil. While the three of them are on business in Kenya, Malcolm mistakenly overhears Alex confess her feelings to Neil and leaves. While driving over a bridge, on the way to a photo shoot, the bridge collapses and Malcolm is presumed dead.

Malcolm returns to town two years later resenting Neil, believing he purposely did not do enough to rescue him in Kenya, so that he could have Alex for himself. Eventually the two bury the hatchet. While in town, Malcolm briefly has a fling with Adrienne Markham, Damon Porter's ex-wife.

Malcolm then demands that Dru take a paternity test to determine once and for all if he is Lily's biological father. When Malcolm is proven to be Lily's father, he and Dru decide to keep it a secret and he leaves town. While Malcolm is gone, Lily and Neil discover the truth about her paternity, but are unable to contact him.

=== 2009–present ===
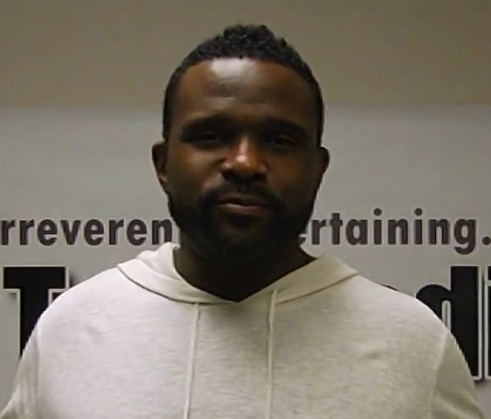
Darius McCrary was recast into the role in 2009; he departed in 2011.

Four years later, Malcolm returned to Genoa City while secretly working undercover as a corporate spy for Tucker McCall. He learns that Lily had been diagnosed with ovarian cancer and attempted to support her while clashing with Neil. However, the two eventually put aside their differences and reconnected as brothers. Malcolm took a job as a photographer at Restless Style magazine and hired his adopted nephew, Devon Hamilton, as his assistant. Months after Malcolm mentioned he was engaged, his fiancée, Sofia Dupre, arrived in town. She worked for Tucker and had a business clash with Neil, and they ended up having a one-night stand and not telling Malcolm to act like it never happened. Malcolm and Sofia were married soon after.

Sofia is later found out to be pregnant, though the paternity of the baby was left undetermined. While pregnant, Sofia was forced to tell Malcolm the truth about her night with Neil, and that she wasn't sure of the paternity of the baby. Sofia gave birth to a boy named Moses Winters, after her father. Afterward, a paternity test showed that Neil is Moses's father. Devastated, Malcolm had to make a decision about his future with Moses, and visited Sofia in the hospital and asked her to sign divorce papers and tells her that he will be moving away, even though Sofia wanted to work out their marriage. Malcolm said goodbye to Genoa City and headed for the airport.

In September 2014, Malcolm returned to Genoa City, planning to overcome his differences with Neil, and help him cope with his sudden blindness. The two re-establish their relationship as brothers and Malcolm heads off to his next photo shoot. After Neil's sudden death, Malcolm returns to Genoa City to be with the family. At Neil's funeral, Malcolm gives a tearful and emotional eulogy stating that while his relationship with his brother wasn't always perfect, he always had an unconditional love and admiration for him. He thanks Neil for all he's done for him and given him. After comforting everyone at the house, Malcolm heads back on the road, promising to stay in touch. He surprises the family with a brief visit in 2023 to a gala in honor of Neil. They reflect and catch up before Malcolm heads back on the road.

In early 2026, Malcolm returns to Genoa City, where he reveals to Lily he has been diagnosed with aplastic anemia. When trying to find a donor, he finds out from his ex-girlfriend, Stephanie Simmons, that they have a son together, Holden Novak.

== Reception ==
Malcolm quickly won popularity with both viewers and critics as did Moore himself. He was nominated for the Daytime Emmy Award for Outstanding Supporting Actor in a Drama Series three times in 1996, 1997, and 2000, winning in the latter year.

Charlie Mason from Soaps She Knows placed the recasting of Malcolm on his list of the worst soap opera recasts of all time, saying "Don't blame Darius McCrary for this recast's failure — the guy's a fine actor who brought a cool edge to the role of Malcolm. Unfortunately, predecessor Shemar Moore had been so extraordinarily popular in the part that no way, no how were viewers going to accept anybody else playing it. In fact, after McCrary's two-year stint ended, Moore came back for not one but two visits." In 2022, Mason also placed Malcolm 14th on his list of the best 25 characters from The Young and the Restless.
