= Sean Dominic =

Spanish-born American television actor

- Born: Sean Dominic Martin; Madrid, Spain
- Occupation: Television actor

Sean Dominic Martin is a Spanish-born American television actor. He is best known for playing the recurring role of recording producer Martin Jabari Johnson in the American mystery series Greenleaf. Since 2019, he has played Nate Hastings in the CBS soap opera television series The Young and the Restless, for which he received a Daytime Emmy Award nomination for Outstanding Supporting Actor in a Drama Series in 2026.

== Early life ==
Dominic was born in Madrid. As a child, he was a dancer, singer and a performer in stage plays. He began his acting career in a commercial in Atlanta, Georgia, and New York. He earned his first credited television appearance in the USA Network comedy-drama television series Royal Pains in 2009. He also held recurring roles in Greenleaf, Situationships (as Damian) and Makeup X Breakup (as Victor Parish).

In 2018, Dominic starred as Clarence in the film Running Out Of Time, starring along with Tasha Smith and RonReaco Lee. In 2019, he was cast as Nate Hastings in the CBS soap opera television series The Young and the Restless, replacing Brooks Darnell.

== Awards and nominations ==
List of awards and nominations
Year	Award	Category	Work	Result	Ref.
2026	Daytime Emmy Award	Outstanding Supporting Actor in a Drama Series	The Young and the Restless	Nominated	
