= A Doggone Hollywood =

- Directed by: Jim Wynorski
- Written by: Jim Wynorski
- Produced by: Chuck Cirino
- Starring: Paul Logan
- Cinematography: Chuck Cirino
- Music by: Chuck Cirino
- Release date: June 6, 2017
- Running time: 84 minutes
- Country: USA
- Language: English

A Doggone Hollywood is a 2017 American children's film about a telepathic dog starring Jesse the Jack Russell, a dog who was a YouTube star. It is the sequel to the 2016 film A Doggone Christmas and is followed by the sequel A Doggone Adventure.

== Plot ==
Murphy ("Just Jesse the Jack") is a mega-famous canine TV star who is fed up with being treated like a 'cashmachine' by Hollywood executives. He escapes and a group of loving kids save him.

== Cast ==
- Paul Logan as Dirk Stevens
- Jesse the Jack Russell Terrier as Murphy

== See also ==
- List of American films of 2017
