= Lauren Walsh (actress) =

American film actress

Lauren Walsh is an American film actress best known for her roles in films such as 18 Year Old Virgin and Meet the Spartans. Her debut came in a Jason J. Gray short entitled At Day's End. In 2008-2009 she starred in Aaron James Sorensen movie Campus Radio.

== Filmography ==
=== Film ===
Year	Title	Role	Notes
2006	At Day's End	Coke Girl	Short film
2008	Meet the Spartans	Pretty Girl	
2009	18-Year-Old Virgin	Rose	Video
2009	The Grind	Brooke	
2009	The Terminators	Chloe	
2011	The New Republic	Nikki	
2011	Campus Radio	Tommy	
2015	Breath of Hate	Love	

=== Television ===
Year	Title	Role	Notes
2007	Comedy Central Thanpxgiveaway Wikend: 'Ving Break	Wingman Girl	TV movie
2010	Squatters	I Hate Jersey Girl	2 episodes
