= A Doggone Christmas =

- DVD cover
- Directed by: Jim Wynorski
- Written by: Jim Wynorski
- Produced by: Chuck Cirino
- Starring: Dominique Swain
- Cinematography: Chuck Cirino
- Music by: Chuck Cirino
- Release date: November 1, 2016
- Running time: 82 minutes
- Country: United States
- Language: English

A Doggone Christmas is a 2016 American children's film about a telepathic dog. It featured Jesse the Jack Russell Terrier, a dog who is a YouTube star and internet sensation. Well-known for his "useful dog tricks" viral video series on YouTube, he has over 76 million views on YouTube alone. It was followed by the sequel A Doggone Hollywood and A Doggone Adventure.

== Cast ==
- Jaret Sacrey as Agent Sheppard
- Zachary Cirino as The Bartender
- Dominique Swain as Dr. Langley
- Troy Fromin as Agent Don
- Jesse the Jack Russell Terrier as Murphy
- Paul Logan as Cutler
- Rib Hillis as Robert
- Amy Holt as Amy
- Lauren Parkinson as Camilla Sharp

== See also ==
- List of Christmas films
- List of American films of 2016
