= Lange Foundation =

US non-profit organization

The Lange Foundation is a 501(c)(3) non-profit organization founded in 1993 in West Los Angeles, California, by Gillian Lange. The organization is a no-kill shelter committed to rescuing stray and abandoned animals and facilitating adoptions. Animals that are not adopted may remain at the kennel indefinitely without consequence.

Founder Gillian Lange is a recipient of the City of Los Angeles St. Francis of Assisi Award in recognition of her work on behalf of abandoned and neglected animals since 1974. To date, she has helped rescue and place over 20,000 cats and dogs that would have otherwise been destroyed in shelters. The staff at the Lange Foundation have spent the majority of their lives working with animals in a rescue or veterinary setting.

The animals at Lange Foundation are housed in open enclosures, with room to walk, stretch, jump, and play. The cat enclosures include an FIV enclosure for cats that test positive for the virus, a "Weight Watchers" room for overweight cats, and a "Teenville" room for young cats and kittens. There is also an isolation area for newly acquired animals and a kitchen area where sick and injured animals are housed while they recover.

Every animal at Lange Foundation is given a name, microchipped, vaccinated, and sterilized. If an animal is not yet sterilized at the time of adoption, the organization requires proof of sterilization from the adopter at a later date. Funding is provided for those who cannot afford the procedure. The foundation's ultimate goal is to eliminate the need for animal rescue shelters like itself through sterilization. To further this aim, Lange Foundation supports the trap–neuter–return policy, an effort to reduce the number of feral cats in LA county through sterilization.

== Kennel policies ==
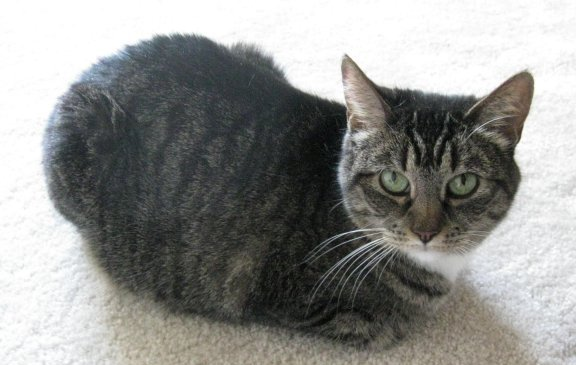
A cat that was adopted from Lange Foundation

=== Kennel Hours ===
The West Los Angeles kennel is open to the public 7 days a week, from 11 am to 5 pm.

=== Adopting ===
Visitors must be 16 years of age to enter the kennel and 21 years old to adopt a pet. The adoption fee for adult cats is $125, kittens are $150. Adult dogs are $250, and puppies are $350. All potential adopters must fill out an application and provide permission from their landlord if living in an apartment. A home check by a Lange representative is required prior to the adoption of a dog. Cats are adopted into indoor homes only. Adopters must reside in LA county.

==== Courtesy listings ====
In addition to the animals up for adoption at Lange foundation, the foundation's website features adoptable animals from other shelters or individuals. These animals are not affiliated with Lange Foundation but are in need of a home nonetheless.

=== Fostering ===
The kennel is often in need of foster homes for animals that do not thrive in a shelter environment and have not yet been adopted. Candidates for foster care include animals that require a special diet due to illnesses like diabetes, FIV+ cats, kittens that must be bottle fed, and old or injured animals that need special attention. Foster care be short-term or long-term, depending on the animal's particular situation.

=== Volunteering ===
Lange foundation accepts volunteers aged 16 and up. A mandatory orientation and volunteer application are required prior to becoming a volunteer. Duties of volunteers include walking dogs, socializing cats, attending adoption events, and helping with the general upkeep of the kennel.

== Myths addressed ==
=== FIV+ cats ===
The FIV+ cats at Lange Foundation are notoriously overlooked by potential adopters. FIV is the acronym for feline immunodeficiency virus and is the feline form of HIV. While many people mistakenly believe FIV is a death sentence, many FIV+ cats actually live long, healthy lives. Lange Foundation tries to dispel the myth that a positive FIV status makes a cat unworthy of adoption.

=== Black cats ===
Often the target of negative superstition, black cats are another group that is frequently overlooked by adopters. In an effort to counter this unfounded discrimination, the Lange Foundation website explains how black cats have often been viewed as sources of good luck throughout history.

== St. Bonnie's sanctuary ==
In addition to the kennel on Sepulveda Boulevard, Lange Foundation has established St. Bonnie's sanctuary, a 4.5-acre (18,000 m^{2}) property located in the community of Canyon Country in Santa Clarita, California. Construction of the sanctuary began on July 30, 2009, and is now complete. While the Lange Foundation kennel only houses dogs and cats, St. Bonnie's sanctuary is home to a cat, several dogs and horses, a donkey, and a pony. Many of the animals at St. Bonnie's sanctuary are up for adoption. Others reside there permanently after many years of being overlooked by potential adopters.

== Television appearances ==
The Lange Foundation has appeared on several television shows:

- On the January 1, 2006 episode of The Oprah Winfrey Show, entitled "Investigating Puppy Mills", the Lange Foundation was praised as an alternative to puppy mills. Winfrey became aware of the organization after her neighbor adopted a dog in Winfrey's name from the Lange Foundation as a Christmas gift. In response, Winfrey donated $10,000 to the foundation.
- On season 1, episode 9 of the Animal Planet show Groomer Has It, contestants groomed dogs from Lange.
- The Lange Foundation was featured in a December 2009 episode of The Bonnie Hunt Show.
