= Every Eye =

- First edition (publ. Andre Deutsch)
- Author: Isobel English
- Language: English
- Publication date: 1956

Every Eye is a 1956 novel by the British author Isobel English. The novel describes the life of a girl who eventually marries a younger man and travels with him to the Spanish island of Ibiza. It is written in both the present and past tense, alternating between the two as Hatty describes her immediate experiences and, as a result, is prompted to revisit memories of her past.

== Reissued ==
English's descriptions of Burnham-on-Sea, Somerset, draw on the time she spent there at La Retrait, a convent school. Every Eye is the second of English's four novels and was republished in 2000 by Persephone Books.

Despite having slated English's first novel The Key that Rusts, John Betjeman, in his 1956 review for The Daily Telegraph, spoke highly of Every Eye, "Sometimes, but not often, a novel comes along which makes the rest one has to review seem commonplace. Such a novel is Every Eye. It is remarkable for the skill of its construction, and for the style of its writing.... This novel is short, but none of it can be skipped."
