= Cameron Davis (Days of Our Lives) =

- Days of Our Lives character
- Portrayed by: Schuyler Yancey (2010–2012); Nathan Owens (2012–2013)
- Duration: 2010–2013
- First appearance: July 22, 2010
- Last appearance: November 8, 2013
- Created by: Marlene Clark Poulter and Darrell Ray Thomas Jr.
- Introduced by: Ken Corday, Lisa de Cazotte and Greg Meng
In-universe information
- Other names: Bryan
- Occupation: Physician
- Mother: Celeste Perrault
- Half-sisters: Lexie Carver
- Aunts: Grace Brooks
- Nephews: Theo Carver
- First cousins: Grace Jeffries

Cameron Davis is a fictional character from the daytime soap opera, Days of Our Lives, portrayed by Nathan Owens. The character was created by then head writers Marlene McPherson and Darrell Ray Thomas, Jr. He started appearing in 2010 and was introduced under executive producers, Lisa De Cazotte and Greg Meng in 2012 as the previously unmentioned son of Celeste Perrault, and younger half-brother of Lexie Carver. The role was originated by Schuyler Yancey, but was recast with Owens, who debuted in late 2012. In addition to joining the staff at the local hospital, Cameron is also a romantic interest for Abigail Deveraux and romantic rival of her ex-boyfriend, Chad DiMera. Cameron's most controversial storyline involved the character's secret life, moonlighting as a male stripper to help his mother make ends meet and to pay back student loans. In late 2013, the character was written out of the series.

== Creation ==
=== Background ===
Schuyler Yancey gave some background on the character in an interview where he revealed that Cameron is taken away from Celeste at the age of 5, and raised by [yet to be named] father. Cameron longs for a familial connection because his father kept him away in boarding schools, so he grew very lonely. Upon the character's introduction, he and Celeste have recently reconnected. Initial speculation point to Lexie's father, Stefano DiMera (Joseph Mascolo). Schuyler Yancey revealed in an interview that his original uncredited role as Bryan, the bartender at The Brady Pub which began airing on July 22, 2010, and appears on a recurring basis until September 2011 was retconned into the role of Cameron.

=== Casting ===
In February 2012, Schuyler Yancey was cast in the role of Cameron Davis. Yancey made his debut on the April 5, 2012 episode. Supermodel, turned actor, known for his appearance as Rihanna's love interest the California King Bed music video, Nathan Owens began taping the role in late September, in secret. On October 1, 2012, several sources, including Soap Opera Digest confirmed that Owens had joined the cast. Owens was spotted on set for the show's 12, 000th episode during a press conference. However, the producers refused to comment on the role Owens would be playing. The actor himself later confirmed through his own personal Facebook that he had been cast in the role of Cameron. Owens's Instagram message about the casting was believed to be an accident. Soaps In Depth later confirmed that Owens would make his first appearance on the December 21 as a replacement for Yancey. However, due to news coverage of the Sandy Hook Elementary School shooting, Davis first air date was postponed to December 24, 2012. Owens found out about the role through his manager. In an interview, Owens revealed that he went out for the role of Rodney. He worked with casting director, Marnie Saitta and went through several tests. Owens admitted that he had a good feeling about the casting because he was given several opportunities to go over the material. Saitta called him back shortly after his test and told Owens to come back in a few days. He went back and forth a few times before he met with the producers and tested with Kate Mansi who portrayed Abigail. Owens signed on to play Cameron and beat out 15 other actors for the role. Owens admitted to being hesitant about replacing someone, though Yancey was only in the role for a short period of time, people had already gotten used to him, and Owens said that he felt like he was under a magnifying glass when he started, and that the potential critics made him a bit nervous. On September 21, 2013, at Kate Mansi's birthday party, Owens announced his departure from the series and revealed that he would last air in November.

== Development ==
Soap Opera Digest revealed that Yancey's Cameron would play a key role in the upcoming storyline featuring Celeste Perrault (Beverly Todd) and Lexie Carver (Renée Jones). According to Owens, with the recast, the character of Cameron would develop an edge and bring more excitement; not unstable, just edgier. In an interview with Soapdom.com, Owens revealed that Cameron has issues that need to be explored. The actor explained that the character has "skeletons" in his closet and those secrets will eventually bring him to a breaking point. Owens drew on personal experience to help him prepare for the role as he also faced issues with his family — Cameron has to develop a sense of family and what it means to him because he does not grow up in the "ideal" family. Owens also avoided seeing clips of Yancey's portrayal to make sure he could put his own spin on the character. However, he did take the opportunity to learn more about the cast members and Days as a whole. Cameron wants a relationship with his late sister, Lexie's family, the DiMeras because he longs for familial acceptance, something he did not grow up with. According to Owens, Cameron has strong feelings for Abigail and does not see her ex, Chad DiMera (Casey Jon Deidrick) as an obstacle. Owens revealed that he hoped for the chance to work with the veteran Mascolo as Stefano.

== Storylines ==
Cameron arrives in Salem in April 2012 and bumps into Abigail Deveraux who helps him track down his half-sister, Lexie Carver at the hospital. Cameron is shocked to learn that Lexie has an inoperable brain tumor. Cameron and Abby bump into one another again when he is working the bar at the Brady pub; he explains that he sometimes helps out when they are short staffed; as Cameron and Abby tease one another, they develop an attraction. Lexie's other half-brother, Chad DiMera and his girlfriend, Melanie decide to show Cameron around and he ends up on a double date with Abby where he saves her from choking on popcorn. Meanwhile, Lexie's health continues declining and Cameron promises to spend more time with his nephew Theo before and after Lexie is gone. Celeste notices the growing closeness between Cameron and Abby, and warns Cameron that she will only cause him trouble. Despite Celeste's warnings, the two begin seeing each other and share their first kiss in late May 2012. In June 2012, Abby comforts Cameron when Lexie passes away, much to Celeste's dismay. Instead of going back home, Cameron chooses to relocate to Salem permanently, mainly to stay close to Theo and Abby, despite Celeste warning him against getting involved with her. However, Abby is afraid to get too serious with Cameron believing he will eventually leave town. In early July, Cameron assures her that he is staying in Salem for several reasons, but mainly so they can be together. Cameron supports Abby when her father Jack suddenly dies. During her grief, Abby struggles with her emotions and has trouble being intimate with him. Realizing Abby needs to get help before their relationship can go any further, Cameron breaks up with her. During the holidays, Cameron and Chad bond over their memories of Lexie. Cameron later rekindles his relationship with Abby but when she admits to him that she has feelings for her ex Chad, he gives her time to choose between them, just as they both compete for Abigail's affection. On 9 August 2013, after doing a test on Chad, Cameron finds out that Chad has a brain tumor, he requests Cameron to keep it a secret, to which he agrees. Just as Abigail makes up her choice and is about to choose Cameron, he breaks things off with her and pushes her to Chad's arms.

In September 2013, at the hospital, Maxine tells Cameron she's glad Abigail has someone to lean on with everything she's going through right now. He admits they're just friends and looks deflated. Maxine's sorry she assumed. He leaves. She can tell he's got it bad for Abby. In the square Gabi walks by, she drops her books and Cameron sees. He helps pick them up. Nick walks over, picks up Gabi's bag and hands it to Cameron saying "You missed one." It's awkward. He leaves and goes back to the hospital and texts Chad. They need to talk. Maxine tells Cam to find Gabi in the waiting room. She has questions about her brother's therapy. Cameron heads over and overhears Abigail tell Gabi she and Chad 'did it'. He shakes his head and looks upset. Cameron decides to pay Chad a visit and asks how could he lie to Abby and set her up? Chad notices his computer is open to the treatment search and feigns a headache. He closes the laptop as Cam gets him water. Chad apologizes that he had to lose in this situation. Cameron's worried about Abigail's vulnerability. Chad says Abby wanted it and gives him a reason to live. Cameron won't say how he found out but agrees to stay out of it. Chad realizes Cameron loves her. Cameron only says Abby's his friend and he cares for them both before going back to the hospital where he bumps into Abby and they share an awkward moment.

== Reception ==
Nathan Owens's picture message fed into speculation that he was replacing Yancey as Cameron. Fans immediately take to Owens as Cameron with some immediately wanting to know when he would appear shirtless. Greg In Hollywood said that Owens was just another "hunky" reason for viewers to watch Days. Owens revealed that he was worried about the recast because he was unsure of how he would be received. Mark Willows of Soapdom.com described the character as a "man of mystery." In 2024, Lynette Rice from Deadline noted how the character became a "romantic squeeze" for Abigail, and believed that his "most memorable arc" was when he "moonlighted as a male stripper to help pay the bills".
