= Grunt! The Wrestling Movie =

- Theatrical release poster by Loyd
- Directed by: Allan Holzman
- Screenplay by: Roger D. Manning
- Story by: Allan Holzman; Anthony Randel; Lisa Tomei; Barry Zetlin
- Produced by: Don Zormann; Anthony Randel
- Starring: Magic Schwarz; Steven Cepello; Bill Grant; Jeff Dial; Wally George
- Cinematography: Eddie Van Der Enden
- Edited by: Allan Holzman; Barry Zetlin
- Music by: Susan Justin
- Distributed by: New World Pictures
- Release date: November 30, 1985
- Running time: 91 minutes
- Country: United States
- Language: English

Grunt! The Wrestling Movie is a 1985 American sports mockumentary comedy film directed, written, and produced by Allan Holzman. The film follows a documentary crew who sets out to unravel one of professional wrestling's most closely guarded secrets.

== Synopsis ==
A documentary crew sets out to unravel one of professional wrestling's most closely guarded secrets: is former champion "Mad Dog" Joe DeCurso now wrestling as The Mask?

== Cast ==
- Magic Schwarz as Mad Dog Joe DeCurso
- Steve Cepello as The Mask
- Bill Grant as Captain Carnage
- Jeff Dial as Lesley Uggams

Additionally, Wally George makes a guest appearance in the film.

== Production ==
The production for Grunt! The Wrestling Movie began on July 1985.

== Reception ==
Gary Trollinger wrote: "Grunt! The Wrestling Movie is a film that sometimes successfully kids the very sleaziness of its subject, but then can't keep its smile on straight".
