= The Quiet Jungle =

Canadian garage rock band

- Promotional photo from 1966.

Background information
- Also known as: The Secrets
- Origin: Toronto, Ontario, Canada
- Genres: Garage rock; psychedelic rock; pop rock
- Years active: 1965–1968
- Labels: Canada International; Arc; Yorkville
- Past members: Doug Rankine; Bob Mark; Henry S. Thaler; Mike Woodroffe; Rick Felstead

The Quiet Jungle was a Canadian garage rock band formed in Toronto, Ontario, in 1965. At the beginning of the group's recording career, they achieved success with pop and novelty songs. In addition, the band recorded cover albums for Arc Records before venturing into early elements of psychedelic rock with their best-known single "Ship of Dreams" in 1967. The Quiet Jungle released one more single later in the year before disbanding; however, more recordings are rumored to exist.

== History ==
Late in 1965, the band started out as the house act at the Pressmen's Club, performing under the name the Secrets, with a line-up which featured Doug Rankine (lead vocals, rhythm guitar), Bob Mark (lead guitar), Henry S. Thaler (electric piano), Mike Woodroffe (bass guitar), and Rick Felstead (drums). Hockey Night in Canada announcer Brian McFarlane approached the Secrets with a proposal, in early 1966, to record a novelty song he had composed for Toronto Maple Leafs player Eddie Shack, who was enjoying a breakout season at the time. Titled "Clear the Track, Here Comes Shack", the single, backed by the lesser-known "Warming the Bench", was a simplistic, but catchy tune which was released on Canada International, and became a huge commercial success on Toronto's CHUM Charts, where it peaked at number one for two weeks. Nationally, the song reached number 56 on the RPM charts. Rankine, who thought the song was a gift specifically for Shack, recalled the circumstances surrounding its release: "We didn’t know it was going to be released as a single and played across the entire country. Once it was released, we thought (or hoped) it would just disappear into the night and nobody would care about it. As fate would have it, it didn’t disappear. For some reason people loved it".

Despite the success of "Clear the Track, Here Comes Shack", the song was an artistic embarrassment for the Secrets, who desired to maintain a hip image on the coffeehouse and club circuit. The group's follow-up, "Cryin' Over Here" on Arc Records, did not replicate the first single's sales worth; however, it is generally considered to be one of the Secrets' better releases. Mark penned "Cryin' Over Here" and assumed the role as the group's chief songwriter, writing or co-writing the band's next four sides. Eager to distance themselves further from "Clear the Track, Here Comes the Shack", the Secrets adopted the moniker the Quiet Jungle in early 1967. At the tail-end of the band's association with Arc Records, the Quiet Jungle anonymously recorded a cover album devoted to the Monkees' songs called A Little Bit Me, I’m a Believer, She Hangs Out plus 9 other ‘Tail-Hanger’ Favorites, and the children's album The Story of Snoopy's Christmas.

The group released "Ship of Dreams" in February 1967 on Yorkville Records, making the group believe they had finally "turned the corner", and could be considered serious musicians. Exhibiting elements of primitive psychedelia with an eerie opening similar to Fever Tree's "San Francisco Girls (Return of the Native)", "Ship of Dreams" reached number 31 on the CHUM Charts, number 43 on the RPM charts, and was also featured on the Yorkville Evolution compilation album in the same year. However, as Rankine explained, the band could not escape its publicity as the Secrets: "Our bookings increased and we were playing right across Canada. Everyone booking us however, wanted the 'Secrets' to play 'Clear the Track Here Comes Shack' and not the group that just released 'Ship of Dreams'".

For their final release, Yorkville Records issued "Too Much in Love"; reaching number 13 on the RPM "Canadian Hits" charts and is considered the rarest of the Quiet Jungle's catalogue. Thereafter, the group slowly began to disband during 1968: first with Woodroffe leaving then Rankine, who departed after having doubts of being a serviceable singer in the band. More recordings by the group were made; however, only one song, "Four in the Morning", is confirmed to exist in the Arc Records vaults. Over the years, the B-side to the "Ship of Dreams" single, titled "Everything", has become the most commonly reissued song by the Quiet Jungle. It appears on the compilation albums The Midwest Vs. Canada, Volume 2, Psychedelic Disaster Whirl, and An Overdose of Heavy Psych, among others.
