= One Tear at a Time =

Song by Noel
- A-side: "One Tear at a Time"
- B-side: "Lonely for Too Long"
- Released: 1982
- Label: Deep South Records A.G. 706
- Composer: (Noel Haughey)
- Producer: Allen Cash

"One Tear at a Time" aka "One Tear (At a Time)" is a 1982 single by country singer Noel. It was a national hit, registering on the Cash Box Top 100 Country Singles chart and the Billboard Hot Country Singles chart.

== Background ==
Noel recorded "One Tear at a Time" and "Lonely for Too Long". Both songs were released on single, Deep South Records A.G. 706 in 1982. The record was also released in Canada on the Ahed label, cat # AH - 1004.

It was reported in the 11 December issue of Cash Box that during her tour in support of the song, she was at a small club in Florida and was asked to follow a group of nude dancers on stage. She declined to appear. She also had a rule that she wouldn't appear at a club where she couldn't comfortably sing "Amazing Grace".

== Reception ==
It was a Feature Pick in the 30 October issue of Cash Box. With five charting singles behind her, country music magazine Music Row predicted that the single would find its way into the charts. It was also one of the ten singles receiving an honorable mention in the magazine.

== Charts ==
=== Cash Box ===
It debuted at No. 85 in the Cash Box Top 100 Country Singles chart for the week of 20 November. At week five, for the week of 18 December, "One Tear at a Time" peaked at No. 73 on the Top 100 Country Singles chart. It held that position for one more week.

=== Billboard ===
It peaked at No. 90 on the Billboard country chart. It held that position for an additional week.
