= List of horror films of 1995 =

A list of horror films released in 1995.

Title	Director(s)	Cast	Country	Notes	Ref.
Addicted to Murder	Kevin T. Lindenmuth	Mick McCleery, Laura McLauchlin, Sasha Graham	United States		
The Addiction	Abel Ferrara	Lili Taylor, Christopher Walken, Annabella Sciorra, Edie Falco, Kathryn Erbe	United States		
Ang Syota Kong Balikbayan	Pablo Santiago	Fernando Poe Jr., Anjanette Abayari, Maritoni Fernandez, Paquito Diaz	Philippines	Horror comedy	
Blood and Donuts	Holly Dale	Gordon Currie, Justin Louis, Helene Clarkson, David Cronenberg (cameo)	Canada		
Burial of the Rats	Dan Golden	Kevin Alber, Adrienne Barbeau, Eduard Plaxin	Russia; United States	Television Movie; Filmed in Moscow	
Candyman 2: Farewell to the Flesh	Bill Condon	Tony Todd, Kelly Rowan, Timothy Carhart, Veronica Cartwright	United States	Based on a Clive Barker story	
Carnosaur 2	Louis Morneau	John Savage, Cliff De Young, Don Stroud, Arabella Holzbog	United States	Roger Corman executive producer	
Castle Freak	Stuart Gordon	Jeffrey Combs, Jonathan Fuller, Barbara Crampton	United States	Produced by Charles Band; Filmed in Band's castle in Italy	
Children of the Corn 3: Urban Harvest	James D. R. Hickox	Daniel Cerny, Ron Melendez, Michael Ensign, Rance Howard, Charlize Theron	United States	Based on a novel by Stephen King; Released direct-to-video	
Copycat	Jon Amiel	Sigourney Weaver, Dermot Mulroney, Holly Hunter, Harry Connick Jr., Will Patton	United States	Filmed in San Francisco	
Creep	Tim Ritter	Dika Newlin, Joel D. Wynkoop, Lee Pinder, Kathy Willets	United States	Filmed in Florida	
The Day of the Beast	Álex de la Iglesia	Alex Angulo, Maria Gracia Cucinotta, Santiago Segura, Armando De Razza	Spain, Italy		
Demon Knight	Ernest R. Dickerson	Billy Zane, Bill Sadler, Jada Pinkett Smith, William Sadler, Dick Miller, John Larroquette, The Crypt Keeper	United States	Based on the Tales From the Crypt comic book series from E.C. Comics	
Eko Eko Azarak: Wizard of Darkness	Shimako Sato	Miho Kanno, Ryôka Yuzuki, Kimika Yoshino, Miho Tamura, Kanori Kadomatsu	Japan	Based on the Manga comic book by Shinichi Koga	
Embrace of the Vampire	Anne Goursaud	Alyssa Milano, Martin Kemp, Jennifer Tilly, Harold Pruett	United States	Filmed in Faribault, Minnesota	
The Fear	Vincent Robert	Anne Turkel, Eddie Bowz, Wes Craven, Heather Medway, Vince Edwards, Darin Heames	United States		
Freakshow	Paul Talbot, William Cooke	Jasi Cotton Lanier, Gunnar Hanson, Shannon Michelle Parsons, Rand Courtney, Brian Kelly	United States	Horror Anthology filmed in South Carolina	
Frostbiter: Wrath of the Wendigo	Tom Chaney	Ron Asheton, Lori Baker, Devlin Burton	United States	Filmed in Michigan	
Gakkō no Kaidan (a.k.a. School Ghost Stories)	Hideyuki Hirayama	Kasumi Toyama, Shiori Yonezawa, Hajime Atsuta, Junichiro Tsukada	Japan	Distributed by Toho	
Halloween: The Curse of Michael Myers	Joe Chappelle	Donald Pleasence, Mitchell Ryan, Marianne Hagan	United States		
Haunted	Lewis Gilbert	Aidan Quinn, Kate Beckinsale, Anthony Andrews	United Kingdom		
The Haunting of Helen Walker	Tom McLoughlin	Aled Roberts, Valerie Bertinelli, Diana Rigg	United Kingdom		
The Howling: New Moon Rising	Clive Turner	Elizabeth Shé, Ernest Kester, Bonnie Lagassa	United States		
Huntress: Spirit of the Night	Mark S. Manos	Jenna Bodnar, Blair Valk, Diana Marcu	Romania; United States		
Ice Cream Man	Norman Apstein	Clint Howard, Olivia Hussey, David Naughton	United States		
Jack-O	Steve Latshaw	Linnea Quigley, Maddisen Krown, Gary Doles	United States		
Leprechaun 3	Brian Trenchard-Smith	Warwick Davis, Marcelo Tubert, Leigh Allyn Baker	United States		
Lord of Illusions	Clive Barker	Scott Bakula, Kevin J. O'Connor, Famke Janssen	United States		
The Mangler	Tobe Hooper	Sean Taylor, Larry Taylor, Ron Smerczak	United States		
Mosquito	Gary Jones	Gunnar Hansen, Ron Asheton, Steve Dixon	United States		
Mutant Species	David A. Prior	Ted Prior, Denise Crosby, Jack Forcinito	United States		
Night of the Scarecrow	Jeff Burr	John La Zar, John Hawkes, Gary Lockwood	United States		
Patayin sa Sindak si Barbara	Chito S. Roño	Lorna Tolentino, Dawn Zulueta, Tonton Gutierrez, Antoinette Taus	Philippines		
Piranha	Scott P. Levy	William Katt, Alexandra Paul	United States	Television film	
The Prophecy	Gregory Widen	Christopher Walken, Elias Koteas, Eric Stoltz	United States		
Romano Sagrado: Talim sa dilim	Rogelio Salvador	Monsour Del Rosario, Edu Manzano, Alma Concepcion, John Estrada, Dindo Arroyo	Philippines		
Serpent's Lair	Jeffrey Reiner	Jeff Fahey, Heather Medway, Anthony Palermo	United States		
Species	Roger Donaldson	Natasha Henstridge, Ben Kingsley, Michael Madsen	United States		
Tales from the Hood	Rusty Cundieff	Clarence Williams III, Joe Torry, Corbin Bernsen	United States		
Texas Chainsaw Massacre: The Next Generation	Kim Henkel	Renée Zellweger, Matthew McConaughey, Robert Jacks	United States		
Tokyo Fist	Shinya Tsukamoto	Shinya Tsukamoto, Kaori Fujii, Kohji Tsukamoto	Japan		
Vampire in Brooklyn	Wes Craven	Eddie Murphy, Angela Bassett, Allen Payne	United States		
Village of the Damned	John Carpenter	Christopher Reeve, Kirstie Alley, Linda Kozlowski	United States		
Visitors of the Night	Jorge Montesi	Markie Post, Pam Hyatt, Melyssa Ade	United States		
The Wasp Woman	Jim Wynorski	Doug Wert, Fred Olen Ray, Jennifer Rubin	United States		
Witchboard III: The Possession	Peter Svatek	David Nerman, Elizabeth Lambert	United States		
Witchcraft VII: Judgement Hour	Michael Paul Girard	Kimberly Blair, Jack Valan, Alisa Christensen	United States		
Xtro 3: Watch the Skies	Harry Bromley Davenport	Sal Landi, Andrew Divoff, Robert Culp	United States		

== Sources ==
- Muir, John Kenneth (2011). Horror Films of the 1990s. Jefferson, North Carolina: McFarland. ISBN 978-0-786-48480-5.
- Young, R. G. (2000). The Encyclopedia of Fantastic Film: Ali Baba to Zombies. Hal Leonard Corporation. ISBN 1-55783-269-2.
