= Fever tree (disambiguation) =

Vachellia xanthophloea, native to eastern and southern Africa

Fever tree may also refer to:

== Other plants ==
- Pinckneya pubens, commonly known as the fevertree or Georgia bark, native to the southern United States
- Anthocleista grandiflora or forest fever tree, native to upland areas in eastern Africa
- Cinchona, a genus of flowering plant native to South America, the bark of which is used for medicinal purposes

== Other uses ==
- Fever Tree (band), a 1960s psychedelic rock band
  - Fever Tree (album), the band's debut album
- Fever-Tree, a producer of drink mixers
- The Fever Tree, a collection of short stories by British author Ruth Rendell
