= Steve Latshaw =

American film producer

- Born: 13 August 1959 (age 66); Decatur, Illinois, USA
- Occupations: Film producer, director, writer
- Years active: 1990s, 2000s, 2010s, ?

Steve Latshaw (b. 1959) is an American screenwriter, producer and director. He has written a number of films for Jim Wynorski and Fred Olen Ray.

== Background ==
He began his career working in television. He started making films with Fred Olen Ray in Florida. He moved to Hollywood in 1995.

Latshaw is the author and director of various horror and B movies. He has also occasionally appeared in films he worked on, for minor roles or cameos.

== Career ==
Latshaw directed the 1998 horror film, Death Mask which was written by James Best who also starred in the main role. The film also starred Linnea Quigley, John Nutten, Cynthia Beckert, Coni Causey, Diane Cantrell and Robin Krasny.

Latshaw wrote the story for the 2000 film Extreme Limits which was directed by Jim Wynorski. This was repeated again for the 2001 film, Ablaze which was directed by Jim Wynorski and starred John Bradley, Tom Arnold, Ice-T, and Michael Dudikoff. In a review of the film, The Schlock Pit said that the film was anchored by a great script.

In 2023, Latshaw was working on Corriganville, a TV series project whose filming was to take place at Corriganville Movie Ranch.

== Selected filmography ==
- Dark Universe (1993)
- Biohazard: The Alien Force (1994) - writer, producer
- Jack-O (1995) - director, co-producer
- Death Mask (1998) - director
- Crash Point Zero (2001) - writer
- Gale Force (2001) - writer
- Return of the Killer Shrews (2012) - writer, director
