= Noel (country singer) =

American country singer

- Also known as: Noel Cash
- Born: Noel Haughey
- Genres: Country
- Occupations: Singer, songwriter
- Instrument: Voice
- Years active: 1980s
- Labels: Super Productions, Deep South Records, Ahed
- Spouse: Allen Cash

Noel (born Noel Haughey) is a Nashville-based country singer and song writer who was active during the 1980s. Her hits include "Lovin' the Night Away", "Lying Myself to Sleep", "Time and Time Again"and "One Tear at a Time".

== Background ==
Noel spent her early life from the West Coast and heard about opportunities in Nashville, Tennessee. Having relocated to Nashville, she came into contact with producer Allen Cash after attending an audition for backing singers. It was Cash who convinced her that she had what it took to be a singer in her own right and it was a better bet than being a backing singer.

By November 1982, Noel already had five singles that had registered in the charts. She was the first artist that was signed to the Deep South Records label.

She married Allen Cash on Valentine's Day 1982. Singer Ron Blair performed at their wedding.

== Career ==
Noel recorded "Lucky Me" which was released on Super Productions SP 642 in 1981. It was reviewed in the 21 March issue of Cash Box. The reviewer wrote that she had a clear, fresh voice that was not unlike Anne Murray and she wasn't afraid to experiment with her vocals. The reviewer also wrote that while the single showed great potential, she could really shine with material that was a little stronger. It debuted at No. 98 in the Cash Box Top 100 Country chart for the week of 18 April. At week three (2 May), it peaked at No. 91 and held that position for one more week.

Not to be confused with the Dillman Band single "Lovin' the Night Away" that was a hit for the band earlier that year, she recorded her own composition of the same name. It was released on Super Productions S.P. 657. It was a Cash Box Country Feature Pick for the week of 13 June. It was also reviewed in the 20 June 1981 issue of Record World. The reviewer wrote that she was a talented song writer and the song was a "breezy, pop-influenced tune with a rangy melody, active strings, and a crisp beat". The song was a chart hit and spent four weeks on the Cash Box Country chart, peaking at No. 88.

She wrote the song "Beautiful Lady which Steve Snyder recorded and was released on Super Productions 647. It was a recommended single in the Top Single Picks section of the 20 June 1981 issue of Billboard.

She wrote "Happy Love Songs" which she recorded with Allen Cash producing. It was released on Super Productions S. P. 667 in 1981. Her single debuted at No. 88 in the Cash Box Top 100 Country Singles chart for the week of 5 December 1981. It was also at No. 10 on the Most Added Country Singles chart with 14 adds. At week five, it peaked at No. 76 on the Top 100 Country chart for the week of 9 January. It stayed on the chart for one more week.

By February 1982 her single, "Lying Myself to Sleep" had been released on Deep South A.G. 681. It was a Country Feature Pick in the 27 February issue of Cash Box. It was also one of the seven recommended country singles by Billboard for that week. For the week of 3 April, it was at No. 8 on the Cash Box Most Added Country Singles chart with 15 adds. It also debuted at No. 83 in the Cash Box Top 100 Country Singles chart that week. At week four, for the week of 24 April, it peaked at No. 78. It held that position for an additional week.

Her single "Apartment #9 debuted at No. 98 on the Cash Box Top 100 Country Singles chart for the week of 29 May 1982. It was active on the chart for four weeks, peaking at No. 90.

=== Writing for Coni Causey ===
She wrote the song "Belle of the Ball" for Coni Causey. Backed with "I Wish There Was Another Woman", it was released on Deep South Records in September/October 1982. It was "I Wish There Was Another Woman" that attracted attention and debuted at No. 94 in the Cash Box Top 100 Country Singles chart for the week of 6 November. It peaked at No. 92 for the week of 13 November and held that position for an additional week.

Causey would release another single, "Weekend Rendezvous" bw "Hellfire and Brimstone". It was a hit the following year, peaking at No. 79 on the Cash Box Top 100 Country Singles chart.

=== "One Tear at a Time" ===
By Late 1982, Noel's single "One Tear at a Time" was out on Deep South A.G. 706. It was a Feature Pick in the 30 October issue of Cash Box. It was also one of the eleven recommended country records in the Billboard Top Single Picks the following week. It debuted at No. 85 in the Cash Box Top 100 Singles chart for the week of 20 November. The single was also released in Canada on the Ahed label.

It was reported in the 11 December issue of Cash Box that while she was touring in support of the song, she was at a small Florida club and was asked to follow a group of nude dancers on stage. She declined to appear. She also had a rule that she wouldn't appear at a club where she couldn't comfortably sing "Amazing Grace".

At week five, for the week of 18 December, "One Tear at a Time" peaked at No. 73 on the Top 100 Country Singles chart. It held that position for one more week. It also peaked at No. 90 on the Billboard Country chart.

=== Further activities ===
She recorded the single "L-L-L-L, Love You All Night" which was released on Deep South DS-1003 in 1983. It debuted at No. 98 on the Cash Box Top 100 Country Singles chart for the week of 20 August 1983. Having been in the chart for five weeks, it peaked at No. 94 for the week of 17 September. It held that position for one more week.

She recorded her composition "Someone I Used to Know" which was released on Deep South 1004. The song which ran at 4:01 was one of the ten Feature Picks in the 29 October 1983 issue of Cash Box.

In 1985, she had a chart hit with "P.S.". It peaked at No. 86 on the Billboard Country chart.

=== "Time and Time Again" ===
Now billed as Noel Cash, her single "Time and Time Again (Ode to Grandpa)" bw "What I Really, Really Want" was released on Deep South Records DSR-1112 in 1987. Both sides were written by her. Along with releases by Marcia Lynn and Kenny Blair, it was one of the three Cash Box Indie Feature Picks for the week of 14 November. The review was positive for not only the meaning of it but also the way it was constructed and written very well. The reviewer finished off with writing that it should prove very popular. Two weeks later, it was at the top on the Cash Box Country Indies New and Active chart with 25 adds.

For the week of 5 December, it had debuted at No. 18 in the Cash Box Indies chart, and at No. 79 in the Cash Box Country Singles chart. At week four for the week of 26 December, it peaked at No. 65. It held that position until the week of 23 January 1988.

The single also made the Country Songwriter's Page Top Indie Label National Chart Songs chart. It was at No. 18 for the week of 5 December. It peaked at No. 6 for the week of 26 December. It was still at No. 6 for the week of 16 January 1988.

=== Further activities ===
As Noel Cash, she recorded "I Believe in You". For the week of 22 August, the single was at No. 18 in the Cash Box Indie Top 20 chart, and had debuted at No. 82 in the Cash Box Country Singles chart. The single also made the Top Independent Country Singles chart. For the survey period ending August 25, 1987, it was at No. 25.
