= Death Mask (film) =

- Directed by: Steve Latshaw
- Written by: James Best
- Produced by: Janeen Best
- Starring: James Best; Linnea Quigley; John Nutten; Brigitte Hill; Diane Cantrell
- Cinematography: Maxwell J. Beck
- Edited by: Pete Opotowsky
- Music by: Michael Parnell
- Release date: 1998
- Running time: 87 mins
- Country: United States

Death Mask is a 1998 horror film directed by Steve Latshaw. It stars James Best, Linnea Quigley, John Nutten, Brigitte Hill and Diane Cantrell.

== Background ==
Death Mask was released in 1998. It was directed by Steve Latshaw with assistance from Bently Tittle. The cinematographer was Maxwell J. Beck. It was produced by Janeen Damian. Dorothy Best was the executive producer. James Best who stars in the film also wrote the script for it.

Some years later in an interview, James Best said he liked the film, but his wife didn't and it was the type of film she didn't want to be associated with.

== Synopsis ==
A carnival worker's face is badly burned. He makes a mask to cover his face which causes people to commit suicide.

== Reception ==
The film was reviewed by Joseph O'Brien in the May / June 2001 issue of Rue Morgue. He wrote that while the film was no classic there was a decent attempt and it harkened back to the days of H.G. Lewis.

The film was also reviewed in issue #34 of Psychotronic Video. The reviewer wrote that James Best and Linnea Quigley who wasn't bad in the film, tried their best with the mediocre material.

Matthew Liedke's review was positive, and he finished off with "the execution isn’t fantastic here, but there’s a commendable earnestness at play".

The review on the Weird Wild Realm website had the film as passable and finished off by saying that there was a certain charm in films by people lacking in talent and having little budget.

In the book Bleeding Skull, Best's performance is referred to as arresting.

The Bands About Movies review was published on 31 October 2021. The reviewer wrote that the film existed in a strange dimension.

== Cast ==
- James Best - Wilbur
- Linnea Quigley - Angel
- John Nutten - Guido
- Brigitte Hill - Zerenda the Swamp Lady
- Diane Cantrell - Dawn
- Robin Krasny - Louise
- Cynthia Beckert - Cindy
- Lorilyn Alexander - Hattie the Fortune Teller
- Coni Causey - Madam Rose
- Mela Levin - Lavern
- Tracy Tepper - Mandy
- Tom Ferguson - Clown, Wilbur's Father
- Tommy Gerard - Critic
- Rob Wishon - Critic's Friend
- Mike Gaughn - Detective
- Bill Roberts - Policeman
- Gersh Morningstar - Baker
- Jim Borda - Bartender
- Jonathan Osteen - Young Wilbur
- Ahmet Bedizel - Strongman

== Releases ==
The film was released on DVD in 2000 through MTI Home Video. It contains trailers, deleted scenes, and a documentary about the making of the film.
