= Jack-O =

1995 American horror film by Steve Latshaw

- DVD cover
- Directed by: Steve Latshaw
- Written by: Brad Linaweaver; Patrick Moran; Lee Shapiro
- Produced by: Steve Latshaw; Patrick Moran
- Starring: Linnea Quigley; Maddisen Krown; Gary Doles; Ryan Latshaw; Katy Maznicki
- Music by: Jeffrey Walton
- Distributed by: Triboro Entertainment Group; Royal Oaks Entertainment
- Release date: October 10, 1995
- Running time: 88 minutes
- Country: United States
- Language: English

Jack-O a 1995 American horror film directed and co-produced by Steve Latshaw and executive produced by Fred Olen Ray. It is the third collaboration between Latshaw as director and Ray as executive producer, following 1993's Dark Universe and 1994's Biohazard: The Alien Force.

Jack-O stars Linnea Quigley, Maddisen K. Krown, Gary Doles, Ryan Latshaw and Catherine Walsh, with cameo appearances by John Carradine, Cameron Mitchell (both posthumous appearances) and Brinke Stevens. The film was released direct-to-video.

== Plot ==
The Kelly family lives in the fictional town of Oakmoor Crossing, just before and during Halloween. The family, consisting of father David, mother Linda, and son Sean, live a normal suburban life, but are eventually visited by a stranger who identifies herself as Vivian Machen. Both the Machens and the Kellys have a long ancestral history in Oakmoor Crossing, and Vivian reveals that one of the Kelly's ancestors hanged a supposed warlock named Walter Machen, who raised up a pumpkinhead scarecrow, named Jack-O, from hell to take revenge on the Kellys. The Kelly ancestor ended up burying the monster in a shallow grave. But, through the antics of several teenagers, Jack-O is raised again and seeks revenge on the Kellys.

== Cast ==
- Patrick Moran as Jack-O-Lantern
- Linnea Quigley as Carolyn Miller
- Maddisen K. Krown as Linda Kelly (credited as Rebecca Wicks)
- Gary Doles as David Kelly
- Ryan Latshaw as Sean/David Kelly
- Catherine Walsh as Vivian Machen
- Rachel Carter as Julie Miller
- Tom Ferda as Jim
- Bill Cross as Richard Watson
- Helen Keeling as Amanda Watson
- Thor Schweigerath as Robbie
- Christina Connell as Sarah
- Mike Conner as Arthur Kelly
- Katy Maznicki as Eunice Kelly
- John Carradine as Walter Machen
- Cameron Mitchell as Dr. Cadaver
- Brinke Stevens as Witch

== Production ==
Jack-O features several notable low-budget film actors. Linnea Quigley plays a prominent role, and both Cameron Mitchell and John Carradine make posthumous cameo appearances.

Director Steve Latshaw had several cast and crew members that joined him on three film projects: Dark Universe (1993), Biohazard: The Alien Force (1994), and Jack-O. Fred Olen Ray served as executive producer for all three films, and Patrick Moran, who played Jack-O, had writing credits on all three as well. Additionally, Wicks and Walsh both appeared in Jack-O and Biohazard: The Alien Force. Latshaw's son, Ryan Latshaw, also appeared in all three films.

== Critical response ==
Jack-O received largely negative reviews. According to a commentary track by Latshaw and Ray, one reviewer referred to the film as a "shit pickle".

J.R. Taylor of Entertainment Weekly gave it a grade of "B", calling it an "entertaining disaster". The film has been unfavorably compared to the 1989 horror film Pumpkinhead, with Taylor writing that Jack-O "may be ripped off from the more atmospheric Pumpkinhead", and author John Kenneth Muir calling Jack-O "a low-budget variation on the much superior" 1989 film. Muir also wrote that, while Jack-O is "undeniably ambitious"—arguing that the film "labors to make a point about political polarization and the culture war in 1990s America" through its conservative suburbanite characters—it contains "virtually no suspense and pretty bad acting too. In execution, the film is pretty indefensible [...] neither particularly scary nor particularly well-made."

== Home media ==
Jack-O was released on VHS. In 2005, the film received a "10th Anniversary Edition" DVD release, which includes such additional content as a commentary by Steve Latshaw and Fred Olen Ray, and footage from a failed Latshaw project titled Gator Babes. The commentary by Latshaw and Ray has been noted for the combativeness between the two, up to and including "a heated argument that results in Latshaw storming out."

== See also ==
- List of films set around Halloween
