= Retroactive Records =

American independent record label

- Founded: 2002
- Founder: Matt Hunt
- Distributors: Brutal Planet Distribution (US); Cargo Twilight (DE); Plastic Head (UK); Season of Mist (FR); Metalzone (Belgium)
- Genre: Christian metal, heavy metal, hard rock, Christian rock
- Country of origin: United States
- Location: Keokuk, Iowa
- Official website: www.retroactiverecords.net

Retroactive Records is an independent record label in Keokuk, Iowa.

The label was founded in 2002 by Matt Hunt, who had previously operated a small label called Magdalene Records. Originally intended to reissue classic Christian metal, the label has since grown to sign new artists, release original albums by those artists, and release other genres of music. They have also started and acquired several smaller labels.

== Artists ==
The following represents a list of bands with albums both released and re-released on Retroactive. Bands with re-releases only on Retroactive are indicated with a †.

- Antestor
- Armaggedon†
- Arnion
- Barnabas†
- Believer†
- Boarders
- Brainchild (Circle of Dust)†
- Bride
- Broken Silence
- Children of the Day†
- Circle of Dust†
- Commissioned
- Daniel Amos†
- Deliverance
- Eloi†
- Emotion
- Encryptor
- Faith Factor
- Fasedown
- Fearful Symmetry
- Final Axe†
- Fires of Babylon
- Grave Robber
- Guardian†
- Haven†
- Heaven's Rage†
- Hero
- His Witness
- Hortor
- Jacob's Dream
- Jommy Hotz
- Jupiter VI
- King James†
- Kreyson
- Liberty n' Justice
- Living Sacrifice with Scott Albert
- Lifesavers Underground, aka LSU
- Lust Control
- Main Line Riders
- MASS†
- Menchen
- Messiah†
- My Silent Wake
- Philadelphia†
- Randy Stonehill†
- Redeemer
- Regime
- Resurrection Band†
- Rev Seven
- Rex Carroll
- Rivera Bomma
- Rosanna's Raiders†
- Saint
- Sardonyx†
- Saviour Machine†
- Servant†
- Seventh Seal
- Siloam†
- SinDizzy
- Six Feet Deep†
- Struggle†
- Stairway†
- Sweet Comfort Band†
- The Lead
- The Rise
- The Seventh Power
- Titanic
- Ulf Christiansson
- Ultimatum
- Vision
- Whitecross
- X-Sinner
- Zion†

== Imprints ==
=== Born Twice Records ===
Among the records that have seen a re-release on the Born Twice label are Shotgun Angel by Daniel Amos on Born Twice Records BTR7783, and the self-titled album by The Exkursions, both in 2011. Christian punk band, the Bill Mason Band had their 1979 No Sham! album re-released that year. Christian rock band Vision recorded their album Streetfighter in 1986. It was never released until Born Twice Records released it in 2011.

=== Others ===
- Bombworks Records
- GospoMusic
- Watergrave Records

== See also ==
- List of record labels
