= The Exkursions (album) =

Studio album by The Exkursions
- Released: 1971
- Genres: Psychedelic rock, acid rock, blues rock, christian rock
- Length: 37:44
- Labels: No label, self-released 811G-2984 Born Twice Records BTW7787 (2011 re-release)

The Exkursions is a 1971 album by Christian psychedelic rock band The Exkursions which was led by Mike Johnson. It was re-released in 2011.

== Background ==
The Exkursions were a Christian band who drew from the heavy rock blues and psychedelic genres. They released just one album in 1971.

Two tracks from the album, "It's Been Sent Down" and "Dry Ground" are included on the various artists Holy Fuzz compilation album.

The album was re-released on the Hidden Vision label in 1998. It was released again in 2011/2012 by Born Twice Records.

In 2023, the record had a re-release in Greece on the Twisted Flowers label.

== Reception ==
The album had an 80% rating by Christian metal and hard rock website Angelic Warlord.

The review by No Life Til Metal was positive with the reviewer speculating that it may have been recorded on a shoestring budget but was surprisingly well-recorded. The reviewer also noted that even though the songs "Would You Believe" and "Third Eye" had obvious evangelical messages, the lyrics of the songs that were on the album weren't overly preachy.

According to The Acid Archives by Patrick Lundborg, Aaroun Milenski and Ron Moore, a few songs on the album have a fuzz sound to die for. The songwriting didn't match the performances, but it was mostly solid hard rock and one of the best in the realm of Christian rock.

The album was positively reviewed by Craig Hartranft of Dangerdog Music Reviews in January 2012. It was given a 4/5 rating.

The 2014 Cross Rhythms review was positive with the reviewer writing that it was full of great things. It was also given a 9/10 rating.

In an article by Scenes Media, "Is Christian Rock As Lousy As The New Yorker Says It Is?" By Marc Smirnoff, a list of albums that the author thought had merit was compiled. The list, "A Top 10 List of Early Christian Rock" had The Exkursions at No. 5.

The 2019 review by 100 Greatest CCM Albums of the '70s was positive with the reviewer writing that it sounded raw but not muddy like other albums of the period. The reviewer also wrote that it was a treasure of fuzz guitar blues licks and the "growly hippy' vocals that are just too cool".

Christian music website Dead to Self Radio gave the album a 5/5 rating.

== Musicians ==
- Mike Johnson – lead vocals & guitars
- Leon Wilson – bass
- Fyl Jonnzen – drums

== Track listing ==
=== A ===
1. "Picture Woman"
2. "Dry Ground"
3. "Baby You Lied
4. "What Happened to Me"

=== B ===
1. "Third Eye"
2. "You & Me"
3. "It's Been Set Down"
4. "Would You Believe"
