= Yorkville Records =

Canadian record label

The "Ship of Dreams" single by the Quiet Jungle. Note the colorful design.

Yorkville Records (self-identified as "Yorkville") was a Canadian record label formed in Toronto in 1966. A few early singles used the name Yorktown on the label. It was a subsidiary of the Arc Sound holding company which was founded by Phil G. Anderson and William R. (Bill) Gilliland in 1958. Another subsidiary record label of the Arc Sound company was Arc Records.

Early releases on Yorktown were recordings by the garage rock band the Ugly Ducklings. This resulted in a string of national hits, including "Nothin'", "10:30 Train", and "She Ain't No Use to Me".

When Yorktown changed its name to Yorkville in late 1966, the company signed more musical artists, first earning a minor hit with the Stitch of Tyme's cover of "Got to Get You into My Life". Yorkville Records is considered the only record company established in Canada to dedicate its efforts specifically on material rooted in the musical genre of psychedelic rock, releasing additional records by the Quiet Jungle, the Sugar Shoppe, and Willapuss, among others.

The David Clayton-Thomas Combine released the single "Father Dear Father" on Yorkville in 1968 just before the lead singer moved to New York City to join the band Blood, Sweat & Tears.

Yorkville released several compilation albums such as Yorkville Evolution and After Four. The label remained active until 1974. The very last single on Yorkville was "Rock My Roll" by Bill Amesbury, which peaked at #94 on the Canadian charts in September 1974.

Music historian Piers A. Hemmingsen attributed the collectibility of Yorkville's catalogue to "The bright colours of the label and the unique collection of artists make this a label that record collectors love".

== Artists ==
- Barbra Amesbury
- Brutus
- Ronnie Hawkins
- Heat Exchange
- Ocean
- The Quiet Jungle
- The Stitch in Tyme
- The Sugar Shoppe
- The Ugly Ducklings
