= Irish folk music (1960–1969) =

This is a list compiling Irish folk songs and Irish artists who produced them, between the years of 1960 and 1969, inclusive.

== Births and deaths ==
=== Births ===
- Enya (1961)
- Ronan Hardiman (1961)
- Michael McGlynn (1964)
- Sinéad O'Connor (1966)
- Susan McKeown (1967)
- Sharon Shannon (1968)

== Recordings ==
- 1961- "Clancy Brothers and Tommy Makem" (The Clancy Brothers & Tommy Makem)
- 1963- 1st Chieftains album
- 1964- "The Dubliners" (Dubliners)
- 1965- "The Bunch of Keys" (Felix Doran)
- 1966- "We're Off to the Dublin Green" (Abbey Tavern Singers)
- 1967- "A Drop of the Hard Stuff" (Dubliners)
- 1968- "Astral Weeks" (Van Morrison)
