= Lying Myself to Sleep =

1982 single by Noel

Song by Noel
- A-side: "Lying Myself to Sleep"
- B-side: "Lonely for Too Long"
- Released: 1982
- Label: Deep South Records A.G. 681
- Composer: (Mitch Johnson)
- Producer: Allen Cash

"Lying Myself to Sleep" is a 1982 single by female country singer Noel. It was a hit for her that year, registering on the Cash Box Top 100 Country Singles chart.

== Background ==
Singer Noel recorded the Mitch Johnson composition "Lying Myself to Sleep" and her own composition "Lonely for Too Long" for the B side. Both songs were on the Deep South Records single, cat No. A.G. 681 which was released in 1982.

It was reported in the 20 February 1982 issue of Billboard that new record company Deep South Records had signed singer Noel and actor Dennis Weaver to the label and released their first single, "Lying Myself to Sleep".

== Reception ==
"Lying Myself to Sleep" was one of the seven recommended country singles by Billboard for the week of 27 February 1982.The single was also a Country Feature Pick for that week by Cash Box,

== Airplay ==
The single entered the Cash Box Most Added Country Singles chart at No. 8 with 15 adds for the week of 3 April 1982.

== Charts ==
It debuted at No. 83 in the Cash Box Top 100 Country Singles chart for the week of 3 April. At week four, for the week of 24 April, it peaked at No. 78. It held that position for an additional week.
