= Mike Johnson (Christian rock musician) =

- Born: Michael Craig Johnson; 11 October 1945
- Origin: United States
- Died: 9 February 2013 (aged 67)
- Cause of death: Cardiac arrest
- Genres: Christian rock
- Occupation: Musician
- Instruments: guitar, vocals
- Labels: Freedom Light Records, CAM, CEP Records, New Pax, Deep South Records, Born Twice Records
- Formerly of: Paul Butterfield Blues Band, The Exkursions, The Second Coming

Mike Johnson was a pioneering Christian rock musician. He was a member of Christian rock bands, The Exkursions and The Second Coming.

== Background ==
Mike Johnson's teenage years were troubled and he dropped out of school. He ended up in the Paul Butterfield Blues Band. After becoming a Christian he formed the heavy rock Christian band, The Exkursions. The band was one of the earliest examples of heavy Christian rock music. The group featured Johnson on lead vocals and guitar, Leon Wilson on bass and Fyl Jonnzen on drums. Their musical influences included Jimi Hendrix and Cream.

Johnson's Christian music career began in 1968 when he and his band, The Exkursions were taken on tour by an Anglican minister from England. They toured, playing at college campuses, clubs and beaches.

In 1970, he set out on his own, playing throughout New England.

During his career, he collaborated with Randy Matthews and Danny Taylor, which resulted in the release of the album, Matthews, Taylor and Johnson.

== Career ==
=== The Exkursions ===
Johnson's group, The Exkursions toured the United States from 1968 to 1970. During that time, they released an album. According to the "Michael Bloomfield Recollections" on the Mike Bloomfield website, it was when Johnson had just started The Exkursions that he was in Chicago and taking a break. He was checking out Wes Montgomery who was playing nearby. He bumped into Mike Bloomfield who he had played with some time prior to The Exkursions. Bloomfield was heading to the West Coast to put together a band. He asked Johnson if he would be his bass player in this band. Johnson declined as he wanted to stay with his new band. The band that Bloomfield was putting together was The Electric Flag.

The Exkursions released their self-titled album in 1971.

According to the Shiloh Worship Music website, the group broke up because two of the members wavered in their faith.

=== Further activities ===
In 1972 Johnson's album, The Last Battle was released on CAM Enterprises CSS 1567. The following year, his Velvet Prince album was released on the Freedom Light record label.

In 1976, Johnson joined Randy Matthews and Danny Taylor to form the trio Matthews, Taylor & Johnson. Also that year, Johnson's album, the Randy Matthews produced The Artist / The Riddle was released. The album resulted in Johnson being selected by Harmony Magazine for an "Artist of the Year" award.

In 1977, Johnson's album, More than Just an Act was released on NewPax NP33043.

Johnson wrote the song, "Little Boy in Denver" which he recorded and co-produced with Allen Cash. It was released on Deep South Records AG 684 in 1982. It was later recorded by another Deep South Artist, Ron Blair. It became a minor chart hit, debuting at No. 96 on the Cash Box Top 100 Country Singles chart for the week of 8 January 1983. It held the position for one more week.

His 1973 album, Velvet Prince was re-released in 2012 on Born Twice Records. It was given a 9/10 rating in a review by Cross Rhythms.

== Death ==
Mike Johnson died on Saturday, 9 February 2013 as a result of a cardiac arrest.
