= Heat Exchange =

Canadian rock band

- Origin: Toronto, Canada
- Years active: 1960s to 1970s
- Labels: Yorkville, Out-Sider
- Past members: Craig Carmody; Neil Chapman; Mike Langford; Gord McKinnon; Marty Morin; Ralph Smith

Heat Exchange was a Canadian rock band who had evolved out of a late 1960s, blues quartet. They had a hit in Canada in 1972 with "Can You Tell Me". Nearly five decades later they would finally have their album released.

== Background ==
They started out as Cloud, a four-man blues group that Neil Chapman had founded in the late 1960s. The lineup then was Neil Chapman on guitar, Marty Morin on Drums, Gord McKinnon on keyboards and Ralph Smith on bass. They later expanded the group by inviting in Craig Carmody on sax and flute and Mike Landford on vocals. Later they had to change their name due to another band with the similar name, The Clouds who had released an album. Thinking that the names were too similar, the name chosen was Heat exchange.

They were almost signed to the RCA label but Yorkville Records gave them a better offer. Subsequently, the group were signed to the label.

== Career ==
=== 1972 ===
In 1972, the group released the single, "Can You Tell Me" bw "Inferno" on Yorkville YVM-45052. By May 6, "Can You Tell Me" had entered the RPM100 Singles chart at #96. By May 27, it had moved down from the previous week's position from #87 to #92.

They followed up with another single, " Scorpio Lady" bw "Reminiscence" on Yorkville YVM-45063.

There was supposed to be an album released that year but in spite of enough material having been recorded, a release deal fell through.

=== 1973 ===
That year they released "She Made Me All Alone" bw "Philosophy " on Yorkville YVM-45069.

== Post Heat Exchange ==
At some stage, Neil Chapman, Mike Langford and Marty Morin had become part of Truck's line up. The December 22 issue of RPM Weekly indicated that they were Truck members along with Jim Chricton and Todd Booth. They had recently appeared at the National Entertainment Conference in November held just outside New York City at Grossinger's and had received backstage compliments from Dave Brubeck, and were appearing at the Abbey Road Pub in Toronto from December 17 through to the 22nd.

== Later years ==
In 2015, Craig Carmody got together Heat Exchange's original recordings. Travelling to Kelowna, he met recording engineer Bob Gablehouse. Gablehouse remastered the album Reminiscence which was released on both CD and vinyl on February 15, 2017.

Around 2021, some of the original members were in the process of getting together via Zoom to talk about what had been taking place for them over the years as well as the celebration of their hit single's anniversary.

== Discography ==
Singles
Act	Release	Catalogue	Year	Notes
Heat Exchange	"Scorpio Lady" / "Reminiscence"	Yorkville YVM-45063	1972	
Heat Exchange	"Can You Tell Me" / "Inferno"	Yorkville YVM-45052	1972	
Heat Exchange	"She Made Me All Alone" / "Philosophy"	Yorkville YVM 45069	1973	

Albums
Act	Release	Catalogue	Year	Notes
Heat Exchange	Reminiscence	Out-Sider OSR060	2017	Vinyl LP
Heat Exchange	Reminiscence	Out-Sider OSR060CD	2017	CD
