= Hortor =

Mexican band

- Origin: Mexico City, Mexico
- Genres: Unblack metal; Christian metal; symphonic metal; Viking metal; extreme metal; black metal; death metal
- Years active: 2004–present
- Labels: Sullen, Exhortmetal Distributions, Bombworks, Eternal, Retroactive
- Members: Varme; Azmaveth
- Website: Hortor on Facebook

Hortor is a Mexican extreme unblack metal band originated in Mexico City, Mexico in March 2004. The band's name translated in English means "Animate". Members have been involved in multiple projects including Freddy Acosta for his solo project, Impaled Baphomet. On one of their full-length albums, they covered a song by one of their unblack metal influences, Horde. The band has released four studio albums, an EP, a split album, a compilation album, and a demo.

== Members ==
Current

- Freddy "Varme" Acosta – guitars (2003–present)
- "Azmaveth" – vocals, guitar (2003–present)
- Christian "Azgad" Razo – guitars, bass guitar (2003–2007, 2017–present)
- "Askenaz" – drums, vocals (2003–2007, 2017–present)
- "Hefzi-ba" – keyboards (2003–2007, 2017–present)

Former

- Izhar – drums (2007–2013)
- Nokturnal Wolf – drums, (2013–2017) bass guitar (2007–2013)
- Absalon – guitars (2007–2013)
- Arfaxad – guitars
- Adunamy – vocals (2006–2007, 2013)

== Discography ==
Demo

- Demo (2004)

EPs

- By the Sword of the Almighty Emperor (2007)

Splits

- Satanas Destronado / Hortor (2008; split w/ Behead Demons)

Studio albums

- Decapitación absoluta al falso profeta (2007)
- Ancient Satanic Rituals Are Crushed in Dust (2009)
- Dios de dioses (2013)
- Dharma Esencia de Impureza (2017)

Compilations

- Enthroned XI (2015)
