= Randy Matthews =

American musician

- Born: May 7, 1950 (age 76)
- Genres: Jesus music, contemporary Christian
- Instrument: Guitar
- Years active: 1971–current
- Labels: Word; Myrrh; Spirit; Refuge

Randy Matthews (born May 7, 1950) is an American Christian singer, songwriter, guitarist, and pioneer of Jesus music.

== Background ==
He was born into a family with at least five ordained ministers, including his father, Monty, a founding member of the Jordanaires. When Matthews was in high school in Lamar, Mo., he sang in a quartet called The Zionaires, which was also founded by his father. This quartet performed regionally and sang in quartet competitions. Other members of the group included Noel Scott, baritone; Spike (Carl) Bickel, tenor; and Dan Fields, bass.

Matthews briefly attended Ozark Bible College in Joplin, Mo. During this time he joined Noel Scott and Charlene Munger in the developing movement of Christian folk music. This experience helped Matthews to choose a less traditional path to ministry. After leaving college, he founded a coffee house ministry in Cincinnati with the purpose of promoting social activities among Christians and providing a safe haven for street people.

== Career ==
In 1971, Matthews was signed as the first contemporary Christian artist to record for Word Records, a gospel label which had, up to that point, released spoken word recordings and albums of traditional gospel music. His first album was Wish We'd All Been Ready. With the release of his second album, All I Am Is What You See, Word launched a new label called Myrrh Records, created specifically to tap into the musical interests of the burgeoning Jesus movement.

Matthews' music and concert style has always pushed the envelope. In 1974, Matthews was invited to perform at The Jesus Festival, a Woodstock type event in which attenders camped out and listened to Christian music and Bible teaching for three days. When Matthews' band took the stage, the promoters and many in the crowd were shocked at their rock and roll presentation; up to this point most contemporary Christian music was more influenced by folk than rock. Matthews' band was unplugged by the promoters and chased off the stage by the concert-goers. Matthews referenced this experience on his fourth album, 1975's Eyes to the Sky, with the track, "Pennsylvania Song": "you pulled the plug and drained my soul, but I know I left a ring around the tub of tradition, I saw some dance and sing" and again in his ninth solo album, titled Plugged In..

In 1976, Matthews joined Danny Taylor and Mike Johnson to form a once-off trio, Matthews, Taylor & Johnson. They released their Matthews, Taylor and Johnson album. Also in 1976, Matthews produced Mike Johnson's The Artist / The Riddle album.

Matthews is currently working under the stage name Red Beard, performing frequently at the Trade Winds Resort in St. Petersburg Beach, Florida and the Palm Island Resort. He recently released an album of pirate songs and tall tales called Red Beard Pirate King.

In 2015 Son of Dust was remastered by Bim Ingersoll at Rockroach Studio, and independently released on CD by Stowaway Music. This was the first time any of Matthews albums from the 1970s was available on CD.

== Discography ==
- Wish We'd All Been Ready (1971)
- All I Am Is What You See... (1972)
- Son of Dust (1973)
- Eyes to the Sky (1975)
- Now Do You Understand (1975) - double live album
- Matthews, Taylor & Johnson (1976)
- The Best of Randy Matthews (1976)
- Live in Australia (1978)
- Randy Matthews (1980)
- Plugged In (1981)
- Streets of Mercy (1987)
- The Edge of Flight (1990)
- Red Beard Pirate King (2008)
