= The Sugar Shoppe =

- Origin: Toronto, Ontario, Canada
- Genre: Sunshine pop
- Years active: 1967–1970
- Labels: Yorkville, Capitol, Epic
- Past members: Peter Mann; Laurie Hood; Victor Garber; Lee Harris

The Sugar Shoppe was a Canadian sunshine pop vocal group that recorded in the 1960s and featured actor Victor Garber. The group was formed in Toronto by songwriter and pianist Peter Mann, and released one self-titled album in 1968.

== History ==
The group was formed in Toronto by lead singer, songwriter and pianist Peter Mann (October 9, 1940 – December 7, 2021). Born in New York City, he grew up in Miami, Florida, before working as an arranger and relocating to Canada in 1965. There, he met University of Toronto School of Music student and singer Laurie Hood, and singers Lee Harris and Victor Garber, an actor and singer who was also studying in Toronto as well as singing in the city's clubs.

With two male singers (Mann and Garber) and two female (Hood and Harris), they modeled themselves on the Mamas & the Papas and began working in the studio on a project to mark the Canadian Centennial in 1967. The group's first single was Mann's arrangement of Bobby Gimby's song "Canada"; released on the Yorkville label, it reached no.40 on the RPM Canadian singles chart. The follow-up, "The Attitude", was less successful, reaching no.77. However, the group won a recording deal with Capitol Records in Los Angeles, and recorded an album, The Sugar Shoppe, released in 1968. It was produced by Al De Lory and arranged by Mort Garson, with session musicians including "The Wrecking Crew" of Hal Blaine, Carol Kaye, Larry Knechtel, Earl Palmer, Mike Deasy, and Plas Johnson. Tracks included versions of Donovan's "Skip-a-Long Sam", which was also released as a single, reaching no. 73 on the Canadian chart; Bobbie Gentry's "Papa, Won’t You Let Me Go to Town"; Mike Leander's theme song for the movie Privilege (#93); and a re-recorded version of "The Attitude". However, despite appearances on both Ed Sullivan's and Johnny Carson's television shows, the group's commercial success was limited.

The Sugar Shoppe then joined Epic Records, and in 1969 released a version of Laura Nyro's "Save the Country", and performed it on the Ed Sullivan Show July 6, 1969, which used an arrangement by Joe Scott and Mann, with some similarity to a later version used by The 5th Dimension. However, it was not a commercial success. The group continued to perform, mainly in Canada, before Mann and Harris left in 1970. Garber and Hood then formed The Shoppe with Sandy Crawley. They recorded the soundtrack for a television series based on Greek mythology in 1971, and recorded several tracks issued on anthologies. By 1973, the group had finally disbanded.

Garber became a leading film, stage and television actor. Mann remained active in recording sessions in Canada, and later worked mainly in television. Mann died at home in Toronto, Ontario, on December 7, 2021, at the age of 81. Hood and Harris later worked as session singers and were both part of another group, Shooter, Myles and Lenny, in the 1970s. Hood was the female singer in Klaatu's "California Jam". Harris developed multiple sclerosis, leading to her death in the 1990s. Lee Harris was the sister of Peter Harris, head of the guitar program at Humber College in Toronto, Ontario, for 22 years until September 1994, when he discovered he had cancer. He died of cancer January 13, 1995, at the age of 49.

The Sugar Shoppe was reissued on CD with bonus tracks by Now Sounds/Cherry Red Records in April 2013.

== Members ==
- Victor Garber
- Peter Mann
- Laurie Hood
- Lee Harris

== Discography ==
=== Singles ===
Year	Song	Canada	US A/C (Easy)	Album
1967	"Canada"	40	-	Non-LP single
1967	"The Attitude"	77	-	Non-LP single, later re-recorded for The Sugar Shoppe
1968	"Skip-A-Long Sam"	73	-	The Sugar Shoppe
1968	A-side: "Privilege"; B-side: "Poor Papa"	93 -	- 31	The Sugar Shoppe
1969	"Save The Country"	-	-	Non-LP single

=== Album ===
The Sugar Shoppe (1968)

=== Other appearances ===
As "Shoppe", five tracks on the 1971 soundtrack LP Dusting Off Mythology, an educational TV series for TVOntario.
