= Eddie Shack =

Canadian ice hockey player (1937–2020)

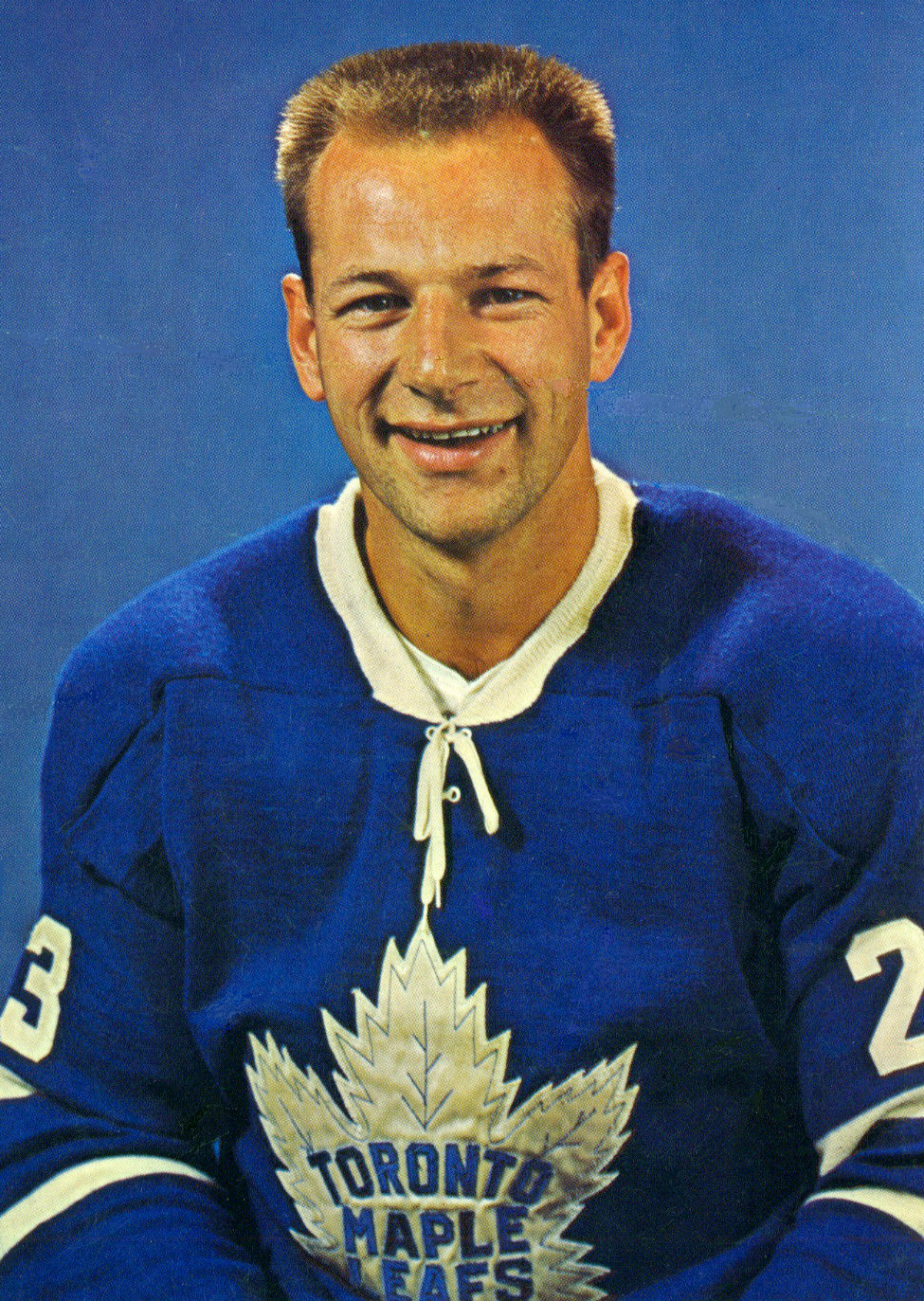
- Shack with the Toronto Maple Leafs in the 1960s
- Born: February 11, 1937 Sudbury, Ontario, Canada
- Died: July 25, 2020 (aged 83) Toronto, Ontario, Canada
- Height: 6 ft 1 in (185 cm)
- Weight: 200 lb (91 kg; 14 st 4 lb)
- Position: Left wing
- Shot: Left
- Played for: New York Rangers; Toronto Maple Leafs; Boston Bruins; Los Angeles Kings; Buffalo Sabres; Pittsburgh Penguins
- Playing career: 1957–1975

Edward Steven Phillip Shack (February 11, 1937 – July 25, 2020), also known by his nicknames "the Entertainer" and "the Nose", was a Canadian professional ice hockey player of Ukrainian descent who played for six National Hockey League (NHL) teams from 1959 to 1975. He spent eight and a half seasons of his career with the Toronto Maple Leafs, with whom he won the Stanley Cup in 1962, 1963, 1964, and 1967.

== Early life ==
Edward Steven Phillip Shack was born in Sudbury, Ontario, on February 11, 1937, the son of Ukrainian immigrants Lena and Bill Shack. He had an elder sister named Mary. As a child, he struggled in school due to illnesses between first and third grade that hampered his attendance. Consequently, he stayed illiterate and eventually dropped out altogether. He began working as a salesman for a butcher shop, but left this job to try out with the Guelph Biltmores hockey club; during his time with them, he supported himself with jobs at a meat market and on a coal truck.

Shack met his wife, Norma Givens, when she worked at the Eaton’s across from the Empress Hotel in Peterborough, Ont., where the team held its training camps. The couple married in 1962 and had two children.

== Playing career ==
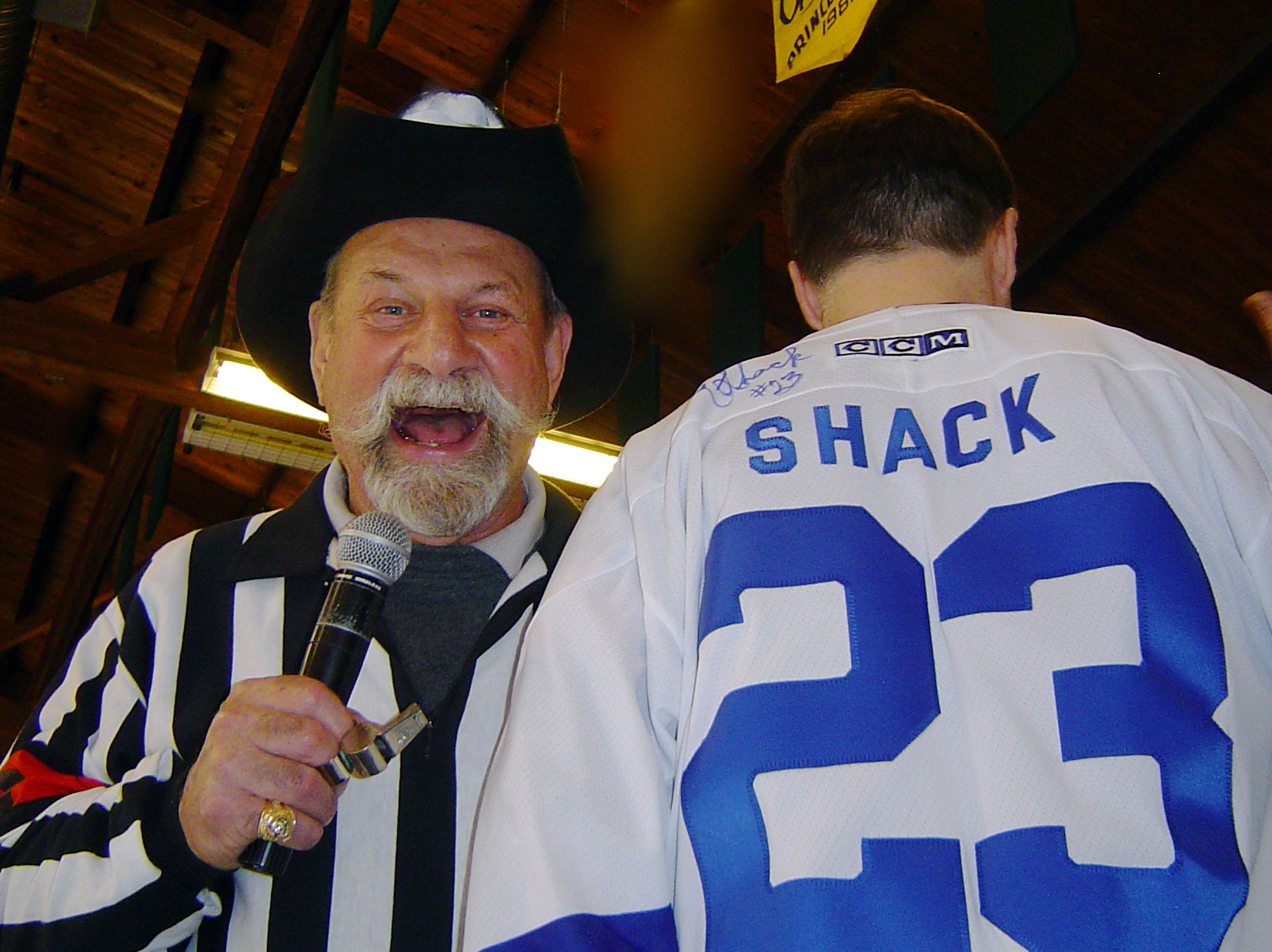
Shack (left) with a fan wearing his jersey (right) at an NHL charity event in January 2007

Shack played junior hockey for the Guelph Biltmores of the OHA for five seasons starting at the age of 15. He had his best season in 1956–57, when he led the league in assists and starred in the Memorial Cup playoffs.

The New York Rangers signed Shack and assigned him to their AHL Providence Reds farm team for half a season. He made the NHL in the 1958–59 season and played two years for the Blueshirts. In 1960, he was to be traded with Bill Gadsby to the Detroit Red Wings for Red Kelly and Billy McNeill, but the transaction was cancelled when Kelly decided to retire rather than accept the trade.

In November of the 1960–61 season, Shack was traded to the Toronto Maple Leafs, where he played seven seasons on the left wing as a colourful, third-line agitator who was popular with the fans despite a lack of scoring prowess. Canadian sports writer Stephen Cole likened Shack's playing to that of "a big puppy let loose in a wide field".

During the 1965–66 season Shack broke out, scoring 26 goals on a line with Ron Ellis and Bob Pulford. His popularity was such that a novelty song called "Clear the Track, Here Comes Shack", written in his honour and performed by Douglas Rankine with The Secrets, reached No. 1 on the CHUM pop chart in Toronto and charted for 9 weeks.

Shack was a member of the Maple Leafs' last Stanley Cup-winning team in 1967, although his production fell significantly and he was traded in May 1967 to the Boston Bruins for Murray Oliver and cash. Playing on the right wing on a line with Derek Sanderson and Ed Westfall, Shack's performance rebounded and he scored 23 goals.

Afflicted by injuries, he spent the next four seasons moving among the Los Angeles Kings, the Buffalo Sabres, and the Pittsburgh Penguins. Although he was never a big scorer or playmaker, he was able to score 20 goals three more times during these years, including a career high of 27 in 1970–71 in 11 games with Los Angeles and 56 games with Buffalo. Pittsburgh sold him back to Toronto for the 1973–74 season. He retired after the 1974–75 season.

== Post-playing career ==
After his retirement, Shack was a popular advertising spokesman in Canada, most notably for The Pop Shoppe soft drinks, Wendy's Hamburgers and Schick razors, shaving off his moustache for one of their promotions. He also promoted a small chain of doughnut stores bearing his name. He appeared for a number of years at alumni all-star games. He also revealed he had been illiterate most of his life and subsequently became an advocate for literacy programs in his native Ontario.

== Death ==
Shack died from throat cancer at a hospital in Toronto on the night of July 25, 2020. He was 83 years old. Shack was survived by his wife of 58 years, Norma Givens and their two children.

== Achievements ==
- Shack won the Stanley Cup in 1962, 1963, 1964, and 1967. He scored the winning goal in 1963, famously claiming that he had scored the goal off his backside and was only trying to get out of the way of the shot.
- He played in the National Hockey League All-Star Game in 1962, 1963, and 1964.

== Career statistics ==
			Regular season					Playoffs
Season	Team	League	GP	G	A	Pts	PIM	GP	G	A	Pts	PIM
1952–53	Guelph Biltmores	OHA-Jr.	21	2	6	8	43	—	—	—	—	—
1953–54	Guelph Biltmores	OHA-Jr.	54	13	9	22	46	1	1	0	1	4
1954–55	Guelph Biltmores	OHA-Jr.	19	6	7	13	35	2	0	0	0	4
1955–56	Guelph Biltmores	OHA-Jr.	48	23	49	72	93	3	1	0	1	10
1956–57	Guelph Biltmores	OHA-Jr.	52	47	57	104	129	10	4	10	14	53
1956–57	Guelph Biltmores	M-Cup	—	—	—	—	—	6	2	2	4	26
1957–58	Providence Reds	AHL	35	16	18	34	98	—	—	—	—	—
1958–59	New York Rangers	NHL	67	7	14	21	109	—	—	—	—	—
1959–60	New York Rangers	NHL	62	8	10	18	110	—	—	—	—	—
1959–60	Springfield Indians	AHL	9	3	4	7	10	—	—	—	—	—
1960–61	New York Rangers	NHL	12	1	2	3	17	—	—	—	—	—
1960–61	Toronto Maple Leafs	NHL	55	14	14	28	90	4	0	0	0	2
1961–62	Toronto Maple Leafs	NHL	44	7	14	21	62	9	0	0	0	18
1962–63	Toronto Maple Leafs	NHL	63	16	9	25	97	10	2	1	3	11
1963–64	Toronto Maple Leafs	NHL	64	11	10	21	128	13	0	1	1	25
1964–65	Toronto Maple Leafs	NHL	67	5	9	14	68	5	1	0	1	8
1965–66	Toronto Maple Leafs	NHL	63	26	17	43	88	4	2	1	3	33
1965–66	Rochester Americans	AHL	8	3	4	7	12	—	—	—	—	—
1966–67	Toronto Maple Leafs	NHL	63	11	14	25	58	8	0	0	0	8
1967–68	Boston Bruins	NHL	70	23	19	42	107	4	0	1	1	6
1968–69	Boston Bruins	NHL	50	11	11	22	74	9	0	2	2	23
1969–70	Los Angeles Kings	NHL	73	22	12	34	113	—	—	—	—	—
1970–71	Los Angeles Kings	NHL	11	2	2	4	8	—	—	—	—	—
1970–71	Buffalo Sabres	NHL	56	25	17	42	93	—	—	—	—	—
1971–72	Buffalo Sabres	NHL	50	11	14	25	34	—	—	—	—	—
1971–72	Pittsburgh Penguins	NHL	18	5	9	14	12	4	0	1	1	15
1972–73	Pittsburgh Penguins	NHL	74	25	20	45	84	—	—	—	—	—
1973–74	Toronto Maple Leafs	NHL	59	7	8	15	74	4	1	0	1	2
1974–75	Toronto Maple Leafs	NHL	26	2	1	3	11	—	—	—	—	—
1974–75	Oklahoma City Blazers	CHL	8	3	4	7	10	—	—	—	—	—
1976–77	Whitby Warriors	OHA-Sr.	9	5	4	9	8	—	—	—	—	—
NHL totals			1,047	239	226	465	1,437	74	6	7	13	151

== See also ==
- List of NHL players with 1,000 games played
