= Abbey Tavern Singers =

- Origin: Dublin, Ireland
- Genres: Folk, roots
- Years active: 1962–present
- Labels: Arc Records, V.I.P. Records, Spin Records

The Abbey Tavern Singers are an Irish vocal group who had a major hit in Canada and a minor hit in the United States in 1966 with "We're off to Dublin in the Green".

== History ==
=== Beginnings ===
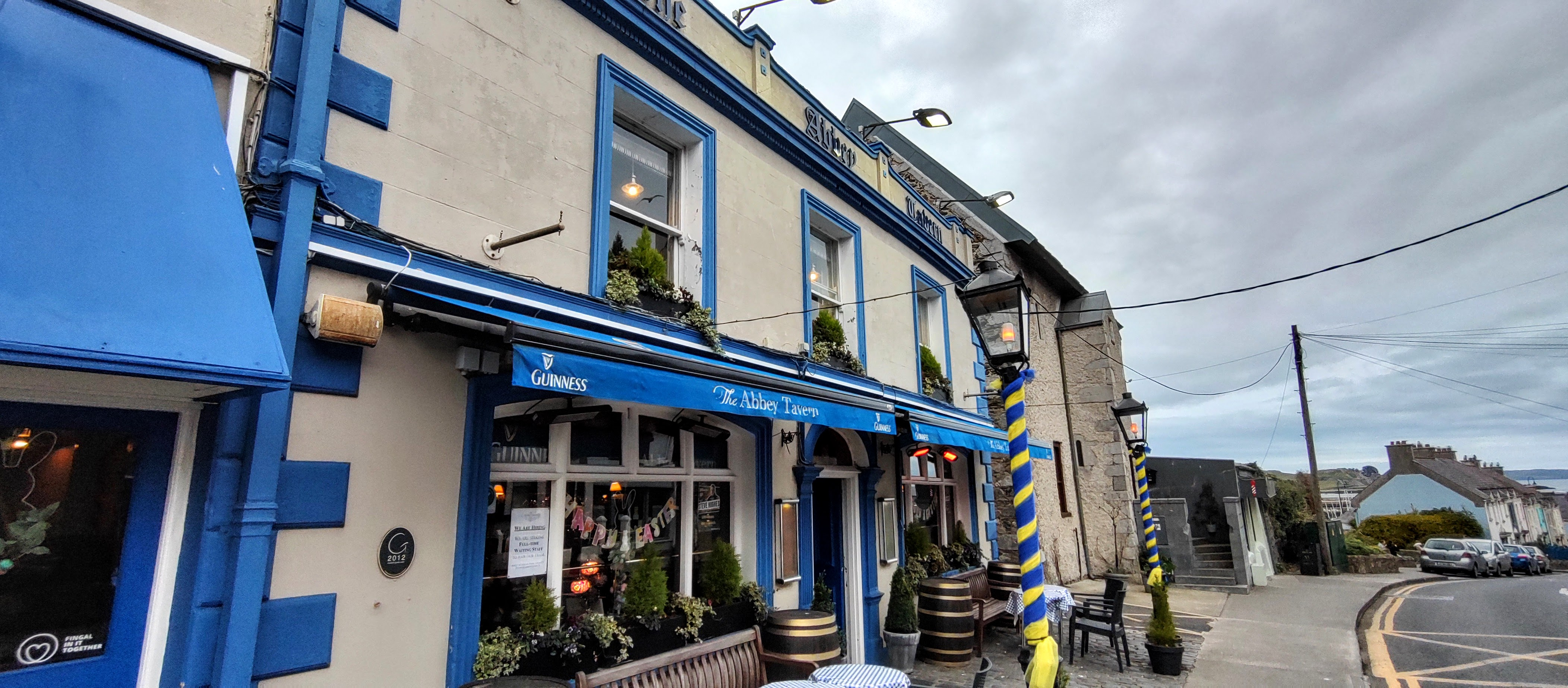
The Abbey Tavern, Howth

The group's history begins in 1962 near the ruins of Howth Abbey, when it was founded by Abbey Tavern owner Minnie Scott-Lennon, who decided to add a sing-along music attraction to her establishment. The idea was immediately successful, and as the group became locally popular an album was released on Pye Records in 1965.

=== We're off to Dublin in the Green ===
A song entitled "We're off to Dublin in the Green" was used by Carling Breweries Ltd in an international television advertising campaign. The song is an IRA marching song dating back to approximately 1916. Using the soundtrack from the commercial, the song was released on Canada's Arc Records and became extremely popular in Canada, reaching No. 2 on Canada's CHUM Charts and selling close to 150,000 copies in Canada within the first year of release. It was a surprise hit, partly because of relatively poor sound quality, partly because of the song's ties to the IRA, and partly because of its association with an alcoholic beverage. It was also released in the United States, on Hanna-Barbera Records where it charted on the Billboard Hot 100, peaking at No. 94 staying for two weeks and on the "Easy Listening" charts at No. 40. "Off to Dublin in the Green" spent five weeks on the Cashbox Top 100 chart, with a peak at number 68. Not wanting to take sides politically, the B-side was a song of the Orangemen, "Captain of the Gallant Forty Twa," which was also featured in beer commercials. Carling Black Label reported increased market share following the release of the advertising campaign and the song's subsequent popularity. Because it was the best selling Irish record in Canada, Mrs. Scott-Lennon was presented with a Trophee International Midem.

=== Popularity and international touring ===
In response to the popularity of "Off to Dublin", albums were also released, containing material recorded entirely at the Abbey Tavern in Ireland. The group stayed on the Arc label for Canadian albums, but oddly were placed with Berry Gordy's V.I.P. Records in the United States. Demand for live appearances became so strong in North America that a tour was conducted there in 1967. These concerts maintained the informal atmosphere of the tavern performances. This tour was lengthy, so their third Canadian album "Abbey Tavern Singers on Tour" was recorded in a Canadian studio instead of at the Abbey Tavern.

=== Return to the Abbey Tavern ===
When the folk-music craze died out, the Abbey Tavern Singers eventually quit their touring, and again became the house attraction at their namesake tavern. On an intermittent basis they continued to travel internationally for special occasions such as St. Patrick's Day. The group's successors were still advertised as performing at the Abbey Tavern in Dublin as of 2013.

== Performance style ==
At the peak of their popularity the group was classified as folk music. The Abbey Tavern Singers intended to create a relaxed, informal atmosphere reminiscent of the original tavern performances. In the middle of a concert stage, this did not always come off as well has hoped. Partly this was because the Singers had not developed a stage act, and were known to appear disinterested when not participating in a given number. While their performances of some songs such as "This Land Is Your Land" were noted for their energy, performances of other songs were panned as maudlin. The group was positively cited for their lack of gimmicks when performing. Although the group name indicated a vocal ensemble, they were praised for their instrumental work in concerts. At one time this included the only full-time Irish spoon player, PJ Downes, who exclusively used Irish nickel-silver spoons for performing, and was known to place tours on hold if the right spoons were unavailable to him Their set lengths were noted for their generosity. In addition to concerts, the Singers would also participate in folk masses while on tour.

== Influence and legacy ==
Arc Records made special trips to Ireland in hopes of discovering new Irish talent in hopes of duplicating the success of the Abbey Tavern Singers. The popularity of "We're off to Dublin in the Green" inspired several cover versions, not all of which were appreciated by the Abbey Tavern Singers.

== Members ==
- Anne Byrne – vocals
- Paddy Joseph "PJ" Downes – spoons
- Seamus Gallagher – fiddle
- Michael MacAoghain – fiddle
- Margaret Monks – vocals
- Tess Nolan – vocals
- John O'Brien – guitar
- Michael O'Connell – vocals
- Joe O'Leary – fiddle
- Brian O'Rourke – banjo
- Bill Powers – banjo; mandolin
- Tommy Reck – Uilleann pipes
- Mary Sheehan – vocals

== Discography ==
=== Singles ===
==== Canada ====
- Arc 1144 – 1966: Off to Dublin in the Green/The Captain of the Gallant Forty Twa'
- Arc 1152 – 1966: Whack Fol De Diddle Dee/The Orange and the Green
- Arc 1165 – 1966: The Wild Rovers/The Orange and the Green

==== United States ====
- Hanna-Barbera 488 and 498 – 1966: Off to Dublin in the Green/A Gallant Forty Twa'

=== Albums ===
- 1965 – The Rafters Ring at The Abbey Tavern – Pye Records (UK)
- 1966 – We're Off To Dublin in the Green – Arc Records (Canada); V.I.P Records (United States); Reissued 1968 in Ireland on Spin Records
- 1967 – You Don't Have To Be Irish... – Arc Records (Canada)
- 1968 – The Abbey Tavern Singers on Tour – Arc Records (Canada); Reissued 1970 in Ireland on Spin Records
- 1969 – Traditional Music And Song – Abbey Tavern Records (Ireland)
- 1970 – Traditional Ballads – Abbey Tavern Records (Ireland)
