= The Ugly Ducklings =

Canadian garage rock band

- Origin: Toronto, Ontario, Canada
- Genres: Rock, garage rock, proto-punk
- Years active: 1965–1974, 1979–1982, 1986, 1988, 1999–2002

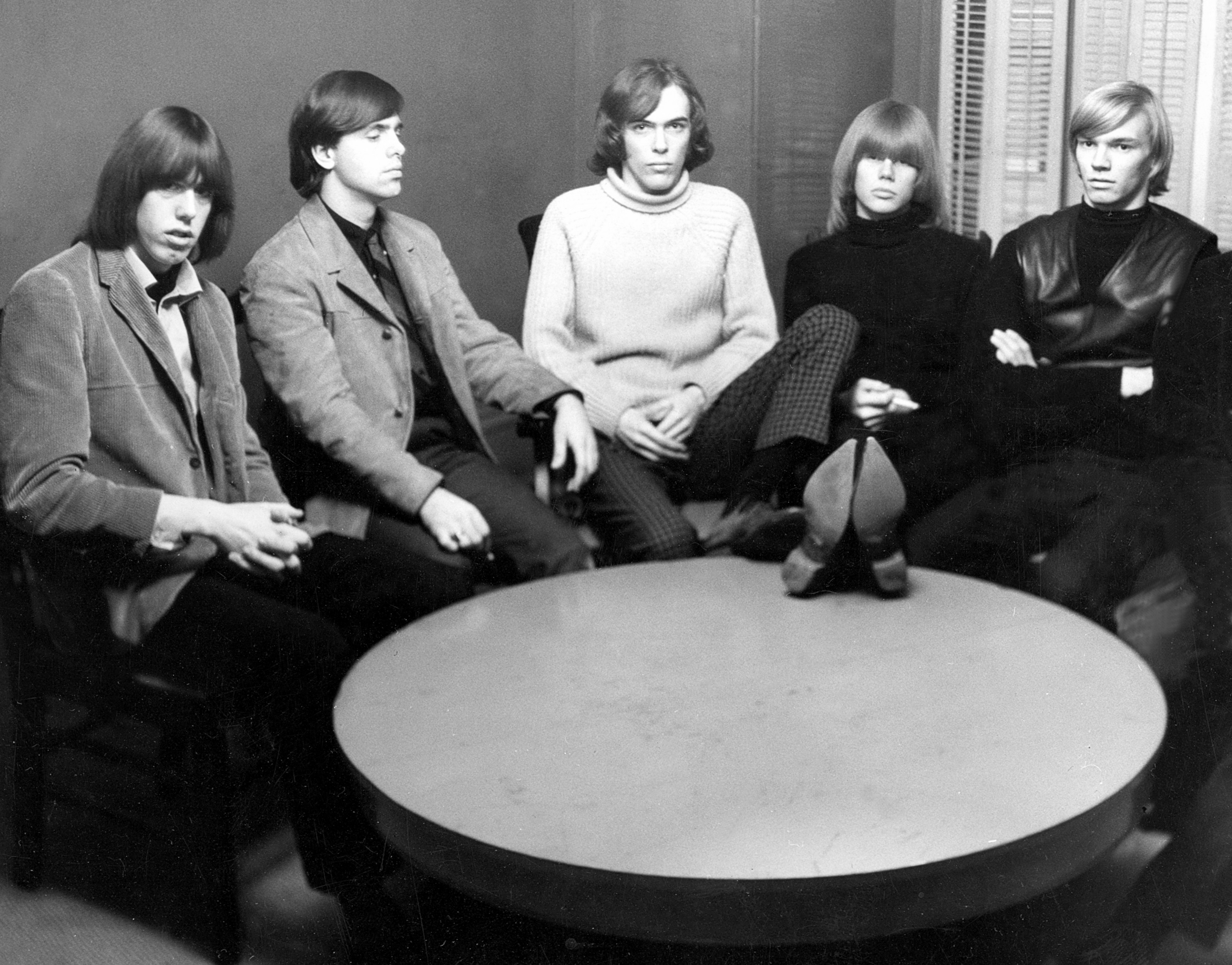

The Ugly Ducklings were a Canadian five-piece garage rock group based in Toronto, Ontario, Canada, most notable during the mid-1960s.

They released six singles in 1966 and 1967 on the Yorktown and Yorkville labels, and one album, Somewhere Outside in 1967. In the summer and fall of 1967, the band's fifth single "Gaslight" became a Top 40 hit across Canada, peaking at No. 17 on the RPM Chart, and reaching No. 1 on CHUM 1050 in Toronto on October 2 that year, displacing The Rolling Stones' two-sided hit, "Dandelion" b/w "We Love You". Their first three singles also made the local 1050 CHUM AM charts in Toronto.

== Career ==
The group was formed in 1965 with Dave Bingham (lead vocals, harmonica), Glynn Bell (rhythm guitar), Roger Mayne (lead guitar), John Read (bass), and Robin Boers (drums). In their early days their music was partially influenced by The Who, The Rolling Stones, The Yardbirds and The Kinks, however the band was still able to create a rough individual sound, typified by their solid garage-punk original material and raw delivery.

The Ugly Ducklings recordings have since been featured on several 1960s garage rock compilation albums, including the Garage Beat 66, Pebbles and Nuggets series. Perhaps in response to their wider recognition via these compilation albums, the band released an album in 1980 called Off the Wall (a year after the Michael Jackson album) that included new recordings of two of their 1960s songs "Nothin'" and "Hey Mama Keep Your Big Mouth Shut", and nine new original songs.

In 1998, three CDs of the band's material were released in a three-month period. The first release, Too Much Too Soon, on Pacemaker, featured all the material from Somewhere Outside, an unreleased track from the album sessions and two single tracks, with an unreleased mix of "Gaslight". Some tracks are true stereo, having been re-mixed with the original four-track session tapes in 1981, some are fake stereo, and some are original mono mixes. The Pacemaker release went out of print quickly due to the original label being sold, but was the only compilation approved and authorized by the group.

Another Canadian label, Unidisc, had purchased the rights to the Ducklings' catalog and reissued both Somewhere Outside and the 1982 compilation The Ugly Ducklings. The Unidisc Somewhere Outside is mostly stereo, with mixes stemming from the 1981 remixes and two true mono tracks. Their release of The Ugly Ducklings fared slightly better, but did not include the single version of their biggest hit, "Gaslight". Instead, the "New York mix" of the tune was used, which does gives some insight into the production work of Bill Gilliland and Brian Ahern, who added to the original production of producer Bob Halley to create the hit version.

The original mono mix of Somewhere Outside is still not officially available on CD. In 2006, an exact reproduction of the original mono Somewhere Outside LP was issued by Beatrocket (an imprint of Sundazed Music), featuring the original cover art and tracks re-mastered by singer Dave Bingham. However, like the earlier Pacemaker compilation, it too was quickly withdrawn from release due to licensing issues.

Several bootleg editions of Somewhere Outside exist. UK bootleg label Beat Records issued a mono CD edition with seven bonus tracks: three from the 1982 compilation LP, the "Gaslight" and "Rimb Nugget" singles, and an unreleased alternate mix of "Postman's Fancy". Japanese bootleg label Oldays Records released a "paper sleeve" CD edition. There have been several unauthorized vinyl reissues of "Somewhere Outside" including one that reproduces the "Yorktown" label. This issue is a direct reproduction of the original album, and is identifiable by a distinct "pink" caste in the color of the album's cover.

A previously unreleased live version of "I'm a Man" (recorded in the band's spacious rehearsal hall in Scarborough, Ontario in November, 1966) was issued by Sundazed Music in 2004. In 2007, YouTube videos of the band were posted, including a performance of a previously unreleased song, "Hangman", from early 1968 and a live performance of "Nothin'" at the Peel Pub in Toronto in 2000.

In 2007, lead singer Dave Bingham personally made available five unreleased albums by the band on eBay, as well as updated versions of "Somewhere Outside", "Off The Wall" and "S.N.A.F.U." All of these releases featured re-mastered sound and graphics by Bingham and were dedicated to the memory of Roger Mayne (a progenitor of the fuzztone guitar), who died of a heart attack in September 2004.

In 2007, East Coast CBC radio host and journalist Bob Mersereau released his book The Top 100 Canadian Albums. The book was a Top 100 list assembled by polling 600 singers, songwriters, musicians, producers, journalists and collectors from across Canada, asking for their top 10 Canadian albums. Each #1 received 10 points, #2 - 9 points, #3 - 8 - etc... down to 1 point for #10. The points were tallied and counted. The Ugly Ducklings' "Somewhere Outside" came in at No. 72, right in there with the likes of Neil Young, Gordon Lightfoot, The Guess Who, April Wine, Bruce Cockburn and other big-name Canadian musical acts. Three years later, Mersereau released his The Top 100 Canadian Singles compiled using the same method; The Ugly Ducklings' "Nothin'", which was recorded for only $330, came in at No. 33.

In July 2011, Pacemaker Records of Toronto released two CDs of Ugly Ducklings material, previously released by Bingham: Somewhere Inside (a live radio show recorded at Toronto radio station CHUM (AM) in January 1967), and "Thump & Twang", unreleased demo recordings of the group from November 1967 - early 1968, featuring Mike McKenna on lead guitar. The disc featuring McKenna includes versions of "Hangman" and "You Can't Judge A Book" as heard on their respective videos on YouTube. The Somewhere Inside disc features a remastered version of the live recording of "I'm A Man" along with unreleased demos and live performances and a radio interview with CHUM Radio DJ Bob McAdorey on his short-lived Sunday night show, called "Talent In Toronto", from early 1967.

In November 2015, lead singer Dave Bingham released an autobiography called, Noise From The North End, through Friesen Press in British Columbia, Canada. The book is a complete history of the band and his subsequent career in Canada and is available in e-book format and as a physical book.

In 2021, lead singer Dave Bingham added all of The Ugly Ducklings music to Spotify, including EP's, singles, live LP's and compilations.

== Discography ==
=== Singles ===
Year	Title	Cat. No.	Chart positions	Notes
Year	Title	Cat. No.	CAN	Notes
1966	"Nothin'"	Yorktown Records 45001	70	b/w "I Can Tell" First pressings on black label with silver lettering; second pressings on colored label.
1966	"10:30 Train"	Yorktown Records 45002	92	10:30 Train charted for one week, replaced by She Ain't No Use To Me.
1966	"She Ain't No Use to Me"	Yorktown Records 45002	59	10:30 Train charted for one week, replaced by She Ain't No Use To Me.
1966	"Just in Case You Wonder"	Yorktown Records 45003	81	b/w "That's Just A Thought That I Had In My Mind" Some promo copies incorrectly give title as "Just in Case You're Wondering".
1967	"Postman's Fancy"	Yorktown Records 45005	-	b/w "Not For Long"
1967	"Gaslight"	Yorkville 45013	17	b/w "Rimb Nugget"
1968	"I Know What To Say"	Yorkville 45017	-	b/w "Epilogue"
1976	"Gaslight"	Arc Records U. R. 1021	-	b/w "Nothin'"
1979	"The Pain Is All Right"	Razor Records 002	-	b/w "Just Another Rock'N'Roll Band"
198?	"Just In Case You Wonder"	Underground Records URC-1035	-	b/w "Tobacco Road" (performed by The Nashville Teens)
2000	"Nothin'"	Sundazed Music S-148	-	b/w "I Can Tell"

CHUM (Toronto) chart info: Aug. 1966 – Nothin' No. 18, Oct. 1966 – She Ain't No Use To Me No. 30, Jan. 1967 – Just In Case You Wonder No. 24; Oct. 1967 Gaslight No. 1.

=== Albums ===
- Somewhere Outside - 1966 - YorkTown Records Produced by 'The Ducks', executive producer Bill Huard.(1998 CD reissue - Unidisc; 2006 US mono LP reissue - BeatRocket)
- Off The Wall - 1980 - Razor Records
- S.N.A.F.U. - 2001 - Other Peoples Music Produced by Grammy & Juno Award winner Peter J. Moore

=== Compilations ===
- The Ugly Ducklings - 1982 - YorkTown Records (1998 CD reissue - Unidisc)
- Too Much Too Soon - 1998 - Pacemaker Entertainment Limited
- Thump & Twang - 2011 - Pacemaker Entertainment Limited (unreleased 1967-68 recordings)
- Somewhere Inside - 2011 - Pacemaker Entertainment Limited (live at CHUM AM, 1967)
