= NewPax Records =

- Founded: 1975
- Founder: Gary S. Paxton
- Status: Defunct
- Distributors: Word Records, Benson Records
- Genre: Christian music
- Country of origin: United States

Newpax Records was a record label focused on Christian folk, pop, and light rock. It was created by Gary Paxton. It was active during the period 1975–1985. It had at least 83 releases during that period.

The Newpax roster included such performers as Don Francisco and Gary Dunham.

NewPax was associated with Paragon Records. Both were distributed by Word Records until 1980. Subsequently, they were distributed by Benson Records.

== History ==
Mike Johnson recorded for the label. His album More Than Just an Act was released on Newpax NP33043 in 1977.
