= John Bradley (American actor) =

American actor

John A. Bradley is an American actor known for his work in television, with a career that includes appearances in both minor roles in blockbuster films such as "Mars Attacks!", "Ablaze," and "Independence Day," and noteworthy roles in various television series.

== Career ==
Bradley's breakout role came with his portrayal of Johnny Farrell in the 1998 television adaptation, of "The Dirty Dozen" which was broadcast on the Fox Network. He later played Mike Durning in the 1996 drama series "L.A. Firefighters." Bradley's television career further expanded with a leading role in the third and fourth seasons of "The New Adventures of Robin Hood."

Over the years, Bradley has made guest appearances in a range of television shows, including "Melrose Place," "Baywatch," "University Hospital," "ER," "The District," "CSI: Miami," "Desperate Housewives" and others.
