= Dark Universe (film) =

- Directed by: Steve Latshaw
- Produced by: Fred Olen Ray; Jim Wynorski
- Starring: Joe Estevez
- Release date: 1993
- Country: USA
- Language: English
- Budget: $40,000
- Box office: $400,000

Dark Universe is a 1993 horror/science-fiction film starring Blake Pickett, Cherie Scott, Bently Title, John Maynard, Paul Austin Saunders, Patrick Moran, Tom Ferguson, Steve Barkett, and Joe Estevez as Rod Kendrick. The soundtrack was composed by Jeffrey Walton. The film was written by Moran, executive-produced by Fred Olen Ray, Grant Austin Waldman, and Jim Wynorski, and directed by Steve Latshaw.

== Plot ==
While on board the space ship Nautilus, an astronaut turns into an Alien-like monster after being infected by alien spores. When the ship crash lands in Florida, the monster goes on a killing rampage.

== Cast ==
- Joe Estevez as Rod Kendrick
- Blake Pickett as Kim Masters
- Laurie Sherman as Judy Lawson (credited as Cherie Scott)
- Bently Tittle as Tom Hanning
- John Maynard as Frank Norris
- Paul Austin Sanders as Jack Reese
- Patrick Moran as Carlson
- Tom Ferguson as Denning
- Steve Barkett as Steve Thomas
- William Grefe as Old Tom Harding

== Production ==
According to Stephen Latshaw the film was shot in ten days for $40,000 and was "a huge hit for Curb Entertainment... it took in over $400,000 in world wide sales."

== Reception ==
Creature Feature gave the movie one star, calling it boring and inept.

== Home Release ==
The movie is available to rent or buy on Amazon Prime Video as of May 2024

== Video box description ==
"From the darkest corner of the universe comes an alien terror with a cold-blooded mission...conquer the Earth and harvest its inhabitants as a food source. Can our world survive this nightmare from deep space?"
