= Ablaze (2001 film) =

2001 film by Jim Wynorski

- DVD cover
- Directed by: Jim Wynorski (credited as Jay Andrews)
- Written by: Steve Latshaw
- Produced by: Alison Semenza; Andrew Stevens; Jim Wynorski
- Starring: John Bradley; Tom Arnold; Michael Dudikoff; Ice-T
- Cinematography: Andrea V. Rossotto
- Edited by: Craig Kitson
- Music by: Neal Acree
- Production companies: Phoenician Entertainment; Firestorm Pictures
- Distributed by: New City Releasing; Firestorm Productions; Lionsgate
- Release dates: June 18, 2001 (Greece); July 16, 2002 (United States)
- Running time: 97 min.
- Country: United States
- Language: English

Ablaze is a 2001 American direct-to-video disaster film directed by Jim Wynorski and starring John Bradley, Tom Arnold, and Michael Dudikoff.

== Plot ==
Andrew Thomas is an agent recording the violations made at an oil refinery next to a suburban town. His brother, Jack, is a firefighter. At the local hospital, Jack's ex-girlfriend, Dr. Jennifer Lewis, defies the orders of her boss, Vivian Sims, to help a pregnant woman named Mindi Hunter.

A young kid named Barry accidentally sets his house on fire. Jack's team is sent by chief Sam Davis to rescue him and his mother, Gwen. Jack is injured and they all end up in the hospital.

Andrew finds numerous violations and discovers a plot to burn the refinery down to collect the insurance money. The planned explosion injures Andrew. The assistant of the refinery's manager, Curt Peters, and worker Rick Woods take Andrew to the hospital.

As the fire spreads across the city, the refinery's manager, Wendell Mays, sends Peters and Woods to retrieve a document from Andrew's office concerning the violations. Peters retrieves the documents, but is burned alive in the process and run over by a car, killing him. Woods decides to forget the document, and drives off.

Davis orders the hospital to be evacuated. He confronts Mayor Phillips for his involvement in the initial explosion. Jack is told that Andrew is in critical condition. He visits Andrew, who gives him one last tearful goodbye before dying.

Barry experiences an asthma attack, although he is taken care of. Mindi gives birth to a girl named Hayley, and the evacuation begins. Wendell and Vivian are evacuated in a truck, but an exploding building causes the truck to catch on fire, killing them.

With the help of news cameraman Tim Vester, Jack evacuates the people in the hospital to various rescue units. However, while racing to the units, Tim is killed by falling scaffolding. Everybody else reaches the rescue units and are taken to makeshift hospitals. Jack and his team send off the last unit before an explosion destroys the entire section of the city. All of the firefighters survive the explosion, and Jack reunites with Jennifer. In the aftermath, Davis arrests Phillips.

== Cast ==
- John Bradley as Jack Thomas, a fire chief.
- Tom Arnold as Wendell Mays, the greedy owner of the oil refinery.
- Michael Dudikoff as Gary Daniels, a member on Jack's team.
- Ice-T as Albert Denning, a police officer.
- Amanda Pays as Dr. Jennifer Lewis, Jack's ex-girlfriend, and the doctor at the hospital.
- Cathy Lee Crosby as Elizabeth Sherman, a former actress who assists the doctors during the firestorm.
- Pat Harrington, Jr. as Dr. Stuart Ridgley, one of the doctors at the hospital.
- Edward Albert as Mayor Phillips, the town's corrupt mayor.
- Mary Jo Catlett as Nurse Winslow, a nurse at the hospital.
- Melissa Brasselle as Mindi Hunter, a pregnant woman about to go into labor who Jennifer and Winslow help during the fire.'
- Larry Poindexter as Andrew Thomas, Jack's estranged younger brother who is sent to report Wendell's violations.
- Carolyn Seymour as Dr. Vivian Sims, the corrupt manager of the hospital who also is a doctor.
- William Zabka as Curt Peters, Wendell's assistant.
- Richard Biggs as Garrison, a member of Jack's team.
- Michael Trucco as Scott, a new member on Jack's team.
- Michael Cavanaugh as Chief Sam Davis, Andrew's boss, and the head of the medical unit.
- Eric James Virgets as Workman, a member of Jack's team.
- David Bowe as Rick Woods, a worker at the refinery.
- Dorian Lopinto as Gwen Christopher, a woman living in the town.
- Scotty Cox as Barry Christopher, Gwen's son.
- Sharron Leigh as Alaina Charles, a news reporter.
- Christian Oliver as Tim Vester, Alaina's cameraman.
- Robert Clotworthy as Harris, a dispatcher on the medical unit.
- Dane Farwell as Freddy, a criminal that Jack and Albert kill early in the film.

== Production ==
Ablaze was directed by Jim Wynorski, a filmmaker known for low-budget genre films. The film uses stock footage from other films: the car chase scene at the beginning is from the 1993 film Striking Distance, and the film extensively uses footage from the film City on Fire and the 1970s TV series Emergency!. The film's use of stock footage contributed to its large-scale disaster sequences while helping reduce production costs.

== Release ==
Ablaze was released direct-to-video in the United States on July 16, 2002. The film had an earlier release in Greece on June 18, 2001.

== Depiction of disaster ==
The film depicts a large-scale urban fire disaster caused by industrial negligence and infrastructure failure. Much of the plot focuses on emergency response efforts, including firefighters, medical personnel, evacuations, and public safety during the crisis. The film also portrays the effects of panic, corruption, and poor decision-making during a large-scale emergency. The film emphasizes coordination between emergency services and highlights the challenges of evacuating civilians during a rapidly spreading urban disaster. The disaster portrayed in the film results in widespread damage to infrastructure, hospital evacuations, and disruptions to emergency services throughout the city.

== Reception ==
Ablaze received generally negative reviews. On Rotten Tomatoes, the film has limited critical coverage, but available reviews have been unfavorable. Critics have noted the film’s heavy reliance on stock footage and low production value. Some viewers have described the film as unintentionally entertaining due to its exaggerated performances and disaster film clichés. Some reviews criticized the film's heavy reliance on stock footage and low-budget visual effects.
