= Fever Tree (album) =

Studio album by Fever Tree
- Released: March 28, 1968
- Recorded: January 1968
- Studio: Andrus Recording Studios, Los Angeles, California
- Genre: Psychedelic rock; garage rock; baroque pop; folk rock
- Length: 34:41
- Label: Uni
- Producer: Scott Holtzman, Vivian Holtzman

Fever Tree chronology
Fever Tree (1968)	Another Time, Another Place (1969)

Singles from Fever Tree
- 1. "San Francisco Girls (Return of the Native)" Released: March 1968

Professional ratings
Review scores
Source	Rating
Allmusic	3.5/5 stars

Fever Tree is the debut studio album by the American psychedelic rock band Fever Tree and was released on March 28, 1968, on Uni Records (see 1968 in music). It blended multiple influences ranging from psychedelia to baroque pop and folk rock, and was marked by eerie ballads and hard rock numbers. Much of the group's material was penned by the husband-wife songwriting duo of Scott and Vivian Holtzman, along with renditions of contemporary rock songs. The album was preceded by arguably Fever Tree's best known song, "San Francisco Girls (Return of the Native)", becoming the group's only nationally charting single. Like its attendant single, Fever Tree was also moderately successful and managed to reach number 156 on the Billboard 200 Top LPs.

== Background ==
Fever Tree's first two singles became successful enough on a regional scale to convince record producing and songwriting duo, Scott and Vivian Holtzman, to secure a recording contract with Uni Records. Recording sessions commenced in January 1968 at Andrus Studios in Los Angeles after the group's relocation from Houston. With arrangements conducted by David Angel, who worked on the acclaimed Love album, Forever Changes, the recordings featured baroque and classical orchestration, and intricate horn instrumental patterns. The album is highlighted by the striking lead vocals of Dennis Keller, and the experimental keyboard textures arranged by Rob Landes.

The eleven songs included on Fever Tree exhibit a wide array of styles, encompassing elements of hard rock and jazz on "Where Do You Go?", pop music on "The Sun Also Rises", folk rock, on the cover version of "Nowadays Clancy Can't Even Sing", and psychedelia throughout. In addition, the multi-sectioned structures and classical structures served as an indication toward Fever Tree's progressive rock experimentation that they would explore on their second album, Another Time, Another Place. The album's centerpiece is the group's only charting single, "San Francisco Girls (Return of the Native)". Written by the Holtzman duo, the composition made use of baroque pop-style harpsichord, droning sustain guitar instrumentals, and somber percussion. The song saw heavy US airplay and managed to reach number 91 on the Billboard Hot 100.

Fever Tree was released on March 28, 1968, and became a moderate hit when it charted at number 156 on the Billboard 200. In 1993, the album was rereleased on compact disc along with Fever Tree's second album, Another Time, Another Place on Collector's Choice Records. Additionally, the album was distributed on CD by Sundazed Music in 2009. Most of the material from Fever Tree (tracks 1–7, 10–11) is also featured on the 1986 compilation album, San Francisco Girls: The Best of Fever Tree.

== Track listing ==
1. "Imitation Situation 1 (Toccata and Fugue)" (J. S. Bach, Rob Landes, Scott Holtzman, Vivian Holtzman) – 2:32
2. "Where Do You Go?" (Michael Knust, S. Holtzman, V. Holtzman) – 2:25
3. "San Francisco Girls (Return of the Native)" (Knust, S. Holtzman, V. Holtzman) – 3:58
4. "Ninety-Nine And One Half" (Steve Cropper, Wilson Pickett) – 2:45
5. "Man Who Paints the Pictures" (Knust, S. Holtzman, V. Holtzman) – 2:32
6. "Filigree and Shadow" (S. Holtzman, V. Holtzman) – 3:51
7. "The Sun Also Rises" (Rob Landes, S. Holtzman, V. Holtzman) – 2:41
8. "Day Tripper" / "We Can Work It Out" (John Lennon, Paul McCartney) – 3:27
9. "Nowadays Clancy Can't Even Sing" (Neil Young) – 3:00
10. "Unlock My Door" (Landes, S. Holtzman, V. Holtzman) – 3:45
11. "Come with Me (Rainsong)" (Landes, S. Holtzman, V. Holtzman) – 3:45

== Personnel ==
=== Musicians ===
- Dennis Keller – lead vocals
- E.E. Wolfe – bass guitar
- John Tuttle – percussion
- Michael Knust – lead guitar
- Rob Landes – cello, clavinet, flute, harp, harpsichord, organ, piano, recorder

=== Technical ===
- Scott Holtzman, Vivian Holtzman – producers
- Walter Andrus – engineer
