= San Francisco Girls (Return of the Native) =

Single by Fever Tree

from the album Fever Tree
- B-side: "Come with Me"
- Released: March 1968
- Recorded: 1968
- Genre: Psychedelic pop
- Length: 3:05
- Label: Uni
- Songwriter(s): Scott Holtzman, Vivian Holtzman
- Producer(s): Scott Holtzman, Vivian Holtzman

Fever Tree singles chronology
"San Francisco Girls (Return of the Native)" (1968)	"What Time Did You Say It Is in Salt Lake City" (1968)

"San Francisco Girls (Return of the Native)" is a song by the American psychedelic rock band Fever Tree, written by the songwriting duo Scott and Vivian Holtzman, and was released for the group's third single—their first on Uni Records—in March 1968 (see 1968 in music). It was the only single by Fever Tree to reach the Billboard Hot 100 and also appears on their first album Fever Tree.

The Holtzman couple penned "San Francisco Girls" just as other musical artists were scoring national hits with Bay Area-inspired tunes, most notably Scott McKenzie's "San Francisco (Be Sure to Wear Flowers in Your Hair)" and Eric Burdon and the Animals' "San Franciscan Nights". Record producer David Angel, who is best-remembered for his work on Love's album, Forever Changes, also contributed to the song's arrangement, adding components of orchestration and baroque pop that was not typical to most psychedelic groups. "San Francisco Girls" is marked by its abrupt tempo shifts, Michael Knust's fuzz-drenched guitar instrumentals, and the harpsichord by classically trained multi-instrumentalist Rob Landes.

The single was released in March 1968 and peaked at number 91 on the Billboard Hot 100 the weeks of June 1, 8 and 15 and October 5 of that year. It had exited the charts after three weeks, only to reenter the third week of September. It endured longer as a regional FM radio favorite. It also appeared on Fever Tree's moderately successful debut album, Fever Tree. The song has since been featured on the compilation and live albums San Francisco Girls: The Best of Fever Tree, Best of Fever Tree, Live at Lake Charles 1978, and Live 1969, among others.
