= Biohazard: The Alien Force =

1994 US science fiction adventure film by Steve Latshaw

- Film poster
- Directed by: Steve Latshaw
- Written by: Steve Latshaw; Patrick Moran
- Produced by: Patrick Moran; Fred Olen Ray; Jim Wynorski
- Starring: Chris Mitchum
- Production company: American Independent Productions
- Release date: 1994
- Running time: 88 minutes
- Country: United States
- Language: English
- Budget: $50,000

Biohazard: The Alien Force is a 1994 American horror film directed by Steve Latshaw.

== Cast ==
- James L. Miles as The BioMonster
- John Alexander as Detective Morley
- Dorothy Best as Caitlan Palmer
- Katherine Culliver as Shana Alexander
- Trevor David as Donner
- Tom Ferguson as Quint
- Susan Fronsoe as Nicki Carstairs
- William Grefe as Mr. Babb (credited as Bill Grefe)
- John Latshaw as Kelly
- Charles Maginnis as Brandon Wellesley
- John Maynard as Lieutenant Warren
- Christopher Mitchum as Donald Brady
- Patrick Moran as Dr. Lynch
- Gersh Morningstar as Mr. Esper
- Keith Tuxhorn as The Fixer
- Catherine Walsh as Dr. Phillips
- Steve Zurk as Mike Reardon

== Production ==
It was the second in a series of films Stephen Latshaw made for Fred Olen Ray. Latshaw later said it was one of his favourite films:

Because of the wonderful memories of Florida, our cast and crew, and the fact that we broke all the rules and made an action-packed sci fi adventure with 28 speaking parts, 50 locations, car chases, helicopter battles, running and jumping fights, more car chases at Universal studios, exploding lab complexes and Chris Mitchum. And all for about $50,000.

Footage of a lab explosion wound up in two other Fred Olen Ray films.

== Reception ==
A review at TV Guide stated, "With an amateurish cast, devoid of editing rhythms, gratuitously graphic, and badly written, BIOHAZARD is more of a filmed casualty list than a polished chiller." The film has also been described as "another cheesy Alien rip-off with slimy beasts from space."
