= Fever Tree (band) =

American rock band

- Origin: Houston, Texas, United States
- Genres: Psychedelic rock, garage rock
- Years active: 1966–1970, 1978
- Labels: Uni, Ampex, Shroom Records
- Past members: Dennis Keller; Michael Knust; Rob Landes; E.E. "Bud" Wolfe; John Tuttle

Fever Tree is a former American psychedelic rock band of the 1960s, chiefly known for their anthemic 1968 hit, "San Francisco Girls (Return of the Native)".

== History ==
The group originated in Houston, Texas and began in 1966 as a folk rock group called The Bostwick Vines. They changed their name to Fever Tree a year later after the addition of keyboard player Rob Landes.

The band briefly entered the public consciousness when their song "San Francisco Girls (Return of the Native)" reached No. 91 in the U.S. on the Billboard Hot 100 chart in June 1968. Like most of the band's material, it was written by the couple of Scott and Vivian Holtzman, who also were their producers. This four-minute track captured all the band's trademarks: Dennis Keller's incantation-like vocals, the quick shifting between slow parts with an almost sacral feeling and faster, more rock-oriented parts, and especially the searing guitar work by Michael Knust.

Fever Tree also released their self-titled debut album, Fever Tree, in 1968, which charted at No. 156 on the Billboard 200 Chart. A second album, Another Time, Another Place, followed in 1969 and peaked at No. 83 with a third album Creation, charting at No. 97 on the Billboard 200 Chart in 1970. After "San Francisco Girls", they never had another hit, although they later also tried writing songs themselves when they had dropped the Holtzmans as producers. The group disbanded in 1970, but reformed in 1978 with only guitarist Michael Knust remaining from the original line-up. The new formation of the group had little commercial success; Fever Tree was not heard of again until 2003 when Michael Knust died.

Fever Tree's first two albums (Fever Tree and Another Time, Another Place) were re-released as a single CD on October 31, 2006. Fever Tree's third and fourth albums (Creation and For Sale) are also available as a single CD.

Their recording of "Ninety-Nine and a Half (Won't Do)" by Steve Cropper, Eddie Floyd, and Wilson Pickett was sampled as the primary riff in Madvillain's "America's Most Blunted" from their 2004 self-titled debut.

== Band members ==
- Dennis Keller – vocals
- Michael Stephen Knust (March 11, 1949 - September 15, 2003) – guitar
- Rob Landes – synthesizer, organ, piano
- E.E. "Bud" Wolfe – bass guitar
- John Tuttle – drums
- Don Lampton – guitar, keyboards

== Discography ==
Albums

- Fever Tree (1968), Uni Records/MCA - US Billboard No. 156
- Another Time, Another Place (1968), Uni/MCA - US Billboard No. 83
- Creation (1970), Uni - US Billboard No. 97
- For Sale (1970), Uni - did not chart

Tracks:

- "Man Who Paints the Pictures - Part 2"
- "What Time Did You Say it is in Salt Lake City?"
- "Don't Come Crying To Me Girl"
- "Fever"
- "Grand Candy Young Sweet"
- "Jokes Are For Sad People"
- "I've Never Seen Evergreen"
- "Peace of Mind"
- "Death is the Dancer"
- Creation (1969), Uni/MCA - US Billboard No. 97
- For Sale (1970), Ampex Records
- Live at Lake Charles (1978), Shroom Records
- Live 1969 (2011), Sundazed Records

Singles

- "Hey Mister" / "I Can Beat Your Drum" (1967)
- "Girl, Oh Girl (Don't Push Me)" / "Steve Lenore" (1967) - US Record World No. 140
- "San Francisco Girls (Return of the Native)" / "Come With Me (Rainsong)" (1968) - US Billboard No. 91
- "What Time Did You Say It Is In Salt Lake City?" / "Where Did You Go?" (1968) - US Cash Box No. 105
- "Love Makes the Sun Rise" / "Filigree and Shadow" (1969)
- "Clancy (Nowadays Clancy Can't Even Sing)" / "The Sun Also Rises" (1969)
- "Catcher In the Rye" / "What Time Did You Say It Is In Salt Lake City?" (1970)
- "I Am" / "Grand Candy Young Sweet" (1970)
- "She Comes In Colors" / "You're Not the Same Baby" (1971)
- "I Put a Spell on You" / "Hey Joe, Where You Gonna Go" (1971)
