= Deep South Records =

- Parent company: Album Globe Distribution Co. Inc
- Founder: Allen Cash
- Genre: Country
- Country of origin: United States
- Location: 622 West Iris. Nashville, Tennessee 37206

Deep South Records was an American country music record label that was active during the 1980s. It produced a string of chart hits during that decade. Two of its more prominent artists were Noel Haughey and Dennis Weaver.

== Background ==
The label was headed by producer Allen Cash. The vice president was Frank Bober. Its distribution in the United States was handled by Mike Sheppard and Album Globe distributors. The promotional side of the operation was handled by Keith Stewart, Johnny 'K', and Bob Saporiti. The headquarters was located at 622 West Iris, Nashville, Tennessee 37206. Another point of contact for the organization was at 31 Industrial Park, PO 1569 Hendersonville, Tennessee 37075. The parent company for the label was Album Globe Distribution Co. Inc. which was located at 31 Industrial Park Drive, Hendersonville, Tennessee.

Prior to founding Deep South Records, Allen Cash was president of Brougham Records Inc., which was located at 107 Music City Circle, Nashville, Tennessee 37214. Under the umbrella of the organization was Brougham Records, Cash Recording Studio, Division Publishing, Video Productions LTD and Heads or Tails, a retail outlet which provided souvenirs and tee shirts. The Brougham label was founded in the mid-1970s.

The two artists that were first on the Deep South Records roster were Noel and Dennis Weaver. Other artists on the label were, Ron Blair, C.C. Conley, Billy Jack, Coni Causey, and Michael Craig Johnson.

== History ==
It was reported in the 26 February 1982 issue of Radio & Records that independent record label, Deep South Records had announced its formation and two artists, Noel and Dennis Weaver had been signed to the label.

Singer Noel recorded "Lying Myself to Sleep" which was released as a single on Deep South A.G. 681 in 1982. It was a Country Feature Pick in the 27 February issue of Cash Box. It was a chart hit, registering on the Cash Box Top 100 Country Singles chart. At week four, for the week of 24 April, it peaked at No. 78 on the chart. It held that position for an additional week.

Former member and founder of Christian rock band The Exkursions, Michael Craig Johnson recorded "Little Boy in Denver" which was released on Deep South Records AG 684 in 1982.

Coni Causey recorded the Noel Haughey compositions, "Belle of the Ball" bw "I Wish there Was Another Woman", which appeared on single Deep South Records A. G. 703 that was released in 1982. It was "I Wish There Was Another Woman" that made the chart, peaking at No. 92 for the week of 13 November and holding that position for an additional week.

Working with producer Allen Cash, Dennis Weaver recorded "If I Had a Love Song", which was backed with "Red Bandana". It was released on Deep South Records single A.G. 705 in 1982.

Noel recorded "One Tear at a Time" which was released on Deep South Records A.G. 706. It was a Feature Pick in the 30 October issue of Cash Box. It peaked at No. 73 on the Top 100 Country Singles chart. It held that position for one more week. It also peaked at No. 90 on the Billboard Country chart.

Ron Blair was a wedding singer from California who began in 1969, performing on the San Francisco bistro circuit. He impressed producer Allen Cash while singing at Cash's own wedding. He also had a steady gig at the Quail Lodge in Carmel Valley. He recorded "Little Boy in Denver", which was released on Deep South Records A.G. 710 in November 1982. The song which was written by Michael Craig Johnson and produced by Allen Cash was reviewed in the November 1982 issue of Music Row. The review was luke warm and even though the reviewer wrote that there were similarities to David Houston, Slim Whitman, and Jimmie Rodgers, the production was said to be ok, but it lacked licks. The record debuted at No. 96 on the Cash Box Top 100 Country Singles chart for the week of 8 January 1983. It held the position for one more week.

Coni Causey recorded "Weekend Rendezvous" bw "Hellfire and Brimstone" which was released on Deep South Records A.G. 717. It peaked at No. 79 on the Cash Box Top 100 Country Singles chart.

Noel recorded "L-L-L-L, Love You All Night" which was released on Deep South DS-1003 in 1983. Having been in the chart for five weeks, it peaked at No. 94 for the week of 17 September. It held that position for one more week.

John Balzer recorded "Texas, You're My Only Hope" bw "You're in My Dreams" which was released on Deep South Records DS-82483 in 1983. The production duties were shared between Balzer and Allen Cash. It was one of the nine Cash Box Country Radio Feature Picks for the week of 5 November 1983.

Steve Lucas wrote the song "Play Another Love Song" which was produced by Allen Cash and released on Deep South Records 1006. It was noted in the 24 December 1983 issue of Billboard.

Steve Snyder was a former Super Productions artist who recorded "Beautiful Lady" which was written by Noel Haughey. The song was produced by Allen Cash and released on Super Productions 647. It had a good review in the 25 April 1981 issue of Record World. He recorded another Noel Haughey composition, "Gotta Get Thru". Backed with the Richard Damarjin and Shawn Morrow composition, Love Is Real, it was released on Deep South DSR0022.

C.C. Conley recorded the Noel Haughey composition "Beautiful Lady", a song which was released on single MSA 23-A. It impressed the Cash Box review panel, and the review appeared in the 6 June 1987 issue of Cash Box where it was one of the three Indie Feature Picks. Unfortunately, no production details were on the record. It would later be an Indie Feature Pick in the 4 August 1990 issue of Cash Box.

Noel, now going by her married name of Noel Cash, recorded "I Believe in You" bw "Leavin' the Leavin'" which was released on Deep South Records DSR-1111 in 1987. It made the Cash Box Indie Top 20 chart, and had debuted at No. 82 in the Cash Box Country Singles chart. The single also made the Top Independent Country Singles chart. For the survey period ending August 25, 1987, it was at No. 25.

Noel Cash recorded "Time and Time Again (Ode to Grandpa)" bw "What I Really, Really Want", which was released on Deep South Records DSR-1112 in 1987. Both sides were written by her. Having been in the Cash Box Top 100 Country Singles chart, it peaked at No. 65. It held that position until the week of 23 January 1988.
