= Arc Records (Canada) =

Defunct Canadian record label

- Founded: 1958
- Status: Defunct
- Genre: Various
- Country of origin: Canada

Arc Records, was a Canadian record label established in Toronto by Phil G. Anderson and William R. (Bill) Gilliland. The label was a subsidiary of the Arc Sound holding company which was established in April 1958. Some of the artists released on the label include the Abbey Tavern Singers, Terry Black, Dublin Corporation and Marg Osburne. Another subsidiary of Arc Sound was Yorkville Records.

== Background ==
Phil G. Anderson and William R. (Bill) Gilliland originally provided Canadian promotion, merchandising and distribution for other labels. Arc started manufacturing its own records in 1959. As of 1968, the president was Anderson and the vice-president was Bill Gilliland. That year the label announced its plans to enter the international market.

In 1965, the label released a single called "The Klan". It contained the lyrics, "Now, he who travels with the Klan, he is a monster, not a man". It was announced in the June 12 issue of Billboard that prominent political figures, including civil rights movement leader Martin Luther King Jr., were to receive copies of the single. There had been an effort to promote the single. The band behind this anti-Klan single was The Brothers-in-Law with their The Brothers-In-Law Strike Again album.

In 1967, a Canadian court issued an injunction against the label, restraining them from the manufacture and distribution of a recording titled "This Land Is Whose Land???" The song, recorded by Brothers-In-Law, was an unauthorized parody of the Woody Guthrie tune This Land Is Your Land.

Besides the aforementioned artists, Arc Sound signed and produced many other top Canadian recording artists in the 1960s, such as Anne Murray, Stitch in Tyme, Catherine McKinnon, Fred McKenna, Harry Hibbs, Ronnie Hawkins, The Travellers and the Ugly Ducklings. One of their biggest successes was the Canadian release of "We're Off to Dublin in the Green" by the Abbey Tavern Singers. The group was an Irish band but became enormously popular in Canada, as the song reached #2 on Canada's CHUM Charts and sold close to 150,000 copies in Canada within the first year of release.

In the early 1970s, Arc Sound became a subsidiary of AHED (acronym for Arc Home Entertainment Diversified), a music technology company (main product line was the GBX amplifier) owned by Anderson. AHED, including Arc Records and Arc Sound, ceased operations in 1986 due to the slow Canadian economy and changes in the music industry.
