= List of The Real Housewives of Orange County episodes =

The Real Housewives of Orange County is an American reality television series that began airing March 21, 2006, and airs on Bravo. Set in Orange County, California, and created by Scott Dunlop, it is the first The Real Housewives installment in the franchise. The Real Housewives of Orange County is a voyeuristic look into the wealthy lives of these housewives, as they shop, get plastic surgery, gossip, fight and live lavishly. The 2008 financial crisis has trimmed the housewives' lifestyles with job losses, evictions, mortgage defaults, foreclosures, and marital stress—all recorded in progressive seasons of the show. The series' 20th season chronicles eight women in Orange County— Vicki Gunvalson, Tamra Judge, Heather Dubrow, Shannon Storms Beador, Gina Kirschenheiter, Emily Simpson, Jenn Pedranti and Carmella Garcia –as they balance their personal and business lives, along with their social circle.

Former cast members featured over the previous seasons are: Kimberly Bryant (1), Jo De La Rosa (1-2), Jeana Keough (1–5), Lauri Peterson (1–4), Tammy Knickerbocker (2–3), Quinn Fry (3), Lynne Curtin (4–5), Gretchen Rossi (4–8), Alexis Bellino (5–8), Peggy Tanous (6), Lydia McLaughlin (8, 12), Lizzie Rovsek (9), Meghan King Edmonds (10–12), Kelly Dodd (11–15), Peggy Sulahian (12), Braunwyn Windham-Burke (14–15), Elizabeth Lyn Vargas (15), Dr. Jen Armstrong (16), Noella Bergener (16) and Katie Ginella (18–19). As of November 12, 2026, 367 episodes of The Real Housewives of Orange County have aired, concluding the twentieth season.

== Series overview ==
The Real Housewives of Orange County episodes
Season	Episodes	Originally released		Average Viewers
Season	Episodes	First released	Last released	Average Viewers
1	8	March 21, 2006	May 9, 2006	—N/a
2	10	January 16, 2007	March 20, 2007	—N/a
3	12	November 6, 2007	January 29, 2008	1.50
4	15	November 25, 2008	June 11, 2009	2.17
5	17	November 5, 2009	March 11, 2010	—N/a
6	16	March 6, 2011	June 20, 2011	1.94
7	23	February 7, 2012	July 24, 2012	1.90
8	23	April 1, 2013	September 1, 2013	1.89
9	21	April 14, 2014	September 8, 2014	1.75
10	24	June 8, 2015	November 12, 2015	1.77
11	21	June 20, 2016	November 21, 2016	1.80
12	21	July 10, 2017	November 27, 2017	1.70
13	21	July 16, 2018	December 9, 2018	1.42
14	23	August 6, 2019	December 26, 2019	1.32
15	16	October 14, 2020	January 27, 2021	1.04
16	19	December 1, 2021	April 27, 2022	1.07
17	18	June 7, 2023	October 11, 2023	0.78
18	20	July 11, 2024	November 21, 2024	0.61
19	20	July 10, 2025	November 20, 2025	0.55
20	19	July 9, 2026	November 12, 2026	TBA

== Episodes ==
=== Season 1 (2006) ===
Kimberly Bryant, Jo De La Rosa, Vicki Gunvalson, Jeana Keough and Lauri Peterson are introduced as series regulars.

The Real Housewives of Orange County season 1 episodes
No. overall	No. in season	Title	Original release date	U.S. viewers (millions)
1	1	"Meet the Wives"	March 21, 2006	0.43
2	2	"Is It Hunting Season, Yet?"	March 28, 2006	N/A
3	3	"Upgrading Has Nothing to do With You Honey"	April 4, 2006	N/A
4	4	"Talk, Talk, Talk"	April 11, 2006	N/A
5	5	"Cut the P and Lem out of Problem and you get ROB"	April 18, 2006	N/A
6	6	"Shocking News"	April 25, 2006	N/A
7	7	"The Finale"	May 2, 2006	N/A
8	8	"Reunion"	May 9, 2006	N/A

=== Season 2 (2007) ===
Bryant departed as a series regular. Tammy Knickerbocker joined the cast.

The Real Housewives of Orange County season 2 episodes
No. overall	No. in season	Title	Original release date
9	1	"The Housewives are Back!"	January 16, 2007
10	2	"Be Nice to the New Girl"	January 23, 2007
11	3	"Watch Out Bitches!"	January 30, 2007
12	4	"Relationships Are Better Than Your Head"	February 6, 2007
13	5	"Stranger in Your House"	February 13, 2007
14	6	"Studio, Jewelry, and Babies"	February 20, 2007
15	7	"Jo Jo the Housewife"	February 27, 2007
16	8	"Birthday Sex"	March 6, 2007
17	9	"Finale"	March 13, 2007
18	10	"Real Housewives Confess: A Watch What Happens Special"	March 20, 2007

=== Season 3 (2007–2008) ===
De La Rosa departed as a series regular. Tamra Judge and Quinn Fry joined the cast.

The Real Housewives of Orange County season 3 episodes
No. overall	No. in season	Title	Original release date	U.S. viewers (millions)
19	1	"Behind the Orange Curtain"	November 6, 2007	N/A
20	2	"My Baby is All Grown Up"	November 13, 2007	N/A
21	3	"Girls Gone Wild"	November 20, 2007	N/A
22	4	"Pantry Raid!"	November 27, 2007	N/A
23	5	"Rebels Without a Cause"	December 4, 2007	N/A
24	6	"The Boys of Summer"	December 11, 2007	N/A
25	7	"Moving Violations"	December 18, 2007	N/A
26	8	"Family Vacation"	January 1, 2008	N/A
27	9	"Frienemies"	January 8, 2008	N/A
28	10	"Diamonds Are a Girl's Best Friend"	January 15, 2008	N/A
29	11	"Here Comes the Bride"	January 22, 2008	2.39
30	12	"Real Housewives Confess: A Watch What Happens Special"	January 29, 2008	1.33

=== Season 4 (2008–2009) ===
Knickerbocker and Fry departed as series regulars. Peterson departed as a series regular after episode 3. Gretchen Rossi and Lynne Curtin joined the cast.

The Real Housewives of Orange County season 4 episodes
No. overall	No. in season	Title	Original release date	U.S. viewers (millions)
31	1	"Are They For Real?"	November 25, 2008	N/A
32	2	"Hold on To Your Daddies"	December 2, 2008	N/A
33	3	"Love Tanks"	December 9, 2008	N/A
34	4	"You Just Don't Get It"	December 16, 2008	N/A
35	5	"120 in the Shade"	December 23, 2008	N/A
36	6	"Cut!"	December 30, 2008	N/A
37	7	"And They're Off..."	January 6, 2009	N/A
38	8	"Naked Wasted"	January 13, 2009	N/A
39	9	"Why Are You Being So Mean To Me?"	January 20, 2009	N/A
40	10	"The Girls Want to Come Out and Play"	January 27, 2009	N/A
41	11	"Vegas Baby"	February 3, 2009	N/A
42	12	"Who's Your Daddy?"	February 10, 2009	N/A
43	13	"Bling Bling"	February 17, 2009	2.00
44	14	"Real Housewives Confess: A Watch What Happens Special"	February 24, 2009	2.20
45	15	"The Lost Footage"	June 11, 2009	N/A

=== Season 5 (2009–2010) ===
Keough departed as a series regular after episode 3. Alexis Bellino joined the cast.

The Real Housewives of Orange County season 5 episodes
No. overall	No. in season	Title	Original release date
46	1	"When Times Get Tough, The Tough Go Shopping!"	November 5, 2009
47	2	"Friends, Enemies and Husbands"	November 12, 2009
48	3	"It Ends in Coto de Caza"	November 19, 2009
49	4	"It's All About Choices"	December 3, 2009
50	5	"Friends, Facelifts and Florida"	December 10, 2009
51	6	"All Girls Weekend"	December 17, 2009
52	7	"Love and War"	January 7, 2010
53	8	"Let Bygones, Be Bygones"	January 14, 2010
54	9	"No Boundaries"	January 21, 2010
55	10	"I Can't Stop"	January 28, 2010
56	11	"Nothing Is As It Seems"	February 4, 2010
57	12	"You Can Dish It, But You Can't Take It"	February 11, 2010
58	13	"Let's Bow Our Heads and Pray"	February 18, 2010
59	14	"This Is How We Do It in the O.C."	February 25, 2010
60	15	"Is This All There Is?"	March 4, 2010
61	16	"Reunion Special: Part 1"	March 10, 2010
62	17	"Reunion Special: Part 2"	March 11, 2010

=== Season 6 (2011) ===
Curtin departed as a series regular. Peggy Tanous joined the cast. Keough and Fernanda Rocha served in recurring capacities.

The Real Housewives of Orange County season 6 episodes
No. overall	No. in season	Title	Original release date	U.S. viewers (millions)
63	1	"Amped Blondes and Evil Eyes"	March 6, 2011	2.05
64	2	"Shameless in Seattle"	March 13, 2011	2.05
65	3	"A New Lease on Life"	March 20, 2011	1.77
66	4	"Body Shots"	March 27, 2011	1.79
67	5	"No Hate"	April 3, 2011	1.51
68	6	"What a Difference a Year Makes"	April 10, 2011	1.53
69	7	"Riches to Rags"	April 17, 2011	1.64
70	8	"Kiss and Tell"	April 24, 2011	1.68
71	9	"Whine Pairings"	May 1, 2011	2.03
72	10	"It's Not a Competition"	May 8, 2011	1.92
73	11	"Cutting Loose"	May 15, 2011	1.70
74	12	"Fashion Victim"	May 22, 2011	2.10
75	13	"Girl Fight"	June 5, 2011	2.87
76	14	"Reunion: Part 1"	June 12, 2011	2.32
77	15	"Reunion: Part 2"	June 13, 2011	2.53
78	16	"Lost Footage Special"	June 20, 2011	1.53

=== Season 7 (2012) ===
Tanous departed as a series regular. Heather Dubrow joined the cast. Sarah Winchester served in a recurring capacity.

The Real Housewives of Orange County season 7 episodes
No. overall	No. in season	Title	Original release date	U.S. viewers (millions)
79	1	"Stranger Things Have Happened"	February 7, 2012	2.26
80	2	"Southern Hospitality"	February 14, 2012	1.69
81	3	"The Honeymoon Is Over"	February 21, 2012	2.05
82	4	"Who's Laughing Now?"	February 28, 2012	1.66
83	5	"He Said What?"	March 6, 2012	1.81
84	6	"The Party's Over"	March 13, 2012	2.10
85	7	"Under The Knife"	March 20, 2012	2.05
86	8	"Dirty Housewives"	April 3, 2012	1.76
87	9	"Bowling For Champs"	April 10, 2012	1.85
88	10	"Cabin Fever"	April 17, 2012	1.77
89	11	"What's New, Pussycat?"	April 24, 2012	1.92
90	12	"Bombs Away"	May 1, 2012	2.04
91	13	"Whine & Cheese"	May 8, 2012	1.85
92	14	"Happily Never After"	May 15, 2012	1.91
93	15	"Scream Therapy"	May 22, 2012	1.91
94	16	"Rumble in the Jungle"	May 29, 2012	2.07
95	17	"Monkey Business"	June 5, 2012	1.88
96	18	"Will He or Won't He?"	June 12, 2012	1.77
97	19	"Let Them Eat Cake"	June 19, 2012	1.96
98	20	"Are You in or Out?"	June 26, 2012	2.50
99	21	"Reunion: Part 1"	July 10, 2012	2.51
100	22	"Reunion: Part 2"	July 16, 2012	1.94
101	23	"Lost Footage Special"	July 24, 2012	1.42

=== Season 8 (2013) ===
Lydia McLaughlin joined the cast. Peterson served in a recurring capacity.

The Real Housewives of Orange County season 8 episodes
No. overall	No. in season	Title	Original release date	U.S. viewers (millions)
102	1	"Bullies and Babies"	April 1, 2013	1.81
103	2	"Evil Eyes and Evil Faces"	April 8, 2013	1.59
104	3	"Making Up Is Hard to Do"	April 15, 2013	1.60
105	4	"It's My Party and I'll Scream if I Want to"	April 22, 2013	1.71
106	5	"The Party Is DONE!"	April 29, 2013	1.85
107	6	"A Star Is Reborn?"	May 6, 2013	1.96
108	7	"Whines by Wives"	May 13, 2013	1.81
109	8	"Hot in Orange County"	May 20, 2013	1.85
110	9	"Speech Therapy"	May 27, 2013	1.67
111	10	"Viva Mexico"	June 3, 2013	1.85
112	11	"Dirty Dancing in Mexico"	June 10, 2013	1.77
113	12	"Chicks and Salsa"	June 17, 2013	1.86
114	13	"100th Episode Special"	June 24, 2013	N/A
115	14	"Wedding Dress Stress"	July 1, 2013	1.96
116	15	"The Cold War"	July 8, 2013	2.16
117	16	"Hold Your Tongue"	July 15, 2013	1.99
118	17	"Crossroads"	July 22, 2013	2.03
119	18	"An Immodest Proposal"	July 29, 2013	2.00
120	19	"Cold Shoulders"	August 5, 2013	2.38
121	20	"Reunion: Part One"	August 12, 2013	2.12
122	21	"Reunion: Part Two"	August 19, 2013	2.08
123	22	"Reunion: Part Three"	August 26, 2013	2.30
124	23	"Secrets Revealed"	September 1, 2013	1.32

=== Season 9 (2014) ===
Rossi, Bellino, and McLaughlin departed as series regulars. Lizzie Rovsek and Shannon Storms Beador joined the cast. Danielle Gregorio served in a recurring capacity.

The Real Housewives of Orange County season 9 episodes
No. overall	No. in season	Title	Original release date	U.S. viewers (millions)
125	1	"Hawaii 5 Uh-Oh"	April 14, 2014	1.70
126	2	"Meet & Potatoes"	April 21, 2014	1.84
127	3	"Fakes-giving, Fake Friends"	April 28, 2014	1.71
128	4	"Pretty Ugly"	May 5, 2014	1.43
129	5	"I Couldn't Chair Less"	May 12, 2014	1.74
130	6	"Showdown at the Hoedown"	May 26, 2014	1.64
131	7	"Choke-Lahoma"	June 2, 2014	1.82
132	8	"Not So Silent Night"	June 9, 2014	1.62
133	9	"Not a Good Day LA"	June 16, 2014	1.64
134	10	"Skunk in the Barnyard"	June 23, 2014	1.86
135	11	"Making Woo-Hoo-Py"	June 30, 2014	1.77
136	12	"La-Bomb-A"	July 7, 2014	1.69
137	13	"Point Break"	July 14, 2014	1.72
138	14	"Fully Loaded"	July 21, 2014	1.68
139	15	"Valentines and Birthday Whines"	July 28, 2014	1.77
140	16	"Bali Highs & Lows"	August 4, 2014	1.97
141	17	"Eat, Pray, Run"	August 11, 2014	2.03
142	18	"All Apologies"	August 18, 2014	2.03
143	19	"Reunion Part One"	August 25, 2014	1.91
144	20	"Reunion Part Two"	September 1, 2014	2.03
145	21	"Secrets Revealed"	September 8, 2014	1.20

=== Season 10 (2015) ===
Rovsek departed as a series regular and appeared in a recurring capacity. Meghan King Edmonds joined the cast.

The Real Housewives of Orange County season 10 episodes
No. overall	No. in season	Title	Original release date	U.S. viewers (millions)
146	1	"Under Construction"	June 8, 2015	1.74
147	2	"Take a Swing"	June 15, 2015	1.40
148	3	"Whine Country"	June 22, 2015	1.66
149	4	"Charity Case"	June 29, 2015	1.62
150	5	"Game Changer"	July 6, 2015	1.99
151	6	"Full Circle"	July 13, 2015	1.75
152	7	"Bowling in Heels"	July 20, 2015	1.56
153	8	"Judgy Eyes & Tahitian Skies"	July 27, 2015	1.44
154	9	"Swimming With Sharks"	August 3, 2015	1.72
155	10	"Girl Code"	August 10, 2015	1.86
156	11	"A Psychic Surprise"	August 17, 2015	2.03
157	12	"Racing To The Truth"	August 24, 2015	1.80
158	13	"Sex, Lies and Leeches"	August 31, 2015	1.97
159	14	"A Storm Is Coming"	September 7, 2015	1.88
160	15	"Fire Signs"	September 14, 2015	1.99
161	16	"Suspicious Minds"	September 21, 2015	1.85
162	17	"Broken Records"	September 28, 2015	1.83
163	18	"Satan Loves Confusion"	October 5, 2015	1.73
164	19	"Baptism by Fire"	October 12, 2015	2.06
165	20	"Reunion Part One"	October 19, 2015	2.04
166	21	"Reunion Part Two"	October 26, 2015	2.35
167	22	"Reunion Part Three"	November 1, 2015	1.86
168	23	"Brooks Tells All"	November 12, 2015	1.17
169	24	"Secrets Revealed"	November 12, 2015	1.08

=== Season 11 (2016) ===
Kelly Dodd joined the cast.

The Real Housewives of Orange County season 11 episodes
No. overall	No. in season	Title	Original release date	U.S. viewers (millions)
170	1	"When the Ship Hits the Fan"	June 20, 2016	1.72
171	2	"Making Friends But Not Amends"	June 27, 2016	1.67
172	3	"Lies in the Air, Sand in My Hair"	July 11, 2016	1.62
173	4	"Frozen Assets"	July 18, 2016	1.79
174	5	"Boogie Fights"	July 25, 2016	1.80
175	6	"Frenemies of the State"	August 1, 2016	1.85
176	7	"Something's Fishy"	August 15, 2016	1.80
177	8	"Shannon Gets Her Groove Back"	August 22, 2016	1.81
178	9	"Woo Hoo Weekend"	August 29, 2016	1.91
179	10	"Shock and Roll"	September 5, 2016	2.01
180	11	"The Moral Minority"	September 12, 2016	1.97
181	12	"Stage Moms and Dropped Bombs"	September 19, 2016	1.75
182	13	"Bye, Bye Beadors"	September 26, 2016	1.44
183	14	"Secrets, Lies and Vicki's New Guy"	October 3, 2016	1.71
184	15	"Shamrocks and Shockwaves"	October 10, 2016	1.84
185	16	"Bringing Up Old Ghosts"	October 17, 2016	1.82
186	17	"Puppet Strings and Tamra's Wings"	October 24, 2016	1.87
187	18	"Vicious Lies and Broken Ties"	October 31, 2016	1.81
188	19	"Reunion Part 1"	November 7, 2016	1.85
189	20	"Reunion Part 2"	November 14, 2016	1.96
190	21	"Reunion Part 3"	November 21, 2016	1.71

=== Season 12 (2017) ===
Dubrow departed as a series regular. McLaughlin rejoined the cast as a series regular. Peggy Sulahian joined the cast.

The Real Housewives of Orange County season 12 episodes
No. overall	No. in season	Title	Original release date	U.S. viewers (millions)
191	1	"The Great Divide"	July 10, 2017	1.68
192	2	"It's Either My Way or the Feng Shui"	July 17, 2017	1.73
193	3	"The Not So Quiet Woman"	July 24, 2017	1.74
194	4	"We Have a New Puppet Master"	July 31, 2017	1.61
195	5	"Moving In, Moving On and Moving Fast"	August 7, 2017	1.60
196	6	"The Sip-N-See Stand Off"	August 14, 2017	1.66
197	7	"Un-Noble Women"	August 21, 2017	1.66
198	8	"Run for Your Wife"	August 28, 2017	1.77
199	9	"Drag Bingo Bombshell"	September 4, 2017	1.69
200	10	"Loose Lips Sink Friendships"	September 11, 2017	1.63
201	11	"Breast Intentions"	September 18, 2017	1.72
202	12	"Farm-to-Table Manners"	September 25, 2017	1.59
203	13	"Don't Rock the Boat"	October 2, 2017	1.73
204	14	"Armenian Rhapsody"	October 9, 2017	1.78
205	15	"Mystic Mistake"	October 16, 2017	1.54
206	16	"An Unexpected Thaw"	October 23, 2017	1.79
207	17	"A Case of the Vickis"	October 30, 2017	1.65
208	18	"The Real Vikings of Orange County"	November 6, 2017	1.56
209	19	"Candle Wicks and Lunatics"	November 13, 2017	1.73
210	20	"Reunion Part 1"	November 20, 2017	1.87
211	21	"Reunion Part 2"	November 27, 2017	1.89

=== Season 13 (2018) ===
McLaughlin, King Edmonds, and Sulahian departed as series regulars. Gina Kirschenheiter and Emily Simpson joined the cast.

The Real Housewives of Orange County season 13 episodes
No. overall	No. in season	Title	Original release date	U.S. viewers (millions)
212	1	"The Next Chapter"	July 16, 2018	1.41
213	2	"One Apology, Another Betrayal"	July 23, 2018	1.46
214	3	"Tres Amigas"	July 30, 2018	1.41
215	4	"Judge, Jury and Gina"	August 6, 2018	1.35
216	5	"Orange County Hold 'Em"	August 13, 2018	1.52
217	6	"Rumors"	August 20, 2018	1.42
218	7	"She Said/She Said"	August 27, 2018	1.50
219	8	"Seeing Red"	September 10, 2018	1.55
220	9	"A Peace Treaty, a Blind Date, and a Divorce No One Understands"	September 17, 2018	1.54
221	10	"Italian Fight Night"	September 24, 2018	1.32
222	11	"8 1/2 Minutes of Success"	October 1, 2018	1.36
223	12	"Nice to Meet You... Again"	October 8, 2018	1.27
224	13	"Heat Waves and Hot Flashes"	October 15, 2018	1.31
225	14	"Blow Up"	October 22, 2018	1.44
226	15	"The Day After"	October 29, 2018	1.35
227	16	"Twin Tweaks"	November 5, 2018	1.34
228	17	"Friends and Enemas"	November 12, 2018	1.45
229	18	"Femme Finale"	November 19, 2018	1.18
230	19	"Reunion Part 1"	November 25, 2018	1.51
231	20	"Reunion Part 2"	December 2, 2018	1.71
232	21	"Reunion Part 3"	December 9, 2018	1.47

=== Season 14 (2019) ===
Gunvalson departed as a series regular and appeared in a recurring capacity. Braunwyn Windham-Burke joined the cast.

The Real Housewives of Orange County season 14 episodes
No. overall	No. in season	Title	Original release date	U.S. viewers (millions)
233	1	"New Friends, New Flames"	August 6, 2019	1.42
234	2	"(Not So Happy) Housewarming"	August 13, 2019	1.44
235	3	"All Aboard the Rumor Train"	August 20, 2019	1.48
236	4	"Breakdown in Beverly Hills"	August 27, 2019	1.46
237	5	"Liar, Liar, Friendship on Fire"	September 3, 2019	1.43
238	6	"Family Affair"	September 10, 2019	1.34
239	7	"Dance Like No One Is Watching"	September 17, 2019	1.40
240	8	"Let's Get Metaphysical"	September 24, 2019	1.38
241	9	"Miracle at Miraval"	October 1, 2019	1.35
242	10	"Big O's and Broken Toes"	October 8, 2019	1.40
243	11	"Hot Mess Express"	October 15, 2019	1.26
244	12	"Fashion Show Faux Pas"	October 22, 2019	1.37
245	13	"Spilling Tea and Throwing Shade"	October 29, 2019	1.33
246	14	"Best Frenemies Forever"	November 5, 2019	1.28
247	15	"The Orange Doesn't Fall Far From the Tree"	November 12, 2019	1.36
248	16	"Viral Videos and Vendettas"	November 19, 2019	1.22
249	17	"Florida Fun and Fury"	November 26, 2019	1.35
250	18	"Wild, Wild Key West"	December 3, 2019	1.38
251	19	"Some Fences are Made to Be Broken"	December 10, 2019	1.34
252	20	"Whooping It Up for Wedding Bells"	December 17, 2019	1.24
253	21	"Reunion Part 1"	December 18, 2019	0.93
254	22	"Reunion Part 2"	December 23, 2019	1.12
255	23	"Reunion Part 3"	December 26, 2019	1.02

=== Season 15 (2020–2021) ===
Judge departed as a series regular. Elizabeth Lyn Vargas joined the cast.

The Real Housewives of Orange County season 15 episodes
No. overall	No. in season	Title	Original release date	U.S. viewers (millions)
256	1	"An Unexpected Secret"	October 14, 2020	1.05
257	2	"Tequila Truth Serum"	October 21, 2020	1.11
258	3	"The Splash Heard Round the OC"	October 28, 2020	1.00
259	4	"The Aftershock"	November 4, 2020	1.01
260	5	"An Unexpected Guest"	November 11, 2020	1.09
261	6	"The Vow Renewal"	November 18, 2020	1.06
262	7	"Renewals and Regrets"	November 25, 2020	0.98
263	8	"The Calm Before the Storm"	December 2, 2020	1.12
264	9	"The Lies That Bind"	December 9, 2020	1.08
265	10	"The Great OC Escape"	December 16, 2020	1.00
266	11	"A Submerged Secret"	December 23, 2020	1.03
267	12	"The Unmasking of Elizabeth Vargas"	December 30, 2020	1.02
268	13	"Trouble in Newport Beach"	January 6, 2021	0.82
269	14	"Making Waves"	January 13, 2021	1.01
270	15	"Reunion Part 1"	January 20, 2021	1.08
271	16	"Reunion Part 2"	January 27, 2021	1.10

=== Season 16 (2021–2022) ===
Dodd, Windham-Burke, and Lyn Vargas departed as series regulars. Dubrow rejoined the cast as a series regular. Jen Armstrong and Noella Bergener joined the cast. Nicole James served in a recurring capacity.

The Real Housewives of Orange County season 16 episodes
No. overall	No. in season	Title	Original release date	U.S. viewers (millions)
272	1	"Fancy Pants Is Back"	December 1, 2021	1.07
273	2	"Loose Lips and Lawsuits"	December 8, 2021	1.05
274	3	"Gone Guy"	December 15, 2021	1.03
275	4	"Judge & Jury"	December 22, 2021	1.04
276	5	"A Tele-Noella"	January 5, 2022	0.98
277	6	"Straight Questions, Straight-ish Answers"	January 12, 2022	1.00
278	7	"Wild Cards"	January 19, 2022	0.98
279	8	"Sweat, Lies, and Pornography"	February 2, 2022	0.97
280	9	"Runaway Husband"	February 9, 2022	1.01
281	10	"Edible Derangements"	February 16, 2022	0.95
282	11	"Wined, Dined and Ryned"	March 2, 2022	0.93
283	12	"Apples and Oranges"	March 9, 2022	0.94
284	13	"Mind Blown"	March 16, 2022	1.02
285	14	"The Exorcism of Gina"	March 23, 2022	0.97
286	15	"When in Aspen..."	March 30, 2022	1.00
287	16	"Mountain of Lies"	April 6, 2022	0.98
288	17	"A Band of Housewives"	April 13, 2022	1.07
289	18	"Reunion Part 1"	April 20, 2022	1.08
290	19	"Reunion Part 2"	April 27, 2022	1.07

=== Season 17 (2023) ===
Armstrong and Bergener departed as series regulars. Judge rejoined the cast as a series regular. Jenn Pedranti joined the cast. Taylor Armstrong served in a recurring capacity.

The Real Housewives of Orange County season 17 episodes
No. overall	No. in season	Title	Original release date	U.S. viewers (millions)
291	1	"Here Comes The Judge"	June 7, 2023	1.03
292	2	"Friendship Overboard"	June 14, 2023	0.79
293	3	"We Cut It Close(ed)"	June 21, 2023	0.76
294	4	"You Can't DB Serious"	June 28, 2023	0.78
295	5	"Campfire Confessions"	July 5, 2023	0.72
296	6	"Big Trouble in Big Sky"	July 12, 2023	0.78
297	7	"Oh Nobu You Didn't"	July 19, 2023	0.67
298	8	"Backyard Bikini Clash"	July 26, 2023	0.77
299	9	"Loose Lips and Relationships"	August 2, 2023	0.81
300	10	"A Doppelgänger Disaster"	August 9, 2023	0.73
301	11	"It's My Fiesta and I'll Cry If I Want To"	August 23, 2023	0.74
302	12	"Pumpkins & Paparazzi"	August 30, 2023	0.72
303	13	"Big News, Bigger Secret"	September 6, 2023	0.68
304	14	"Viva La Tres Amigas"	September 13, 2023	0.80
305	15	"The Tipping Point"	September 20, 2023	0.82
306	16	"Welcome to the Freak Show"	September 27, 2023	0.78
307	17	"Reunion Part 1"	October 4, 2023	0.83
308	18	"Reunion Part 2"	October 11, 2023	0.82

=== Season 18 (2024) ===
Katie Ginella joined the cast. Bellino served in a recurring capacity.

The Real Housewives of Orange County season 18 episodes
No. overall	No. in season	Title	Original release date	U.S. viewers (millions)
309	1	"Exes and OCs"	July 11, 2024	0.65
310	2	"Rent and Reputations"	July 18, 2024	0.65
311	3	"Red Flags and Flag Football"	July 25, 2024	0.60
312	4	"Not My Cup of Tee"	August 1, 2024	0.62
313	5	"Dinner Party Disaster"	August 8, 2024	0.67
314	6	"All Up in Gina's Grill"	August 15, 2024	0.75
315	7	"The Gloves Are Off"	August 22, 2024	0.52
316	8	"Once a Traitor, Always a Traitor"	August 29, 2024	0.68
317	9	"A Picture Worth a Thousand Words"	September 5, 2024	0.61
318	10	"Catwalks & Catfights"	September 12, 2024	0.65
319	11	"Singled Out"	September 19, 2024	0.58
320	12	"The Elephant in the Room"	September 26, 2024	0.54
321	13	"You Are Cordially Not Invited"	October 3, 2024	0.54
322	14	"High Tea & High Tension"	October 10, 2024	0.55
323	15	"Double Decker Drama"	October 17, 2024	0.56
324	16	"Sunday Roasted"	October 24, 2024	0.64
325	17	"Unfinished Business"	October 31, 2024	0.56
326	18	"Reunion Part 1"	November 7, 2024	0.67
327	19	"Reunion Part 2"	November 14, 2024	0.57
328	20	"Reunion Part 3"	November 21, 2024	0.60

=== Season 19 (2025) ===
Rossi served in a recurring capacity.

The Real Housewives of Orange County season 19 episodes
No. overall	No. in season	Title	Original release date	U.S. viewers (millions)
329	1	"Revolving Door of Lies"	July 10, 2025	0.52
330	2	"Old Faces, New Places"	July 17, 2025	0.51
331	3	"Knee Deep in Lies"	July 24, 2025	0.55
332	4	"Judge, Jury and Jenn"	July 31, 2025	0.55
333	5	"The Big Uneasy"	August 7, 2025	0.48
334	6	"What Voodoo You Do?"	August 14, 2025	0.48
335	7	"The Truth Will Not Set You Free"	August 21, 2025	0.55
336	8	"Truth Tellers & Lie Detectors"	August 28, 2025	0.61
337	9	"Life's a Beach... and Then You Cry"	September 4, 2025	0.58
338	10	"Whine or Champagne?"	September 11, 2025	0.54
339	11	"Loose Lips Sink Trips"	September 18, 2025	0.57
340	12	"Defense Is the Best Offense"	September 25, 2025	0.51
341	13	"Not So Funfetti"	October 2, 2025	0.55
342	14	"Hoedown Throwdown"	October 9, 2025	0.57
343	15	"Going Dutch"	October 16, 2025	0.54
344	16	"Tulip Service"	October 23, 2025	0.54
345	17	"A Source of Discontent"	October 30, 2025	0.58
346	18	"Reunion Part 1"	November 6, 2025	0.67
347	19	"Reunion Part 2"	November 13, 2025	0.56
348	20	"Reunion Part 3"	November 20, 2025	0.60

=== Season 20 (2026) ===
Ginella departed as a series regular. Gunvalson rejoined the cast as a series regular. Carmella Garcia joined the cast.

The Real Housewives of Orange County season 20 episodes
No. overall	No. in season	Title	Rating (18–49)	Original release date	U.S. viewers (millions)
349	1	"Old Friends, New Era"	0.10	July 9, 2026	0.63
350	2	"Not on My Bingo Card"	0.10	July 16, 2026	0.58
351	3	"Why Can't We Be Friends?"	0.08	July 23, 2026	0.51
352	4	"Boxed In"	TBA	July 30, 2026	N/A
353	5	"Designers and Dildos"	TBA	August 6, 2026	N/A
354	6	"Suite & Sour"	TBA	August 13, 2026	N/A
355	7	"All Bets Are Off"	TBA	August 20, 2026	N/A
356	8	"Sangria, Songria"	TBA	August 27, 2026	N/A
357	9	"Ring of Truth"	TBA	September 3, 2026	N/A
358	10	"Forbidden Fruit"	TBA	September 10, 2026	N/A
359	11	"A Tale of Two Trips"	TBA	September 17, 2026	N/A
360	12	"Lei It on Me"	TBA	September 24, 2026	N/A
361	13	"Don't Look Now"	TBA	October 1, 2026	N/A
362	14	"Friends and Fortunes"	TBA	October 8, 2026	N/A
363	15	"For Goodness Sake"	TBA	October 15, 2026	N/A
364	16	"Mad Money"	TBA	October 22, 2026	TBD
365	17	"Reach for the SKYtops"	TBA	October 29, 2026	TBD
366	18	"Reunion Part 1"	TBA	November 5, 2026	TBD
367	19	"Reunion Part 2"	TBA	November 12, 2026	TBD
