= The Real Housewives of Orange County season 12 =

Season of television series

The Real Housewives of Orange County
- Season 12
- Cover used by the iTunes Store; Top to bottom (left to right): Sulahian, Judge, McLaughlin, King Edmonds, Gunvalson, Dodd and Beador
- Starring: Vicki Gunvalson; Tamra Judge; Lydia McLaughlin; Shannon Storms Beador; Meghan King Edmonds; Kelly Dodd; Peggy Sulahian
- No. of episodes: 21

Release
- Original network: Bravo
- Original release: July 10 – November 27, 2017

Season chronology
- ← Previous; Season 11 Next → Season 13

The twelfth season of The Real Housewives of Orange County, an American reality television series, is broadcast on Bravo. It aired from July 10, 2017, until November 27, 2017 and is primarily filmed in Orange County, California. Its executive producers are Adam Karpel, Alex Baskin, Douglas Ross, Gregory Stewart, Scott Dunlop, Stephanie Boyriven and Andy Cohen.

The twelfth season of The Real Housewives of Orange County focuses on the lives of Vicki Gunvalson, Tamra Judge, Lydia McLaughlin, Shannon Storms Beador, Meghan King Edmonds, Kelly Dodd and Peggy Sulahian.

This season marked the final regular appearances of Lydia McLaughlin, who departed a second time and Meghan King Edmonds. It also marked the only regular appearance of Peggy Sulahian.

== Production and crew ==
In April 2017, the series was officially renewed for its twelfth season. Adam Karpel, Alex Baskin, Douglas Ross, Gregory Stewart, Scott Dunlop, Stephanie Boyriven and Andy Cohen are recognized as the series' executive producers; it is produced and distributed by Evolution Media.

== Cast and synopsis ==
In January 2017, Heather Dubrow announced her departure from the series, after five seasons. In May 2017, it was announced former housewife Lydia McLaughlin would return. In June 2017, it was announced Gunvalson, Judge, Beador, King Edmonds and Dodd would return, alongside new housewife Peggy Sulahian. Former housewives Gretchen Rossi, Lizzie Rovsek and Jeana Keough made guest appearances.

== Episodes ==
The Real Housewives of Orange County season 12 episodes
No. overall	No. in season	Title	Original release date	U.S. viewers (millions)
191	1	"The Great Divide"	July 10, 2017	1.68
Vicki is busy expanding her business, Tamra is reuniting with an old friend, while Shannon struggles with her weight. Meghan is back in OC after the birth of baby Aspen. Returning housewife Lydia is determined to bring Tamra and Vicki back together.
192	2	"It's Either My Way or the Feng Shui"	July 17, 2017	1.73
Shannon enlists the help of her feng shui expert. Lydia’s magazine features Peggy, whose life may look perfect but not everything that glitters is gold. Tamra plans a birthday party for her granddaughter, where tempers fly between Lydia and Shannon.
193	3	"The Not So Quiet Woman"	July 24, 2017	1.74
Vicki struggles with trust issues as she sets up her new office, while Peggy and her family deal with her upcoming surgery. Tamra is thrust back into her role as the “Rodney King of the OC.” Shannon comes face to face with her nemesis Kelly Dodd.
194	4	"We Have a New Puppet Master"	July 31, 2017	1.61
While the fallout from The Quiet Woman leaves Shannon and Kelly both stunned, the ladies move on with their lives as Shannon takes her daughter Sophie out for a driving lesson and Kelly looks to improve her love life from the inside out. Lydia's mom throws a birthday party for her grandson, where Vicki forms an instant bond with new housewife Peggy. Tamra looks to break the cycle of parental alienation and divorce in her family.
195	5	"Moving In, Moving On and Moving Fast"	August 7, 2017	1.60
Tamra and Shannon come face to face. Lydia's family takes a vacation full of uncomfortable conversations. Vicki meddles in her son's love life. Peggy invites her friends to the unveiling of her Lamborghini.
196	6	"The Sip-N-See Stand Off"	August 14, 2017	1.66
Vicki tries to balance her life alongside her relationship with Steve. Lydia plans a launch party for her new magazine. Tamra organizes a sit down for Kelly and Shannon. Meghan hosts a Sip-N-See for baby Aspen where all of the ladies will finally be in the same place for the first time in months.
197	7	"Un-Noble Women"	August 21, 2017	1.66
After all the women finally came face to face at Meghan's Sip-N-See, Lydia is hopeful everyone can get along for her magazine's launch party. Tamra struggles with the scars of her broken family and her mom's poor communication skills. Lydia is hopeful Vicki and Tamra can agree to meet and find peace, but when Tamra thinks Peggy is overstepping her bounds, things end up not so noble at the Nobleman launch party.
198	8	"Run for Your Wife"	August 28, 2017	1.77
Vicki gets green with envy when she learns that Kelly is planning on celebrating St. Patrick's Day with Shannon and Meghan. Peggy learns that something got lost in translation between her and Tamra. Lydia ponders if her son's prophecy will come true as she competes in a Spartan Race. Meghan hopes eyes will be a smilin' upon Shannon and Kelly as they engage in a heavy pour of whiskey and whimsy.
199	9	"Drag Bingo Bombshell"	September 4, 2017	1.69
Kelly suspects her new pal Shannon of being up to her old tricks and confides in Meghan. Meghan puts her detective hat back on to investigate Vicki's issues with Shannon and Tamra. Vicki's looking to move forward with her new love, while Peggy takes her daughter to New York. The ladies attend a Drag Bingo event, where Lydia faces a moral dilemma and old arguments spark anew.
200	10	"Loose Lips Sink Friendships"	September 11, 2017	1.63
Meghan is still reeling from Kelly's attack. Lydia tries to play mediator but is unable to stay impartial. Tamra gets an unexpected phone call that leaves her wondering if there is still hope for her and Vicki. Peggy prepares to send her daughters off to college. Shannon celebrates her birthday. Vicki throws a party for her birthday and an old friend reveals some details about Eddie's past.
201	11	"Breast Intentions"	September 18, 2017	1.72
As rumors swirl following Vicki’s birthday party, Tamra catches wind of what transpired. Kelly is having a breast reduction and decided to have a “Boobs Voyage Party.” All hell breaks loose when Tamra and Vicki finally talk face to face.
202	12	"Farm-to-Table Manners"	September 25, 2017	1.59
Kelly goes into her surgery with the support of her husband. Tamra shares with Meghan her concern over Shannon's behavior. Vicki and Shannon visit Kelly while she recovers. Shannon invites Tamra, Meghan, Kelly and Peggy out to dinner where Peggy defiantly defeats a deluge of digs from Kelly. Lydia calls Tamra to invite her to Doug's Balls Voyage party, but finds out that her invite to Shannon's dinner was apparently lost at sea.
203	13	"Don't Rock the Boat"	October 2, 2017	1.73
Lydia throws Doug a party and invites all the ladies despite her hurt feelings over being left out of Shannon's dinner. Peggy is infuriated when David questions Diko about her health. Easter arrives in the OC and Shannon looks to her mom for advice about her marriage with David. Vicki decides to call Tamra to finally meet and end their feud once and for all.
204	14	"Armenian Rhapsody"	October 9, 2017	1.78
Vicki and Tamra finally come face-to-face. Lydia discovers the joys of when the rich get richer. Kelly's dad comes to town and she discovers the parallels between her parents' dysfunctional relationship and her own. Peggy and Diko celebrate their wedding anniversary with the ultimate party while Shannon faces the consequences of her husband's actions.
205	15	"Mystic Mistake"	October 16, 2017	1.54
While Vicki visits her cardiologist, Shanon and Peggy are still simmering about the cancer questioning that took place with their husbands. Lydia and Doug plan an Iceland trip and Doug encourages Lydia to invite her friends at Meghan's dinner party. All hell breaks loose when Peggy confronts Shannon about David. Shannon wakes up regretful for how unraveled she became with Peggy and confesses to Tamra about the current state of her marriage.
206	16	"An Unexpected Thaw"	October 23, 2017	1.79
The ladies of Orange County are ready to explore everything in Iceland from hiking a glacier to sampling the exotic cuisine. While Tamra and Vicki seem to be reconnecting, Lydia and Tamra hit a bump in their friendship. After a long day of activities the ladies are faced with a shocking medical emergency.
207	17	"A Case of the Vickis"	October 30, 2017	1.65
Vicki's health scare continues and brings out a side of Peggy that shocks the ladies. Later, a broken friendship might finally be on the path to mending, while a drunken night causes fractures in another.
208	18	"The Real Vikings of Orange County"	November 6, 2017	1.56
After being hurt by Kelly's words, Peggy reveals a secret video to Lydia. Meanwhile, the rest of the ladies whoop it up at a Viking dinner where Tamra and Vicki continue to get along, much to the dismay of Shannon. When Peggy finally arrives at the dinner, her preemptive strike on Meghan thoroughly backfires. Once everyone returns to the OC, Shannon discovers the nature of her unbalanced behavior, but also finds her marriage on thin ice.
209	19	"Candle Wicks and Lunatics"	November 13, 2017	1.73
Vicki surprises her son Michael with a new role at Coto Financial, while Kelly complains to her mother that she's finally at a breaking point in her marriage. Tamra fulfills her greatest wish of attending her estranged daughter's high school graduation. The ladies celebrate the launch of Meghan's new candle line and Peggy finally comes face-to-face with all the women after her sudden departure in Iceland.
210	20	"Reunion Part 1"	November 20, 2017	1.87
The First Ladies of Bravo are reunited and Lydia is in the hot seat and taken to task for outspoken opinions and actions. Vicki gives an update on her relationship with Steve, while Kelly and Shannon open up about the state of their marriages.
211	21	"Reunion Part 2"	November 27, 2017	1.89
The reunion continues with Kelly and Meghan reviving their text message feud. Peggy airs her grievances to Shannon, and an unexpected turn of events leaves everyone in state of total shock.
