= The Real Housewives of Orange County season 18 =

The Real Housewives of Orange County
- Season 18
- Promotional poster via Peacock
- Starring: Tamra Judge; Heather Dubrow; Shannon Storms Beador; Gina Kirschenheiter; Emily Simpson; Jennifer Pedranti; Katie Ginella
- No. of episodes: 20

Release
- Original network: Bravo
- Original release: July 11 – November 21, 2024

Season chronology
- ← Previous; Season 17 Next → Season 19

The eighteenth season of the American reality television series, The Real Housewives of Orange County, premiered on July 11, 2024, on Bravo and concluded on November 21, 2024. It was primarily filmed in Orange County, California. Its executive producers are Douglas Ross, Alex Baskin, Thomas Kelly, Brian McCarthy, Apryl Richards, Scott Dunlop and Andy Cohen.

The Real Housewives of Orange County focuses on the lives of Tamra Judge, Heather Dubrow, Shannon Storms Beador, Gina Kirschenheiter, Emily Simpson, Jennifer Pedranti and Katie Ginella, with Alexis Bellino appearing as a friend of the housewives.

== Production and crew ==
Filming for the eighteenth season began in January 2024 and concluded in April 2024. In June 2024, it was announced the season would premiere on July 11, 2024. New housewife, Katie Ginella, joined the show with former housewife Alexis Bellino returning after a ten year hiatus as a Friend of the Housewives throughout the season. Former housewife, Vicki Gunvalson, made several guest appearances during the season, along with former cast members Elizabeth Lyn Vargas and Jo De La Rosa, and The Real Housewives of Beverly Hills cast members Teddi Mellencamp Arroyave and Sutton Stracke.

== Episodes ==
The Real Housewives of Orange County season 18 episodes
No. overall	No. in season	Title	Original release date	U.S. viewers (millions)
309	1	"Exes and OCs"	July 11, 2024	0.65
310	2	"Rent and Reputations"	July 18, 2024	0.65
311	3	"Red Flags and Flag Football"	July 25, 2024	0.60
312	4	"Not My Cup of Tee"	August 1, 2024	0.62
313	5	"Dinner Party Disaster"	August 8, 2024	0.67
314	6	"All Up in Gina's Grill"	August 15, 2024	0.75
315	7	"The Gloves Are Off"	August 22, 2024	0.52
316	8	"Once a Traitor, Always a Traitor"	August 29, 2024	0.68
317	9	"A Picture Worth a Thousand Words"	September 5, 2024	0.61
318	10	"Catwalks & Catfights"	September 12, 2024	0.65
319	11	"Singled Out"	September 19, 2024	0.58
320	12	"The Elephant in the Room"	September 26, 2024	0.54
321	13	"You Are Cordially Not Invited"	October 3, 2024	0.54
322	14	"High Tea & High Tension"	October 10, 2024	0.55
323	15	"Double Decker Drama"	October 17, 2024	0.56
324	16	"Sunday Roasted"	October 24, 2024	0.64
325	17	"Unfinished Business"	October 31, 2024	0.56
326	18	"Reunion Part 1"	November 7, 2024	0.67
327	19	"Reunion Part 2"	November 14, 2024	0.57
328	20	"Reunion Part 3"	November 21, 2024	0.60
