= The Real Housewives of Orange County season 11 =

The Real Housewives of Orange County
- Season 11
- Cover used by iTunes (Left to right) Dodd, Beador, Gunvalson, Judge, Dubrow, and Edmonds
- Starring: Vicki Gunvalson; Tamra Judge; Heather Dubrow; Shannon Storms Beador; Meghan King Edmonds; Kelly Dodd
- No. of episodes: 21

Release
- Original network: Bravo
- Original release: June 20 – November 21, 2016

Season chronology
- ← Previous; Season 10 Next → Season 12

The eleventh season of The Real Housewives of Orange County, an American reality television series, is broadcast on Bravo. It aired June 20, 2016, until November 21, 2016, and is primarily filmed in Orange County, California. Its executive producers are Adam Karpel, Alex Baskin, Douglas Ross, Gregory Stewart, Scott Dunlop, Stephanie Boyriven and Andy Cohen.

The Real Housewives of Orange County focuses on the lives of Vicki Gunvalson, Tamra Judge, Heather Dubrow, Shannon Storms Beador, Meghan King Edmonds and Kelly Dodd. It consisted of 21 episodes

This season marked the first departure of Heather Dubrow. She eventually returned for the show's 16th season.

== Production and crew ==
The renewal of the eleventh season of The Real Housewives of Orange County was announced in April 2016. In May 2016, the official premier date, cast and trailer were revealed. The season premiere "When the Ship Hits the Fan" was aired on June 20, 2016. while the eighteenth episode "Vicious Lies and Broken Ties" served as the season finale, and was aired on October 31, 2016. It was followed by a three-part reunion that aired on November 7, November, 14 and November 21, 2016, which marked the conclusion of the season. Adam Karpel, Alex Baskin, Douglas Ross, Gregory Stewart, Scott Dunlop, Stephanie Boyriven and Andy Cohen are recognized as the series' executive producers; it is produced and distributed by Evolution Media.

== Cast and synopsis ==
All five wives featured on the tenth season returned for season eleven. Season ten recurring cast member and former housewife, Lizzie Rovsek departed the series and did not return for season eleven. Joining the series in the eleventh season is Kelly Dodd, an Arizona native who's a stay-at home mom currently working through her marital issues. Dodd is described as "bold and brash" as well as "her fiery Latin lineage and unfiltered opinions definitely bring the heat to the OC."

Vicki Gunvalson attempts to mend the fractured friendship from last year's drama regarding Brooks Ayers. Tamra Judge and Heather Dubrow reluctantly accept Gunvalson's apologies however Shannon Beador is less receptive with mending the friendship. Vicki's daughter moves back to Orange County from Oklahoma after Gunvalson buys her a home. The return isn't all it's meant to be as Briana recovers from surgery and Gunvalson's grandmother duties are on overdrive. Judge feels in the middle of her son Ryan's relationship with Sarah and attempts to salvage it. Dubrow continues with the construction of her home and she also continues to struggles with her workaholic husband and his inability to step away from work. The Dubrow family take a trip to Turks and Caicos to reconnect however once home the children still notice the distance. Dubrow gives Terry some tough advice and her opinion on his choices. Dubrow balances home and business as and launches her new book. The evening Dodd is introduced to the other wives through Edmonds, on Dubrow's boat party, she feels Beador is quite reserved and slightly judgmental. After connecting with Gunvalson at the party, Dodd and Vicki start to connect despite Edmonds warnings. After an argument with Beador, Edmonds give Dodd some tough love. Beador relishes in her marriage being the most solid it has been in years and continues to build on it. Strengthening their marriage, Beador's husband David surprises Beador with a vow renewal ceremony. The Beadors look for a new home. At Beador's 1970s-themed party, Beador gets into a huge argument with Dodd about rumors of the past. At the same party, Beador's husband finds himself in an argument with Gunvalson, also arguing about the past. Despite attempts of reconciliation, the two wives continue to feud. The behavior Dodd displayed during one of her and Beador's arguments has Dubrow not wanting to associate with Dodd ever again but Judge is determined to have the two work out their differences. Meghan King Edmonds begins IVF however it's her mum by her side instead of her husband due to his work commitments. During her IVF treatment, Edmonds seeks out support from Dodd and Dubrow, who have also gone through IVF. Edmonds begins the renovations on her new Orange County home.

== Episodes ==
The Real Housewives of Orange County season 11 episodes
No. overall	No. in season	Title	Original release date	U.S. viewers (millions)
170	1	"When the Ship Hits the Fan"	June 20, 2016	1.72
A new year begins with Shannon looking to move into a new home, as her marriage is feeling a lot more secure. Heather's home is progressing nicely but it seems her marriage is developing some issues. Meghan starts in vitro fertilization (IVF), but it's her mum by her side as her husband has work commitments. Heather hosts a boat party, inviting Vicki who still has damaged friendships with the other wives. Vicki attempts to mend her friendships at the party where a new wife, Kelly, is introduced by Meghan.
171	2	"Making Friends But Not Amends"	June 27, 2016	1.67
Heather enjoys a getaway with her family in Turk and Caicos as Tamra tries to salvage her son's relationship. Despite what she has heard from Meghan, Kelly attempts to befriend Vicki. Meghan hosts a demolition party to demolish her kitchen, however Kelly drops a bomb when she reveals she has befriended Vicki to the other ladies who still have unresolved issues with her.
172	3	"Lies in the Air, Sand in My Hair"	July 11, 2016	1.62
Vicki's wishes are granted as her daughter Briana moves back to Orange Country from Oklahoma, however it is not all Vicki hoped it would be. Meghan struggles with her fear of needles as her IVF treatment begins. Kelly throws a beach party to get to know the other ladies, at the part Vicki and Tamra attempts to resolve their issues that have transpired over the past year.
173	4	"Frozen Assets"	July 18, 2016	1.79
Vicki and Tamra's showdown continues, causing Kelly to move her beach bash inside. Meghan continues to takes steps to creating a family of her own. Brianna has a medical emergency, causing her to end up in hospital and Shannon makes a decision regarding Vicki.
174	5	"Boogie Fights"	July 25, 2016	1.80
Shannon hosts a 1970s-themed party where Shannon and Kelly get into a tense argument about rumors of Kelly's past. Vicki finds time in her busy schedule of work, babysitting her grandson and nursing Brianna back to health to have fun with some of the ladies. Heather addresses her concerns on Terry working too much. Tamra steps in to help Kelly mend some relationships, but things don't go to plan when she ends up stirring the pot instead.
175	6	"Frenemies of the State"	August 1, 2016	1.85
Following her party, Shannon pays a visit to Dr. Moon to remove toxins; Kelly tries to make amends by inviting Shannon to sit down and discuss the night of the party; Meghan travels to Washington, D.C., to speak on behalf of colorectal cancer.
176	7	"Something's Fishy"	August 15, 2016	1.80
The night before Heather's book launch, she endeavors to balance work and life; meanwhile Vicki celebrates her family's return to Orange County. Kelly continues to feel set up by Shannon, and seeks refuge with Vicki over their shared anger. Tamra hosts a sushi party for Meghan, before she gets pregnant, but all doesn't go to plan when Kelly crosses the line.
177	8	"Shannon Gets Her Groove Back"	August 22, 2016	1.81
Heather and Tamra discuss Kelly's behavior from the sushi night while Kelly turns to Meghan for support. Later, Shannon celebrates a surprise birthday event surrounded by those she loves, and Vicki and Kelly bond over being the odd women out at their own party.
178	9	"Woo Hoo Weekend"	August 29, 2016	1.91
Shannon and her husband head to Cabo for their second honeymoon. Heather and Terry have a dinner date that turns to them discussing Heather's issues with Kelly and Terry's issues with his busy schedule. Tamra steps in to Heather and Kelly's drama by arranging a meeting between the two, to sort out their difference before their trip to Glamis.
179	10	"Shock and Roll"	September 5, 2016	2.01
Eddie's birthday is celebrated at a motor-sports mecca, but Kelly's filthy mouth stirs up tension. The ladies explore sand dunes, leading to an unforgettable ride. In the OC, Meghan receives results from a pregnancy test, and Shannon's home is sold.
180	11	"The Moral Minority"	September 12, 2016	1.97
The ladies regroup following an accident, and new alliances are forged. Also: Tamra considers postponing her fitness competition; Meghan heads to Vicki's house to make amends; and Shannon tries to repair torn friendships.
181	12	"Stage Moms and Dropped Bombs"	September 19, 2016	1.75
Shannon panics about a looming family move as her daughters tune up for a rock show. Meanwhile, Vicki celebrates Briana's birthday; and family and friends watch the Beador girls perform, but an uninvited guest's startling allegation rocks the evening.
182	13	"Bye, Bye Beadors"	September 26, 2016	1.44
Michael and Kelly discuss their relationship since separating; Meghan goes to her first ultrasound appointment; Shannon packs up her house; Tamra treats Kelly, Vicki and Heather to a day of pampering at the spa; Kelly opens up about her marriage.
183	14	"Secrets, Lies and Vicki's New Guy"	October 3, 2016	1.71
Meghan celebrates the opening of her candle store with a party. Also, Vicki threatens to spill a secret about Shannon; Meghan deals with the highs and lows of pregnancy; Heather hosts a fancy book-release bash; and Meghan proposes a trip to Ireland.
184	15	"Shamrocks and Shockwaves"	October 10, 2016	1.84
In order to explore Meghan's heritage the women travel to Ireland, where on a pub crawl an exchange of words occurs between Tamra and Kelly. In order to try to salvage their first day in Ireland the women enjoy a traditional Irish Hooley Night.
185	16	"Bringing Up Old Ghosts"	October 17, 2016	1.82
After a bumpy start to the Ireland trip, Meghan invites Kelly to visit Greystones Village in an attempt to locate distant relatives. Meanwhile Vicki, Tamra, Heather, and Shannon travel to a milk farm to help out with attending to Ireland's award-winning cows.
186	17	"Puppet Strings and Tamra's Wings"	October 24, 2016	1.87
The Ireland trip concludes with a bus ride from hell. Back in Orange County, the women try to make sense of the trip while after months of diet and exercise, Tamra is finally ready to compete at her long-awaited fitness competition.
187	18	"Vicious Lies and Broken Ties"	October 31, 2016	1.81
The women gather at Shannon's new house to celebrate Tamra's victory at the fitness competition with a carb-loaded catering spread. Tamra, Heather and Shannon decide to confront Vicki about her vicious gossiping.
188	19	"Reunion Part 1"	November 7, 2016	1.85
The women come together to grill Vicki on her outsider status; Tamra discusses her award-winning derriere; Meghan opens up about her baby blues and her relationship with Jimmy; Kelly stands her ground as accusations start to fly.
189	20	"Reunion Part 2"	November 14, 2016	1.96
Kelly reveals shocking secrets about her past; Heather goes head-to-head with Kelly; Shannon talks about her rocky relationship with her mother-in-law; Vicki's daughter, Briana, dishes about her mother's relationship with the truth.
190	21	"Reunion Part 3"	November 21, 2016	1.71
In the final part of the reunion, the women discuss the terrifying Glamis accident; Meghan is questioned about her lack of sympathy towards Vicki; Shannon is overwhelmed when the women recall the unsavoury events which transpired in Ireland.
