= The Real Housewives of Orange County season 10 =

Tenth season of The Real Housewives of Orange County

The Real Housewives of Orange County
- Season 10
- Cover used by iTunes (Left to right) Edmonds, Judge, Dubrow, Gunvalson, and Beador
- Starring: Vicki Gunvalson; Tamra Judge; Heather Dubrow; Shannon Storms Beador; Meghan King Edmonds
- No. of episodes: 24

Release
- Original network: Bravo
- Original release: June 8 – November 12, 2015

Season chronology
- ← Previous; Season 9 Next → Season 11

The tenth season of The Real Housewives of Orange County, an American reality television series, was broadcast on Bravo. It aired June 8, 2015 until November 12, 2015, and was primarily filmed in Orange County, California. Its executive producers are Adam Karpel, Alex Baskin, Douglas Ross, Gregory Stewart, Scott Dunlop, Stephanie Boyriven and Andy Cohen.

The Real Housewives of Orange County focuses on the lives of Vicki Gunvalson, Tamra Judge, Heather Dubrow, Shannon Beador and Meghan King Edmonds. It consisted of 24 episodes.

== Production and crew ==
The renewal of the tenth season of The Real Housewives of Orange County was announced in January 2015. In May 2015, the official premier date, cast and trailer were revealed. The season premiere "Under Construction" was aired on June 8, 2015, while the nineteenth episode "Baptism by Fire" served as the season finale, and was aired on October 12, 2015. It was followed by a three-part reunion that aired on October 19, October 26 and November 1, 2015, a "Brooks Tell All" special hosted by Andy Cohen and a "Secrets Revealed" episode, which both aired on November 12, 2015, marking the conclusion of the season. Adam Karpel, Alex Baskin, Douglas Ross, Gregory Stewart, Scott Dunlop, Stephanie Boyriven and Andy Cohen are recognized as the series' executive producers; it is produced and distributed by Evolution Media.

== Cast and synopsis ==
All five wives featured on the ninth season returned for season ten, however Lizzie Rovsek returned in a recurring role and not full-time. Season nine's recurring cast member, Danielle Gregorio, departed the series and did not return for season ten. Joining the series in the tenth season is Meghan King Edmonds, the third wife of baseball superstar Jim Edmonds. Edmonds is described as "sexy and opinionated" as well as a "blonde bombshell."

Shannon Beador deals with the revelation of her husband David's affair and the two go to counselling and work on their relationship with each other and their children. Beador also works to repair her broken relationships with Heather Dubrow and Tamra Judge. Beador find herself in drama with newcomer Edmonds over an unwanted phone call. Dubrow continues to take control of the new house being built also releasing a sparkling wine named after her daughter, Colette. Dubrow feels disconnected and unappreciated by her husband Terry. Judge and her husband Eddie decide to spend time away from working together to improve their relationship. Judge contributes financially to her son's move to Orange County upon learning of his wife's pregnancy however knowing Eddie would not approve she does so secretly. Sarah gives birth during the season making Judge a grandmother. Judge forms a new connection with her faith and later gets baptized. Edmonds helps raise her step-daughter because her husband's former wife, LeAnn Edmonds Horton, is ill with cancer. Edmonds struggles with the idea of being too much of a parent or not enough and ending up as the friend. After filming while the season was airing, Horton lost her battle to cancer. Vicki Gunvalson and her boyfriend Brooks Ayers deal with his supposed diagnosis of cancer after he moves in with her. At Beador's house for a game night, Gunvalson receives news about the passing of her Mother and the wives gather around her to support her, including guest and former wife Jeana Keough. Gunvalson heads to Chicago to mourn with her family.

Throughout the season Ayers' cancer diagnosis and the integrity of it played a huge part. It all began when Judge arranged a lunch with her psychic who informs Judge, Dubrow and Edmonds that he doesn't believe Ayers is ill. Throughout the season accusations and speculations fly around Orange County causing all the women to be involved as well as Gunvalson's daughter Briana. Judge is forced to choose a side when her loyalty to Gunvalson is questioned, however Judge refuses to be made to look like a fool. The credibilities of Dubrow and her husband are put on the line when they are brought in to Ayers' alibi. Beador and Gunvalson's friendship breaks down when Beador's loyalty is questioned by Gunvalson even after Beador has supported the couple with Ayers' diagnosis. Beador remains loyal until Gunvalson is caught speaking of Beador's marriage and the affair. Edmonds constantly questions what she believes is a lie. Edmonds has knowledge in the situation due to her husband's former wife is currently dying of cancer. Edmonds also endeavors to uncover the truth through research of clinics, phone calls and even contacting Ayers' ex-partners. Gunvalson publicly dresses down Edmonds when she learns of her actions; however, Edmonds is undeterred and continues investigating. Things come to a head in the final episode of the season, in which the ladies confront Gunvalson at Judge's baptism, and Gunvalson infamously compares the ladies' quest for the truth regarding Ayers to Jesus Christ's crucifixion. At the reunion concluding the series, Gunvalson reveals she doesn't believe Ayers has cancer and that she was lied to. Also during the reunion, Edmonds reveals that her husband's ex-wife, who was dying of cancer during the filming of the season, had since died. During the "Brooks Tells All" special hosted by Cohen, Ayers reveals he and Gunvalson are no longer together.

== Episodes ==
The Real Housewives of Orange County season 10 episodes
No. overall	No. in season	Title	Original release date	U.S. viewers (millions)
146	1	"Under Construction"	June 8, 2015	1.74
Vicki starts living with her boyfriend Brooks. Shannon and David try to rebuild their marriage while Heather works on building her dream house. Show introduces the newest addition to the cast, Meghan King.
147	2	"Take a Swing"	June 15, 2015	1.40
Shannon and David are pushed to new limits on the last day of their couples retreat.
148	3	"Whine Country"	June 22, 2015	1.66
Heather and the others travel to Napa Valley to celebrate the launch of her new sparkling wine.
149	4	"Charity Case"	June 29, 2015	1.62
Vicki and Brooks consider unconventional cancer treatments; Meghan plans her first charity event.
150	5	"Game Changer"	July 6, 2015	1.99
Vicki gets a phone call that forever changes her life. Shannon offers an olive branch to Meghan when she hosts a Bunco party at her house. Meanwhile, Meghan moves into another house and Heather has an unorthodox date night with Terry that gets a little bloody.
151	6	"Full Circle"	July 13, 2015	1.75
Vicki's mother's passing has sent shock waves throughout the OC, causing the women all to take a deeper look at their family lives. While Vicki travels to Chicago to mourn, Tamra heads north to celebrate the birth of her granddaughter. Meanwhile, Shannon continues to heal her marriage with David. Meghan tries to create a lasting memory for her stepdaughter Hayley.
152	7	"Bowling in Heels"	July 20, 2015	1.56
Vicki enlists a medium to communicate with her late mother; Shannon contends with weighty emotions while striving to shed pounds; Meghan learns a lesson about parenting while trying to teach her stepdaughter responsibility; the women go bowling.
153	8	"Judgy Eyes & Tahitian Skies"	July 27, 2015	1.44
When Meghan hosts a couples' game night, her husband's absence becomes fair game as a topic of discussion; Shannon and David meet with their therapist; the women head off for a tropical getaway to French Polynesia.
154	9	"Swimming With Sharks"	August 3, 2015	1.72
The ladies swim with sharks during a Tahitian getaway, but Meghan discovers that the sharpest bite comes from the O.C. wives. Then, the women split up for dinner, giving Shannon, Vicki and Tamra high time to visit the bar for shots and gossip.
155	10	"Girl Code"	August 10, 2015	1.86
Hung-over from a night of drinking, Vicki and Shannon deepen their friendship by discussing the details of David's affair. Meanwhile, the other ladies head out on an excursion that puts them in deep water. Later Tamra, wanting to get everything out in the open, sparks a controversy over girl code and pot stirring. Meghan surprises the ladies at the final dinner.
156	11	"A Psychic Surprise"	August 17, 2015	2.03
A psychic reveals to Tamra, Heather, and Meghan that he "doesn't see" Brooks having cancer. The girls later tell Shannon privately this news, and things go awry when Shannon reveals this news to Vicki during dinner.
157	12	"Racing To The Truth"	August 24, 2015	1.80
Some of the housewives go together to NASCAR while Vicki celebrates her birthday with Brooks.
158	13	"Sex, Lies and Leeches"	August 31, 2015	1.97
Upset with Meghan's queries about Brooks' cancer treatment, Vicki storms off and brings Heather's luncheon to an end; Shannon visits Dr. Moon to deal with pent-up resentment; Tamra hosts a sex party, where Vicki confronts Meghan face to face.
159	14	"A Storm Is Coming"	September 7, 2015	1.88
Vicki's attack on Meghan leaves the women in disbelief; Shannon's children cook up a plan to improve their parents' relationship; Tamra admits to Eddie she's been giving financial assistance to her son; Vicki pays a visit to Briana in Oklahoma.
160	15	"Fire Signs"	September 14, 2015	1.99
When Shannon throws an Aries themed party, Brooks finally gets his chance to confront Meghan face-to-face for her relentless digging into his past. And an off-handed comment by Brooks throws Tamra into a rage.
161	16	"Suspicious Minds"	September 21, 2015	1.85
Shannon’s Aries party continues with Vicki and Brooks making an early exit leaving the other ladies questioning Brooks’ behavior and Vicki’s involvement. Heather and Terry disagree over a design for the new house, while Tamra shows her son Ryan his new home in the OC. Meanwhile, Shannon begins to question her friendship with Vicki.
162	17	"Broken Records"	September 28, 2015	1.83
As Shannon seeks to make sense of her friendships, Tamra looks to a higher source to improve her son's troubled relationship. Meanwhile, Heather's Evine launch in Minnesota takes a turn for the worse as Terry botches the rehearsal. After a trip to the doctor with Brooks, Vicki tries to put an end to the cancer debate, but when Meghan hosts a viewing party in celebration of Heather's big night, a new revelation about Brooks has everyone stunned.
163	18	"Satan Loves Confusion"	October 5, 2015	1.73
Vicki's daughter Briana visits the OC and meets Tamra for lunch with some shocking new information about Brooks. Shannon's rekindled relationship with Heather and Tamra allows her to confide in the ladies in a way she never thought possible. The ladies prep for Tamra's baptism in some unconventional ways.
164	19	"Baptism by Fire"	October 12, 2015	2.06
In the season finale, the ladies gather together to witness Tamra's baptism, but with the constant questions and confusion surrounding Brooks' cancer, Vicki is the one who feels crucified. And after an evening of avoidance, Shannon and Vicki come face-to-face when Shannon discovers that Vicki has committed the ultimate betrayal.
165	20	"Reunion Part One"	October 19, 2015	2.04
The reunion kicks off with the Housewives gathering on the couch to rehash the past year. Meghan makes her mark on her first reunion by clashing with Vicki over her step-mom comments and demonstrating what "Judgey Eyes" really looks like. Tamra reveals the heartbreaking family drama she has been keeping secret for the past year. Plus, a Housewife from the past speaks her mind about Tamra's religious transformation and Vicki shares hilarious memories of her late mother.
166	21	"Reunion Part Two"	October 26, 2015	2.35
On part two of the reunion, the ladies get wild and crazy looking back at the best OMG moments of season 10. While Shannon faces scrutiny about her marriage and David's affair, tensions rise when Heather gets heated about Vicki's betrayal of Tamra. Jim Edmonds also joins the ladies on the couch and is put in the hot seat about his marriage to Meghan. Briana makes an appearance and is no holds barred when it comes to her opinions about Brooks.
167	22	"Reunion Part Three"	November 1, 2015	1.86
The reunion concludes as the women and Briana confront Vicki head on with their doubts about Brooks' cancer. Shannon provides shocking details regarding the validity of the PET/CT Scan, Tamra and Heather confront Vicki about the possibility of being blackmailed, and all of the ladies have strong reactions to Andy's taped interview with Brooks. Then, Vicki makes a stunning revelation that has everyone doubting what they've heard.
168	23	"Brooks Tells All"	November 12, 2015	1.17
The half-hour special delves deep and showcases never-before-seen footage from Andy's sit down interview with Brooks Ayers, originally seen in the reunion, where Brooks addresses the ladies' allegations regarding his health. Andy confronts Brooks on the season's burning questions including why he avoided seeing Shannon's doctor, why he and Vicki told different stories about his treatment, and the claim that announcing his cancer diagnosis may have been an attempt to control his damaged public image. Brooks also reveals his true feelings about each of the ladies, including Vicki's daughter Briana, and explains why he finally ended his relationship with OC matriarch Vicki.
169	24	"Secrets Revealed"	November 12, 2015	1.08
The Orange County vault is opened with never-before-seen footage from season ten including Shannon's unique ladies lunch, Vicki's night out and Heather's teachable moment to Meghan about the finer points of Botox. In Tahiti, the women experience a wild ride, and back in Orange County, Heather proves the devil is in the details when building a mega home. Plus, secrets are revealed with more reunion footage addressing Vicki's scandalous history with Brooks.
