= The Real Housewives of Orange County season 17 =

The Real Housewives of Orange County
- Season 17
- Promotional poster via Peacock
- Starring: Tamra Judge; Heather Dubrow; Shannon Storms Beador; Gina Kirschenheiter; Emily Simpson; Jennifer Pedranti
- No. of episodes: 18

Release
- Original network: Bravo
- Original release: June 7 – October 11, 2023

Season chronology
- ← Previous; Season 16 Next → Season 18

The seventeenth season of the American reality television series, The Real Housewives of Orange County, premiered on June 7, 2023, on Bravo and concluded on October 11, 2023. It was primarily filmed in Orange County, California. Its executive producers are Douglas Ross, Alex Baskin, Thomas Kelly, Brian McCarthy, Apryl Richards, Scott Dunlop and Andy Cohen.

The Real Housewives of Orange County focuses on the lives of Tamra Judge, Heather Dubrow, Shannon Storms Beador, Gina Kirschenheiter, Emily Simpson and Jennifer Pedranti, with Taylor Armstrong appearing as a friend of the housewives.

== Production and crew ==
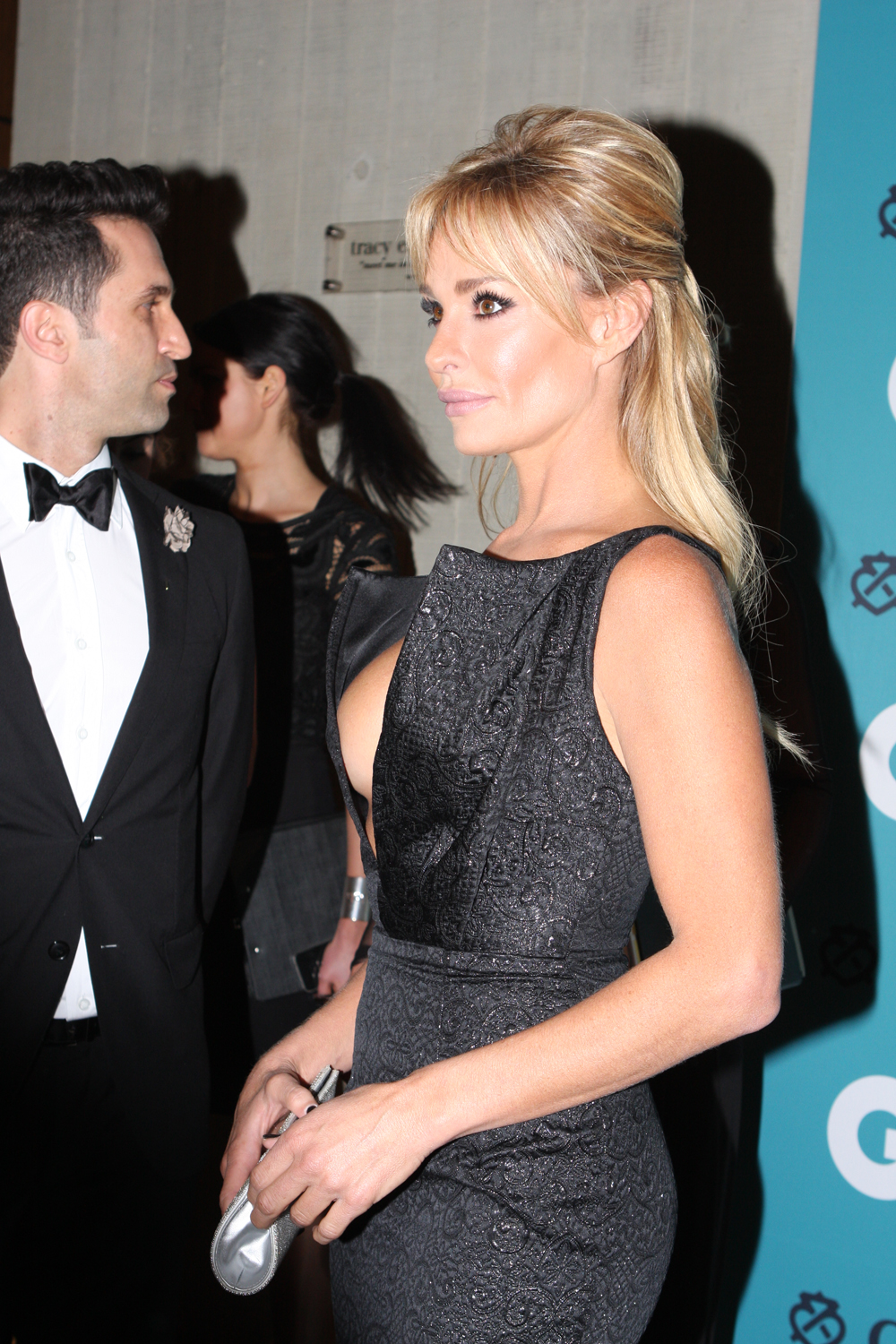
Taylor Armstrong appears in a recurring capacity

In April 2023, it was announced the season would premiere on June 7, 2023. New housewife, Jennifer Pedranti, joined the show with Tamra Judge returning after a two-season pause. Taylor Armstrong, formally of the Beverly Hills installation, appeared on the series as a "Friend of the Housewives" throughout the season. Former Housewife Vicki Gunvalson made several guest appearances throughout the season, as well as former Housewife of Beverly Hills, Teddi Mellencamp.

== Episodes ==
The Real Housewives of Orange County season 17 episodes
No. overall	No. in season	Title	Original release date	U.S. viewers (millions)
291	1	"Here Comes The Judge"	June 7, 2023	1.03
292	2	"Friendship Overboard"	June 14, 2023	0.79
293	3	"We Cut It Close(ed)"	June 21, 2023	0.76
294	4	"You Can't DB Serious"	June 28, 2023	0.78
295	5	"Campfire Confessions"	July 5, 2023	0.72
296	6	"Big Trouble in Big Sky"	July 12, 2023	0.78
297	7	"Oh Nobu You Didn't"	July 19, 2023	0.67
298	8	"Backyard Bikini Clash"	July 26, 2023	0.77
299	9	"Loose Lips and Relationships"	August 2, 2023	0.81
300	10	"A Doppelgänger Disaster"	August 9, 2023	0.73
301	11	"It's My Fiesta and I'll Cry If I Want To"	August 23, 2023	0.74
302	12	"Pumpkins & Paparazzi"	August 30, 2023	0.72
303	13	"Big News, Bigger Secret"	September 6, 2023	0.68
304	14	"Viva La Tres Amigas"	September 13, 2023	0.80
305	15	"The Tipping Point"	September 20, 2023	0.82
306	16	"Welcome to the Freak Show"	September 27, 2023	0.78
307	17	"Reunion Part 1"	October 4, 2023	0.83
308	18	"Reunion Part 2"	October 11, 2023	0.82
