= The Real Housewives of Orange County season 6 =

The Real Housewives of Orange County
- Season 6
- Cover used by iTunes (Left to right) Rossi, Barney, Gunvalson, Bellino, and Tanous
- Starring: Vicki Gunvalson; Tamra Barney; Gretchen Rossi; Alexis Bellino; Peggy Tanous
- No. of episodes: 16

Release
- Original network: Bravo
- Original release: March 6 – June 20, 2011

Season chronology
- ← Previous; Season 5 Next → Season 7

The sixth season of The Real Housewives of Orange County, an American reality television series, was broadcast on Bravo. It aired from March 6, 2011 until June 20, 2011, and was primarily filmed in Orange County, California. Its executive producers are Adam Karpel, Alex Baskin, Douglas Ross, Gregory Stewart, Scott Dunlop, Stephanie Boyriven and Andy Cohen.

The Real Housewives of Orange County focuses on the lives of Vicki Gunvalson, Tamra Barney, Gretchen Rossi, Alexis Bellino, and Peggy Tanous. It consisted of 16 episodes.

This season marked the only regular appearance of Peggy Tanous.

== Production and crew ==
In January 2011, it was revealed that The Real Housewives of Orange County would return for a sixth season and was slated to air in March later that year. The season premiere "Amped Blondes and Evil Eyes" was aired on March 6, 2011, while the fifteenth episode "Girl Fight" served as the season finale, and was aired on June 5, 2011. It was followed by a two-part reunion that aired on June 12 and June 13, 2011 and a "Lost Footage" special on June 20, 2011, which marked the conclusion of the season. Adam Karpel, Alex Baskin, Douglas Ross, Gregory Stewart, Scott Dunlop, Stephanie Boyriven and Andy Cohen are recognized as the series' executive producers; it is produced and distributed by Evolution Media.

== Cast and synopsis ==
Four of the six housewives featured on the fifth season of The Real Housewives of Orange County returned for the sixth instalment. Despite Jeana Keough's mid-season departure in the fifth season, Keough returned to season six in a recurring capacity. The season also saw Lynne Curtin departing the series but continued to make guest appearances throughout the series. During an episode of Watch What Happens Live!, Curtin has since revealed she is open to a return to the series as a full-time cast member saying, "I would love to come back." During that same episode, former wives Keough and Lauri Peterson revealed they weren't open to a return as a full-time cast member. Keough's departure as a full-time cast member left Gunvalson as the last remaining original cast member on the franchise, a title which she held until her demotion to friend of in season 14. Two new women were introduced to the series in season six, Peggy Tanous as a full-time cast member and who is described as a "stay-at-home mom with poster girl good looks", and Fernanda Rocha in a recurring capacity, a friend to Tamra Barney who is described as a "hot Brazilian lesbian fitness instructor."

Barney files for divorce from Simon and celebrates her new life with her younger boyfriend Eddie Judge. She is stressed by her worsening problems with Rossi and another feud with Keough. Barney's feud with Keough escalates, despite attempts of reconciliation, to the point of a physical altercation involving a restraining order and wine being thrown. Alexis Bellino expresses her eagerness for independence from Jim, Bellino launches a fashion collection of dresses as well as changing the rules in her marriage. Bellino finds herself competing with long-time friend and new housewife Tanous through the season and causes a divide between the two. Vicki Gunvalson continues to thrive in the workplace however her many years of balancing her professional and personal life seems to no prevail due to her relationship with Donn becoming increasingly distant and unsalvageable. Gunvalson looks to leaving the neighborhood and want to sell the house, Donn is happy to stay put. Gunvalson suffers some health issues that leaves some of the ladies questioning her. By the end of the season, it is revealed that Gunvalson and Donn are getting a divorce. Gretchen Rossi hopes for marriage become clouded by speculation that her boyfriend Smiley is a deadbeat parent and knowledge of his previous relationships with housewives. Gretchen encourages the men in her life to be healthier, they include Smiley and their two dogs. Rossi expands her business with a handbag line. Tanous explores the possibility of revitalizing her modelling career. She also reveals her struggle of Postpartum depression and her suicidal thoughts.

== Episodes ==
The Real Housewives of Orange County season 6 episodes
| No. overall | No. in season | Title | Original release date | U.S. viewers (millions) |
|---|---|---|---|---|
| 63 | 1 | "Amped Blondes and Evil Eyes" | March 6, 2011 | 2.05 |
| 64 | 2 | "Shameless in Seattle" | March 13, 2011 | 2.05 |
| 65 | 3 | "A New Lease on Life" | March 20, 2011 | 1.77 |
| 66 | 4 | "Body Shots" | March 27, 2011 | 1.79 |
| 67 | 5 | "No Hate" | April 3, 2011 | 1.51 |
| 68 | 6 | "What a Difference a Year Makes" | April 10, 2011 | 1.53 |
| 69 | 7 | "Riches to Rags" | April 17, 2011 | 1.64 |
| 70 | 8 | "Kiss and Tell" | April 24, 2011 | 1.68 |
| 71 | 9 | "Whine Pairings" | May 1, 2011 | 2.03 |
| 72 | 10 | "It's Not a Competition" | May 8, 2011 | 1.92 |
| 73 | 11 | "Cutting Loose" | May 15, 2011 | 1.70 |
| 74 | 12 | "Fashion Victim" | May 22, 2011 | 2.10 |
| 75 | 13 | "Girl Fight" | June 5, 2011 | 2.87 |
| 76 | 14 | "Reunion: Part 1" | June 12, 2011 | 2.32 |
| 77 | 15 | "Reunion: Part 2" | June 13, 2011 | 2.53 |
| 78 | 16 | "Lost Footage Special" | June 20, 2011 | 1.53 |
