= The Real Housewives of Orange County season 16 =

The Real Housewives of Orange County
- Season 16
- Cover used by the iTunes Store; From left to right: Armstrong, Simpson, Beador, Dubrow, Kirschenheiter, and Bergener.
- Starring: Heather Dubrow; Shannon Storms Beador; Gina Kirschenheiter; Emily Simpson; Jen Armstrong; Noella Bergener
- No. of episodes: 19

Release
- Original network: Bravo
- Original release: December 1, 2021 – April 27, 2022

Season chronology
- ← Previous; Season 15 Next → Season 17

The sixteenth season of the American reality television series, The Real Housewives of Orange County, premiered on December 1, 2021, on Bravo and concluded on April 27, 2022. It is primarily filmed in Orange County, California. Its executive producers are Douglas Ross, Alex Baskin, Thomas Kelly, Brian McCarthy, Apryl Richards, Scott Dunlop and Andy Cohen.

The Real Housewives of Orange County focuses on the lives of Heather Dubrow, Shannon Storms Beador, Gina Kirschenheiter, Emily Simpson, Jen Armstrong and Noella Bergener, with Nicole James appearing as a Friend of the Housewives.

This season marked the only appearances of Jen Armstrong and Noella Bergener.

== Production and crew ==
Douglas Ross, Alex Baskin, Thomas Kelly, Brian McCarthy, Apryl Richards, Scott Dunlop and Andy Cohen are recognized as the series' executive producers; it is produced and distributed by Evolution Media.

In June 2021, it was announced Kelly Dodd Leventhal, Brauwyn Windham-Burke, and Elizabeth Lyn Vargas had departed the series, with Shannon Storms Beador, Gina Kirschenheiter, Emily Simpson and Heather Dubrow returning. Production began in July 2021 and concluded in October 2021. In November 2021, the season was announced with December 1, 2021 being confirmed as the premiere date. It was also confirmed that Jen Armstrong and Noella Bergener would be the new housewives joining the cast. Nicole James appeared on the series as a "friend of the housewives", while also departing halfway through the season. Former housewives, Lizzie Rovsek and Jeana Keough made guest appearances during the season.

In July 2022, Bergener and Armstrong both confirmed their exits from the franchise on social media after one season.

== Episodes ==
The Real Housewives of Orange County season 16 episodes
No. overall	No. in season	Title	Original release date	U.S. viewers (millions)
272	1	"Fancy Pants Is Back"	December 1, 2021	1.07
Heather Dubrow is back after a five-year absence. Gina and Emily pay Dr. Jen Armstrong a visit for some OC self-care. Heather meets Noella, a girl with a carefree attitude that would make anyone blush. When Shannon confesses a truth about her old friend Nicole, Gina and Emily find themselves in an awkward situation. Gina worries if her vow to Shannon is worth more than her ethics after an awkward lunch. Heather invites the ladies to an elaborate sushi party at her house where things go fishy.
273	2	"Loose Lips and Lawsuits"	December 8, 2021	1.05
Gina and Emily look into a juicy rumor about Shannon and Heather's old friend, Nicole, at Heather's expensive sushi party. While Shannon tries to put an end to the rumor, Gina feels obligated to tell the truth, resulting in a series of explosive conflicts that puts Heather's celebration on hold. Shannon and Noella bond as the dust settles, while Heather and her husband Terry are unsure of Shannon's motives. Dr. Jen and her husband Ryne discuss their family dynamics, while Emily and Shane address the impact of faith in their familial relationship.
274	3	"Gone Guy"	December 15, 2021	1.03
After Heather's party, Shannon apologizes to the ladies, although some are more receptive than others. In the meantime, Noella's husband surprises her with some shocking news. Dr. Jen concentrates on her relationship with her mother as Gina fights to go forward with her relationship with Shannon. As her daughter prepares to be baptized in the LDS Church, Emily rekindles her faith.
275	4	"Judge & Jury"	December 22, 2021	1.04
Shane has finally passed the California bar, and the ladies have gathered to celebrate. Shannon encounters another hurdle with Emily, despite making amends with Gina. Noella's predicament intensifies as she seeks answers concerning her husband. When Heather finds out about Dr. Jen's problems with Noella, she finds herself in Noella's sights.
276	5	"A Tele-Noella"	January 5, 2022	0.98
Shannon apologizes to Heather, but it's not the end of her punishment. Meanwhile, Dr. Jen's attempt to make amends with Noella backfires spectacularly. Gina cautions Heather of other unpleasant comments Noella has made as they bond over a beautiful day at the racing track. Dr. Jen, still shaken from her altercation with Noella, questions Emily's narrative, but Emily does her best to clear the air.
277	6	"Straight Questions, Straight-ish Answers"	January 12, 2022	1.00
Jen and Emily are treated to a spa day by Heather, during which Jen discusses her marriage. Shannon travels to Nashville to see her mother and is taken aback when her daughter Sophie discloses her new relationship. Meanwhile, Heather organizes a party for her daughter Max to celebrate the publication of her book, but first tries to make amends with Noella.
278	7	"Wild Cards"	January 19, 2022	0.98
Heather arranges a private jet for the women to Cabo San Lucas. After receiving a last-minute invitation from Gina, Noella finds herself trailing behind. While Jen opens up to Heather about her challenges to find balance at home, the group has some fun in the sun. As soon as Noella comes, the temperature rises and Gina finds herself in the middle of everything.
279	8	"Sweat, Lies, and Pornography"	February 2, 2022	0.97
The ladies try to retain their cool as Cabo heats up and secrets are uncovered. Jen's chronic pain pushes her to emotional boundaries. Gina wonders if her investment in Noella is worthwhile as Heather looks at houses. Shannon's efforts to keep the peace only add fuel to the fire, setting off an explosive chain of events.
280	9	"Runaway Husband"	February 9, 2022	1.01
Tensions build on the girls' final night in Cabo. Gina begins to doubt her friendship with Noella back in the OC, while Shannon tries to develop her bonds with Heather and Emily. Emily hosts a game night, and Dr. Jen and Ryne's marriage reaches a fork in the road.
281	10	"Edible Derangements"	February 16, 2022	0.95
When Shannon invites the ladies over for lunch, Dr. Jen admits that her marriage is in trouble and seeks help from the women. When Emily challenges some details about her divorce, Emily and Noella unexpectedly clash. Heather spends quality time with her family, while Gina discovers that her startup is not well received. Shannon and Heather partake an edible.
282	11	"Wined, Dined and Ryned"	March 2, 2022	0.93
Emily prepares for Annabelle's baptism while dealing with her father's persistent relationship troubles. Heather assists Gina with cleaning out her closet and letting go of her marriage. Shannon stews over Gina's claim that she is jealous of her, while Noella gets some much-needed closure from her divorce proceedings. Heather hosts a dinner party for Dr. Jen and Ryne in the hopes of repairing their relationship, but Dr. Jen overserves herself and the evening nearly falls apart.
283	12	"Apples and Oranges"	March 9, 2022	0.94
Shannon hosts a dinner party for Emily, Noella, and Jen while Heather and Gina are in New York. While Dr. Jen focuses on improving her marriage and herself, Heather and Gina take a trip down memory lane and bond over their shared support.
284	13	"Mind Blown"	March 16, 2022	1.02
The professional lives of the women are thriving. Dr. Jen prepares to launch a new business endeavor, while Heather celebrates the conclusion of a new project with Terry, and Emily meets with an exoneree as part of The Innocence Project. Dr. Jen is at odds with Noella once again, prompting her to consider whether she should cancel an invitation to an event she is giving. When Shannon and Gina confront one other over jealousy allegations, simmering feelings finally boil over.
285	14	"The Exorcism of Gina"	March 23, 2022	0.97
Gina and Shannon's tensions are continuing to grow. Heather chooses to confront Shannon about her unresolved issues, but she is met with furious pushback. Gina summons reinforcements to help her defeat her Cabo demons, as Emily wants to celebrate her marriage with Shane. Just as the women join together to support Gina's company launch, Noella receives shocking news.
286	15	"When in Aspen..."	March 30, 2022	1.00
The ladies travel to Aspen for some much-needed rest and fresh air. When Noella and Heather arrive, they fight over the main bedroom. Shannon begins to have doubts about Emily's friendship. When all the women face off over growing tension, a calm supper is turned upside down.
287	16	"Mountain of Lies"	April 6, 2022	0.98
Noella makes strides with her divorce but struggles to control her emotions. Emily and Shannon make peace and band together to give the other ladies a scare. Noella pushes Gina to her limits, causing a chain reaction that makes Heather question her friendships.
288	17	"A Band of Housewives"	April 13, 2022	1.07
Heather is confronted by Noella over rumors she overheard during Heather's sushi party. Gina and Shannon make an attempt to save their friendship. To commemorate their marriage, Emily and Shane enjoy their fantasy wedding photo shoot. Shannon's friends band together to help her achieve her dream of becoming a rock star.
289	18	"Reunion Part 1"	April 20, 2022	1.08
The reunion begings as Shannon's past scars are reopened by a debate regarding Heather's return; Noella's divorce narrative is questioned; Emily confronts painful truths from her background; Gina and Shannon's rising resentments of one other reach a climax.
290	19	"Reunion Part 2"	April 27, 2022	1.07
The reunion concludes as Gina and Shannon's friendship is in jeopardy; Dr. Jen shares details about her marriage; Shannon considers her next chapter; and Noella debates everyone over their trip to Aspen.
