= The Real Housewives of Orange County season 1 =

Season of television series

The Real Housewives of Orange County
- Season 1
- Cover used by the iTunes Store (Left to right) Gunvalson, De La Rosa, Waring, Bryant, and Keough
- Starring: Kimberly Bryant; Jo De La Rosa; Vicki Gunvalson; Jeana Keough; Lauri Waring
- No. of episodes: 8

Release
- Original network: Bravo
- Original release: March 21 – May 9, 2006

Season chronology
- Next → Season 2

The first season of The Real Housewives of Orange County, an American reality television series, was broadcast on Bravo. It aired from March 21, 2006, until May 9, 2006, and was primarily filmed in Orange County, California. The first season was executive produced by Kevin Kaufman, Scott Dunlop, and Patrick Moses, produced through Kaufman Films and Dunlop Entertainment.Subsequent seasons were executive produced by Adam Karpel, Alex Baskin, Douglas Ross, Gregory Stewart, Scott Dunlop, Stephanie Boyriven and Andy Cohen.

The Real Housewives of Orange County focuses on the lives of Kimberly Bryant, Jo De La Rosa, Vicki Gunvalson, Jeana Keough and Lauri Waring. It consisted of eight episodes, all of which aired on Tuesday evenings.

This marked the only regular appearance of Kimberly Bryant.

== Production and crew ==
In April 2005, The Real Housewives was announced as one of six reality television series ordered by the American television channel Bravo; before its premiere, it was renamed The Real Housewives of Orange County in January 2006. One of its producers, Scott Dunlop, commented that it was originally planned to be set in a single gated community in Coto de Caza, California. A press release issued by the network noted that the series was inspired by the scripted soap operas Desperate Housewives and Peyton Place, and would document the lives of upper-class women who "lead glamorous lives in a picturesque Southern California gated community where the average home has a $1.6 million price tag and residents include CEOs and retired professional athletes."

In August 2016, Keough, now a former cast member, revealed on Oprah: Where are they Now? that it was her family that inspired the series due to the producer, Scott Dunlop, being her neighbor at the time and writing the show about Keough and her family. Keough also went on to claim the success of the show was the time was due to timing, saying "the writers’ strike was on, so we became hugely successful for lack of anything else on TV."

The series premiere "Meet the Wives" was aired on March 21, 2006, while the seventh episode "The Finale" served as the season finale, and was aired on May 2, 2006. It was followed by a reunion which marked the conclusion of the season and was broadcast on May 9, 2006. Adam Karpel, Alex Baskin, Douglas Ross, Gregory Stewart, Scott Dunlop, Stephanie Boyriven and Andy Cohen are recognized as the series' executive producers; it is produced and distributed by Evolution Media.

== Cast and synopsis ==
Five housewives were featured during the first season of The Real Housewives of Orange County, who were described as "women who are living lives of privilege and indulgence, replete with gorgeous homes, privileged offspring and fabulous bling." The first season sees Bryant discussing her family's move from Baltimore to Coto de Caza while dealing with a health scare, while De La Rosa's relationship with her fiancé Slade Smiley presents struggles. Gunvalson runs her own insurance company, for which Waring is an employee. Waring struggles financially after her divorce from her unnamed ex-husband, deals with her teenage son Josh's frequent run-ins with the law, and unexpectedly sees her young adult daughter Ashley move back in with the family after previously living in Los Angeles. With her husband Matt Keough often away traveling for work, Keough raises her children Shane, Kara, and Colton fairly independently.

== Episodes ==
The Real Housewives of Orange County season 1 episodes
No. overall	No. in season	Title	Original release date	U.S. viewers (millions)
1	1	"Meet the Wives"	March 21, 2006	0.43
Shane is nervous about high school graduation and the pressure of making it big in baseball as his father did. Kimberly discusses the option of breast implants. Jo begins to deal with her being engaged to an older, richer man.
2	2	"Is It Hunting Season, Yet?"	March 28, 2006	N/A
Shane is hired by Jo to hunt rabbits that are invading the neighborhood. Kimberly is being pressured into upgrading her car and Vicki gets pretty wild on a cruise.
3	3	"Upgrading Has Nothing to do With You Honey"	April 4, 2006	N/A
Shane is in Arizona visiting a college. Kara passes the time by spending money and Vicki and Lauri get Botox treatments.
4	4	"Talk, Talk, Talk"	April 11, 2006	N/A
Kimberly and Scott go house hunting with Jeana. Shane takes a liking to Jo. Lauri has problems with her 16-year-old son. Vicki and her husband have an argument over Briana.
5	5	"Cut the P and Lem out of Problem and you get ROB"	April 18, 2006	N/A
Jo is having problems taking care of the house. Josh gets out of juvenile hall. Vicki's husband is working on a house flip. Colton breaks his hand.
6	6	"Shocking News"	April 25, 2006	N/A
Slade's parents come visiting. Vicki attends her high school reunion and Kimberly is awaiting news from her doctor.
7	7	"The Finale"	May 2, 2006	N/A
Jo and Slade continue to have problems. Shane prepares to leave for college.
8	8	"Reunion"	May 9, 2006	N/A
The five women reunite to tell their stories and reflect on the show.
