= A New Lease on Life =

A New Lease on Life may refer to:

- "A New Lease on Life" (The Real Housewives of Orange County)
- "A New Lease on Life" (Will & Grace)

== See also ==
- New Lease on Life, an album by William Bell
- Lease of Life, a 1954 film
