= Alexis Bellino =

American television personality

- Born: Alexis Dietrich; January 19, 1977 (age 49); Hannibal, Missouri, U.S.
- Education: University of Missouri (BSBA)
- Occupation: Television personality
- Known for: The Real Housewives of Orange County
- Spouse(s): Jeff Barry (m. 2002; div. 2004) Jim Bellino (m. 2005; div. 2018) John Janssen (m. 2025)
- Children: 3

Alexis Janssen (née Dietrich; formerly Bellino; born January 19, 1977) is an American television personality, best known as a cast member of The Real Housewives of Orange County for seasons 5-8 as a full-time cast member and season 18 as a friend of the housewives.

== Education ==
Bellino graduated from Hannibal High School in 1995, and earned a bachelor of science in business administration degree with an emphasis in marketing from the University of Missouri.

== Career ==
Bellino was a main cast member of The Real Housewives of Orange County from seasons 5 to 8, and returned in a "friend of" capacity for season 18. She has also been a "live celebrity correspondent" for a television station in San Diego.

== Personal life ==
Bellino was married to Jeff Barry from 2002 to 2004. In 2018, she finalized her divorce from Jim Bellino after 13 years of marriage; the couple had three children. She was then engaged to Andy Bohn. On August 27, 2024, Bellino got engaged to John Janssen after meeting in November 2023. On October 3, 2025, Bellino married John Janssen in Laguna Beach.

She has a tattoo in memory of her mother, Penelope. As of 2023, she has two dogs, named Biscuit and Prince.

Jim Bellino sued Orange County housewives Shannon Beador and Tamra Judge for defamation in 2018 over remarks they made about his business on a podcast. Beador prevailed in the lawsuit in 2020 and Bellino settled with Judge in 2021.
