= Tamra's OC Wedding =

Television series

- Genre: Reality
- Starring: Tamra Barney; Eddie Judge
- Country of origin: United States
- Original language: English
- No. of episodes: 3

Production
- Executive producers: Alex Baskin; Chaz Gray; Douglas Ross; Gregory Stewart; Lasta Drachkovitch
- Camera setup: Multiple
- Running time: 43 minutes
- Production company: Evolution Media

Original release
- Network: Bravo
- Release: September 2 – September 16, 2013

Related
- The Real Housewives of Orange County

Tamra's OC Wedding is an American reality television series on Bravo that debuted on September 2, 2013. The three-part miniseries chronicles the weeks prior to the wedding of Tamra Barney and Eddie Judge as well as the wedding itself — which took place on June 15, 2013, at the Monarch Beach Resort in Dana Point, California.

The series is the second spin-off of The Real Housewives of Orange County, following Date My Ex: Jo & Slade.

== Cast ==
=== Main ===
- Tamra Barney, housewife on The Real Housewives of Orange County
- Eddie Judge, Tamra's fiancé

=== Supporting ===
- Heather Dubrow, close friend of Tamra's and fellow castmate on The Real Housewives of Orange County
- Vicki Gunvalson, close friend of Tamra's and fellow castmate on The Real Housewives of Orange County
- Ricky Santana, Tamra's man of honor
- Terry Dubrow, Heather's husband; close friend of Tamra and Eddie's
- Diann Valentine, Tamra's wedding planner

== Episodes ==
No.	Title	Original release date	U.S. viewers (millions)
1	"Tamra and Eddie's Wedding Kick-Off"	September 2, 2013	1.27
With the wedding five weeks away, Tamra starts planning her dream wedding while Eddie is still off working on their gym and feels that a minimalistic wedding will do. Tamra plans a co-ed weekend in Las Vegas that ends up testing the couple's trust once pictures from Eddie's bachelor party are sent to Heather's iPhone.
2	"Decisions, Decisions"	September 9, 2013	1.44
Tamra confides to Eddie that she always feels pressured to impress his family. The trip to choose bridesmaids' dresses turns bad once drama erupts. Eddie and Tamra's families get together for a barbecue.
3	"Tamra and Eddie's Big O.C. Wedding"	September 16, 2013	1.40
Tamra and Eddie host a final pre-wedding dinner with their closest friends. Later, the wedding day finally arrives.
