= The Real Housewives of Orange County =

American reality television series

- Genre: Reality television
- Created by: Scott Dunlop
- Inspired by: Desperate Housewives; Peyton Place
- Starring: Kimberly Bryant; Jo De La Rosa; Vicki Gunvalson; Jeana Keough; Lauri Peterson; Tammy Knickerbocker; Tamra Judge; Quinn Fry; Lynne Curtin; Gretchen Rossi; Alexis Bellino; Peggy Tanous; Heather Dubrow; Lydia McLaughlin; Shannon Storms Beador; Lizzie Rovsek; Meghan King Edmonds; Kelly Dodd; Peggy Sulahian; Gina Kirschenheiter; Emily Simpson; Braunwyn Windham-Burke; Elizabeth Lyn Vargas; Jen Armstrong; Noella Bergener; Jennifer Pedranti; Katie Ginella; Carmella Garcia
- Country of origin: United States
- Original language: English
- No. of seasons: 20
- No. of episodes: 367 (list of episodes)

Production
- Executive producers: Douglas Ross; Alex Baskin; Thomas Kelly; Brian McCarthy; Apryl Richards; Scott Dunlop; Andy Cohen
- Camera setup: Multi-camera
- Running time: 42 minutes
- Production companies: Evolution Media; Dunlop Entertainment; 32 Flavors

Original release
- Network: Bravo
- Release: March 21, 2006 – present

Related
- Date My Ex: Jo & Slade; Tamra's OC Wedding

The Real Housewives of Orange County, abbreviated RHOC, is an American reality television series that premiered on Bravo on March 21, 2006. It has aired twenty seasons and focuses on the personal and professional lives of several wealthy women residing in Orange County, California.

The cast of the first season consisted of Kimberly Bryant, Vicki Gunvalson, Jeana Keough, Jo De La Rosa, and Lauri Waring (later Peterson). Other housewives that starred in the subsequent eighteen seasons include Tammy Knickerbocker, Quinn Fry, Lynne Curtin, Gretchen Rossi, Alexis Bellino, Peggy Tanous, Lydia McLaughlin, Lizzie Rovsek, Meghan King Edmonds, Kelly Dodd, Peggy Sulahian, Braunwyn Windham-Burke, Elizabeth Lyn Vargas, Jen Armstrong, Noella Bergener, and Katie Ginella. The cast of the twentieth season starred Gunvalson, Tamra Judge, Heather Dubrow, Shannon Storms Beador, Gina Kirschenheiter, Emily Simpson, Jennifer Pedranti, and Carmella Garcia.

It is the founding installment of The Real Housewives franchise and its success led to the expansion of the franchise with numerous spin-off series set in cities across the United States and internationally. It has also resulted in two spin-offs; Date My Ex: Jo & Slade and Tamra's OC Wedding.

== Production ==
=== Seasons 1–8 ===
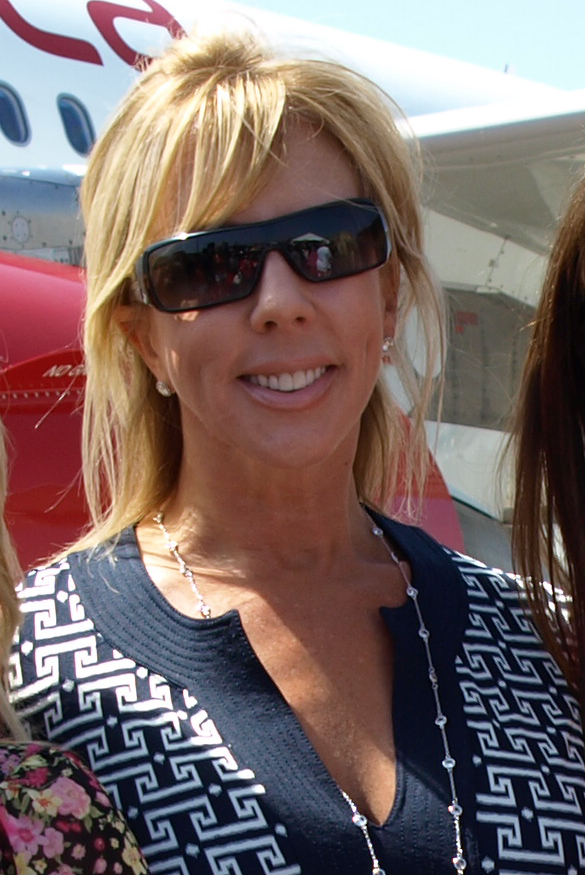
Vicki Gunvalson appeared as a main cast member during the series' first thirteen seasons, making her the first housewife of the entire franchise to achieve that milestone.

In April 2005, The Real Housewives was ordered by American television network Bravo. The show's working title was Behind the Gates, and was intended to follow a documentary format. It was renamed as The Real Housewives of Orange County in January 2006. Show creator Scott Dunlop said that it was originally planned to be set in a single gated community in Coto de Caza, California. The show was inspired by scripted soap operas Desperate Housewives and Peyton Place, and would document the lives of upper-class women who "lead glamorous lives in a Southern California gated community where the average home has a $1.6 million price tag and residents include CEOs and retired professional athletes."

The first season premiered on March 21, 2006, and starred Kimberly Bryant, Jo De La Rosa, Vicki Gunvalson, Jeana Keough and Lauri Peterson (then Waring). Bryant left after the first season. Tammy Knickerbocker joined the cast for the second season which premiered on January 16, 2007. Bryant appeared as a guest. After the second season, De La Rosa exited the series as a regular cast member. The third season premiered on November 6, 2007, which featured Tamra Judge (then Barney) as the latest housewife, while Quinn Fry joined the cast in the sixth episode. Bryant and De La Rosa returned as guests. Knickerbocker and Fry left the main cast after the third season.

Gretchen Rossi was introduced in the fourth season premiere on November 25, 2008. Peterson made her final appearance as a main cast member in the third episode, while Lynne Curtin joined the cast in the fourth episode. Bryant and De La Rosa made their final guest appearance during the season finale, whilst Knickerbocker also returned as a guest. Keough's final season as a full-time cast member, season five premiered on November 5, 2009. After Keough left the show as a full-time cast member, Alexis Bellino was added to the main cast. Fry, Knickerbocker and Peterson returned as a guest. Curtin left after the fifth season.

The sixth season which premiered on March 6, 2011, introduced Peggy Tanous as the newest housewife and friend of the housewives Fernanda Rocha. Keough returned in a "friend of the housewives" capacity, while Curtin, Fry, and Knickerbocker appeared as guests. Heather Dubrow joined the cast in the seventh season which premiered on February 7, 2012. Keough and Tanous appeared in guest capacities, with the latter receiving confessional interviews in the season's first two episodes, while Sarah Winchester was featured as a friend of the housewives. Tanous was set to film another season as a full-time housewife, however, quit the series after the season's second episode due to ongoing personal conflict involving herself, Bellino and Bellino's husband, Jim; marking her final appearance on the show. On April 1, 2013, the eighth season premiered and the cast was joined by Lydia McLaughlin. Peterson also appeared as a friend of the housewives in the eighth season. Bellino, McLaughlin, Rossi and Peterson departed after the season.

=== Seasons 9–16 ===
The ninth season premiered on April 14, 2014, and introduced Shannon Storms Beador and Lizzie Rovsek as the new housewives. While Danielle Gregorio joined as friend of the housewives. The tenth season which premiered on June 8, 2015, saw Rovsek return as a friend of the housewives, and Meghan King joining the cast. Curtin, Keough and Knickerbocker made guest appearances in the season.

The eleventh season premiered on June 20, 2016. It featured Kelly Leventhal (then Dodd) joining the cast and Keough making a guest appearance. Dubrow exited the series after the season. McLaughlin returned for the show's twelfth season which premiered on July 10, 2017. Peggy Sulahian joined as the latest housewife, while Keough, Rossi and Rovsek made guest appearances. After the season concluded, King Edmonds, McLaughlin and Sulahian left the show.

Gina Kirschenheiter and Emily Simpson joined the cast for the thirteenth season, which premiered on July 16, 2018. The fourteenth season premiered on August 6, 2019. Braunwyn Windham-Burke joined as a cast member, while Gunvalson was demoted to a "friend of the housewives" status. King and Bellino both appeared in a guest capacity. Gunvalson and Judge both left the series in January 2020. Filming for the show was paused between March and July 2020 due to the COVID-19 pandemic in the United States.

The fifteenth season premiered on October 14, 2020, with Elizabeth Lyn Vargas joining the cast. Keough served as a narrator in the opening of the season premiere. Rovsek appeared as a guest in the fifth episode. The season served as the final season for Dodd, Windham-Burke and Vargas.

The sixteenth season premiered on December 1, 2021, with Beador, Kirschenheiter and Simpson returning, along with former housewife Dubrow, and new housewives Jen Armstrong and Noella Bergener joining the main cast. Nicole James appeared as a friend of the housewives, departing halfway through the season. Keough and Rovsek also had guest appearances during the season. The reunion was taped on March 10, 2022.

=== Seasons 17–present ===
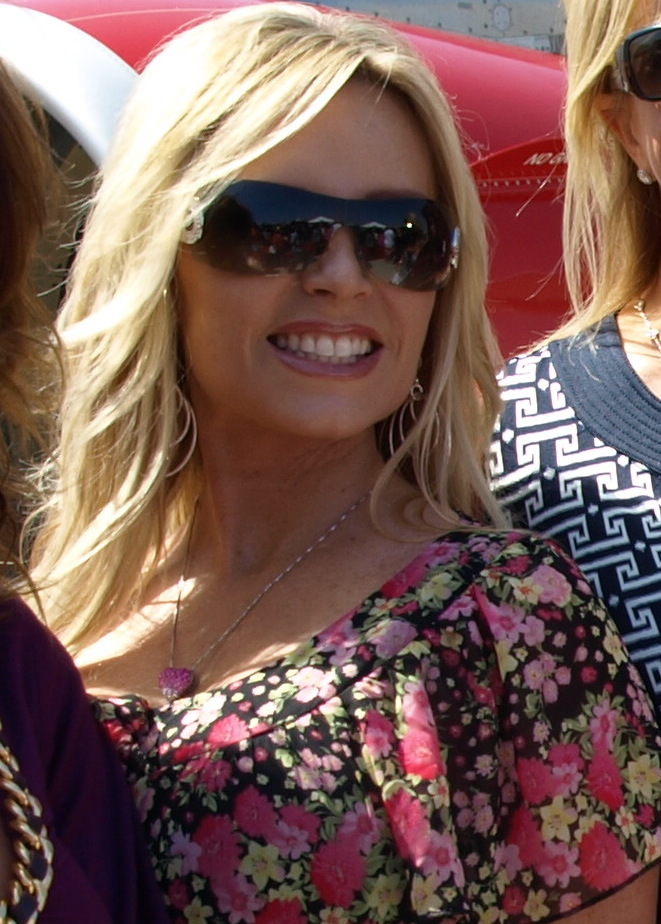
Tamra Judge, who originally appeared from season three to season fourteen, returned during the series' seventeenth season.

Following the conclusion of the sixteenth season, Armstrong and Bergener announced their exits from the show. On July 20, Judge announced her return to the franchise. The following month, it was announced former The Real Housewives of Beverly Hills cast member Taylor Armstrong joined the cast as a friend of the housewives. In October, Gunvalson was announced to appear in a guest capacity. The seventeenth season premiered on June 7, 2023, with new housewife Jennifer Pedranti joining the cast.

In late 2023, the show was renewed for an eighteenth season. Filming began in January 2024 with all cast members from the seventeenth season returning, minus Armstrong, who announced her departure in November 2023. On January 24, it was confirmed that former housewife, Alexis Bellino would be returning to the show in a friend of capacity. The eighteenth season premiered on July 11, 2024, with new housewife Katie Ginella joining the cast, as well as Bellino appearing as a "friend of the housewives". Gunvalson, Vargas and De La Rosa, as well as Teddi Mellencamp Arroyave made guest appearances throughout the season. Bellino announced her departure from the show on December 20, 2024.

In late 2024, the show was renewed for a nineteenth season. Production commenced in January 2025 with the entire main cast from the previous season returning. On January 29, 2025, it was announced Rossi would be returning for the season in a "friend of" capacity. The nineteenth season premiered on July 10, 2025. De La Rosa and Vargas made guest appearances throughout the season. On November 14, 2025, it was announced at BravoCon that Gunvalson would be returning to the series as a full-time housewife for the twentieth season, which premiered on July 9, 2026. The season saw the return of the entire regular cast from the nineteenth season, with the exception of Ginella. It also introduced a new housewife, former Playboy Playmate Carmella Garcia, and featured guest appearances by Bryant, Keough, Peterson, De La Rosa, Rovsek, and Vargas.

== Cast ==
Main cast members
Cast member	Seasons																			
Cast member	1	2	3	4	5	6	7	8	9	10	11	12	13	14	15	16	17	18	19	20
Kimberly Bryant	Main	Guest	Guest	Guest																Guest
Jo De La Rosa	Main	Main	Guest	Guest														Guest	Guest	Guest
Vicki Gunvalson	Main	Main	Main	Main	Main	Main	Main	Main	Main	Main	Main	Main	Main	Friend			Guest	Guest		Main
Jeana Keough	Main	Main	Main	Main	Main	Friend	Guest			Guest	Guest	Guest				Guest				Guest
Lauri Peterson	Main	Main	Main	Main	Guest			Friend												Guest
Tammy Knickerbocker		Main	Main	Guest	Guest	Guest				Guest										Guest
Quinn Fry			Main	Guest	Guest	Guest														Guest
Tamra Judge			Main	Main	Main	Main	Main	Main	Main	Main	Main	Main	Main	Main			Main	Main	Main	Main
Lynne Curtin				Main	Main	Guest				Guest										Guest
Gretchen Rossi				Main	Main	Main	Main	Main				Guest							Friend	Guest
Alexis Bellino					Main	Main	Main	Main						Guest				Friend		Guest
Peggy Tanous						Main	Guest													Guest
Heather Dubrow							Main	Main	Main	Main	Main					Main	Main	Main	Main	Main
Lydia McLaughlin								Main				Main								
Lizzie Rovsek									Main	Friend		Guest			Guest	Guest				Guest
Shannon Storms Beador									Main	Main	Main	Main	Main	Main	Main	Main	Main	Main	Main	Main
Meghan King Edmonds									Guest	Main	Main	Main		Guest						
Kelly Dodd											Main	Main	Main	Main	Main					
Peggy Sulahian												Main								
Gina Kirschenheiter													Main	Main	Main	Main	Main	Main	Main	Main
Emily Simpson										Guest			Main	Main	Main	Main	Main	Main	Main	Main
Braunwyn Windham-Burke														Main	Main					Guest
Elizabeth Lyn Vargas															Main			Guest	Guest	Guest
Jen Armstrong															Guest	Main				
Noella Bergener														Guest	Guest	Main				
Jennifer Pedranti																	Main	Main	Main	Main
Katie Ginella																		Main	Main	
Carmella Garcia																				Main
Friends of the housewives
Fernanda Rocha					Guest	Friend														Guest
Sarah Winchester					Guest	Guest	Friend													
Danielle Gregorio									Friend											
Nicole James																Friend				
Taylor Armstrong																	Friend			

== Episodes ==
The Real Housewives of Orange County episodes
Season	Episodes	Originally released		Average Viewers
Season	Episodes	First released	Last released	Average Viewers
1	8	March 21, 2006	May 9, 2006	—N/a
2	10	January 16, 2007	March 20, 2007	—N/a
3	12	November 6, 2007	January 29, 2008	1.50
4	15	November 25, 2008	June 11, 2009	2.17
5	17	November 5, 2009	March 11, 2010	—N/a
6	16	March 6, 2011	June 20, 2011	1.94
7	23	February 7, 2012	July 24, 2012	1.90
8	23	April 1, 2013	September 1, 2013	1.89
9	21	April 14, 2014	September 8, 2014	1.75
10	24	June 8, 2015	November 12, 2015	1.77
11	21	June 20, 2016	November 21, 2016	1.80
12	21	July 10, 2017	November 27, 2017	1.70
13	21	July 16, 2018	December 9, 2018	1.42
14	23	August 6, 2019	December 26, 2019	1.32
15	16	October 14, 2020	January 27, 2021	1.04
16	19	December 1, 2021	April 27, 2022	1.07
17	18	June 7, 2023	October 11, 2023	0.78
18	20	July 11, 2024	November 21, 2024	0.61
19	20	July 10, 2025	November 20, 2025	0.55
20	19	July 9, 2026	November 12, 2026	TBA

== Broadcast ==
The Real Housewives of Orange County airs regularly on Bravo in the United States; most episodes are approximately forty-two minutes in length, and are broadcast in standard definition and high definition. Since its premiere, the series has alternated airing on Monday, Tuesday, Wednesday, Thursday and Sunday evenings and has been frequently shifted between the 8:00, 9:00, and 10:00 pm timeslots.

== Spin-offs ==
Date My Ex: Jo & Slade became the first spin-off from The Real Housewives of Orange County; the dating game show documented De La Rosa as she began dating after moving to Los Angeles, where potential suitors were regularly surveyed by Smiley. It premiered on June 30, 2008, and ended on September 8, 2008, after broadcasting nine episodes during its first and only season.

After becoming engaged to Judge in February 2013, Barney was commissioned to star in the three-part spin-off special Tamra's OC Wedding. It highlighted the preparations for their nuptials and was broadcast from September 2, 2013, until September 16, 2013.
