= The Real Housewives of Orange County season 15 =

The Real Housewives of Orange County
- Season 15
- Cover used by the iTunes Store
- Starring: Shannon Storms Beador; Kelly Dodd-Leventhal; Gina Kirschenheiter; Emily Simpson; Braunwyn Windham-Burke; Elizabeth Lyn Vargas
- No. of episodes: 16

Release
- Original network: Bravo
- Original release: October 14, 2020 – January 27, 2021

Season chronology
- ← Previous; Season 14 Next → Season 16

The fifteenth season of the American reality television series The Real Housewives of Orange County premiered on October 14, 2020, on Bravo and concluded on January 27, 2021. It is primarily filmed in Orange County, California. Its executive producers are Adam Karpel, Alex Baskin, Douglas Ross, Gregory Stewart, Scott Dunlop, Stephanie Boyriven and Andy Cohen.

The Real Housewives of Orange County focuses on the lives of Shannon Storms Beador, Kelly Dodd-Leventhal, Gina Kirschenheiter, Emily Simpson, Braunwyn Windham-Burke and Elizabeth Lyn Vargas.

This season marked the final appearances of Kelly Dodd-Leventhal and Braunwyn Windham-Burke. It also marked the only regular appearance of Elizabeth Lyn Vargas.

== Production and crew ==
Douglas Ross, Alex Baskin, Thomas Kelly, Brian McCarthy, Megan Sanchez-Warner, Scott Dunlop and Andy Cohen are recognized as the series' executive producers; it is produced and distributed by Evolution Media.

In January 2020, Vicki Gunvalson and Tamra Judge announced their departures from the series. Judge was previously offered to return to the series for three episodes to wrap up her storylines but instead decided to depart the series. Shannon Storms Beador, Kelly Dodd-Leventhal, Gina Kirschenheiter, Emily Simpson and Braunwyn Windham-Burke returned, with Elizabeth Lyn Vargas joining as a new cast member.

Production on the series was halted in March 2020, due to the COVID-19 pandemic in the United States. While production was halted, the cast filmed themselves. Production on the series resumed in July 2020. That same month, Storms Beador announced she and her three daughters had tested positive for COVID-19, with the series remaining in production. In August of the same year, Storms Beador announced she had recovered and tested negative for the virus.

Former housewife Jeana Keough served as narrator in the opening of the first episode.

== Cast ==
Tamra Judge exited the series after 12 seasons on the show. Elizabeth Lyn Vargas filled in as Judge's replacement.

== Episodes ==
The Real Housewives of Orange County season 15 episodes
No. overall	No. in season	Title	Original release date	U.S. viewers (millions)
256	1	"An Unexpected Secret"	October 14, 2020	1.05
The fifteenth season begins with Kelly Dodd, Gina Kirschenheiter and Shannon Storms Beador each celebrating significant moments in their lives; despite this, Shannon voices her frustrations concerning Kelly. New housewife Elizabeth Lyn Vargas' unconventional relationship leaves Kelly and Braunwyn Windham-Burke shocked, and Emily Simpson celebrates her anniversary with husband, Shane Simpson.
257	2	"Tequila Truth Serum"	October 21, 2020	1.11
While focusing on her fiancé Rick Leventhal, Kelly beings to wonder about Shannon. Elizabeth and new boyfriend, Jimmy, discover shared heritage, which they bond over. Elsewhere, Braunwyn begins to struggle with her new identity, while she and the other women begin to make remarks concerning the size of Gina's home.
258	3	"The Splash Heard Round the OC"	October 28, 2020	1.00
Emily is hoping to ease the estrangement between her and Shannon, while Shannon is ready to show off her recent accomplishments. When Kelly and Gina question Elizabeth's relationship, Gina confronts Shannon and Braunwyn concerning their opinions about her home.
259	4	"The Aftershock"	November 4, 2020	1.01
As Shannon's housewarming party continues, Braunwyn attempts to reconcile her friendship with Gina.
260	5	"An Unexpected Guest"	November 11, 2020	1.09
In her attempt to reconcile with Gina, Braunwyn opens up about her alcoholism, while Gina continues with her legal case against her ex-husband. Elizabeth struggles with her relationship with her sister, while Braunwyn's son experiments with drag.
261	6	"The Vow Renewal"	November 18, 2020	1.06
Braunwyn and her husband Sean renew their vows. As the COVID-19 pandemic in California picks up, Shannon stocks up on supplies. Elsewhere, Kelly is on the receiving end of bad news.
262	7	"Renewals and Regrets"	November 25, 2020	0.98
As Braunwyn and her husband Sean renew their vows, Kelly and Shannon fail to see eye-to-eye. In a sign of solidarity with Braunwyn's sobriety, Gina decides to stop drinking and Shannon extends an olive branch.
263	8	"The Calm Before the Storm"	December 2, 2020	1.12
Shannon, Gina and Emily try to figure out Elizabeth as her stories do not add up. Braunwyn tries to deal with her sobriety. In the OC, the ladies go full on panic mode and fear as the COVID-19 pandemic starts to unravel throughout the world.
264	9	"The Lies That Bind"	December 9, 2020	1.08
As the COVID-19 pandemic shuts down the world, the OC ladies start to self-film themselves in quarantine. Tensions in Emily and Shane's marriage starts to rise. Shannon and John start to have issues in their relationship. Braunwyn starts to look in Elizabeth's past as the ladies decide to go on a quarantine trip to Lake Arrowhead.
265	10	"The Great OC Escape"	December 16, 2020	1.00
As the OC ladies are out in Lake Arrowhead but not everyone makes it. The trip soon takes a turn as conversations about Black Lives Matter seems to separate the group.
266	11	"A Submerged Secret"	December 23, 2020	1.03
Gina receives some upsetting news as Braunwyn and Elizabeth have an intense conversation. While on a walk, Elizabeth makes a revelation that shocks Braunwyn. Back at home, Shannon receives disheartening news as Emily tries to stay strong for her family.
267	12	"The Unmasking of Elizabeth Vargas"	December 30, 2020	1.02
Braunwyn and Elizabeth have a heart to heart moment as Shannon tells the ladies some shocking news. Emily picks up Shane from the hospital as Braunwyn's marriage begins to struggle.
268	13	"Trouble in Newport Beach"	January 6, 2021	0.82
Shannon begins to prepare as her oldest daughter begins packing for college as her and John try to resolve their issues. Kelly begins to question Braunwyn's character.
269	14	"Making Waves"	January 13, 2021	1.01
Emily hosts a beach party but unresolved tensions in the group threaten to ruin things. Shannon holds a grudge against Gina, leaving her speechless. The ladies confront Brauwyn about her marriage and relationship to Sean.
270	15	"Reunion Part 1"	January 20, 2021	1.08
Part One of the Reunion kicks off as Shannon defends herself from making comments about Gina's house. Andy wants answers from Kelly surrounding her comments around the COVID-19 pandemic. Emotions run high as Shannon sheds light to a situation about Braunwyn involving her daughter.
271	16	"Reunion Part 2"	January 27, 2021	1.10
Part Two of the Reunion, Braunwyn tries to deal with what happened with Shannon's daughter. The ladies begin to confront Braunwyn over her character and authenticity. Elizabeth talks about living in a cult as Sean soon joins the ladies as questions submerge about his marriage and future with Braunwyn.
