= Lydia McLaughlin =

Canadian entrepreneur

- Born: Lydia Stirling; March 10, 1981 (age 45); St. John's, Newfoundland and Labrador, Canada
- Education: University of San Diego
- Occupation: Entrepreneur • author • television personality
- Years active: 2003–present
- Television: The Real Housewives of Orange County
- Spouse: Doug McLaughlin (m. 2006)
- Children: 3
- Relatives: Geoff Stirling (grandfather)
- Website: oclydia.com

Lydia McLaughlin (née Stirling; born March 10, 1981) is a magazine editor, author, television personality, writer, and entrepreneur based in Orange County, California. McLaughlin is best known for appearing on the Bravo reality show The Real Housewives of Orange County, starring in seasons 8 and 12. In 2016, she co-founded the lifestyle magazine, Nobleman, with her husband, Doug.

She is the granddaughter of Canadian businessman Geoff Stirling, founder of Stirling Communications International.

== Early life ==
Lydia McLaughlin was born on March 10, 1981, in St. John's, Newfoundland and Labrador, Canada, to father Scott Stirling, and mother Judith "Judy" Stirling (née Young; 1948–2024), former Playboy Playmate of the Month (May 1970). She has two brothers, Geoff Jr. (1979–2025) and Jesse. She and her family practice catholicism. Her family owns Stirling Communications International which oversees the CJON-DT television network in St. John's, Newfoundland and Labrador.

McLaughlin relocated to Mission Beach, San Diego, when she attended University of San Diego, where she was the Chapman of the Alpha Phi sorority before graduating in 2003.

== Career ==
Upon marrying her husband in 2003, Lydia, her husband Doug, and brother-in-law Marshall founded the Skylab Modern Art gallery in Laguna Beach, as well as its accompanying media group.

In 2009, Lydia and Doug co-founded their luxury lifestyle magazine, Beverly Hills Lifestyle, where she served as the magazines managing editor. In 2015, Lydia and Doug announced their forthcoming magazine, Nobleman, which launched in September 2016. Also in 2016, Beverly Hills Lifestyle was sold to restaurateur Lisa Vanderpump, who was previously a contributor of the magazine. Distributed nationally, it is headquartered in Newport Beach, California. Similar to Beverly Hills Lifestyle, Nobleman features editorial pieces on celebrities, design, film, travel, eat and drink, vip events, and real estate.

In April 2013, McLaughlin was announced as the newest addition to The Real Housewives of Orange County and would be joining for the eighth season. In November, McLaughlin announced her departure from the show, stating, "I want to build my brand outside of the Housewives -- I've always been really honest with the producers about that. I knew that while I was filming it that I probably wasn't going to be doing it again." In 2017, McLaughlin announced she would be returning to the series for its twelfth season. On February 9, 2018, McLaughlin uploaded a blog entry to her website announcing a second departure from the show.

In 2023, Lydia and Doug McLaughlin launched their wine business and wine tasting event, Noble Wine & Dine. The exclusive food and wine event showcases and samples wine from collaborative restaurants such as Nobu and Valle amongst others. Their events have featured celebrity chef's Michael Mina, Wolfgang Puck, and Daniel Boulud.

== Bibliography ==
- McLaughlin, Lydia (April 14, 2015) Beyond Orange County: A Housewives Guide to Faith and Happiness. Worthy Books. (ISBN 978-1617954238)
- McLaughlin, Lydia (January 1, 2022) Freedom Through Faith a 6 Week Bible Study. Skylab Media Group. (ISBN 979-8218067212)
- McLaughlin, Lydia (April 4, 2023) JoyFull: 365 Daily Devotions for Women. BroadStreet Publishing Group LLC. (ISBN 978-1424564736)

== Personal life ==
Lydia met Doug McLaughlin in 2003 when the two volunteered at a Young Life organization in Newport Beach. The pair married on April 30, 2006. Together they have three sons, Stirling McLaughlin (b. 2009), Maverick McLaughlin (b. 2011), and Roman McLaughlin (b. 2014). They reside in Laguna Hills, California.

She is a devout Christian who actively teaches women's bible study as she has for the past 20 years.

On April 17, 2025, six months after the loss of her mother Judy, McLaughlin's eldest brother, Geoffrey Stirling Jr., was fatally shot by Newport Beach police during a traffic stop, which she described it as an "unimaginable loss."
