= Jo De La Rosa =

American television personality

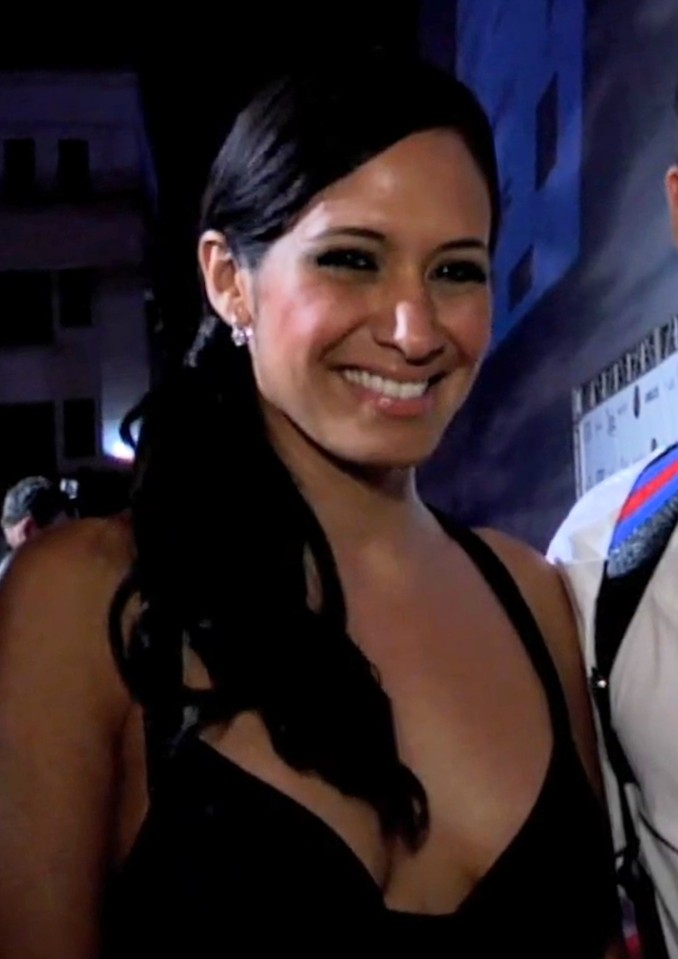
- De La Rosa in 2010
- Television: The Real Housewives of Orange County; Date My Ex: Jo & Slade

Jo De La Rosa is an American television personality.

== Career ==
De La Rosa has been on The Real Housewives of Orange County. She was a cast member on the first two seasons, which aired in 2006 and 2007. De La Rosa also appeared in the third and fourth seasons, as well as the spin-off series Date My Ex: Jo & Slade. She made a guest appearance on the finale of the eighteenth season, as well as making guest appearances, during the nineteenth and twentieth season. Glamour described her as "the franchise's first wild-child wannabe singer". In 2021, Aya Tsintziras included her for the first season in Screen Rant's list of the best cast members for each season, writing: "Jo is the most memorable season 1 housewife, since she shared her daily struggles being engaged to Slade Smiley and trying to be the housewife that he wanted. Jo had a lot to say about wanting to work, and she cared deeply about creating a great future for herself, which is an important part of the show."

In 2007, De La Rosa was signed by the independent record label Immergent Records. She has hosted the podcast Pop Candy. She has also worked in the advertising industry.

== Personal life ==
De La Rosa married composer Taran Gray in 2022, after the two met in 2020 and got engaged in 2021. She was previously engaged to Slade Smiley; their relationship was documented on The Real Housewives.

De La Rosa has lived in Orange County. She lived in Los Angeles in 2020 and Santa Monica in 2021. She has had plastic surgery.

== Filmography ==
- The Real Housewives of Orange County
- Date My Ex: Jo & Slade
