= Gretchen Rossi =

American television personality

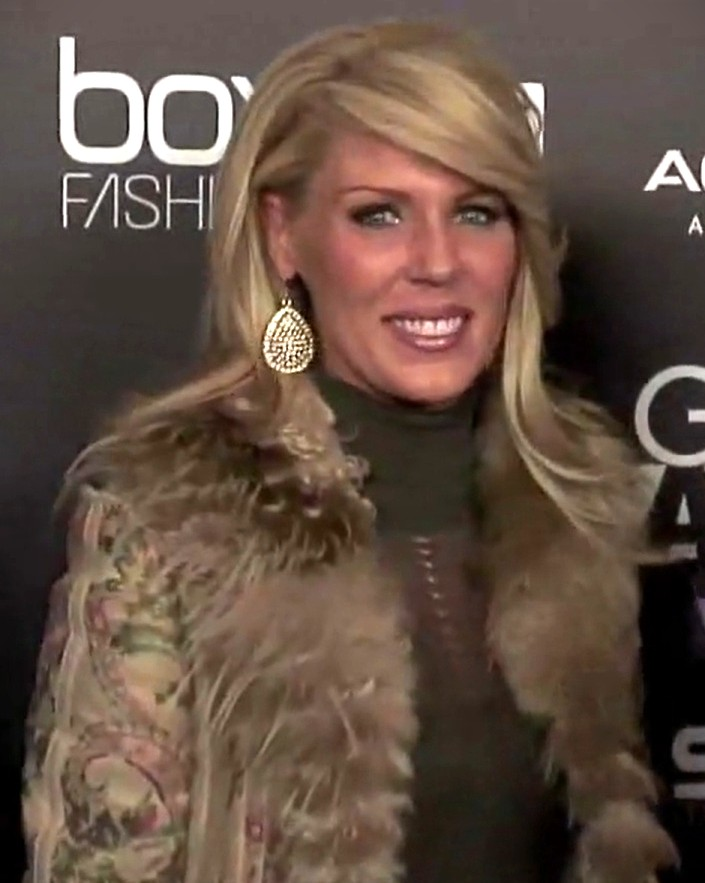
- Rossi in 2009
- Born: October 30, 1978 (age 47); Michigan, United States
- Occupation: Television personality
- Notable work: The Real Housewives of Orange County
- Spouse: Christopher Rossi (m. 2004; div. 2007)
- Partner: Slade Smiley
- Children: 1

Gretchen Rossi (born October 30, 1978) is an American television personality and businesswoman.

== Career ==
Rossi joined The Real Housewives of Orange County in 2008 (season 4) to 2013 (season 8). Rossi returned to The Real Housewives of Orange County as a “friend of the housewives” in 2025 (Season 19). In January 2026, it was confirmed that Rossi would be exiting the series once again after one season.

== Personal life ==
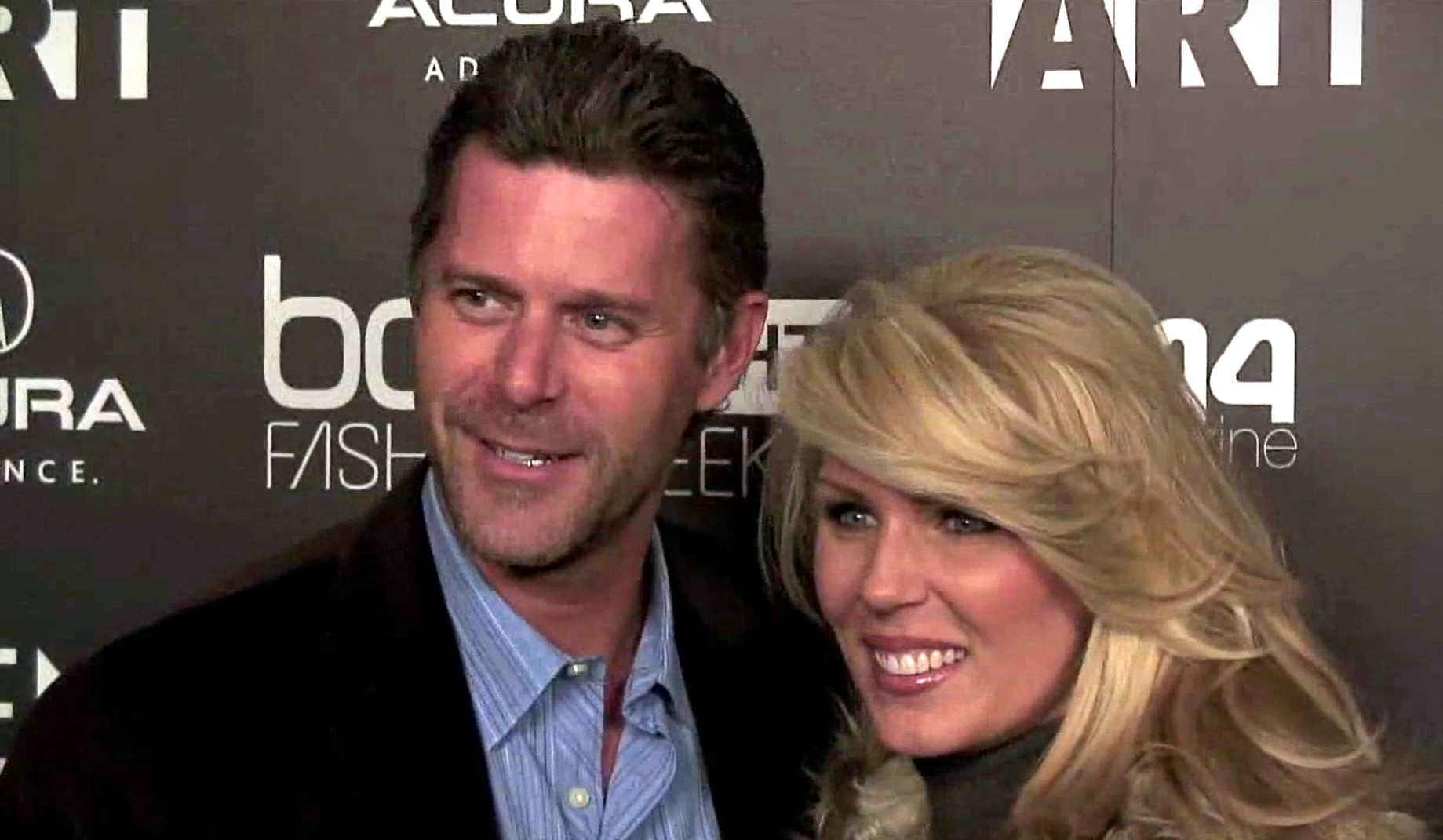
Left to right:Slade Smiley and Rossi in 2009

Rossi is from Michigan. In 2004 she married film technician Chris Rossi, but they divorced in 2007. She is in a relationship with Slade Smiley. The couple have a daughter together. Previously, Rossi was engaged to Jeff Beitzel, who died from cancer.
