= Meghan King =

American television personality

- Born: Meghan O'Toole King; September 26, 1984 (age 42); St. Louis, Missouri, U.S.
- Other name: Meghan King Edmonds
- Education: University of Mississippi (BBA)
- Occupations: Television personality, fashion model, fashion designer
- Known for: The Real Housewives of Orange County
- Spouses: Brad McDill (m. 2007; div. 2011) Jim Edmonds (m. 2014; div. 2021) Cuffe Biden Owens (m. 2021; ann. 2022)
- Children: 3
- Relatives: Valerie Biden Owens (former-mother-in-law)

Meghan King (born September 26, 1984) is an American reality television personality and model. She was a main cast member on the Bravo series The Real Housewives of Orange County (2015–2017) for three seasons and has subsequently appeared as a guest.

== Early life and education ==
King was born on September 26, 1984, in St. Louis, Missouri. She is the sister of model RJ King, professional soccer player Julie King, and model and former Amazing Race contestant Caitlin King. King graduated with a bachelor degree in business administration from the University of Mississippi, specializing in marketing.

== Career ==
Early in her career, King worked as a model in Milan, Italy and in the U.S., saying: "I modeled shortly in Milan, and I hated it. And I didn't speak the language, there weren't smartphones, and I was alone." She worked for fashion brands such as Abercrombie & Fitch and Americana, and appeared in Cosmopolitan magazine. King left modeling to focus on her studies at the University of Mississippi. She has since returned to modeling, and in 2017 she walked the runway at Sha Ali Ahmad's fashion show, and was on the magazine covers of Pump Lifestyle, GEV Magazine and Latina. Prior to moving to California, King worked as a sales representative for a pathology software firm.

In January 2024, King joined real estate company Dielmann Sotheby's Realty as a real estate advisor in Ladue, Missouri.

=== Television ===
She made her first appearance in the workplace reality series Resale Royalty (2013), appearing in all ten episodes. King was one of the team members working at a fashion resale boutique. The series was produced by fashion designer Rachel Zoe's production company Rachel Zoe Productions. Her engagement to Jim Edmonds and search for a wedding dress was documented in an episode of the TLC series, Say Yes to the Dress, which aired on October 24, 2014.

In 2015, Bravo announced that King would join the main cast of The Real Housewives of Orange County for the show's tenth season. She reprised the role in the show's eleventh and twelfth seasons. She appeared in a guest role for the fourteenth season, which aired in 2019. During the show, King's storyline focused on her family life as a new mother, as well as remodeling her home in Newport Beach. In 2020, she was a presenter at the second annual iHeartRadio Podcast Awards.

=== Business ventures ===
In 2019, King launched a podcast, Intimate Knowledge with Meghan King, which focuses on dating, love and life. She hosted the podcast for four years, with the last episode being released on May 22, 2023.

She has gained a large social media following and endorses products such as beauty and wellness products on Instagram. She has done brand collaborations with Amazon and Stanley.

In 2015, King and her former stepdaughter, Lauren Edmonds teamed up with Mother Trucker & Co, and launched a line of hats called Hashtag Hats. In July 2017, King and home fragrance and personal care company K. Hall Studio created a collection of fragrant candles, fragrances and home and beauty products. In August 2024, she teamed up with clothing company SewSewYou to create an activewear collection called Harty Collection. The proceeds of the activewear collection will go toward her son's care amid his health diagnosis.

== Nonprofit involvement ==
On March 16, 2016, King was a speaker at congressional office Rayburn House Office Building in Capitol Hill with Fight Colorectal Cancer. She advocates screenings for colorectal cancer and "a passage of legislation to boost Medicare coverage for colonoscopies," according to The Washington Post. Also in 2016, she received Fight Colorectal Cancer organization's Shining Star Award at their annual awards ceremony. The award is given to public figures who raise awareness and bring attention to colorectal cancer.

After visiting South Africa, King began working with a loungewear brand called LULUSIMONSTUDIO, which is founded by women. She designed a clothing line called The LULUSIMONSTUDIO x Meghan King Capsule Collection, with all of the proceeds being donated to The By Grace Foundation, which helps South African women. In October 2021, she appeared in South African Glamour to discuss her charity work and said: "When I heard about The By Grace Foundation, I immediately knew we’d be a perfect fit. Educating and empowering women who may not otherwise have the opportunity to provide for the family is so important to me."

== Personal life ==
King married Brad McDill in July 2007. They divorced in November 2011.

King married former baseball player and Fox Sports Midwest analyst Jim Edmonds in October 2014. She became a stepmother to Jim's four children and lived half the year in St. Louis and half the year in Newport Beach. The couple had their first child via in vitro fertilization in November 2016. They separated in October 2019 after five years of marriage. They have three children. They finalized their divorce in May 2021.

One of her sons has periventricular leukomalacia and brain damage.

In October 2021, King married lawyer Cuffe Biden Owens, son of Valerie Biden Owens and nephew of President Joe Biden. They separated in December 2021. In March 2022, King stated that she planned to annul the marriage. The marriage was annulled by July 2022.

== Filmography ==
Television
Year	Title	Role	Notes
2013	Resale Royalty	Herself	10 episodes
2014	Say Yes to the Dress	Herself	Episode: "All Hands on Deck"
2014–2019	The Real Housewives of Orange County	Herself	Main role: seasons 10–12, Guest: seasons 9 & 14; 67 episodes
2016	Access Hollywood Live	Herself	Episode dated 17 June 2016; Plugged-In Panel
2023	The Real Housewives of Beverly Hills	Herself	Episode: "Esopha-gate"

Podcasts
Year	Title	Role	Platform	Notes
2019–2023	Intimate Knowledge with Meghan King	Host	IHeartRadio	68 episodes
