= Shannon Storms Beador =

American reality television personality

- Born: Shannon Marion Storms; March 25, 1964 (age 62); Los Angeles, California, U.S.
- Education: University of Southern California (BS)
- Occupation: Television personality
- Known for: The Real Housewives of Orange County (2014–)
- Spouse: David Beador (m. 2000; div. 2019)
- Children: 3

Shannon Marion Storms Beador (/ˌbəˈdɔːr/ bə-DORR, née Storms; born March 25, 1964) is an American reality television personality, best known for a starring role as a housewife in the Bravo reality television series The Real Housewives of Orange County. In 2014, Storms Beador joined for the ninth season of the show, and has appeared as a main cast member on all subsequent seasons.

== Career ==
Storms Beador joined The Real Housewives of Orange County in its ninth season, which aired from April to September 2014. She has appeared as a main cast member on all subsequent seasons, making her the third longest running Orange County housewife- following Vicki Gunvalson and Tamra Judge. After the departure of Gunvalson and Judge following the show's fourteenth season, she became the longest serving current cast member.

In 2018, Storms Beador launched a frozen food line, Real for Real cuisine, which made its QVC debut on April 18 that year. On January 31, 2021, she launched the website for Real for Real with the supplement 'Lemon-Aid Daily'.

== Personal life ==
In 2000, Storms Beador married contractor David Beador. In June 2015, the premier of the tenth season of The Real Housewives of Orange County saw Storms Beador reveal that her husband had had an eight month affair with another woman. The couple eventually separated in 2017, and their divorce was finalized in 2019. Storms Beador was awarded $1.4 million in the divorce settlement in addition to $10,000 a month for 10 years in combined child and spousal support, with the last payment to be paid on April 1, 2029.

Storms Beador and her three daughters contracted COVID-19 in July 2020. Her experience with the virus was detailed in the fifteenth season of The Real Housewives of Orange County, which was filming at the time.

In September 2023, Storms Beador was arrested for a DUI hit-and-run to which she subsequently pleaded no contest. She was sentenced to probation and community service.

== Filmography ==
Television roles
Year	Title	Role	Notes
2014 – Present	The Real Housewives of Orange County	Herself	223 episodes: Main Cast: Seasons 9–
2015–2020, 2022 – Present	Watch What Happens Live!	Herself	29 Episodes, Ongoing Guest
2015	Girlfriend's Guide To Divorce	Herself	1 Episode: Don't Blow The Bubble (S2, E2)
2019	Ex-Housewife	Herself	1 Episode (S1, E5)
2026	The Real Housewives Ultimate Girls Trip	Herself	Guest: 1 Episode
2026	Still Flipping Out	Herself	Guest: 1 Episode
