= Tamra Judge =

American reality TV personality (born 1967)

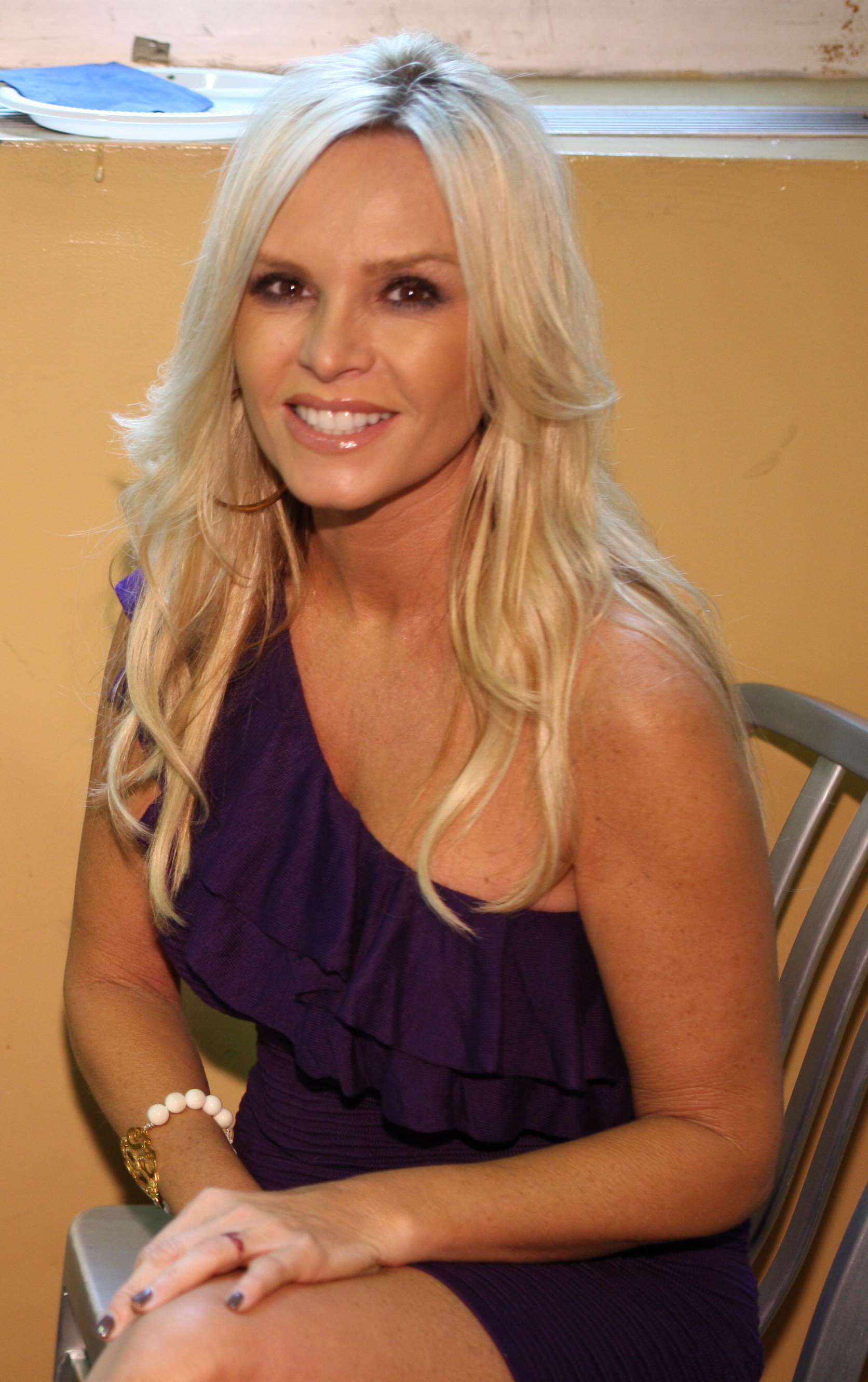
- Judge in 2010
- Born: Tamra Sue Waddle; September 2, 1967 (age 59); Glendora, California, U.S.
- Other name: Tamra Barney
- Occupation: Television personality
- Known for: The Real Housewives of Orange County
- Spouses: Darren Vieth (m. 1985; div. 1990) Simon Barney (m. 1998; div. 2011) Eddie Judge (m. 2013)
- Children: 4

Tamra Sue Judge (née Waddle; formerly Barney; born September 2, 1967) is an American businesswoman and television personality. She is a cast member of Bravo reality television show The Real Housewives of Orange County, first appearing on its third season in 2008.

== Early life ==
Tamra Sue Waddle was born on September 2, 1967 in Glendora, California. She has English, Irish, Scottish, German, Swiss, and Dutch ancestry. She graduated from Glendora High School in 1985.

== Career ==
Before joining The Real Housewives of Orange County, Judge obtained her manicurist license, attending Covina Beauty College, and worked as a realtor on and off.

In 2007, it was announced that Judge would be joining the third season of The Real Housewives. Judge stayed as a main cast member for twelve seasons until her departure in 2020 after the fourteenth season. However, in 2022, Judge was announced to be returning to the seventeenth season of the show after a two season hiatus, officially announcing her return on Watch What Happens Live!.

In 2013, Tamra and her now husband Eddie appeared in the second The Real Housewives spin-off: Tamra's OC Wedding, which documented their wedding. In 2013, Judge and her husband Eddie founded a fitness studio called CUT Fitness, which was located in Rancho Santa Margarita, California. They closed the fitness studio in 2022 after nearly ten years in business.

In 2020, after her brief departure from The Real Housewives, Judge resumed her real estate career. Along with continuing her career in real estate, she launched 'Vena CBD' with her husband. They began the business after Eddie's struggle with atrial fibrillation. The business title is derived from “Vena Cava,” in reference to the two largest veins in the human body that carry blood to the heart. Judge also started a podcast, named Two Ts In A Pod, with former The Real Housewives of Beverly Hills cast member Teddi Mellencamp Arroyave.

In 2022, Judge appeared in season two as one of eight women on the reality television show The Real Housewives Ultimate Girls Trip. In 2024, she appeared as a contestant on the second season of Peacock's reality competition series The Traitors.

== Personal life ==
She was married to Darren Vieth from 1985 to 1990 and she gave birth to her first child, Ryan, when she was 19 years old.

She was married to Simon Barney from 1998 to 2011, and they have three children together.

In 2013, she married Eddie Judge on June 15.

== Filmography ==
Year	Title	Role	Notes	Ref
2007–2019, 2023–present	The Real Housewives of Orange County	Herself	Main cast (seasons 3–14, 17–)	
2009–present	Watch What Happens Live!	Herself	32 episodes, Guest	
2010	Who Wants to Be a Millionaire	Herself	Celebrity Question Presenter	
2013	Tamra's OC Wedding	Herself	3 episodes	
2022, 2026	The Real Housewives Ultimate Girls Trip	Herself	Main cast (season 2), Guest (season 5)	
2023	Celebrity Family Feud	Herself	Contestant; Episode: Pete Holmes vs. Jared Padalecki and Real Housewives of OC vs. Real Housewives of ATL	
2024	The Traitors	Herself	Contestant on season 2; Eliminated in episode 5	
