= Maryland Route 159 =

State highway in Harford County, Maryland, US, known as Perryman Rd

Maryland Route 159
- Maryland Route 159 highlighted in red

Route information
- Maintained by MDSHA
- Length: 4.73 mi (7.61 km)
- Existed: 1928–present

Major junctions
- South end: Dead end at Bush River near Perryman
- North end: US 40 / MD 7 in Aberdeen

Location
- Country: United States
- State: Maryland
- Counties: Harford

Highway system
- Maryland highway system; Interstate; US; State; Scenic Byways
← MD 158	→ MD 161

Maryland Route 159 (MD 159) is a state highway located in Harford County in the U.S. state of Maryland. Known for most of its length as Perryman Road, the state highway runs 4.73 miles (7.61 km) from a dead end at the Bush River near Perryman north to U.S. Route 40 (US 40) and MD 7 in Aberdeen. The northernmost part of MD 159 was constructed in the early 1920s and became the original alignment of US 40. The Perryman Road portion of MD 159 was constructed in the late 1920s and early 1930s. MD 159 was extended west along what was MD 7 to US 40 in 1950.

== Route description ==
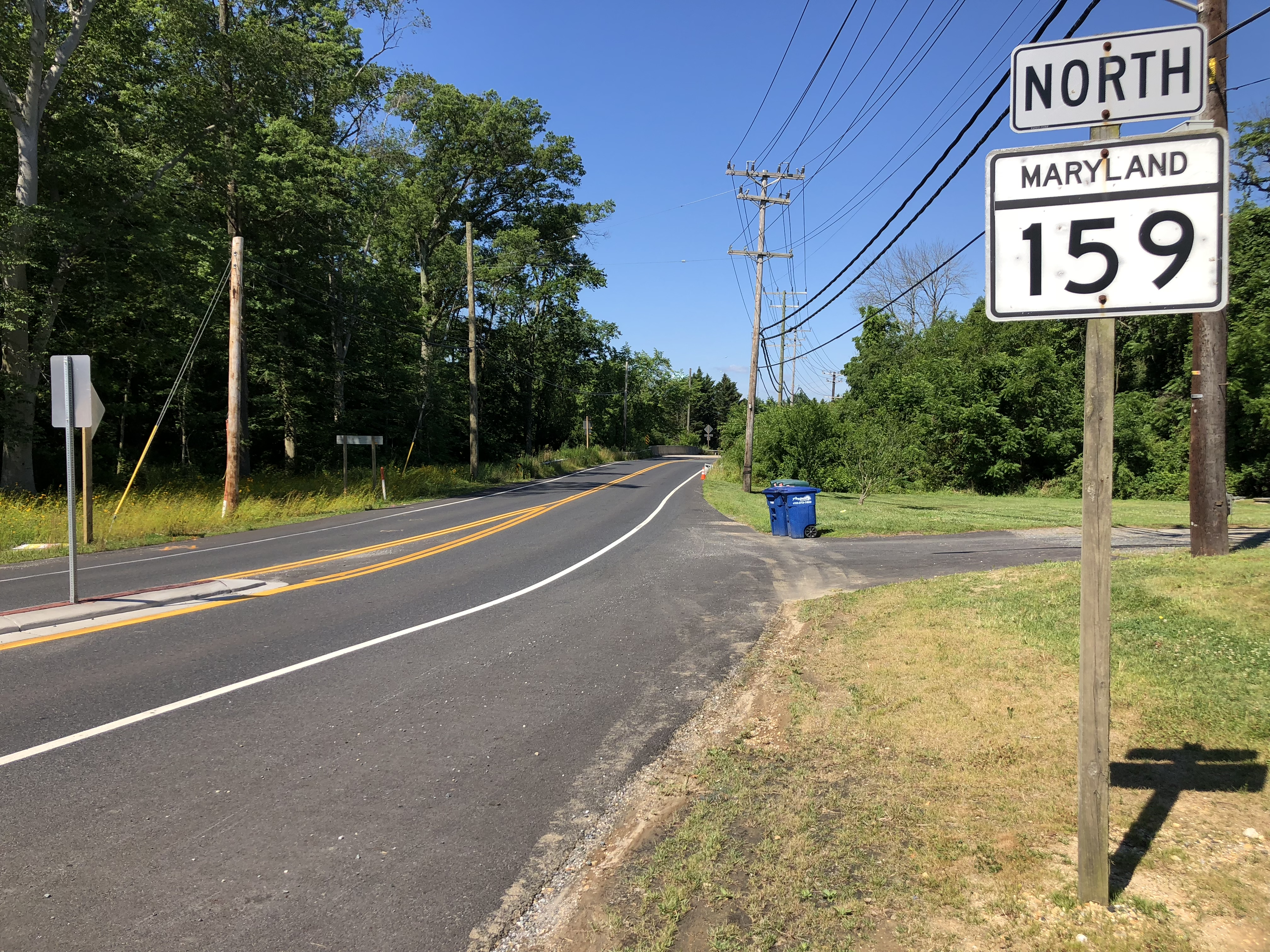
View north along MD 159 near Aberdeen

MD 159 begins at a dead end at the Bush River. The state highway heads northeast as Perryman Road, a two-lane undivided road that closely parallels Amtrak's Northeast Corridor railroad line, which also serves MARC's Penn Line. MD 159 serves the Perryman Peninsula, an area of land between the Bush River estuary and Aberdeen Proving Ground. A small portion of this area is on the south side of the railroad and is accessed via Chelsea Road, at which northbound MD 159 has a stop sign in the village of Perryman, where the highway veers away from the Amtrak line and passes St. George's Parish Vestry House. North of Perryman, the state highway passes several distribution centers before reaching Old Philadelphia Road at a roundabout, onto which MD 159 turns west. The state highway crosses over Cranberry Run and passes south of the Griffith House and north of a trailer park before reaching its northern terminus at an oblique intersection with US 40 (Philadelphia Boulevard) just south of the city limits of Aberdeen. Old Philadelphia Road continues west as MD 7 toward Riverside.

== History ==
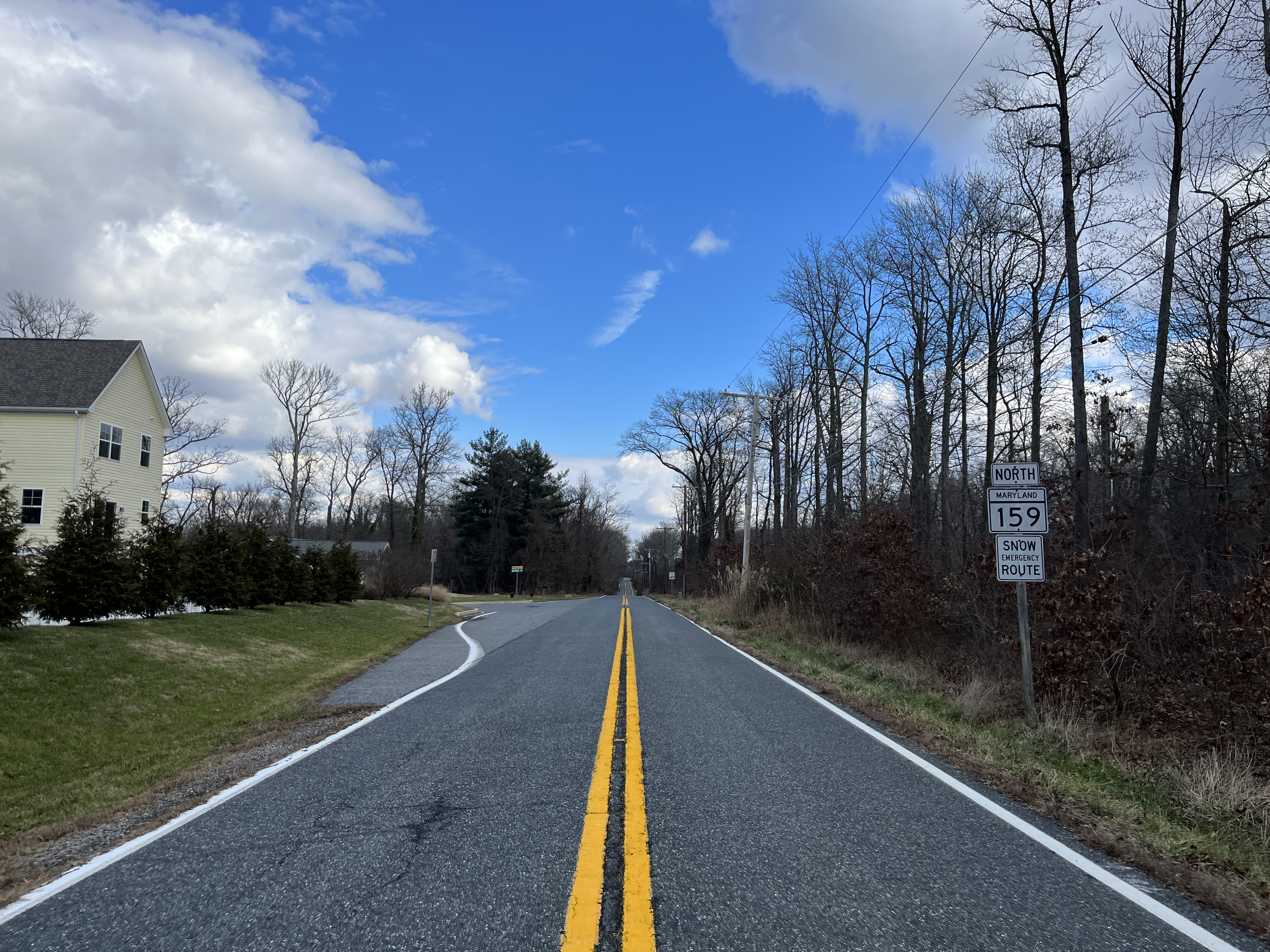
View north along MD 159 near its southern terminus near Perryman

The Old Philadelphia Road portion of MD 159 is part of the original alignment of US 40. The section that MD 159 now follows was constructed of concrete around 1923. After US 40 was moved to the newly completed Philadelphia Boulevard (part of Pulaski Highway) in 1937, Old Philadelphia Road became part of MD 7. Perryman Road was reconstructed as a concrete state highway from US 40 to Chelsea Road in Perryman in 1928. MD 159 was completed to Bush River by 1933 in two sections: a macadam segment from Chelsea Road to Canning House Road and a gravel segment to the road's end. The gravel section was upgraded to a more modern surface in 1950. Also in 1950, MD 7 was truncated at US 40; MD 159 was extended west to US 40 from the old MD 7–MD 159 intersection.

== Future ==
There are plans, currently on hold due to lack of funding, to construct a roundabout at the intersection of Perryman Road and Old Philadelphia Road. Once the roundabout and other minor improvements to the state highway are completed, MD 159 will be removed from the state highway system and transferred to county maintenance.

== Junction list ==
The entire route is in Harford County.

Location	mi	km	Destinations	Notes
Perryman	0.00	0.00	Dead end at Bush River	Southern terminus
Aberdeen	4.39	7.07	Old Philadelphia Road north	Roundabout; MD 159 turns west onto Old Philadelphia Road
Aberdeen	4.73	7.61	US 40 (Pulaski Highway) / MD 7 west (Old Philadelphia Road) – Havre de Grace, Edgewood, Riverside	Northern terminus; eastern terminus of MD 7
1.000 mi = 1.609 km; 1.000 km = 0.621 mi

== Auxiliary route ==
MD 159A is the designation for an unnamed 0.05-mile (0.080 km) spur north from MD 159 just south of its intersection with Chelsea Road in Perryman.
