= The Real Housewives of Orange County season 3 =

The Real Housewives of Orange County
- Season 3
- Cover used by Amazon (Left to right) Barney, Gunvalson, Keough, Waring, and Knickerbocker (Not pictured) Fry
- Starring: Vicki Gunvalson; Jeana Keough; Lauri Waring; Tammy Knickerbocker; Tamra Barney; Quinn Fry
- No. of episodes: 12

Release
- Original network: Bravo
- Original release: November 6, 2007 – January 29, 2008

Season chronology
- ← Previous; Season 2 Next → Season 4

The third season of The Real Housewives of Orange County, an American reality television series, was broadcast on Bravo. It aired from November 6, 2007 until January 29, 2008, and was primarily filmed in Orange County, California. Its executive producers are Adam Karpel, Alex Baskin, Douglas Ross, Gregory Stewart, Scott Dunlop, Stephanie Boyriven and Andy Cohen.

The Real Housewives of Orange County focuses on the lives of Vicki Gunvalson, Jeana Keough, Lauri Waring, Tammy Knickerbocker, Tamra Barney, and Quinn Fry. It consisted of 12 episodes, all of which aired on Tuesday evenings.

This season marked the final regular appearance of Tammy Knickerbocker and only regular appearance of Quinn Fry.

== Production and crew ==
The season premiere "Behind the Orange Curtain" was aired on November 6, 2007, while the eleventh episode "Here Comes the Bride" served as the season finale, and was aired on January 22, 2008. It was followed by a reunion special that aired on January 29, 2008, which marked the conclusion of the season. Adam Karpel, Alex Baskin, Douglas Ross, Gregory Stewart, Scott Dunlop, Stephanie Boyriven and Andy Cohen are recognized as the series' executive producers; it is produced and distributed by Evolution Media.

== Cast and synopsis ==
Four of the five housewives featured on the second season of The Real Housewives of Orange County returned for the third installment. Jo De La Rosa departed the series; after breaking up with Slade Smiley, De La Rosa moved to Los Angeles to pursue a singing career. Two new housewives filled De La Rosa's place, spitfire Tamra Barney and devout Christian Quinn Fry.

Barney tries easing the tension between her adult son Ryan and her husband Simon, after the former moves back into the family home. Barney approaches turning 40 and will try anything to stay young, which includes botox, clubbing and riding on the back of a Harley Davidson. Fry made her mid-season debut on the series during the sixth episode "The Boys of Summer", on December 11, 2007. Fry, a devout Christian balances faith and her love for younger men. Through the rest of the season Quinn juggles two younger men that she is dating, Billy and Jared. Vicki Gunvalson's struggle from last season continues as she experiences difficulty accepting her children Michael and Briana's independence as young adults, and sees her relationship with her husband Donn suffer from her commitment to expanding her insurance company. Tension between Gunvalson and Jeana Keough arise, as Gunvalson rents out her property through Keough. Keough's kids continue to grow as Shane leaves to play minor league baseball in Canada, Colton becomes more like his brother, and Kara graduates highschool. Keough has had enough of her husband's resistance and lack of parenting and files for separation from Matt. Tammy Knickerbocker and her daughters deal with the sudden death of Knickerbocker's ex-husband Lou, who is also her daughter's father. With the death her ex-husband, Knickerbocker's daughter begin to lash out and party too much. Waring continues to celebrate her engagement and plans her wedding to George Peterson. Lauri marries George with her son's attendance, and is now known as Lauri Peterson.

== Episodes ==
The Real Housewives of Orange County season 3 episodes
No. overall	No. in season	Title	Original release date	U.S. viewers (millions)
19	1	"Behind the Orange Curtain"	November 6, 2007	N/A
Vicki gives Briana a new car. Lauri is busy with wedding plans. Tammy and her daughters experience a tragedy. Kara graduates from high school, and the cast is joined by new housewife Tamra Barney, following Jo De La Rosa's departure.
20	2	"My Baby is All Grown Up"	November 13, 2007	N/A
Vicki and Jeana make a pact to get in shape. Vicki has buyer's remorse after buying a smaller home. The Keoughs leave for northern California.
21	3	"Girls Gone Wild"	November 20, 2007	N/A
McKenzie, Lindsey, Megan and Ashley head to South Beach, Miami. Vicki and Donn host a weekend at their vacation home; tensions build between Simon and Ryan putting Tamra in the middle.
22	4	"Pantry Raid!"	November 27, 2007	N/A
All the housewives have dinner together. Vicki and Jeana are in week six of boot camp. Tamra gets Botox and goes clubbing with her husband and son.
23	5	"Rebels Without a Cause"	December 4, 2007	N/A
Vicki visits her daughter Briana and discusses her future with Colby. A booze cruise turns ugly. Tamra has regrets about her son.
24	6	"The Boys of Summer"	December 11, 2007	N/A
Lauri and Ashley discuss wedding plans over lunch. Michael begins an internship in Seattle. Jeana and Colton travel to Vancouver to watch Shane play minor league baseball. Tamra's business leaves little time for her husband. New housewife Quinn Fry is introduced.
25	7	"Moving Violations"	December 18, 2007	N/A
The housewives head to San Diego for time together. A conflict between Jeana and Vicki threatens their friendship. Lauri travels to Oklahoma to spend time with Sophie.
26	8	"Family Vacation"	January 1, 2008	N/A
Lauri and George plan a family vacation. Vicki invites Jeana and her children on their family vacation. Tamra struggles to find time with Simon.
27	9	"Frienemies"	January 8, 2008	N/A
Vicki berates Jeana. Lauri asks her daughter to be her Maid of Honor. Quinn tries to force Billy to commit. Tamra helps Ryan move out of her house.
28	10	"Diamonds Are a Girl's Best Friend"	January 15, 2008	N/A
Tamra celebrates her 40th birthday aboard Simon's new yacht. Jeana contemplates divorce. Quinn and Billy have different ideas about their relationship.
29	11	"Here Comes the Bride"	January 22, 2008	2.39
In the season three finale, the ladies celebrate Lauri's wedding.
30	12	"Real Housewives Confess: A Watch What Happens Special"	January 29, 2008	1.33
All six of the Housewives reunite for a sit and tell.
