= The Real Housewives of Orange County season 4 =

Season of television series

The Real Housewives of Orange County
- Season 4
- Cover used by iTunes (Left to right) Rossi, Keough, Peterson, Gunvalson, and Barney (Not pictured) Curtin
- Starring: Vicki Gunvalson; Jeana Keough; Lauri Peterson; Tamra Barney; Lynne Curtin; Gretchen Rossi
- No. of episodes: 15

Release
- Original network: Bravo
- Original release: November 25, 2008 – June 11, 2009

Season chronology
- ← Previous; Season 3 Next → Season 5

The fourth season of The Real Housewives of Orange County, an American reality television series, was broadcast on Bravo. It aired from November 25, 2008 until June 11, 2009, and was primarily filmed in Orange County, California. Its executive producers are Adam Karpel, Alex Baskin, Douglas Ross, Gregory Stewart, Scott Dunlop, Stephanie Boyriven and Andy Cohen.

The Real Housewives of Orange County focuses on the lives of Vicki Gunvalson, Jeana Keough, Lauri Peterson, Tamra Barney, Lynne Curtin and Gretchen Rossi. It consisted of 15 episodes.

This season marked the final regular appearance of Lauri Peterson.

== Production and crew ==
In April, 2008 The Real Housewives of Orange County was renewed for a fourth season by Bravo. The season premiere "Are They For Real?" was aired on November 25, 2008, while the thirteenth episode "Bling Bling" served as the season finale, and was aired on February 17, 2009. It was followed by a reunion special that aired on January 29, 2008, and a "Lost Footage" episode on June 11, 2009, which marked the conclusion of the season. Adam Karpel, Alex Baskin, Douglas Ross, Gregory Stewart, Scott Dunlop, Stephanie Boyriven and Andy Cohen are recognized as the series' executive producers; it is produced and distributed by Evolution Media.

== Cast and synopsis ==
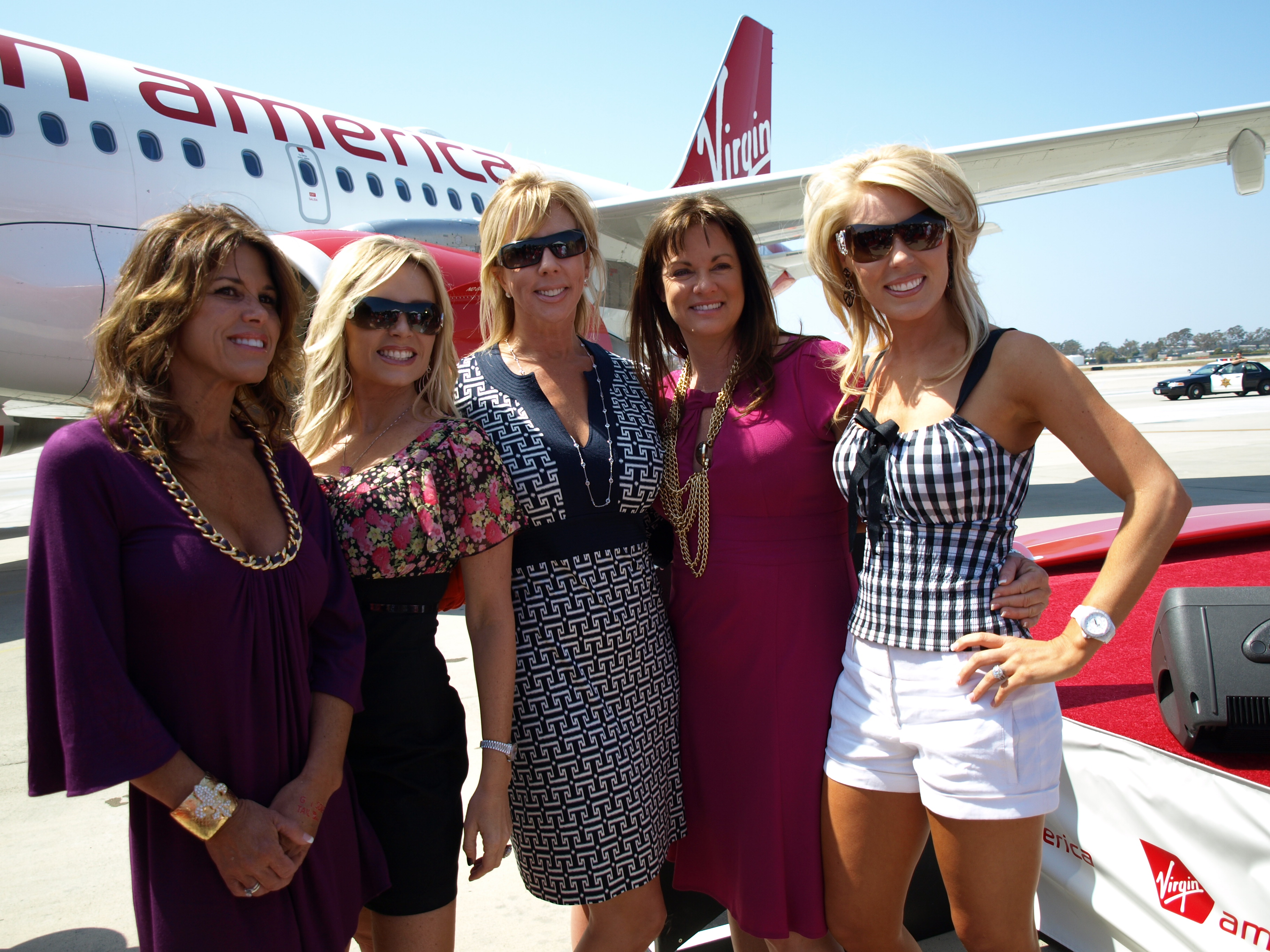
The cast of season four (except Peterson)

Four of the six housewives featured on the third season of The Real Housewives of Orange County initially returned for the fourth installment. Prior to the season airing, Tammy Knickerbocker and Quinn Fry had departed the series. Both wives have guest appearances later on in the series. Lauri Peterson left the series during the third episode "Love Tanks" that aired on December 9, 2008. Peterson's reason for departing the series were to focus on her family due to her son's issues with drugs. Two new housewives filled Knickerbocker and Peterson's place. Gretchen Rossi was added as a full time cast member at the beginning of the season and Lynne Curtin, on the fourth episode "You Just Don't Get It", the episode after Peterson's departure.

Peterson in beginning was enjoying the perks of marriage to her newlywed, George Peterson. After distancing herself from the group, Lauri's fairytale is put in jeopardy when family matters arise regarding her son Josh, and in effect Peterson departs the series to focus on her family. Rossi tends to her fiancé Jeff, who is battling a rare form of leukemia. The women question Rossi's intentions due to the couple's significant age gap of 23 years, and Rossi's reputation as a party girl. Throughout the season Rossi attempts to lift her spirits away from Jeff's illness by hosting a burlesque evening, spending time with her family at Lake Bass and going to Hollywood to celebrates her friend, and former housewife, Jo De La Rosa's musical success. Rossi and Tamra Barney feud over the allegation of Rossi being a "gold-digger" and Barney’s questioning of Rossi's actions away from Jeff. With their tensions rising, Barney and fellow housewife Vicki Gunvalson set Rossi up at a premium tequila tasting at Barney's formal dinner. Rossi ends up disappearing from the dinner with Barney's son Ryan, leaving the other ladies worried. Barney supports her mom after she continues to mourn her break-up, so Tamra helps her mom get a face lift to jumpstart her dating life. Barney's son Ryan continues to struggle with work commitment, with new career aspirations Barney is left surprised. Curtin is introduced to the series, along with her two daughters Raquel and Alexa. The eldest, Raquel, convinces Curtin to allow her to have a huge 18th birthday celebration at the house. Curtin struggles with her daughter's behavior, which leaves her feeling unappreciated and worried. After meeting the ladies, Curtin begins being on the outs with the ladies due to being friends with Rossi, Curtin befriends Jeana at the races. Away from the group, Curtin pursues her business endeavors of designing jewelry, however Gunvalson insists Curtin doesn't know how to work which later leaves the two feuding. Keough balances her family when her daughter returns home after a tough year in college, also at the house is Keough's husband, Matt, who she has been separated from for a year. Away from family, Keough continues to make money, despite the real estate market being in the dumps in Orange County. Keough attempts to rebuild herself while entering the "post-separation" phase of her life, later having her husband move out and getting back into the dating game. Keough and Gunvalson begin to feud, over last season's rental issues. Matters are made worse when Keough brings her friend and Gunvalson's former tenant around. Despite their previous drama, Keough and Gunvalson take a trip to Chicago to visit Gunvalson's friends from high school as well as original wife Kimberly Bryant. Gunvalson continues to struggle balancing her personal and professional life, and it only gets worse when she considers buying a yacht. She and her husband Donn continue to bicker and Gunvalson struggles to be civil to Donn, also claiming that her "love tank" is empty.

== Episodes ==
The Real Housewives of Orange County season 4 episodes
No. overall	No. in season	Title	Original release date	U.S. viewers (millions)
31	1	"Are They For Real?"	November 25, 2008	N/A
The housewives are back for more drama. Vicki thinks about buying a yacht. Tamra deals with family issues, while the romance continues for Lauri. The newest housewife on the block, Gretchen, meets with her realtor, Jeana, to view a home in Coto with her fiancé, Jeff, who has leukemia.
32	2	"Hold on To Your Daddies"	December 2, 2008	N/A
Troubles occur in Vicki's marriage after an explosive dinner. Tamra doesn't take a liking to Gretchen, and talks about her to the other housewives.
33	3	"Love Tanks"	December 9, 2008	N/A
Gretchen goes with her fiance Jeff to the Indy 500 and gets the VIP treatment as she gets to ride around the track. Vicki's marriage continues its downward spiral when she and Don accompany Tamra and her husband on a romantic trip to Napa. Lauri makes the choice to leave the show.
34	4	"You Just Don't Get It"	December 16, 2008	N/A
Briana is nervous when her family considers buying an expensive yacht. Meanwhile, Gretchen throws a "risque" party without her fiance. Finally, Lynne joins the cast of the Real Housewives of Orange County and causes trouble.
35	5	"120 in the Shade"	December 23, 2008	N/A
The Housewives head out for a fourth of July party, and fireworks happen on and off the screen.
36	6	"Cut!"	December 30, 2008	N/A
Lynne's daughter acts selfishly when planning her expensive birthday party, the housewives get together for a dinner, and things go wrong as Tamra brings drama to the table.
37	7	"And They're Off..."	January 6, 2009	N/A
Drama and tensions flare at the racetrack when one of the Housewives makes an extremely rude comment toward the others.
38	8	"Naked Wasted"	January 13, 2009	N/A
Gretchen struggles to continue caring for her sick fiance, while Vicki heads out to Chicago. Tamra and Vicki plot to get revenge on Gretchen at a dinner party.
39	9	"Why Are You Being So Mean To Me?"	January 20, 2009	N/A
Gretchen's drunken behavior causes tension with the group. Meanwhile, Lynne has huge success with her jewelry business despite reservations from others.
40	10	"The Girls Want to Come Out and Play"	January 27, 2009	N/A
Jeana and Vicki plan a road trip, but Jeana brings along a friend and upsets Vicki.
41	11	"Vegas Baby"	February 3, 2009	N/A
The Housewives all head out to the city of sin for a weekend of fun. Fortunately, Gretchen's fiance is released from the hospital.
42	12	"Who's Your Daddy?"	February 10, 2009	N/A
Vicki launches her L.I.F.E. with Vicki cruise and is thrilled to get so much attention from her colleagues, but is frustrated when she can't seem to get any props from her own family. Jeana and her daughter, Kara, drive to up to Berkeley to move Kara into her apartment. They find themselves strangers among the "bums" and "hippies." Tamra visits her dad in Iowa and puts it all on the line, spilling her heart out to her estranged father. Gretchen does Dallas, reuniting with her four best friends from college. Lynne and her husband, Frank, take a romantic getaway to San Diego leaving their teenage daughters, Raquel and Alexa, home... with Grandma.
43	13	"Bling Bling"	February 17, 2009	2.00
In the Season 4 finale, Lynne forces her daughter to try to get a job. Meanwhile, the Housewives throw an end of the summer party for everyone.
44	14	"Real Housewives Confess: A Watch What Happens Special"	February 24, 2009	2.20
Andy Cohen reunites the Real Housewives of Orange County for another installment of their reunion series. Lauri returns for the reunion and tells us where she and her family stand. And talk about Jeff's death.
45	15	"The Lost Footage"	June 11, 2009	N/A
Bravo offers up an exclusive look at previously unaired footage from the Real Housewives of Orange County Season 4.
