= The Real Housewives of Orange County season 2 =

Season of television series

The Real Housewives of Orange County
- Season 2
- Cover used by the iTunes Store (Left to right) Gunvalson, Keough, De La Rosa, Waring, and Knickerbocker
- Starring: Jo De La Rosa; Vicki Gunvalson; Jeana Keough; Lauri Waring; Tammy Knickerbocker
- No. of episodes: 10

Release
- Original network: Bravo
- Original release: January 13 – March 20, 2007

Season chronology
- ← Previous; Season 1 Next → Season 3

The second season of The Real Housewives of Orange County, an American reality television series, was broadcast on Bravo. It aired from January 16, 2007 until March 20, 2007, and was primarily filmed in Orange County, California. Its executive producers are Adam Karpel, Alex Baskin, Douglas Ross, Gregory Stewart, Scott Dunlop, Stephanie Boyriven and Andy Cohen.

The Real Housewives of Orange County focuses on the lives of Jo De La Rosa, Vicki Gunvalson, Jeana Keough, Lauri Waring and Tammy Knickerbocker. It consisted of 10 episodes, all of which aired on Tuesday evenings.

This season marked the final regular appearance of Jo De La Rosa.

== Production and crew ==
The season premiere "The Housewives are Back!" was aired on January 16, 2007, while the seventh episode "The Finale" served as the season finale, and was aired on March 13, 2007. It was followed by a reunion special that aired on March 20, 2007, on Watch What Happens Live, which marked the conclusion of the season. Adam Karpel, Alex Baskin, Douglas Ross, Gregory Stewart, Scott Dunlop, Stephanie Boyriven and Andy Cohen are recognized as the series' executive producers; it is produced and distributed by Evolution Media.

== Cast and synopsis ==
Four of the five housewives featured on the first season of The Real Housewives of Orange County returned for the second installment. Kimberly Bryant didn't return to the series as a cast member and officially departed the series during the first episode, after deciding to move to Chicago following a skin cancer scare. Season 2 saw the introduction of a new housewife, Tammy Knickerbocker, a divorced mother who tries to balance raising her daughters Megan and Lindsey with dealing with her ex-boyfriend Duff, who's interested in reconciling and dating. Tammy searches for a new place to live in the community after her house is severely damaged by a flood. Jeana spends most of her time focusing on being a Mother. Keough's son Shane is home-bound due to a back injury and his bad attitude gets on everyone's nerves. Keough encourages Colton, her youngest son's sporting endeavors and encourages her daughter to attend a good "networking" university. Keough continues to struggle in her marriage, often feeling like she is a single parent and feeling Matt's resistance. Vicki continues to focus of her work and family, but struggles to separate the two. Jo De La Rosa and Smiley had separated and reconciled on several occasions between production of the first and second seasons, during which period Smiley briefly dated Lauri Waring which in effect cause conflict between the two wives. Throughout the season De La Rosa is shown pursuing her interest in the music industry and Los Angeles. Waring's son, Josh, is away receiving treatment for his bad behavior, she meets the man of her dreams, George Peterson, who she later gets engaged to. Waring peruses a career away from Vicki's insurance company.

== Episodes ==
The Real Housewives of Orange County season 2 episodes
No. overall	No. in season	Title	Original release date
9	1	"The Housewives are Back!"	January 16, 2007
The ladies return for the second season premiere, and with Kimberly gone — a new housewife moves in.
10	2	"Be Nice to the New Girl"	January 23, 2007
Vicki drives her family, friends and co-workers insane as she preps for a relaxing two-week cruise to Europe.
11	3	"Watch Out Bitches!"	January 30, 2007
Lauri buys a conservative black dress to go to a Republican fund raiser at the St. Regis Hotel.
12	4	"Relationships Are Better Than Your Head"	February 6, 2007
Unresolved tension between Jo and Lauri stemming from Lauri's relationship with Slade comes to a head.
13	5	"Stranger in Your House"	February 13, 2007
Jeana welcomes a strange house guest into her home when Shane invites a girl he met on the Internet to come spend a few days with them.
14	6	"Studio, Jewelry, and Babies"	February 20, 2007
Jo has her first studio taping and encounters some difficulties. She blames it on her love of coffee, but it is later revealed that her dependence on Slade is causing the problems. Tammy has locked her youngest daughter out of the house to prevent her from throwing a party. The girl manages to sneak in and throw a party, but she cleans up after it, leaving no trace. Both of Tammy's daughters go for a horse ride and try to convince their father to buy them a horse. When Lauri walks out of a photo shoot for the O.C. housewives, she discovers that her fiancé has bought her a new car. Lauri and her business partner start working on their jewelry while she looks for an investor. Jeana and Vicki go on a cooking-themed girls' night out and have a good time. Jeana's daughter misses her boyfriend, who is at college, and her brother Shane teases her about it.
15	7	"Jo Jo the Housewife"	February 27, 2007
Colton and Kara prepare for the new school year by buying new clothes, while Jeane hires a dog trainer to tame their dogs, who are still out of control. Jo tells Slade she's moving to L.A. Tammy, tired of being single, starts dating once again. The ladies, excluding Jo, visit an astrologer and are amazed how accurate their readings are.
16	8	"Birthday Sex"	March 6, 2007
It is Jeana's birthday and no husband but Vicki's husband Don comes at least. And the rest of the Orange County girls are not pleased with Jeana's husband. Jo has a big meeting with a record company about her first single. The teens of Orange County are 'Angels' for Tammy's ex husband's new sport drink.
17	9	"Finale"	March 13, 2007
Jo gets dumped by her boyfriend Slade. Lauri gets a ring. Lauri's son Josh moves into the town house next season but "breaks house rules" and is kicked out and then moved into Lauri's new husband's ex-wife's house.
18	10	"Real Housewives Confess: A Watch What Happens Special"	March 20, 2007
The housewives get together to discuss Season 2 and update us on the recent events from behind the scenes.
