= Fair use (trademark law) =

Allowed normal use of a trademark

In the United States, trademark law includes a fair use defense, sometimes called "trademark fair use" to distinguish it from the better-known fair use doctrine in copyright.

Many trademarks are adapted from words or symbols that are common to the culture, as Apple, Inc. using a trademark that is based upon the apple. Other trademarks are invented by the mark owner (such as Kodak) and have no common use until introduced by the owner. Courts have recognized that ownership of a trademark or service mark cannot be used to prevent others from using the word or symbol in accord with its plain and ordinary meaning, such as if the trademark is a descriptive word or common symbol such as a pine tree. As a result, the less distinctive or original the trademark, the less able the trademark owner will be to control how it is used.

For the potentially infringing use of a trademark or service mark, fair use by a non-owner of the mark falls under two categories:

- Nominative fair use: referencing a mark to identify the actual goods and services that the trademark holder identifies with the mark. For example, it is not trademark infringement to refer to a printer produced by Casio as a "Casio printer".
- Descriptive fair use: Using a descriptive mark in an ordinary, descriptive manner to describe a product or service. For example, describing a component within a dehumidifier as "honeycomb-shaped" was a fair use of a registered trademark for HONEYCOMBE dehumidifiers. In other words, for descriptive fair use to arise, the following must be true:
  - Plaintiff owns a mark that is descriptive of its goods or services (i.e., it immediately conveys information regarding quality, characteristic, function, feature, or intended use of the goods/services). If Plaintiff's mark is suggestive (i.e., it requires thought or imagination to understand the nature of the underlying goods or services, such as TIDE for laundry detergent), arbitrary (i.e., a word or phrase that exists in language, but has no relation to the goods or services, such as APPLE for computers), or fanciful (i.e., a new word, created as a trademark, such as KODAK for cameras), descriptive fair use does not apply.
  - Defendant uses the mark as a descriptive word or phrase (i.e., to accurately describe something). If Defendant uses the mark as a trademark (i.e., a brand, product name, company name, etc.) or if Defendant uses the term in a suggestive manner, it is not descriptive fair use.

Nominative fair use of a mark may also occur within the context of comparative advertising.

Under U.S. Supreme Court precedent, the fair use defense in trademark law is not precluded by the possibility of confusion. However, courts may consider the possibility of confusion in analyzing whether a use is fair or not. Intent to show confusion is also relevant; hence, as a general rule the trademark should be used no more than necessary for the legitimate purpose. By the same token, use of a word mark is preferred to a logo, and a word mark in the same style of type as surrounding text is preferred to a word mark in its trademarked distinctive type.

== Fair use in different jurisdictions ==
=== China ===
In China, fair use is also permitted for trademarks but the doctrine revolves around the impact on consumers' ability to identify the source of the goods or services. The China Supreme Court's official interpretation of the trademark law directs judges to determine whether a disputed use is "in a manner that is likely to cause confusion" to the public, in which case the use gives rise to civil liability.

== See also ==
- Nominative use
- Rogers v. Grimaldi and the Rogers test
