= Phillips Field =

Phillips Field may refer to:

- Phillips Field (Florida), a demolished football stadium in Tampa, Florida, United States
- Phillips Army Airfield, a military airport in the US state of Maryland
