= Brasseya Allen =

American writer

- Born: c. 1762
- Died: December 29, 1831
- Spouse(s): John Allen

Brasseya Johnson Allen (1762 – December 29, 1831) was a poet who is thought to be the first woman to publish a book of poetry in Maryland.

Allen was a daughter of William Johnson, a landholder in the county of Wicklow, Leinster, Ireland, was born at Temple Lyon, her father's mansion, situated in that county. In 1782 the family moved, it seems, to Arklow, a seaport-town in the same county. She married the Rev. John Allen, a Methodist minister. Her husband had been ordained in Ireland and, in 1795, he took charge of St. George's Church, Harford County, Maryland, in connection with a school. He became, in 1875, a professor in St. John's College, Annapolis, and, in 1821, he held a professorship in the University of Maryland, Baltimore. He died in 1830, at the age of seventy. Brasseya Allen's literary work consists of a volume of poems entitled Pastorals, Elegies, Odes, Epistles, and Other Poems, by Mrs. Allen, printed by Daniel P. Ruff, Abingdon, Maryland, 1806.

This article incorporates text from The poets and verse-writers of Maryland : with selections from their works, by George Corbin Perine, a publication from 1898, now in the public domain in the United States.
