= Harford Transit =

Public transportation service in Maryland, US

Harford Transit LINK
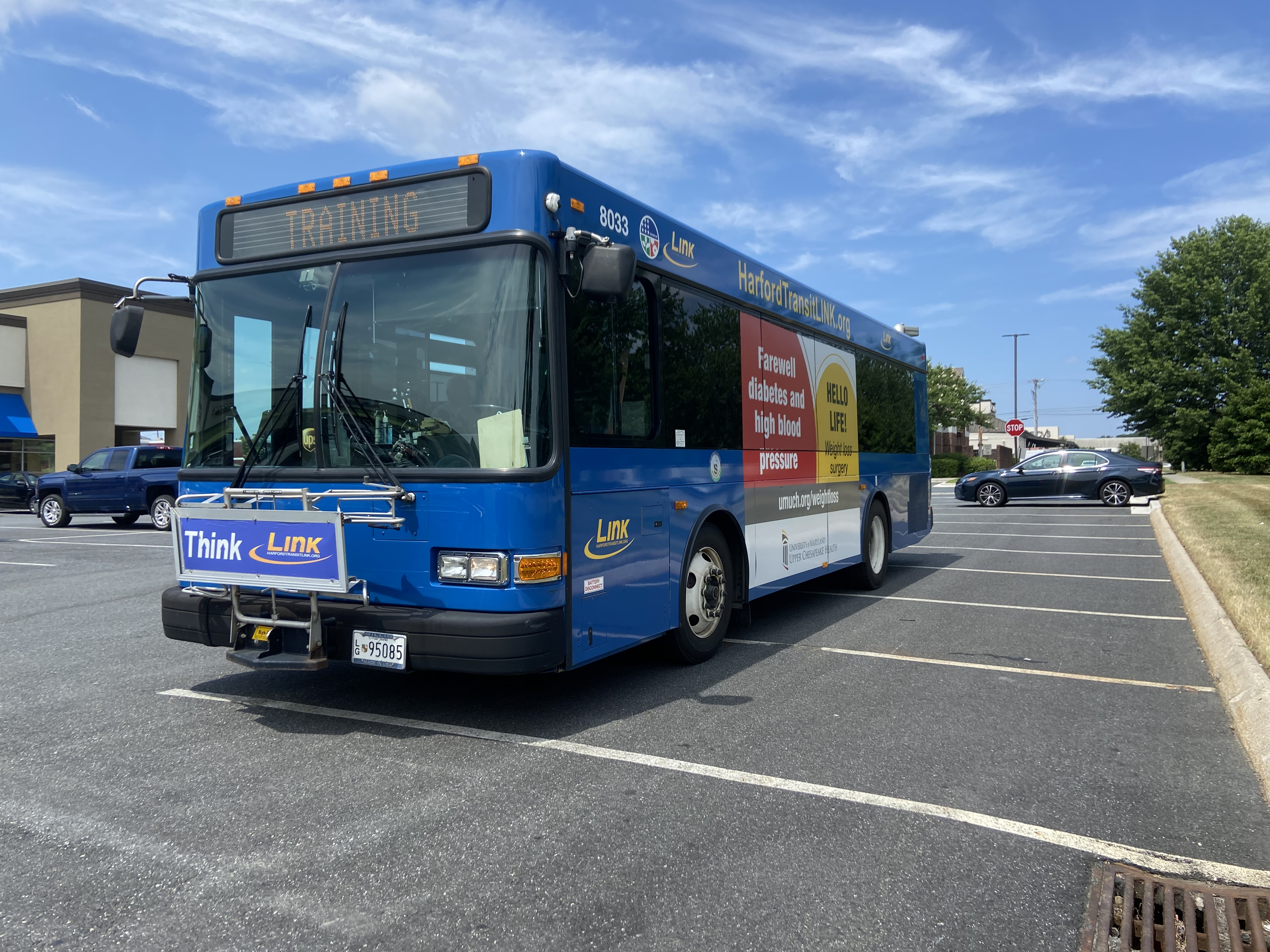
- Gillig Low Floor 29 footer #8033 at Tollgate Mall in Bel Air, Maryland (c. 2020)
- Headquarters: 1311 Abingdon
- Locale: Abingdon, Maryland
- Service area: Harford County, Maryland, Cecil County, Maryland
- Service type: bus service
- Routes: 7
- Hubs: Aberdeen Train Station/Harford Mall
- Website: harfordcountymd.gov/213/Harford-Transit-LINK

Harford Transit, commonly known as Harford Transit LINK, Transit LINK, or simply LINK, is a public transportation service of the Harford County, Maryland Department of Transportation. It provides seven fixed route services in Harford County. The Maryland Transit Administration complements these routes, providing bus access to Baltimore with its commuter lines, or access to Baltimore or Washington via rail.

== Routes ==
Harford Transit LINK operates seven routes Mondays through Fridays, closing on federal holidays and some adjacent days for holiday observances. Lines have various starting and stopping times, but none run overnight. The earliest route begins at 5:07 a.m. with the latest route closing at 8:57 p.m.

Line	Routing
1 (Green)	Havre de Grace–Aberdeen–Bel Air
2 (Blue)	Bel Air–Abingdon–Edgewood
3 (Silver)	Aberdeen–Edgewood–Joppatowne
4 (Yellow)	Aberdeen Circulator
5 (Teal)	Aberdeen–Perryville–Havre de Grace–Perryman
6 (Orange)	Bel Air Circulator
7 (Red)	Aberdeen–Riverside–Edgewood
