= KAPG =

KAPG may refer to:

- KRQA, a radio station (88.1 FM) licensed to Bentonville, Arkansas, United States, which held the call sign KAPG from 1996 to 2016
- Phillips Army Airfield (ICAO code KAPG)
