= Poplar Hill (Aberdeen, Maryland) =

Historic house in Maryland, United States

- U.S. National Register of Historic Places
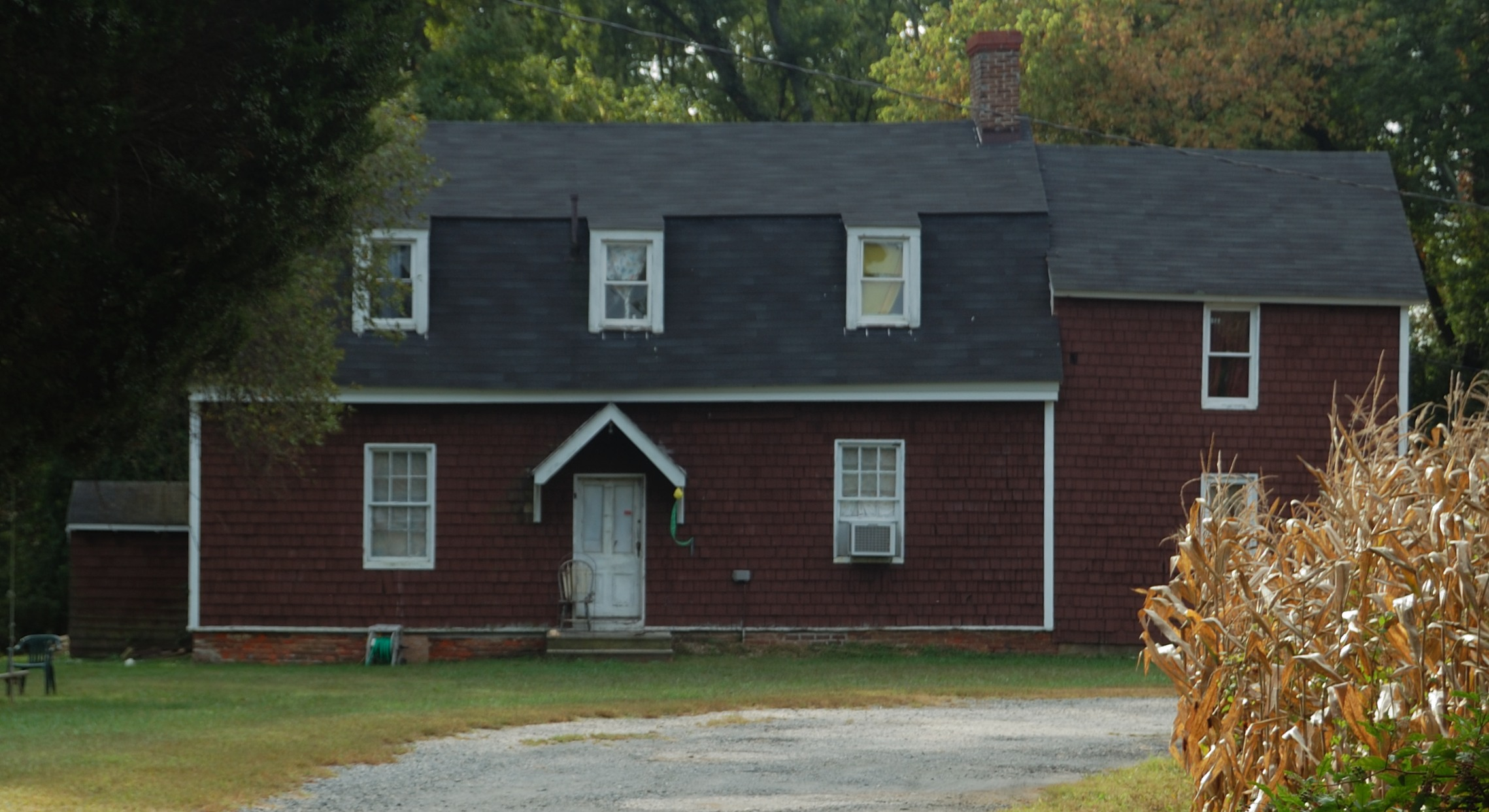
- Poplar Hill in 2013

- Location within Maryland Location within the United States
- Location: 115 Poplar Hill Rd., Aberdeen, Maryland
- Coordinates: 39°29′46″N 76°10′17″W
- Area: 4 acres (1.6 ha)
- Built: 1750
- NRHP reference No.: 76000998
- Added to NRHP: May 28, 1976

Poplar Hill is a historic home located at Aberdeen, Harford County, Maryland. It is a 1 1/2-story, gambrel-roofed frame house, built in the mid-18th century. A late-19th-century one-bay, two-story, gable-roofed wing is attached.

Poplar Hill was listed on the National Register of Historic Places in 1976.
