= List of Playboy Playmates of 1980 =

The following is a list of Playboy Playmates of 1980. Playboy magazine names its Playmate of the Month each month throughout the year.

== January ==
Gig Gangel

Personal details
- Born: October 17, 1958 (age 67) Harlingen, Texas, U.S.
- Height: 5 ft 8 in (1.73 m)

Geraldine "Gig" Gangel (born October 17, 1958, in Harlingen, Texas) is an American model and actress. She was Playboy magazine's Playmate of the Month for its January 1980 issue. Her centerfold was photographed by Ken Marcus.

Before becoming a Playmate, Gangel appeared on the October 1979 cover of Playboy. In The Playmate Book, Gangel commented on her photo shoot with Burt Reynolds that, "I didn't think Burt was my type, until I met him."

== February ==
Sandy Cagle

Personal details
- Born: February 2, 1957 (age 69) Milwaukee, Wisconsin, U.S.
- Height: 5 ft 6 in (1.68 m)

Sandra Joyce Cagle (born February 2, 1957, in Milwaukee, Wisconsin) is an American model. She was Playboy magazine's Playmate of the Month for its February 1980 issue. Her centerfold was photographed by Pompeo Posar. Cagle had a brief stint as a Bunny at the Playboy Resort in Lake Geneva, Wisconsin, before her Playmate selection. She appeared on four covers of the Japanese edition in one year before she became a Playmate.

== March ==
Henriette Allais

Personal details
- Born: July 22, 1954 (age 72) Jacksonville, Florida, U.S.
- Height: 5 ft 8 in (1.73 m)

Henriette Allais (born July 22, 1954, in Jacksonville, Florida) is an American model. She was Playboy magazine's Playmate of the Month for its March 1980 issue. Her centerfold was photographed by Arny Freytag and Richard Fegley. In 1980, she posed for Helmut Newton's "Big Nudes" series. Her portrait "Big Nude III" became the poster for the first exhibition of the series at Galerie Daniel Templon, Paris in 1981. A numbered print of "Big Nude III" was sold at an auction at Christie's in November 2005 for £176,000 ($311,344).

== April ==
Liz Glazowski
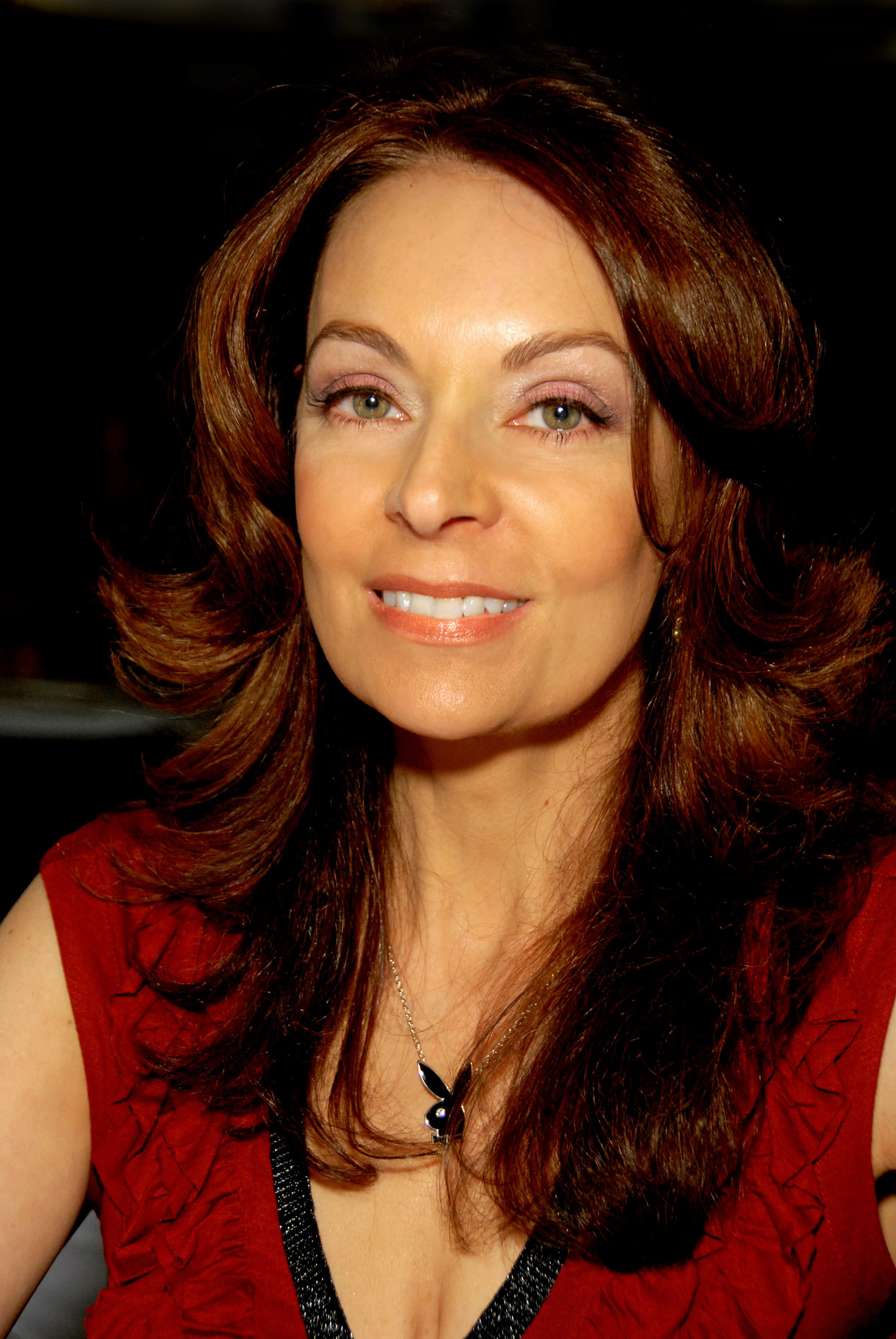
- Liz Glazowski attending Glamourcon No. 50, Long Beach, California on November 13, 2010

Personal details
- Born: December 19, 1957 (age 68) Zakopane, Poland
- Height: 5 ft 5 in (1.65 m)

Liz Glazowski (born December 19, 1957, in Zakopane, Poland) is a Polish-American model. She is best known for being Playboy magazine's Playmate of the Month for its April 1980 issue. Her centerfold was photographed by Ken Marcus.

== May ==
Martha Thomsen

Personal details
- Born: January 25, 1957 (age 69) Moses Lake, Washington, U.S.
- Height: 5 ft 9 in (1.75 m)

Martha Elizabeth Thomsen (born January 25, 1957, in Moses Lake, Washington) is an American model. She was Playboy magazine's Playmate of the Month for its May 1980 issue.

== June ==
Ola Ray

Personal details
- Born: August 26, 1960 (age 66) St. Louis, Missouri, U.S.
- Height: 5 ft 2 in (1.57 m)

Ola Ray (born August 26, 1960) is an American model and actress who starred in the short film "Thriller" in 1983. She modeled for Playboy and was the Playmate of the Month for the June 1980 issue.

== July ==
Teri Peterson

Personal details
- Born: November 6, 1959 (age 66) Santa Monica, California, U.S.
- Height: 5 ft 7 in (1.70 m)

Teri Peterson (born November 6, 1959, in Santa Monica, California) is an American model and actress. She was Playboy magazine's Playmate of the Month for its July 1980 issue.

== August ==
Victoria Cooke

Personal details
- Born: July 31, 1957 (age 69) Hollywood, California, U.S.
- Height: 5 ft 8 in (1.73 m)

Victoria Cooke (born July 31, 1957, in Hollywood, California) is an American model and actress. She was Playboy magazine's Playmate of the Month for its August 1980 issue. Her centerfold was photographed by Mario Casilli.

== September ==
Lisa Welch

Personal details
- Born: November 11, 1960 (age 65) Aberdeen, Maryland, U.S.
- Height: 5 ft 7 in (1.70 m)

Lisa Welch Semler (born on November 11, 1960, in Aberdeen, Maryland) is an American model, actress and artist. She was Playboy magazine's Playmate of the Month for its September 1980 issue. Semler played Suzy, a cheerleader, in Revenge of the Nerds. Semler is married and lives in Malibu, California, and is a painter and photographer. She sells her paintings to greeting card companies. Semler and her husband also maintain their own vineyard and make their own wine.

=== External links ===
- Lisa Welch at IMDb

== October ==
Mardi Jacquet

Personal details
- Born: November 2, 1960 (age 65) Châteauroux, France
- Height: 5 ft 6 in (1.68 m)

Mardi Jacquet (born November 2, 1960, in Châteauroux, France) is a French-American model. She was Playboy magazine's Playmate of the Month for its October 1980 issue.

== November ==
Jeana Tomasino

Personal details
- Born: September 18, 1955 (age 71) Milwaukee, Wisconsin, U.S.
- Height: 5 ft 7 in (1.70 m)

Jeana Tomasino was born on September 18, 1955, in Milwaukee, Wisconsin. Tomasino graduated from Whitnall High School located in Greenfield, Wisconsin, in 1972. When she was younger, she worked as a model and actress. Tomasino was also a Playboy magazine Playmate of the Month in November 1980.

Currently known as Jeana Ellen Keough, Tomasino is a real estate salesperson in Aliso Viejo, California, and a cast member of the reality show The Real Housewives of Orange County.

== December ==
Terri Welles

Playboy Playmate of the Year
- 1981
- Preceded by: Dorothy Stratten
- Succeeded by: Shannon Tweed

Personal details
- Born: November 21, 1956 (age 69) Santa Monica, California, U.S.
- Height: 5 ft 9 in (1.75 m)

Terri Welles (born Terri Knepper November 21, 1956, in Santa Monica, California) is an American actress and model. Welles first appeared on the cover of the May 1980 issue of Playboy. She was the centerfold in the December 1980 issue and named Playmate of the Year for 1981. Her original Playmate pictorial was photographed by Richard Fegley.

Playboy Enterprises sued Welles in 1998 over her online use of its trademark terms "Playboy" and "Playmate of the Year" for commercial purposes. In Playboy Enterprises, Inc. v. Welles, the courts ruled that virtually all of Welles' uses of the terms were allowed.

== See also ==
- List of people in Playboy 1980–1989

Gig Gangel	Sandy Cagle	Henriette Allais	Liz Glazowski	Martha Thomsen	Ola Ray
Teri Peterson	Victoria Cooke	Lisa Welch	Mardi Jacquet	Jeana Keough	Terri Welles
