= The Real Housewives of Orange County season 5 =

Season of television series

The Real Housewives of Orange County
- Season 5
- Cover used by iTunes (Left to right) Bellino, Keough, Rossi, Gunvalson, Curtin, and Barney
- Starring: Vicki Gunvalson; Jeana Keough; Tamra Barney; Lynne Curtin; Gretchen Rossi; Alexis Bellino
- No. of episodes: 17

Release
- Original network: Bravo
- Original release: November 5, 2009 – March 11, 2010

Season chronology
- ← Previous; Season 4 Next → Season 6

The fifth season of The Real Housewives of Orange County, an American reality television series, was broadcast on Bravo. It aired from November 5, 2009 until March 11, 2010, and was primarily filmed in Orange County, California. Its executive producers are Adam Karpel, Alex Baskin, Douglas Ross, Gregory Stewart, Scott Dunlop, Stephanie Boyriven and Andy Cohen.

The Real Housewives of Orange County focuses on the lives of Vicki Gunvalson, Jeana Keough, Tamra Barney, Lynne Curtin, Gretchen Rossi and Alexis Bellino. It consisted of 17 episodes.

This season marked the final regular appearances of Jeana Keough and Lynne Curtin.

== Production and crew ==
In April 2009, The Real Housewives of Orange County was renewed for a fifth season by Bravo. The season premiere "When Times Get Tough, The Tough Go Shopping!" was aired on November 5, 2009, while the fifteenth episode "Is This All There Is?" served as the season finale, and was aired on March 4, 2010. It was followed by a two-part reunion special that aired on March 10 and March 11, 2010, which marked the conclusion of the season. Adam Karpel, Alex Baskin, Douglas Ross, Gregory Stewart, Scott Dunlop, Stephanie Boyriven and Andy Cohen are recognized as the series' executive producers; it is produced and distributed by Evolution Media.

== Cast and synopsis ==
Five of the six housewives featured on the fourth season of The Real Housewives of Orange County initially returned for the fifth instalment. With Peterson's departure midway during season four, it only left five remaining wives. Original housewife Jeana Keough decide to depart from the series on the third episode "It Ends in Coto de Caza" that aired on November 19, 2009. Keough reportedly left the series due to being undervalued saying "I just didn’t feel appreciated by the girls or the network." After the departure of Keough, it made Vicki Gunvalson the only remaining original cast member as of season six. A new housewife was featured on the series to fill Keough's place, Alexis Bellino who is described as a "spicy blonde who unabashedly lives life on her terms." Bellino made her debut to the series on the second episode of the season, and was officially made a full-time cast member in the fourth episode, "It's All About Choices", the episode after Keough's departure.

Gretchen Rossi begins dating after Jeff's death, but still remains in contact with his adult kids. Rossi's new boyfriend leaves the ladies talking due to it being Slade Smiley, a former boyfriend of two previous wives Jo De La Rosa and Lauri Peterson. Away from the feuding and gossip, Rossi debuts her beauty line Gretchen Christine Beaute. Rossi and Barney frequently clash despite an attempted reconciliation. Barney struggles with her husband's dominance and control as the kids begin to witness the tension between the two. Despite attempts to fix the marriage such as getting a tattoo of her husband's name, Barney later asks for a divorce. Barney and Keough, along with their husband suffer from financial difficulties caused by the collapsing economy. After struggling with the collapsing economy, Keough's business is greatly affected. Keough pulls back from the fellow wives to focus on her business. Barney also needing to make more money, jumps back into the real estate game. Lynne Curtin continues her endeavors with her jewelry line. Curtin struggles with being in the middle of Rossi and Barney's drama seeing as she and Barney have grown a lot closer. As she grows closer to Barney a divide begins to form between her and Rossi as she feels Rossi has overstepped her boundaries with her daughter. It's all new for Curtin as she settles into her new home in Laguna Beach and gets a face-lift, however Lynne continues to struggle with disciplining her daughters. Curtin's happiness doesn't last long as she receives an eviction notice, which leaves her questing her trust in her husband. Gunvalson continues to balance her professional career and her personal life. Gunvalson attempts to repair her relationship with her husband Donn, they renew their vows. Bellino and her husband Jim raises their toddler-aged twin girls, Melania and Mackenna, and their son, James with the same Christian values they both hold dear. The other ladies question Bellino's' marriage and just how reliant she is on her husband, which leaves Bellino and Gunvalson feuding and drives Gunvalson to seek support from, now former wife, Keough.

== Episodes ==
The Real Housewives of Orange County season 5 episodes
No. overall	No. in season	Title	Original release date
46	1	"When Times Get Tough, The Tough Go Shopping!"	November 5, 2009
Everyone is on edge as the ladies come together to support Lynne's private jewelry show. Though both Tamra and Gretchen vow to get along, it doesn't take long for the name-calling and insult-hurling to get underway.
47	2	"Friends, Enemies and Husbands"	November 12, 2009
Lynne's showing comes to a halt. A fight between Tamra and Gretchen forces the women to choose sides.
48	3	"It Ends in Coto de Caza"	November 19, 2009
Jeana makes the gut-wrenching decision to pull back from spending so much time with the Housewives in order to concentrate more on her real estate business, which is struggling in a sagging economy. Alexis Bellino joins the cast of the Housewives.
49	4	"It's All About Choices"	December 3, 2009
Briana recovers from her breakup. Simon and Tamra attend a barbecue at the Gunvalsons'. Gretchen flies to Michigan. Lynne settles into her new home.
50	5	"Friends, Facelifts and Florida"	December 10, 2009
Vicki schemes to surprise Donn for their anniversary. Alexis brings the twins for a mani/pedi. Lynne undergoes a face-lift. Tamra shows her first house in several years.
51	6	"All Girls Weekend"	December 17, 2009
Vicki invites the housewives to a weekend in Florida, but there is tension when Alexis and Tamra invite Jim and Simon. Slade surprises Gretchen by arriving, causing Vicki to alienate herself from the group.
52	7	"Love and War"	January 7, 2010
Vicki has a romantic surprise for Donn. Alexis prepares her children for church. Tamra considers letting Gretchen into her life. Lynne allows Gretchen to take Alexa shopping.
53	8	"Let Bygones, Be Bygones"	January 14, 2010
Lynne confronts Gretchen about overstepping her boundaries with Alexa. Vicki invites all of the housewives to a "girls only" slumber party at her house. Vicki invites a psychic to do readings, and Tamra seeks guidance on her relationship with Ryan. The housewives decide to TP Jeana's house.
54	9	"No Boundaries"	January 21, 2010
Alexis and Tamra grow closer. Gretchen and Slade go to the races with Alexis and Jim. One of Gretchen's friends flirts with Alexis' husband, Jim. Lynne and Frank have trouble with Alexa going out too much.
55	10	"I Can't Stop"	January 28, 2010
Marriage woes impact the Barneys and their children. Meanwhile, Gretchen anticipates the premiere of her makeup line. Lynne seeks advice from her mother about her daughters, and Alexis decides to host a cooking party where Gretchen criticizes Lynne's parenting, causing Lynne to break.
56	11	"Nothing Is As It Seems"	February 4, 2010
Tamra gets Simon's name tattooed on her finger. Alexis and Jim go on a mini-getaway. Lynne hosts a dinner party where Vicki finds herself Simon's target.
57	12	"You Can Dish It, But You Can't Take It"	February 11, 2010
Lynne receives an eviction notice. Vicki gets bad news about her daughter's health. Alexis and Gretchen meet for dinner. The girls go on a weekend getaway to San Francisco.
58	13	"Let's Bow Our Heads and Pray"	February 18, 2010
Lynne and her family deal with eviction drama, Gretchen and Slade have a weekend getaway with her parents.
59	14	"This Is How We Do It in the O.C."	February 25, 2010
Vicki reunites with Jeana, Alexis takes her Midwest mom to the plastic surgeon, Lynne and Frank discuss their marriage, and Tamra celebrates her birthday.
60	15	"Is This All There Is?"	March 4, 2010
The housewives prepare to attend the season finale party. Vicki, still hurt by the San Francisco trip, vows to stay clear of drama. Gretchen and Slade color-coordinate outfits, looking (according to Vicki) like the plastic toppers on a wedding cake. Lynn's daughters arrive at the party obviously under the influence, and Lynn excuses herself for not knowing, stating that the limo was big, and she didn't know what her daughters were up to. Tamra and Simon have a heated argument in the limo on the way to the party, with Tamra stating that she wants a divorce. The show ends with a recap of each housewife as is the tradition, and the last summary is that Tamra and Simon are divorcing.
61	16	"Reunion Special: Part 1"	March 10, 2010
The O.C. housewives come together with Andy Cohen, to discuss the past events that occurred during season five.
62	17	"Reunion Special: Part 2"	March 11, 2010
In the conclusion of a reunion episode, the reconvened Orange County wives recall the good, bad, and ugly of season five.
