= Sophia's Dairy =

Historic house in Maryland, United States

- U.S. National Register of Historic Places
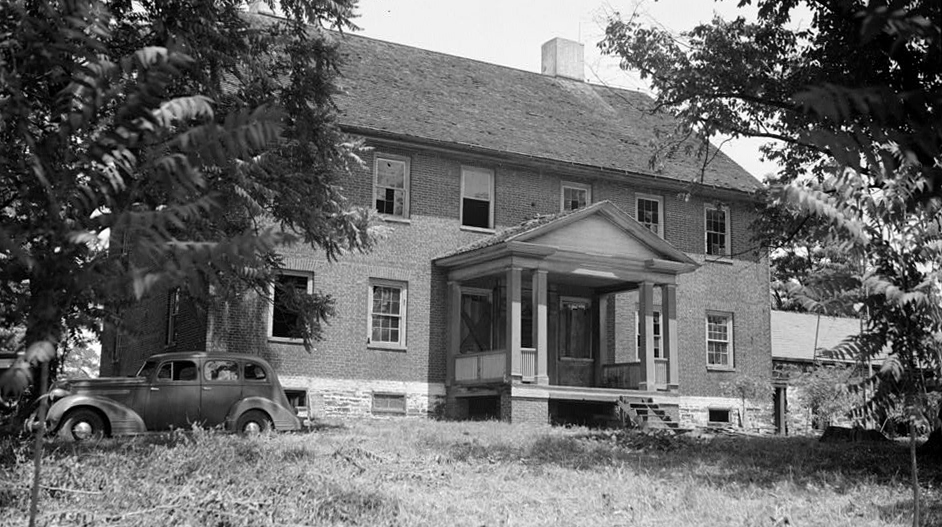
- Sophia's Dairy in 1936

- Location within Maryland Location within the United States
- Location: Riverside Way, Aberdeen, Maryland
- Coordinates: 39°28′24″N 76°14′3″W
- Area: 16 acres (6.5 ha)
- Built: 1768
- Architectural style: Georgian
- NRHP reference No.: 73000922
- Added to NRHP: September 20, 1973

Sophia's Dairy is a historic home in Aberdeen, Harford County, Maryland, United States. It is a large center-hall brick house, 64 by 45 feet (20 by 14 m), with a low stone wing, built in 1768 in the Georgian style. The interior features a double stair which extends upward on the west wall from both ends of the hall. It continues east in one short flight, then separates and parallels the lower flight to the second story hall.

Sophia's Dairy was listed on the National Register of Historic Places in 1973.
