= Terri Welles =

American actress and adult model (born 1956)

- Born: Terri Knepper; November 21, 1956 (age 69); Santa Monica, California, U.S.
- Occupations: Model, actress
- Spouse: Charlie Simmer (m. 1981–1986)

Playboy centerfold appearance
- December 1980
- Preceded by: Jeana Tomasino
- Succeeded by: Karen Price

Playboy Playmate of the Year
- 1981
- Preceded by: Dorothy Stratten
- Succeeded by: Shannon Tweed

Personal details
- Height: 5 ft 9 in (1.75 m)

Terri Welles (born Terri Knepper; November 21, 1956) is an American actress and adult model. She first appeared on the cover of the May 1980 issue of Playboy, wearing a flight attendant costume to illustrate a pictorial on stewardesses (she was a United Airlines stewardess at the time). She subsequently appeared as a centerfold in the December 1980 issue and was named Playmate of the Year for 1981. Her original pictorial was photographed by Richard Fegley. Welles was the inspiration for the "Bobo Weller" character in the film Star 80.

== Career ==
In 1997, Welles started an online business selling pictures of herself. On her website she described herself as a former Playboy model and Playmate of the Year. Playboy Enterprises, which was starting up its own online business at this time, sued Welles in 1998, claiming that it had the exclusive right to use of its trademark terms "Playboy" and "Playmate of the Year" for commercial purposes. The outcome of the suit, Playboy Enterprises, Inc. v. Welles, was that virtually all of Welles' use of the terms were considered nominative uses, and did not infringe on Playboy's rights.

Welles closed down her website on October 31, 2006, with the announcement that it had "been a fun ride".

== Personal life ==
Welles was born in Santa Monica, California.

She married NHL ice hockey player, Charlie Simmer, in 1981; they had a daughter and divorced in 1986.

== See also ==
- List of people in Playboy 1980–1989

Gig Gangel	Sandy Cagle	Henriette Allais	Liz Glazowski	Martha Thomsen	Ola Ray
Teri Peterson	Victoria Cooke	Lisa Welch	Mardi Jacquet	Jeana Keough	Terri Welles
