= Swansbury =

Historic house in Maryland, United States

- U.S. National Register of Historic Places
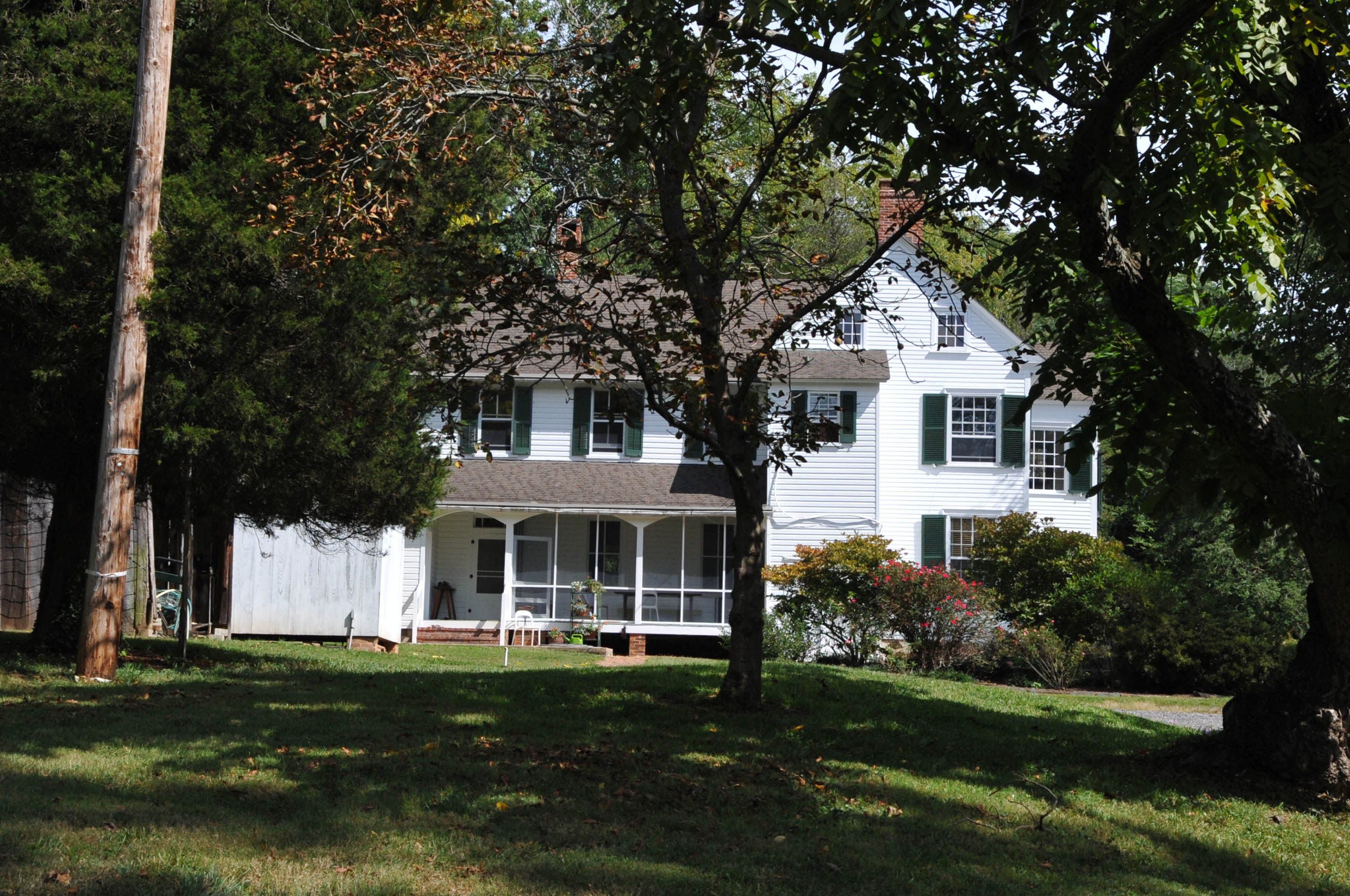
- Swansbury in 2008

- Location within Maryland Location within the United States
- Location: 111 Beards Hill Road, Aberdeen, Maryland
- Coordinates: 39°31′18″N 76°9′11″W
- Area: 87 acres (35 ha)
- Built: 1775
- Architectural style: Federal
- NRHP reference No.: 94000730
- Added to NRHP: July 15, 1994

Swansbury is a historic home and complex located at Aberdeen, Harford County, Maryland, United States. The buildings are clustered together near the center of the 86.78-acre (351,200 m^{2}) forested property. The complex consists of a five-bay, two-story, multi-part, frame residence and several period frame dependencies. The oldest part of the house dates to about 1760, with major Federal style additions made in the late 18th or every early 19th century. Also on the property are an array of eleven frame outbuildings (barns, wash house, poultry houses, meathouse, etc.) which seem to date from the early 19th century. The grounds are dotted with ancient exotic specimen trees and shrubs.

Swansbury was listed on the National Register of Historic Places in 1994.
