= Chestnut Ridge (Aberdeen, Maryland) =

Historic house in Maryland, US

- U.S. National Register of Historic Places
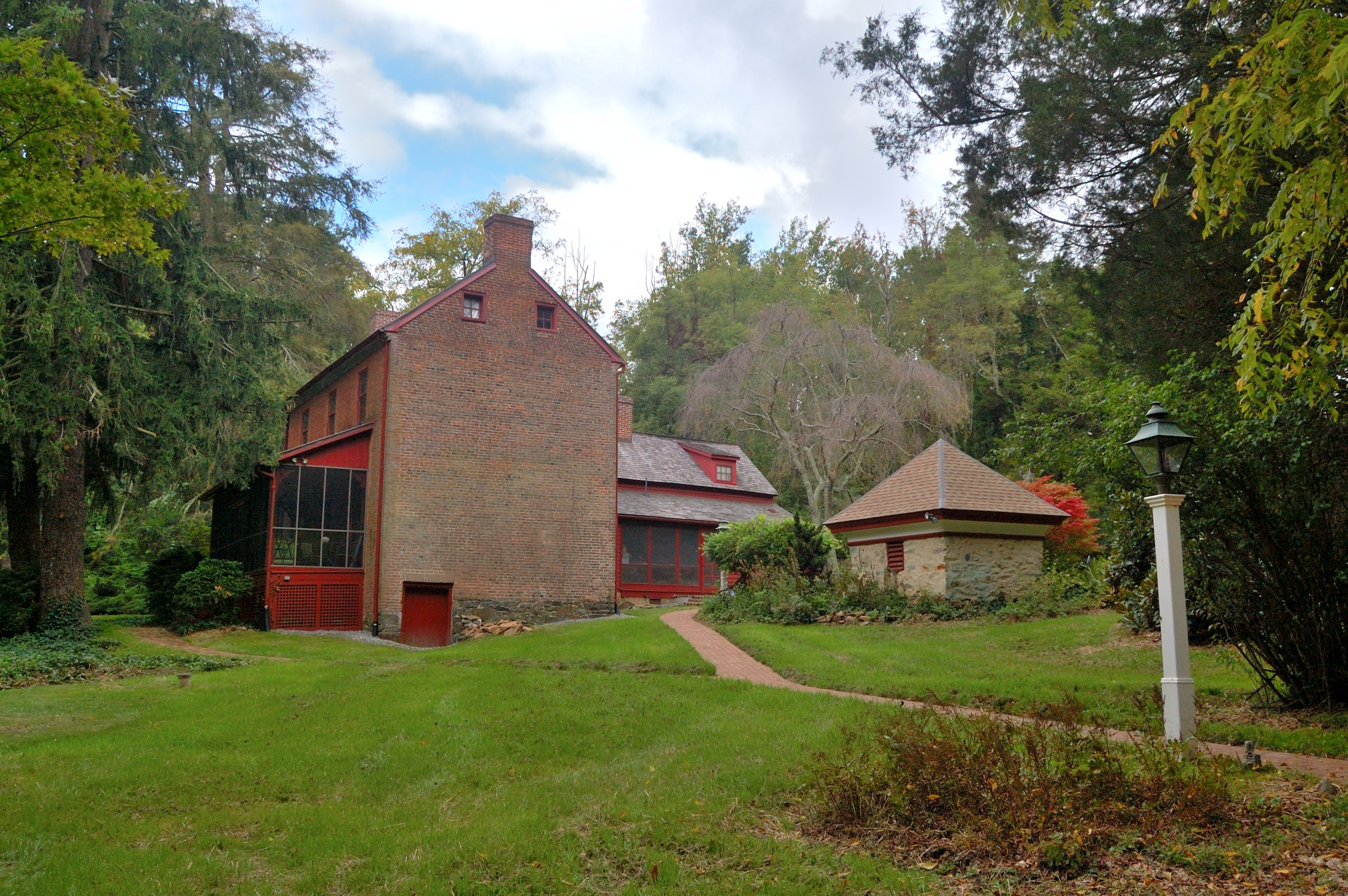
- Chestnut Ridge, September 2013

- Location within Maryland Location within the United States
- Location: 3850 W. Chapel Rd., Aberdeen, Maryland
- Coordinates: 39°33′34″N 76°10′53″W
- Area: 2 acres (0.81 ha)
- Built: c.1810; 216 years ago
- Built by: Hoopman, Christian
- Architectural style: Federal
- NRHP reference No.: 83003780
- Added to NRHP: December 1, 1983

Chestnut Ridge is a historic home located at Aberdeen, Harford County, Maryland. It is a two-story brick dwelling built about 1810, with an earlier frame wing. It features vernacular Federal woodwork which remains substantially intact, and Greek Revival trim. The property also includes a stone springhouse and the site of an 18th-century mill.

It was listed on the National Register of Historic Places in 1983.
