= Aberdeen, Maryland =

- City
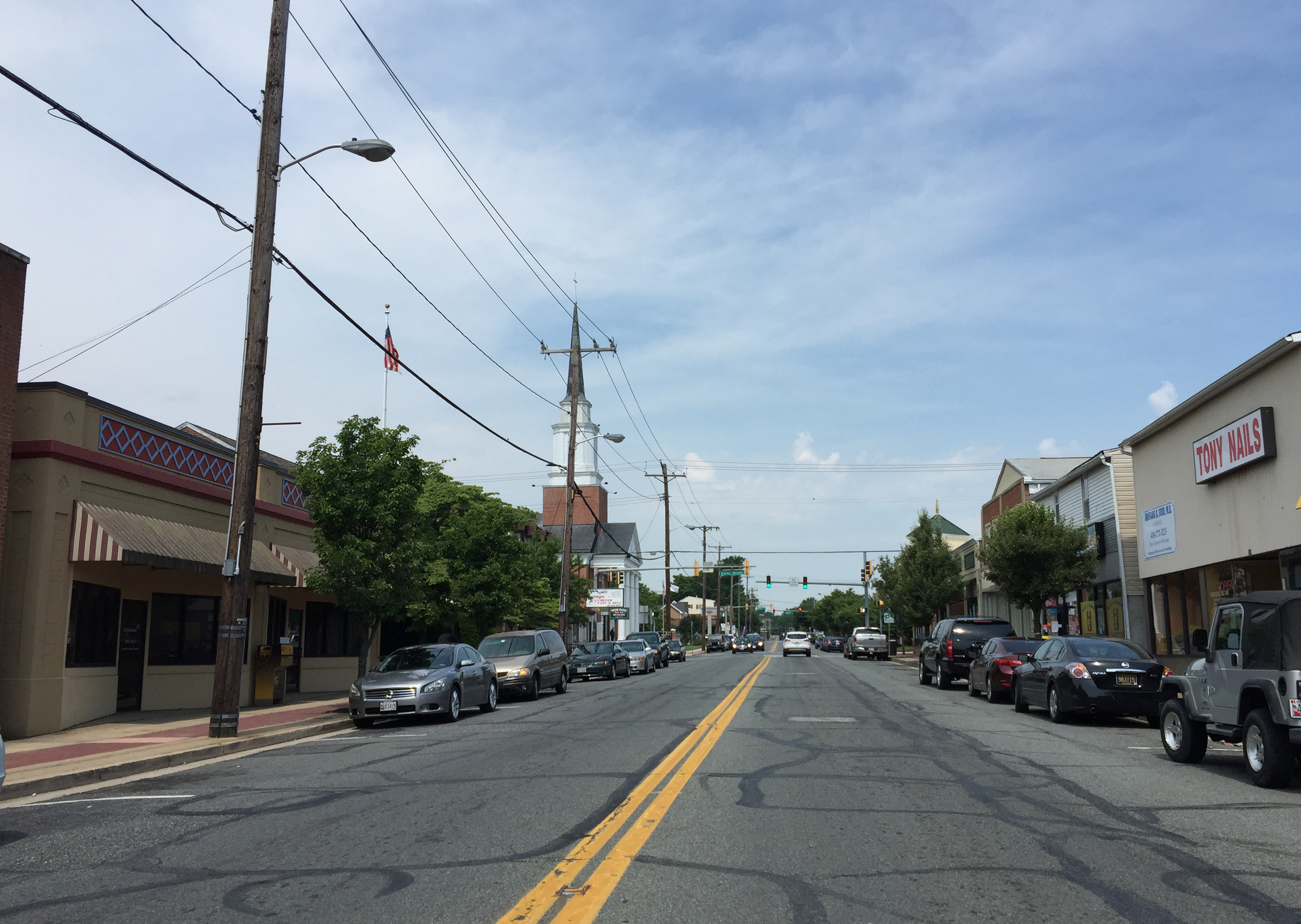
- Bel Air Avenue in downtown Aberdeen, 2016

- Flag Seal
- Nickname: "All America City"
- Motto: "The Future of Harford!"
- Location in Harford County, Maryland

- Location within Maryland Location within the United States Location within North America
- Coordinates: 39°30′37″N 76°10′9″W
- Country: United States
- State: Maryland
- County: Harford
- Incorporated: 1892

Government
  - Mayor: Patrick McGrady

Area
  - Total: 6.60 sq mi (17.10 km^{2})
  - Land: 6.59 sq mi (17.08 km^{2})
  - Water: 0.0077 sq mi (0.02 km^{2})
- Elevation: 95 ft (29 m)

Population (2020)
  - Total: 16,254
  - Density: 2,464.7/sq mi (951.62/km^{2})
- Time zone: UTC−5 (Eastern)
  - Summer (DST): UTC−4 (Eastern)
- ZIP code: 21001
- Area code: 410
- FIPS code: 24-00125
- GNIS feature ID: 0582854
- Website: www.aberdeenmd.gov

Aberdeen is a city in Harford County, Maryland, United States, 26 miles (42 km) northeast of Baltimore. The population was 16,254 at the 2020 United States census. Aberdeen is the largest municipality in Harford County.

Aberdeen is part of the Baltimore-Towson Metropolitan Statistical Area (MSA), which is the 20th-largest United States metropolitan area. The nearest city to Aberdeen is Havre de Grace, 4.8 miles (7.7 km) to the northeast.

== History ==
Aberdeen was named after Aberdeen, Scotland, by immigrating Scots.

The James B. Baker House, Chestnut Ridge, Griffith House, Poplar Hill, Sophia's Dairy, and Swansbury are listed on the National Register of Historic Places.

=== Early settlements ===
Aberdeen began as a farming community in 1720, when Charles Calvert, the fifth Lord Baltimore, granted 1,140 acres of fertile land to Edward Hall. Located on the western edge of the Chesapeake on the main road between Alexandria and Philadelphia called the Old Post Road, the village at Halls Cross Road remained small until the Philadelphia, Wilmington and Baltimore Railroad scouted the area for a watering station in 1835. One of the railroad companies engineers was Edmund Law Rogers who saw the great potential in the place for development.

=== Village of Aberdeen ===
The Village of Aberdeen was a development by Edmund Law Rogers around 1800. The name originated from its mother city, Aberdeen, Scotland, as a result of the close relationship the Rogers family of Baltimore had with their cousin, the Earl of Aberdeen, who became Prime Minister of Great Britain in 1852. The area now known as Aberdeen is a cluster of three communities

- Hall's Cross Roads, located at the intersection of Old Philadelphia Road (MD-7, in some places known as Old Post Road, then known as Philadelphia Post Road) and Bush River Neck Road (then the main road from Swan Creek 39°31′28.41″N 76°8′17.75″W)
- Mechanicsville, located at 39°36′7.3836″N 76°19′10.8516″W
- The Village of Aberdeen

=== As a town ===
In 1892, Aberdeen was incorporated as a town, under Chapter 136 of the Acts of 1892.

==== Board of commissioners ====
Upon incorporation as a town, the Aberdeen government was led by a board of commissioners.

- From 1892 to 1905, a board president was elected annually by the commissioners.
- From 1906 to 1954, this election was changed to be biennial.
- From 1955 to 1992, the election of a board president was changed back to be annual.

In 1992, the Town of Aberdeen revised its charter and became the City of Aberdeen with an elected mayor. The first mayor of the City of Aberdeen was Ruth Elliot. The second mayor was Doug Wilson, and Fred Simmons was elected mayor in 2005. Michael Bennett served as mayor from 2007 to 2015. In 2015, Patrick McGrady was elected mayor of Aberdeen and is currently serving a four-year term.

=== As a city ===
In 1992, Aberdeen was incorporated as a city.

=== 2018 shooting ===
On September 20, 2018, 26-year-old Snochia Moseley opened fire at a Rite Aid warehouse where he temporarily worked. He killed three people and injured three others before turning the gun on himself.

== Geography ==
According to the United States Census Bureau, the city has a total area of 6.81 square miles (17.64 km^{2}), of which, 6.80 square miles (17.61 km^{2}) is land and 0.01 square miles (0.03 km^{2}) is water.

The city of Aberdeen is located at the north end of Upper Chesapeake Bay.

== Climate ==
The climate in this area is characterized by hot, humid summers and generally mild to cool winters. According to the Köppen Climate Classification system, Aberdeen has a humid subtropical climate, abbreviated "Cfa" on climate maps.

Climate data for Phillips Army Airfield (1991–2020 normals, extremes 1919–1957, 1966–present)
Month	Jan	Feb	Mar	Apr	May	Jun	Jul	Aug	Sep	Oct	Nov	Dec	Year
Record high °F (°C)	75 (24)	81 (27)	88 (31)	94 (34)	97 (36)	100 (38)	105 (41)	102 (39)	98 (37)	95 (35)	85 (29)	74 (23)	105 (41)
Mean daily maximum °F (°C)	41.5 (5.3)	44.1 (6.7)	52.5 (11.4)	64.8 (18.2)	73.2 (22.9)	82.1 (27.8)	86.4 (30.2)	84.4 (29.1)	78.2 (25.7)	66.9 (19.4)	55.5 (13.1)	45.8 (7.7)	64.6 (18.1)
Daily mean °F (°C)	33.4 (0.8)	35.6 (2.0)	42.8 (6.0)	54.0 (12.2)	62.9 (17.2)	72.2 (22.3)	77.1 (25.1)	75.1 (23.9)	68.5 (20.3)	56.7 (13.7)	46.1 (7.8)	38.0 (3.3)	55.2 (12.9)
Mean daily minimum °F (°C)	25.3 (−3.7)	27.1 (−2.7)	33.1 (0.6)	43.2 (6.2)	52.7 (11.5)	62.4 (16.9)	67.7 (19.8)	65.8 (18.8)	58.8 (14.9)	46.5 (8.1)	36.8 (2.7)	30.2 (−1.0)	45.8 (7.7)
Record low °F (°C)	−12 (−24)	−13 (−25)	3 (−16)	13 (−11)	31 (−1)	40 (4)	48 (9)	48 (9)	34 (1)	21 (−6)	8 (−13)	0 (−18)	−13 (−25)
Average precipitation inches (mm)	3.26 (83)	2.78 (71)	4.10 (104)	3.49 (89)	3.98 (101)	4.28 (109)	4.84 (123)	4.21 (107)	4.84 (123)	4.17 (106)	3.27 (83)	3.89 (99)	47.11 (1,197)
Source: NOAA

== Attractions ==
=== B.&.O. Railroad Station ===
The B.&.O. Aberdeen Station is a historic train station in downtown Aberdeen. Designed by Frank Furness and built in 1885 by the Baltimore and Ohio Railroad, the station was saved from planned demolition in 2003 and relocated about 50 feet (15 m) from its original site in 2015. A $1.1 million restoration project began in 2021, and restoration of the exterior was completed in July 2024.

=== Ripken Stadium ===
Ripken Stadium is the home of the Aberdeen IronBirds, located on Maryland Route 22, and named after former Baltimore Orioles star player Cal Ripken. Across the street is the Ripken Experience, a baseball complex with ten youth fields for tournaments, camps and clinics. The fields are scaled replicas of current and former MLB stadiums.

=== Aberdeen Festival Park ===
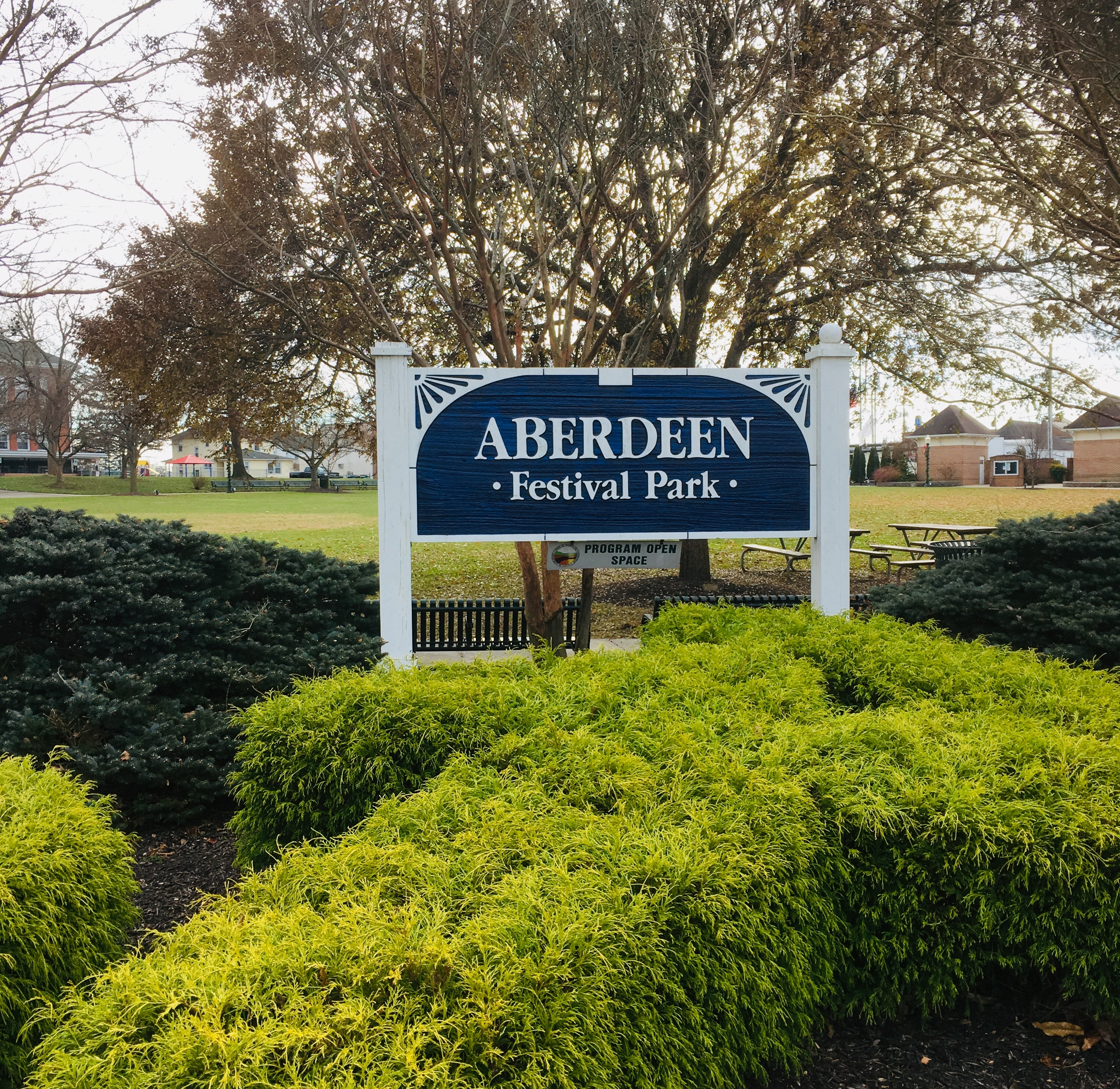

Aberdeen Festival Park is located in the heart of downtown on North Parke Street in Aberdeen. It is home to many city events such as the Aberdeen Farmers Market. It includes an outside field, a playground, and the APG Memorial.

=== Victory Street Park ===
Victory Street Park on Victory St. features a playground, basketball court, disc-golf, and a dog park.

== Demographics ==
Historical population
Census	Pop.	Note	%±
1880	101		—
1890	448		343.6%
1900	600		33.9%
1910	616		2.7%
1920	1,067		73.2%
1930	1,240		16.2%
1940	1,525		23.0%
1950	2,944		93.0%
1960	9,679		228.8%
1970	12,375		27.9%
1980	11,533		−6.8%
1990	13,087		13.5%
2000	13,842		5.8%
2010	14,959		8.1%
2020	16,254		8.7%
U.S. Decennial Census

=== 2020 census ===
As of the 2020 census, Aberdeen had a population of 16,254. The median age was 37.8 years. 22.8% of residents were under the age of 18 and 15.7% of residents were 65 years of age or older. For every 100 females there were 91.6 males, and for every 100 females age 18 and over there were 89.1 males age 18 and over.

99.5% of residents lived in urban areas, while 0.5% lived in rural areas.

There were 6,473 households in Aberdeen, of which 30.9% had children under the age of 18 living in them. Of all households, 38.4% were married-couple households, 19.6% were households with a male householder and no spouse or partner present, and 33.2% were households with a female householder and no spouse or partner present. About 29.6% of all households were made up of individuals and 12.2% had someone living alone who was 65 years of age or older.

There were 6,936 housing units, of which 6.7% were vacant. The homeowner vacancy rate was 2.5% and the rental vacancy rate was 6.8%.

Racial composition as of the 2020 census
Race	Number	Percent
White	8,342	51.3%
Black or African American	5,013	30.8%
American Indian and Alaska Native	75	0.5%
Asian	493	3.0%
Native Hawaiian and Other Pacific Islander	37	0.2%
Some other race	672	4.1%
Two or more races	1,622	10.0%
Hispanic or Latino (of any race)	1,540	9.5%

=== 2010 census ===
As of the census of 2010, there were 14,959 people, 5,801 households, and 3,897 families residing in the city. The population density was 2,199.9 inhabitants per square mile (849.4/km^{2}). There were 6,191 housing units at an average density of 910.4 per square mile (351.5/km^{2}). The racial makeup of the city was 58.9% White, 30.5% African American, 0.4% Native American, 2.9% Asian, 0.3% Pacific Islander, 1.6% from other races, and 5.3% from two or more races. Hispanic or Latino people of any race were 5.4% of the population.

There were 5,801 households, of which 34.3% had children under the age of 18 living with them, 43.5% were married couples living together, 18.3% had a female householder with no husband present, 5.4% had a male householder with no wife present, and 32.8% were non-families. 26.7% of all households were made up of individuals, and 10.8% had someone living alone who was 65 years of age or older. The average household size was 2.57 and the average family size was 3.09.

The median age in the city was 38 years. 24.7% of residents were under the age of 18; 9.2% were between the ages of 18 and 24; 24.9% were from 25 to 44; 28.6% were from 45 to 64; and 12.6% were 65 years of age or older. The gender makeup of the city was 47.8% male and 52.2% female.

=== 2000 census ===
As of the census of 2000, there were 13,842 people, 5,475 households, and 3,712 families residing in the city. The population density was 2,166.2 inhabitants per square mile (836.4/km^{2}). There were 5,894 housing units at an average density of 922.4 per square mile (356.1/km^{2}). The racial makeup of the city was 64.90% White, 27.38% African American, 0.25% Native American, 2.48% Asian, 0.09% Pacific Islander, 1.42% from other races, and 3.47% from two or more races. Hispanic or Latino people of any race were 3.45% of the population.

There were 5,475 households, out of which 32.4% had children under the age of 18 living with them, 44.8% were married couples living together, 17.2% had a female householder with no husband present, and 32.2% were non-families. 26.8% of all households were made up of individuals, and 10.7% had someone living alone who was 65 years of age or older. The average household size was 2.51 and the average family size was 3.02.

In the city, the population was spread out, with 26.4% under the age of 18, 8.7% from 18 to 24, 28.6% from 25 to 44, 23.7% from 45 to 64, and 12.7% who were 65 years of age or older. The median age was 37 years. For every 100 females, there were 90.6 males. For every 100 females age 18 and over, there were 85.8 males.

The median income for a household in the city was $39,190, and the median income for a family was $48,357. Males had a median income of $32,783 versus $26,025 for females. The per capita income for the city was $18,940. About 9.0% of families and 11.9% of the population were below the poverty line, including 15.9% of those under age 18 and 11.1% of those age 65 or over.

== Transportation ==
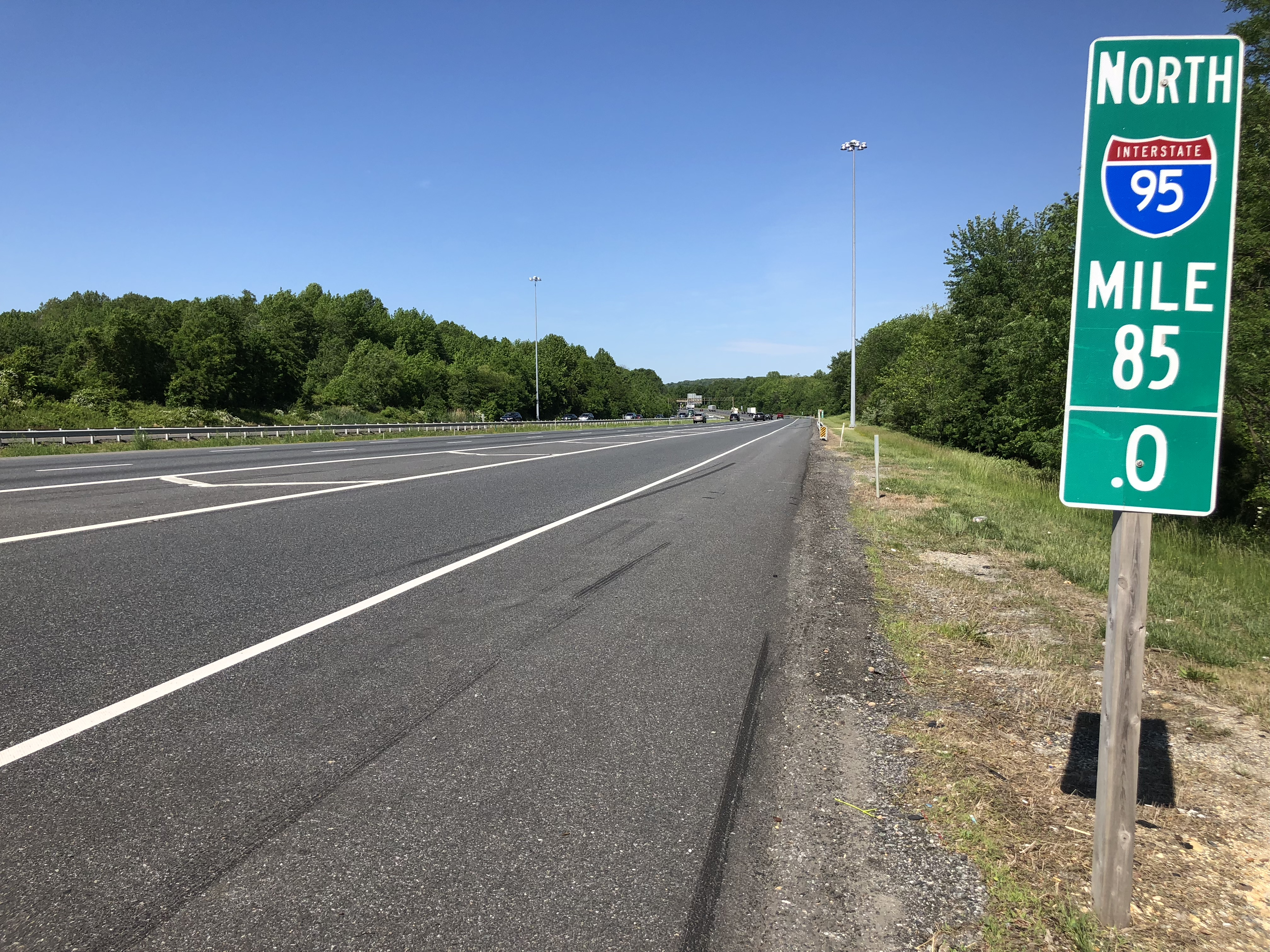
I-95 northbound in Aberdeen

=== Roads and highways ===
Several major highways serve Aberdeen, with the most prominent of these being Interstate 95. I-95 briefly crosses the northwestern corner of Aberdeen and provides access to many major cities, including Baltimore, Philadelphia, Washington, D.C. and New York City. Access to Aberdeen is provided via an interchange with Maryland Route 22, which also connects directly to the Aberdeen Proving Grounds as well as to Bel Air, the county seat. U.S. Route 40 also serves the city, running parallel to I-95 from Baltimore to Wilmington and serving as an alternate route. Other state highways serving Aberdeen include Maryland Route 7, Maryland Route 132, Maryland Route 159, Maryland Route 462 and Maryland Route 715.

=== Rail transport ===
The city of Aberdeen is located on the old Philadelphia, Wilmington and Baltimore Railroad which is now operated by CSX. The new Aberdeen station is located on Amtrak's Northeast Corridor main line is served by Amtrak Northeast Regional, Maryland Area Regional Commuter (MARC) Penn Line trains and local buses. Located just south of the East Coast Greenway, the city has access to a walking and biking trail network linking the major cities along the U.S. east coast.

=== Local transportation ===
The city of Aberdeen is part of the Harford Transit LINK public bus system. Routes 1 (Green Line), 2 (Blue Line), 3 (Silver Line) and 5 (Teal Line) connect Aberdeen with Havre de Grace, Bel Air, Edgewood, Joppatowne and Perryville. Route 4 (Yellow Line) is the Aberdeen Circulator which services the different neighborhoods within the city of Aberdeen.

== Government ==
Since its incorporation as a city, Aberdeen has had a council-manager form of government. The mayor and council are elected to four-year terms in November, with terms beginning in November. The mayor and council define policy and appoint the city manager, who may be dismissed at any time, by vote of the council. The city manager, with the approval of the council, appoints all officers and department heads, who may be dismissed for cause by action of the city manager.

Presidential election results in Aberdeen
Year	Democratic	Republican	Others
2020	58.9% 4,337	38.2% 2,812	2.9% 213
2016	57.0% 4,080	37.5% 2,683	5.5% 392

=== Mayors of Aberdeen ===
- Ruth Elliott, 1992–1994
- Charles R. Boutin, 1994–1998
- Douglas S. Wilson, 1998–2005
- S. Fred Simmons, 2005–2007
- Michael E. Bennett, 2007–2015
- Patrick McGrady, 2015–present

=== Aberdeen City Council ===
The city council and mayor are elected by voters to four-year terms beginning in November 2011. Councilmember terms are staggered, with current terms ending in 2027 and 2029.

- Patrick McGrady, Mayor (2027)
- Adam Hiob, Council President (2027)
- Bill Montgomery, Councilman (2029)
- Tandra Ridgley, Councilwoman (2027)
- Darin Wassum, Councilman (2029)

=== Harford County Council ===
Council District E

- Jessica Boyle-Tsottles (Republican)

=== Maryland General Assembly ===
State Senate, District 34

- State Senator Mary-Dulany James (Democrat)

House of Delegates, District 34A

- Andre Johnson Jr (Democrat)
- Steve Johnson(Democrat)

=== Congressional Delegation ===
US Senate

- Senator Angela Alsobrooks(Democrat)
- Senator Chris Van Hollen (Democrat)

US House of Representatives, 1st Congressional District

- Congressman Andy Harris (Republican)

== Aberdeen Proving Ground ==
Aberdeen is home to the U.S. Army's Aberdeen Proving Ground (APG). The proving ground was established by Act of Congress and came into operation in January 1918. APG is headquarters of the United States Army Test and Evaluation Command (ATEC). The proving ground occupies more than 72,500 acres (293 km^{2}) in Harford County. More than 7,500 civilians and 5,000 military personnel work at APG.

== Notable people and groups ==
- William Benjamin Baker, U.S. congressman for Maryland's 2nd District, 1895–1901
- Linwood Clark, U.S. congressman for Maryland's 2nd District, 1929–1931; born in Aberdeen on March 21, 1876
- Ballyhoo!, reggae rock band
- Les German, Major League Baseball pitcher, trap-shooter
- David Grace, UCLA and Oregon State University basketball coach (USAF retired)
- Michael D. Griffin, head administrator of NASA
- E. J. Henderson, Minnesota Vikings football player, former Maryland Terrapin
- Erin Henderson, Minnesota Vikings football player, former Maryland Terrapin
- Jai Lewis, college basketball player (George Mason Patriots)
- Moor Mother, musician, poet, activist
- Gary Neal, NBA player for Washington Wizards
- Irv Pankey, Aberdeen High School, 2-time wrestling state champion (1975–1976); Penn State offensive lineman (1976–1980); NFL: Los Angeles Rams (1980–1990) Indianapolis Colts (1991–1992)
- Cal Ripken Sr., longtime coach and manager in the Baltimore Orioles organization; father of Cal Ripken Jr. and Billy Ripken
- Billy Ripken, infielder for Baltimore Orioles and brother of Cal Ripken Jr.
- Cal Ripken Jr., baseball Hall of Famer and Baltimore Orioles legend; grew up in Aberdeen and was a student at Aberdeen High School
- Richard Slutzky, "Coach Slutzky", honoree of National Wrestling Hall of Fame, longtime Aberdeen High School coach
- Lisa Welch, model, Playboy Playmate of the Month, September 1980
- Steven M. Wise, animal rights lawyer and scholar, inducted into Aberdeen High School Hall of Fame
- Frank Zappa, musician, lived in Aberdeen for a short period, father worked at APG

== Aberdeen IronBirds ==
Cal Ripken Jr. and brother Billy are owners of the Aberdeen IronBirds minor league baseball team, which plays at Ripken Stadium.

== Media ==
Aberdeen's local radio station is WAMD, broadcasting at 970 on the AM dial. Local newspaper coverage is provided by Harford County publications The Aegis and The Record. Electronic media covering Aberdeen issues is Aberdeen Patch and The Dagger Press.

Aberdeen is served by Baltimore television stations, but it is not uncommon for residents to also get Philadelphia and Harrisburg-Lancaster-York stations.
