= Playboy Enterprises, Inc. v. Welles =

- Court: United States Court of Appeals for the Ninth Circuit
- Argued: September 11, 2001
- Decided: February 1, 2002
- Citation: 279 F.3d 796

Holding
- Use of a trademarked term for metatags at a website, and for advertising one's affiliations for self-identification, are nominative use and not a violation of American trademark law.

Court membership
- Judges sitting: Betty Binns Fletcher, Thomas G. Nelson, Marsha Berzon

Case opinions
- Majority: Thomas G. Nelson

Keywords
- trademark infringement, trademark dilution, metatags, cyberlaw

Playboy Enterprises, Inc. v. Welles, 279 F.3d 796 (9th Cir., 2002), was a ruling at the United States Court of Appeals for the Ninth Circuit. The ruling was an important early precedent on the nominative use of trademarked terms for self-identification on the World Wide Web.

== Facts ==
Terri Welles modeled for Playboy magazine and was named Playboy's Playmate of the Year ("PMOY") in 1981. In the mid-1990s Welles established a personal and promotional website in which she described herself as a former Playboy model and Playmate of the Year, frequently using the magazine's name plus the acronym "PMOY". Welles also used those terms in the site's metatags for searching purposes, and in banner ads that advertised the availability of her site elsewhere.

Playboy Enterprises, Inc. filed suit against Welles, claiming trademark infringement and trademark dilution. Welles responded that she could not legitimately describe herself without using the magazine's trademarked terms, and in doing so she was engaged in nominative use (a component of the fair use defense in trademark law) of the trademarks rather than infringement of them.

The case was first heard at the District Court for the Southern District of California, which ruled in favor of Welles and allowed her to continue using the trademarked terms at her website. Playboy appealed to the Ninth Circuit.

== Circuit court opinion ==
The Ninth Circuit affirmed most of the district court's ruling, and found that Welles had not infringed on the Playboy trademarks and could claim the nominative use defense. According to American trademark law, nominative use of a different party's trademarks is permitted when:

1. The product or service can not be readily identified without using the trademark (i.e. the trademark is descriptive of a person, place, or product attribute);
2. Only so much of the mark may be used as is reasonably necessary for identification (e.g. the words may be reasonably used but not the specific font or logo); and
3. The user does nothing to suggest sponsorship or endorsement by the trademark owner, which applies even if the nominative use is commercial.

Playboy Enterprises claimed that Welles's use of its trademarks was an infringement because her actions were likely to cause confusion among web users who could conclude that her site was the official Playboy site. Here the company claimed that Welles's site caused initial interest confusion, in the belief that web users interested in purchasing Playboy merchandise would be confused and think that Welles's site was the forum at which to do it. That legal doctrine had been defined by the Ninth Circuit precedent Brookfield Communications, Inc. v. West Coast Entertainment Corp. in 1999.

The district court found that Playboy Enterprises failed to present any evidence that Welles's use of the trademarked terms at her website damaged its merchandise sales, that her usage was likely to lead users to believe that her site was affiliated with the magazine, or that an appreciable number of web users would land on Welles' site upon searching for the Playboy site. Therefore, the company's trademarks were not diluted by Welles's use of them on her own site.

Furthermore, the court held that Welles was entitled to mention the name of the magazine and its related terms like "PMOY" in a basic description of herself for identification and promotion purposes. This in turn was an allowable nominative use of the trademarks. The truly new issue to be decided in this case was the matter of trademark usage in the metatags for a website created by a different party. Here the circuit court ruled that Welles's use of the trademarked terms for this purpose was nominative as well. However, she was not permitted to use the distinctive Playboy rabbit logo at her site.

== Impact ==
Playboy Enterprises, Inc. v. Welles has been noted as an important early Internet law precedent, clarifying the use of trademarks at sites designed by, and promoting, parties other than the owners of those trademarks. The ruling was especially influential in addressing this matter in the use of metatags, which can affect the results when a web user searches for an official site but finds an unaffiliated site in which the owner is only mentioned for descriptive purposes.
