= Griffith House (Aberdeen, Maryland) =

Historic house in Maryland, United States

- U.S. National Register of Historic Places
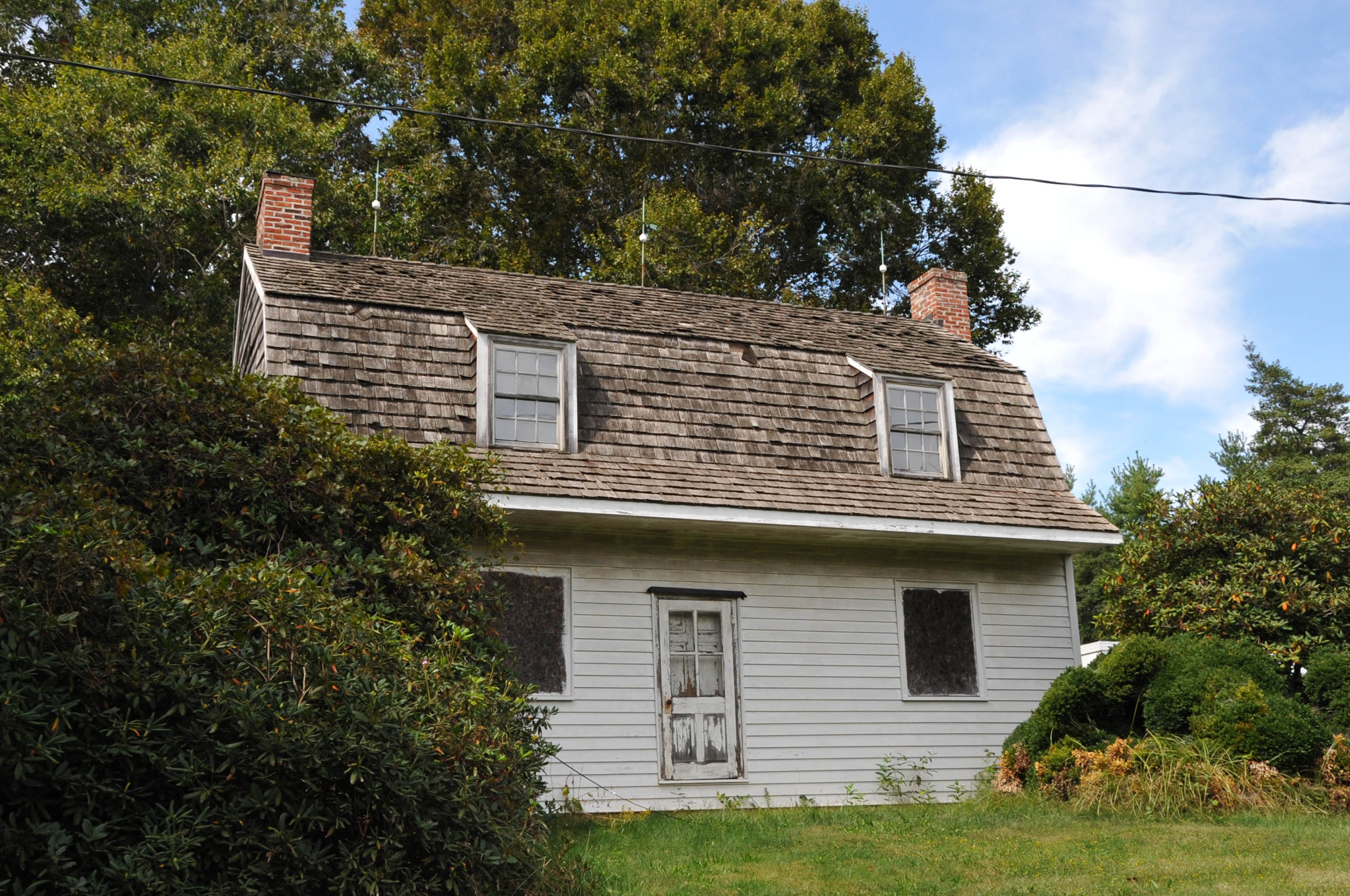
- Griffith House in 2008

- Location within Maryland Location within the United States
- Location: 1120 Old Philadelphia Road (MD 7), Aberdeen, Maryland
- Coordinates: 39°29′18″N 76°11′41″W
- Area: 6 acres (2.4 ha)
- NRHP reference No.: 78001465
- Added to NRHP: November 14, 1978

Griffith House, or Wright House, is a historic home located at Aberdeen, Harford County, Maryland, United States. It dates to the 18th century and is a 1 1/2-story, frame house measuring approximately 18 1/2 by 38 feet. The house is reflective of the type of dwelling of a moderately successful 18th-century farmer or planter.

Griffith House was listed on the National Register of Historic Places in 1978.
