= Kyle Bosworth =

American football player (born 1986)

No. 56, 58
- Position: Linebacker

Personal information
- Born: November 21, 1986 (age 39); Irving, Texas, U.S.
- Listed height: 6 ft 1 in (1.85 m)
- Listed weight: 245 lb (111 kg)

Career information
- High school: Plano West (Plano, Texas)
- College: UCLA
- NFL draft: 2010: undrafted

Career history
- Jacksonville Jaguars (2010−2012); New York Giants (2013)*; Dallas Cowboys (2013)
- * Offseason or practice squad member only

Career NFL statistics
- Total tackles: 48
- Interceptions: 1
- Stats at Pro Football Reference

Kyle Louis Bosworth (born November 21, 1986) is an American former professional football player who was a linebacker in the National Football League (NFL) for the Jacksonville Jaguars and Dallas Cowboys. He was signed by the Jaguars as an undrafted free agent in 2010. He played college football for the UCLA Bruins.

== Early life ==
Bosworth attended Plano West Senior High School, where he played as a linebacker and fullback. As a junior, he registered 116 tackles (4 for loss) and 4 fumble recoveries. He received All-District, All-County, All-County MVP, All-County Defensive Player of the Year and honorable-mention All-State honors.

As a senior, he tallied 115 tackles (12 for loss), one sack, 3 interceptions and 6 touchdowns, while contributing to the school winning its first city championship. The team won the 2004 Bi-District championship and was an Area finalist. He received All-District, All-County, Co-Defensive Player of the Year honors and honorable-mention All-State honors. He was selected to play in the 2005 Coca-Cola Bowl. He finished high school career with 231 tackles, 12 tackles for loss, 3 interceptions, one sack and six fumble recoveries.

He also competed in track, in the shot put, discus throw and 440 metres relay events. He was third in the District 8-5A discus with a mark of 143-5 1/2 as a senior.

== College career ==
Bosworth accepted a football scholarship from the University of California, Los Angeles. As a freshman with the Bruins, he appeared in 8 games, playing primarily on the kickoff special teams units. He missed 2 games with an injured thumb.

As a sophomore, he appeared in all 13 games with one start. He played primarily on special teams and posted 13 defensive tackles (7 solo). On September 1, he made 2 tackles against Stanford as UCLA won 45–17. He played the entire second half in place of injured middle linebacker Christian Taylor and had 4 tackles against the University of Arizona. He made his first college start against the University of Oregon and had two tackle assists.

As a junior, he appeared in all 13 games with 7 starts. He had 74 tackles (fifth on the team). On September 1, 2008, he recorded 5 tackles and a pass defended against No. 18 ranked Tennessee as UCLA won in overtime 27–24. He had 8 tackles (one for loss) and one pass defensed against Oregon State University. He had 19 tackles (eighth in school history) against Washington State University. He had 12 tackles in the 2007 Las Vegas Bowl.

As a senior in 2008, he appeared in only 2 games with 2 starts. He sprained his knee against Brigham Young University and missed the final 10 games of the season.

Bosworth received a medical redshirt after his injury and came back as a fifth year senior in 2009. He appeared in 13 games with 12 starts. He totaled 77 tackles (second on the team), 7.5 tackles for loss (sixth on the team) and 1.5 sacks. On September 5, 2009, he recorded 4 tackles against San Diego State while UCLA went on to win the game 33–14. On September 12, he made 10 tackles against Tennessee helping UCLA win that the game 19-15. On September 19, 2009, he recorded 4 tackles against Kansas State as UCLA wins the game 23-9. On October 3, he had 8 tackles against Stanford as UCLA lost 16-24. He was Defensive Co-winner of UCLA's Jerry Long "Heart" Award following the conclusion of the season.

He finished his college career with 49 game appearances, 21 starts, 174 tackles (106 solo), 2 sacks, 12.5 tackles for loss, 3 passes defensed and 2 forced fumbles.

== Professional career ==
=== 2010 NFL Combine ===
Pre-draft measurables
Height	Weight	Arm length	Hand span	40-yard dash	10-yard split	20-yard split	20-yard shuttle	Three-cone drill	Vertical jump	Broad jump	Bench press
6 ft 0 5/8 in (1.84 m)	236 lb (107 kg)	32 in (0.81 m)	9 1/4 in (0.23 m)	4.62 s	1.58 s	2.66 s	4.11 s	6.67 s	32.5 in (0.83 m)	9 ft 9 in (2.97 m)	25 reps
All values from NFL Combine/Pro Day

=== Jacksonville Jaguars ===
Bosworth was signed as an undrafted free agent by the Jacksonville Jaguars after the 2010 NFL draft on April 24. He was placed on the injured reserve list on September 4.

On November 15, 2011, he was placed on the injured reserve list because of a broken hand he suffered against the Indianapolis Colts in Week 9. He appeared in 9 games and made 7 special teams tackles.

In the Jaguars' 2012 season opener against the Minnesota Vikings, he started at outside linebacker in place of the injured Daryl Smith. He started 5 games, making 53 defensive tackles (4 tackles for loss), one interception and 14 special teams tackles (led the team). He wasn't re-signed after the season.

=== New York Giants ===
On May 29, 2013, he signed as a free agent with the New York Giants. He was released on August 31.

=== Dallas Cowboys ===
On September 1, 2013, the Dallas Cowboys replaced defensive lineman Sean Lissemore by claiming Bosworth off waivers, in order to help improve their special teams units. He was released on December 17. He appeared in 14 games and finished tied for second on the team with 12 special teams tackles.

== Personal life ==
He is the nephew of former NFL linebacker, Brian Bosworth. His twin brother, Korey, was signed as an undrafted free agent by the Denver Broncos, but was waived.

Bosworth married Kara Keough, the daughter of The Real Housewives of Orange County star Jeana Keough, on February 8, 2014. In 2016 they welcomed their first child, a daughter Decker Kate Their second child, first son, McCoy Casey Bosworth, died 6 days after birth, from shoulder dystocia and compressed umbilical cord, in April 2020. In 2021 they welcomed a second son Vaughn Mack and in 2023 they completed they welcomed another baby girl.

He is currently a licensed real estate agent in both Texas and Florida, including being a cofounder of RedZone Realty Group with former Jacksonville Jaguars teammate Jason Babin.
