= Nominative use =

Doctrine in US trademark law

Nominative use, also "nominative fair use", is a legal doctrine that provides an affirmative defense to trademark infringement as enunciated by the United States Ninth Circuit, by which a person may use the trademark of another as a reference to describe the other product, or to compare it to their own. Nominative use may be considered to be either related to, or a type of "trademark fair use" (sometimes called "classic fair use" or "statutory fair use"). All "trademark fair use" doctrines, however classified, are distinct from the fair use doctrine in copyright law. However, the fair use of a trademark may be protected under copyright laws depending on the complexity or creativity of the mark as a design logo.

The nominative use test essentially states that one party may use or refer to the trademark of another if:

1. The product or service cannot be readily identified without using the trademark (e.g. trademark is descriptive of a person, place, or product attribute).
2. The user only uses as much of the mark as is necessary for the identification (e.g. the words but not the font or symbol).
3. The user does nothing to suggest sponsorship or endorsement by the trademark holder. This applies even if the nominative use is commercial, and the same test applies to metatags.

Furthermore, if a use is found to be nominative, then by the definition of non-trademark uses, it can not dilute the trademark.

Nominative use does not require that ownership of the trademark be acknowledged, for example by use of a sentence such as "UNIX is a registered trademark of The Open Group". Such statements may, however, be required by the terms of a license agreement between the parties, and they may be prudent (and courteous) as a way of preventing misunderstandings or allegations of passing off.

== History of the doctrine ==
The nominative use doctrine was first enunciated in 1992 by the U.S. Court of Appeals for the Ninth Circuit in New Kids on the Block v. News America Publishing, Inc. In New Kids on the Block, the court had examined a "New Kids on the Block survey" performed by the defendant, and found that there was no way to ask people their opinion of the band without using its name. For instance, one could refer to the Minnesota Twins as "that professional baseball team from Minnesota," but it is much more acceptable to just refer to them by their trade name.

In Playboy Enterprises, Inc. v. Welles, where Playboy Playmate Terri Welles was sued for using the trademarked term "Playmate of the Year" in a meta keyword within the HTML code of her website. The court found that Welles had to use the term to completely describe herself, as she had been given that title by the trademark holder. In other words, individuals are not compelled by trademark law to use "absurd turns of phrase" simply to avoid trademark liability.

In New Kids and in Playboy v. Welles, the courts examined older cases, identifying a unifying principle that they then named "nominative use". Among the older cases cited by the Court in Playboy v. Welles was Volkswagenwerk Aktiengesellschaft v. Church, in which the Ninth Circuit had ruled that an independent auto repair shop that specialized in repairing Volkswagen cars and mentioned that fact in their advertising was not liable for trademark infringement so long as they did not claim or imply that they had any business relationship with the Volkswagen company. In the case of Yue v. MSC Software Corporation, the Northern District of California held that the nominative fair use defense is a burden-shifting defense properly decided at the summary judgment stage and would be premature to raise in a motion to dismiss.
