= Perryman, Maryland =

- Census-designated place
- Location of Perryman, Maryland
- Coordinates: 39°28′7″N 76°12′47″W
- Country: United States
- State: Maryland
- County: Harford

Area
  - Total: 5.54 sq mi (14.36 km^{2})
  - Land: 5.48 sq mi (14.20 km^{2})
  - Water: 0.062 sq mi (0.16 km^{2})
- Elevation: 39 ft (12 m)

Population (2020)
  - Total: 2,496
  - Density: 455.3/sq mi (175.78/km^{2})
- Time zone: UTC−5 (Eastern (EST))
  - Summer (DST): UTC−4 (EDT)
- ZIP code: 21130
- Area code: 410
- FIPS code: 24-61075
- GNIS feature ID: 0590998

Perryman is an unincorporated community and census-designated place (CDP) in Harford County, Maryland, United States. The population was 2,342 at the 2010 census.

== History ==
St. George's Parish Vestry House was listed on the National Register of Historic Places in 1976. Amtrak's Northeast Corridor high-speed rail line runs through the community; however, Amtrak and MARC trains do not stop as there is no station.

== Geography ==
Perryman is located in southern Harford County at 39°28′7″N 76°12′47″W (39.468509, −76.213090). It is bordered to the west by Church Creek and the Bush River, an arm of Chesapeake Bay; to the south by Sod Run, an inlet of the Bush River; to the east by Chelsea Road and Aberdeen Proving Ground; and to the north by the city of Aberdeen. The community of Riverside touches the northwest side of Perryman.

U.S. Route 40 (Pulaski Highway) runs through the northern part of Perryman, leading northeast 23 miles (37 km) to Elkton and southwest 27 miles (43 km) to downtown Baltimore.

According to the United States Census Bureau, the Perryman CDP has a total area of 5.6 square miles (14.5 km^{2}), of which 5.5 square miles (14.3 km^{2}) is land and 0.1 square miles (0.2 km^{2}), or 1.08%, are water.

=== Climate ===
The climate in this area is characterized by hot, humid summers and generally mild to cool winters. According to the Köppen Climate Classification system, Perryman has a humid subtropical climate, abbreviated "Cfa" on climate maps.

== Demographics ==
Historical population
Census	Pop.	Note	%±
2000	2,461		—
2010	2,342		−4.8%
2020	2,496		6.6%
U.S. Decennial Census

=== 2020 census ===
As of the 2020 census, Perryman had a population of 2,496. The median age was 42.2 years. 20.7% of residents were under the age of 18 and 19.0% of residents were 65 years of age or older. For every 100 females there were 90.0 males, and for every 100 females age 18 and over there were 87.4 males age 18 and over.

47.2% of residents lived in urban areas, while 52.8% lived in rural areas.

There were 1,068 households in Perryman, of which 25.3% had children under the age of 18 living in them. Of all households, 35.7% were married-couple households, 19.7% were households with a male householder and no spouse or partner present, and 35.5% were households with a female householder and no spouse or partner present. About 30.8% of all households were made up of individuals and 13.5% had someone living alone who was 65 years of age or older.

There were 1,170 housing units, of which 8.7% were vacant. The homeowner vacancy rate was 3.4% and the rental vacancy rate was 5.0%.

Racial composition as of the 2020 census
Race	Number	Percent
White	1,586	63.5%
Black or African American	609	24.4%
American Indian and Alaska Native	11	0.4%
Asian	33	1.3%
Native Hawaiian and Other Pacific Islander	0	0.0%
Some other race	36	1.4%
Two or more races	221	8.9%
Hispanic or Latino (of any race)	156	6.2%

=== 2000 census ===
As of the census of 2000, there were 2,461 people, 960 households, and 696 families residing in the CDP. The population density was 450.2 inhabitants per square mile (173.8/km^{2}). There were 1,024 housing units at an average density of 187.3 per square mile (72.3/km^{2}). The racial makeup of the CDP was 71.76% White, 24.42% African American, 0.24% Native American, 0.81% Asian, 0.69% from other races, and 2.07% from two or more races. Hispanic or Latino of any race were 2.64% of the population.

There were 960 households, out of which 37.5% had children under the age of 18 living with them, 47.0% were married couples living together, 21.5% had a female householder with no husband present, and 27.5% were non-families. 21.9% of all households were made up of individuals, and 6.1% had someone living alone who was 65 years of age or older. The average household size was 2.55 and the average family size was 2.94.

In the CDP, the population was spread out, with 28.7% under the age of 18, 7.5% from 18 to 24, 29.7% from 25 to 44, 23.0% from 45 to 64, and 11.1% who were 65 years of age or older. The median age was 36 years. For every 100 females, there were 88.4 males. For every 100 females age 18 and over, there were 83.3 males.

The median income for a household in the CDP was $33,972, and the median income for a family was $40,938. Males had a median income of $35,979 versus $24,944 for females. The per capita income for the CDP was $17,236. About 17.5% of families and 17.4% of the population were below the poverty line, including 29.4% of those under age 18 and 2.9% of those age 65 or over.
