= Jeana Keough =

American actress

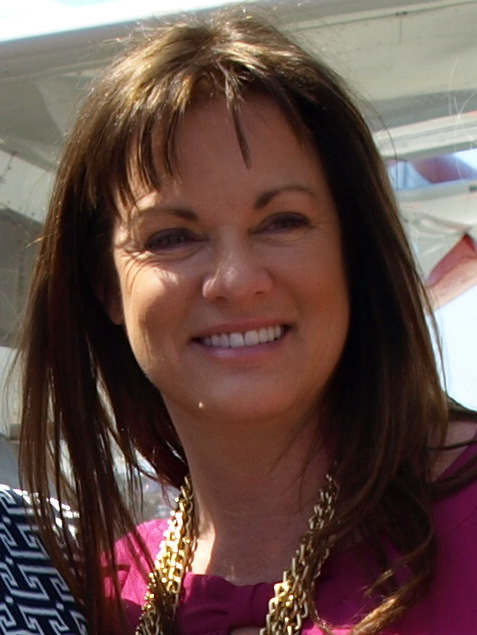
- Jeana Keough in 2009
- Born: Jeana Ellen Myers; September 18, 1955 (age 71); Milwaukee, Wisconsin
- Occupations: Television personality, actress, model, realtor
- Spouses: Gary Tomasino (divorced) Matt Keough (m. 1984; div. 2019)
- Children: 3

Playboy centerfold appearance
- November 1980
- Preceded by: Mardi Jacquet
- Succeeded by: Terri Welles

Personal details
- Height: 1.70 m (5 ft 7 in)

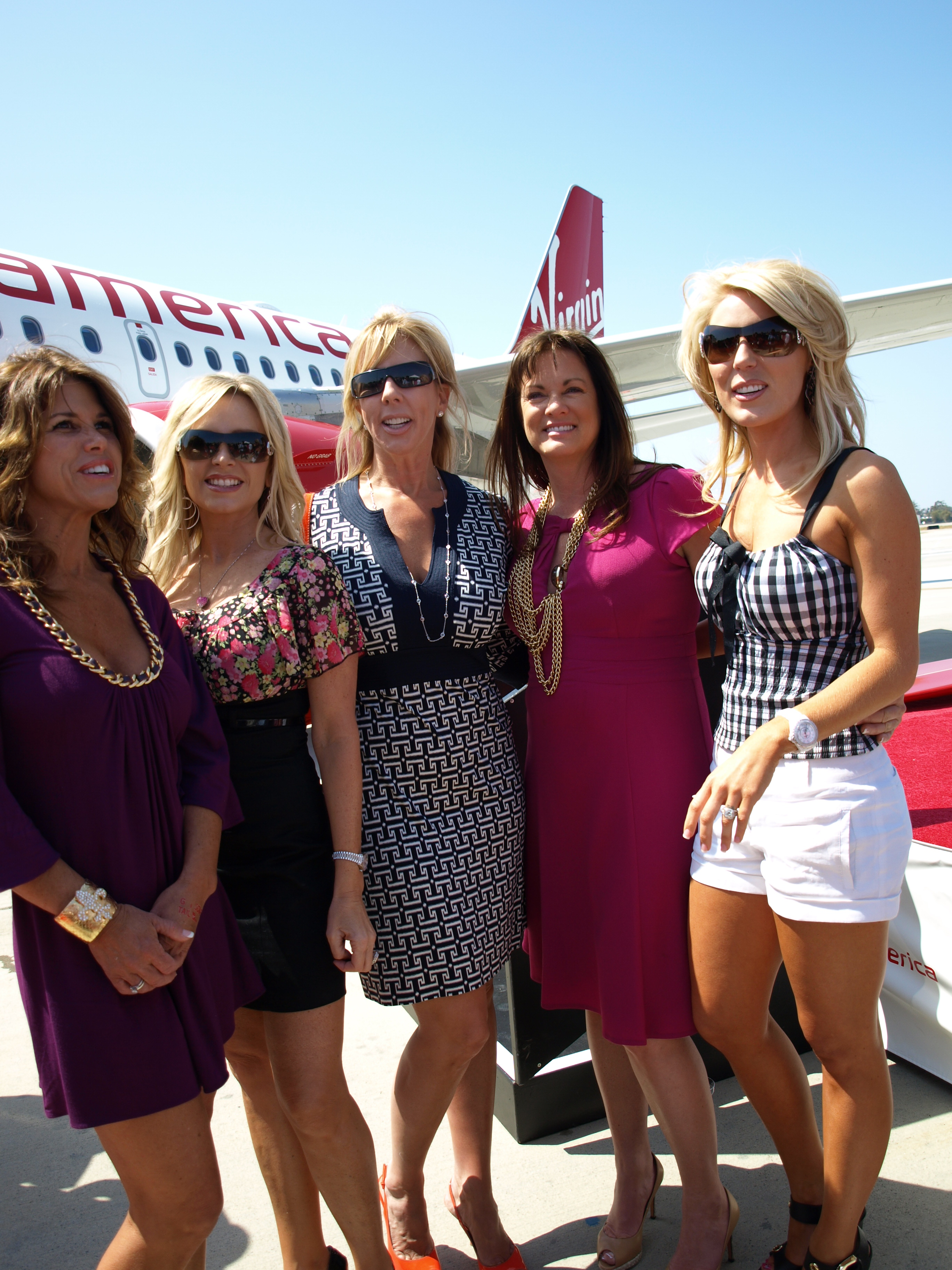
Keough pictured with Lynne Curtin, Tamra Judge, Vicki Gunvalson and Gretchen Rossi at the Virgin America OC Launch in 2009

Jeana Ellen Keough (née Myers; formerly Tomasino; born September 18, 1955) is an American television personality, realtor, actress, and model. Keough graduated from Whitnall High School located in Greenfield, Wisconsin in 1972. When she was younger, she worked as a model and actress, including as one of the three beautiful muses in the ZZ Top music videos "Legs", "Sharp Dressed Man" and "Gimme All Your Lovin". She was also the Playboy magazine Playmate of the Month in November 1980.

Keough works as a real estate salesperson in Aliso Viejo, California. She is also a former cast member of the reality show The Real Housewives of Orange County.

In July 2026, Keough was diagnosed with squamous cell carcinoma of the tongue.

== Family ==
Keough was married to her second husband, Matt Keough (1955-2020), a second-generation major league baseball player, pitcher for the Oakland Athletics and a special assistant to Oakland A's general manager. They legally divorced in 2019, many years after they had separated, and just months before his 2020 death. The couple shared three children: Shane, Kara and Colton. Their oldest son, Shane, is a third-generation professional baseball player, having signed as a minor league outfielder in June 2006 with the Class A affiliate of the Oakland Athletics, but he was released on July 2, 2010. Daughter Kara married NFL player Kyle Bosworth.

== Career ==
Keough appeared in several movies and television shows during the early to mid-1980s. As an actress, she has been credited as Jeana Tomasina or Jeana Keough.

=== Playboy Playmate ===
Keough was Playboy magazine's Playmate of the Month in November 1980. In 1983, she appeared in "Playboy Video Magazine, Vol. 4." and still makes occasional promotional appearances for Playboy.

=== Music videos ===
Along with Danièle Arnaud and fellow Playmate Kymberly Herrin, Keough was one of the three muses in the ZZ Top music videos "Legs", "Sharp Dressed Man", "Gimme All Your Lovin'", and "Sleeping Bag".

=== Reality television ===
As Jeana Keough, she is one of the original cast members of the reality show, The Real Housewives of Orange County, on the Bravo cable network. In season five, she appeared as a regular cast member in three episodes. Since departing as a full-time member, Keough has appeared as a recurring cast member in season six and has made multiple guest appearances in the later seasons.

Keough was featured as a client on the Bravo series Thintervention with Jackie Warner.

=== Television ===
Year	Title	Role	Notes
1980	Pink Lady	Herself	Episode #1.3
1983	T. J. Hooker	Gloria	Episode #3.10: "Blue Murder"
1984	The A-Team	Denise	Episode #3.1: "Bullets and Bikinis"
1984	St. Elsewhere	Hawkin's Dream	Episode #3.8: "Sweet Dreams"
1985	Cheers	Becky	Episode #3.15: "King of the Hill"
2006–2012, 2015–2017, 2022, 2026	The Real Housewives of Orange County	Herself	Main cast (seasons 1–5), Friend (season 6), Guest (seasons 7, 10–12, 16, 20), Narrator (season 15)

=== Film ===
Year	Title	Role	Notes
1979	The Death of Ocean View Park		as Jeana Tomasina
1979	The Capture of Bigfoot	Dancer	as Jeana Tomasina
1981	Lovely But Deadly	Woman with Stuck Zipper	as Jeana Tomasina
1981	History of the World, Part I	Vestal Virgin	as Jeana Tomasina
1981	Looker	Suzy	as Jeana Tomasina
1982	The Beach Girls	Ducky	as Jeana Tomasina
1982	Six Pack	Lonnie	as Jeana Tomasina
1982	Double Exposure	Renee	as Jeana Tomasina
1983	10 to Midnight	Karen	as Jeana Tomasina
1983	Off the Wall	Mrs. Buck Banner	as Jeana Tomasina
1984	Up the Creek	Molly	as Jeana Tomasina

== See also ==
- List of people in Playboy 1980–89

Gig Gangel	Sandy Cagle	Henriette Allais	Liz Glazowski	Martha Thomsen	Ola Ray
Teri Peterson	Victoria Cooke	Lisa Welch	Mardi Jacquet	Jeana Keough	Terri Welles
