= Matt Keough =

American baseball player (1955–2020)

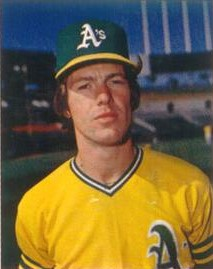
- Pitcher
- Born: July 3, 1955; Pomona, California, U.S.
- Died: May 1, 2020 (aged 64); Trabuco Canyon, California, U.S.
- Batted: Right Threw: Right

Professional debut
- MLB: September 3, 1977, for the Oakland Athletics
- NPB: April 10, 1987, for the Hanshin Tigers

Last appearance
- MLB: October 2, 1986, for the Houston Astros
- NPB: September 27, 1990, for the Hanshin Tigers

MLB statistics
- Win–loss record: 58–84
- Earned run average: 4.17
- Strikeouts: 590

NPB statistics
- Win–loss record: 45–44
- Earned run average: 3.73
- Strikeouts: 398
- Stats at Baseball Reference

Teams
- Oakland Athletics (1977–1983); New York Yankees (1983); St. Louis Cardinals (1985); Chicago Cubs (1986); Houston Astros (1986); Hanshin Tigers (1987–1990)

Career highlights and awards
- All-Star (1978)

Matthew Lon Keough (/ˈkiːoʊ/ KEE-oh; July 3, 1955 – May 1, 2020) was an American professional baseball player. He played in Major League Baseball (MLB) as a right-handed pitcher from 1977 through 1986 for the Oakland Athletics (1977–1983), New York Yankees (1983–1984), St. Louis Cardinals (1985), Chicago Cubs (1986) and Houston Astros (1986). After his time in MLB, Keough pitched in Nippon Professional Baseball for the Hanshin Tigers for 4 seasons from 1987 through 1990.

== Career ==
Keough graduated from Corona del Mar High School in Newport Beach, California, in 1973. The Oakland Athletics selected Keough in seventh round of the 1973 Major League Baseball draft.

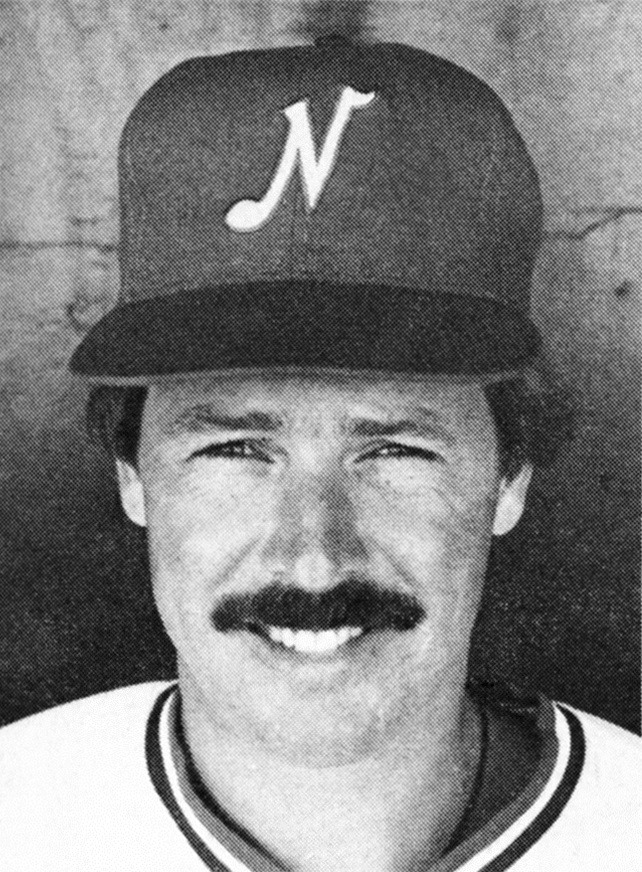
Keough with the Nashville Sounds in 1984

Keough was signed by Oakland as an infielder. He was supposed to replace departed Sal Bando at third base, but after leading the California League in hitting while playing for Modesto in his second year of professional baseball in 1975, he hit a disappointing .210 in Double-A in 1976. He was converted to a pitcher and joined Oakland a year later. He was selected to the All-Star Game in his rookie season for the 1978 Athletics, recording a 3.24 ERA despite his 8–15 record. In 1979, he tied a major league record by losing his first 14 decisions and finished with a 2–17 record. His winning percentage of .105 was the worst recorded by a major league pitcher with 15 or more decisions since 1916, when Philadelphia A's teammates Jack Nabors and Tom Sheehan finished the season with winning percentages of .048 and .059, respectively. From 1978 to 1979, Keough made 28 consecutive starts without a victory, tying Cliff Curtis (1910–11) for the longest streak in MLB history according to the Elias Sports Bureau. The streak was later tied by Jo-Jo Reyes (2008–11).

Keough resurged in 1980 with a 16–13 mark, earning AL Comeback Player of the Year honors. In the 1981 strike-shortened season he finished 10–6, helping Oakland to clinch the AL Division Series. He pitched well in a losing effort in Game 3 of the AL Championship Series, giving up one earned run in 8 1/3 innings in a 4–0 loss to the New York Yankees.

Keough slumped again in 1982, tying for the AL lead with 18 losses against 11 wins in 34 starts. He also walked more batters than he struck out (101-to-75) and led the league in home runs (38) and earned runs (133) allowed. A number of baseball historians and statisticians have put this down to manager Billy Martin overworking Keough and the other members of the 1981 rotation. In 2006, Rob Neyer estimated that Keough threw 131 pitches per complete game in 1981, a heavy workload for a young pitcher even then.

In the 1983 mid-season, the Athletics traded Keough to the Yankees for Marshall Brant and Ben Callahan. Nursing a sore arm, he spent parts of two seasons in the minors and returned to the majors with the St. Louis Cardinals late in 1985. The next year, he divided his playing time between Triple-A, the Houston Astros, and Chicago Cubs. In 1987, he joined the Hanshin Tigers of Nippon Professional Baseball and pitched for them until 1990. He attempted a comeback to the major leagues with the California Angels in 1991 spring training but did not make the roster. In March 1992, he tried again with the Angels and had made the major league roster, but while sitting in the dugout during an exhibition game in which he was later scheduled to pitch, he was hit in the right temple by a foul ball off the bat of San Francisco Giants' John Patterson, seriously injuring him and ending his playing career.

Following his playing career, Keough worked for the A's and Angels both as a roving pitching coach and as an executive from 1992 to 1999. After that, he scouted for the Tampa Bay Devil Rays and was again an executive for Oakland.

Keough occasionally threw a spitball. Once, however, his spitball backfired on him. Keough threw a spitball that Boston Red Sox second baseman Jerry Remy missed and had seemingly struck out. Umpire Durwood Merrill, seeing the pitch end up in the dirt, assumed Remy had fouled off the pitch and so he remained at bat with two strikes. On the next pitch, Remy hit a home run, the last of his career.

In a nine-season career, Keough posted a 58–84 record with 590 strikeouts and a 4.17 ERA in 1,190 innings pitched, including seven shutouts and 57 complete games.

== Personal life ==
Keough's father, Marty Keough, and uncle, Joe Keough, both also played in the majors.

Keough was married to actress and November 1980 Playboy Playmate of the month, Jeana Tomasino in 1984. They unofficially separated in the 1990s, legally separated in 2004, and divorced in 2019. The two appeared on reality television on The Real Housewives of Orange County. The couple had three children: Shane, Kara, and Colton. Shane, their oldest son, played professional baseball, advancing as far as the Stockton Ports, a Class A affiliate of the Athletics, before being released in 2010. Kara married professional football player Kyle Bosworth.

Keough was sentenced to 180 days in jail in 2005 for driving under the influence, to another 180 days in jail in 2008 for violating his probation by drinking alcohol, and to a year in jail in 2010 for driving under the influence.

Keough died on May 1, 2020, in California at the age of 64. His ex-wife Jeana revealed the cause of death was a pulmonary embolism.

== See also ==
- List of second-generation Major League Baseball players
