= St. George's Parish Vestry House =

Historic church in Maryland, United States

- U.S. National Register of Historic Places
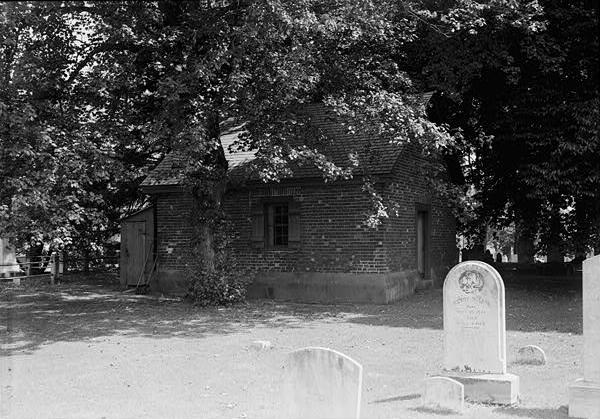
- Spesutia Parish Vestry House in 1936

- Location within Maryland Location within the United States
- Location: 1522 Perryman Rd., Perryman, Maryland
- Coordinates: 39°28′27″N 76°12′16″W
- Area: 20 acres (8.1 ha)
- Built: 1766
- NRHP reference No.: 76001001
- Added to NRHP: March 26, 1976

St. George's Parish Vestry House, also known as Spesutia Vestry House, is a historic Episcopal vestry house located at Perryman, Harford County, Maryland. It is a small structure of Flemish bond brick construction dating to about 1766.

It was listed on the National Register of Historic Places in 1976.
