= Phillips Army Airfield =

- IATA: APG; ICAO: KAPG; FAA LID: APG

Summary
- Airport type: Military
- Owner: United States Army
- Location: Aberdeen Proving Ground, Maryland
- Elevation AMSL: 57 ft / 17 m
- Coordinates: 39°27′58″N 076°10′08″W

Map
- Location of airport in Maryland

Runways
Direction	Length		Surface
Direction	ft	m	Surface
4/22	7,997	2,437	Asphalt
8/26 - out of service	4,849	1,478	Asphalt
17/35 - out of service	5,004	1,525	Asphalt
- Source: Federal Aviation Administration

Phillips Army Airfield (IATA: APG, ICAO: KAPG, FAA LID: APG) is a military airport located at Aberdeen Proving Ground, in Harford County, Maryland, United States.

This U.S. Army airfield has one asphalt paved runway: 4/22 is 7,997 by 200 feet (2,437 x 61 m) in service and two runways, 8/26 is 4,849 by 149 feet (1,478 x 45 m) and 17/35 is 5,004 by 149 feet (1,525 x 45 m), no longer in service.
