= List of Million Dollar Listing Los Angeles episodes =

Million Dollar Listing Los Angeles (previously Million Dollar Listing) is an American reality television series on Bravo that debuted on August 29, 2006. The series chronicles the professional and personal lives of six real estate agents — Josh Flagg, Madison Hildebrand, Josh Altman, James Harris, David Parnes, and Tracy Tutor Maltas — based in Beverly Hills, Hollywood, and Malibu, California as they sell high-end properties. It also gives viewers an inside look at the world of high-priced real estate in Los Angeles County. The series has three spin-offs, Million Dollar Listing New York, which premiered on March 7, 2012, Million Dollar Listing Miami, which premiered June 25, 2014, and Million Dollar Listing San Francisco, which premiered July 8, 2015.

== Series overview ==
| Season | Episodes | Originally released | |
| Season | Episodes | First released | Last released |
|---|---|---|---|
| 1 | 6 | August 29, 2006 | October 3, 2006 |
| 2 | 6 | August 5, 2008 | September 9, 2008 |
| 3 | 9 | October 12, 2009 | December 11, 2009 |
| 4 | 9 | February 3, 2011 | March 29, 2011 |
| 5 | 10 | June 6, 2012 | August 15, 2012 |
| 6 | 12 | August 7, 2013 | October 23, 2013 |
| 7 | 12 | August 20, 2014 | November 5, 2014 |
| 8 | 14 | September 2, 2015 | December 9, 2015 |
| 9 | 12 | October 6, 2016 | December 29, 2016 |
| 10 | 12 | November 2, 2017 | January 25, 2018 |
| 11 | 12 | January 3, 2019 | March 28, 2019 |
| 12 | 12 | June 16, 2020 | September 1, 2020 |
| 13 | 14 | September 2, 2021 | December 16, 2021 |
| Josh & Josh | 4 | December 23, 2021 | January 13, 2022 |
| 14 | 12 | December 8, 2022 | March 2, 2023 |
| 15 | 10 | July 10, 2024 | September 11, 2024 |

== Episodes ==
=== Season 1 (2006) ===
| No. overall | No. in season | Title | Original release date | Prod. code |
|---|---|---|---|---|
| 1 | 1 | "The Ultimate Luxury Playground" | August 29, 2006 | 106 |
In Hollywood, newly single agent Shannon McLeod tries to sell her ex-fiancé's house without ruining their relationship. Malibu agent Madison Hildebrand tries to get top dollar for a dream estate in disrepair.
| 2 | 2 | "Co-Listers Can't Be Choosers" | September 5, 2006 | 101 |
Malibu Condo Queen Lydia Simon needs to plan a wedding and sell a condo for top dollar. In Hollywood, married super agents Dia and Ray struggle to deal with a desperate divorcee who has to sell the home she loves.
| 3 | 3 | "Trouble in Paradise" | September 12, 2006 | 102 |
What happens when two Malibu real estate agents work together and one decides to sell his hot beach house and other decides he has the perfect clients? It's sure to get interesting. In Hollywood, super agent Michael Wegmann tries to deal with a reluctant seller with a wife who's eager to sell.
| 4 | 4 | "Deals, Discounts and Potential Disaster" | September 19, 2006 | 104 |
In Hollywood, Ray and Dia work with a homeowner who's leaving the country because of his political views. In Malibu, smooth talker Scotty Brown tries to get top dollar for a socialite seller.
| 5 | 5 | "Relationship Negotiation" | September 26, 2006 | 103 |
Hollywood's rookie agent Chase Campen tries to navigate a big listing, but problems abound. In Malibu, Scotty wins a bet and the next hot listing.
| 6 | 6 | "Three's a Crowd" | October 3, 2006 | 105 |
In Hollywood, married super agents Dia and Ray are eager to unload the family home of a lonely daughter who needs to cut the ties. In Malibu, Carol Bird tries to sell a horse estate and recording studio for a world famous violinist.

=== Season 2 (2008) ===
| No. overall | No. in season | Title | Original release date |
|---|---|---|---|
| 7 | 1 | "Sellers From Hell" | August 5, 2008 |
In the premiere episode of the second season, Josh tries to persuade his pal, Dr. Sam, to buy a fixer-upper with huge profit potential, but it puts a strain on their friendship.
| 8 | 2 | "Mondo Condo" | August 12, 2008 |
The pressure heats up for Madison, who is missing an assistant and is left in a tight situation on a high-end deal.
| 9 | 3 | "Business and Pleasure" | August 19, 2008 |
The rich widow of a famous businessman impatiently demands that Chad find her a beach house in the most exclusive part of Malibu.
| 10 | 4 | "Dire Buyers" | August 26, 2008 |
Josh's business-savvy grandmother finds him an "obituary listing," but when he ends up representing both the buyer and the seller he has to find a way to delicately negotiate.
| 11 | 5 | "Showdowns" | September 2, 2008 |
Just as Chad is about to strike a deal for his NBA star seller, an unexpected setback threatens the deal.
| 12 | 6 | "Epiphanies" | September 9, 2008 |
Madison reaches a career milestone with his first double-digit listing, and attempts to make a buyer — a picky client of Josh's — fall in love with the property. Meanwhile, conflict between Josh and Chad explodes.

=== Season 3 (2009) ===
| No. overall | No. in season | Title | Original release date |
|---|---|---|---|
| 13 | 1 | "No One Is Recession-Proof" | October 12, 2009 |
In the worst market he's ever seen, Josh lists a rundown Beverly Hills mansion to sell it quickly, but his potential buyer continuously thwarts negotiations. Meanwhile, Chad puts his reputation on the line by listing a million-dollar home for a spa owner, and Madison eagerly takes on the Malibu estate.
| 14 | 2 | "Big Numbers, Small Deals" | October 19, 2009 |
Josh's grandmother, Edith, gives him a tip about real estate in a down market, so he lists a plot of land in a golf course community, while simultaneously trying to ink a deal in Bel Air in under 24-hours. Chad lands a gem of a listing in LA's "Golden Triangle", but quickly finds the market's enthusiasm for the neighborhood has tarnished. Also, Madison discovers that no matter how strong his business relationships might be, the numbers don't always add up.
| 15 | 3 | "Dolphins, Rats & Next Door Neighbors" | October 26, 2009 |
Chad and Madison are both invited to speak at a real estate conference in Arizona where the topic is the declining market for high-end homes, while Josh expands his sales territory by listing a $10 million mansion in Orange County's Newport Coast. Chad also tries to broaden his territory by listing a tiny bungalow, but finds that the home is plagued with a problem that threatens to scare away buyers.
| 16 | 4 | "Jumping Through Hoops for a Signature" | November 2, 2009 |
Josh wants a listing on 20 acres of ocean view land in Malibu, while Madison hunts for investment properties for one of his most demanding clients. Chad lists a Hollywood Hills pad that should be a slam-dunk with the help of another agent and also asks his girlfriend Victoria a question that will make or break their relationship.
| 17 | 5 | "Looking to Score in Malibu" | November 9, 2009 |
Competition between the agents heats up in Malibu when Chad tries to steal one of Madison's former listings, while Madison tries to take on a different yet familiar Malibu listing with an ocean view. Josh makes a spur of the moment gamble while also dealing with a potential health issue.
| 18 | 6 | "Sweet Deals and Icing on the Cake" | November 16, 2009 |
Josh thinks he can move a less than stellar Hollywood Hills home by focusing on its spectacular city views and Madison puts his friendship and his reputation at risk when he suggests a home lease. Meanwhile, Chad lists a $10-million gem in Orange County's exclusive waterfront Corona Del Mar neighborhood, but struggles to balance the sale of the house with his relationship with Victoria.
| 19 | 7 | "Million Dollar Wild Swan Chase" | November 23, 2009 |
Josh attempts to list the house of his friend and travels with his Grandmother in an effort to sort out his memory issues while Chad wins a listing for a prime Hollywood condo and gets a surprising birthday gift from Victoria. Madison attempts to find the "ideal" Malibu home and also attends a Hollywood event, discovering that it is hosted by Chad.
| 20 | 8 | "In Real Estate Everything's Personal" | November 30, 2009 |
Josh runs into trouble with another Beverly Hills agent, while Chad and Madison struggle to compete for a high-end condo. Chad also attempts to balance time with Victoria and a big-name client and Madison thinks he may have revealed too much when he "strips down" for a good cause. Drama ensues when all three realtors are drawn towards an open house in Malibu.
| 21 | 9 | "Busted Dreams and Busted Homes" | December 7, 2009 |
Josh tries to move a half-demolished home in Beverly Hills only to have a buyer's agent tear into him during negotiations. Chad thinks he's listing a house for a friend, but finds out first-hand how the foreclosure problem is taking its toll. He then tries to win back Victoria by mixing business and pleasure. Madison goes the extra mile to sell a family's dream home, but the reality of the housing market makes an unwanted visit. An LA broker invites Chad, Madison and Josh to help him work on a good cause, but clashing egos stir up drama amongst the three.

=== Season 4 (2011) ===
| No. overall | No. in season | Title | Original release date | U.S. viewers (millions) |
|---|---|---|---|---|
| 22 | 1 | "Bad Market for Mansions" | February 3, 2011 | 1.03 |
Josh Flagg and Madison Hildebrand return and are joined by Josh Altman, a Boston boy that brings some east coast flare to the west coast real estate market. In this first episode, Josh Flagg must sell an overbuilt mansion in a modest suburban neighborhood for an eccentric client whose expectations are as overblown as his property. Meanwhile, Josh Altman has to contend with an angry seller after promising him his super-hip home will be an easy sell and a young entrepreneur with money to burn has Madison venturing outside his comfort zone in search of the ultimate party pad.
| 23 | 2 | "No Guarantees in the Real Estate Game" | February 10, 2011 | 1.06 |
With a client who refuses to accept the realities of the market, Josh Flagg must make an agonizing decision. As a favor to his mother, Josh Altman takes on a less-than million-dollar-listing and risks losing his commission.
| 24 | 3 | "Seeing Double" | February 17, 2011 | N/A |
Madison is shocked when his bully of a client threatens to fire him. Josh Altman tours one of Madison's listings with a celebrity client and questions his pricing strategy. Meanwhile, Josh Flagg decides to take his grandmother's advice and hire an assistant, however instead of hiring just one -- he considers a pair of identical blonde twins.
| 25 | 4 | "Sparks Fly" | February 24, 2011 | N/A |
Madison hosts a champagne open house for the top Realtors in Beverly Hills; it's a posh event until Josh Flagg crashes the party. Later, Josh Flagg hosts a late-night rock 'n' roll open house with his new twin interns. Josh Altman isn't impressed with the gimmicky event, but when he meets Madison's assistant Heather, there's instant chemistry and things really start to heat up.
| 26 | 5 | "Sleeping With the Enemy" | March 3, 2011 | 0.82 |
Madison gets more than he bargained for when he lists the home of a short-tempered seller who's desperate for a sale. Josh Flagg's new client Candis Cayne hires him to find a hip venue for a gay bar in West Hollywood. Tempers flare when Madison learns about Josh Altman's date with his assistant Heather.
| 27 | 6 | "Billionaire Buyer" | March 8, 2011 | 1.18 |
When a billionaire client comes to town, Josh Altman is under the gun to find a lavish estate in less than 48 hours. Josh Flagg struggles to find a buyer for a sprawling Victorian on the outskirts of LA and Madison must deal with a hot-headed client who threatens to walk from a deal. Meanwhile, Josh Altman encourages Madison's assistant Heather to quit.
| 28 | 7 | "Going to the Dogs" | March 15, 2011 | 0.97 |
Madison must lease the high-end beach home of a tenant with six dogs, which makes showing the place a potential disaster and an angry seller challenges Josh Flagg's marketing strategy. Meanwhile, Josh Altman struggles to sell nine high-end lofts in Venice Beach and sparks fly when Madison accuses Josh Altman of trying to undermine his business.
| 29 | 8 | "Betrayal in the Real Estate Biz" | March 22, 2011 | 1.12 |
The tension is intense when Madison confronts Josh Altman about moving into his territory and Josh gets personal by encouraging Heather to leave Madison's business. Meanwhile, Josh Flagg gets ready to publish his new book and has second thoughts about revealing details from his personal life.
| 30 | 9 | "Good Buys and Goodbyes" | March 29, 2011 | 1.01 |
When a potential client shows Josh Altman his Hollywood Hills bachelor's den, Josh A. thinks he's found the house of his dreams and will stop at nothing to get the listing. Meanwhile, Madison gives Heather an ultimatum after finding out she's been interviewing at other offices and Josh Altman accuses Josh Flagg of ratting her out.

=== Season 5 (2012) ===
| No. overall | No. in season | Title | Original release date | U.S. viewers (millions) |
|---|---|---|---|---|
| 31 | 1 | "Ballooning Assets" | June 6, 2012 | 0.89 |
Josh Altman attempts to sell a multi-million dollar home owned by an eccentric inventor who wants to fly. Meanwhile over in Malibu, Madison helps a colleague sell her ill-tempered ex-husband's stunning lakeside home. Flying high, Josh Flagg meets a client at "rooftop yoga" and nabs a listing for a prized Beverly Hills estate.
| 32 | 2 | "Betrayal Between Brokers" | June 13, 2012 | 0.96 |
As Heather's relationship with Josh Altman heats up, it begins to interfere with her work. Madison accuses Heather of sabotaging his business and takes swift action against her. With his heart on this sleeve and tempers flaring, Josh Altman vows to make Madison pay for messing with his girl. In Beverly Hills, a young socialite and rising fashion star turns to Josh Flagg to help her find a high-end hideout.
| 33 | 3 | "I Got the Listing and I Got the Girl" | June 20, 2012 | 0.84 |
With a thorn in his side, Madison decides to confront Heather and Josh Altman by crashing his brokers open at a plush Beverly Hills penthouse. In tranquil waters, Josh Flagg's Grandmother Edith bonds with his client, a socialite.
| 34 | 4 | "Let's (Not) Make a Deal" | June 27, 2012 | 0.91 |
With his work and personal life at a crossroads, Josh Altman's temper runs short causing him to lose a four-million-dollar listing. Eager to win his father's approval, Madison comes through with a brilliant idea to sell his family's home in Park City, Utah. Meanwhile, frustration runs deep for Josh Flagg when a major client threatens to back out of a deal.
| 35 | 5 | "No Crying in Real Estate" | July 11, 2012 | 0.84 |
The two Joshes are toughing out stormy weather on personal and professional fronts; A close family friend has sad news for Josh Flagg and with his tail between his legs, Josh Altman is desperate for a new listing. In Malibu, a developer sets Madison up for failure when he insists on showing his property during construction.
| 36 | 6 | "Sacked by the Money Man" | July 18, 2012 | 1.01 |
With pro-football player Orlando Scandrick of the Dallas Cowboys as his client, Josh Altman gets blindsided by Orlando’s business manager. Meanwhile, Josh Flagg struggles to sell an ultra-contemporary party palace and his boyfriend Colton delivers some startling news. Tensions are high when Madison’s assistant Heather makes an unexpected demand.
| 37 | 7 | "Broker Blowout" | July 25, 2012 | 1.26 |
Madison’s broker’s open gets rowdy when Josh Altman and Heather make a scene. Meanwhile, Josh Altman makes a dangerous play negotiating a deal for his pro-football player client Orlando Scandrick. Josh Flagg must get in touch with his nurturing side when he is forced to babysit.
| 38 | 8 | "Shark Out of Water" | August 1, 2012 | 0.97 |
Life's a bitch for Josh Altman when he travels outside his territory and misjudges a new client. Madison must fight off competing brokers to win over a client. Josh Flagg's slam-dunk Rodeo Drive listing is fraught with complications.
| 39 | 9 | "Big Listings, Big Losses" | August 8, 2012 | 0.97 |
Josh Flagg balks at a listing two hours away, prompting Grandma Edith to lecture him on work ethic; Madison suffers a devastating personal loss; With a buyer and seller digging in their heels, Josh Altman is headed towards failure.
| 40 | 10 | "Closing Deals and Opening Doors" | August 15, 2012 | 1.58 |
Josh and Colton stun Josh's parents with some news about their family. Still grieving from his loss, Madison is skeptical when Heather reaches out to him. Josh Altman makes an eight-digit sale and he and Heather take their relationship to the next level.

=== Season 6 (2013) ===
| No. overall | No. in season | Title | Original release date | U.S. viewers (millions) |
|---|---|---|---|---|
| 41 | 1 | "Unfinished Business" | August 7, 2013 | 1.26 |
The real estate agents are back and the market is on fire. When Josh Altman takes on a sexy listing in the Hollywood Hills, he persuades one of his most important clients to take a huge risk. Meanwhile, Madison helps pro hockey player Sheldon Souray, sell his multi-million-dollar off-season party pad. Both Josh Altman and Madison converge at a brokers open for Josh Flagg's 14-million-dollar listing and its obvious there is unfinished business between the three of them.
| 42 | 2 | "Last Laugh" | August 14, 2013 | 1.34 |
Josh Altman and Josh Flagg come head to head when Altman makes an insulting lowball offer on Flagg’s listing. With his eyes on the prize, Flagg gets a much bigger offer and makes sure Altman knows who is boss. Over in Malibu, Madison has his hands full with two precocious twins after their mother reaches out to him after being burned by another realtor. To unload from work, Madison finds time to tend to his new love interest Marcos.
| 43 | 3 | "Dire Contingencies" | August 21, 2013 | 1.35 |
On the brink of the biggest deal of his career, Josh Altman is out to break his own record. But when his ego gets in the way of closing the deal, he jeopardizes his relationship with the other agent when she learns some shocking news about the sale. Meanwhile, Madison is having fun in the sun as he shops for a Texas couple who is ready to lay down some serious cash for a second home on the beach. Josh Flagg mentors a junior agent by helping him sell his parents' home. It's the young agent's first listing and he needs expert help.
| 44 | 4 | "Third Degree Burn" | August 28, 2013 | 1.13 |
The sky is the limit as Madison decides to expand his business outside Malibu. He comes to realize that afar from the ocean, lays a familiar face in wait. When Madison takes his clients to a listing in Beverly Hills, his former assistant, Heather is the listing agent on the property. Meanwhile, Josh Flagg takes on a client who refuses to sell his property without interrogating the potential buyer first making it difficult to seal the deal. It's sibling rivalry of epic proportions when Josh Altman and his brother Matt take competition to a whole new level and co-list a ten-million-dollar estate, still under construction.
| 45 | 5 | "It's Personal!" | September 4, 2013 | 1.21 |
After closing a deal on the mega-property Josh Altman co-listed with his brother Matthew, the duo decides to partner up, thus forming the Altman Brothers. It's a blast from the past when Josh Flagg takes on a listing for a high school friend's parents. Eager to show that a lot has changed, he is determined to show he is not the same outcast he was. As an agent, you must be willing to go the extra mile to get a listing sold. Madison proves that point when he jumps through hoops to sell a property which involves coyote urine and a surveillance camera.
| 46 | 6 | "Trouble in Paradise" | September 11, 2013 | 1.00 |
Josh Altman does some major Hollywood-style schmoozing when trying to move a spectacular seven-story party pad in the Hollywood Hills. On the personal front, Heather is devastated when Josh Altman gives her some hurtful news. Meanwhile, Josh Flagg wins over a potential buyer by finding the way to her heart. Over in Malibu, the ocean side view may not help his current listing; a half-built house on a barren ten-acre property for that is four and a half million dollars. Can Madison paint a more picturesque view than what's in front of him to get the property sold? Madison's love interest Marco is leaving for Mexico in two weeks, leaving Madison to make some life-changing decisions.
| 47 | 7 | "The Battle of Malibu" | September 18, 2013 | 1.14 |
After guaranteeing a long-time client he can sell her dated condo in one week, Josh Flagg enlists the help of his multi-lingual grandmother, Edith, to reach out to potential international buyers. The real estate world gets a little smaller when Madison and Josh Altman both have clients interested in the same two houses on the same street in Malibu. When Josh Altman initiates a bidding war, the gloves come off and there is a side of Madison that no one ever sees coming.
| 48 | 8 | "All Overboard" | September 25, 2013 | 0.99 |
When Josh Altman and his brother Matt take on a listing that looks more like a cruise-liner than a home, it's a hard sell. To make matters worse, the owner does not make listing the property any easier. Madison hopes to seal the deal when he gets a second chance on a listing he was unable to sell 18 months ago. Much to his chagrin, Josh Flagg is asked to find a house in "The Valley" for a good friend. Meanwhile, Josh Altman makes a stunning announcement and the relationship between Madison and Marcos takes a surprising turn.
| 49 | 9 | "Mexican Retreat" | October 2, 2013 | 1.32 |
The Altman brothers are thrilled to get a spectacular listing in Brentwood but the seller insists on having a security guard on the premises whenever they show the property. Josh Altman is horrified when his live-in girlfriend Heather co-lists a Malibu property with his nemesis, Josh Flagg. Meanwhile, Marcos invites Madison to Mexico to meet with developers at a luxury resort community where villas rent for up to $6,000 per night.
| 50 | 10 | "Madison v. Heather (Again!)" | October 9, 2013 | 1.28 |
When Madison lists an all glass property perched on a bluff that he calls "The Jewel Box," he gets an offer that he may not be able to refuse. Josh Flagg's Malibu co-listing with Heather heats up when Madison shows up at the brokers open and goes off on Heather. On the home front, Josh Flagg decides to sell his condo, which opens a serious can of worms between him and his partner Colton. Josh Altman is hired by a longtime client who has painstakingly restored a Spanish-style home. In his attempt to market the authenticity of the property, he is in for a surprise.
| 51 | 11 | "This Means War!" | October 16, 2013 | 1.48 |
Josh Flagg accuses Josh Altman of client poaching when he learns that Altman is working with his former drama camp counselor. Wanting to have the last say about the issue, Josh Flagg finds a way to retaliate without breaching his ethics. With his love life in shambles, Madison buries himself in his work. He holds an exclusive charity event for Malibu's finest at a jaw-dropping estate.
| 52 | 12 | "Love Conquers" | October 23, 2013 | 1.73 |
As Josh Flagg searches for a new home after selling his condo, he's faced with an ultimatum from Colton. Over in Malibu, Madison nails a six-million-dollar property in that is mid-construction. However when the money runs out, the property almost slips through his fingers. While marketing a 10-million-dollar villa in Beverly Hills Josh Altman targets high-rolling international buyers with an over-the-top hookah party. Meanwhile, Josh Altman takes a big step by making a decision that will change his life forever.

=== Season 7 (2014) ===
| No. overall | No. in season | Title | Original release date | U.S. viewers (millions) |
|---|---|---|---|---|
| 53 | 1 | "The Lads Take L.A." | August 20, 2014 | 0.99 |
With inventory low and demand high, the Los Angeles market is blazing hot and these agents are working hard to stay one sale ahead of their competition. While Josh Altman nabs a listing that every agent in town wanted, dynamic British duo David Parnes and James Harris continue to encroach on his territory. Josh Flagg lists a $9.4 million mansion in Bel Air Crest.
| 54 | 2 | "English Beat Down" | August 27, 2014 | 0.91 |
James and David crash Josh Altman's Broker's Open House for the listing they lost to him. The duo also lands the largest listing of their careers -- a $48 million estate. Josh Flagg sells his Bel Air Crest listing despite the fact his client cannot contain herself during the negotiation.
| 55 | 3 | "Real Estate on Wheels" | September 3, 2014 | 1.01 |
After taking a hard fall, Josh Flagg tries to find his good friend an investment property all while in agonizing pain. Josh Altman loses a coveted listing in the Hollywood Hills, but devises a brilliant plan to get it back. James and David continue to show their $48 million listing.
| 56 | 4 | "Royally Sucked" | September 10, 2014 | 1.25 |
While showing a Hollywood Hills estate, David and James cross paths with an infamous ne'er-do-well who brought shame on the Royal Family. Josh Flagg finds himself caught in the middle of close family friends who are at odds over the type of home they want to purchase. With inventory at an all-time low, Josh Altman's assistant, Mikey, goes undercover to snag a listing.
| 57 | 5 | "Flagg vs. Serhant" | September 17, 2014 | 1.21 |
Josh Flagg gets the better of Million Dollar Listing New York real estate agent Ryan Serhant when Ryan's client makes an offer on Flagg's flip property. When Josh Altman double-ends a deal with his brother, he must come to terms with his lifelong competition with Matt. Heather and Josh meet with a wedding planner who's baffled by their unpreparedness.
| 58 | 6 | "Hard Cold Cash" | September 24, 2014 | 1.01 |
When Josh Altman's client goes borderline ballistic during a negotiation, he has to stash the other agent in a freezer. Hip hop artist Tyga checks out David and James' ultimate bachelor pad in the Hollywood Hills, which happens to be across the street from Altman's house. Meanwhile, Josh Flagg goes back in time in order to sell a 1919 Beverly Hills tear-down that cannot be torn down.
| 59 | 7 | "There Goes the Neighborhood" | October 1, 2014 | 1.16 |
David makes a rash promise to a client without first consulting James, which could ultimately cost them the listing. Josh Altman snags a similar listing just blocks away from the Brits and the competition is anything but neighborly, especially when Heather has clients interested in both properties. Josh Flagg is stunned and saddened when Colton shows him the progress he's made remodeling his parents' house and childhood home. He also goes against everything he believes in after taking on a fickle client.
| 60 | 8 | "All Business, No Pleasure" | October 8, 2014 | 1.18 |
Josh Altman tries to find the perfect home for a famous street artist, who insists on going to every showing incognito. Josh Flagg worries about Grandma Edith's declining health before leaving for his annual Hamptons vacation. James and David go above and beyond to prove they're not the party boys they used to be in order to help old friends from London sell their Los Feliz home.
| 61 | 9 | "Realty Bites" | October 15, 2014 | 1.49 |
After being hired by a hard-nosed client who used to be a top real estate agent, James and David come up with a brilliant strategy to impress him. Josh Flagg is frustrated when he gets the listing for one of his favorite properties only to find out that other agents don't share his appreciation for it. Josh Altman lands the most prestigious listing of his career. The victory is short-lived as his personal life begins to crumble.
| 62 | 10 | "Million Dollar Frisking" | October 22, 2014 | 1.20 |
Josh Altman and his brother Matt meet with an international client demanding they find the perfect Beverly Hills getaway in just two days. Meanwhile, Altman is trying to keep his relationship with Heather from falling apart. As Edith's health continues to decline, Josh Flagg finds himself in crisis mode. One of James and David’s biggest clients is counting on them to find an LA residence that meets his very specific requirements.
| 63 | 11 | "Circling the Waters" | October 29, 2014 | 1.31 |
When Josh Altman's idol, Daymond John of Shark Tank fame, hires him to find commercial space for his West Coast headquarters, Altman moves his relationship with Heather to the back burner once again. David and James put it all on the line when they coax a prolific developer and his wife to sell their newly built dream house for $12,995,000. After the lady of the house gets cold feet, David makes a promise he may not be able to deliver on. Meanwhile, Josh Flagg is closing and opening deals with his usual ease, but real estate is the last thing on his mind when his personal life is shattered.
| 64 | 12 | "Crossroads" | November 5, 2014 | 1.28 |
A $13-million listing in Laguna Beach forces the Brits to sink-or-swim in a new territory. But they are buoyed by a surprise visit from a familiar face. Still reeling from the devastating loss of his grandmother, Josh Flagg struggles to stay focused on a new listing for one of Edith's friends. Josh Altman finds himself at a major cross-road: choosing to pursue a life-consuming $100-million listing, the biggest of his career, or spending more time with Heather to help mend their relationship.

=== Season 8 (2015) ===
| No. overall | No. in season | Title | Original release date | U.S. viewers (millions) |
|---|---|---|---|---|
| 65 | 1 | "Seller's Dream, Agent's Nightmare" | September 2, 2015 | 1.04 |
The four brokers are back to tackle the booming Los Angeles real estate market that has transformed into a seller’s paradise. After the loss of his beloved grandmother, Josh Flagg is determined to stay on top, vying for an $8 million listing from a long lost high school “friend.” With big life changes and under pressure to perform at work, Josh Altman promises a busy young millionaire that he will find him the perfect house in just one day. British transplants James Harris and David Parnes get creative to sell a $5.75 million hillside modern. And when the competitive real estate agents cross paths, old rivalries surface with new intensity.
| 66 | 2 | "Dinner Party Disaster" | September 9, 2015 | 0.94 |
James and David’s exclusive dinner party takes an explosive turn when Josh Altman and James have it out on the rooftop. The Brits’ partnership hits turbulent waters as the deadline on their listing looms. Josh Altman’s search for the perfect house for a hard-to-please client continues, but his client’s patience is wearing thin. Josh Flagg convinces boyfriend Colton it's time to move on from their Sunset Strip home and reap a profit in the process.
| 67 | 3 | "The Upside of Teardowns" | September 16, 2015 | 0.79 |
Still sore from their fallout, David keeps James out of a deal with a mystery client who could turn their fortunes around, but only if the Brits can get their partnership back on track. Josh Flagg tries to unload a stale teardown property in the exclusive Trousdale Estates neighborhood in Beverly Hills. Josh Altman balances his work and personal life as he tries to win over a new client, all while his visiting parents put the pressure on him and Heather to have children.
| 68 | 4 | "Best on the Block" | September 23, 2015 | 0.80 |
The Brits list a zen party pad, but their wild Burning Man-style brokers' open challenges David’s sobriety. Josh Altman faces off against an intimidating client as he tries to close a deal on the exclusive Mulholland Drive. Josh Flagg steps in to help two developers sell an overpriced modern home in West Hollywood, and also helps James get revenge on Josh Altman...in the most explosive way.
| 69 | 5 | "That's Neff'ed Up" | September 30, 2015 | 0.81 |
Josh Flagg gets creative in marketing an exceptional $20 million listing in Trousdale Estates in Beverly Hills. James and David finally gain access back into the Beachwood party pad, but not before hitting another speed bump with the seller. Meanwhile, Josh Altman puts pressure on himself to sell a dated house by famed architect Wallace Neff to a buyer that will return it to its former glory.
| 70 | 6 | "Knock Knock, Who's There?" | October 7, 2015 | 0.81 |
James and David are up for a luxury listing with a demanding client, but James’ family commitments get in the way. Josh Altman gets clever in an effort to increase the value of an overpriced estate in Los Feliz. And when the Brits and Josh Flagg decide to co-list a property together, Josh Altman pounces on the chance to get his revenge.
| 71 | 7 | "Karma's a Bitch" | October 14, 2015 | 0.85 |
Josh Altman’s prank on Josh Flagg during his open house with the Brits causes a confrontation that turns personal. James pulls off a sentimental surprise for his wife on their 5-year anniversary, while Josh Altman confesses a change of heart about his future with Heather. Josh Flagg stands to make triple commission on a property, if he doesn't lose his clients in the process.
| 72 | 8 | "Major League Listings" | October 21, 2015 | 0.97 |
James and David list the home of a sentimental seller, but when NBA star Kris Humphries shows interest, the Brits struggle to seal the deal. Josh Altman previews off-market listings to MLB's Brian Wilson, but his quirky demands throw Altman off his game. Josh Flagg takes a Midwesterner with a tiny budget on a quest to find the LA home of her dreams. And when Altman has to ask a good friend for a big favor, it becomes a game of major league hardball.
| 73 | 9 | "All Cash Chaos" | October 28, 2015 | 1.03 |
James works with Madison Hildebrand in Malibu to find a home for a young British millionaire with a fear of heights. Josh Flagg struggles to move on after losing his beloved grandmother, Edith. Josh Altman and The Brits engage in an epic negotiation that leaves actual money on the table.
| 74 | 10 | "Bait and Switch" | November 4, 2015 | 0.91 |
Josh Flagg is tempted with a prestige listing in the Pacific Palisades but first must find the seller a new home. Josh Altman’s biggest challenge on a modern Hollywood Hills party pad isn't his demanding Russian client, but the surprise appearance of Madison Hildebrand at his open house. Investor Zach Vella enlists James to take him property shopping for new hotel space on the Sunset Strip. James Harris gets David Parnes into hot water when he tries to convince Adrian to put their nearly complete dream home on the market.
| 75 | 11 | "The Hustler Hustle" | November 11, 2015 | 0.93 |
James finds himself across the table from publishing tycoon Larry Flynt as he negotiates the purchase of the iconic Sunset Strip Hustler building. Josh Altman gets caught in a vulnerable position when an offer comes in on Carman Crest at an inopportune time. David and Adrian make a major decision about their future. Josh Flagg thinks he's found the perfect beach house for his hard-to-please client, but negotiations threaten to derail the whole deal.
| 76 | 12 | "It's a Mad Mad Madison World" | November 18, 2015 | 1.09 |
Madison returns with a Malibu beachside listing that needs his help after sitting stale for a year. Josh Altman jumps in to support his fiancée Heather as she lists an entire condo building near Hancock Park that would be the biggest sale of her career. David and James list a teardown property so in demand amongst developers, it brings Flagg and Altman face to face in a battle over clients, properties, and who really is the number one agent in town.
| 77 | 13 | "Tower-ing Inferno" | December 2, 2015 | 1.05 |
Josh Altman and Josh Flagg have an explosive showdown at the Brits’ Tower Lane property. Madison works against a ticking clock to close the deal on his PCH listing. David enlists James’ help to deal with the emotional sale of his own home in Orlando. Josh Altman celebrates the launch of his book, but Heather shares some news that could change their lives forever.
| 78 | 14 | "Making Moves" | December 9, 2015 | 1.32 |
The results from Heather’s pregnancy test put things into perspective for Josh Altman. After months of waiting, James and David’s St. Ives listing is ready to hit the market, but tensions with the seller may cause them to walk away from the listing. Josh Flagg shifts his focus from business to a personal matter. And a nervous David heads off to Italy to pop the question to girlfriend Adrian.

=== Season 9 (2016) ===
| No. overall | No. in season | Title | Original release date | U.S. viewers (millions) |
|---|---|---|---|---|
| 79 | 1 | "The War of Real Estate" | October 6, 2016 | 0.88 |
| 80 | 2 | "Bye, Felicia" | October 13, 2016 | 0.92 |
| 81 | 3 | "Fuchsia My Life!" | October 20, 2016 | 0.83 |
| 82 | 4 | "Back on Market" | October 27, 2016 | 0.85 |
| 83 | 5 | "Montcalm and Carry On" | November 3, 2016 | 0.85 |
| 84 | 6 | "White Wedding Day" | November 10, 2016 | 0.99 |
| 85 | 7 | "Zeppo Marx the Spot" | November 17, 2016 | 0.99 |
| 86 | 8 | "Nightmare on Altman Street" | December 1, 2016 | 0.89 |
| 87 | 9 | "Turn & Burn" | December 8, 2016 | 0.93 |
| 88 | 10 | "Surf vs Turf" | December 15, 2016 | 0.87 |
| 89 | 11 | "Co-List from Hell" | December 22, 2016 | 0.90 |
| 90 | 12 | "Best and Final" | December 29, 2016 | 1.19 |

=== Season 10 (2017-18) ===
| No. overall | No. in season | Title | Original release date | U.S. viewers (millions) |
|---|---|---|---|---|
| 91 | 1 | "She's A Boss" | November 2, 2017 | 0.77 |
| 92 | 2 | "A Tantalizing Offer" | November 9, 2017 | 0.72 |
| 93 | 3 | "Unchartered Territory" | November 16, 2017 | 0.89 |
| 94 | 4 | "Hashtag Sell This Bitch!" | November 30, 2017 | 0.97 |
| 95 | 5 | "Two Tops Never Work" | December 7, 2017 | 0.93 |
| 96 | 6 | "Homewood's Where the Heart Is" | December 14, 2017 | 0.92 |
| 97 | 7 | "Who's Your Daddy?" | December 21, 2017 | 0.81 |
| 98 | 8 | "It Wasn't in My Budget!" | December 28, 2017 | 1.15 |
| 99 | 9 | "Mile High Club" | January 4, 2018 | 1.10 |
| 100 | 10 | "Keys to the Castle" | January 11, 2018 | 0.79 |
| 101 | 11 | "Love and Listings" | January 18, 2018 | 0.91 |
| 102 | 12 | "Unfinished Business" | January 25, 2018 | 1.01 |

=== Season 11 (2019) ===
| No. overall | No. in season | Title | Original release date | U.S. viewers |
|---|---|---|---|---|
| 103 | 1 | "The Struggle Is Real" | January 3, 2019 | 830,000 |
| 104 | 2 | "The Good Fight" | January 10, 2019 | 883,000 |
| 105 | 3 | "Won't You Be My Neighbor?" | January 17, 2019 | 935,000 |
| 106 | 4 | "Rumble in the 90210" | January 24, 2019 | 837,000 |
| 107 | 5 | "Send It to Viral" | January 31, 2019 | 846,000 |
| 108 | 6 | "Pony Up" | February 7, 2019 | 759,000 |
| 109 | 7 | "Failure to Launch" | February 14, 2019 | 773,000 |
| 110 | 8 | "Brother Dearest" | February 21, 2019 | 681,000 |
| 111 | 9 | "Hell or High Water" | February 28, 2019 | 786,000 |
| 112 | 10 | "Naked in the Backyard" | March 7, 2019 | 789,000 |
| 113 | 11 | "Dubai It" | March 21, 2019 | 891,000 |
| 114 | 12 | "Friend and Foe" | March 28, 2019 | 857,000 |

=== Season 12 (2020) ===
| No. overall | No. in season | Title | Original release date | U.S. viewers (millions) |
|---|---|---|---|---|
| 115 | 1 | "Altman and Flagg's Co-List" | June 16, 2020 | 0.86 |
| 116 | 2 | "Razor's Edge" | June 23, 2020 | 0.96 |
| 117 | 3 | "Rock and a Hard Price" | June 30, 2020 | 0.84 |
| 118 | 4 | "Altman Versus Fredrik" | July 7, 2020 | 1.00 |
| 119 | 5 | "Storm the Castle" | July 14, 2020 | 0.86 |
| 120 | 6 | "Ze Plane, Ze Plane!" | July 21, 2020 | 1.02 |
| 121 | 7 | "Flagg It or Bag It" | July 28, 2020 | 0.96 |
| 122 | 8 | "24 Hours or Else" | August 4, 2020 | 1.01 |
| 123 | 9 | "Swedish Invasion" | August 11, 2020 | 1.00 |
| 124 | 10 | "Medieval Time Machine" | August 18, 2020 | 0.98 |
| 125 | 11 | "One for the 'Gram" | August 25, 2020 | 0.99 |
| 126 | 12 | "Hollywood Royalty" | September 1, 2020 | 1.06 |

=== Season 13 (2021) ===
| No. overall | No. in season | Title | Original release date | U.S. viewers |
|---|---|---|---|---|
| 127 | 1 | "A Swedish Soirée" | September 2, 2021 | 660,000 |
| 128 | 2 | "Counter Offer Knock Down" | September 9, 2021 | 636,000 |
| 129 | 3 | "Orange You Glad It's a Co-List?" | September 16, 2021 | 722,000 |
| 130 | 4 | "House of Drago" | September 23, 2021 | 563,000 |
| 131 | 5 | "The House That Thighmaster Built" | September 30, 2021 | 618,000 |
| 132 | 6 | "Two's Company, Three's a Crowd" | October 7, 2021 | 664,000 |
| 133 | 7 | "The Laws of Distraction" | October 21, 2021 | 568,000 |
| 134 | 8 | "Have a Cookie and Relax" | October 28, 2021 | 712,000 |
| 135 | 9 | "Gate Code Shakedown" | November 4, 2021 | 715,000 |
| 136 | 10 | "Look Ma', We Made It" | November 11, 2021 | 772,000 |
| 137 | 11 | "9021 No!" | November 18, 2021 | 670,000 |
| 138 | 12 | "Trouble in the OC" | December 2, 2021 | 574,000 |
| 139 | 13 | "The Great British Cook-Off" | December 9, 2021 | 655,000 |
| 140 | 14 | "The One with the 7 Foot Marilyn" | December 16, 2021 | 724,000 |

=== Josh & Josh (2021-22) ===
| No. overall | No. in season | Title | Original release date | U.S. viewers |
|---|---|---|---|---|
| 141 | 1 | "The Odd Couple" | December 23, 2021 | 610,000 |
| 142 | 2 | "Rocky Mountain Buy" | December 30, 2021 | 559,000 |
| 143 | 3 | "Sour Grapes" | January 6, 2022 | 708,000 |
| 144 | 4 | "On the Waterfront" | January 13, 2022 | 804,000 |

=== Season 14 (2022-23) ===
| No. overall | No. in season | Title | Original release date | U.S. viewers |
|---|---|---|---|---|
| 145 | 1 | "Just the Three of Us" | December 8, 2022 | 404,000 |
| 146 | 2 | "The First Husband's Club" | December 15, 2022 | 459,000 |
| 147 | 3 | "A Game of Cat and House" | December 22, 2022 | 544,000 |
| 148 | 4 | "Gentlemen Prefer Blondes" | January 5, 2023 | 552,000 |
| 149 | 5 | "To Sell or Not to Sell" | January 12, 2023 | 588,000 |
| 150 | 6 | "The Rocky Hazen Picture Show" | January 19, 2023 | 583,000 |
| 151 | 7 | "Rate Hikes and Date Nights" | January 26, 2023 | 619,000 |
| 152 | 8 | "Breakin' Up Is Hard To Do" | February 2, 2023 | 599,000 |
| 153 | 9 | "Commission Omission" | February 9, 2023 | 634,000 |
| 154 | 10 | "Triple Threat" | February 16, 2023 | 567,000 |
| 155 | 11 | "Flagg and Loathing in Las Vegas" | February 23, 2023 | 646,000 |
| 156 | 12 | "To the Max" | March 2, 2023 | 619,000 |

=== Season 15 (2024) ===
| No. overall | No. in season | Title | Original release date | U.S. viewers |
|---|---|---|---|---|
| 157 | 1 | "Just When You Think You've Seen It All..." | July 10, 2024 | 534,000 |
| 158 | 2 | "I Hate to Say I Told You So" | July 17, 2024 | 487,000 |
| 159 | 3 | "Buyer's Remorse" | July 24, 2024 | 561,000 |
| 160 | 4 | "Know When to Walk Away" | July 31, 2024 | 504,000 |
| 161 | 5 | "A Tale of Two Listings" | August 7, 2024 | 495,000 |
| 162 | 6 | "No Deal Is Easy" | August 14, 2024 | 616,000 |
| 163 | 7 | "A Day at the Roxbury" | August 21, 2024 | 490,000 |
| 164 | 8 | "Mo' Mansions, Mo' Problems" | August 28, 2024 | 487,000 |
| 165 | 9 | "You Splooge, You Lose" | September 4, 2024 | 454,000 |
| 166 | 10 | "Ending on a High" | September 11, 2024 | 527,000 |
