= The Real Housewives of Orange County season 19 =

The Real Housewives of Orange County
- Season 19
- Promotional poster via Peacock
- Starring: Tamra Judge; Heather Dubrow; Shannon Storms Beador; Gina Kirschenheiter; Emily Simpson; Jennifer Pedranti; Katie Ginella
- No. of episodes: 20

Release
- Original network: Bravo
- Original release: July 10 – November 20, 2025

Season chronology
- ← Previous; Season 18 Next → Season 20

The nineteenth season of the American reality television series, The Real Housewives of Orange County, premiered on July 10, 2025, on Bravo and concluded on November 20, 2025. It was primarily filmed in Orange County, California. Its executive producers are Douglas Ross, Alex Baskin, Thomas Kelly, Brian McCarthy, Apryl Richards, Scott Dunlop and Andy Cohen.

The Real Housewives of Orange County focuses on the lives of Tamra Judge, Heather Dubrow, Shannon Storms Beador, Gina Kirschenheiter, Emily Simpson, Jennifer Pedranti and Katie Ginella, with Gretchen Rossi appearing as a friend of the housewives. This season marked Ginella's departure.

== Production and crew ==
On January 29, 2025, it was announced that Gretchen Rossi would return to the show as a friend of the housewives after a twelve year hiatus along with all of the housewives from the previous season.

In March 2025, Tamra Judge made a post on Instagram implying she quit the show. A week later, Judge was spotted filming again with Heather Dubrow.

In June 2025, it was announced the season would premiere on July 10, 2025. Former housewives Jo De La Rosa and Elizabeth Lyn Vargas made guest appearances during the season, as well as Million Dollar Listing Los Angeles cast members Josh Altman and Josh Flagg.

=== Reunion ===
A three-part reunion began airing on November 6, 2025, on Bravo, with subsequent parts airing on November 13 and November 20.

== Episodes ==
The Real Housewives of Orange County season 19 episodes
No. overall	No. in season	Title	Original release date	U.S. viewers (millions)
329	1	"Revolving Door of Lies"	July 10, 2025	0.52
330	2	"Old Faces, New Places"	July 17, 2025	0.51
331	3	"Knee Deep in Lies"	July 24, 2025	0.55
332	4	"Judge, Jury and Jenn"	July 31, 2025	0.55
333	5	"The Big Uneasy"	August 7, 2025	0.48
334	6	"What Voodoo You Do?"	August 14, 2025	0.48
335	7	"The Truth Will Not Set You Free"	August 21, 2025	0.55
336	8	"Truth Tellers & Lie Detectors"	August 28, 2025	0.61
337	9	"Life's a Beach... and Then You Cry"	September 4, 2025	0.58
338	10	"Whine or Champagne?"	September 11, 2025	0.54
339	11	"Loose Lips Sink Trips"	September 18, 2025	0.57
340	12	"Defense Is the Best Offense"	September 25, 2025	0.51
341	13	"Not So Funfetti"	October 2, 2025	0.55
342	14	"Hoedown Throwdown"	October 9, 2025	0.57
343	15	"Going Dutch"	October 16, 2025	0.54
344	16	"Tulip Service"	October 23, 2025	0.54
345	17	"A Source of Discontent"	October 30, 2025	0.58
346	18	"Reunion Part 1"	November 6, 2025	0.67
347	19	"Reunion Part 2"	November 13, 2025	0.56
348	20	"Reunion Part 3"	November 20, 2025	0.60
