= Heather Altman =

American real estate agent

- Born: Las Vegas, Nevada, U.S.
- Occupation: Real estate agent
- Television: Million Dollar Listing
- Spouse: Josh Altman (m. 2016)
- Children: 2

Heather Altman (née Bilyeu; in Las Vegas, Nevada) is an American real estate agent and reality television personality based in Los Angeles, California.

== Career ==
Altman has been a real estate agent since 2008, specializing in the luxury home sector. She is also known for her role on the Bravo reality television series Million Dollar Listing Los Angeles, where she appears with her husband, Josh Altman.

Her real estate career began in Nevada, where she obtained her license at the age of 17. She later moved to Los Angeles to work with the Madison Hildebrand and later the Altman Brothers real estate firm (Josh and Matt Altman).

== Personal life ==
Heather and Josh Altman married on April 2, 2016, and have two children.
