= The Century Towers =

Building in California, United States

Century Towers
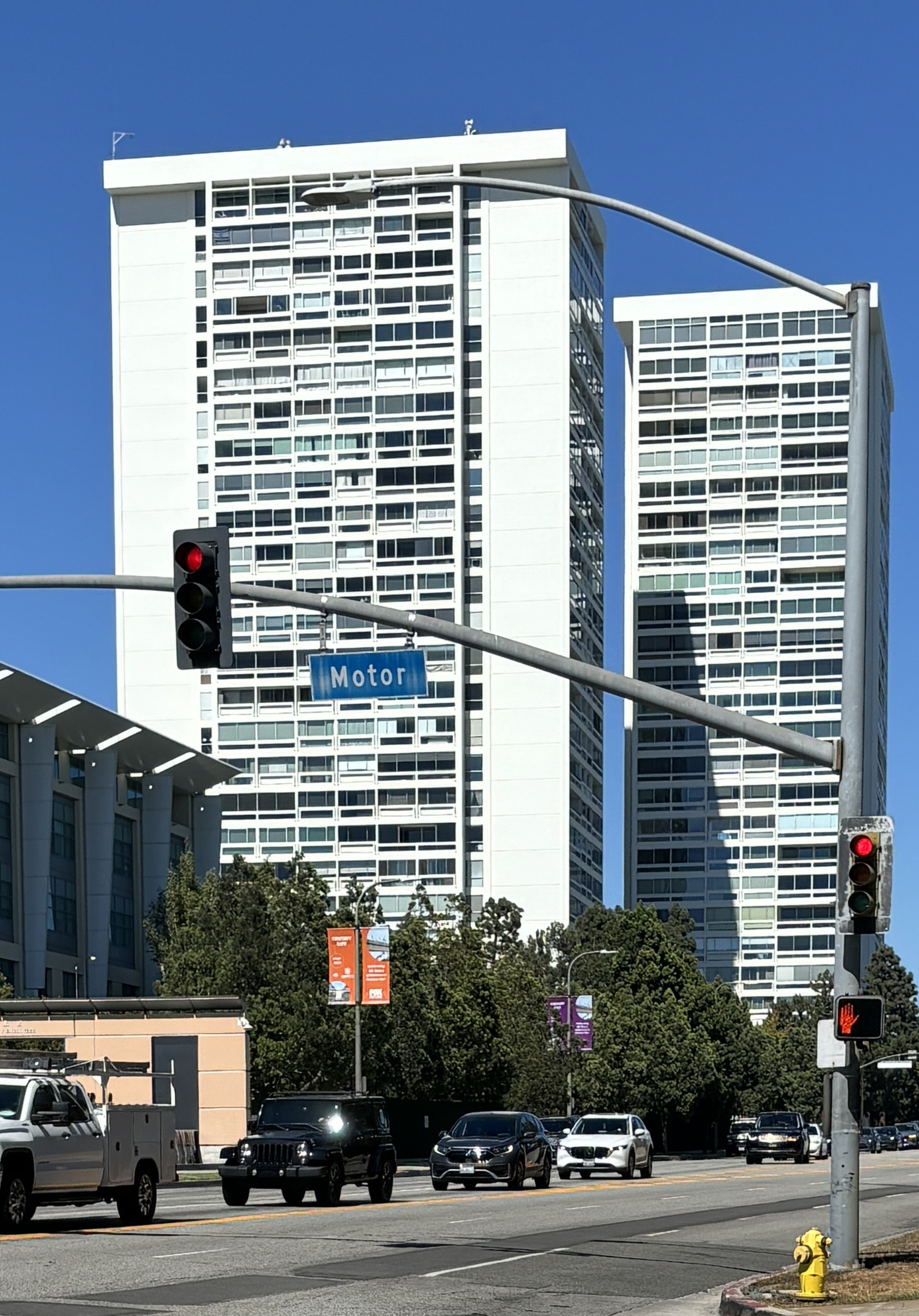
- The Century Towers in 2024
- Interactive map of the Century Towers area

General information
- Type: Residential
- Location: 2220 & 2222 Avenue of the Stars, Los Angeles, California
- Coordinates: 34°03′08″N 118°24′30″W
- Construction started: April 1963
- Completed: 1964

Technical details
- Floor count: 28

Design and construction
- Architect: I.M. Pei
- Developer: S. Jon Kreedman & Co.

Century Towers Residences are twin 28-story luxury condominium skyscrapers and the first residential project constructed in Century City, Los Angeles, in the U.S. state of California. The buildings were designed by I.M Pei and developed under the aegis of Alcoa Properties, located along the southern boundary of Century City on Avenue of the Stars.

== History ==
Built in 1964 by Alcoa, William Zeckendorf, and Welton Becket Associates, Century Towers was originally designed as apartments by architect I.M. Pei. Perhaps best known for the "Pyramide du Louvre," his landmark glass pyramid addition to the Louvre Museum (Paris, France), Pei brought his signature styling to the creation of the mid-century towers. The towers were converted to condominiums in 1973, by S. Jon Kreedman & Company. Located on 6 acres (24,000 m^{2}) of land (making it the largest luxury condominium property in Los Angeles), the towers host unobstructed 360° views of Los Angeles, the Hollywood Sign, Griffith Observatory and the Downtown Los Angeles skyline to the East and the Pacific Ocean to the West.

== Celebrity residents ==
Century Towers has been home to many celebrities, politicians, and notable figures over the years, including Michael Douglas, Josh Brolin, Catherine Zeta-Jones, Burt Lancaster, Diane Lane, Lana Turner, David Janssen, Jack Benny, Sean Connery, Albert Hammond, Giveon, Nicole Sassaman, Barbie, Diana Ross, Karen Carpenter (who purchased two condos and converted them into her own duplex in 1976), Edith Flagg and Josh Flagg, Ruth Handler (founder of Mattel) and Berry Gordy. David Janssen's widow Dani is known for an annual Oscar party thrown in her penthouse. The residences have also been featured on numerous episodes of Bravo's Million Dollar Listing Los Angeles.
