= Nest Seekers International =

Real estate company

- Type: Private
- Industry: Residential and Commercial Real Estate
- Founded: 2001
- Founder: Eddie Shapiro
- Headquarters: New York, NY, United States
- Number of locations: 80
- Area served: New York City, The Hamptons, Beverly Hills, London, Miami, Connecticut, New Jersey, Brooklyn, Long Island
- Key people: Eddie Shapiro (CEO), Shawn Elliott (President Of The Ultra Luxury Division)
- Number of employees: 2,000
- Website: www.nestseekers.com

Nest Seekers International is a full-service luxury residential and commercial brokerage firm. The company is headquartered in New York and London, with offices in the United States (Beverly Hills, Colorado, Connecticut, Gold Coast Long Island, The Hamptons, Miami, New Jersey, and Palm Beach), in Europe (Athens, Lisbon, and Milan), and in Asia (Seoul and Tel Aviv). It has affiliates throughout the world. In 2021, Nest Seekers International was the 7th-top grossing real estate firm in Manhattan.

== History ==
President and CEO Eddie Shapiro founded the company in 2001. As of 2026, the company has 80 offices and approximately 2,000 agents. In 2017, Nest Seekers International expanded to Gold Coast Long Island with the acquisition of Long Island-based Shawn Elliott Luxury Homes and Estates. In 2019, the firm represented the buyer and seller in the $94 million sale of the highly-publicized 924 Bel Air Road. The company soon after exclusively listed Casa Encantada for $225 million. In 2021, Nest Seekers transacted the most expensive sale in The Hamptons for that year, 70 Cobb Lane for $118.5 million. The firm also transacted the most expensive sales in The Hamptons for 2019, 263 Surfside Drive for $39.25 million and 950 Meadow Lane for $35 million. In 2020, the firm expanded to Colorado with the acquisition of a company in Breckenridge and announced plans to open in Vail and Aspen. In late 2021, Nest Seekers partnered with Marbella-based Drumelia Real Estate in a move to further expand into Spain.

== Media ==
Various brokers at Nest Seekers International are featured on real estate reality shows. Ryan Serhant is a featured agent on Bravo TV's program Million Dollar Listing New York, appearing on the show since its first season in 2012. Beverly Hills Regional Managing Director Marisa Zanuck was a cast member on the Bravo TV program Real Housewives of Beverly Hills. She has also appeared on HGTV's Selling LA and episodes of Bravo's Million Dollar Listing Los Angeles. Agent Caroline Grane appears in the eighth season of TV3's Swedish Hollywood Wives. In 2019, Nest Seekers International launched Nest Media, a stand-alone media company that produces and delivers real estate focused content. Nest Media partnered with DIGA Studios to jointly develop and produce unscripted real-estate lifestyle formats, partially funded by Nest Seekers, for TV and streaming distribution. In 2020, Million Dollar Beach House, a program produced by Nest Media and DIGA Studios, aired on Netflix starring Nest Seekers International agents J.B. Andreassi, Michael Fulfree, James "Jimmy" Giugliano, Noel Roberts and Peggy Zabakolas. In 2022, Selling The Hamptons, featuring Nest Seekers International agents in The Hamptons, aired on Discovery+ with plans for a future second season.

== Reception ==
The firm's listings have been featured in The New York Times, The Wall Street Journal, New York Post, New York Observer, the CBS series "Living Large" and the NBC series "Open House."

Nest Seekers International brokers are regularly featured as real estate experts in outlets such as The New York Times, CNN International, CNBC, Forbes, Bloomberg Businessweek, Business Insider and Glamour.

In May 2020 amid the COVID-19 pandemic, Nest Seekers realtor Jonathan Davis was accused of squatting in a Hamptons home located in Sag Harbor, New York. He is accused of causing extensive damage to the property, as well as taking advantage of rules put in place to protect vulnerable tenants from eviction, in order to reside in the home beyond the terms of the lease.
