= Dollar Beach =

Dollar Beach may refer to:

- Million Dollar Beach House, a reality streaming television series
- One Dollar Beach, East Timor
- Sand Dollar Beach, Big Sur, California, USA
- Two-Dollar Beach (Avaio Beach), American Samoa
