= Ronald Tutor =

American businessman

- Born: Ronald N. Tutor; 1940 or 1941 (age 85–86); Sherman Oaks, California, US
- Education: Van Nuys High School
- Alma mater: University of Southern California
- Occupation: Businessman
- Title: Former CEO, Tutor Perini; President, Tutor-Saliba Corporation
- Spouse: Alia Tutor
- Children: 5, including Tracy Tutor

Ronald N. Tutor (born 1940/1941) is an American businessman. He is executive chairman and former chief executive officer (CEO) of Tutor Perini, and president of the Tutor-Saliba Corporation.

== Early life ==
Ronald N. Tutor was born in Sherman Oaks, California, and is of Armenian descent. His father, Albert G. Tutor, founded A.G. Tutor Co., a real estate development company, in 1949. The company built "houses and small commercial buildings".

== Education ==
Tutor was educated at the Harvard School, now Harvard Westlake, and Van Nuys High School. He graduated from the University of Southern California in 1963.

== Career ==
Tutor started a career in construction shortly after graduation, working for Tutor-Saliba and A.G. Tutor Co. He formerly served as Chairman, CEO and President of Tutor Perini, and President of the Tutor-Perini Corporation. He received the United States Army Corps of Engineers National Contractor of the Year Award for Civil Works Projects in 1994. He now serves as Executive Chairman of Tutor-Perini.

=== Miramax investment ===
In 2010, Tutor was a lead investor in the $650 million purchase of Miramax Films from The Walt Disney Company, investing between US$35 million and US$50 million. The acquisition started with a lavish party that included Rob Lowe and Jamie-Lynn Sigler. In 2013, he sold his stake to the Qatar Investment Authority.

== Philanthropy ==
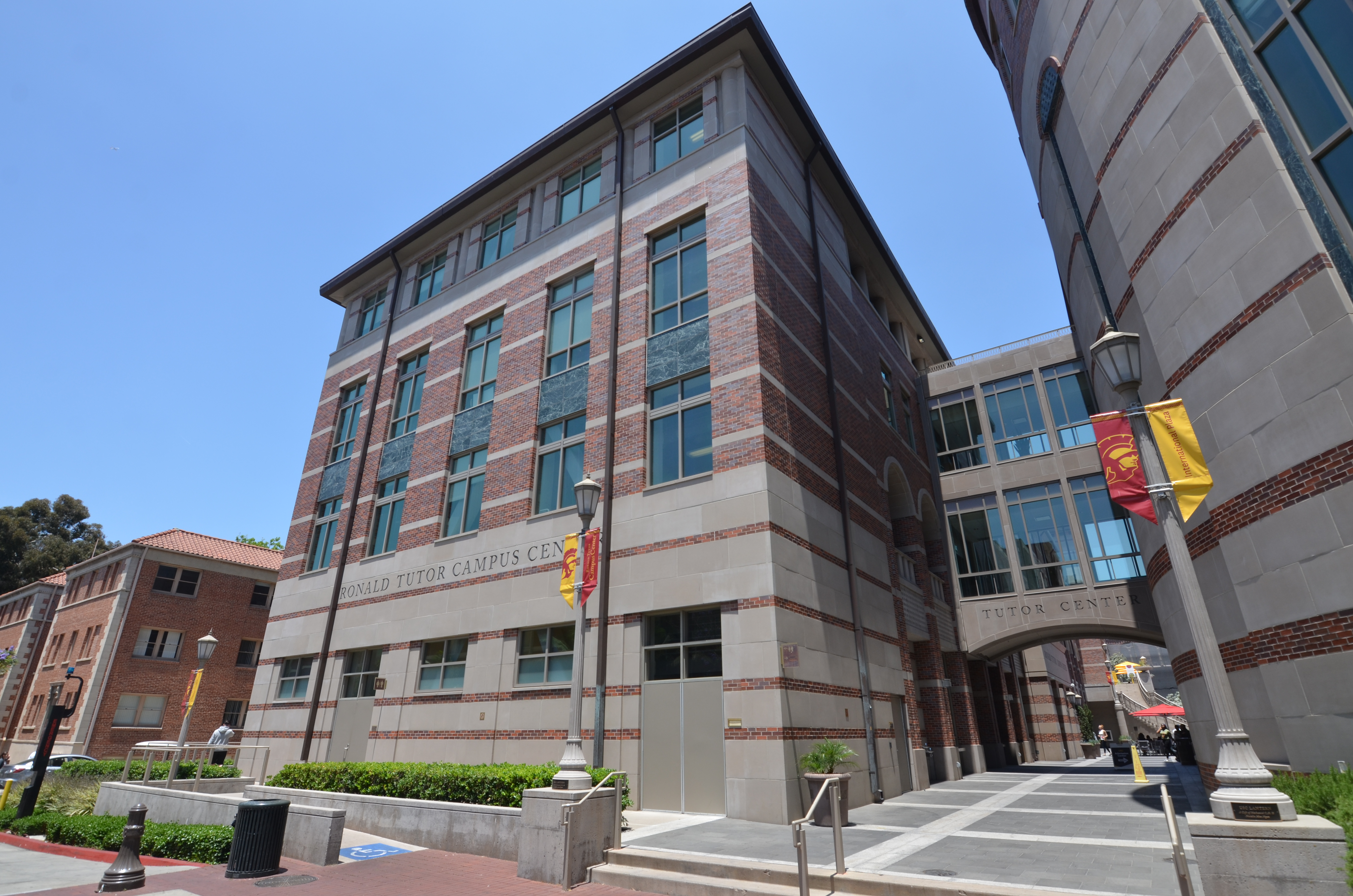
Ronald Tutor Campus Center pictured in University of Southern California, named in his honor

Tutor serves on the Board of Trustees of his alma mater, USC. Tutor gifted USC The Ronald Tutor Campus Center and the USC Viterbi School of Engineering’s Tutor Hall, which are named in his honor. He has received the Asa V. Call Alumni Achievement Award from USC. He donated US$2 million to the USC Institute of Armenian Studies in 2008. In 2014, his wife Alia endowed the Alia Tutor Chair in Reproductive Medicine at the Keck School of Medicine of USC. In 2022, his wife pledged $17.5 million to Columbia Law School to fund the redesign of the law school library, the largest single commitment in the school's history, though she subsequently reneged on her pledge in October of 2025.

== Personal life ==
Tutor has two sons with his wife, Alia, and three daughters from previous marriages. One of his daughters is Tracy Tutor, a main cast member on the real estate reality television program, Million Dollar Listing Los Angeles.
