= Edith Flagg =

American fashion designer (1919–2014)

- Born: Edith Faierstein; November 1, 1919; Vienna, Austria
- Died: August 13, 2014 (aged 94); Century City, California, US
- Occupations: Fashion designer, businesswoman, television personality, philanthropist
- Spouses: Hans Stein (died 1944); Eric Flagg (died 1999)
- Children: 1
- Relatives: Josh Flagg (grandson)

Edith Flagg (née Faierstein, also known as Feuerstein; November 1, 1919 – August 13, 2014) was an Austrian-born American fashion designer, fashion industry executive, and philanthropist. She was the first designer to import polyester as a fashion textile to America. In her later life, Flagg became known for her recurring role on the Bravo television program Million Dollar Listing Los Angeles with her grandson Josh Flagg.

== Early life ==
Edith Flagg was born Edith Faierstein to a Jewish family on November 1, 1919, in Vienna, Austria. She was raised in Galați, Romania, where her father worked as a photographer. At the age of 15 she returned to Vienna to study fashion and lived in Austria through her teenage years. When Hitler annexed Austria in 1938, she fled to the Netherlands with her boyfriend Hans Stein.

She married Hans Stein after they moved to the Netherlands in 1938. Instead of leaving the Netherlands after the German invasion, Flagg took the identity of the deceased Lydia Voskuilen. When she became pregnant with her son Michael, she hid the child in a sanitarium and posed as a nurse in order to visit him. Hans Stein was captured by Germans and sent to Auschwitz where he was murdered in 1944.

After Stein's death, Flagg worked within the Dutch underground resistance where she met her second husband Erich Simon Flegenheimer (later known as Eric Flagg), and after the war they married. Together they were responsible for saving several lives. She acted as a spy, swimming with Nazi soldiers and relaying what she overheard. Flagg reportedly killed two Nazis. Eric then moved to the United States and Edith and Michael lived on a kibbutz in Palestine, what would soon become Israel. Edith and Michael followed Eric to the United States and while Eric worked in New York, Edith and Michael moved to San Francisco and lived with Hans' parents. Edith, Eric and Michael then moved to Los Angeles in 1949.

== Career ==
Flagg started her career after arriving in New York in 1948 as a seamstress, progressing to design, then later in Los Angeles, California, working in the Garment District. She began her first line of dresses in 1956 with a $2,000 investment of her own savings. Her clothing-line "Edith Flagg, Inc." (1956–2000) manufactured in the United States from the 1950s until her retirement from the fashion industry in 2000. The brand was characterized by its wrinkle-resistant knitwear. As of 2012, the company reportedly afforded her a net worth of $100 million.

Flagg was the first person to import polyester to the United States and popularize it. She discovered a type of polyester called Crimplene which was being produced by Imperial Chemical Industries out of Leeds, England. The material was used for parachutes and military uniforms during World War II, resulting in a post-war surplus. Flagg found the new fabric while vacationing in Switzerland in the 1960s. She signed an exclusive advertising contract with DuPont to import Crimplene from England and popularize under the name polyester. She also imported the synthetic fabric Dacron. Edith Flagg, Inc. expanded from a successful dress manufacturing company in Los Angeles to an international design house with offices and showrooms in New York, Chicago, Atlanta, Cleveland, Los Angeles, San Francisco, Dallas, Charlotte and London, as well as a factory in Hong Kong.

She was an active contributor to California Apparel News and Women's Wear Daily in a weekly column titled "By the Way." Later, she often appeared on the television show Million Dollar Listing Los Angeles to offer business advice to her grandson, Josh Flagg. When Josh was fourteen, he wrote A Simple Girl: Stories My Grandmother Told Me, a book about her survival during World War II and her career. The book was published in 2009, prior to the show.

== Philanthropy ==
She was a donor to the United Jewish Welfare Fund, a Jewish non-profit organization, and the City of Hope, a private hospital in California.

Flagg retired in 2000 to concentrate on her philanthropy, focusing on Jewish and medical causes. She was a donor to the United Jewish Welfare Fund, a Jewish non-profit organization, and the City of Hope, a private hospital in California of which she and her husband were also board members. Proceeds from her biography A Simple Girl: Stories My Grandmother Told Me were donated to the Jewish Federation. Flagg and her husband were the recipients of multiple awards from the National Conference of Christians and Jews and The United Jewish Welfare Fund.

== Personal life ==
Flagg spoke Yiddish, Hebrew, Romanian, English, French, German and Dutch. She resided in a penthouse in The Century Towers on the Avenue of the Stars, Century City in Los Angeles, which she and her husband purchased from Jack Benny in 1976 for the highest price recorded for a condominium in Los Angeles up to that date.

== Death ==
She died on August 13, 2014, in her penthouse in Century City of natural causes. She was ninety-four years old. She was buried at the Hillside Memorial Park Cemetery, a Jewish cemetery in Culver City, California, and the reception took place at the Hillcrest Country Club.
