= Luis D. Ortiz =

Puerto Rican businessman

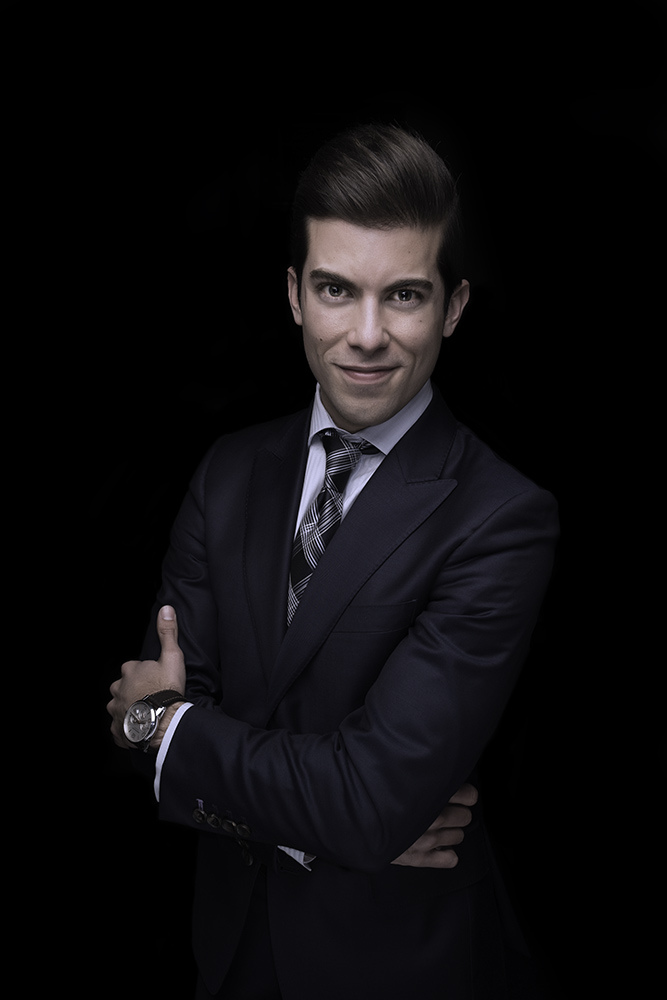
- Born: November 13, 1986 (age 40); Guaynabo, Puerto Rico
- Education: New York Film Academy
- Occupations: Real estate salesperson Reality television personality
- Children: 1

Luis D. Ortiz (born November 13, 1986) is a licensed real estate salesperson who worked for Douglas Elliman. Ortiz co-starred in the Bravo reality television series Million Dollar Listing New York, alongside Fredrik Eklund and Ryan Serhant, who remained from the prior season, and has continued with Eklund and Serhant to subsequent seasons.

== Early life ==
Ortiz was born in Guaynabo, Puerto Rico. He grew up in Guaynabo with his mother, father, and twin brother, Daniel. He and his twin brother left Puerto Rico when they were 16 years old, leaving only a note to say they had gone to Florida, infuriating their mother.

== Film ==
In 2006, Ortiz moved to New York City to study film direction at the New York Film Academy, where he completed the Director's Program. Upon moving to New York, Ortiz lived in a Jewish community. At the age of 19, he directed and produced Amália, his first film, which won Best Direction in the Puerto Rico Film Festival in 2007. He came back to New York in 2008 to make a second film. Ortiz sought $15,000 from New York restaurants to fund another film and, in one night, raised $9,000. The movie was titled The Theater of the Absurd, but he did not like it so he decided not to show it.

== Real estate career ==
Ortiz began his career in real estate selling rentals. Ortiz spoke of "bait and switch" practices, saying, "we had the bait and switch. Everyone had it but I was always very honest with people when they called me. I needed to feed myself. Had [the listings] been legitimate, I would probably never have gotten any calls."

Ortiz had previously worked at brokerages such as Synergy and Prodigy Network. Ortiz was fired by Keller Williams Realty during filming, as they felt that Million Dollar Listing New York was not in line with the Keller Williams’ NYC brand. Before joining New York’s largest residential real estate brokerage firm, Douglas Elliman, Ortiz was a vice president of Keller Williams NYC. On August 7, 2013, Douglas Elliman announced that Ortiz joined the firm which also employs his Million Dollar Listing New York reality television co-star, Fredrik Eklund. At Douglas Elliman, he started his own real estate group - Ortiz & Co.

In July 2016, on the season finale of Season 5 of Million Dollar Listing New York, Ortiz announced he was getting out of the real estate business in order to pursue other things. After leaving Million Dollar Listing New York, Ortiz fell in love with his girlfriend, Nikita. After their break-up, Ortiz experienced depression and ultimately decided to return to New York City.

Ortiz announced on his 30th birthday that he would be returning to real estate as a principal in property development. After returning, Ortiz began working at Douglas Elliman and joined the 8th season of Million Dollar Listing New York.

=== Million Dollar Listing New York ===
Ortiz was one of three New York City brokers starring in Bravo's Million Dollar Listing New York seasons two through five. Ortiz rejoined the cast for season 8. The 8th season premiered August 1, 2019.

=== New York Department of State investigation ===
The second season of Million Dollar Listing New York showed Ortiz presented photoshopped pictures of hardwood floors and new marble counter-tops, and stainless-steel appliances into promotional pictures of 27 Downing Street: "If I put the real photos out there, not a single person will ever come inside," he reasoned. While the photos were not actually used for the listing, he nonetheless "sent the fake photos in an email blast to top brokers." The New York Department of State, which regulates the real estate brokerage industry, investigated the listing.

In his blog on the Million Dollar Listing New York website, Ortiz said he learned from the error and never to fall short of his beliefs. Ortiz said he got overexcited and wrote, "I tried my best to get people through the door as fast as possible that I didn't give myself a chance to slow down and evaluate the situation. I have learned that sometimes slowing down is the best way to move faster."

== Personal life ==
In 2013, Ortiz was listed as number 19 on Us Weekly's Most Stylish New Yorker list.

Ortiz formerly resided in Battery Park City near Goldman Sachs, where he had views of the Statue of Liberty and the Hudson River. In 2014, he moved to Abington House in the northwestern corner of Chelsea, and currently resides in a new development in midtown Manhattan.

Ortiz and his ex-girlfriend, Nikita Singh, had a daughter in March 2019.

Ortiz returns to Puerto Rico three times every year.
