= Josh Altman =

Real estate agent (born 1979)

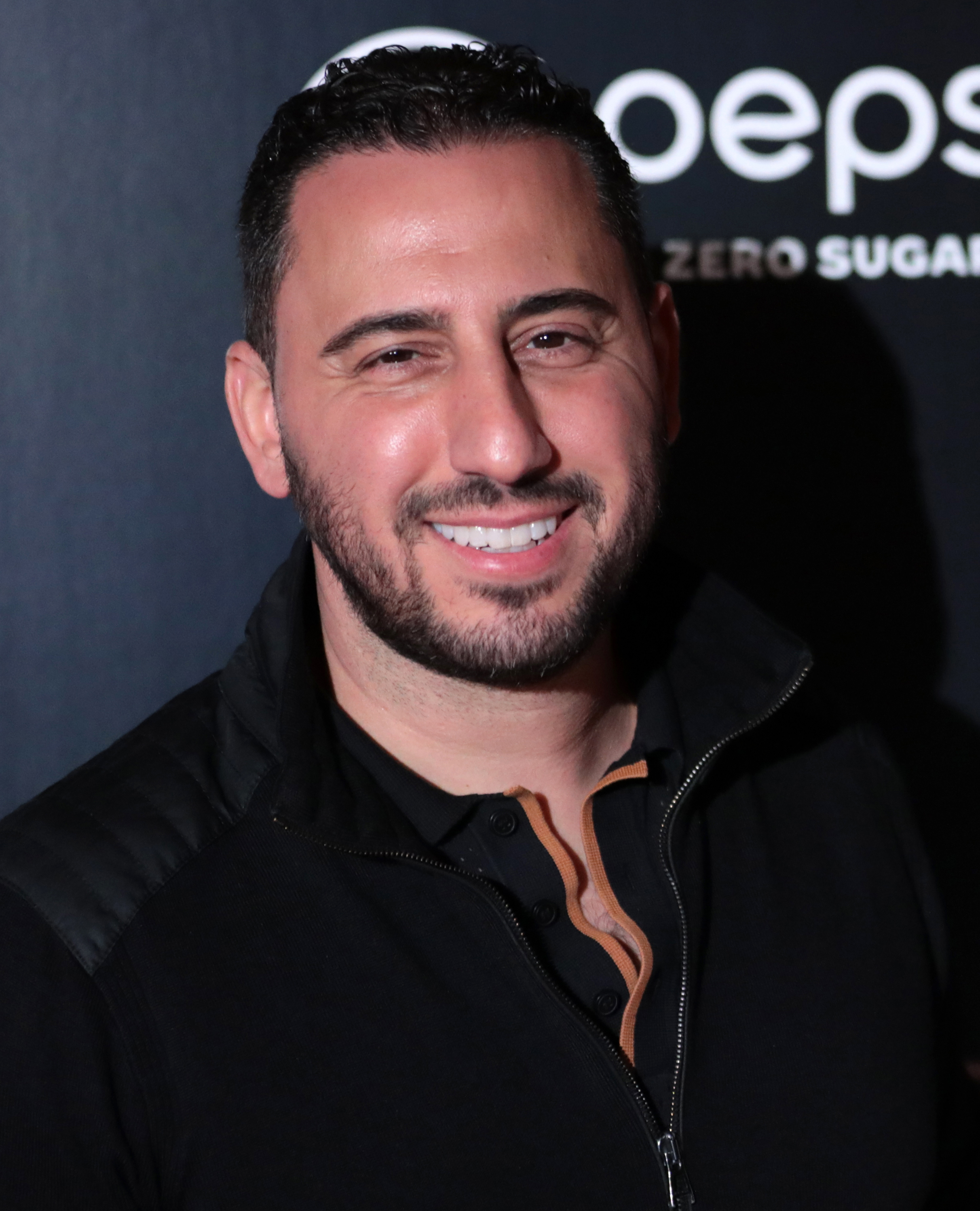
- Born: March 10, 1979 (age 47); Newton, Massachusetts, U.S.
- Education: Newton South High School; Syracuse University
- Occupations: Real estate agent; reality television personality
- Television: Million Dollar Listing
- Spouse: Heather Altman (m. 2016)
- Children: 2

Josh Altman (born March 10, 1979) is an American real estate agent and investor and reality television personality. He appears on the television show Million Dollar Listing, on the Bravo television network, alongside his wife Heather. He has also appeared on Keeping Up with the Kardashians and Giuliana and Bill on the E! network. Although similar in name to a television producer, Altman was not affiliated with the Netflix documentary Pandemic as claimed in some outlets.

== Early life ==
Josh Altman was born to a Jewish family on March 10, 1979, in Newton, Massachusetts. He had a Bar Mitzvah in both the US and in Israel. He has a brother, Matt Altman.

== Education ==
Altman attended Newton South High School from which he graduated in 1997. Among his high school graduating classmates were actors B. J. Novak and John Krasinski. After high school, Altman went to Syracuse University, where he received a degree in Speech Communications in 2001. As often mentioned by Altman on Million Dollar Listing episodes and elsewhere, he was a kicker for a brief period on the 1998 Syracuse Orangemen football team. He did not appear in any games.

== Career ==
After college, Altman moved to Los Angeles to pursue a career in real estate. He started as an investor and flipper. He then ran a real estate finance company for three years before joining his brother, Matt Altman, to form The Altman Brothers at the real estate brokerage, Hilton and Hyland. Altman specializes in the Platinum Triangle (Beverly Hills, Bel Air, and Holmby Hills) and the Sunset Strip and Hollywood Hills luxury housing market. He has represented entertainers, athletes, and international clientele.

In 2010, as part of The Altman Brothers, Altman sold $40,000,000 in real estate, followed by $60,000,000 in 2011. As of June 2012, he has sold $75,000,000. He is known for selling an Ocean Drive condo for $10.5 million, recorded as the highest sale in the history of Santa Monica for a condo. In 2010, he sold the former home of Norm Zada, who formerly published the magazine, Perfect 10, for $16,500,000, the sixth largest sale in Los Angeles county. In 2013, Altman was ranked #30 in national team sales by The Wall Street Journal with $200,000,000 in sales.

Altman consults with various media outlets including Wall Street Journal, and Boston Herald. Altman has been featured as a keynote celebrity speaker and host at engagements such as The Luxe Event in Seattle, Century 21 Allstars Sales Rally, 65th Annual Installation Luncheon for Downey Association of Realtors, Renter's Warehouse Event and hosted Terra Bella Presents "The American Dream".

As of 2021, Altman co-stars with Josh Flagg and Tracy Tutor, and formerly with Madison Hildebrand, on the reality television show Million Dollar Listing Los Angeles. He appeared for the first time during the fourth season in 2011. Altman returned to the show for the fifth season on May 6, 2012. The show follows three young real estate agents in Los Angeles as they sell high-end homes. He also appeared as a real estate agent on Keeping Up with the Kardashians and Giuliana and Bill.

Altman wrote the book It's Your Move: My Million Dollar Method for Taking Risks with Confidence and Succeeding at Work and Life. It was published by HarperCollins in 2015. In 2019 he wrote another book, The Altman Close.

In 2022, the Jewish Journal named Altman one of "The Top 10 Jewish Reality TV Stars of All Time."

== Real estate investing ==
Throughout his career, Altman has invested in real estate, generally flipping houses on a part-time basis. In August 2014, it was reported that Altman profited over one million dollars flipping just one property.
