= Herman Platt =

American businessman and philanthropist (1909–2005)

- Born: 1909
- Died: 2005 (aged 95–96)
- Occupation(s): Business executive and philanthropist
- Spouse: Margie Cerf Platt
- Father: Benjamin Platt

Herman Platt (1909–2005) was an American business executive and philanthropist.

== Biography ==
=== Early life ===
Hermann Platt was born in 1909. His father, Benjamin Platt, was the founder of the Platt Music Corporation and co-founder of the American Jewish University.

=== Career ===
He served as the Chief Executive of the American retail chain, Platt Music Corporation, until 1984 when he became Chairman of the Executive Committee.

=== Philanthropy ===
He was a key supporter of and fundraiser for Cedars-Sinai Medical Center, the Jewish Federation of Los Angeles, the Jewish Home for the Aging, the City of Hope National Medical Center and the UCLA Foundation. He was also the President of Vista del Mar Charities.

He served as the president of Sinai Temple from 1962 to 1964, after Edward Hyman. He was a co-founder of the Mount Sinai Memorial Park Cemetery. In 2005, Mount Sinai named its chapel and administrative buildings after Platt.

Together with his wife, he endowed the Marjorie and Herman Platt Gallery on the campus of the American Jewish University.

=== Personal life ===
In 1946, he married Margie (née Cerf) Platt. They had two sons, Kenneth Platt and Stephen Platt; and three daughters, Susan Platt Baggley, attorney Cynthia Platt Flagg, and producer Nancy Platt Arent Jacoby, as well as ten grandchildren. The Platt family has an archive at the UCLA library. The Benjamin Platt Papers (Collection 929) is located in the Department of Special Collections, Charles E. Young Research Library, University of California, Los Angeles.

=== Death ===
He died in 2005 of natural causes.
