= Tracy Tutor =

Real estate agent (born 1975)

- Born: August 11, 1975 (age 51); Hidden Hills, California, U.S.
- Occupations: Reality television personality; real estate agent; actress; author
- Known for: Million Dollar Listing Los Angeles; Exposé; No Vacancy
- Spouse: Jason Maltas (m. 2004; div. 2018)
- Children: 2
- Website: www.tracytutor.com

Tracy Tutor (born August 11, 1975) is an American real estate agent, author, actress, and reality television personality. She is a main cast member on the real estate reality television program, Million Dollar Listing Los Angeles, appearing in that capacity since its tenth season in 2017. She began her career as an actress, appearing in the late 1990s films Exposé and No Vacancy. In 2020, Tutor released her book Fear Is Just a Four-Letter Word: How to Develop the Unstoppable Confidence to Own Any Room, which was listed by The Wall Street Journal as a bestseller. In the early 2020s, Tutor co-founded UN'SWEET zero wine, a sugar-free wine company.

== Early life and education ==
Tutor was born on August 11, 1975, to Ronald Tutor, a well-known businessman, and Cheryl Osterkamp, and raised in Hidden Hills, California, a city and gated community in Los Angeles County, California. Ronald Tutor is the CEO of Tutor Perini (formerly Tutor Saliba), one of the largest civil and building contractors in the United States, through whom Tutor was introduced to real estate at a very young age. In 1997, Tutor graduated from The University of Southern California with a Bachelor of Arts in Theatre Arts.

== Career ==
=== Film and television ===
Tutor began her acting career in 1997, in the film Exposé, playing Tiffany Holmes, a Congressman's daughter who is paid off by a donor after being mistaken for an escort, and realizes that she can blackmail people in political circles. Her next role was as Prudence in the 1999 film, No Vacancy. Tutor started appearing in the real estate show, Million Dollar Listing Los Angeles (previously Million Dollar Listing), for its tenth season, which premiered in November 2017. She currently stars alongside Josh Flagg and Josh Altman. She is the first and only current female realtor to appear in the Million Dollar Listing Los Angeles main cast.

In August 2026, it was announced Tutor would be joining the cast of The Real Housewives of Beverly Hills for the sixteenth season.

=== Real estate ===
Tutor was a top agent at Douglas Elliman Beverly Hills, having sold hundreds of millions in residential real estate over the years, including the real estate portfolios of The Malibu Series collection by Scott Gillen and Atlantis The Royal in Dubai. Both instances were featured on the show. She continues to sell real estate in Los Angeles, nationally and globally and updates her followers through her social media. In January 2025, she moved to Compass.

=== Writing ===
In 2020, Tutor announced the publication of her first book, Fear Is Just a Four-Letter Word, which she described as being aimed at advising women in business.

== Personal life ==
Tutor was previously married to Jason Maltas for 13 years, and shares two daughters with him. They lived in Brentwood, Los Angeles. In February 2018, Tutor filed for divorce, citing "irreconcilable differences". Maltas "initially made appearances on the Million Dollar Listing franchise, but they were short-lived because the couple was already struggling". Tracy later confessed during the eleventh season of Million Dollar Listing premier that the hardest part of the divorce was not getting enough time with her kids. Her sister and sister-in-law are both interior designers, and her former husband is a residential contractor. As of 2022, she is in a relationship with celebrity personal trainer, Erik Anderson, who alongside Tutor, have been recognised by multiple media outlets for their fitness attributes throughout the lockdown of the COVID-19 pandemic. According to Tracy on 8/22/23 Jeff Lewis Live, Tracy and Erik are on a break with Erik moving out the previous month.

She filed a lawsuit against real estate agent Oren Alexander alleging that he drugged and sexually assaulted her after a real estate event in New York City.
