= Owning Manhattan =

American reality television show

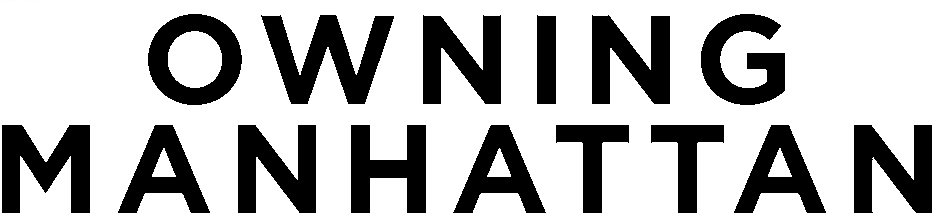
- Genre: Reality
- Starring: Ryan Serhant
- Country of origin: United States
- Original language: English
- No. of seasons: 2
- No. of episodes: 16

Production
- Executive producers: Bianca Barnes-Williams; Fenton Bailey; Kelly Montalvo; Randy Barbato; Tom Campbell
- Production locations: New York City, New York, United States
- Running time: 38–49 minutes
- Production company: World of Wonder

Original release
- Network: Netflix
- Release: June 28, 2024 – present

Owning Manhattan is an American reality television series for Netflix. It follows Ryan Serhant, a real estate mogul and CEO of real estate company SERHANT, and offers an inside look in the world of New York City luxury real estate. The show premiered all eight episodes on June 28, 2024. In August 2024, the show was renewed for a second season, which premiered on December 5, 2025.

== Cast ==
All main cast members are real estate agents at Serhant's company

- Ryan Serhant, CEO of SERHANT real estate company and host of the show
- Chloe Tucker Caine
- Jordan Hurt
- Jordan March
- Tricia Lee
- Jonathan Nørmølle
- Savannah Gowarty
- Nile Lundgren
- Jade Shenker
- Jess Markowski
- Jessica Taylor
- Jeffrey St. Arromand
- Genesis Suero

== Episodes ==
Season	Episodes	Originally released
1	8	June 28, 2024
2	8	December 5, 2025

=== Season 1 (2024) ===
Owning Manhattan episodes
No. overall	No. in season	Title	Original release date
1	1	"World's Most Expensive Penthouse"	June 28, 2024
2	2	"Next Gen"	June 28, 2024
3	3	"Negative Vibe Merchants"	June 28, 2024
4	4	"Pretty People Podcast"	June 28, 2024
5	5	"Swimming With Sharks"	June 28, 2024
6	6	"Crazy Promise"	June 28, 2024
7	7	"War & Real Estate"	June 28, 2024
8	8	"On the Edge"	June 28, 2024

=== Season 2 (2025) ===
Owning Manhattan Season 2 episodes
No. overall	No. in season	Title	Original release date
9	1	"No More Mr. Nice Ry"	December 5, 2025
10	2	"New Kid on the Block"	December 5, 2025
11	3	"There's No Business Like Chlo Business"	December 5, 2025
12	4	"Gone in a Flash"	December 5, 2025
13	5	"Wolf of Wall Street"	December 5, 2025
14	6	"Miami Heat"	December 5, 2025
15	7	"Bitcoin, Benz & Betrayal"	December 5, 2025
16	8	"If You Can Make It Here…"	December 5, 2025

== Reception ==
The rating at Common Sense Media is 14+, with a 3/5 rating. Lucy Mangan writing for The Guardian gave the show 2/5 stars, calling for fewer real estate agents on TV.
