= The Real Housewives of Orange County season 20 =

Season of American reality television series

The Real Housewives of Orange County
- Season 20
- Promotional poster
- Starring: Vicki Gunvalson; Tamra Judge; Heather Dubrow; Shannon Storms Beador; Gina Kirschenheiter; Emily Simpson; Jennifer Pedranti; Carmella Garcia
- No. of episodes: 19

Release
- Original network: Bravo
- Original release: July 9 – November 12, 2026

Season chronology
- ← Previous; Season 19

The twentieth season of the American reality television series The Real Housewives of Orange County, premiered on Bravo on July 9, 2026, and concluded on November 12 that same year. The season is produced by Sony Pictures Television's 32 Flavors Entertainment and Amazon MGM Studios' Evolution Media, and is primarily filmed in Orange County, California.

Tamra Judge, Heather Dubrow, Shannon Storms Beador, Gina Kirschenheiter, Emily Simpson, and Jennifer Pedranti returned as main cast members following the conclusion of the previous season. This season also marked the full-time return of Vicki Gunvalson who had not been a full-time cast member since the thirteenth season. Additionally, Carmella Garcia joined as a new main cast member.

== Cast ==
In November 2025, it was announced at BravoCon that Vicki Gunvalson had been offered and accepted the opportunity to return as a full-time housewife. In January of the following year, Katie Ginella, who joined during the eighteenth season, announced she would not be returning for the twentieth season, following Bravo's decision to "move forward" without her. Along with the season's announcement in June 2026, it was revealed the entirety of the regular cast from the previous season—Tamra Judge, Heather Dubrow, Shannon Storms Beador, Gina Kirschenheiter, Emily Simpson, and Jennifer Pedranti—would return. The season introduced a new housewife, former Playboy Playmate Carmella Garcia. Additionally, there were guest appearances by former cast members Kimberly Bryant, Jeana Keough, Lauri Peterson, Jo De La Rosa, Lizzie Rovsek, and Elizabeth Lyn Vargas.

== Production ==
In May 2026, it was announced the season would premiere on July 9 of the same year. The season is produced by 32 Flavors Entertainment and Evolution Media. Executive producers include Alex Baskin, Brian McCarthy, Luke Neslage, Lynsey Dufour, and Barry Poznick, alongside Scott Dunlop. Additionally, Andy Cohen serves as showrunner.

== Episodes ==
The Real Housewives of Orange County season 20 episodes
| No. overall | No. in season | Title | Rating (18–49) | Original release date | U.S. viewers (millions) |
|---|---|---|---|---|---|
| 349 | 1 | "Old Friends, New Era" | 0.10 | July 9, 2026 | 0.63 |
| 350 | 2 | "Not on My Bingo Card" | 0.10 | July 16, 2026 | 0.58 |
| 351 | 3 | "Why Can't We Be Friends?" | 0.08 | July 23, 2026 | 0.51 |
| 352 | 4 | "Boxed In" | TBA | July 30, 2026 | N/A |
| 353 | 5 | "Designers and Dildos" | TBA | August 6, 2026 | N/A |
| 354 | 6 | "Suite & Sour" | TBA | August 13, 2026 | N/A |
| 355 | 7 | "All Bets Are Off" | TBA | August 20, 2026 | N/A |
| 356 | 8 | "Sangria, Songria" | TBA | August 27, 2026 | N/A |
| 357 | 9 | "Ring of Truth" | TBA | September 3, 2026 | N/A |
| 358 | 10 | "Forbidden Fruit" | TBA | September 10, 2026 | N/A |
| 359 | 11 | "A Tale of Two Trips" | TBA | September 17, 2026 | N/A |
| 360 | 12 | "Lei It on Me" | TBA | September 24, 2026 | N/A |
| 361 | 13 | "Don't Look Now" | TBA | October 1, 2026 | N/A |
| 362 | 14 | "Friends and Fortunes" | TBA | October 8, 2026 | N/A |
| 363 | 15 | "For Goodness Sake" | TBA | October 15, 2026 | N/A |
| 364 | 16 | "Mad Money" | TBA | October 22, 2026 | TBD |
| 365 | 17 | "Reach for the SKYtops" | TBA | October 29, 2026 | TBD |
| 366 | 18 | "Reunion Part 1" | TBA | November 5, 2026 | TBD |
| 367 | 19 | "Reunion Part 2" | TBA | November 12, 2026 | TBD |
