= Andrew Greenwell =

American real estate broker and reality show personality

Andrew Greenwell is an American real estate broker and reality television personality. He was a cast member on Bravo's Million Dollar Listing San Francisco.

== Real estate career ==
Greenwell earned his real estate license as a 19-year-old college freshman. In 2007, he was named one of Realtor Magazine's "Top 30 Realtors in America Under 30."

Greenwell relocated to the San Francisco Bay Area in 2011. He currently is CEO and principal of Venture Sotheby's International Realty in Pleasanton.

In 2019, Greenwell acquired Sotheby’s International Realty operations on the Big Island of Hawaii.

== Million Dollar Listing San Francisco ==
In April 2015, Greenwell was announced as a cast member on the inaugural season of Million Dollar Listing San Francisco.
