= Benjamin Platt =

American businessman

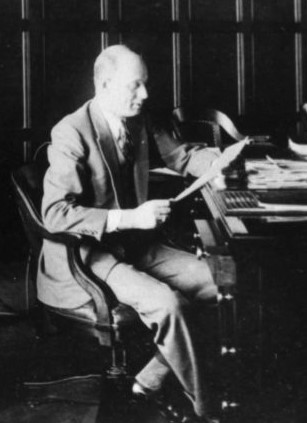
- c. early 1920s
- Born: December 17, 1883; Khodorkiv, Kiev Governorate, Russian Empire (modern-day Ukraine)
- Died: April 18, 1960 (aged 76); Los Angeles, California, U.S.
- Resting place: Mount Sinai Memorial Park Cemetery
- Employer: Platt Music Company
- Title: Chairman
- Spouse: Sophie Cohen
- Children: Herman Platt
- Relatives: Josh Flagg (great-grandson)

Benjamin Platt (December 17, 1883 – April 18, 1960) was an American businessman and philanthropist. He was the founder of the Platt Music Corporation, which he started in 1905.

== Biography ==
=== Early life ===
Benjamin Platt was born in Khodorkiv, a shtetl near Kyiv, Russian Empire (now a part of Ukraine). He moved to the United States in 1905, when he was twenty years old.

=== Career ===
He started his career as a salesman in New York City, for the Singer Sewing Machine Company. He moved to Los Angeles later that year and started The Platt Music Company; he began the company by selling pianos door-to-door.

Platt Music Corporation was a private company that leased space in department stores and sold consumer electric products. By 1926, its annual sales volume was in excess of $3 million and the company's total assets were approximately $2.7 million. Platt owned three buildings on Broadway in downtown Los Angeles: 830 Broadway, 840 Broadway, and 620-622 Broadway, next to the Orpheum Theatre. Walker & Eisen was the architectural firm that designed the 840 Broadway building. (Walker & Eisen is best known for the Beverly Wilshire Hotel in Beverly Hills, California.) Lange and Bergstrom were the contractors for 840 building.

By 1928, Platt Music was one of the largest retailers of its kind in the world. In 1929, the stock market crashed and Platt Music went into receivership. Because of Platt's good relationship with Tom May of the May Company, Platt rebuilt Platt Music to be bigger than ever. Platt Music contracted with the May Company to sell appliances in all of their stores.

By 1955, Platt Music was the largest retail business of its kind in America. Platt was honored at the Ambassador Hotel in 1955, on the anniversary of his 50th year in business. Some of the biggest names in Los Angeles attended this event, some from as far as Mexico.

=== Philanthropy ===
He was one of the founders of The City of Hope and was active on its Board for many years. He was also the President of the Jewish Home for the Aging. He served as the President of Sinai Temple for twenty-one years, the longest-serving president to date. Additionally, he was one of the founders of the University of Judaism, now known as the American Jewish University. He then served as its first executive vice president.

He was active in Masonry and was a member of Westgate Masonic Lodge, Scottish Rites, and the Al Malaikah Temple of the Shrine.

=== Death and legacy ===
Platt died at Cedars Hospital on April 18, 1960, at the age of 77. On April 19, the Los Angeles City Council adjourned in memory of Platt and stopped conducting any business transactions the rest of the day. He is the father of Herman Platt and Leo Platt, and the grandfather of Cynthia Platt Flagg and Nancy Platt Jacoby, Kenneth Platt (1932–2005), Steven Platt (1934–2001), and Susan Platt. He is the great-grandfather of Josh Flagg, Lindsey Arent Schank, Marc Platt, Benjamin Platt, Jonathan Platt, Cynthia Rogers, and Morgan Rogers.

== Sources ==
- Los Angeles Times "Music House to Finance" Dec 12, 1926
- B'nai B'rith
- City of Los Angeles, Resolution File No. 95830
- Los Angeles Examiner Fri May 6, 1955
- Los Angeles Examiner Mon May 19, 1958 p5 sec 1 "50 yrs. wed, say 'dont fight wife'
- "Music Firm Awards Job on Building", Los Angeles Times April 10, 1927 p e5
- Los Angeles Times April 5, 1922 p 113 "Long Lease on Broadway Site"
