= No Vacancy (1999 film) =

- Directed by: Marius Balchunas
- Written by: Marius Balchunas
- Produced by: Tom Todoroff
- Starring: Christina Ricci; Timothy Olyphant; Robert Wagner; Lolita Davidovich; Gabriel Mann
- Cinematography: Denis Maloney
- Edited by: Dennis Hill
- Music by: Alex Wurman
- Production company: 2 Loop Films
- Release date: April 16, 1999
- Running time: 84 minutes
- Country: United States
- Language: English

No Vacancy is a 1999 American independent comedy film written and directed by Marius Balchunas in his directorial debut.

== Plot ==
The film is about the various people who inhabit the seedy Pink Motel in Los Angeles. Two men wake up with hookers, then proceed to accost a beauty-obsessed woman (Lolita Davidovich); the Latino motel owner (Joaquim de Almeida) is angered after finding his daughter (Patricia Velasquez) wants to marry a white man; a young woman (Christina Ricci) wakes up to find a stranger (Timothy Olyphant) in her bed.

== Cast ==
- Christina Ricci as Lilian
- Timothy Olyphant as Luke
- Robert Wagner as Mr. Tangerine
- Lolita Davidovich as Constance
- Gabriel Mann as Michael
- Ryan Bollman as Pete
- Joaquim De Almeida as Reynaldo
- Patricia Velasquez as Ramona
- Graham Beckel as "Do It Again" Guy
- Rhona Bennett as Penelope
- Olek Krupa as Leonard
- Tracy Tutor as Prudence
