= Josh Flagg =

American realtor and television personality

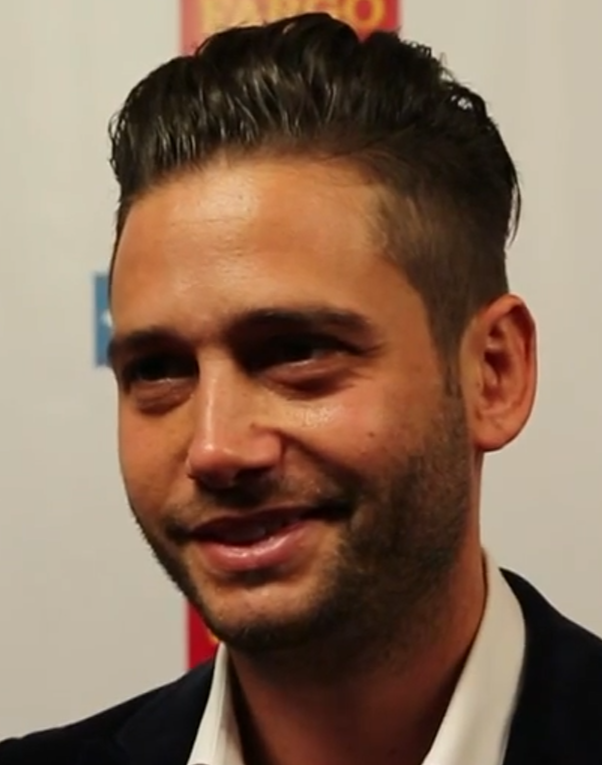
- Flagg in 2014
- Born: Joshua Daniel Flagg; August 20, 1985 (age 41); Los Angeles, California
- Occupations: Real estate broker; Television personality
- Employer: Compass
- Television: Bravo's Million Dollar Listing Los Angeles
- Spouse: Bobby Boyd (m. 2017 div. 2023)
- Relatives: Edith Flagg (grandmother)
- Website: joshflagg.com

Joshua Daniel Flagg (born August 20, 1985) is an American real estate agent, television personality and author.

He is an original cast member on the show Million Dollar Listing Los Angeles on the Bravo television network. The show follows young real estate agents in Los Angeles as they sell high-end homes. Flagg has been recognized by The Wall Street Journal as one of the top-ranked agents in California and nationally by sales volume and as a top 25 real estate agent by The Hollywood Reporter.

Flagg has authored three books, The Deal: Secrets for Mastering the Art of Negotiation, A Simple Girl: Stories My Grandmother Told Me, published in 2009, and Million Dollar Agent: Brokering the Dream, which was published in 2011. Flagg was featured on Forbes' 30 Under 30 in 2012 as a top record-breaking real estate agent. He has also been featured on NBC's Today Show, ABC's Good Morning America E!, CBS The Insider, Fox, and Bravo's Watch What Happens: Live as well as in the pages of The Wall Street Journal, Los Angeles Times, Forbes Magazine, and Variety, among others. As an advocate for community welfare, Josh Flagg has hosted several events for the City of Hope and Angelfood, helping to raise awareness and funds for life-saving cancer research and treatment programs.

== Early life ==
Josh Flagg was born on August 20, 1985, in Los Angeles, California. He is the son of Michael and Cindy (Platt) Flagg of Los Angeles. He is the grandson of philanthropist, electronics industry executive and Jewish leader Herman Platt, and great-grandson of Benjamin Platt, founder and owner of the nationwide Platt Music Corporation chain of stores. On his father's side, Flagg is the grandson of American (Austrian-born) fashion industry executive and designer Edith Flagg, best known as the first designers to import polyester as a fashion textile to the United States. Edith was later known for her reoccurring role on Million Dollar Listing Los Angeles alongside her grandson.

Flagg grew up in Los Angeles where he attended Brentwood School, a private school in the Brentwood section of Los Angeles. In 2003, Flagg left Brentwood and attended Beverly Hills High School where he graduated the following year.

== Career ==
Flagg began working as a real estate agent at the age of 18 when he started making residential sales in high end neighborhoods such as Beverly Hills and the Sunset Strip. Flagg began his career while still in high school under real estate broker Bruce Nelson with the John Bruce Nelson firm in Bel Air, followed by a brief stint at the Coldwell Banker Beverly Hills East office in 2007.

Throughout his career as a real estate agent, Flagg has had many record sales, including the highest sale in the history of Brentwood Park and a $25 million residential sale in Beverly Hills. He has also been the listing agent for reputable estates including Merv Griffin's Bel Air estate and the Dorothy Chandler Estate in Hancock Park. He has also sold homes to various celebrities including Adam Levine, Steve Aoki, Shonda Rhymes and Tom Ford, Robert Lamm, Gavin Palone, Jody Gerson, Suzanne Somers, Justin Mateen, Matthew Perry.

In 2009, he started "Josh Flagg Estates." According to Forbes, Flagg has sold over $1 billion worth of property during his career. He later began working with Rodeo Realty. In 2024, he joined Compass.

=== Million Dollar Listing Los Angeles ===
In 2006, Flagg, along with two other agents, Madison Hildebrand and Chad Rogers, were picked to star in a reality TV series following their careers in the real estate industry. They started filming for the show, Million Dollar Listing Los Angeles, and it aired on Bravo in August 2006. The show continued with the original cast until Season 4 when Josh Altman co-starred along with Flagg and Hildebrand.

After Season 6 concluded in 2013, Hildebrand left the show, making Flagg the only remaining original cast member. Flagg and Altman were joined by James Harris and David Parnes for Season 7. The series aired its 10th Season in 2017, with Flagg, Harris, Hildebrand and Parnes returning and realtor Tracy Tutor joining its cast.

== Other activities ==
At 14 years old, Flagg began writing a book about his grandmother, Edith Flagg. As her only grandchild, Flagg was close to his grandmother, who was a Holocaust survivor and, later, a fashion industry executive. The book, A Simple Girl: Stories My Grandmother Told Me, was published in 2009. Proceeds from the book's sales go towards the Jewish Federation of Greater Los Angeles.

Flagg published his second book, Million Dollar Agent: Brokering the Dream, in 2011. The book is an autobiography that details his personal life from growing up in Los Angeles to becoming one of the city's top real estate agents.

In 2012, Flagg started a mobile app called 'Star Maps,' which is a directory of hundreds of properties associated with celebrities in the Los Angeles area. The app uses GPS to direct users and tourists to places of well-known estates or celebrity properties with details about the home and its celebrity-ownership that are cross-referenced with research from the city's public records.

Melissa Rivers presented Flagg with the Next Generation award from the Los Angeles Museum of the Holocaust in 2013.

== Personal life ==
Flagg lives in Beverly Hills, California, and in January 2013, he purchased a micro-estate above the Sunset Strip and sold the property in 2015. In June 2015, Flagg bought an estate in Beverly Hills. He also owns his late grandmother's penthouse in the Century Towers complex in Century City.

Flagg is openly gay, having come out in March 2011. In July 2016, Flagg proposed to his fiancé, Bobby Boyd, during a flash mob at the Four Seasons Hotel George V. The couple got married on September 10, 2017, at the Beverly Hills Hotel, LA. The couple announced their divorce in March 2022.

Flagg is a collector of fine art, rare automobiles, and one of the largest collectors of Billy Haines furniture in the country.

Flagg serves on the Board of Governors of Cedars-Sinai Medical Center in Los Angeles and the Los Angeles Jewish home. In 2016, he co-chaired the "Rock for Research" event for Cedars-Sinai.

== See also ==
- Bravo (American TV network)
- Million Dollar Listing Los Angeles
