= Million Dollar Listing India =

- Genre: Reality
- Based on: Million Dollar Listing (American franchise)
- Developed by: Banijay/Endemol Shine India
- Starring: Ankush Sayal; Hem Batra; Navdeep Khanuja; Karuna Gidwani; Deepti Malik; Prajesh Bhatia
- Country of origin: India
- Original language: Hindi/English
- No. of seasons: 2
- No. of episodes: 27

Production
- Executive producer: Endemol Shine India (Banijay Asia)
- Production company: Endemol Shine India

Original release
- Network: SonyLIV
- Release: October 25, 2024 – present

Million Dollar Listing India is an Indian reality television series and the second international adaptation of the Emmy-nominated Million Dollar Listing franchise. Produced by Endemol Shine India (Banijay Asia), the series premiered on SonyLIV on 25 October 2024. It follows six luxury real estate agents working in India's high-end property market.

== Format ==
The show is based on the American Million Dollar Listing format, which chronicles real estate agents negotiating high-stakes property deals. The Indian version highlights luxury properties in cities such as Delhi, Gurgaon, and Mumbai, while portraying the personal and professional lives of the agents.

== Production ==
The series was produced by Endemol Shine India in association with Banijay Asia. SonyLIV acquired the digital streaming rights, releasing the show as an original series in October 2024.

== Realtors ==
The first season features six real estate agents. The second season features the return of real estate agents Hem Batra and Ankuch Sayal from Season 1, and Joined by new real estate agents Indu Dahiya, Kajal Bhalla and Ashima Aggarwal. Season 2 also features guest appearances by Uorfi Javed and Shalini Passi, who collaborate with the realtors during the season.

=== Realtor timeline ===
Realtor	Seasons	
Realtor	1	2
Ankush Sayal	✓	✓
Hem Batra	✓	✓
Navdeep Khanuja	✓	
Karuna Gidwani	✓	
Deepti Malik	✓	
Prajesh Bhatia	✓	
Inddu Dahiya		✓
Kajal Bhalla		✓
Ashima Aggarwal		✓

== Episodes ==
=== Season 1 (2024) ===
Season 1 episodes of Million Dollar Listing India
No.	Title	Original air date
1	"Junoon Ka Dhanda"	25 October 2024
2	"From Bare Shell to Value Creation"	1 November 2024
3	"Limited Edition Properties"	8 November 2024
4	"Dream Homes"	15 November 2024
5	"Potential Buyers and Sellers"	22 November 2024
6	"Exclusive Deals for Exclusive Clients"	29 November 2024
7	"Bringing a Project to the Table"	6 December 2024
8	"From Staging to Finalising"	13 December 2024
9	"On the Lookout for Exclusive Properties"	20 December 2024
10	"Cracking a Million Dollar Deal"	27 December 2024
11	"Right Place, Right Time, Right Location"	3 January 2025
12	"Striking Deals and Making Strategies"	10 January 2025

=== Season 2 (2025) ===
A second season will be released on 22 September 2025 on SonyLIV. Returning cast members include Hem Batra and Ankuch Sayal.

The second season of Million Dollar Listing India premiered on Sony LIV had 15 episodes.

Season 2 (2025)
No.	Title	Duration	Release date
1	Wheels, Deals & High-Rise Dreams	30 min	22 September 2025
2	Deal Or No Deal	28 min	23 September 2025
3	Size Does Matter	31 min	24 September 2025
4	Location. Location. Location.	31 min	29 September 2025
5	Deals And Distractions	31 min	30 September 2025
6	Demands, Deals And Drama	30 min	1 October 2025
7	Vastu Or Not, The Listing Is Hot	31 min	6 October 2025
8	Everything That Can Go Wrong	31 min	7 October 2025
9	More Commissions, More Problems	32 min	8 October 2025
10	Open House Open Drama	30 min	13 October 2025
11	Surprise Birthdays & Surprise Alliances	30 min	14 October 2025
12	Appreciation Vs Desperation	28 min	15 October 2025
13	Vaastu Check, Price Uncheck	29 min	20 October 2025
14	Closing Deals & Chaos	28 min	21 October 2025
15	Wheels, Deals & Bigger Dreams	36 min	22 October 2025
