= Ryan Serhant =

American real estate broker and television personality

Ryan Matthew Serhant (born July 2, 1984) is an American real estate broker and reality television personality. He is founder and CEO of Serhant, an American real estate firm, as well as the lead and executive producer of Owning Manhattan, a reality show on Netflix.

== Early life and education ==
Serhant was raised in Topsfield, on the North Shore of Massachusetts. He attended the Pingree School and Hamilton College, where he majored in English literature and theatre. After graduating in 2006, Serhant moved to New York City to launch an acting career, eventually starring as Evan Walsh in As the World Turns.

== Career ==
=== Real estate ===
In 2008, Serhant was hired at Nest Seekers International, where he became executive vice president and managing director. On September 15, 2020, he announced that he was starting his own real estate firm, Serhant, using his social media presence and TV appearances to market the company's brand. Competitors have criticized Serhant for prioritizing himself over his clients.

=== Television ===
In 2010, Serhant auditioned for Million Dollar Listing New York, a spin-off of Million Dollar Listing Los Angeles, and starred in the show alongside Frederik Eklund. Serhant starred in the show until 2021, and appeared in a number of spin-offs as well.

In 2014, he had a supporting role in Noah Baumbach's 2014 film, While We're Young. On June 28, 2024, Serhant's reality show Owning Manhattan premiered on Netflix.

== Personal life ==
In 2016, Serhant married lawyer Emilia Bechrakis in Corfu, in a Greek church, following Serhant's conversion to the Greek Orthodox Church. Serhant and Bechrakis have one daughter, who was born in 2019.
