= Million Dollar Listing =

American reality television series franchise

Million Dollar Listing is an American reality television series franchise on the Bravo network. Each show chronicles the professional and personal lives of real estate agents based in a major American city as they sell high-end properties, giving viewers an inside look at the world of high-priced real estate.

The franchise began with the show Million Dollar Listing Los Angeles (originally Million Dollar Listing), which debuted on August 29, 2006. That series has since aired 14 seasons.

The success of the Los Angeles based version of the show spawned several spin-offs and international editions:

- Million Dollar Listing Miami – 1 season, 2014
- Million Dollar Listing New York – 9 seasons, 2012-2021
- Million Dollar Listing San Francisco – 1 season, 2015
- Million Dollar Listing UAE – 1 season, 2023
- Million Dollar Listing India – 1 season, 2024
- Million Dollar Listing Nederland – 1 season, 2026

Additionally, Million Dollar Listing New York spawned two shows starring broker Ryan Serhant: Million Dollar Listing New York: Ryan’s Wedding and Sell it Like Serhant. The first international version is Million Dollar Listing UAE produced by imageNation and streaming Exclusively on Starzplay as of September 15th 2023 with a featured cameo from Josh Altman, and Matt Altman stars of the LA version. The bi-lingual series, which is available to stream on the Middle East and North African region video-on-demand platform Starzplay, offers viewers a glimpse into the lives of five prominent UAE-based brokers as they navigate the competitive real estate business in Abu Dhabi and Dubai, all while balancing their personal lives.

Following the hit series from Bravo in the US, the first international version of the show in the UAE follows the journeys of Ben Bandari, Zay Brown, Riad Gohar, Nassira Sekkay and Rami Wahood. The Million Dollar Listing franchise was parodied in the 2016–19 streaming comedy series Bajillion Dollar Propertie$.

Million Dollar Listing Nederland was released in 2026. The show follows the journeys of Bart ter Haar, Karina Nippérus, Leslie de Ruiter and Mandy Heruer. It was the first show of the franchise which was made in Europe. Mauricio Umansky also made some guest apparences.
