= Million Dollar Beach House =

2020 American reality television series

- Genre: Reality show
- Country of origin: United States
- Original language: English
- No. of seasons: 1
- No. of episodes: 6

Production
- Executive producers: Nick Rigg; Eddie Shapiro; Tony DiSanto; Tommy Coriale; Paul Yuan
- Cinematography: Patrick Armitage
- Editors: Eddie Gutch; Amber Haas
- Running time: 23–30 minutes
- Production company: DIGA Studios

Original release
- Network: Netflix
- Release: August 26, 2020

Related
- Selling Sunset

Million Dollar Beach House is a reality television series that aired on Netflix on August 26, 2020. The show follows a group of young and ambitious agents, part of the Nest Seekers International, selling multi-million dollar deals on luxurious listings in The Hamptons. Season 1 consisted of six episodes. As of September 2020, there had been no confirmation of a second season.

Subsequently it was announced that the show had been picked up by Discovery+ and would be renamed to "Selling the Hamptons." The filming of Season One of Selling the Hamptons wrapped in Summer 2021 and began streaming on January 20, 2022.

In June 2025, Million Dollar Beach House realtor Sara Burack was killed in a hit-and-run.

== Cast ==
- J.B. Andreassi
- Michael Fulfree
- James "Jimmy" Giugliano
- Noel Roberts
- Peggy Zabakolas
- Sara Burack

== Episodes ==
No.	Title	Original release date
1	"Selling Season"	August 26, 2020
2	"Rookie Mistakes"	August 26, 2020
3	"The Evil Twin"	August 26, 2020
4	"If You Want a Friend, Get a Dog"	August 26, 2020
5	"Don't Rock The Boat"	August 26, 2020
6	"Moving In"	August 26, 2020

== Release ==
Million Dollar Beach House was released on August 26, 2020, on Netflix.
