= Million Dollar Listing New York =

American reality television series (2012–2021)

- Genre: Reality
- Starring: Fredrik Eklund; Michael Lorber; Ryan Serhant; Luis D. Ortiz; Steve Gold; Tyler Whitman; Kirsten Jordan
- Country of origin: United States
- Original language: English
- No. of seasons: 9
- No. of episodes: 117

Production
- Executive producers: Randy Barbato; Fenton Bailey; Danielle King; Shannon Wilson
- Running time: 41–43 minutes
- Production company: World of Wonder

Original release
- Network: Bravo
- Release: March 7, 2012 – August 26, 2021

Related
- Million Dollar Listing; Million Dollar Listing Los Angeles; Million Dollar Listing Miami; Million Dollar Listing San Francisco

Million Dollar Listing New York is an American reality television series that aired on Bravo from March 7, 2012, to August 26, 2021. The show follows the lives of several luxury real estate agents as they represent property owners in New York City's five boroughs. It is a spin-off of Million Dollar Listing Los Angeles.

It was nominated for two Emmy Awards.

== Production ==
In April 2010, World of Wonder productions started seeking real estate agents within New York City for a Million Dollar Listing spin-off. The official series debut date was announced on January 27, 2012, with Michael Lorber (son of Howard Lorber), Ryan Serhant and Fredrik Eklund as the original cast. Serhant, then the Executive Vice President and Managing Director at Nest Seekers International, was added to the cast last minute replacing another potential cast member The first season averaged 1.04 million total viewers.

In 2012, Andy Cohen announced on Watch What Happens Live that the series had been renewed for a second season. Bravo officially renewed the series for a second season which debuted on May 8, 2013, with cast member Luis D. Ortiz replacing Michael Lorber who chose not to return due to the series not improving his business. The same year, Serhant launched his bi-coastal brokerage team, The Serhant Team.

Million Dollar Listing New York was renewed for a third season on August 1, 2013. Season 3 premiered on April 2, 2014, with the full second-season cast returning. The third season finale was the highest-rated episode of the season with 1.3 million total viewers.

In 2014, the show was nominated for an Emmy award in the Outstanding Unstructured Reality Program category. On July 14, 2014, Million Dollar Listing New York was renewed for a fourth season, which premiered on April 15, 2015. The same year, the show was nominated for a second Emmy award in the same category. The fifth season of the series premiered on April 21, 2016. In July 2016, Luis Ortiz announced his departure from the show. On October 27, 2016, the show was renewed for a sixth season. During the show's sixth season, Serhant's 2016 wedding to Emily Bechrakis was chronicled in a four-part mini-series, Million Dollar Listing New York: Ryan’s Wedding. In 2017, MDLNY spun-off its own show, Sell it Like Serhant on Bravo starring Serhant. In April 2018, the show was renewed for a seventh season. The seventh season premiered on June 11, 2018 and the finale episode aired on September 4, 2018.

On June 10, 2019, the series was renewed for an eighth season which premiered on August 1, 2019.

The ninth season of the series was announced in March 2021 and premiered on May 6, 2021, with broker Kirsten Jordan joining the cast.

On January 24, 2022, Fredrik Eklund announced his departure from the Million Dollar Listing franchise.

On July 5, 2022, the series was canceled after nine seasons.

== Realtors ==
The last cast consisted of Fredrik Eklund, Ryan Serhant, Steve Gold, Tyler Whitman and Kirsten Jordan. Previously featured realtors included Michael Lorber and Luis D. Ortiz.

=== Realtor timeline ===
Realtor	Seasons								
Realtor	1	2	3	4	5	6	7	8	9
Fredrik Eklund	Main								
Ryan Serhant	Main								
Michael Lorber	Main				Guest			Guest	
Luis D. Ortiz		Main				Friend		Main	
Steve Gold						Main			
Tyler Whitman								Main	
Kirsten Jordan									Main

== Episodes ==
Season	Episodes	Season premiere	Season finale
1	9	March 7, 2012	May 2, 2012
2	12	May 8, 2013	July 31, 2013
3	14	April 2, 2014	July 2, 2014
4	12	April 15, 2015	July 1, 2015
5	12	April 21, 2016	July 7, 2016
Ryan's Wedding	4	September 22, 2016	October 13, 2016
6	12	May 25, 2017	August 10, 2017
7	12	June 11, 2018	September 4, 2018
8	14	August 1, 2019	October 31, 2019
9	16	May 6, 2021	August 26, 2021
Ryan's Renovation	4	June 3, 2021	June 24, 2021

=== Season 1 (2012) ===
No. overall	No. in season	Title	Original release date	U.S. viewers (millions)
1	1	"The Shark, the Smooth-Talker and the New Kid"	March 7, 2012	0.74
2	2	"Parlez-Vous, Francais?"	March 14, 2012	0.91
3	3	"Hard Hats and Hard Heads"	March 21, 2012	0.83
4	4	"Construction, Conniptions and a Kangaroo"	March 28, 2012	0.95
5	5	"The Casting Couch"	April 4, 2012	0.86
6	6	"Bailing on the Bully"	April 11, 2012	0.99
7	7	"Don't Throw Stones in Glass Buildings"	April 18, 2012	0.83
8	8	"Sweden and the Shark"	April 25, 2012	1.05
9	9	"Look Me in the Eye"	May 2, 2012	1.06

=== Season 2 (2013) ===
No. overall	No. in season	Title	Original release date	U.S. viewers (millions)
10	1	"Surprise Bitch, I'm in the Pool"	May 8, 2013	0.80
11	2	"Two Hotheads and a Hurricane"	May 15, 2013	0.81
12	3	"Bow Rooms and Broome Sticks"	May 22, 2013	0.86
13	4	"Video Killed the Radio Star"	May 29, 2013	1.19
14	5	"All The World's a-Staging"	June 5, 2013	0.96
15	6	"The Days of Licking Bricks Are Over"	June 12, 2013	0.96
16	7	"Will Haze for Listening"	June 19, 2013	1.20
17	8	"Lord Have Mercer!"	June 26, 2013	1.12
18	9	"Don't Forget the Hands! Dinosaur Hands!"	July 10, 2013	0.99
19	10	"Harlem Shake"	July 17, 2013	1.16
20	11	"Do You, Frederik, Take This Building?"	July 24, 2013	1.12
21	12	"A Shark Is Born"	July 31, 2013	1.59

=== Season 3 (2014) ===
No. overall	No. in season	Title	Original release date	U.S. viewers (millions)
22	1	"This City Will Eat You Alive"	April 2, 2014	1.20
23	2	"It's Time to Eat the Fish!"	April 9, 2014	1.06
24	3	"There's No Crying in Real Estate"	April 16, 2014	1.17
25	4	"Reach High"	April 23, 2014	1.06
26	5	"I Ain't Afraid of No Ghosts"	April 30, 2014	1.01
27	6	"Bidding War Bitches"	May 7, 2014	0.90
28	7	"East Coast vs. West Coast"	May 14, 2014	0.96
29	8	"Where We're Going We Don't Need Roads"	May 21, 2014	1.05
30	9	"I Dream of Jeanne"	May 28, 2014	1.08
31	10	"From Pocket Squares to Pocket Listings"	June 4, 2014	1.15
32	11	"The Wolves of Wall St."	June 11, 2014	1.28
33	12	"Reunion — Part 1"	June 18, 2014	1.16
34	13	"Reunion — Part 2"	June 25, 2014	1.13
35	14	"Uncensored"	July 2, 2014	0.75

=== Season 4 (2015) ===
No. overall	No. in season	Title	Original release date	U.S. viewers (millions)
36	1	"New Wheels, New Deals"	April 15, 2015	1.10
37	2	"Bids & Brawls"	April 22, 2015	1.11
38	3	"Three Brokers and a Baby"	April 29, 2015	0.95
39	4	"Frenemies Unite"	May 6, 2015	1.00
40	5	"Walking on Eggshells"	May 13, 2015	0.82
41	6	"Unfinished Business"	May 20, 2015	0.75
42	7	"I Love You, Puffer Munkin"	May 27, 2015	1.11
43	8	"Don't Count Your Eggs..."	June 3, 2015	1.05
44	9	"Dude, Where's My Broker?"	June 10, 2015	0.99
45	10	"Luis 2.0"	June 17, 2015	0.97
46	11	"The Final Shakedown"	June 24, 2015	1.06
47	12	"Don't Touch Me, Bro"	July 1, 2015	1.22

=== Season 5 (2016) ===
No. overall	No. in season	Title	Original release date	U.S. viewers (millions)
48	1	"50 Shades of Greystone"	April 21, 2016	0.99
49	2	"Bleecker and Bleaker"	April 28, 2016	0.83
50	3	"Planet of the Capes"	May 5, 2016	0.90
51	4	"No Sleep Till Brooklyn Sells"	May 12, 2016	1.05
52	5	"Murray up and Wait"	May 19, 2016	1.06
53	6	"Tug of Warhol"	May 26, 2016	1.13
54	7	"A More Modern Family"	June 2, 2016	1.19
55	8	"No Moore Mr. Nice Guy"	June 9, 2016	1.24
56	9	"Take a Walker"	June 16, 2016	1.21
57	10	"Windows to Your Sale"	June 23, 2016	1.04
58	11	"Real Men Wear Pink...Tutus"	June 30, 2016	1.10
59	12	"Seaportlandia"	July 7, 2016	1.23

=== Ryan's Wedding (2016) ===
No. overall	No. in season	Title	Original release date	U.S. viewers (millions)
60	1	"It's All Greek to Me"	September 22, 2016	0.77
61	2	"Million Dollar ... Wedding?"	September 29, 2016	0.87
62	3	"Poseidon Serhant"	October 6, 2016	0.73
63	4	"Here Comes the Bride...zilla"	October 13, 2016	1.01

=== Season 6 (2017) ===
No. overall	No. in season	Title	Original release date	U.S. viewers (millions)
64	1	"Good as Gold"	May 25, 2017	0.94
65	2	"The Kids Aren't Alright"	June 1, 2017	0.94
66	3	"Frankel-y Speaking"	June 8, 2017	1.01
67	4	"Hashtag, You're It"	June 15, 2017	1.09
68	5	"Under the Influencers"	June 22, 2017	0.81
69	6	"Ice, Ice, Ryan"	June 29, 2017	1.01
70	7	"Co-List or No-List"	July 6, 2017	1.14
71	8	"It Takes a (East) Village"	July 13, 2017	0.98
72	9	"You Can Call Me Al...berto"	July 20, 2017	0.92
73	10	"Wake. Sell. Repeat."	July 27, 2017	0.92
74	11	"Pushing the Envelopes"	August 3, 2017	0.94
75	12	"The French Connection"	August 10, 2017	0.98

=== Season 7 (2018) ===
No. overall	No. in season	Title	Original release date	U.S. viewers
76	1	"Rebel without a House"	June 11, 2018	649,000
77	2	"Peanut Butter & Jealous"	June 18, 2018	703,000
78	3	"50 Cent & 6 Percent"	June 25, 2018	810,000
79	4	"Chinese Take-out"	July 2, 2018	825,000
80	5	"Ready, Set, Baby!"	July 17, 2018	571,000
81	6	"Circa Circus"	July 24, 2018	698,000
82	7	"Pool Party"	July 31, 2018	808,000
83	8	"Town Goes Down"	August 7, 2018	752,000
84	9	"Trouble in Paradise"	August 14, 2018	818,000
85	10	"Billion Dollar Listing"	August 21, 2018	775,000
86	11	"Yippee Ki Yay!"	August 28, 2018	735,000
87	12	"Whale of a Sale"	September 4, 2018	772,000

=== Season 8 (2019) ===
No. overall	No. in season	Title	Original release date	U.S. viewers
88	1	"Drumming Up Buyers"	August 1, 2019	732,000
89	2	"A New York Upstate of Mind"	August 8, 2019	922,000
90	3	"Tech-nical Difficulties"	August 15, 2019	873,000
91	4	"Jess We Can!"	August 22, 2019	798,000
92	5	"Construction Criticism"	August 29, 2019	897,000
93	6	"The Weight Is Over"	September 5, 2019	769,000
94	7	"Polar Opposites"	September 12, 2019	746,000
95	8	"Better Laight Than Never"	September 19, 2019	906,000
96	9	"The Snowball Effect"	September 26, 2019	706,000
97	10	"Coast Stories"	October 3, 2019	710,000
98	11	"Loss Angeles"	October 10, 2019	704,000
99	12	"Ruffled Heathers"	October 17, 2019	713,000
100	13	"Co-List or No-List"	October 24, 2019	843,000
101	14	"Four Men and a Baby"	October 31, 2019	876,000

=== Season 9 (2021) ===
No. overall	No. in season	Title	Original release date	U.S. viewers
102	1	"New Girl on the Block"	May 6, 2021	603,000
103	2	"Freddy's Back!"	May 13, 2021	533,000
104	3	"House of Style"	May 20, 2021	509,000
105	4	"Townhouse in the Sky"	May 27, 2021	446,000
106	5	"Walkups and Meltdowns"	June 3, 2021	469,000
107	6	"Escape from New York"	June 10, 2021	522,000
108	7	"Virtually Freddy"	June 17, 2021	457,000
109	8	"Downward Dog, Upward Mobility"	June 24, 2021	414,000
110	9	"Broker in the Rye"	July 8, 2021	634,000
111	10	"New York Upstate of Mind"	July 15, 2021	499,000
112	11	"Virtual Insanity"	July 22, 2021	594,000
113	12	"A Home for Hope"	July 29, 2021	486,000
114	13	"Power Playdate"	August 5, 2021	526,000
115	14	"Wined, Dined, Deal?"	August 12, 2021	545,000
116	15	"Meltdown in Midtown"	August 19, 2021	548,000
117	16	"New York Is Back!"	August 26, 2021	532,000

=== Ryan's Renovation (2021) ===
No. overall	No. in season	Title	Original release date	U.S. viewers (millions)
118	1	"My Big Fat Greek Renovation"	June 3, 2021	N/A
119	2	"Over Budget and Under Lockdown"	June 10, 2021	N/A
120	3	"The Despina Dilemma"	June 17, 2021	N/A
121	4	"Brownstone Milestone"	June 24, 2021	N/A

== Broadcast ==
Internationally, the series premiered in Australia on September 25, 2016 on Arena. In the United Kingdom, the series is shown on ITVBe and via Amazon Prime Video and Hayu.
