= Million Dollar Listing San Francisco =

- Genre: Reality television
- Starring: Justin Fichelson; Andrew Greenwell; Roh Habibi
- Country of origin: United States
- Original language: English
- No. of seasons: 1
- No. of episodes: 9

Production
- Executive producers: Fenton Bailey; Randy Barbato; Tom Campbell; Danielle King
- Camera setup: Multiple
- Running time: 42 minutes
- Production company: World of Wonder

Original release
- Network: Bravo
- Release: July 8 – September 2, 2015

Related
- Million Dollar Listing Los Angeles; Million Dollar Listing New York; Million Dollar Listing Miami

Million Dollar Listing San Francisco is an American reality television series on Bravo that premiered on July 8, 2015. The show was greenlit by the network in July and the production commenced in October 2014. The series is developed as the fourth installment of the Million Dollar Listing franchise, following Million Dollar Listing Los Angeles, New York and Miami.

The series chronicles the personal and professional lives of three high-profile real estate agents as they try to outsell each other, listing one of the most expensive and prestigious properties around the San Francisco Bay Area.

On April 27, 2016, the series was cancelled after one season.

== Realtors ==
- Justin Fichelson, one of the Bay Area's top luxury brokers at Fichelson Real Estate Group.
- Andrew Greenwell, CEO and principal at Venture Sotheby's International Realty, specializing in ultra-luxury real estate in the San Francisco area. He is a graduate of Florida State University and was named one of Realtor Magazine's "Top 30 Realtors in America Under 30". Prior to starting his own company in September 2014, he worked as CEO and team leader of Keller Williams Tri-Valley Realty managing more than 150 agents.
- Roh Habibi, an agent for Coldwell Banker Previews International. In 2014, he placed in the top 6%, ranking #255 out of 4,100 realtors in the San Francisco Association served as the chairman of their Young Professional Network. He is also a member of The Financial Planning Association's Chapters in San Francisco, East Bay, and Silicon Valley.

== Episodes ==
No.	Title	Original release date	U.S. viewers (millions)
1	"The New Gold Rush"	July 8, 2015	0.77
2	"Remember the Alamo Listing"	July 15, 2015	0.43
3	"When You Wish Upon A Starchitect"	July 22, 2015	0.54
4	"Fights in Bernal Heights"	July 29, 2015	0.58
5	"We'll Always Have Paris..."	August 5, 2015	0.71
6	"We Are the Chammy-ions"	August 12, 2015	0.57
7	"Carry On, Hayward Son"	August 19, 2015	0.62
8	"St. Louie Blues"	August 26, 2015	0.52
9	"I Don't Have Time for This, Tiny Man!"	September 2, 2015	0.68

== Broadcast ==
The series premiered in Australia on August 17, 2015, on Arena.
