= Million Dollar Listing Miami =

- Genre: Reality television
- Starring: Chad Carroll; Chris Leavitt; Samantha DeBianchi
- Country of origin: United States
- Original language: English
- No. of seasons: 1
- No. of episodes: 8

Production
- Executive producers: Eric Detwiler; Fenton Bailey; Randy Barbato; Tom Campbell
- Running time: 41–43 minutes
- Production company: World of Wonder

Original release
- Network: Bravo
- Release: June 25 – August 13, 2014

Related
- Million Dollar Listing Los Angeles; Million Dollar Listing New York; Million Dollar Listing San Francisco

Million Dollar Listing Miami is an American reality television series that premiered June 25, 2014, on Bravo. It features three Miami-based real estate agents – Chad Carroll, Chris Leavitt, and Samantha DeBianchi – as they balance their personal and professional lives. Announced in October 2013, Million Dollar Listing Miami is the second spin-off of Million Dollar Listing Los Angeles, following Million Dollar Listing New York.

== Realtors ==
- Chad Carroll, Executive Vice-President at Douglas Elliman
- Chris Leavitt, one of the top brokers at Douglas Elliman
- Samantha DeBianchi, founder of DeBianchi Real Estate

== Episodes ==
No.	Title	Original release date	U.S. viewers (millions)
1	"The Ultimate Luxury Playground"	June 25, 2014	0.86
Chad is looking to stake his claim in the exclusive neighborhood of Palm Island. Chris brushes up on his Russian as he works from his bathtub to sell a $6 million penthouse
2	"Co-listers Can't Be Choosers"	July 2, 2014	0.82
Chris charms his way into a co-listing at a one-of-a-kind penthouse in Boca Raton. While Sam faces a tough decision as the deadline to sell her listing quickly approaches.
3	"Trouble in Paradise"	July 9, 2014	0.617
Sam heads back home to Ft. Lauderdale to help a picky buyer and her pet pit-bull find the perfect waterfront home. Chris' co-listing takes an unexpected turn that could ruin a potential deal.
4	"Deals, Discounts And Potential Disaster"	July 16, 2014	N/A
Chris has a buyer in town with a significant list of requirements. Meanwhile, Chad lists a Miami real estate legend's property, but things get heated when he clashes with Sam at the open house.
5	"Relationship Negotiation"	July 23, 2014	N/A
Chad tries to work with his co-listing agent who is not giving him full control. Chris helps out a friend looking to sell her penthouse, and ends up negotiating for more than he expected.
6	"Three's a Crowd"	July 30, 2014	0.72
Chris, Chad, and Sam find themselves all competing for a monumental listing at a new development, which brings two of the agents surprisingly close together.
7	"Going Big"	August 6, 2014	N/A
Chad's future is about to change in more ways than one. His biggest client is in town and ready to go on a $20 million spending spree.
8	"Past, Present, Future"	August 13, 2014	N/A
Chad picks up right where he left off with his proposal to Jen, and still has $9 million in property to purchase for his biggest client.
