= Platt Music =

The Platt Music Corporation, founded by Benjamin Platt in 1905, was a national retailer.

In 1984, Michael Glazer became chairman and chairman executive of Platt Music. Tom Bagan, president and COO of Chicago retail giant Marshall Field's became president and COO of The Platt Music Corporation. The Platt Music Company Building, constructed in 1927 and designed by architects Walker + Eisen, was located at 834 S. Broadway in downtown Los Angeles.
