= Madison Hildebrand =

American media personality and realtor

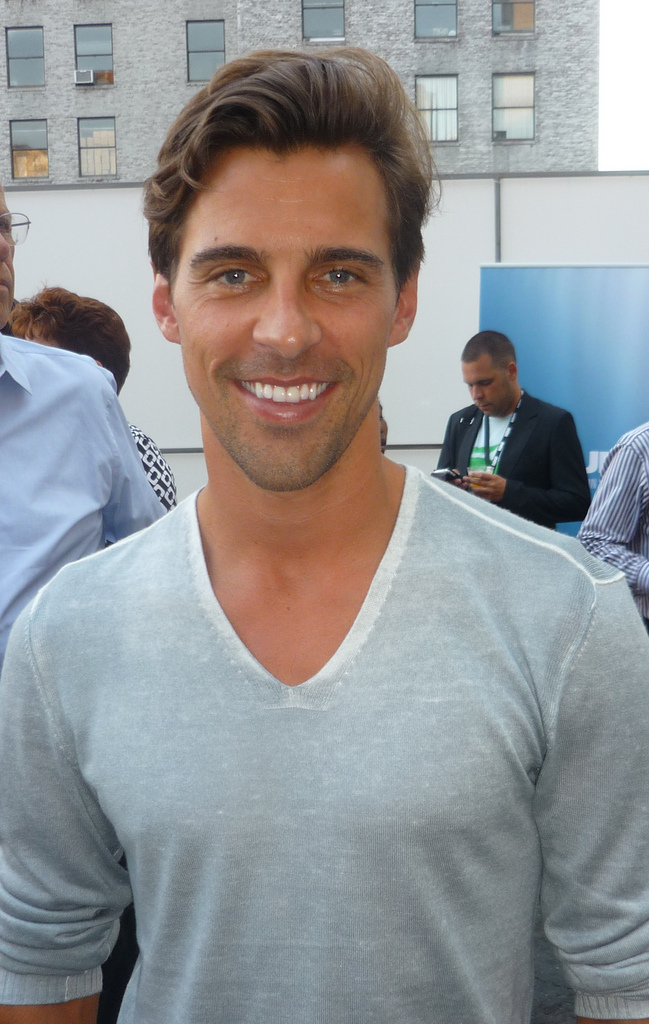
- Born: October 28, 1980 (age 45); Mesa, Arizona, U.S.
- Occupations: Real estate broker, author

Madison Pomeroy Hildebrand (born October 28, 1980) is an American media personality and realtor specializing in the luxury real estate market located in Malibu, California. A broker with Partners Trust Real Estate, Hildebrand formerly co-starred in the Bravo television series Million Dollar Listing Los Angeles, alongside Josh Flagg and Josh Altman. In 2009, Hildebrand released a book, Activate Your Passion, Create Your Career. In 2013, Hildebrand launched a scented candle collection called The Malibu Life By Madison Hildebrand. He is also a brand ambassador for the eSignature company, DocuSign, and produces a national seminar tour where Hildebrand coaches realtors across the country.

== Personal life ==
Hildebrand graduated from Pepperdine University, in Malibu. Openly gay, having come out in December 2009, Hildebrand appeared on The Millionaire Matchmaker looking for love. His brother, John Hildebrand, is the owner of Sicky's Eyewear. Hildebrand is an inactive member of the Church of Jesus Christ of Latter-day Saints.
