= Million Dollar Listing Los Angeles =

- Also known as: Million Dollar Listing
- Genre: Reality
- Starring: Josh Flagg; Josh Altman; Tracy Tutor
- Country of origin: United States
- Original language: English
- No. of seasons: 15
- No. of episodes: 166 (list of episodes)

Production
- Executive producers: Randy Barbato; Fenton Bailey
- Running time: 42–44 minutes
- Production company: World of Wonder Productions

Original release
- Network: Bravo
- Release: August 29, 2006 – September 11, 2024

Related
- Million Dollar Listing New York; Million Dollar Listing Miami; Million Dollar Listing San Francisco; Million Dollar Listing India

Million Dollar Listing Los Angeles (previously Million Dollar Listing) is an American reality television series that premiered on Bravo on August 29, 2006. The series chronicles the professional and personal lives of realtors in the real estate Industry based in Beverly Hills, Hollywood and Malibu as they sell high-end properties. It also gives viewers an inside look at the world of high-priced real estate in Los Angeles County.

The success of the series has resulted in three spin-offs; New York, Miami and San Francisco.

== Current realtors ==
- Josh Flagg, 2008–present
- Josh Altman, 2011–2024
- Tracy Tutor, 2017–present

== Production ==
The series was announced on July 15, 2005, as Million Dollar Listing: Hollywood. The title would later change to Million Dollar Listing and premiered on August 29, 2006. The first season encompasses two real estate agencies, one in Hollywood and one in Malibu. Numerous agents were featured during the season (including Madison Hildebrand, who appeared in later seasons). Episodes showcased real estate listings starting from the beginning of the selling process to close.

Season 2 premiered on August 5, 2008, almost two years after the prior season. The format of the program changed, focusing on specific agents as opposed to real estate companies. The season featured three Los Angeles real estate agents, Josh Flagg, Madison Hildebrand and Chad Rogers. Season 3 of Million Dollar Listing premiered on October 12, 2009 and examines the falling real estate market and the three agents' tactics in staying afloat. The fourth season premiered on February 3, 2011 and featured agents Josh Flagg, Madison Hildebrand and a new agent, Josh Altman replacing Chad Rogers.

The show title was officially changed to Million Dollar Listing Los Angeles after the premiere of Million Dollar Listing New York, with the fifth-season premiere on June 6, 2012. Season 6 premiered on August 7, 2013 and averaged 1.3 million total viewers, compared to season five which averaged over 1 million total viewers. Season 7 premiered on August 20, 2014, with James Harris and David Parnes joining the cast and Hildebrand departing. Season 8 premiered on September 2, 2015. The ninth season premiered on October 6, 2016 with Madison Hildebrand returning as a full-time cast member. The tenth season premiered on November 2, 2017 with Tracy Tutor Maltas joining the cast. In April 2018, the show was renewed for an eleventh season. Madison Hildebrand confirmed that he would not return for the eleventh season. The eleventh season premiered on January 3, 2019.

On April 30, 2020, it was announced that the twelfth season will premiere on June 16, 2020. The entire season 11 cast returned while the season also featured an appearance by New York broker Fredrik Eklund. The thirteenth season premiered on September 2, 2021 with Fredrik Eklund joining the cast. On April 8, 2022, it was announced that there would be a fourteenth season with Fredrik Eklund, James Harris and David Parnes departing the series. The fourteenth season premiered on December 8, 2022; featuring Flagg, Altman and Tutor. The fifteenth season premiered on July 10, 2024. On October 31, 2024, both Josh and Heather Altman announced their departure from the series after 13 years. The series has not been renewed for a 16th season and production has been paused.

== Realtors ==
The current cast consists of Josh Flagg, Josh Altman and Tracy Tutor. Previously featured realtors include Carol Bird, Scotty Brown, Chase Campen, Chris Cortazzo, Madison Hildebrand, Shannon McLeod, Chad Rogers, Dia Schuldenfrei, Ray Schuldenfrei, Lydia Simon, James Harris, David Parnes and Fredrik Eklund.

=== Realtor timeline ===
Realtor	Seasons														
Realtor	1	2	3	4	5	6	7	8	9	10	11	12	13	14	15
Madison Hildebrand	Main						Friend		Main						
Carol Bird	Main														
Scotty Brown	Main														
Chase Campen	Main														
Chris Cortazzo	Main														
Shannon McLeod	Main														
Dia Schuldenfrei	Main														
Ray Schuldenfrei	Main														
Lydia Simon	Main														
Chad Rogers		Main													
Josh Flagg		Main													
Josh Altman				Main											
James Harris							Main								
David Parnes							Main								
Tracy Tutor										Main					
Fredrik Eklund												Guest	Main		

== Special seasons ==
=== Josh & Josh ===
After the premiere of the show's thirteenth season, Bravo announced a four-part limited series titled Million Dollar Listing Los Angeles: Josh & Josh, which features Josh Altman and Josh Flagg. The series chronicles the high-end properties sold by both Altman and Flagg outside of Los Angeles, including Napa, Aspen, and Newport Beach, whilst detailing the personal drama and moments in each other's lives. They are both joined by their respective loved ones, Heather Altman and Bobby Boyd.

== Episodes ==
Season	Episodes	Originally released	
Season	Episodes	First released	Last released
1	6	August 29, 2006	October 3, 2006
2	6	August 5, 2008	September 9, 2008
3	9	October 12, 2009	December 11, 2009
4	9	February 3, 2011	March 29, 2011
5	10	June 6, 2012	August 15, 2012
6	12	August 7, 2013	October 23, 2013
7	12	August 20, 2014	November 5, 2014
8	14	September 2, 2015	December 9, 2015
9	12	October 6, 2016	December 29, 2016
10	12	November 2, 2017	January 25, 2018
11	12	January 3, 2019	March 28, 2019
12	12	June 16, 2020	September 1, 2020
13	14	September 2, 2021	December 16, 2021
Josh & Josh	4	December 23, 2021	January 13, 2022
14	12	December 8, 2022	March 2, 2023
15	10	July 10, 2024	September 11, 2024
