= The Real Housewives of Orange County season 7 =

Season of television series

The Real Housewives of Orange County
- Season 7
- Cover used by iTunes (Left to right) Rossi, Bellino, Dubrow, Gunvalson, and Judge
- Starring: Vicki Gunvalson; Tamra Judge; Gretchen Rossi; Alexis Bellino; Heather Dubrow
- No. of episodes: 23

Release
- Original network: Bravo
- Original release: February 7 – July 24, 2012

Season chronology
- ← Previous; Season 6 Next → Season 8

The seventh season of The Real Housewives of Orange County, an American reality television series, was broadcast on Bravo. It aired from February 7, 2012 until July 24, 2012, and was primarily filmed in Orange County, California. Its executive producers are Adam Karpel, Alex Baskin, Douglas Ross, Gregory Stewart, Scott Dunlop, Stephanie Boyriven and Andy Cohen.

The Real Housewives of Orange County focuses on the lives of Vicki Gunvalson, Tamra Barney, Gretchen Rossi, Alexis Bellino and Heather Dubrow. It consisted of 23 episodes.

== Production and crew ==
In August 2011, The Real Housewives of Orange County was renewed for a seventh season and in December 2011, it was revealed that it was slated to air in February the following year. The season premiere "Stranger Things Have Happened" was aired on February 7, 2012, while the twentieth episode "Are You in or Out?" served as the season finale, and was aired on June 26, 2012. It was followed by a two-part reunion that aired on July 10 and July 16, 2012 and a "Lost Footage" special on July 24, 2012, which marked the conclusion of the season. Adam Karpel, Alex Baskin, Douglas Ross, Gregory Stewart, Scott Dunlop, Stephanie Boyriven and Andy Cohen are recognized as the series' executive producers; it is produced and distributed by Evolution Media.

== Cast and synopsis ==
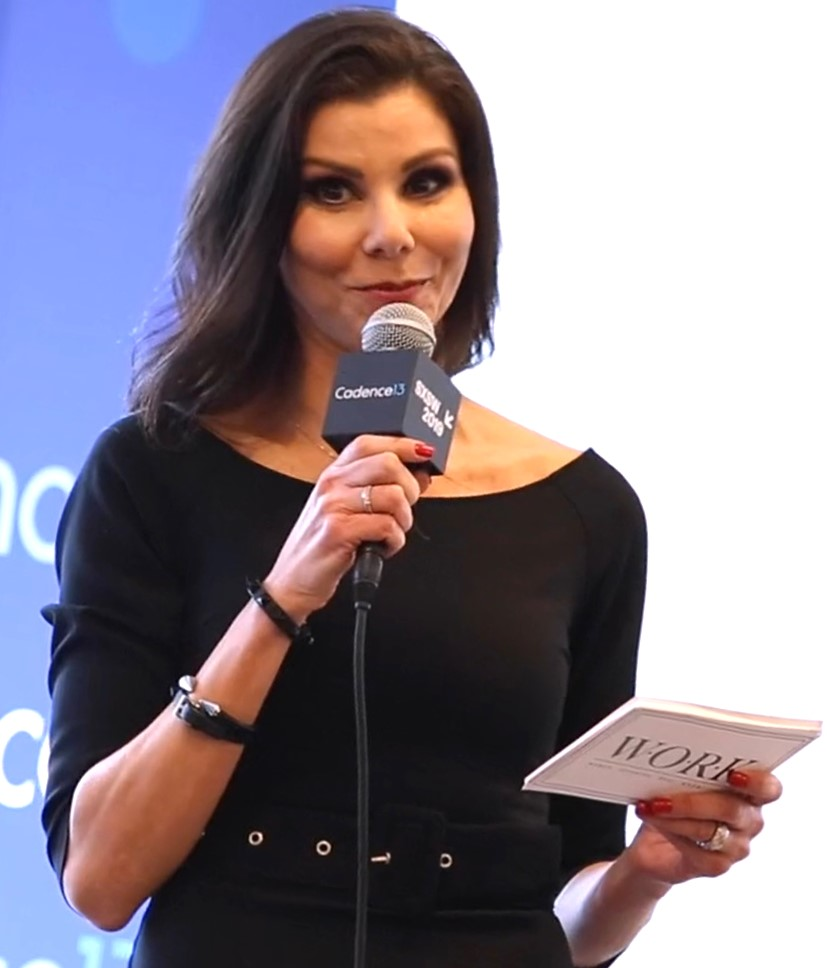
Season seven addition, Heather Dubrow

Four of the fives housewives featured on the sixth season of The Real Housewives of Orange County returned for the seventh installment. The season saw Peggy Tanous departing the series by her own choice, but continued to make guest appearances throughout the season. In April 2014, Tanous revealed leaving the series alleviated a lot of her anxiety. Also departing the series were season six recurring cast members, Jeana Keough and Fernanda Rocha, however Keough returns in several guest appearances. Filling Tanous' place in the series is Heather Dubrow who is described as a "former actress and now stay-at-home mother of four, who's married to a prominent Newport Beach plastic surgeon," Terry Dubrow.

Vicki Gunvalson's divorce from Donn continues to process as she and her boyfriend Brooks Ayers are met with resistance from friends and family which forever damage Gunvalson's relationships. Vicki puts her home up for sale as she ventures in to her new life. Tamra Barney's relationship with her boyfriend Eddie Judge becomes increasingly serious. The relationship continues to develop after a trip in Bora Bora when Eddie proposes. Barney continues to sell houses to support herself, which include trying to sell to the new wife Dubrow. Barney and Gretchen Rossi form an unexpected friendship despite years of feuding which places a strain on Barney's friendship with Gunvalson, and Rossi's relationships with Alexis Bellino and Slade Smiley. Rossi performs with The Pussycat Dolls with the intention of jump-starting a career in the entertainment industry. Rossi's feud with Gunvalson worsens as Smiley makes fun of the housewives during his comedy routine. Bellino begins her new role as a morning news correspondent with the intention to one day host her own talk show. Bellino's lifestyle comes into question from the other ladies after they deem it "phony" and attempt an intervention. Dubrow raises her four children with her plastic surgeon husband Terry. Heather's "picture perfect life" leaves Alexis feeling competitive and jealous. Heather attempts to get back into acting by heading to an audition.

== Episodes ==
The Real Housewives of Orange County season 7 episodes
No. overall	No. in season	Title	Original release date	U.S. viewers (millions)
79	1	"Stranger Things Have Happened"	February 7, 2012	2.26
In the seventh season premiere, the women find themselves dealing with lingering drama from last year. As Vicki finalizes her divorce, she's focused on finding happiness, starting with putting the house up for sale and spending time with her new man, Brooks. Busy mom Alexis has a new job as a morning news show correspondent and after a three-year feud, Tamra and Gretchen meet to bury the hatchet. Tamra continues to sell real estate to help make ends meet and shows a very expensive property to filthy rich Heather Dubrow – a former actress, now mother of four – whom she later invites to a dinner party at Vicki's house. With tensions high and patience low, Peggy and Alexis come face to face for the first time since last year's bombshell revelation that Peggy dated Alexis' husband.
80	2	"Southern Hospitality"	February 14, 2012	1.69
At Vicki's tension-filled dinner party, Peggy and Alexis reach a boiling point and Peggy decides to close the chapter on her friendship with Alexis and the other women. Gretchen poses for a nude photo shoot for a charitable cause, while OC's newest housewife, Heather, has it all and isn't afraid to let everyone know it. Meanwhile, Vicki and Tamra go on an overnight trip to Catalina with their boyfriends that nearly ends before it begins when Tamra overreacts and puts Brooks in an embarrassing situation.
81	3	"The Honeymoon Is Over"	February 21, 2012	2.05
New housewife Heather throws a "painting party" to get to know the ladies better. In between brush strokes, Alexis and Vicki make snide remarks to Gretchen and Tamra about their budding friendship and Alexis is green with envy of Heather's picture-perfect life. After the party, Gretchen and Slade dig up questionable information about Vicki's new boyfriend that is sure to send shockwaves through the OC.
82	4	"Who's Laughing Now?"	February 28, 2012	1.66
Tamra tries to convince Vicki that her friendship with Gretchen won't overshadow their bond, while on the other side of town, Alexis and Heather meet for a doomed lunch to try and work out their differences. Vicki and her daughter Briana have a heart-to-heart about Vicki's new boyfriend and Briana informs her mother of an upcoming surgery she must undergo. Meanwhile, Slade is trying out a new career – comedy – and against Gretchen's wishes, his routine at the Improv is laden with Housewife-insulting jokes.
83	5	"He Said What?"	March 6, 2012	1.81
Heather tells Tamra that she and Vicki were the butt of Slade's jokes in his insulting comedy routine and Tamra doesn't think it's funny at all. When Tamra tells Vicki about Slade's comedy routine, she feels insulted, but is distracted by her daughter Briana's upcoming thyroid surgery, which could reveal if she has cancer. Alexis works herself into frenzy over her upcoming nose surgery because she's convinced that her doctor must remove her nose entirely from her face to take off the bump. At Tamra's '80s-themed Bunco Party, a friend brings up Slade's jokes and a simmering controversy explodes into full-on conflict. While Gretchen jumps to Slade's defense, Tamra tries to defuse the situation by revealing a surprise – much to Vicki's horror.
84	6	"The Party's Over"	March 13, 2012	2.10
The Bunco Party takes an uncomfortable turn when Slade and some of the OC men, invited by Tamra, join the party. Confronted immediately about the insulting things he said about Vicki in his comedy routine, Slade aggressively defends himself. Vicki tries to make a graceful exit but soon finds herself drawn back inside to have the last word. Jumping to Slade's defense, Gretchen and Vicki get into a vicious screaming match, where Gretchen accuses Vicki of being a hypocrite. And just when everyone thinks the drama is over, Alexis gets defensive when Tamra and Heather call her out on her upcoming nose job. Later, once the party drama has passed, Alexis goes in for her surgery and Vicki's daughter Briana heads to the hospital to have her thyroid removed, fearing the worst – cancer.
85	7	"Under The Knife"	March 20, 2012	2.05
A nervous Alexis undergoes sinus surgery, where her plastic surgeon also removes a bump from her nose. Meanwhile, Vicki is distraught as Briana's thyroid surgery went worse than expected. Tamra visits her doctor and decides to have her breast implants removed. Then, Heather plans a glamorous trip to L.A. to get some advice on opening a restaurant, but who needs freeways when you can take a helicopter? Gretchen watches a rehearsal of the Pussycat Dolls in preparation for her Las Vegas debut, but realizes that she might be in over her head.
86	8	"Dirty Housewives"	April 3, 2012	1.76
Vicki finally gets answers about Briana's health, while Alexis endures the agony of getting her nose cast removed. Meanwhile, Tamra, Gretchen and Heather participate in a "Mud Run" for charity, and injuries are a plenty. Finally, filled with unexpected emotion, Tamra hesitates when finalizing her divorce from Simon.
87	9	"Bowling For Champs"	April 10, 2012	1.85
Both Tamra and Vicki's romantic relationships are moving full speed ahead. While Eddie stands by Tamra's side through her breast implant removal surgery, Vicki shares very personal information with Brooks. Meanwhile, Alexis continues her work at the local news station, but Jim wants her to return to being a full-time, stay-at-home mom. Later, Heather invites the housewives to a fun night of bowling and champagne, but chaos ensues when Gretchen's friend, Sarah erratically confronts Vicki.
88	10	"Cabin Fever"	April 17, 2012	1.77
Alexis plans a glamorous camping (aka "glamping") trip near Santa Barbara for all the girls, but with her Pussycat Dolls performance only days away, Gretchen decides to skip the trip. Tamra, also staying home as she recovers from her breast implant removal surgery, is paid a visit by Vicki, who reveals that she's becoming friends with Alexis. Skeptical of this newfound friendship, Tamra doesn't believe for one second that Vicki will survive a night with Alexis in the woods. During the glamping trip, will the housewives relish nature or long for the luxuries they're accustomed to?
89	11	"What's New, Pussycat?"	April 24, 2012	1.92
No longer content staying home with the kids full-time, Heather heads to Hollywood for an audition, but finds herself conflicted about being a working actress raising four children. Meanwhile, Alexis wants to hire a coach to help her reach her dreams of hosting her own television show, but Jim doesn't lend his support. Later, Gretchen is finally ready to perform with the Pussycat Dolls in Las Vegas, and all the ladies are there to support her. However, a difficult rehearsal could spell disaster for the big night.
90	12	"Bombs Away"	May 1, 2012	2.04
In Las Vegas, an anxious Gretchen performs with the Pussycat Dolls in front of all the other housewives – will she shine or bomb? Back in Orange County, Tamra is all about opening her own business, figuring out if she'll have to stretch her small budget to achieve her dream of opening a gym. Despite Jim's objections, Alexis continues to follow her career aspirations, meeting with a talent coach to hone her hosting skills. Meanwhile, Heather and Terry join Gretchen and Slade for a couple's dinner, and Gretchen is shocked to hear Terry call Alexis phony. Later, Vicki takes Briana and her new man, Ryan, to dinner where Briana drops a huge bombshell, leaving Vicki speechless.
91	13	"Whine & Cheese"	May 8, 2012	1.85
Slade has a serious conversation with Gretchen's dad that leaves him caught off-guard. Meanwhile, Gretchen expresses to Tamra her hesitation of ever marrying Slade. Vicki and Tamra host a formal wine party where Vicki announces Briana's big news. But just before the party ends on a happy note, Vicki forces an awkward meeting between her new beau Brooks and her reluctant daughter Briana that does more harm than good.
92	14	"Happily Never After"	May 15, 2012	1.91
Slade enlists Heather to go engagement ring shopping with him, but Gretchen and Heather's subsequent conversation seems sure to throw Slade's plans for a loop. Alexis throws an over the top birthday party for her four-year-old twins, while Tamra goes under the knife to have her "Simon" tattoo removed from her finger. Later, Vicki has a gut wrenching, blowout fight with Briana that could forever damage their relationship.
93	15	"Scream Therapy"	May 22, 2012	1.91
Brooks lends his support to Vicki in the aftermath of her argument with Briana, but the mother-daughter rift pushes Vicki over the edge. Tamra sits down with Slade to hash out their past, but will they forgive and forget? Heather decides to surprise Terry by finally taking his last name. Later, Gretchen and Slade seek couple's counseling while Alexis attempts to mend fences with Tamra – neither effort goes well.
94	16	"Rumble in the Jungle"	May 29, 2012	2.07
It's fish-out-of-water time as the ladies travel to the rainforest of Costa Rica. Zip lining through the jungle canopy has the OC ladies screaming with excitement, while their shifting friendships have them screaming at each other. Vicki's erratic behavior has the others worried that she's having a mental breakdown, while the collective whip comes down hard on Alexis as the group conducts a "makeshift intervention" to confront her on her phony lifestyle.
95	17	"Monkey Business"	June 5, 2012	1.88
The tension in Costa Rica heats up as Alexis fights off Heather and Tamra's accusations that she is phony. But when her good friend Gretchen jumps in with her own accusations, Alexis' fighting spirit breaks and with hurt feelings, she departs the trip early. Meanwhile, the remaining women get wild on a white water rafting trip through the jungle that shakes Vicki to the core, resulting in a bizarre emotional breakdown.
96	18	"Will He or Won't He?"	June 12, 2012	1.77
Alexis faces her biggest test yet: reporting on-location for her final Fox 5 news segment, while Vicki pushes Brooks to fix his teeth. Meanwhile, Gretchen accidentally uncovers Slade’s plan to propose, leading to a confrontation that puts them over the edge. Then, Tamra gets a shock of her own when Eddie surprises her with a romantic trip to Bora Bora, leaving her wondering what he’s got up his sleeve.
97	19	"Let Them Eat Cake"	June 19, 2012	1.96
All the women attend an extravagant party at Heather's house to celebrate her new last name. Vicki flaunts an expensive gift from Brooks, while tension still runs high with her and Briana. Alexis faces Gretchen and the other women for the first time since Costa Rica. Tamra is having a good time until Jeana shows up, re-opening old wounds. And then drama hits an all-time high when Gretchen's friend Sarah commits the ultimate party foul, spinning everything and everyone out of control.
98	20	"Are You in or Out?"	June 26, 2012	2.50
The drama continues at Heather's opulent party in this season's finale. Sarah's bizarre actions force Heather to take drastic action. Tamra and Gretchen commemorate their new friendship with a heartfelt gift. Alexis' husband, Jim, crashes the party and confronts Heather's husband, Terry, about calling Alexis phony. Meanwhile, Brooks instigates an explosive fight between Vicki and Tamra that leaves the future of their friendship in doubt.
99	21	"Reunion: Part 1"	July 10, 2012	2.51
After the most dramatic season to date, the O.C. ladies come together again for laughter, fighting and tears. Alexis is in the hot seat when she demands an apology from the ladies for calling her phony. An all-out war results when Tamra, Heather, and Gretchen point out examples of Alexis' insincerity and Vicki comes to her defense. Meanwhile, Gretchen accuses Vicki of being a hypocrite regarding her relationship with Brooks, leaving Vicki feeling backed into a corner with almost no support.
100	22	"Reunion: Part 2"	July 16, 2012	1.94
In part two of The Real Housewives of Orange County reunion, Vicki's relationship with Brooks takes center stage when he stops by to give the ladies a piece of his mind. When Briana joins the group, Vicki's fidelity and Brooks' motives are called into question as accusations against the couple arise. By the end of the reunion, friendships are frayed, new alliances are formed, and the women's relationships with one another may never be the same again.
101	23	"Lost Footage Special"	July 24, 2012	1.42
In the seventh season's "Lost Footage Special," we see never-aired housewife happenings including make-ups, shake-ups and exclusive moments from the reunion. Unlikely pairings include a double date with Vicki, Brooks, Gretchen and Slade, and Tamra meets an old foe for drinks. Heather and Alexis each pursue their dream careers, while Tamra comes to terms with her son Ryan's skepticism about her engagement. Serious showdowns at the reunion arise over the wives' various plastic surgeries and a special visitor drops by.
