= The Real Housewives of Orange County season 8 =

Season of television series

The Real Housewives of Orange County
- Season 8
- Cover used by iTunes (Left to right) Bellino, Dubrow, Rossi, Gunvalson, McLaughlin, and Judge
- Starring: Vicki Gunvalson; Tamra Judge; Gretchen Rossi; Alexis Bellino; Heather Dubrow; Lydia McLaughlin
- No. of episodes: 22

Release
- Original network: Bravo
- Original release: April 1 – September 1, 2013

Season chronology
- ← Previous; Season 7 Next → Season 9

The eighth season of The Real Housewives of Orange County, an American reality television series, was broadcast on Bravo. It aired from April 1, 2013, until September 1, 2013, and was primarily filmed in Orange County, California. Its executive producers are Adam Karpel, Alex Baskin, Douglas Ross, Gregory Stewart, Scott Dunlop, Stephanie Boyriven and Andy Cohen.

The Real Housewives of Orange County focuses on the lives of Vicki Gunvalson, Tamra Barney, Gretchen Rossi, Alexis Bellino, Heather Dubrow and Lydia McLaughlin. It consisted of 22 episodes.

This season marked the final regular appearances of Gretchen Rossi and Alexis Bellino. This season also marked the first departure of Lydia McLaughlin. She eventually returned for the show's 12th season.

== Production and crew ==
In September 2012, Alexis Bellino revealed that The Real Housewives of Orange County had been renewed for an eighth season. In February 2013, the official cast, trailer and premiered date were announced. The season premiere "Bullies and Babies" was aired on April 1, 2013, while the twentieth episode "Cold Shoulders" served as the season finale, and was aired on August 5, 2013. It was followed by a three-part reunion that aired on August 12, August 19 and August 26, 2013 and a "Secrets Revealed" episode on September 1, 2013, which marked the conclusion of the season. Adam Karpel, Alex Baskin, Douglas Ross, Gregory Stewart, Scott Dunlop, Stephanie Boyriven and Andy Cohen are recognized as the series' executive producers; it is produced and distributed by Evolution Media.

The following day after the final episode of season eight, the second spin-off to The Real Housewives of Orange County titled Tamra's OC Wedding premiered on Bravo, starring Barney and Eddie Judge. The series documented the couple as they prepared for their wedding and as well as the wedding day itself. The three-part miniseries chronicles the weeks prior to the couple's wedding as well as the wedding itself — which took place on June 15, 2013, at the Monarch Beach Resort in Dana Point, California. After the wedding and in future seasons, Barney is now known as Tamra Judge.

On July 13, 2016, Bravo aired a "Special Episode" that featured a never before seen look at season eight. All the cast members, full-time and recurring, returned to discuss the events that occurred during the season. After the episode aired, Gretchen Rossi claimed she was unhappy with the way the episode was edited to make her look like a liar. Rossi claimed she would be seeking legal action and might leak the emails she allegedly had from her time on the series.

== Cast and synopsis ==
All fives housewives featured on the seventh season of The Real Housewives of Orange County returned for the eighth instalment. With the five former wives returning, the season also featured a new wife, Lydia McLaughlin. McLaughlin is described as a "fresh-faced, level headed and surprisingly direct OC heiress" as well as a "young, kooky mother always puts her family and faith first." Along with all the housewives returning, former housewife Lauri Peterson returned in a recurring capacity. Peterson returned supporting Tamra Barney with her wedding duties as well as revealing some gossip about Vicki Gunvalson.

Although Alexis Bellino returned for the eighth season, in September 2012, she originally quit after the seventh due to no longer wanting to be around the drama and bullying. Bellino allegedly received a call from the producers asking her to reconsider and after thinking about it, she decided to return to the series. Bellino claims the reason for her return was to set an example for her kids and to prove bullies don't win saying "do I really want my children to think that mommy quit her career or that mommy let those bullies win? No. I’m going to go back and fight and make my statement."

Barney and Judge take the next step in their relationship when they move in together as they prepare for their upcoming nuptials. Her and the other ladies head to Mexico for her bachelorette party. The bachelorette events prepared by Heather Dubrow and Gretchen Rossi don't go to plan when Vicki Gunvalson steps in and takes control to make things more fun. This marks the beginning of an end of Barney and Rossi newly formed friendship. Barney and Judge mix personal with business as they arrange for the opening of their fitness studio Cut Fitness. Barney opens old wounds when she speaks at the Los Angeles Women's Expo, where details of her past that she has kept secret for years. Bellino becomes friends with Gunvalson after feeling isolated from several of the housewives. Her isolation with the other wives worsens at a dinner at Barney's gym, where Bellino reveals she has had to go on Xanax due to the "bullying." McLaughlin disagrees with Bellino's choice of words which creates a divide in their friendship and leaves the other wives seeing McLaughlin as her own person and not just Bellino's friend. Away from the drama, Bellino and her husband relish in their marriage with salsa dancing and opening a new trampoline park. McLaughlin and her husband Doug connect with the Bellinos over their shared devotion to Christianity. McLaughlin and her mom celebrate her newfound sobriety with marijuana, but some wounds from her childhood haven't healed. McLaughlin and her husband run are magazine editors for Beverly Hills Lifestyle Magazine, but not offering Dubrow the cover causes tension between to two wives. Dubrow re-establishes her presence in the entertainment industry after securing recurring positions in the television series Hot in Cleveland and Malibu Country, however her husband doesn't seem as excited. The Dubrows argue about Terry's lack of excitement and support for Heather which leaves Terry using the word "divorce." Gunvalson embraces being a grandmother to Briana's newborn son Troy. Gunvalson's relationship with Ayers becomes increasingly turbulent, especially when Gunvalson's son-in-law drops a bomb about Ayers. Gunvalson recently had plastic surgery on her face, but it soon becomes the talk center of gossip. Rossi reconsiders marriage and beginning a family after her relationship with Slade becomes more stable due to Slade getting work at a radio station. Later in the season Rossi takes the plunge and proposes to Slade in a big celebration involving a song, helicopters and his family.

== Episodes ==
The Real Housewives of Orange County season 8 episodes
No. overall	No. in season	Title	Original release date	U.S. viewers (millions)
102	1	"Bullies and Babies"	April 1, 2013	1.81
Tamra packs up all her things and moves in with her new business partner and fiancée, Eddie. Vicki is ecstatic to become a grandmother after her daughter Briana gives birth to a baby boy. Gretchen is left to deal with her businesses alone after her boyfriend Slade leaves to acquire a career on his own. Heather invites all the ladies over for a clam bake but Alexis is left uninvited. The gathering erupts in drama after Tamra and Vicki see each other for the first time since the reunion, 4 months earlier.
103	2	"Evil Eyes and Evil Faces"	April 8, 2013	1.59
Heather's clam bake keeps going, and Vicki's new face is the talk of the evening. After a confrontation and revealing dinner, Tamra and Vicki try to fix their broken friendship. Terry's constant need to say jokes rubs Heather the wrong way. Meanwhile, Alexis and Jim's ballroom dancing lesson provides them with time to escape the drama. While taking some time off, Gretchen decides to pay Slade a supporting visit at the radio station. Tamra gets more than she hoped when Eddie discusses his concern with Vicki.
104	3	"Making Up Is Hard to Do"	April 15, 2013	1.60
Alexis is honored when Vicki invites her over to be the first of the group that meets her grandson, Troy. Gretchen and Tamra go shopping for baby gift. Tamra keeps trying to improve her friendship with Vicki but Vicki is determined to ruin it all. Heather meets with Lydia McLaughlin to discuss her home being featured in Lydia's magazine but Heather won't agree unless she's featured on the cover.
105	4	"It's My Party and I'll Scream if I Want to"	April 22, 2013	1.71
Tamara informs Vicki that it's okay to invite Alexis to Tamra's new gym, which shocks both Vicki and Alexis. Lydia is invited to Tamra's party, not by Tamra herself, but rather by her old friend Alexis Bellino. Gretchen and Slade work to sustain a healthy relationship by solving personal issues. On the night of the party, Tamra is unsure if inviting Alexis was a mistake after drama erupts.
106	5	"The Party Is DONE!"	April 29, 2013	1.85
Once Tamra is pushed to her limit, Alexis is escorted out and drama erupts. Vicki is torn between two friends. Alexis feels that she's being bullied by the ladies, which leads to Lydia voicing her opinion of the matter. Later, Gretchen flies to New York in order to provide moral support for Slade. Lydia's advice to Alexis is to attempt to talk everything out and make things right. Vicki's son-in-law reveals information about Brooks.
107	6	"A Star Is Reborn?"	May 6, 2013	1.96
Alexis has a difficult time trying to forgive the ladies. Tamra's fresh drama-free friendship with Vicki ends up in turmoil after Vicki doesn't show up to their new wine business event. Lydia celebrates her mother's new-found sober life from marijuana. Vicki works to get her family to think positively of Brooks. Gretchen has an emotional breakdown after thinking about her complicated future with Slade. Heather is offered a guest star role on Hot in Cleveland but the moment is disrupted when Terry wants to keep the spotlight on him.
108	7	"Whines by Wives"	May 13, 2013	1.81
Vicki and Tamra have a verbal altercation, which ends the wine-tasting trip. Alexis and Jim are finally able to open their trampoline park. Heather and Terry are in a tough spot after Terry reveals that he threatened to divorce Heather during a previous argument. Tamra believes that Eddie enjoys riding his bike more than spending time with her.
109	8	"Hot in Orange County"	May 20, 2013	1.85
Heather starts her first day filming her guest role on Hot in Cleveland and Terry is left at home with the children. The spotlight is on Gretchen and Slade after they are deemed inconsiderate on Heather's day. Alexis feels that it's time to jump-start her acting career. After seeing her mother smoke marijuana for years, Lydia feels it's time to confront her mother about the habit.
110	9	"Speech Therapy"	May 27, 2013	1.67
Vicki has to make the decision to babysit her grandson or spend time with Brooks. Gretchen goes to an appointment with a fertility doctor. Lydia works as a mediator and persuades Alexis to meet with Tamra. Later, Tamra attends the Los Angeles Women's Expo, where she was invited to give a speech.
111	10	"Viva Mexico"	June 3, 2013	1.85
Lydia is invited over to Tamra's house for the first time, where Lydia is able to persuade Tamra into meeting up with Alexis to resolve their issues. Gretchen and Heather meet to go over the plans regarding Tamra's upcoming bachelorette trip to Puerto Vallarta, Mexico. Orange County housewife Lauri Peterson meets with Gretchen at her ranch and the two discuss Vicki's scandalous past. The ladies arrive in Mexico, enjoy a nice dinner then Vicki, Lydia and Tamra leave Gretchen and Heather in the limo while they go out and explore the town.
112	11	"Dirty Dancing in Mexico"	June 10, 2013	1.77
While still in Puerto Vallarta, Vicki, Lydia and Tamra continue their night away partying — while Heather and Gretchen continue to sit back in the limo. Gretchen tells Vicki how much she was annoyed by her antics but Tamra shocks the ladies when she tells the specifics of her past to Gretchen. Back at the resort, Mexican strippers arrive to spice up the night but Lydia is a bit nervous about the whole situation. Alexis, home in Orange County, asks Jim for an item that he is unwilling to purchase.
113	12	"Chicks and Salsa"	June 17, 2013	1.86
Heather and Alexis meet at the coffee house to fix their friendship. Briana prepares emotionally for Ryan's upcoming deployment. All the ladies, and husbands, come together for Lydia's salsa dance party but Lydia brings her claws out once Slade starts to make rude remarks. Brooks surprises Vicki at the party with flowers and the room begins to fill with rumors regarding her love life. Gretchen is told that Alexis will be at Tamra's wedding dress shopping trip and questions whether she will attend or not.
114	13	"100th Episode Special"	June 24, 2013	N/A
A celebration of the reality show's 100th episode featuring interviews with past and present Orange County wives, plus behind-the-scenes anecdotes and best-of clips.
115	14	"Wedding Dress Stress"	July 1, 2013	1.96
Heather receives a guest role on Malibu Country. Tamra checks up on the status of her fitness studio to find that construction is going slower than planned. The time has come for Tamra to start her wedding dress shopping, and Lauri is quick to reveal some gossip about Vicki. Heather and Tamra begin to feel unsure about Gretchen's honesty.
116	15	"The Cold War"	July 8, 2013	2.16
The ladies prepare for a trip to Whistler, Canada, planned by Lydia. While Alexis is praying for a drama-free trip, Gretchen and Heather argue over the topic of who received a role within a sitcom. Tamra gets word of the allegations Lauri is saying around town with Vicki as the main topic. Vicki is told of Lauri's antics by Tamra.
117	16	"Hold Your Tongue"	July 15, 2013	1.99
In the second part of the trip, Vicki has reached the limit with Lauri's gossip and an fit of rage ensues during dinner. Gretchen ends up being accused of lying by Tamra, which leads Gretchen to wonder if the two are true friends. While on a snowmobile activity, Tamra lets out some information while drinking. Meanwhile, at home in Orange County, Heather heads to the set of Malibu Country to shoot her scene.
118	17	"Crossroads"	July 22, 2013	2.03
Alexis comes face-to-face with Gretchen after avoiding drama this season. Lydia emerges herself in a bible study to recover from the drama of her Whistler trip with the ladies. Heather and Terry get an unexpected great deal to sell their home. Vicki takes Brooks on a business trip, where she struggles to keep things professional. Tamra confronts Eddie about setting a wedding date, while Gretchen plans a proposal where she will pop the question to Slade.
119	18	"An Immodest Proposal"	July 29, 2013	2.00
Heather and Terry's children aren't as excited as they are to move so in a creative way to motivate the children, the couple ask the kids what they think should be included in their new home. Slade is working at Radio Slade when his co-host surprises him with the song that Gretchen created, which leads to the second part of the surprise; Gretchen puts on her best Marilyn Monroe look to meet Slade on top of Downtown Los Angeles' AT&T building to propose. None of the housewives are invited to the engagement party that follows. Vicki invites Alexis and Lydia over to see her newly redecorated house, where the ladies tune in to Radio Slade. Vicki ends up hearing Slade refer to one of the ladies as "Tupperware Face", which Vicki takes offense to. While the ladies are visiting, Vicki also announced that she will be hosting a Winter Wonderland party, inspired by their recent trip to Canada. On the night of the party, Tamra gets to meet Vicki's grandson and give Vicki a present that showed she and Vicki were back to their old selves. Vicki reveals that she is back with Brooks. After Vicki's announcement, Tamra announces she and Eddie's wedding date. The group is discussing the things that Slade has said while Gretchen and Slade arrive to the party.
120	19	"Cold Shoulders"	August 5, 2013	2.38
As Vicki's party continues, Heather and Gretchen end up in a verbal altercation. Alexis can not handle the words that the ladies are saying to Jim, who hasn't seen the fellow housewives all year. Ryan, Briana's husband, gets in an argument with a guest. Gretchen and Tamra rehash the drama from their Canada trip. Lydia and Vicki confront Slade about the remarks that he said.
121	20	"Reunion: Part One"	August 12, 2013	2.12
Newest housewife, Lydia, is put on the spotlight when the ladies begin to question her about stirring the pot. Lauri attends the reunion to clear up the rumors regarding Vicki's cheating — which ends their friendship.Gretchen and Vicki bring up their past problems while fighting for Tamra's friendship.
122	21	"Reunion: Part Two"	August 19, 2013	2.08
Gretchen is forced to defend herself when accusations are made about forcing Alexis out of Tamra's wedding dress shopping. Heather later confronts Gretchen regarding the duos ongoing feud about their Malibu Country auditions. The ladies bring Gretchen to tears when the room becomes filled with negative things regarding Slade and their engagement.
123	22	"Reunion: Part Three"	August 26, 2013	2.30
In the final part of the reunion, Briana and Brooks are invited on set. The two end up in a verbal fighting match, with Vicki in tears.
124	23	"Secrets Revealed"	September 1, 2013	1.32
Andy Cohen opens up the Bravo vault to reveal the footage that didn't make it into this season. Scenes include: Alexis getting ready for her audition, Lydia revealing information about her and Doug, Gretchen and Vicki attempting to win Tamra's friendship.
