= Good Work (talk show) =

- Genre: Talk show
- Presented by: RuPaul; Terry Dubrow; Sandra Vergara
- Country of origin: United States
- Original language: English
- No. of seasons: 1
- No. of episodes: 6

Production
- Executive producers: Randy Barbato; Fenton Bailey; Tom Campbell; Mandy Salangsang
- Camera setup: Multiple
- Running time: 42 minutes
- Production company: World of Wonder Productions

Original release
- Network: E!
- Release: April 14 – May 19, 2015

Related
- Botched

Good Work is an American plastic surgery-themed talk show that premiered on April 14, 2015 on the E! cable network. Announced in March 2015, the one-hour roundtable television series features hosts RuPaul, Dr. Terry Dubrow and Sandra Vergara who discuss the "good work" and the "not so good work" of Hollywood celebrities regarding the quality of their plastic surgery.

== Co-hosts ==
- RuPaul, a television personality and actor, hosts the reality television show RuPaul's Drag Race;
- Terry Dubrow, a plastic surgeon and television personality; known for his work on The Swan and Botched, and appearing on The Real Housewives of Orange County;
- Sandra Vergara, an actress and a beauty expert.

== Episodes ==
No.	Title	Original release date	U.S. viewers (millions)
1	"Brandi Glanville & Tiffany New York Pollard"	April 14, 2015	0.76
Featuring guests include reality television stars Brandi Glanville, Tiffany "New York" Pollard and Heather Dubrow.
2	"Holly Madison & Jeannie Mai"	April 21, 2015	N/A
Featuring guests include television personalities Holly Madison and Jeannie Mai, and Chris Walton who is famous for having world's longest fingernails.
3	"Patti Stanger & Lauren Powers"	April 28, 2015	0.45
Featuring guests include television personality Patti Stanger and bodybuilder Lauren Powers.
4	"Kris Jenner & Lilly Ghalichi"	May 5, 2015	0.70
Featuring guests include reality television stars Kris Jenner, Lilly Ghalichi and Jenni Pulos.
5	"Amber Rose & Heather Dubrow"	May 12, 2015	0.60
Featuring guests include model Amber Rose, reality television personality Heather Dubrow, and Jana Stoner who has appeared on Botched for having breast implants in her buttocks.
6	"Porsha Williams & Olivia Culpo"	May 19, 2015	0.52
Featuring guests include reality television personality Porsha Williams, former Miss USA Olivia Culpo and YouTube celebrity Gigi Gorgeous.

== Broadcast ==
Good Work premiered on Tuesday, April 14, 2015, in the United States on the E! cable network at 10/9pm ET/PT, following another plastic surgery-based series Botched, which also features Terry Dubrow. The talk show continued to air on Tuesday nights and concluded on May 19, 2015. The series is additionally broadcast on local versions of the network worldwide; in Australia, the series premiered on April 22, 2015, and on May 5, 2015 in the United Kingdom.
