= Sandra Vergara =

Colombian actress

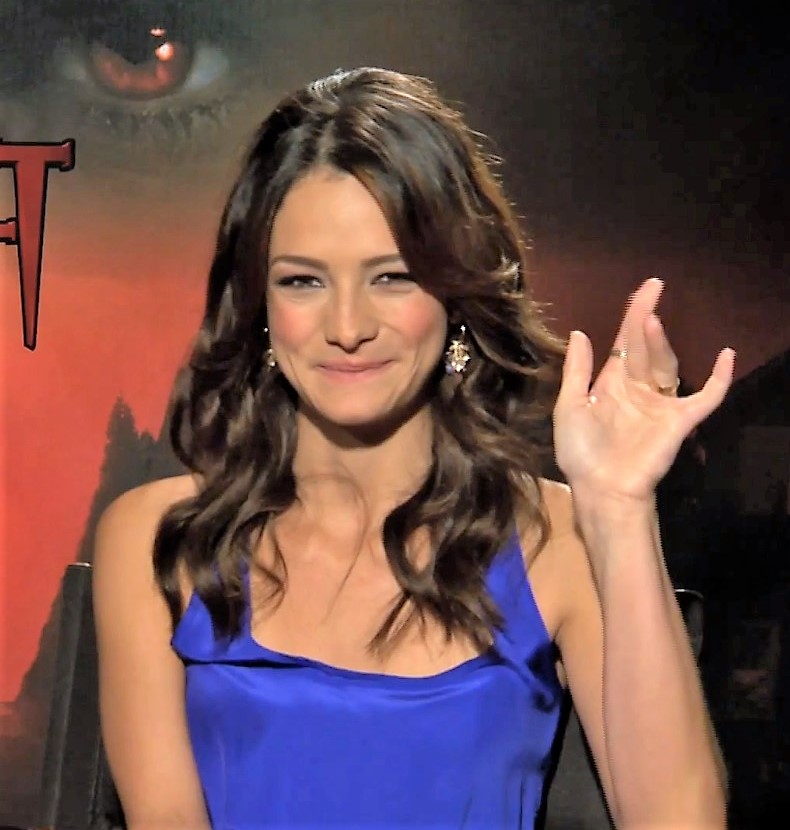
- Vergara interviewed by Dulce Osuna about Fright Night in 2011
- Born: Sandra Vergara Medina; September 11, 1988 (age 38); Barranquilla, Atlántico, Colombia
- Occupations: Actress, model
- Years active: 2004–present
- Relatives: Sofía Vergara (cousin/adoptive sister)

Sandra Vergara Medina (born September 11, 1988) is a Colombian actress, television host and model. Since 2020, she has served as a correspondent for People magazine‘s series People (The TV Show). She was also the co-host and beauty expert of Yahoo!'s digital series Hook'd.

== Early life ==
Sandra Vergara Medina was born on September 11, 1988, in Barranquilla, Atlántico, Colombia. Her mother, Margarita Vergara de Vergara, was a homemaker, and her father, Julio Enrique Vergara Robayo, was a cattle rancher for the meat industry. She is the sister of actress Sofía Vergara and singer Veronica Vergara. Upon arriving to Los Angeles, she lived with sister Sofia for four years and worked as a wardrobe stylist and makeup artist. She worked with several celebrity clients, such as Jordana Brewster, Asia Argento, Bijou Phillips, Casey Johnson and Rumer Willis.

== Career ==
Vergara started her modeling at age 24, and appeared in pictorials for Maxim, Esquire and Regard. In 2009, she portrayed Beauty in the CBS police procedural drama series CSI: Miami, in the episode "Head Case". In 2010, Vergara appeared in 40 episodes of the soap opera Chico de mi Barrio as Sofia. She appeared in the horror film Fright Night (2011) as Ginger. In March 2011, Vergara was cast in the pilot of NBC's Mann's World. In 2013, she landed the role of Theresa Corazon in six episodes of the soap opera The Bold and the Beautiful.

She had guest roles on television shows such as Nip/Tuck, Eleventh Hour and CSI: Crime Scene Investigation. In 2015, she became the beauty expert and co-host of E!'s talk show revolving around plastic surgery titled Good Work, alongside RuPaul and Terry Dubrow. The show featured the hosts and guests discussing the "good work" and the "not so good work" of Hollywood celebrities regarding the quality of their plastic surgery. In 2019, she became the co-host of Yahoo!’s digital series Hook’d and a regular contributor to Yahoo! Lifestyle digital.

In August 2020, Variety announced that Vergara is serving as a Los Angeles correspondent for People magazine‘s new series People (The TV Show). The series premiered on September 14, 2020, on People's website, other People platforms, and on Meredith’s local television markets.

== Filmography ==
Film
| Year | Film | Role | Notes |
|---|---|---|---|
| 2004 | Days of Santiago | Sandra | |
| 2009 | Los del Solar | Molly | |
| 2007 | Baila Reggaeton | Pamela | |
| 2011 | Mann's World | Tia | TV movie |
| 2011 | Fright Night | Ginger | |
| 2011 | God Bless America | Mercedes Paar | |
| 2012 | Dumb Girls | Marisol | TV movie |
| 2014 | Song From A Blackbird | Theater Presenter | Short film |
| 2022 | It's a Fat World | Claudia | |
Television
| Year | Title | Role | Notes |
| 2006 | Condominio S.A | Sandy | Episode: "Pilot" |
| 2007 | Baila Reggaeton | Pamela | |
| 2008 | Eleventh Hour | Hot Co-Ed | Episode: "Flesh" |
| 2009 | CSI: Miami | Beauty | Episode: "Head Case" |
| 2010 | Nip/Tuck | Aurelia Gallardo | Episode: "Virginia Hayes" |
| 2010 | Chico de mi Barrio | Sofia | Main cast; 40 episodes |
| 2012 | Fetching | Adi | Recurring role; 3 episodes |
| 2013 | CSI: Crime Scene Investigation | Silvana Cuerto | Episode: "Exile" |
| 2013 | The Bold and the Beautiful | Theresa Corazon | Recurring role; 6 episodes |
| 2015 | Good Work | Herself | Co-host and beauty expert; 6 episodes |
| 2019 | Señores Papis | Emma Díaz | 79 episodes |
| 2019–present | Hook'd | Herself | Yahoo! digital series; Co-host and beauty expert |
| 2020 | Dos Hermanas | Betsy Araníbar | 9 episodes |
| 2020–present | People (The TV Show) | Herself | Correspondent |
| 2025 | Selling Sunset | Herself | Main cast; 5 episodes |
