= The Real Housewives of Orange County season 9 =

Season of television series

The Real Housewives of Orange County
- Season 9
- Cover used by iTunes (Left to right) Beador, Judge, Gunvalson, Rovsek, and Dubrow
- Starring: Vicki Gunvalson; Tamra Judge; Heather Dubrow; Shannon Storms Beador; Lizzie Rovsek
- No. of episodes: 21

Release
- Original network: Bravo
- Original release: April 14 – September 8, 2014

Season chronology
- ← Previous; Season 8 Next → Season 10

The ninth season of The Real Housewives of Orange County, an American reality television series, was broadcast on Bravo. It aired from April 14, 2014, until September 8, 2014, and was primarily filmed in Orange County, California. Its executive producers were Adam Karpel, Alex Baskin, Douglas Ross, Gregory Stewart, Scott Dunlop, Stephanie Boyriven and Andy Cohen.

The Real Housewives of Orange County focuses on the lives of Vicki Gunvalson, Tamra Judge, Heather Dubrow, Shannon Beador and Lizzie Rovsek. It consisted of 21 episodes.

This season marked the only regular appearance of Lizzie Rovsek.

== Production and crew ==
In November 2013, Lydia McLaughlin revealed there would be a ninth season after announcing her departure from the series. In March 2014, the official cast, trailer and premiere date of the season were announced. The season premiere "Hawaii 5 Uh-Oh" was aired on April 14, 2014, while the eighteenth episode "All Apologies" served as the season finale, and was aired on August 18, 2014. It was followed by a two-part reunion that aired on August 25 and September 1, 2014, and a "Secrets Revealed" episode on September 8, 2014, which marked the conclusion of the season. Adam Karpel, Alex Baskin, Douglas Ross, Gregory Stewart, Scott Dunlop, Stephanie Boyriven and Andy Cohen are recognized as the series' executive producers; it is produced and distributed by Evolution Media.

== Cast and synopsis ==
Three of the six housewives featured on the eighth season of The Real Housewives of Orange County returned for the ninth instalment. In September 2013, it was revealed that Gretchen Rossi and Alexis Bellino had not been asked to return for season 9, despite Bellino's willingness to quit prior to season 8. In November 2013, Lydia McLaughlin announced her departure from the series, saying, "I never wanted to make a career out of being a housewife. That's never really been a dream of mine", and "I want to build my brand outside of the Housewives. I've always been really honest with the producers about that. I knew that while I was filming it that I probably wasn't going to be doing it again." In 2015, McLaughlin said she would be open to returning to Bravo on her own show. Recurring cast member and former housewife Lauri Peterson also leaves the series. Joining the series in the ninth season are two new wives, Shannon Beador and Lizzie Rovsek, and recurring cast member, Danielle Gregorio. Beador is described as "quirky yet fearless," and Rovsek an "opinionated former beauty queen." Gregorio is a charitable friend to the ladies, who is brash and brutally honest. Throughout the season Gregorio finds herself in the middle of the drama among the wives.

Heather Dubrow continues pursuing her acting endeavors and lands a guest role on Hawaii Five-0. Dubrow oversees the construction of her new family home and celebrates the breaking ground with a hoedown party. Tension arises throughout the season after some of the ladies deem Dubrow as too uptight and judgmental. The drama escalates to Dubrow and Beador feuding, causing Dubrow to kick Beador out of her home. Later the drama explodes at Rovsek's parents' house when rumors of Dubrow gossiping about Beador come to light, and some are left questioning Beador's integrity and stability. Dubrow and Tamra Judge also feel a rift in their friendship, which worsens when Dubrow invites Judge onto Good Day L.A. Newlywed Judge considers having a child with Eddie as she deals with her son's health issues. To experience what having a child would be like, the Judges order a robotic baby called Astro. Judge is left in tears when her son Ryan drops a bomb regarding his girlfriend Sarah. Vicki Gunvalson's divorce to Donn finalizes and she continues to struggle to find common ground between Ayers and everyone else, especially her daughter. Gunvalson worries that Briana and her husband Ryan will likely relocate to Oklahoma. Beador experiences difficulties in balancing her career and marriage to her husband David, especially when he sends her a shocking email. Rovsek is unsure whether to pursue her career as a swimsuit designer or have a third child with her husband Christian. During the season, Rovesk has one of the worst birthdays she has ever had. Rovsek also finds herself in the middle of Dubrow and Beador's feud, as well as finding herself feuding with Judge.

== Episodes ==
The Real Housewives of Orange County season 9 episodes
No. overall	No. in season	Title	Original release date	U.S. viewers (millions)
125	1	"Hawaii 5 Uh-Oh"	April 14, 2014	1.70
Heather befriends new housewife Shannon. She later travels to Hawaii to film for Hawaii Five-O; Tamra and Vicki join her for the weekend trip, although they clash when Heather refuses to party. Meanwhile, Vicki's divorce from Donn is finalized, and Vicki has difficulty managing the tension between her boyfriend Brooks and her daughter Briana.
126	2	"Meet & Potatoes"	April 21, 2014	1.84
Vicki explains her rekindled relationship with Brooks to Heather and Tamra before they leave Hawaii. Tamra arranges a Halloween party upon their return; after meeting the housewives, Shannon invites them to her house for dinner. Meanwhile, Tamra considers having a child with her husband Eddie.
127	3	"Fakes-giving, Fake Friends"	April 28, 2014	1.71
Heather feels excluded by the housewives while Shannon's party continues. She travels for Thanksgiving, while the other housewives enjoy a "Fakes-giving" dinner.
128	4	"Pretty Ugly"	May 5, 2014	1.43
Heather and Tamra are introduced to new housewife Lizzie at a charity event, while Tamra and Eddie discuss the idea of having a child.
129	5	"I Couldn't Chair Less"	May 12, 2014	1.74
Vicki bonds with Shannon during meetings with a holistic doctor and a Feng Shui specialist. Heather begins planning a party to commemorate the groundbreaking of her mansion, while Tamra insists that her son Ryan becomes more involved with CUT Fitness. During a group dinner outing, Vicki and Lizzie develop a distaste for one another, while Heather and Shannon argue over the seating arrangement.
130	6	"Showdown at the Hoedown"	May 26, 2014	1.64
Heather hosts a hoedown for the groundbreaking of her new house, where tensions grow between Heather and Shannon. Vicki apologizes to Lizzie.
131	7	"Choke-Lahoma"	June 2, 2014	1.82
Vicki travels to Oklahoma to help her daughter Briana look for a house. Heather and Lizzie meet with their children. Shannon and Heather also meet to discuss their issues. Shannon invites Lizzie for a makeup lesson at her house, and Tamra discovers something shocking about her son.
132	8	"Not So Silent Night"	June 9, 2014	1.62
Shannon is excited to host her annual Christmas party. At the party, Lizzie reveals that Tamra has been talking about Heather behind her back. Tamra gets some news about her son's blood test results. Vicki has trouble coping with her daughter moving to Oklahoma. At the party, Heather and Tamra talk about her guest spot on Good Day L.A.. Tamra accuses Heather of lying to her about having another gym to Good Day L.A. to compete with Tamra's gym, CUT Fitness.
133	9	"Not a Good Day LA"	June 16, 2014	1.64
After a frosty appearance on Good Day L.A., Tamra and Heather go to lunch in hopes of discussing their ongoing issues. Tamra reveals to Heather the severity of Shannon's failing marriage. During a visit from her mother, Lizzie judges a beauty pageant. Brianna and Ryan reveal the gender of their new baby to an anxious but excited Vicki. Shannon unexpectedly arrives at Tamra's house, upset about her marriage.
134	10	"Skunk in the Barnyard"	June 23, 2014	1.86
Shannon receives a text from David that rumors are going around the OC about their marriage. Shannon heads to Heather’s house to find out the source of the rumors. Vicki and Brooks head to Puerto Vallarta for a much needed vacation. Tamra orders a robotic baby.
135	11	"Making Woo-Hoo-Py"	June 30, 2014	1.77
After Heather asks Shannon to leave her house, she and David go to Puerto Vallarta to join Vicki and Brooks. Lizzie tries to balance her work and her family. Heather hires a personal chef so she can spend more time with her family. Tamra tries an experiment to teach Eddie a lesson in fatherhood, but it doesn't work out. She works on her own trying to raise the robot baby.
136	12	"La-Bomb-A"	July 7, 2014	1.69
After dinner in Mexico, Shannon and David try to get their marriage back on track with the assistance of Vicki. Heather gets new puppies while Tamra and Eddie make a final decision about Astro. Meanwhile, Lizzie tries to take her business to the next level.
137	13	"Point Break"	July 14, 2014	1.72
Lizzie hosts a dinner party at her family's beach house. Vicki brings Brooks to the party in hopes for a clean slate for him and Tamra. After entertainment the beach, tensions arise once again when a big accusation is made.
138	14	"Fully Loaded"	July 21, 2014	1.68
Lizzie's dinner party has a dramatic end when things become explosive between Heather and Shannon. Vicki and Briana see a therapist to face the "Brooks issue" once and for all. Tamra is blindsided during a family dinner where Ryan and his new girlfriend, Sarah, drop a bomb that leaves Tamra in shock.
139	15	"Valentines and Birthday Whines"	July 28, 2014	1.77
Heather and Tamra plan a trip to Bali. Lizzie's birthday doesn't reach her expectations. Heather hosts a spectacular Valentine's Day dinner party with sexy games and shenanigans.
140	16	"Bali Highs & Lows"	August 4, 2014	1.97
Heather and Shannon hope for peace and relaxation, but things escalate when Shannon gets some shocking news. Vicki hears about a statement allegedly made at the Valentine's Day dinner and Lizzie reveals her true feelings about Tamra.
141	17	"Eat, Pray, Run"	August 11, 2014	2.03
Tensions escalate as Shannon and Lizzie discuss Tamra and her part in their friendship. Vicki is shocked when she hears that Tamra has been talking about Brooks. Heather begins to hope for a new outlook between her and Shannon just as everything escalates at dinner when the ladies confront Tamra about being two-faced.
142	18	"All Apologies"	August 18, 2014	2.03
Vicki hosts a Bali dinner party and leftover tensions are still running high; the ladies don't hold back. Shannon's husband David apologizes but this leads to an unexpected fight. Vicki's daughter Briana and Tamra's son Ryan move away from the OC.
143	19	"Reunion Part One"	August 25, 2014	1.91
The ladies gather to discuss the past season's events.
144	20	"Reunion Part Two"	September 1, 2014	2.03
The ladies gather to continue to discuss the past season's events.
145	21	"Secrets Revealed"	September 8, 2014	1.20
The vault is open to air unseen footage from the season and reunion.
