= Botch =

Botch, Botched or Botcher may refer to:

- Botch (professional wrestling), a slang term for missing a scripted wrestling move
- Botch (band), an American mathcore band
- Botched (film), a 2007 horror film
- Botched (TV series), an American reality TV series
  - Botched by Nature, a spin-off TV series
- Di Botcher, Welsh actress
- Botch, a character from Dumb Ways to Die
- Lionel J. Botch, a character from Help!... It's the Hair Bear Bunch!
