= Bungle =

Bungle may refer to:

- Bungle (Rainbow), a fictional children's television character
- Bungle Bungle Range, in the Purnululu National Park in northern Western Australia
- The Bungle Family, an American comic strip
- Mr. Bungle, an experimental rock/avant-garde metal band

== See also ==
- Bungles, a 1916 series of short films
- Bangle, a rigid bracelet
- Botch (disambiguation)
