= Lacey Wildd =

American reality television personality, model, and B movie actress (born 1968)

- Born: Paula Ann Simonds; April 23, 1968 (age 58); Montgomery, West Virginia
- Other names: Paula Simonds; Paula Thebert
- Citizenship: United States
- Occupations: Actress, model, psychic
- Modeling information
- Height: 5 ft 7 in (1.70 m)
- Hair color: Blonde
- Eye color: Brown

Lacey Wildd (born Paula Ann Simonds on April 23, 1968) is an American reality television personality, model, and B movie actress, who is well known for her extreme body modifications and bust proportion. Wildd rose to some prominence when she was featured on the MTV documentary series True Life.

== Surgeries ==
=== Breast augmentations ===
Wildd has spent over $250,000 on breast augmentation surgeries. Originally an A cup, she has since moved to a QQQ cup. In 2023, having recovered from the 2021 rupturing of one of her QQQ breast implants, Wildd expressed plans to increase her breast implants to TTT. To achieve her current size, Wildd has had approximately 50 surgeries. To avoid harassment, she has not released the name of the doctor that performed her QQQ implants. She had reported that she would be traveling to Brazil, a country well known for medical tourism, to complete the surgery.

To support her breast augmentations, Wildd had to have pig skin sewed inside her abdomen. She stated that "it feels like guitar strings." She has also had to have an internal bra surgery to support her breasts and make sure that her skin could support them.

To sleep, Wildd has to lie at a thirty degree angle, or she feels like she "is being suffocated." At their previous size of LLL, her breasts weighed 42 lbs together.

In 2014, Wildd's story of her breast augmentations was featured on the E! network's Botched reality series.

=== Other surgeries ===
Wildd has stated "I want to be the adult Barbie, like the extreme Barbie." She has had her buttocks enlarged, eyes made wider, nose made thinner and a myriad of other procedures. She has estimated the cost of all of her cosmetic surgeries to total over $1 million.

== Business ==
In 2016, Wildd became a professional psychic, using the name Ghostbusty. She stated, "Everything happens for a reason and I know I was supposed to have huge boobs to help the world one soul at a time.... I had near-death experiences as a child and I think that is what caused me to have these abilities. I once refused to get in a car that crashed and killed the passenger and another time I fell down a well. As long as I can remember I’ve tried to hide this side to me but my ex-boyfriend made me realise it was something to be embraced." She previously did readings from her home in Dania Beach, Florida.

In 2026, Wildd opened Wild Willow Metaphysical & Consignment in South Charleston, West Virginia. The store's spiritual products and services are supplemented by local artists and makers selling their work in-store, utilizing a consignment model. Additionally, Wildd "said the business aims to serve as a community hub with activities and workshops, and already features an apothecary space where customers can blend their own teas."

== Personal life ==
Wildd is the mother of six children. Her daughter Tori has appeared on an installment of True Life, an MTV series, titled "I Have A Hot Mom." Tori, who is opposed to the various surgeries her mother has undergone, has stated, "My life revolves around her boobs." Her son Brandon has stated, "Everything's fake, I think. I think she looked pretty before she even had the surgery."

ABC News reported that Wildd was married by age 16 and divorced with two children by age 21. After her divorce, she worked as a waitress, where she changed her hair color from brown to blonde and got her first breast augmentation surgery.

== Filmography ==
=== Film ===
Year	Title	Character
2018	Beauty and the Beholder	Lacey Wildd
2014	Blonde Squad	Jill Masters
1996	Dr. Ice	Dancer

=== Television ===
Year	Title	Episode	Notes
2023	My Strange Addiction: Still Addicted?	Tuna Smelling & Plastic Surgery & Toenails	Self
2016	Hooked on the Look	Glamour Model Lacey Wildd Becomes Clairvoyant 'Ghost-busty'	Self
2014	Botched	Girls Gone Wildd	Self
2014	My Strange Addiction	Proud to be Plastic	Self, with Justin Jedlica
2013	Double Divas	Season 1, episode 8	Self
2013	ABC News	Lacey Wildd Wants Even Bigger Boobs - But at What Price?	Self
2012	Dr. Drew		Self
2012	20/20	Going to Extremes	Self
2011	True Life	I Have a Hot Mom	Self
