= Tim Federowicz =

American baseball player (born 1987)

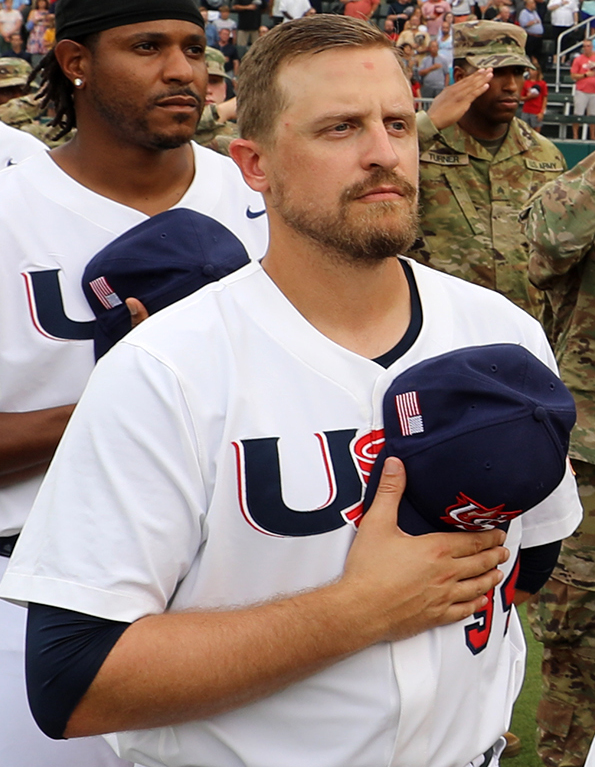
- Federowicz with the United States national baseball team in 2021
- Catcher
- Born: August 5, 1987 (age 38); Erie, Pennsylvania, U.S.
- Batted: Right Threw: Right

MLB debut
- September 11, 2011, for the Los Angeles Dodgers

Last MLB appearance
- September 25, 2019, for the Texas Rangers

MLB statistics
- Batting average: .192
- Home runs: 12
- Runs batted in: 39
- Stats at Baseball Reference

Teams
- As player: Los Angeles Dodgers (2011–2014); Chicago Cubs (2016); San Francisco Giants (2017); Houston Astros (2018); Cincinnati Reds (2018); Texas Rangers (2019); As coach: Detroit Tigers (2023)
Medals
Men's baseball
Representing United States
Olympic Games
Silver medal – second place	2020 Tokyo	Team

Timothy Joseph Federowicz (/fɛdɛˈroʊvɪtʃ/ feh-deh-ROH-vitch; born August 5, 1987) is an American former professional baseball catcher. He played in Major League Baseball (MLB) for the Los Angeles Dodgers, Chicago Cubs, San Francisco Giants, Houston Astros, Cincinnati Reds, and Texas Rangers. He currently serves as the manager for the Norfolk Tides.

== Amateur career ==
A native of Apex, North Carolina, Federowicz attended Apex High School and the University of North Carolina at Chapel Hill. At North Carolina, he was a first team Freshman All-American in 2006. After the 2007 season, he played collegiate summer baseball with the Chatham A's of the Cape Cod Baseball League. As a junior at UNC in 2008, he hit .303 in 68 games. He was selected by the Boston Red Sox in the 7th round of the 2008 Major League Baseball draft.

== Professional career ==
=== Boston Red Sox ===
He began his professional career with the Lowell Spinners in the New York–Penn League in 2008. He broke out in 2009 with the Greenville Drive, hitting .345 with 10 homers in 55 games and being named to the South Atlantic League mid-season all-star team. He was promoted to the Salem Red Sox in the Carolina League, where he played through 2010. In 2011, he began the year with the Double-A Portland Sea Dogs.

=== Los Angeles Dodgers ===
On July 31, 2011, he was traded to the Los Angeles Dodgers as part of a three-team trade that sent Érik Bédard to the Red Sox and Trayvon Robinson to the Seattle Mariners.

The Dodgers assigned him to the Triple-A Albuquerque Isotopes. He was in 25 games for the Isotopes, hitting .325 with 6 home runs.

He was called up to the Dodgers on September 6, 2011, and made his major league debut on September 11, 2011, against the San Francisco Giants as a defensive replacement in the 8th inning. He struck out in his first major league plate appearance in the ninth inning against Waldis Joaquín. On September 15, 2011, he had his first major-league start against the Pittsburgh Pirates and singled in the fifth against Ross Ohlendorf for his first major-league hit. He appeared in 7 games for the Dodgers, with 2 hits in 13 at-bats.

In 2012 with Albuquerque he hit .294 with 11 homers and 76 RBI in 115 games and was selected to the Pacific Coast League mid-season All-Star team and the post-season All-PCL Team. He returned to the Majors when the Dodgers called him up on September 1, and had one hit in four at–bats for them at the end of the season. After the season, he played for the Tigres del Licey in the Dominican Winter League.

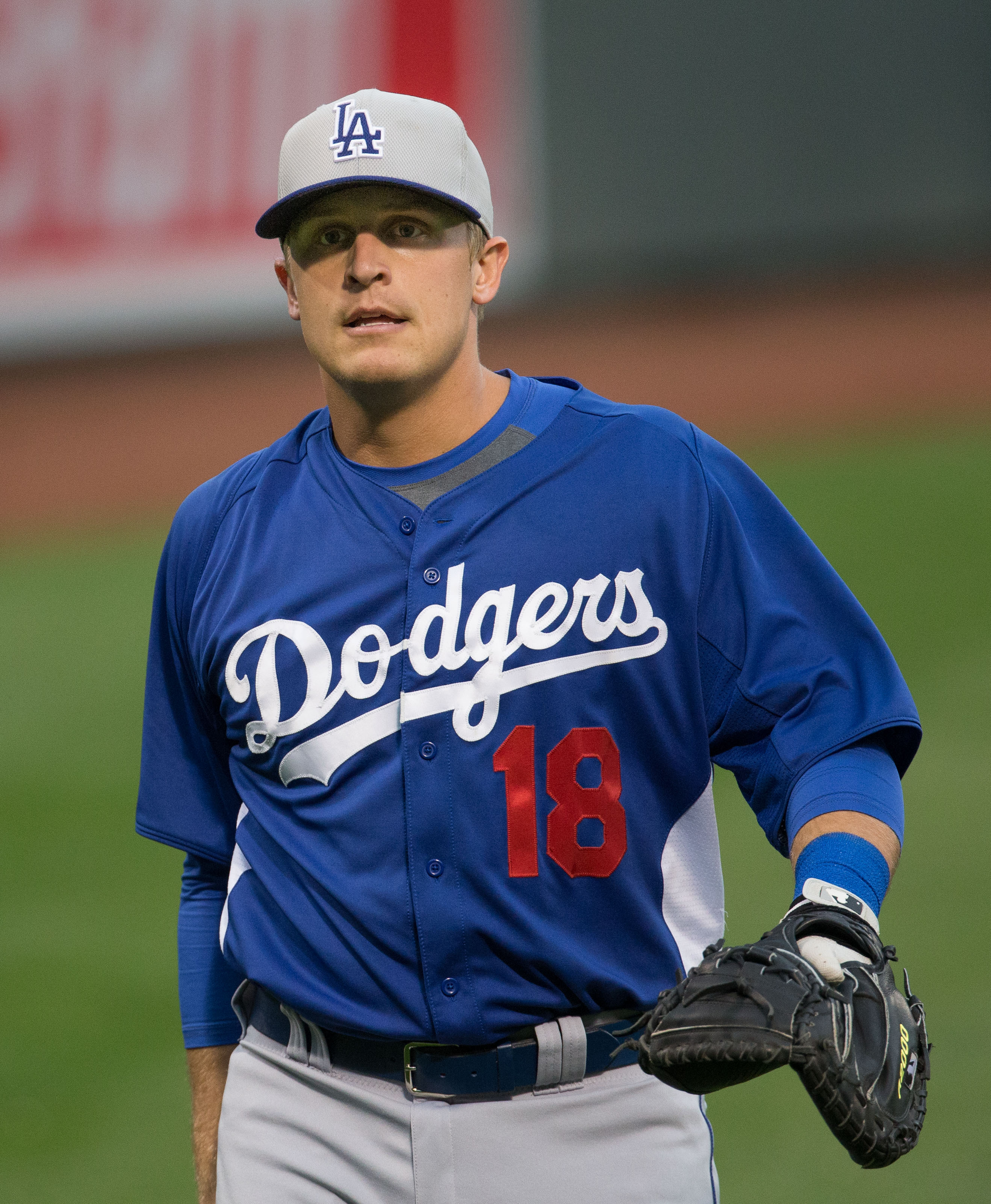
Federowicz with the Los Angeles Dodgers in 2013

Federowicz made the Dodgers opening day roster in 2013 as the backup catcher to A. J. Ellis. However, he was optioned back to Triple–A after Ramón Hernández was acquired from the Rockies. He rejoined the Dodgers in June and became the full–time backup catcher after Hernández was released on June 14.

Federowicz hit his first major league home run on June 1, 2013, at Colorado, in the top of the 3rd inning against pitcher Jhoulys Chacín. In 56 games with the Dodgers in 2013, he hit .231 with 4 homers and 16 RBI.

In 2014, he was beaten out for the backup catcher job by Drew Butera and spent most of the season in Triple–A with the Isotopes. In 78 games for them, he hit .328 with 14 home runs and 48 RBI. In limited action with the Dodgers, he hit .113 in 23 games.

=== San Diego Padres ===
On December 18, 2014, he was traded to the San Diego Padres (along with Matt Kemp and cash) in exchange for Yasmani Grandal, Joe Wieland, and Zach Eflin. During a spring training game, Federowicz suffered a tear in the lateral meniscus in his right knee, which caused him to miss the entire season. After being designated for assignment on August 1, 2015, he was sent to the Padres Triple-A El Paso Chihuahuas on August 11.

=== Chicago Cubs ===
Federowicz signed a minor league contract with the Chicago Cubs on January 14, 2016. He started the season with the Triple–A Iowa Cubs. He was brought up to the major league roster on April 28. Federowicz appeared in 17 games for the Cubs, finishing the year with a .194 batting average and three RBI. The Cubs would eventually win the World Series in seven games over the Cleveland Indians, ending their 108-year drought. Federowicz was not active during the postseason, but would still win a world championship for the first time in his career. Federowicz was removed from the 40–man roster and sent outright to Triple–A Iowa on November 7. He subsequently rejected the assignment and elected free agency the same day.

=== San Francisco Giants ===
Federowicz signed a minor league contract with the San Francisco Giants on December 11, 2016. On April 11, 2017, his contract was purchased by the Giants. Federowicz was designated for assignment on April 18. He cleared waivers and was sent outright to the Triple–A Sacramento River Cats on April 21. On September 1, the Giants selected Federowicz's contract, adding him back to their active roster. In 13 games for the Giants, he went 3–for–13 (.231) with two home runs and three RBI. On October 30, Federowicz was designated for assignment following the acquisition of Micah Johnson. He elected free agency on November 6.

=== Houston Astros ===
On December 11, 2017, Federowicz signed a minor league contract with the Houston Astros. Federowicz was designated for assignment on June 8, 2018. He cleared waivers, as no team picked him up. Federowicz was designated for assignment on July 26. He elected to be a free agent in lieu of being designated for assignment in Triple-A Fresno Grizzlies.

=== Cincinnati Reds ===
On August 3, 2018, Federowicz signed a minor league deal with the Cincinnati Reds. On October 3, he was outrighted to the minors and removed from the Reds 40 man roster. Federowicz declared free agency the same day.

=== Cleveland Indians ===
Federowicz signed a minor league contract with the Cleveland Indians on February 14, 2019. The deal included an invitation to the Indians' major league spring training camp. In 26 games for the Triple–A Columbus Clippers, Federowicz slashed .278/.353/.411 with two home runs and 13 RBI.

=== Texas Rangers ===
On June 7, 2019, Federowicz was traded to the Texas Rangers in exchange for a player to be named later or cash considerations. The Rangers selected his contract, adding him to their major league 25-man roster, on the same day. On August 1, Federowicz was designated for assignment. On August 3, Federowicz cleared waivers and was outrighted to the Nashville Sounds. On September 20, the Rangers selected his contract. He became a free agent following the 2019 season.

On December 19, 2019, Federowicz was re-signed with the Rangers on a minor league contract that included an invitation to spring training. He did not play in a game in 2020 due to the cancellation of the minor league season because of the COVID-19 pandemic. Federowicz became a free agent on November 2, 2020.

=== Los Angeles Dodgers (second stint) ===
On December 16, 2020, Federowicz signed a minor league contract with the Los Angeles Dodgers organization where he was assigned to the Triple-A Oklahoma City Dodgers. He played in only 25 games, missing time to play in the 2020 Summer Olympics and additional time on the injured list. He batted only .200 before he was released on September 4, 2021.

== Coaching career ==
=== Seattle Mariners ===
On December 7, 2021, Federowicz announced his retirement from professional baseball, and announced that he would be serving as the manager for the Tacoma Rainiers, the Triple-A affiliate of the Seattle Mariners, for the 2022 season. The Rainiers finished with a 72–78 record in his only year with the Mariners organization.

=== Detroit Tigers ===
On January 19, 2023, Federowicz was named the catching coach for the Detroit Tigers. On December 1, Federowicz was named the manager for the Toledo Mud Hens. The Mud Hens went 69–80 in his lone campaign with the ballclub.

=== Baltimore Orioles ===
On December 6, 2024, the Baltimore Orioles hired Federowicz to serve as the manager for their Triple-A affiliate, the Norfolk Tides.

== International career ==
In May 2021, Federowicz was named to the roster of the United States national baseball team for qualifying for baseball at the 2020 Summer Olympics. After the team qualified, he was named to the Olympics roster on July 2. Federowicz did not appear in the tournament, all catching being done by Mark Kolozsvary. He still received a silver medal, which the team secured after falling to Japan in the gold-medal game.
