= Botched (TV series) =

2014 American reality television series

- Genre: Reality television
- Starring: Terry Dubrow; Paul Nassif
- Country of origin: United States
- Original language: English
- No. of seasons: 8
- No. of episodes: 141

Production
- Executive producers: Alex Baskin; Douglas Ross; Greg Stewart; Mark Herwick; Terry Dubrow; Paul Nassif
- Camera setup: Multiple
- Running time: 42 minutes
- Production company: Evolution Media

Original release
- Network: E!
- Release: June 24, 2014 – March 14, 2024

Related
- Good Work; Botched by Nature

Botched is an American reality television series that premiered on cable channel E! on June 24, 2014. It follows doctors Terry Dubrow and Paul Nassif as they "remedy extreme plastic surgeries gone wrong."

== Production ==
Botched's first season, consisting of eight episodes, ended on August 17, 2014. A two-part reunion special hosted by Maria Menounos aired on October 26 and 27, and featured interviews with Dubrow, Nassif, and patients from the series.

On August 5, 2014, Botched was renewed for a second season, which premiered on April 14, 2015. On June 7, it moved from its Tuesday, 9 pm timeslot to Sunday, 9 pm. The mid-season finale aired on July 12. The series was renewed for a third season on July 1.

Three specials, titled Botched: Post Op, aired after the October 13, 20 and 27 episodes. The specials were co-hosted by Nassif, Dubrow, and Dubrow's wife, actress Heather Dubrow.

Season 3 premiered on May 10, 2016, starring both Dubrow and Nassif. It ended on August 2, 2016. In October 2015, the eight-episode spin-off series of Botched was announced entitled Botched by Nature. It premiered on August 9, 2016.

On November 12, 2020, the series was renewed for a seventh season which premiered in 2021.

On July 20, 2022, the series was renewed for an eighth season, which premiered in 2023.

On June 10, 2025, a spin-off series, entitled Botched Presents: Plastic Surgery Rewind and hosted by Dubrow, Dr. Spirit and Michelle Visage, was announced to begin airing on July 9, 2025. The spin-off series follows a group of celebrities who must consider whether to reverse their cosmetic procedures and return to a more natural look or to remain as they are.

== Episodes ==
=== Series overview ===
Season	Episodes		Originally released	
Season	Episodes		First released	Last released
1	10		June 24, 2014	October 27, 2014
2	20		April 14, 2015	November 24, 2015
3	13		May 10, 2016	August 2, 2016
4	22	12	June 24, 2017	August 17, 2017
4	22	10	May 9, 2018	July 18, 2018
5	17		December 6, 2018	March 27, 2019
6	22	10	November 5, 2019	January 20, 2020
6	22	12	April 13, 2020	September 18, 2020
7	17		May 18, 2021	March 8, 2022
8	20		August 3, 2023	March 14, 2024
Special			October 29, 2019	October 26, 2020

=== Season 1 (2014) ===
No. overall	No. in season	Title	Original release date	U.S. viewers (millions)
1	1	"Human Dolls"	June 24, 2014	0.78
A woman with a uni-boob. A woman who has had six rhinoplasties. A so-called "human doll".
2	2	"Janice Dickinson Knows Breast"	June 29, 2014	1.23
A man with a crooked nose. A patient who wants eye-opening surgery. Model Janice Dickinson needs her breast implants redone after approximately 30 years.
3	3	"Vagina Bomb!"	July 6, 2014	1.69
Featuring adult film star Kimber James.
4	4	"Making of a Belieber"	July 13, 2014	1.47
5	5	"Like a Surgeon"	July 20, 2014	1.62
A reality star looks for help from Dr. Dubrow to fix her botched breasts and stomach. Venus D-Lite, a male Madonna impersonator visits Dr. Nassif asking for his nose to be fixed.
6	6	"Boob Freak!"	July 27, 2014	1.70
The doctors have their hands full with a personal trainer willing to go to extreme measures to remove a head scar.
7	7	"Girls Gone Wildddd"	August 10, 2014	1.09
Uneven breasts; tummy tuck while awake; Lacey Wildd wants to go to size QQQ.
8	8	"Silicone Valley"	August 17, 2014	1.21
A transgender pop star needs her pixie ears fixed for a music video shoot.
9	9	"Reunion: Show & Tell (Part 1)"	October 26, 2014	0.76
10	10	"Reunion: Show & Tell (Part 2)"	October 27, 2014	0.67

=== Season 2 (2015) ===
No. overall	No. in season	Title	Original release date	U.S. viewers (millions)
11	1	"I Love New York"	April 14, 2015	1.29
Reality television personality Tiffany "New York" Pollard wants to get her deformed breasts fixed. Other cases include a severely burned chin and a woman's face filled with cement.
12	2	"Boob-Watch"	April 21, 2015	1.18
Actress Nicole Eggert wants to reduce the size of her breasts. Terry deals with a case involving flesh-eating bacteria.
13	3	"The Bacon Bra"	April 28, 2015	0.88
A female bodybuilder asks the doctors how to become more feminine. Another patient wants to look like a blow-up doll.
14	4	"Four Leeches and a Funeral"	May 5, 2015	1.03
Reality television personality Dwight Eubanks gets his nose fixed. Susan Sykes, a model known by the stage name Busty Heart, consults the doctors about her stomach.
15	5	"Mo' Steroids Mo' Problems"	May 12, 2015	0.91
Big Kaz, a former member of the rap group Mo Thugs, wants to fix his man boobs. Jordan James Parke talks to the doctors about his leaking lips.
16	6	"Dolly'D Up"	May 19, 2015	0.82
A Dolly Parton impersonator wants to get her saggy skin removed and a patient with a potentially un-fixable nose.
17	7	"House of Horrors"	June 7, 2015	1.11
Sarah Burge wants to get a facelift.
18	8	"Knuckles and Knockers"	June 14, 2015	1.43
Dr Dubrow tries to separate a uniboob. Dr Nassif fights to fix a former boxer's nose.
19	9	"The Pec Whisperer"	June 21, 2015	0.97
The Human Doll returns to help pump up a pec-less body builder.
20	10	"Attack of the 3,000cc Implants"	June 28, 2015	1.20
Former large breast model Dee Stein (Deena Duos) has her failing 3,000cc saline implants removed; Dr Nassif tackles a soldier's botched nose.
21	11	"Say Yes to the Breasts"	July 5, 2015	1.12
Dr Dubrow helps former actress Heather Elizabeth Parkhurst, who fought a flesh-eating disease that left her with no breasts.
22	12	"The Serial Filler"	July 12, 2015	0.94
Reality television personality Farrah Abraham consults the doctors about her botched lip implants.
23	13	"Double Trouble"	October 6, 2015	0.92
Twins Kristina and Karissa Shannon want to get their botched noses and breasts fixed. A woman with a severely botched nose wants to get her nose fixed, but after revealing that her nose is leaking clear fluid, Dr. Nassif orders a CT scan, which leads to a shocking discovery.
24	14	"Dr. Nassif Saved My Life"	October 13, 2015	0.98
After saving Luci's life, Dr Nassif is given the go-ahead to finally fix her nose; he also consults a woman anxious to repair a botched facelift. Dr Dubrow performs a breast lift on a very droopy patient.
25	15	"Boner Free Zone"	October 20, 2015	TBA
The doctors transform the nose of a woman who had her dentist perform her surgery.
26	16	"Breast Greedy"	October 27, 2015	TBA
Dr Dubrow works on a patient who wants to retire her Baywatch boobs, and Dr Nassif consults a woman who wants a revision after originally having a nose job at 12 years old.
27	17	"The Wizard of Schnoz"	November 3, 2015	TBA
Terry makes a breast cancer survivor feel whole again and gets a visit from his wife. Paul operates on two twin sisters noses.
28	18	"Where the Wildd Things Are"	November 10, 2015	TBA
Terry and Paul help a woman who calls herself the unluckiest person in the world and Lacey Wildd returns with a big problem.
29	19	"The Living Doll"	November 17, 2015	TBA
The doctors meet Blondie, who aspires to be a plastic doll. Dr Dubrow consults a transgender woman whose doctor decided to 'gift' her 700CC implants rather than 350CC. Dr Nassif fixes a complex botched nose job.
30	20	"Stitched Up Sisters"	November 24, 2015	TBA
Dr. Dubrow keeps it in the family when he works on a pair of co-dependent sisters; Dr. Nassif operates on a large man with a big nose; the doctors meet YouTuber and extreme waist trainer, Penny Brown.

=== Season 3 (2016) ===
No. overall	No. in season	Title	Original release date	U.S. viewers (millions)
31	1	"Foreign Bodies"	May 10, 2016	0.99
Rajee is back and the doctors try to fix her cement-filled face. Terry performs surgery on a woman whose nipples are too high, and an “out-of-this world” patient wants to look like an alien.
32	2	"Man Boobs"	May 17, 2016	1.10
Dr. Dubrow helps a mother whose frontside looks like a backside, Dr. Nassif takes on a woman who hasn't been able to close her mouth since college; a gambler who got breast implants to win a bet.
33	3	"Pinched Perfect"	May 24, 2016	0.91
Paul helps singer Norwood Young find his voice again. Terry helps a young mother whose surgeon put in two different sized implants. The doctors assist a woman with stretched out earlobes.
34	4	"Double D-Saster"	May 31, 2016	1.00
Paul helps Victoria "Porkchop" Parker who isn't comfortable walking the streets without makeup, a woman with "sideshow boobs" tries to help her marriage, and the doctors extract body modification implants.
35	5	"Super Fupa"	June 7, 2016	0.89
Terry operates on a cancer survivor whose gynecologist did her tummy tuck, Paul performs a rhinoplasty on a woman who's been teased since childhood, and a human doll seeks the doctors' help.
36	6	"Plastic Fantastic"	June 14, 2016	0.94
After almost dying during a procedure in Ecuador, an ex-playboy model wants to take a second chance at fixing her neck and nose. Dr. Dubrow who has symmastia after previously undergoing breast surgery.
37	7	"Seeing Double"	June 21, 2016	0.87
A fitness enthusiast and nasal spray addict wants Paul to fix her nose, a woman with deflated boobs comes to Terry for help, and the doctors meet the world's most identical twins.
38	8	"Totally Waist-ed"	June 28, 2016	1.10
Dr. Nassif helps a man who just wants his ears back, Dr. Dubrow hopes to fix a botched butt implant, and the doctors meet with a woman who has had 17 surgeries to look like the perfect pixie.
39	9	"Short Changed at the Nipple Bank"	July 5, 2016	1.10
A transgender woman who got her rhinoplasty in Mexico seeks Dr. Nassif's help to fix her collapsed nose, Dr. Dubrow tackles a botched double mastectomy, and a young woman travels from the UK to look faker than fake.
40	10	"I Went to Mexico and Got Terrible Rhinorrhea"	July 12, 2016	0.84
Dr. Nassif helps a mother of three out of a snotty situation, Dr. Dubrow transforms a woman whose ex-boyfriend pressured her to get extremely large implants, and a man from Kentucky wants the King of Pop's infamous nose.
41	11	"Blowfish Lips and Crab Claw Bits"	July 19, 2016	0.95
Dr Nassif helps a woman with blowfish lips, while Dr Dubrow takes on a difficult case of crab-claw breasts.
42	12	"J-Cup Juggernaut"	July 26, 2016	0.92
Dr. Nassif transforms a woman whose nose has been stuck at a '7 o'clock" angle, Dr. Dubrow helps a patient get her groove back by fixing her man-boobs, and a woman comes from across the pond for help with her J-sized breasts.
43	13	"Here Comes Tummy Boo Hoo"	August 2, 2016	0.86
In the season finale, Dr. Nassif helps a fellow Lebanese patient get the nose she wants in time for her wedding, Dr. Dubrow attempts to fix a woman's strip mall boob job, and Mama June from Honey Boo Boo fame needs a fupa lift.

=== Season 4 (2017–2018) ===
No. overall	No. in season	Title	Original release date	U.S. viewers (millions)
Part 1
44	1	"The Boob Fountain of Youth"	June 24, 2017	N/A
A drag queen seeks Dubrow's expertise to rejuvenate his breast implants (and career); The doctors meet a woman who wants to blow up her butt.
45	2	"Comic Proportions"	June 25, 2017	N/A
A cosplayer meets with the doctors to make her body more comical; Dr. Dubrow helps a woman whose previous surgery left a heart on her butt; Dr. Nassif operates on a woman who had her nose ruined over 30 years ago.
46	3	"All Twerk and No Play"	July 2, 2017	N/A
Dr. Dubrow helps a woman with boobs gone bad get her sexy back and a bodybuilder get back in the gym; the doctors offer advice to a patient Shauna Brooks on her cheeky transformation.
47	4	"To Implant or Not to Implant..."	July 9, 2017	N/A
Rodrigo Alves returns after undergoing three nasal surgeries in less than a year; Terry help a Texas chef with jarring pain from her breast implants; a dominatrix undergoes an unconventional procedure for butt projection.
48	5	"Twin Terrors"	July 16, 2017	N/A
A set of twins with not so identical problems; Dr. Dubrow tries to help the world's first paraplegic fitness model achieve her dream; Dr. Nassif performs a rhinoplasty on a woman whose nose has been altered by a cleft palate deformity.
49	6	"4000cc's and Counting"	July 23, 2017	N/A
Dr. Nassif takes on a man with three eyebrows; Dr. Dubrow operates on a mother of three who refers to her botched breasts as saggy baggies; a woman wants to potentially downsize her massive money makers.
50	7	"Lumpy Lady Lumps"	July 30, 2017	N/A
Dr. Dubrow helps a fitness fanatic fix her lady lumps; Dr. Nassif helps a house flipper close the deal on her witchy nose; a house husband with a plus-sized pout hopes to supersize it.
51	8	"Sticky Nipples and Paparazzi Nightmares"	August 3, 2017	N/A
A mother of two faces the possibility of having to duct tape her breasts and a nurse needs her nose fixed. Actress Phoebe Price also asks Dr. Nassif to fix her nose.
52	9	"Meet the Future Mrs. Paul Nassif"	August 10, 2017	N/A
A Love-Crazy Canadian uses her boobs to get to Paul, while the doctors help a former model fix her nose before her wedding and call for back-up on a revision tummy tuck.
53	10	"Make Titties Great Again"	August 17, 2017	N/A
Dr. Dubrow sees a form recluse who is hoping she can regain her confidence with new breasts. Dr. Nassif looks at a nose job that has gone wrong to see if he can fix it.
54	11	"It's Called Bimbofication"	August 24, 2017	N/A
Paul and Terry learn what bimbofication is and a woman hopes to have her 7th breast enhancement
55	12	"Boob Trains and Big Butts"	August 31, 2017	N/A
Paul and Terry help former music video vixen Tawny Kitaen get off the boob train, treat a heart-shaped nose that gives love a bad name, and meet a Brazilian doll that wants a bigger butt. Dr. Dubrow reveals his late brother was lead vocalist of the heavy metal band Quiet Riot.
Part 2
56	13	"The Real Boobs Of New Jersey"	May 9, 2018	N/A
Dr Dubrow helps a New Jersey housewife's agitated breasts, while Dr Nassif tackles a car-wrecked twin's twisted nose.
57	14	"I Like Big Butts and I Did Not Die!"	May 16, 2018	N/A
A patient with a flat nose wants it fixed so he can propose and the Doctors meet a patient that died after a makeover went wrong.
58	15	"Double Bubble and No Butt Trouble"	May 23, 2018	N/A
Dr. Nassif helps a celebrity Mariah Carey impersonator to see what they can do for her after silicone injections have left her with a dented chin, a patient who requires a new butt after cancer treatment when he was a younger. Dr. Dubrow treats a patient who needs a breast implants fixing after a previous surgery had gone wrong.
59	16	"Mother Knows Breast"	May 30, 2018	N/A
Dr. Dubrow helps a patient with a breast reconstruction after a double mastectomy and Dr. Nassif helps a patient who requires a new nose.
60	17	"Gimme Gimme More... Surgery"	June 6, 2018	N/A
A former Patient Rajee is back to see the doctors again and Dr. Nassif advises a pop star impersonator requires his nose fixing. Dr. Dubrow treats a patient with uneven breasts after previous surgery failed to remedy this.
61	18	"Junk in the Trunk"	June 13, 2018	N/A
Dr. Nassif treats a patient who needs help with her lip after a dog had attacked her. Dr. Dubrow performs surgery on a patient with spina bifida. The doctors advise a patient who after multiple breast surgeries requires her breasts fixed so that they are symmetrical.
62	19	"Silicone Slip-Ups"	June 20, 2018	N/A
Ravaged by a flesh-eating disease, a young woman needs the doctors' help to save what's left of her breasts; a Southern woman wants her 'witchy' nose gone. Drag queen Detox Icunt visits the doctors about her six pack.
63	20	"The Boobinati"	June 27, 2018	N/A
Extra-large areolae force a sugar baby with 1600cc breasts to consult with the doctors. They also help a clumsy wife finally feel deserving of her husband by tackling her tricky nose.
64	21	"Beach Ball Boobs"	July 11, 2018	N/A
A man who wants to be an elf is willing to sacrifice his vision to look extra-terrestrial, and an accident-prone woman is hoping her 15th nose job is the charm.
65	22	"Perfect Chest Quest"	July 18, 2018	N/A
Martina Big's extreme summer tan injections have led her back to see the doctor's again to continue her transformation; a transgender male seeks out the doctors to fix his botched chest masculinization.

=== Season 5 (2018–2019) ===
No. overall	No. in season	Title	Original release date	U.S. viewers (millions)
66	1	"Knockers On Heaven's Door"	December 6, 2018	N/A
Tameka Harris visits the doctors over a botched breast augmentation and Pixee Fox continues her wish to become a living cartoon. A patient consults Dr. Nassif about bags under her eyes after botched surgery.
67	2	"Shake What Your Momma Didn't Give You"	December 13, 2018	N/A
Dr. Nassif helps a patient who has a hole in their nose, and a plus sized model wants even larger breasts. Dr. Dubrow treats a patient whose previous breast surgery left her with two differently sized breasts.
68	3	"Bigger Isn't Breast"	December 20, 2018	N/A
A former reality TV star from 16 and Pregnant visits the doctors with a view to get a breast reduction; a patient seeks out help to fix her botched chin surgery; and a patient with tuberous breasts would like to move on.
69	4	"Playground Trauma And A Pint-sized Mama"	December 27, 2018	N/A
A model has travelled to see the doctors from Ireland to get bigger breasts; a patient with a broken nose has an unusual request; and a patient requires a tummy tuck after a previous operation left her with a 'Christmas tree tummy'.
70	5	"Muscles, Tucks and Forehead Flaps"	January 2, 2019	N/A
A patient who performed her own nasal cancer treatment, with disastrous results, consults Dr. Nassif. The drag queen Trinity the Tuck seeks the doctor's help to correct some botched lip fillers, and now wants them upgraded. Dr. Dubrow consults a patient whose implants have collapsed.
71	6	"Nothing Butt Trouble"	January 9, 2019	N/A
A patient consults the doctors after having industrial grade silicon injections in her backside. A lip filler 'enthusiast' from the UK seeks help with her lips and breasts. Dr Nassif operates on a patient's botched nose following multiple breaks.
72	7	"Baby Got Boobs"	January 16, 2019	N/A
A patient who had breast cancer, a double mastectomy and tummy tuck has scarring after reconstruction surgery. Dr. Nassif consults a woman who would like her nose flattened and her 'burger nipples' fixed. Dr. Dubrow consults a patient who would like her breast implants removed.
73	8	"Lumpy Lipo and Slippy Nippy"	January 23, 2019	N/A
Dr Nassif consults a patient who had facial reconstruction surgery following a car accident, but is looking for better results. A patient with Poland Syndrome consults Dr Dubrow to make her breasts more even and move her displaced nipple. A previous patient visits the doctors again for advice on a tummy tuck.
74	9	"2,000ccs and Counting..."	January 30, 2019	N/A
Dr Nassif operates on a man's nose after a dog bite and previous reconstructive surgery left it crooked. A woman from Australia who already has 2000cc breast implants would like Dr Dubrow's help to go even bigger. A patient would like her previous breast enhancement surgery fixed as the breasts are too high.
75	10	"Playing with Fire"	February 6, 2019	N/A
A young woman has different sizes breasts after a previous breast operation. Sallie Axl a British DJ would like her nose straightened. Dr. Nassif treats a patient who was given a nose job (which she hadn't asked for) whilst undergoing liposuction.
76	11	"Magical Mystery Breasts"	February 13, 2019	N/A
A patient with Sarcoidosis needs both doctors' expertise, as she hopes to have her breasts fixed and her face filled out due to fat loss in her cheeks. A woman asks Dr. Dubrow to fix the asymmetry in her breasts. A patient hopes for dream abs he can't get in the gym.
77	12	"Breast Lumps and Empty Noses"	February 20, 2019	N/A
Dr Nassif pulls out all the stops to help a woman headbutted by a bulldog and who is now missing the inside of her nose; Dr Dubrow must remove a breast lump to stop a leaking nipple.
78	13	"Butchered Breasts and Nasal Nightmares"	February 27, 2019	N/A
Model Carmen Campuzano would like Dr. Nassifs help to restore her damaged nose after an accident with a suitcase and a further motoring accident. A patient with uneven sized breasts seeks help from Dr. Dubrow and a patient who has had multiple nose operations after domestic abuse seeks help.
79	14	"Welcome to Jurassic Schnoz"	March 6, 2019	N/A
Dr. Dubrow helps a patient with an eating disorder and also a patient who has had previous breast surgery where the implants had been put in incorrectly Dr. Nassif operates on a patient who is unhappy with her nose
80	15	"Viva Las Vegas Boobs"	March 13, 2019	N/A
A patient visits the Doctors requiring revision surgery on her stomach, a patient consults Dr. Nassif after having rhinoplasty surgery when she was 12 and a patient requires breast surgery to fix her drooping breasts.
81	16	"A Revision Runs Through It"	March 20, 2019	N/A
The Doctors take some downtime and go Fly fishing whilst on the trip the Doctors consult a patient whose nose was damaged in a motorcycle accident. Dr. Dubrow helps a patient who has a botched tummy tuck operation and breast surgery.
82	17	"Cougars and Cobras and Boobs... Oh My!"	March 27, 2019	N/A
Dr. Dubrow treats a patient who wanted a Breast reduction and ended up with an enlargement. Dr. Nassif helps a patient who requires a neck lift and Dr. Dubrow removes a worrying mole from Dr. Nassif's face.

=== Season 6 (2019–2020) ===
No. overall	No. in season	Title	Original release date	U.S. viewers (millions)
83	1	"I Love New Boobs"	November 4, 2019	0.49
Tiffany Pollard is back to beat Breast Implant Illness and go au naturel; a former patient with over-injected lips returns, hoping to restore them to normal.
84	2	"Not OK From the UK"	November 11, 2019	0.61
A UK patient with a duck butt and bulging belly has Dr Dubrow to perform a two-stage revision to restore her 24-year-old body.
85	3	"Bums, Boobs and Baklava"	November 18, 2019	0.56
A British bum ambassador is packing on the pounds to get a Kim K-inspired butt; Dr Dubrow helps a mother of nine battle one of the worst cases of capsular contracture he's ever seen.
86	4	"Big Booty Problems"	November 25, 2019	0.59
Dr Dubrow lifts a woman's spirit and her 'udderly' disastrous sagging breasts; Dr Nassif does a rhinoplasty on a woman who has beef with her 'pig nose'.
87	5	"Flipped Out Butt & A Pelican Neck"	December 2, 2019	0.67
Dr Dubrow helps a patient who is flippin' out over her flippin' butt implants; Dr Nassif tries to safe a patient with a wrecked pelican neck.
88	6	"Boob Greed & Bump Its"	December 9, 2019	0.57
A woman with four implants in her chest seeks Dr Dubrow's help to remove them; a transgender patient from Australia wants to add two implants on top of her head to replace her 'bump it'. Dr Nassif tackles a challenging rhinoplasty revision.
89	7	"All I Want for Christmas..."	December 16, 2019	0.52
A mum who claims Santa broke her nose seeks Dr Nassif's help; a woman with cobwebbed areolae is haunted by the ghosts of surgeries past.
90	8	"Face Misfor-Chin"	January 6, 2020	0.69
A facial skin graft growing pubic hair challenges Dr Nassif, while Dr Dubrow treats a boob winking patient who's back for surgery. They also consult with a disco-jacket wearing fashion designer who wants to revise a chin implant.
91	9	"Zombie Breasts"	January 13, 2020	0.71
Dr Nassif kicks the butt of a patient's nose, while Dr Dubrow helps a single mother whose breast implant fell out while brushing her teeth.
92	10	"Bunny Boobs & Pooch Patrol"	January 20, 2020	0.67
The boss of Northern Kentucky wants to downsize her breasts after spending $1 million to look like a doll.
Part 2
93	11	"Reality Star Vixens And Their Afflictions"	April 13, 2020	0.61
Dr Nassif has a 'ruff' case ahead of him when a dog bite victim needs some TLC; Dr Dubrow has his hands full with an OG reality star's Real World uni-boob situation.
94	12	"Jaw Dropping Booberati"	April 20, 2020	0.69
Two big-bosomed buddies pay a visit to the doctors, while a Dubrow patient desperately needs help fixing her elephant trunk-looking breast.
95	13	"Flaws, Jaws, And Extra Bras"	April 27, 2020	0.58
Dr Dubrow helps give a three-boobed woman the perfect pair; Dr Nassif works to correct a car accident victim's mangled nose; a 27-year old LA socialite with jacked-up jowls wants a facelift.
96	14	"Boobs Dance And A Second Chance"	May 11, 2020	0.53
While Dr Nassif steps into the surgical ring to help a boxer's crushed nose; Dr Dubrow needs his A game to bring a young woman's dead breasts back to life.
97	15	"MIA Mound and a DUI Disaster"	May 18, 2020	0.58
A Black Hawk crew chief with one MIA breast needs Dr Dubrow's help; Dr Nassif attempts to bring back the smile of a DUI accident victim.
98	16	"Cross-Eyed Nips and Cartel Hips"	June 1, 2020	0.56
A Cartel Crew bombshell who can't keep fat in her booty seeks advice from Dr Dubrow; a patient who had plastic surgery from a dentist hopes for a breast revision redemption.
99	17	"Send Me A Mir-ear-acle"	August 3, 2020	0.47
A breast-obsessed Brazilian wants her 33rd breast surgery; a Dutch performer wants her butt camera ready; a man with a cauliflower-looking keloid on his ear hopes Dr Nassif can remove it.
100	18	"Hopeful Transformations"	August 10, 2020	0.60
A Scarlett Johansson look-alike wants the doctors to give her a flawless, twerkable booty; Dr Dubrow helps a mum with creaseless breasts get the reduction she's tried to achieve for 20 years.
101	19	"Necrotic Nightmare"	August 17, 2020	0.47
A filler-obsessed Australian wants Dr Dubrow to increase her breast size. Meanwhile, Dr Nassif tries to bring a nose back to life after a horrible necrosis incident.
102	20	"Would You Like Pepperoni on Those Boobs?"	August 24, 2020	0.45
A patient with bologna-sized areolae wants to turn them into pepperonis; Dr Nassif uses a ground-breaking technique to rebuild a patient's nose after her tip blackened and died.
103	21	"Melting Mounds & Unlucky Charms"	August 31, 2020	0.52
A Southern belle who wants to look like Dolly Parton hopes to change the shape of her breasts; a woman from Northern Ireland thinks her nose makes her look like a freak.
104	22	"Witchy Whips & Super High Nips"	September 18, 2020	N/A
An evil witch wants sexy cat eyes; a surgery in Tijuana left a woman with stomach scars and nipples by her collarbone; a young man hopes to straighten out more than just his nose.

=== Season 7 (2021–2022) ===
No. overall	No. in season	Title	Original release date	U.S. viewers (millions)
105	1	"Two Weddings & A Divorce Attorney"	May 18, 2021	N/A
Two former brides who weren't able to have the wedding of their dreams come to see Dr Nassif and Dr Dubrow.
106	2	"Shark Side Story"	May 25, 2021	N/A
A tragic accident left a man with a shark-bite-sized hole on his hip; a woman diagnosed with Lupus would love to have no more nose issues.
107	3	"I Got Dumped Because Of My Plastic Surgery"	June 1, 2021	N/A
A man with superhero arms made of silicone got dumped because of his plastic surgery obsession; an avid hider hopes to fix her mountainous nose and her dating life.
108	4	"The One Percent"	June 8, 2021	N/A
A female firefighter with 15 failed breast surgeries turns to Dr Dubrow for help; Dr Nassif investigates a nasal anomaly in a man who believes his nose was deformed in utero by his mother's IUD.
109	5	"Plastic But Not Fantastic"	June 15, 2021	0.47
The doctors perform two radical surgeries, one on a woman with bouncing basketball-sized butt implants, and the other on a patient with a smashed nose who's been turned down by over 20 doctors.
110	6	"I Should Have Done My Homework"	June 22, 2021	0.40
A man wants his nipples and belly button removed and more pronounced scarification. Two patients who didn't research their surgeons are suffering severe consequences.
111	7	"Surgical Secrets Revealed"	June 29, 2021	0.40
Patients hid their surgery from their loved ones: a woman has solid implants riding up on her hips, another has a crooked nose, and an anime addict wants to look like a cartoon character.
112	8	"Massive Medical Mystery"	July 6, 2021	0.48
A former pro-surfer has two huge masses on his abdomen. A perfectionist won't settle for anything less than her ideal nose. A bodybuilder must fix her rippling 1200cc implants.
113	9	"Big Booty Stress and a Mastectomy Mess"	July 13, 2021	0.45
A high-risk cancer patient fears her original surgeon didn't remove all her breast tissue; an accident left a young woman's chin scarred.
114	10	"Implant-Nation"	July 20, 2021	0.43
A woman suffering from pain and numbness duct tapes her calf implants daily. A young lady has a birthmark that's a pain in her neck. A young man has a bicep implant that wants to flip.
115	11	"Go With the Toe"	January 25, 2022	N/A
A cancer survivor who lost her upper lip after a procedure; a college scholar hopes to remove a gruesome graft from her foot.
116	12	"Oops, I Need Surgery Again"	February 1, 2022	0.56
A woman hopes Dr. Nassif can give her the Tiffany Pollard profile she's always dreamed of; a singer obsessed with Brittany Spears seeks bigger boobs; and a young mom who nearly lost her entire leg in a rope swing accident gets her knee fixed.
117	13	"Naked and Afraid of Surgery"	February 8, 2022	N/A
A nudist who swings on and off the golf course seeks the doctors' advice for her overly liposuctioned stomach; a mother left with janky boobs faces her fears of anesthesia; and an African woman hopes to achieve her American Dream after a flesh-eating bacteria ate her nose.
118	14	"Musical Nightmares"	February 15, 2022	N/A
A rock-n-roller with a droopy eye; a 21-year-old ravaged by a predatory doctor looks for a second chance at a mommy makeover; and a transgender woman inspires a doctor dance party.
119	15	"I Dream of Implants"	February 22, 2022	N/A
"The Human Ken Doll", aka Justin Jedlica, updates the doctors on his eight new leg implants; a woman who always aspired to be a telenovela actress needs a miracle after destroying her nose.
120	16	"The Comeback Patients"	March 1, 2022	N/A
A doctor was duped into getting silicone injections in her face; a woman who almost died from her tummy tuck seeks to erase the scars from her past.
121	17	"Seven Year Stitch"	March 8, 2022	N/A
A social experiment that follows a couple on the brink of divorce. With the guidance of Dr. Terry and Heather Dubrow and other experts, they separate for seven weeks and undergo a physical and mental makeover before determining if they will remain together.

=== Season 8 (2023–2024) ===
No. overall	No. in season	Title	Original release date	U.S. viewers (millions)
122	1	"Wheel of Misfortune"	August 3, 2023	N/A
A widow who almost died three times while healing from her tummy tuck seeks Dr. Dubrow's skill; a woman bullied because of her "pig nose" hopes Dr. Nassif can help.
123	2	"Dog Days Are Over"	August 10, 2023	0.33
A single mother is desperate for Dr. Nassif's help after a dog bite took the tip of her nose; a woman with a "butt foot" hopes Dr. Dubrow can help.
124	3	"Hot Lava Booty"	August 17, 2023	0.32
A woman who sought a more voluptuous booty is left with scars and a missing butt cheek; Dr. Nassif tackles a nose that moves back and forth.
125	4	"A Scar is Born"	August 24, 2023	0.24
A woman who was born with her intestines on the outside of her body now has a stomach full of scars; a celebrity impersonator who's spent more than $1 million in plastic surgery hopes to remove baby oil from inside her breasts.
126	5	"Mishaps in Mexico"	August 31, 2023	0.40
Dr. Dubrow helps a wife who feels betrayed after a disastrous mommy makeover in Mexico; Dr. Nassif attempts to repair horrible scarring on a woman's neck.
127	6	"Swine Flu Over the Cuckoo's Nest"	September 7, 2023	N/A
The self-proclaimed "Lips of Los Angeles" wants to be pumped, plumped, and frozen; a woman needs Dr. Nassif to fix her nose after it was eaten away by an autoimmune disease; a young woman wants Dr. Dubrow to enhance her brick-shaped breasts
128	7	"London's Nose Is Falling Down"	September 14, 2023	N/A
A woman whose nose collapsed after years of cocaine abuse seeks Dr. Nassif's help; a man hopes Dr. Dubrow will fix his soup bowl-looking chest; and an influencer is eager to become her online persona and get the biggest boobs in the world.
129	8	"Sep-EAR-ation Anxiety"	September 21, 2023	N/A
A woman's recurring keloid; and a domestic abuse survivor needs Dr Dubrow's help with capsular contracture of her breast implants.
130	9	"Baby Got Front Butt"	September 28, 2023	N/A
A woman is left with a front butt on her stomach after a mommy makeover; a familiar face returns with a collapsed nose; and an influencer who loves plastic surgery, but hates scars.
131	10	"Doctor Nose Best"	October 5, 2023	N/A
Left feeling like something out of a horror movie, a woman has a huge hole in her nose from cancer and hides it with a prosthetic; Dr. Nassif must undergo skin cancer treatments of his own.
132	11	"Eye of the Tiger"	January 18, 2024	N/A
A resilient 21-year-old who risks losing an eye after enduring a staggering 42 botched surgery attempts to repair her face after a car accident; a woman who opted for a breast augmentation after a significant weight loss journey left with mismatched breasts and an areola in an unexpected place.
133	12	"Got MILF?"	January 25, 2024	N/A
A woman who wants to continue her plastic surgery journey to follow the 'Calabasas MILF' aesthetic despite having a serious heart condition; a college student hopes to fix her bulbous nose.
134	13	"Big Booty Queen"	February 1, 2024	N/A
135	14	"Lip Filler Killer"	February 8, 2024	N/A
136	15	"Hear Me Out"	February 15, 2024	N/A
137	16	"Med Spa Drama"	February 22, 2024	N/A
138	17	"You're So Vein"	February 29, 2024	N/A
139	18	"Lip Loss"	March 7, 2024	N/A
140	19	"Donut Give Up"	March 14, 2024	N/A
141	20	"Tumor Tragedy"	March 14, 2024	N/A

== Specials ==
Title	Original release date
"Presents: Perfect"	May 26, 2015
A 1-hour special following three people looking for perfection. Justin Jedlica rebuilds his body to become the perfect superhero; a woman tries to become the perfect living caricature; a woman changes herself into the perfect celebrity.
"Most Outrageous Patients"	September 21, 2016
A countdown of the most outrageous patients (including Janice Dickinson).
"Most Outrageous Rejects"	December 1, 2016
A countdown of the most outrageous requests the doctors refused.
"Most Outrageous Celebrity Patients"	December 8, 2016
A countdown of the most outrageous celebrity patients (including Janice Dickinson again).
"Most Outrageous Before & Afters"	December 15, 2016
A countdown of the most outrageous transformations.
"Most Outrageous OMG Patients Countdown"	October 28, 2019
A countdown of the most outrageous patients - including a Britney Spears wannabe, a contestant from "Ru Paul's Drag Race," and a space elf.
"Jingle Bell Botched: Most Outrageous Patients Holiday"	December 1, 2019
A holiday countdown of some of the most outrageous patients seen by Dr. Dubrow and Dr. Nassif - including a human cartoon, viral butt implants, and a couple looking for more surgeries.
"Top 10 Most Outrageous Before & Afters"	January 27, 2020
A countdown of the top 10 most outrageous transformations - including a tummy tuck gone wrong, and a patient with Sarcoidosis.
"Most Outrageous Before & Afters Countdown"	June 8, 2020
A countdown of the most outrageous transformations.
"Most Shocking Patients"	July 6, 2020
Dr. Dubrow and Dr. Nassif look back at some of the patients who left them at a loss for words - including a woman with pubic hair growing out of her cheek.
"Most Memorable Celebrity Patients"	July 13, 2020
A countdown of the most memorable celebrity patients.
"International Disasters"	July 20, 2020
Dr. Nassif and Dr. Dubrow look back at patients who have traveled abroad only to end up with a surgical nightmare.
"Obsessed"	September 21, 2020
Dr. Nassif and Dr. Dubrow look back at their most self-obsessed patients who are never satisfied.
"Botched: Where Are They Now?"	September 28, 2020
Dr. Nassif and Dr. Dubrow check in with some of their favorite patients.
"Toughest Cases"	October 5, 2020
Dr. Dubrow and Dr. Nassif look back at their most challenging reconstructive cases.
"I Want My Life Back"	October 12, 2020
A countdown of the top 12 patients whose lives changed after their botched surgeries, including a patient whose modeling career ended after she had fat injected under her eyes.
"Botched: Salute to Service"	October 26, 2020
Dr. Nassif and Dr. Dubrow salute service members who have fallen victim to surgical disasters - including a Black Hawk crew chief missing a breast and a Navy wife who nearly lost her entire nose.
