= Paul Nassif =

American plastic surgeon and television personality

- Born: Paul Sabin Nassif; June 6, 1962 (age 64); Los Angeles, California, U.S.
- Education: University of Southern California (BS, MD)
- Occupations: Facial plastic surgeon; television personality
- Spouse: Adrienne Maloof (m. 2002; div. 2012) Brittany Pattakos (m. 2019)
- Children: 5
- Website: drpaulnassif.com

Paul Sabin Nassif (born June 6, 1962) is an American otolaryngologist (ENT) and facial plastic surgeon, and a television personality. Nassif is a member of the American Academy of Facial Plastic and Reconstructive Surgery.

Nassif is best known for co-hosting the E! reality series Botched with Terry Dubrow. The plastic surgery-themed show premiered on June 24, 2014, and has aired for eight seasons (as of 2024), and its spin-off series Botched by Nature, starring both Dubrow and Nassif, aired in 2016. He has also appeared on E!'s Dr. 90210, and the first three seasons of The Real Housewives of Beverly Hills, on which his ex-wife Adrienne Maloof was a main cast member.

== Education ==
Nassif went to Loyola High School in Los Angeles, California, and the University of Southern California, graduating with a B.S. in business in 1984. He attended Rosalind Franklin University of Medicine and Science/Chicago Medical School in his first two years of medical education, and University of Southern California School of Medicine for the latter two years, graduating in 1992. He completed a general surgery internship at the University of New Mexico Health Sciences Center, followed by an otolaryngology-head and neck surgery (ENT) residency at the University of New Mexico from 1993 to 1997. He subsequently completed a facial plastic and reconstructive surgery fellowship at St. Louis University School of Medicine in 1998.

== Personal life ==
Nassif is of Lebanese descent. On May 2, 2002, Nassif married Adrienne Maloof, a businesswoman and member of the Maloof family. The couple had three sons together: Gavin, Colin and Christian. They resided in Beverly Hills, California. Nassif filed for separation from Adrienne on July 30, 2012. Nassif's lawyer, Lisa Meyer, argued that Maloof displayed repetitive bouts of verbal and physical abuse towards him in the presence of their children. They were divorced on November 8, 2012.

On June 1, 2019, Nassif became engaged to Brittany Pattakos. On Saturday, September 28, 2019, the couple married in Santorini. Nassif and Pattakos have two children together. Their daughter, Paulina Anne, was born on October 12, 2020. Their son, Paul Michael Nassif Jr., was born on January 9, 2025.
