= Apex High School =

Public school in North Carolina, United States

Coordinates: 35°44′42″N 78°50′16″W

Location
- 1501 Laura Duncan Rd. Apex, North Carolina 27502; United States

Information
- Type: Public
- Established: 1920 (106 years ago)
- CEEB code: 340085
- Principal: Christopher Lineberry
- Teaching staff: 126.69 (FTE)
- Grades: 9–12
- Enrollment: 2,434 (2023–2024)
- Student to teacher ratio: 19.21
- Colors: Black, Green, and Gold
- Athletics: NCHSAA 8A
- Athletics conference: Quad City Seven 8A
- Team name: Cougars
- Newspaper: Peak Student Media
- Feeder schools: Apex Middle School; Salem Middle School; Lufkin Road Middle School; Holly Ridge Middle School
- Website: Apex High School

Apex High School is a public high school in Apex, North Carolina, United States, and is part of the Wake County Public School System (WCPSS). It is on a 4x4 block scheduling system.

== History ==
The 1976 Apex High School building was originally built to consolidate the segregated high schools of Apex. At the time, the all-black Apex Consolidated School's colors were blue and gold. The all-white Apex High School's colors were black and gold. The new school's colors would be green and gold. Green being the unifying color of the new integrated high school.

Apex High School was selected by WCPSS to receive a major renovation. During the evaluation and planning phases, it was determined that it would be more cost effective and provide better facilities for the students of the existing buildings were removed and a new facility constructed. Groundbreaking for the new Apex High School facility was held on June 2, 2017. The facility will be a large expansion of the square footage of the existing buildings and eliminated the need for "Pods" and "Trailers" used as expansion classrooms. The 1976 Apex High School building was vacated by staff on June 14, 2017. The administrative staff and student services were temporarily located at Apex Middle School until the Green Level facility was ready for occupancy. Once the "swing space" (the Green Level HS facility located at 7600 Roberts Rd in Cary) was ready for occupancy and all materials from the Laura Duncan Road facility were moved into the building, all staff was moved to the temporary facility, which was temporarily named as Apex High School until AHS moved back to Laura Duncan Road. The move back to Laura Duncan Road in Apex was planned for the summer of 2019 at which time all AHS staff moved back and the temporary facility opened as Green Level High School, a new Wake County Public High School.

The North Carolina State Senate passed House Bill 55 so that Apex, North Carolina police would have jurisdiction at Green Level High so they could have Apex High students in their jurisdiction.

In August 2019, classes were held at the renovated Apex location. On August 12, 2019, A. Elaine Hofmann began her term as principal.

Hofmann retired in 2026 after leading the school since 2019. Christopher Lineberry, who had previously served as principal of Casa Grande Union High School in Arizona, became principal of Apex High School on July 1, 2026.

== Academics ==
In 2012, the school posted the seventh highest average SAT score in the Raleigh Durham area: 1658 with 85.7% of students taking the test.

== Departments ==
=== Athletics ===
Apex High School is a member of the North Carolina High School Athletic Association (NCHSAA) and are classified as a 8A school. The school is a part of the Quad City Seven 8A Conference.

The school fields varsity teams for the following sports: men's/women's basketball, football, men's baseball, women's softball, women's volleyball, men's/women's soccer, men's/women's lacrosse, men's/women's tennis, cross country, track & field, gymnastics, wrestling, cheerleading, men's/women's swimming.

Apex High School is the home of the 2015 and 2013 NCHSAA 4A men's lacrosse state champions, 2000 4A baseball state champions, 2006 4A men's soccer state champions, 2007 4A women's soccer state champions, 2010 4A volleyball state champions, the 2011 4A women's swimming state champions, the 2007, 2008, 2009, and 2011 women's lacrosse state champions, and the 2014 NCHSAA 4A men's basketball state champions.

=== Clubs and activities ===
Apex High School offers a variety of different clubs and activities for students.

The Ultimate Frisbee team earned the unofficial title of 2010 Tri-9 Conference Champions in its first year of existence by defeating Holly Springs High School in a home-and-home series, 15–11 and 15–13. In 2011, they achieved 4th place in the North Carolina high school state tournament.

The Apex football team made the playoffs in 2014 for the first time since 2008.

=== Foreign languages ===
Apex High School offers French, German, and Spanish; as well as Latin as a part of their dual-enrollment program with Wake Tech Community College.

=== Performing arts ===
Apex High School also features a Concert and Marching Band. The band currently has three band classes: Concert Band I, Concert Band II, and Concert Band IV (Wind Ensemble). Marching Band is currently an extracurricular activity.

Apex High School Orchestra players have participated in the NC Eastern Regional Orchestra, NC Honors Orchestra and the Raleigh Sinfonietta.

The Apex High School Chorus is made up of 140-180 voices, male and female. The ages of students range from fourteen to eighteen. Apex students have participated in the North Carolina Honors Chorus, and the North Carolina All State Chorus. Apex High School maintains three different choir classes—Choral Ensemble, Concert Chorus (Men's Chorus), and Special Choral Ensemble Honors (Honors Women's Chorus).

=== Technology ===
Apex High School features an AOIT (Academy of Information Technology) program. AOIT works to integrate the use of technology into the standard high school curriculum. Through the AOIT program Apex High School is also able to offer technical courses covering topics such as the use of desktop applications and introductory programming. The applications courses range from Applications I, covering the use of applications such as Microsoft Office, up to E-Commerce I, which covers static web development including XHTML and basic JavaScript and a new capstone course for Seniors: Digital Video and Media. Programming courses offered cover four different programming languages starting with Python (Python Programming) followed by C# (Computer Programming II), SAS (SAS Programming I), and Java (AP Computer Science).

== Notable alumni ==
- Wes Durham, sportscaster
- Tim Federowicz, MLB catcher
- Kendall Fletcher, professional women's soccer player
- Kevin Fogg, Canadian Football League defensive back and punt returner
- Seth Frankoff, MLB pitcher
- Justin Jedlica, famous for being known as the Human Ken Doll
- Matt Mangini, MLB player
- Sio Moore, NFL linebacker
- Landon Powell, college baseball coach and former MLB catcher
- Ainsley Seiger, actress
