= It's a Fat World =

Mundo Gordo
- Theatrical release poster
- Directed by: Sandro Ventura
- Screenplay by: Italo Carrera; Daniel San Román
- Based on: Mundo Gordo
- Produced by: Adolfo Aguilar; Israel Carmen; Daniel San Román; Macarena Ventura; Sandro Ventura
- Starring: Micky Vargas; Daniela Feijoó; Renzo Schuller; Jesús Alzamora
- Cinematography: Luis Guillermo Helfer; John Mayta
- Edited by: Chemo Loli; Sandro Ventura
- Music by: Santiago León Falcón
- Production company: Big Bang Films
- Release date: September 1, 2022 (Peru)
- Running time: 105 minutes
- Country: Peru
- Language: Spanish

It's a Fat World (Spanish: Mundo Gordo, lit. 'Fat World') is a 2022 Peruvian romantic comedy film directed by Sandro Ventura from a screenplay written by Italo Carrera and Daniel San Román. It is based on the stand-up comedy of the same name released in 2019 and early 2020. It stars Micky Vargas, Daniela Feijoó, Renzo Schuller and Jesús Alzamora.

== Synopsis ==
The unfunny micro-businessman and comedian Antonio (Miguel Vargas) is in love with his childhood friend Cynthia (Daniela Feijoo), but his overweight, for which he has been called "fat" all his life, prevents him from declaring himself. When he discovers that she longs for her boss Genaro (Jesús Alzamora), he will execute a plan to win her over.

== Cast ==
- Miguel Vargas as Antonio
- Daniela Feijoó as Cynthia
- Jesús Alzamora as Gerardo
- Renzo Schuller as Gabriel
- Camucha Negrete as Adriana
- Regina Alcóver as Miryam
- Sandra Vergara as Claudia
- Ximena Hoyos as Katherina

== Production ==
Filming began in early March 2020, but filming was interrupted by the COVID-19 pandemic. In December 2020, the filming resumed using all COVID-19 measures.

== Release ==
It's a Fat World premiered on 1 September 2022 in Peruvian theaters It premiered on 19 September 2022 in Austin, Texas as part of the Austin-Lima Sister Cities event.

== Reception ==
The film brought more than 56,000 spectators to the cinema in its first week of release.

== Awards ==
Year	Award	Category	Recipient	Result	Ref.
2022	Sittavannavasal International Film Festival	Best International Feature Film	It's a Fat World	Won	
2022	Sittavannavasal International Film Festival	Best Director	Sandro Ventura	Won	
2022	Sittavannavasal International Film Festival	Best Actor	Miki Vargas	Won	
2022	Sittavannavasal International Film Festival	Best Actress	Daniela Feijoó	Won	
2022	Pulcinella Film Festival	Best Film	It's a Fat World	Nominated	
2023	Italian Comedy Film Festival	Best Film	It's a Fat World	Semifinalist	
2023	Love Film Festival	Best Feature Romantic	It's a Fat World	Won	
2023	Love Film Festival	Best Actor	Miki Vargas	Nominated	
