= Botched by Nature =

- Genre: Reality television
- Starring: Terry Dubrow; Paul Nassif
- Country of origin: United States
- Original language: English
- No. of seasons: 1
- No. of episodes: 8

Production
- Executive producers: Douglas Ross; Alex Baskin; Greg Stewart; Matt Westmore; Terry Dubrow; Paul Nassif
- Camera setup: Multiple
- Running time: 42 minutes
- Production company: Evolution Media

Original release
- Network: E!
- Release: August 3 – September 28, 2016

Related
- Botched

Botched by Nature is an American reality television spin-off series based on the plastic surgery-related series Botched that premiered on the E! cable network on August 9, 2016. Announced in October 2015, the eight-part series features Botched doctors Terry Dubrow and Paul Nassif who travel around the country and try to help people that were "botched by genetics or a traumatic incident".

== Episodes ==
No.	Title	Original release date
1	"Double Down on Ds!"	August 3, 2016
The doctors take a gamble in Sin City, helping a young woman whose autoimmune disease may have triggered her deformed breasts.
2	"This Little Piggy Went to Surgery"	August 10, 2016
The doctors help a war veteran that was struck by lightning, leaving her breasts and body disfigured.
3	"Double Trouble & A Chest Bubble"	August 17, 2016
The doctors travel to Iowa to see a young father whose infected chest implant is threatening his life.
4	"Crooked and Cracked"	August 24, 2016
The doctors to go California to meet with a woman who was born with a conjoined twin at the butt.
5	"The Chronicles of Hernia"	September 7, 2016
Enlisting an ex-CIA disguise specialist, the doctors aid a musician born without an ear.
6	"Boobs and Tubes"	September 14, 2016
The doctors help a young mother born with pectus excavatum and increasing underlying breast issues.
7	"Collapsed In & Busted Out"	September 21, 2016
Doctors Dubrow and Nassif head to Arizona to help a woman whose nose collapsed into her own face.
8	"Lip Service"	September 28, 2016
The doctors help a mother with tubular breast deformation whose breasts couldn't develop normal tissue.

== Broadcast ==
Internationally, the series started airing in Australia and New Zealand on the local version of E! on August 11, 2016.
