= Justin Jedlica =

American businessman known for extensive cosmetic surgery

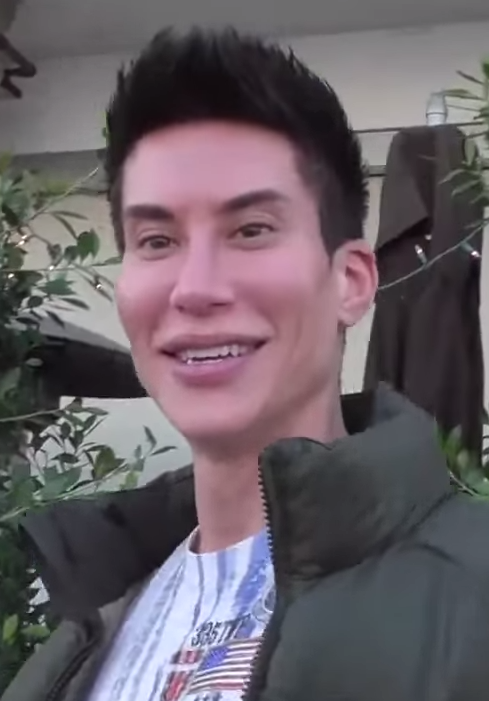
- Jedlica in 2016
- Born: August 11, 1980 (age 46); Poughkeepsie, New York, U.S.
- Education: Apex High School
- Occupation: Consulting business owner

Justin Jedlica (born August 11, 1980), also known as the "Human Ken", is an American man who has garnered international attention for undergoing many cosmetic procedures. He spent over 1 million dollars on surgery.

== Cosmetic procedures ==
At the age of seventeen, Jedlica began to research his first cosmetic procedure, rhinoplasty. Inspired by watching Lifestyles of the Rich and Famous as a teen, Jedlica saw body contouring and cosmetic surgery as emblematic of the wealthy, glamorous lifestyles he sought to emulate. His parents did not approve of cosmetic enhancements and Jedlica was forced to wait until he could legally make the choice for himself. Four days after his eighteenth birthday, Jedlica underwent his first cosmetic procedure, to reconstruct his nose.

As of 2012, Jedlica had undergone approximately 190 cosmetic procedures. These have included rhinoplasty, chest implants, shoulder implants, bicep implants, triceps implants, brow shaving and lifts, cheek augmentations, subpectoral implants, gluteoplasty, and lip augmentations.

He has appeared in the 1st, 6th, and 7th seasons of Botched. He has also appeared in the 2022 reality series Men of West Hollywood. Most recently, he has appeared in the third episode of Doctor Odyssey, "Plastic Surgery Week".

== Personal life ==
Jedlica was born in Poughkeepsie, New York, the oldest of four siblings. He was brought up in Fishkill, New York and Cary, North Carolina, and graduated from Apex High School where he first discovered his passion for visual and performing arts. Jedlica was raised in the Christian faith and says he considers himself spiritual.

Jedlica is gay and wed his partner, a successful businessman, in a civil ceremony in July 2014 after five years of dating; the couple relocated for business purposes to Chicago and resided in Trump Tower. In 2016 they divorced after two years of marriage.

== See also ==
- Jessica Alves, a Brazilian person who underwent multiple surgeries to look like a Ken doll.
