= Cartel Crew =

American reality television series

- Genre: Reality
- Starring: Michael Corleone Blanco; Marie Ramirez-D’Arellano; Kat "Tatu Baby" Flores; Stephanie Acevedo; Nicole Zavala; Michael Zavala; Carlos "Loz" Oliveros; Dayana Castellanos
- Country of origin: United States
- Original language: English
- No. of seasons: 3
- No. of episodes: 31

Production
- Executive producers: Dan Cesareo; Lucilla D'Agostino; James Knox; Faith Gaskins; Sarah Ebadi; Daniel Blau Rogge; Phakiso Collins; Nina L. Diaz
- Running time: 42–46 minutes
- Production companies: Big Fish Entertainment; VH1 Productions

Original release
- Network: VH1
- Release: January 7, 2019 – August 9, 2021

Cartel Crew is an American reality television series that premiered on VH1 on January 7, 2019. It chronicles the daily lives of people whose families have had previous connections to cartels in Miami, Florida. The series depicts how the individuals attempt to navigate through life and deal with the effects that the cartel has had on their daily lives.

== Cast ==
Cast of Cartel Crew
| Cast member | Seasons | | |
| Cast member | 1 | 2 | 3 |
|---|---|---|---|
| Michael Blanco | Main | Main | Main |
| Marie Ramirez's-D'Arellano | Main | Main | Main |
| Kat "Tatu Baby" Flores | Main | Main | Main |
| Stephanie Acevedo | Main | Main | Main |
| Nicole Zavala | Main | Main | Main |
| Carlos "Loz" Oliveros | Main | Main | |
| Dayana Castellanos | Main | Main | Main |
| Michael Zavala | Recurring | Main | Main |
| Salomé "Betty Idol" Jackson | | Recurring | Main |
| Mike "Majix" Yuen | Recurring | Recurring | Recurring |
| Ali Cabrera Tapia | Recurring | Recurring | Recurring |
| Eddie Soto | | Recurring | Recurring |
| Ivette Saucedo | | Recurring | Recurring |
| Emma Coronel Aispuro | | Guest | |

== Episodes ==
| Season | Episodes | Originally released | |
| Season | Episodes | First released | Last released |
|---|---|---|---|
| 1 | 10 | January 7, 2019 | March 11, 2019 |
| 2 | 11 | October 7, 2019 | December 9, 2019 |
| 3 | 10 | June 7, 2021 | August 9, 2021 |

=== Season 1 (2019) ===
| No. overall | No. in season | Title | Original release date | U.S. viewers (millions) |
|---|---|---|---|---|
| 1 | 1 | "Life After Narcos" | January 7, 2019 | 0.95 |
| 2 | 2 | "She Set Me Up" | January 14, 2019 | 0.93 |
| 3 | 3 | "The Ultimate Disrespect" | January 21, 2019 | 0.81 |
| 4 | 4 | "New York, Old Secrets" | January 28, 2019 | 0.68 |
| 5 | 5 | "Who Is Giselle Rosario?" | February 4, 2019 | 0.67 |
| 6 | 6 | "It's How You Die and When You Die" | February 11, 2019 | 0.69 |
| 7 | 7 | "Forbidden Paradise, Part 1" | February 18, 2019 | 0.76 |
| 8 | 8 | "Forbidden Paradise, Part 2" | February 25, 2019 | 0.58 |
| 9 | 9 | "Back to Miami, Back to Reality" | March 4, 2019 | 0.64 |
| 10 | 10 | "Out With a Boom Boom" | March 11, 2019 | 0.70 |

=== Season 2 (2019) ===
| No. overall | No. in season | Title | Original release date | U.S. viewers (millions) |
|---|---|---|---|---|
| 11 | 1 | "Homecoming" | October 7, 2019 | 0.66 |
| 12 | 2 | "Broken Bonds" | October 14, 2019 | 0.59 |
| 13 | 3 | "A Baby With Satan" | October 21, 2019 | 0.56 |
| 14 | 4 | "Sneak Attack" | October 28, 2019 | 0.55 |
| 15 | 5 | "Anger Iceberg" | November 4, 2019 | 0.64 |
| 16 | 6 | "Prison and Other Bad Decisions" | November 11, 2019 | 0.62 |
| 17 | 7 | "The One With Chapo's Wife" | November 18, 2019 | 0.73 |
| 18 | 8 | "Border Angels" | November 25, 2019 | 0.56 |
| 19 | 9 | "I Know People" | December 2, 2019 | 0.65 |
| 20 | 10 | "Leave the Nightlife Behind" | December 9, 2019 | 0.62 |
| 21 | 11 | "This Isn't Over" | December 9, 2019 | 0.52 |

=== Season 3 (2021) ===
| No. overall | No. in season | Title | Original release date | U.S. viewers (millions) |
|---|---|---|---|---|
| 22 | 1 | "La Famila Over Everything" | June 7, 2021 | 0.46 |
| 23 | 2 | "It's the Prenup for Me" | June 14, 2021 | 0.22 |
| 24 | 3 | "Dear Michael" | June 21, 2021 | 0.40 |
| 25 | 4 | "Never Break Bread with You" | June 28, 2021 | 0.29 |
| 26 | 5 | "What's the Tea" | July 5, 2021 | 0.53 |
| 27 | 6 | "A Very Blanco Wedding Part 1" | July 12, 2021 | 0.51 |
| 28 | 7 | "A Very Blanco Wedding Part 2" | July 19, 2021 | 0.41 |
| 29 | 8 | "Journey for Justice" | July 26, 2021 | 0.37 |
| 30 | 9 | "Part of the Solution" | August 2, 2021 | 0.37 |
| 31 | 10 | "La Familia Forever" | August 9, 2021 | 0.43 |
