= Terry Dubrow =

American plastic surgeon and television personality

- Born: Terry Joel Dubrow; September 14, 1958 (age 68); Los Angeles, California, U.S.
- Education: University of California, Los Angeles (BS); Yale University (MS); David Geffen School of Medicine at UCLA (MD)
- Occupations: Plastic surgeon, television personality
- Spouse: Heather Dubrow (m. 1999)
- Children: 4
- Relatives: Kevin DuBrow (brother)

Terry Joel Dubrow (born September 14, 1958) is an American plastic surgeon and television personality. He is known for his work on The Swan and for co-hosting Botched and its spin-off series Botched by Nature with Paul Nassif. He also appears on The Real Housewives of Orange County with his wife, Heather. In 2015, Dubrow appeared on Good Work, a plastic surgery-themed talk show, together with co-hosts RuPaul and Sandra Vergara. Dubrow also performed the plastic surgery procedures on Bridalplasty, a reality series which premiered in 2011 and featured a group of women who competed in order to win a wedding and transformative plastic surgery procedure.

== Personal life ==
Terry Dubrow was born to Laura and Alvin Dubrow. His family is of Ashkenazi Jewish heritage. He was raised in Los Angeles with his older brother Kevin, who was the lead singer for the popular metal band Quiet Riot for the majority of that band's existence, until his death in 2007. He married actress and The Real Housewives of Orange County star Heather Dubrow (née Kent) in 1999. They have four children.

Dubrow received his medical degree from the University of California, Los Angeles School of Medicine and also holds a master's degree from Yale University. He went on to complete a residency in general surgery and was chief resident at Harbor-UCLA Medical Center and he completed his fellowship in plastic and reconstructive surgery at the UCLA Medical Center. Dubrow is board certified by the American Board of Plastic Surgery, and a Fellow of the American College of Surgeons.

Dubrow and his wife promote a fad diet known as the "Dubrow Diet," based on a form of intermittent fasting. He also has a constant presence on the shopping network ShopHQ, usually selling health products.

In December 2025 he won the "TV Doctor" episode of Celebrity Weakest Link.

== Television ==
Year	Title	Role	Notes
2004	The Swan	Himself	
2010–11	Bridalplasty	Himself	
2014–present	Botched	Himself / co-host	Co-executive producer
2015	Good Work	Himself / co-host	
2016	Botched by Nature	Himself / co-host	Co-executive producer
2019–present	License to Kill	Himself / narrator	Oxygen

== Publications ==
Dr. and Mrs. Guinea Pig Present The Only Guide You'll Ever Need to the Best Anti-Aging Treatments. Ghost Mountain Books. ISBN 1939457556 (2016)

The Dubrow Diet: Interval Eating to Lose Weight and Feel Ageless. Ghost Mountain Books. ISBN 978-1939457714 (2018)

The Dubrow Keto Fusion Diet: The Ultimate Plan for Interval Eating and Sustainable Fat Burning. William Morrow Books. ISBN 0062984322 (2020)
