= Heather Dubrow =

American actress and reality television star

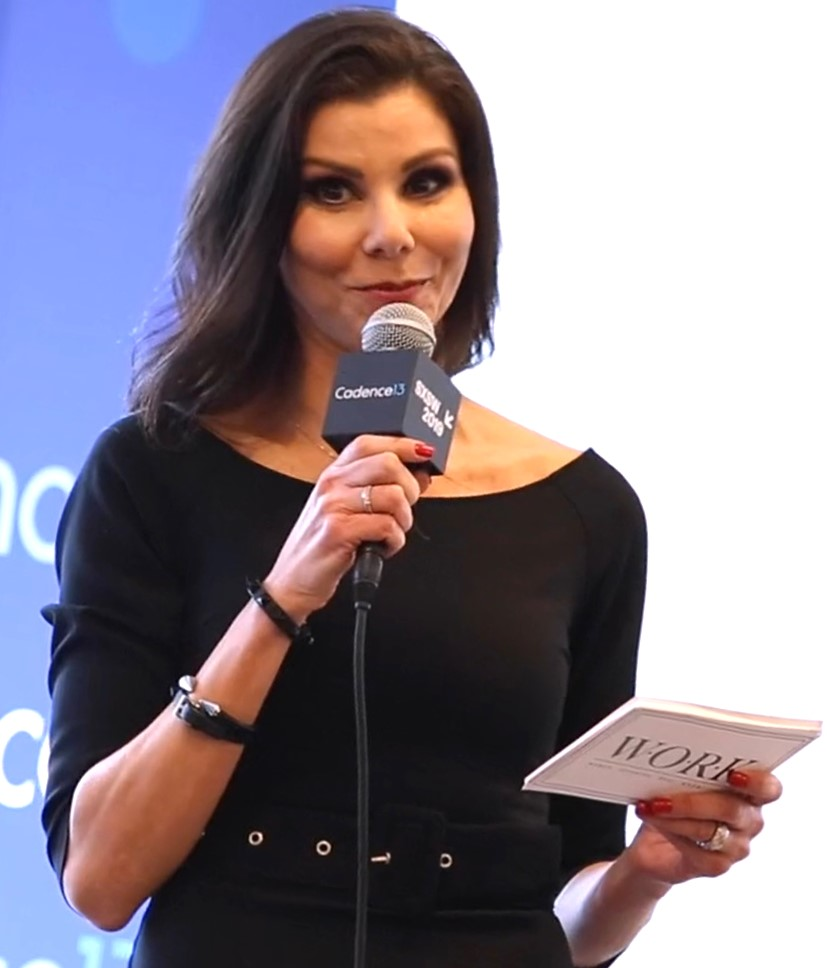
- Dubrow in 2019
- Born: Heather Paige Kent; January 5, 1969 (age 57); The Bronx, New York, USA
- Education: Syracuse University (BFA)
- Occupations: Actress; television personality
- Years active: 1991–present
- Spouse: Terry Dubrow (m. 1999)
- Children: 4
- Relatives: Kevin Dubrow (brother-in-law)
- Website: heatherdubrow.com

Heather Paige Dubrow (née Kent; born January 5, 1969) is an American actress and television personality. She is best known as a cast member of the Bravo reality television series The Real Housewives of Orange County, starring in ten seasons since her introduction in 2012. Her acting credits include her portrayal of Lydia DeLucca on the CBS television series That's Life from 2000 through 2002.

== Career ==
Dubrow was born in the Bronx, a borough of New York City, and grew up in Chappaqua, New York. She is a fifth-generation American of Jewish ancestry (from Germany, Hungary, and Poland). In 1990, she graduated from Syracuse University with a Bachelor of Fine Arts Degree. While at Syracuse, Dubrow joined the Omega chapter of Sigma Delta Tau.

Heather joined The Real Housewives of Orange County in season 7 and left the series after season 11. Dubrow rejoined the cast in 2021 for its 16th season, returned for the show's 17th, 18th, 19th and 20th season. In June 2020, it was announced Dubrow alongside her husband, Terry, would host and executive produce The Seven Year Stitch for E!.

== Personal life ==
In 1999, Dubrow married plastic surgeon Terry Dubrow. They live in Orange County, California, and Los Angeles, California. They have four children: Nicholas, Maximillia, Katarina, and Ace.

== Publications ==
Dr. and Mrs. Guinea Pig Present The Only Guide You'll Ever Need to the Best Anti-Aging Treatments. Ghost Mountain Books. ISBN 1939457556 (2016)

The Dubrow Diet: Interval Eating to Lose Weight and Feel Ageless. Ghost Mountain Books. ISBN 978-1939457714 (2018)

The Dubrow Keto Fusion Diet: The Ultimate Plan for Interval Eating and Sustainable Fat Burning. William Morrow Books. ISBN 0062984322 (2020)

== Filmography ==
Year	Title	Role	Notes
1994	Married... with Children	Cherise	"Naughty But Niece" (season 9, episode 4)
1994	Roseanne and Tom: Behind the Scenes	Kim Silva	TV movie
1995	Nowhere Man	Woman #2	"Absolute Zero" (season 1, episode 1)
1996–97	Life with Roger	Kate	5 episodes (season 1)
1997	Men Behaving Badly	Ellen	"The Odds Couple" (season 1, episode 12)
1997	Jenny	Maggie Marino	series regular
1998	Carly	Carly Morrone	TV movie
1999	Early Edition	Maddie Stefanovich	"Slippity-Doo-Dah" (season 3, episode 12)
1999	The Norm Show	Diane	"Norm Dates a Client" (season 1, episode 2)
1999–2000	Stark Raving Mad	Margaret "Maddie" Keller	22 episodes
2000	The List	Herself	"Best TV Theme Songs" (1 episode)
2000–02	That's Life	Lydia DeLucca	main cast member
2002	The First $20 Million Is Always the Hardest	Claudia Goss	
2002	Now You Know	Marty	movie
2005	Untitled Camryn Manheim pilot		unaired
2009	Surviving Suburbia	Mrs. Spillman	2 episodes
2012	Chelsea Lately	Bride	1 episode
2012	Marie	Herself	"Melissa Peterman" (1 episode)
2012–2016, 2021–	The Real Housewives of Orange County	Herself	Main Cast (seasons 7–11, 16–)
2013	Malibu Country	Brooke	"Cold Shower" (season 1, episode 9)
2013	Tamra's OC Wedding	Herself	The Real Housewives of Orange County spinoff series
2013	Hot in Cleveland	Nikki	"The Conversation" (season 4, episode 9)
2013	Hawaii Five-0	Emily	"Pukana" (season 4, episode 11)
2013–14	Good Day L.A.	Herself	substitute cohost, 14 episodes
2014	Sequestered	Marisa	a Crackle original series
2015	Botched: Post Op	Herself	cohost, 3 episodes
2017	Young & Hungry	Natasha Cook Campbell	"Young & Kiki" (1 episode)
2023	Celebrity Family Feud	Herself	"Pete Holmes vs. Jared Padalecki and Real Housewives of OC vs. Real Housewives of ATL" (season 10, episode 6)
2024	"Days of Girlhood"	Mom	music video
2024	Million Dollar Listing Los Angeles	Herself	"Mo’ Money, Mo’ Problems" (season 15, episode 8)
