= The Real Housewives of Orange County season 13 =

Season of television series

The Real Housewives of Orange County
- Season 13
- Cover used by the iTunes Store; Left to right: Kirschenheiter, Simpson, Beador, Gunvalson, Judge and Dodd
- Starring: Vicki Gunvalson; Tamra Judge; Shannon Beador; Kelly Dodd; Gina Kirschenheiter; Emily Simpson
- No. of episodes: 21

Release
- Original network: Bravo
- Original release: July 16 – December 9, 2018

Season chronology
- ← Previous; Season 12 Next → Season 14

The thirteenth season of The Real Housewives of Orange County, an American reality television series, was broadcast on Bravo. It aired from July 16, 2018, until December 9, 2018, and is primarily filmed in Orange County, California. Its executive producers are Adam Karpel, Alex Baskin, Douglas Ross, Gregory Stewart, Scott Dunlop, Stephanie Boyriven and Andy Cohen.

The thirteenth season of The Real Housewives of Orange County focuses on the lives of Vicki Gunvalson, Tamra Judge, Shannon Beador, Kelly Dodd, Gina Kirschenheiter and Emily Simpson.

This season marked the first departure from the only remaining original cast member, Vicki Gunvalson. She eventually returned for the show's 20th season.

== Cast and synopsis ==
Following the conclusion of the twelfth season, Meghan King Edmonds, Lydia McLaughlin and Peggy Sulahian left the show. For the thirteenth season, Vicki Gunvalson, Tamra Judge, Shannon Beador and Kelly Dodd all returned to the series, with Gina Kirschenheiter and Emily Simpson joining the cast.

== Episodes ==
The Real Housewives of Orange County season 13 episodes
No. overall	No. in season	Title	Original release date	U.S. viewers (millions)
212	1	"The Next Chapter"	July 16, 2018	1.41
After the surprising reconciliation between Vicki, Tamra, and Shannon at last season's reunion, the ladies are working to rebuild their friendship and regain each other's trust. Tamra has moved into a new home, and as part of their divorces, both Shannon and Kelly have downsized, while also adjusting to live as single mothers. Vicki, who has marriage on the brain, is now cohabitating with her boyfriend Steve, though he is in no rush to pop the question. Tamra goes on a hike with her estranged friend Emily to try to clear the air, but at home is dealing with Eddie's health scare. With the help of her friends, Shannon finally takes off her wedding ring and Kelly brings the ladies together for a ropes course.
213	2	"One Apology, Another Betrayal"	July 23, 2018	1.46
In the wake of Vicki repairing her friendship with Tamra, Vicki must face one last hurdle and apologize to Eddie. Tamra teaches an exercise class and introduces her new friend Gina to the ladies; Emily and Shane celebrate their ninth anniversary.
214	3	"Tres Amigas"	July 30, 2018	1.41
Kelly's argument with Vicki continues; Tamra and Vicki fly to Mexico for a girls weekend to help break Shannon out of her shell. A night of dancing on the bars ends with a real injury and the trio opening up about their real vulnerabilities.
215	4	"Judge, Jury and Gina"	August 6, 2018	1.35
Gina causes a stir at a group dinner and riles up Shannon. Emily faces struggles with her husband taking the bar exam. Kelly and Vicky struggle to see eye to eye after the betrayal with Michael and his new girlfriend. Shannon gets her daughter's opinion on her new business venture.
216	5	"Orange County Hold 'Em"	August 13, 2018	1.52
New divorcees Shannon and Kelly bond during a night out on the town, making Tamra feel left out; Vicki pushes her son to marry his girlfriend; Shannon makes progress on her new business venture with QVC; Emily hosts a poker party.
217	6	"Rumors"	August 20, 2018	1.42
The women are surprised to learn how poker night ended; Vicki records radio commercials and ends up embarrassing her son; Shannon gets emotional as she goes to court; Tamra surprises Shannon with the gift of a matchmaker; Kelly dates the milkman.
218	7	"She Said/She Said"	August 27, 2018	1.50
Hijinks ensue when Vicki decides to celebrate her birthday with a ladies' golf outing; Tamra and Eddie double date with Emily and her husband; a rumor about Emily's marriage sparks an unexpected confrontation between Tamra and Shannon.
219	8	"Seeing Red"	September 10, 2018	1.55
Tamra hounds Steve to propose to Vicki; Gina makes a confession about her marriage; Tamra throws Eddie a birthday party. At the party, Kelly's plan to confront Steve goes awry and she ends up arguing with Emily's husband Shane.
220	9	"A Peace Treaty, a Blind Date, and a Divorce No One Understands"	September 17, 2018	1.54
An explosive comment causes Eddie's birthday party to end in shambles. Shannon goes on a date; Vicki battles the rumors about her relationship with Steve. While the women react to Ginas marital news, Emily and Kelly try to work out their issues.
221	10	"Italian Fight Night"	September 24, 2018	1.32
Vicki sets the record straight after Kelly continues to tell stories about Steve. Gina's parents visit from Long Island; Vicki throws an Italian-themed party. An overwhelmed Gina sneaks off to the bathroom to call an unexpected person for help.
222	11	"8 1/2 Minutes of Success"	October 1, 2018	1.36
Shannon flies to Philadelphia with her daughter Sophie for her first appearance on QVC. Kelly watches her daughter Jolie audition for a musical and Steve takes Vicki on her first ride on a motorcycle.
223	12	"Nice to Meet You... Again"	October 8, 2018	1.27
Vicki wants to be a better friend to Gina, but questions her decision on getting divorced. Gina and Emily bond over their inability to get to know Shannon and Kelly stuns Shannon when she tells her Emily and Gina feel boxed out by her.
224	13	"Heat Waves and Hot Flashes"	October 15, 2018	1.31
In Jamaica, the heat gets to everyone. Shannon laughs it up in a salt scrub with Vicki and Kelly and Gina shares an emotional moment with the ladies. After some fun and games on bamboo rafts and rope swings, tension erupts between Shannon and Tamra.
225	14	"Blow Up"	October 22, 2018	1.44
In Jamaica, Gina confronts Shannon at dinner about not being a good friend to Tamra during Eddie's health issues and Shannon feels betrayed when Tamra doesn't defend her. Shannon isolates herself from the group and misses bobsledding.
226	15	"The Day After"	October 29, 2018	1.35
Shannon continues to isolate herself while the women clime a gorgeous waterfall. Vicki coaxesShannon to rejoin the group for a beach-side dinner, where Shannon makes amends with only a few of the women. An unexpected phone call makes Emily emotional.
227	16	"Twin Tweaks"	November 5, 2018	1.34
Vicki and Shannon proceed with dueling plastic surgeries. Emily and Shane attend couples therapy and face a painful memory. Gina gets herself in hot water with Tamra after she confesses to Shannon about what the ladies were saying behind her back.
228	17	"Friends and Enemas"	November 12, 2018	1.45
Vicki is confronted by her son Michael for not letting him know about her most recent procedure. Tamra and Gina's conflict continues at Emily's Turkish coffee cup reader gathering. Kelly questions if Shannon may be manipulation the rift between Tamra and Gina.
229	18	"Femme Finale"	November 19, 2018	1.18
Emily plans a Femme Fatale party for the ladies, as her mother, Susan, visits Orange County for the first time in five years. Shannon has a very adult conversaty with her 16-year-old daughter, Sophie. Tamra and Gina try to hash out their issues.
230	19	"Reunion Part 1"	November 25, 2018	1.51
Vicki, Tamra, and Shannon rehash their whirlwind trip to Mexico. Vicki reflects on her efforts to get Steve to propose. Gina opens up about her divorce, and sparks fly when Vicki and Kelly go head to head, culminating in a shocking claim by Vicki.
231	20	"Reunion Part 2"	December 2, 2018	1.71
Kelly and Vicki continue to hash out their issues and the women chime in about Shannon's divorce. Emily opens up about the body shaming she received online and emotions run high as Tamra and Shannon tackle their fractured friendship.
232	21	"Reunion Part 3"	December 9, 2018	1.47
Emily, Shannon, Kelly, and Gina talk about Eddie's birthday party. The women relive the tension from their Jamaica trip and they explore what happened to cause Shannon's meltdown. The women share their list of regrets.
