= The Real Housewives of Orange County season 14 =

The Real Housewives of Orange County
- Season 14
- Cover used by the iTunes Store; Left to right: Simpson, Windham-Burke, Dodd, Beador, Judge, and Kirschenheiter.
- Starring: Tamra Judge; Shannon Storms Beador; Kelly Dodd; Gina Kirschenheiter; Emily Simpson; Braunwyn Windham-Burke
- No. of episodes: 23

Release
- Original network: Bravo
- Original release: August 6 – December 26, 2019

Season chronology
- ← Previous; Season 13 Next → Season 15

The fourteenth season of The Real Housewives of Orange County, an American reality television series, was broadcast on Bravo. It aired on August 6, 2019, until December 26, 2019, and is primarily filmed in Orange County, California. Its executive producers are Adam Karpel, Alex Baskin, Douglas Ross, Gregory Stewart, Scott Dunlop, Stephanie Boyriven and Andy Cohen.

The fourteenth season of The Real Housewives of Orange County focuses on the lives of Tamra Judge, Shannon Storms Beador, Kelly Dodd, Gina Kirschenheiter, Emily Simpson and Braunwyn Windham-Burke. Original housewife Vicki Gunvalson appeared as a friend of the housewives.

This season marked the first departure of Tamra Judge. She eventually returned for the show's 17th season.

== Cast and synopsis ==
Following the conclusion of the thirteenth season, Vicki Gunvalson was demoted to a friend after thirteen seasons of being a main housewife. Tamra Judge, Shannon Beador, Kelly Dodd, Gina Kirschenheiter and Emily Simpson all returned with new cast member Braunwyn Windham-Burke joining the show. Former housewives Alexis Bellino and Meghan King Edmonds also returned in guest appearance. Gunvalson’s demotion made the series the second Real Housewives franchise to not retain any original cast members as full-time participants after season 8 of The Real Housewives of Atlanta.

Following the season finale, Gunvalson departed the franchise after fourteen seasons. Soon after, Tamra Judge announced her departure from the show as well.

== Episodes ==
The Real Housewives of Orange County season 14 episodes
No. overall	No. in season	Title	Original release date	U.S. viewers (millions)
233	1	"New Friends, New Flames"	August 6, 2019	1.42
While Tamra settles into her new house, Shannon strikes up a friendship with Housewife Braunwyn. Gina is dealing with the consequences of her DUI while dating a new man. Emily takes on the role of a single mother, and Kelly becomes smitten with a successful plastic surgeon.
234	2	"(Not So Happy) Housewarming"	August 13, 2019	1.44
While her mother looks after their seven children, Brauwnyn and Sean spend Valentine's Day at their love shack. Tamra invites the girls to her housewarming celebration and warns Kelly of Vicki's presence. Emily hosts her in0laws to celebrate their birthdays.
235	3	"All Aboard the Rumor Train"	August 20, 2019	1.48
Kelly's abrupt exit pushes others to speak up as Tamra's party continues.Gina confesses a painful secret to Emily, and Shannon and Braunwyn bond over parenting challenges. A fresh alarming rumour surfaces later, when Kelly is away in Aspen.
236	4	"Breakdown in Beverly Hills"	August 27, 2019	1.46
Kelly and Braunwyn watch Emily rehears her anniversary dance number. Shannon organizes a group day trip to Rodeo Drive so Gina can see it for the first time. Emily breaks down regarding personal concerns while in Beverly Hills. Shannon and Emily argue over a comment made during an interview and Kelly explodes.
237	5	"Liar, Liar, Friendship on Fire"	September 3, 2019	1.43
Shannon surprises the gang with tourist attire and a double decker bus ride through Hollywood as the day trip to Beverly Hills continues. Braunwyn is confronted by Tamra about conversing with her enemies behind her back. Emily leaves the trip early in order to see Shane once he returns from passing the Bar test, but she is upset when he is not enthused about seeing her again. Braunwyn sits down for supper with her mother, Dr. Deb, and admits to lying to her new pals, but blames it on her unusual upbringing. When Tamra and Shannon join a hip-hop dancing lesson, they learn more about Braunwyn. Gina fails to appear in court, and a warrant for her arrest is issued.
238	6	"Family Affair"	September 10, 2019	1.34
Gina's increasing connection with Shannon poses a threat to Emily. On their forthcoming vacation to Arizona, Tamra and Shannon advise Vicki on how to deal with Kelly. Kelly is dealing with family troubles, and her brother JR encourages her to mend her strained bonds with her mother and younger brother. Emily's constant attempts to persuade Gina to join the Vegas trip irritate her. Over dinner, Kelly, Shannon, and Tamra get to know Braunwyn's quirky mother in the hopes of persuading Kelly to join the group trip to Arizona.
239	7	"Dance Like No One Is Watching"	September 17, 2019	1.40
240	8	"Let's Get Metaphysical"	September 24, 2019	1.38
As Kelly deals with the consequences after hitting Shannon on the head, Emily and Gina's strained friendship reaches a breaking point, and Tamra attempts to make a reconciliation between Kelly and Shannon.
241	9	"Miracle at Miraval"	October 1, 2019	1.35
Kelly attacks the Tres Amigas after the rumor is revealed. An emotional dinner conversation leads to an unexpected apology.
242	10	"Big O's and Broken Toes"	October 8, 2019	1.40
Due to a fractured toe, Gina's double date with Shane's cousin is canceled. Emily seeks weight-loss assistance from Tamra and Eddie, only to discover that the situation is far more dire than she anticipated. Braunwyn has a photo shoot with her family. Emily meets up with former Housewife, Alexis Bellino. Meanwhile, Kelly continues to visit old acquaintances and her brother JR in Arizona, despite her efforts to reconnect with her younger brother Eric and mother Bobbi.
243	11	"Hot Mess Express"	October 15, 2019	1.26
Shannon's birthday trip to Del Mar includes Vicki and former Housewife Meghan. While Tamra and Braunwyn's infatuation heats up, Gina feels betrayed by Emily.
244	12	"Fashion Show Faux Pas"	October 22, 2019	1.37
Rowan, Braunwyn's daughter, makes her OC Fashion Week debut where drama erupts. Eddie later finds out about Tamra and Braunwyn's wild night out in Del Mar.
245	13	"Spilling Tea and Throwing Shade"	October 29, 2019	1.33
Vicki's birthday is celebrated with a royal tea party, and the women assemble to revel. Kelly is adamant about not going. Gina and Braunwyn clash at the party, and whispers about Kelly have the ladies up in arms.
246	14	"Best Frenemies Forever"	November 5, 2019	1.28
Kelly has Braunwyn in her crosshairs due to Tea Party chatter, but Braunwyn defends herself and reveals who really talked about Kelly. Shannon is taken aback when she learns that someone has been critical of her.
247	15	"The Orange Doesn't Fall Far From the Tree"	November 12, 2019	1.36
Shannon and Braunwyn assist their daughters in their college preparation. Gina receives some advice from her mother that makes her reconsider her decision. Kelly gets advice from Emily and Brauwnyn about her estranged mother. Shannon and Tamra discuss the situation.
248	16	"Viral Videos and Vendettas"	November 19, 2019	1.22
Tamra's video of her mentioning the Kelly rumors goes viral. Kelly contacts her mother while Shannon prepares for divorce court. Braunwyn holds a weaning party to commemorate the end of her nineteen-year breastfeeding journey.
249	17	"Florida Fun and Fury"	November 26, 2019	1.35
Vicki delivers a very important announcement. When Kelly insults Shannon, a night out partying takes a dramatic turn.
250	18	"Wild, Wild Key West"	December 3, 2019	1.38
Shannon spills the beans when Gina and Emily fail to persuade Vicki to tell Kelly the truth. An accident occurs later, requiring another ambulance transport.
251	19	"Some Fences are Made to Be Broken"	December 10, 2019	1.34
Vicki returns from the hospital with a sprained ankle, capping off their trip to Florida. Gina tackles her anxieties of murky water as Tamra and Shannon go parasailing. Kelly tries to make amends with some of the women on a sunset cruise. Dr. Brian wonders if he and Kelly should live together back in the OC. Tamra ultimately gathers her sons in the same room after Gina tells her mother that she is calling off her divorce. Meanwhile, Emily and Kelly attend an anger management program in the hopes of Kelly attending Vicki's upcoming engagement party.
252	20	"Whooping It Up for Wedding Bells"	December 17, 2019	1.24
Shannon has a date with a man she intends to invite to Vicki's engagement celebration. Emily assists Gina in packing her Coto home. Braunwyn and her mother, Dr. Deb, get together for yoga while avoiding their unsolved concerns. Emily is taken aback by a doctor's diagnosis. The ladies throw a "farmhouse chic" party to celebrate Vicki's engagement, but Tamra breaks down when she sees Kelly.
253	21	"Reunion Part 1"	December 18, 2019	0.93
Shannon gives an update on her love life. Emily and Gina's friendship is dissected. Vicki grows agitated backstage, and the women hear about Vicki's love tank. The women discuss the unforgettable trip to Miraval including the gong heard around the world.
254	22	"Reunion Part 2"	December 23, 2019	1.12
The reunion continue as tensions between Kelly and the Tres Amigas rise as the ladies continue to argue about what happened at Miraval, particularly the rumors that were thrown at Kelly. Braunwyn discusses how her relationship with her mother, Dr. Deb, has been strained as a result of the show. The Kelly versus Vicki conflict is revisited, and Kelly becomes distraught about the loss of her old friend. Tamra updated us on her new business and her family. Kelly and Shannon get into a violent fight over Tamra's genuine goals as a friend. When the topic of the group trip to Florida comes up, Vicki surprises everyone by claiming that Braunwyn and her wilder ways have "destroyed" the show.
255	23	"Reunion Part 3"	December 26, 2019	1.02
The reunion concludes when Vicki tries to shame Braunwyn over her actions. Andy bids Vicki farewell, Emily recounts her worst year, and Shane joins the ladies to offer an unexpected perspective on their marriage. Gina's emotional and trying year is addressed, including a police-involved post-season incident. With a nod to their trip to Miraval, the ladies salute to a memorable season 14.
