= Debra L. Ness =

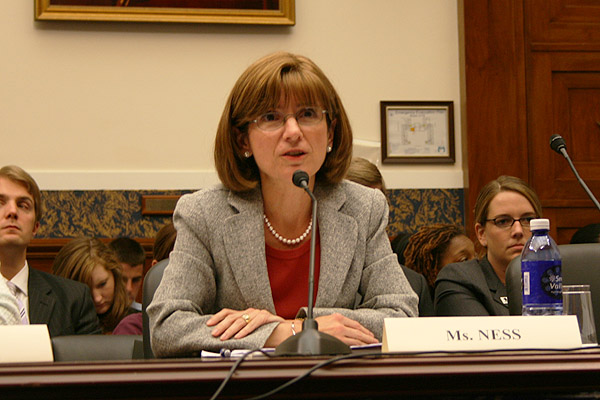
Ness testifying at a U.S. congressional hearing on FMLA, July 2009

Debra L. Ness is the former president of the National Partnership for Women & Families. She has previously worked for the Service Employees International Union and National Abortion Rights Action League.

== Career ==
Ness graduated summa cum laude from Drew University with an undergraduate degree in psychology and sociology. Ness received a Master of Science from the Columbia University School of Social Work in social welfare and public policy.

From 1980 to 1986, Ness worked at the Service Employees International Union (SEIU). In 1986, Ness moved to the National Abortion Rights Action League (NARAL) to head up field operations, and in 1989 was promoted to deputy director of the organization. In 1991, Ness joined the National Partnership for Women & Families (then the Women’s Legal Defense Fund) as executive vice president. In 2004, she assumed her current position as president.

Ness also serves as the leader of the Campaign for Better Care, a health care initiative of the National Partnership for Women & Families, Community Catalyst, the Leadership Conference on Civil and Human Rights, and the National Health Law Program. It is funded by Atlantic Philanthropies.

Under Ness’s leadership, First Lady Michelle Obama said of the National Partnership in 2011, “Thanks to your tremendous efforts, the landscape of this nation has been fundamentally changed for the better: our workplaces are more family friendly, women and girls do have more opportunities, and many discriminatory practices have been completely abolished.”

== Notable contributions ==
Ness is a recurring contributor to the Huffington Post.

Ness has provided expert testimony at more than a dozen congressional hearings. She advocated for paid sick leave policies during the 2009 swine flu pandemic before the House of Representatives Education and Labor Committee and the Senate Health Subcommittee on Children and Families. Ness has testified in support of the Healthy Families Act and the FIRST Act before the House Education Subcommittee on Workforce Protections. She has spoken before the House Energy Subcommittee on Health, endorsing H.R. 3200, America’s Affordable Health Choices Act of 2009, and H.R. 2279, Eliminating Disparities in Breast Cancer Treatment Act of 2009.

== Notes ==
Preceded by Judith L. Lichtman	President of the National Partnership for Women & Families; 2004–present	Incumbent
