= Wade Henderson =

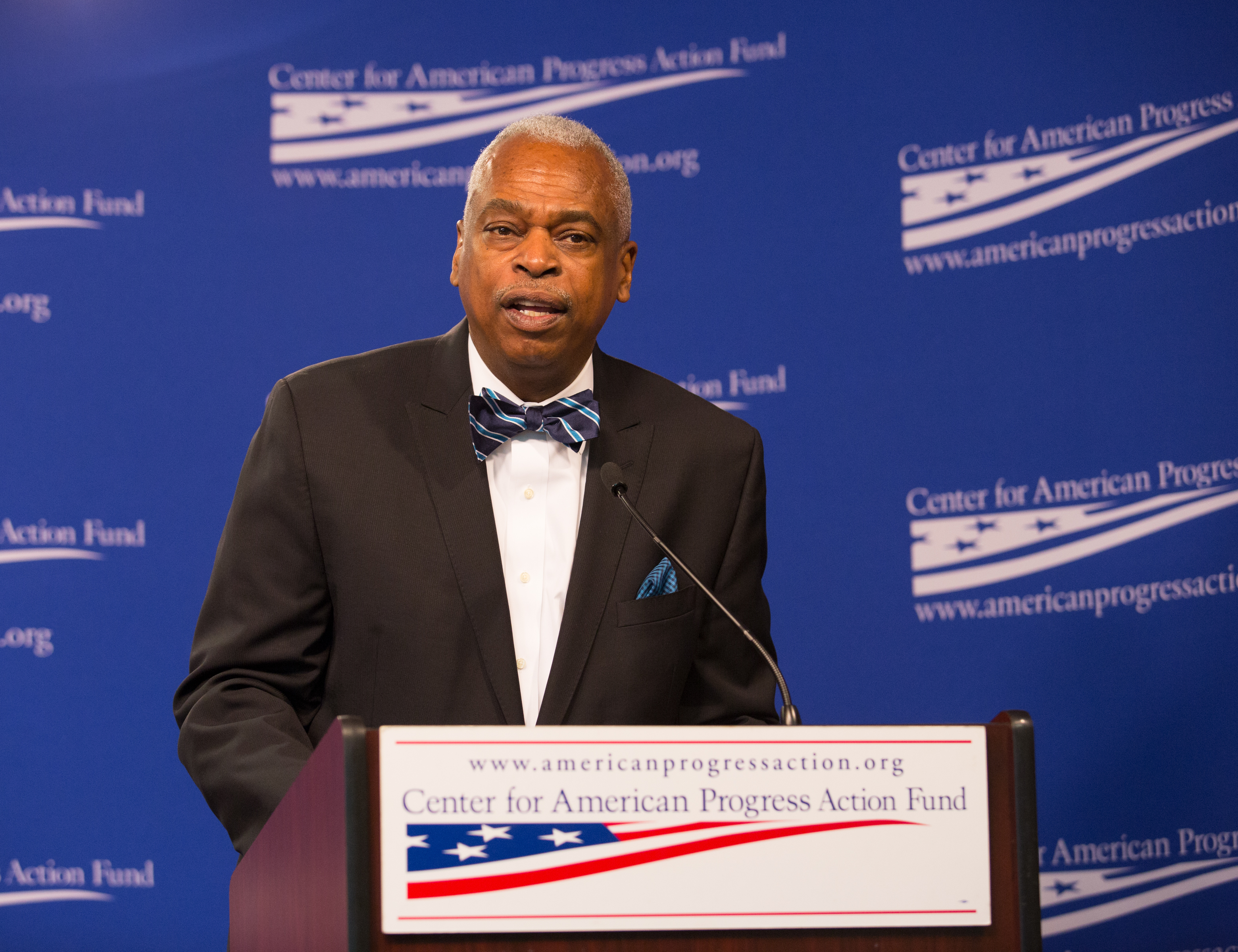

President of the Leadership Conference on Civil and Human Rights
- In office January 7, 2021 – May 2, 2022
- Preceded by: Vanita Gupta
- Succeeded by: Maya Wiley
- In office 1996–2016
- Succeeded by: Vanita Gupta

Personal details
- Born: April 22, 1948 (age 78) Washington, D.C., U.S.
- Education: Howard University (BA); Rutgers University, Newark (JD)

Wade J. Henderson (born April 22, 1948) is an African-American advocate, community leader and governmental activist. He has served as president of the Leadership Conference on Civil and Human Rights (LCCHR) and counsel to the Leadership Conference Education Fund.

== Career ==
He is a graduate of Howard University and the Rutgers University School of Law, and a member of the bars of the District of Columbia and the Supreme Court of the United States. He is the founder and president of Wade J. Henderson, LLC, which gives strategic advice on civil and human rights issues, and a former Joseph L. Rauh, Jr., Professor of Public Interest Law at the David A. Clarke School of Law, University of the District of Columbia. Henderson was the Washington Bureau director of the NAACP from 1991 to 1996, where he directed the organization's government affairs and national legislative program.

Henderson has participated in social justice coalitions and developed strategies for local and international civil and human rights policies, among other public actions. During his tenure as president, LCCHR policy initiatives included reauthorizing the Voting Rights Act and lobbying for passage of the Help America Vote Act, the Fair Sentencing Act, the Lily Ledbetter Fair Pay Act, the ADA Amendments Act, the Matthew Shepard and James Byrd, Jr., Hate Crimes Prevention Act, and the Dodd-Frank Wall Street Reform and Consumer Protection Act. He also supported the confirmations of U.S. Supreme Court Justices Sonia Sotomayor and Elena Kagan, and U.S. Attorneys General Eric Holder and Loretta Lynch.

During Henderson's tenure as president of the Leadership Conference on Civil and Human Rights the organization grew from 170 to 230 member organizations. He has attended human rights conferences in Geneva, Switzerland, Germany, South Africa, Israel, and Chile. In 2015, he testified before the U.N. General Assembly to call for an international response to the global rise of anti-Semitism and other hate crimes.

From 2007-2011 Henderson served on the Federal Deposit Insurance Corporation (FDIC) Advisory Committee on Economic Inclusion, which was created in 2006 to provide the FDIC with advice and recommendations on access to banking services by underserved populations. He also advocated for fair-chance hiring practices at banks to give ex-offenders a chance at securing work.

As of February 2021, Henderson's volunteer activities focused on improving educational and financial opportunities for disadvantaged populations. He is a member of the Board of Directors and a pro bono advisor at the Center for Responsible Lending, a member of the Board of Trustees of the Educational Testing Service and a member of the Foundation Board of Directors of the District of Columbia School of Law (DCSL).

Before his role with The Leadership Conference, Henderson directed the Washington Bureau of the NAACP. He directed the organization’s government affairs and national legislative programs; and served as associate director of the Washington office of the American Civil Liberties Union.

== Awards ==
- Honorary Doctorate, Queens College School of Law, City University of New York
- Honorary Doctorate, Gettysburg College
- Member, Kappa Alpha Psi fraternity
