= 101st U.S. Senator =

101st U.S. senator is a nickname used for non-elected figures in American politics, and may refer to:

- Bobby Baker (1928–2017), political advisor
- Judith L. Lichtman, attorney and women's rights advocate
- Pete Rouse (born 1946), political consultant
- Clarence Mitchell Jr. (1911–1984), civil rights activist
- Sharon Soderstrom, government official
