= NCHC =

NCHC may refer to:

- National Coalition on Health Care
- National Collegiate Honors Council
- National Center for High-Performance Computing
- National Collegiate Hockey Conference
- National Clogging and Hoedown Council
- North Carolina Hardcore Scene
