= Ralph Neas =

American businessman and political activist (born 1946)

Ralph G. Neas (born May 17, 1946) is an American civil rights activist and executive. He is best known for directing a series of national campaigns to strengthen and protect civil rights laws during the Reagan and Bush presidencies. He is also known for chairing the national coalition that helped defeat the U.S. Supreme Court nomination of Robert Bork.

Neas served as executive director of the Leadership Conference on Civil Rights; president and CEO of People For the American Way (PFAW) and the PFAW Foundation; president and CEO of the National Coalition on Health Care; and president and CEO of the Generic Pharmaceutical Association (GPhA). He served for eight years as chief legislative assistant to Republican Senators Edward Brooke of Massachusetts and David Durenberger of Minnesota. He remained a member of the Republican Party until October 1996.

== Early life and education ==
Neas was born on May 17, 1946, in Brookline, Massachusetts. In 1955, the Neas family moved from New England to St. Charles, Illinois. There, Neas' father, Ralph Sr., began a career as a salesman for the American Brass Company. Neas quit public high school and attended Marmion Military Academy (Aurora, Illinois), a private Benedictine military school to set himself up for success in attending university.

Neas states that major influences before he left for college and law school were his parents, the teachings of Vatican II, his love for baseball, the civil rights movement, and the lessons he learned at Marmion.

Neas graduated from Marmion Military Academy in 1964. He earned a B.A. with honors from the University of Notre Dame in 1968, and a J.D. from the University of Chicago Law School in 1971.

== Career ==
=== U.S. Senate ===
Neas was both active duty and reserve in the United States Army (1968–1976). In late 1971, he joined the Congressional Research Service's American Law Division at the Library of Congress as a legislative attorney on civil rights. In January 1973, he was hired as a legislative assistant to Republican Senator Edward W. Brooke of Massachusetts, eventually becoming the Senator's chief legislative assistant. He stayed with Senator Brooke until his defeat in 1978, at which time he accepted a job as chief legislative assistant to Republican Senator David Durenberger of Minnesota.

Neas' work in the U.S. Senate spanned eight years. During that time, he focused primarily on civil rights, including the 1975 extension and expansion of the Voting Rights Act of 1965, and the protection of Title IX, reproduction rights, and Title VI and Title VII of the 1964 Civil Rights Act. Neas also worked on the Watergate scandal, health care, and ethics reform. While working for Senator Durenberger in 1979–1980, he conceived and drafted the "Women's Economic Equity Act," parts of which were enacted during the Reagan and Bush Administrations.

=== Leadership Conference on Civil Rights (LCCR) ===
From 1981 through 1995, Neas served as executive director of the nonpartisan Leadership Conference on Civil Rights (LCCR), the legislative arm of the civil rights movement. Neas coordinated successful national campaigns that led to the Civil Rights Act of 1991; the Americans with Disabilities Act; the Civil Rights Restoration Act; the Fair Housing Act Amendments of 1988; the Japanese American Civil Liberties Act; the preservation of the Executive Order on Affirmative Action (1985–1986 and 1995–1996); and the 1982 Voting Right Act Extension. Final passage on all these laws averaged 85% in both the House of Representatives and the Senate; in addition, another 15 Leadership Conference on Civil Rights legislative priorities were enacted into law in the 1981–1995 period.

Neas pointed out during July 11, 1996, testimony before the House Democratic Caucus, Committee on Organization Study and Review regarding Bipartisan Cooperation in Congress, "the average final passage vote on these laws was 85%" in both the House and Senate.

William T. Taylor, former General Counsel and Staff Director of the United States Commission on Civil Rights, and then an LCCR executive committee member wrote that Neas "seemed an unlikely choice [because] he was a white male Catholic Republican who had gone to Notre Dame, where he devoted himself to becoming an officer in the ROTC."

He was chair of the Block Bork Coalition in 1987.

=== Political career ===
In 1998, Neas ran against incumbent Republican Representative Connie Morella in Maryland's 8th Congressional District, composed primarily of the suburban areas just northwest of Washington, DC. Morella defeated Neas 60% to 40%.

=== People For the American Way ===
In late 1999, Neas was named the president and CEO of People For the American Way and People For the American Way Foundation. For eight years, Neas helped lead national efforts to preserve an independent and fair judiciary; to protect civil rights and civil liberties; and to defend and reform public schools in the United States.

In addition, Neas helped put together civic engagement partnerships to recruit and manage 25,000 volunteers in 2004 for the non-partisan and nationally recognized Election Protection program (to help ensure every vote counts), to direct non-partisan programs that registered 525,000 African and Latino voters in three years, and to establish youth leadership development programs across the country (Young People For and Young Elected Officials).

=== National Coalition on Health Care (NCHC) ===
In late 2007, Neas became active in the health care reform movement, becoming senior advisor to the president of the National Coalition on Health Care (NCHC), a non-partisan coalition of more than 80 national organizations (representing consumer groups, medical societies, civil rights groups, small and large businesses, civil right groups, pension funds, disability senior citizens unions and senior citizen and good government organizations). In February 2009, Neas became the CEO of NCHC to help lead the final push for the Affordable Care Act, focusing on system-wide reform, quality health care, cost containment, and the need for bipartisanship. Neas also worked closely with the generic pharmaceutical industry to convey the importance of promoting generics as a critical cost saving and pro-consumer strategy to ensure a sustainable health care system.

=== Generic Pharmaceutical Association ===
On September 12, 2011, Neas became president and CEO of the Generic Pharmaceutical Association (GPhA), which represents the manufacturers and distributors of finished generic pharmaceuticals.

Neas and GPhA played a leadership role in protecting the Hatch-Waxman Act; enacting the Generic Drug User Fees Act; promoting and defending biosimilars at the national and state levels; and making sure that international trade agreements did not favor manufacturers of brand medicines and biologics.

During Neas' tenure, GPhA also launched the Biosimilars Council.

== Teaching ==
Neas has taught law school and undergraduate courses on the legislative process, the United States Constitution, public policy, and the media. These courses have been offered at, among other places:

- the University of Chicago Law School "Lecturer in the Law"
- the Georgetown University Law Center,
- Harvard Kennedy School, Institute of Politics
- University of Southern California, Fellow at the USC Center for the Political Future

== Author ==
Neas is a frequent contributor to the Huffington Post. His published works include more than fifty articles, op-eds, and commentaries in national and regional media outlets.

== Media appearances ==
Neas has been frequently interviewed in the print and electronic media, including CBS's Face the Nation, ABC's Nightline, CBS's Sunday Morning, NBC's Today Show, ABC's This Week, PBS NewsHour, the nightly news shows of ABC, NBC, CBS, CNN, and Fox; National Public Radio; and national, regional, and local newspapers.

Between 1979 and 2016, both the New York Times and the Washington Post cited Neas several hundred times. The Wall Street editorial pages have discussed Neas in more than 45 editorials and op-eds.

Neas has made more than 50 appearances on C-SPAN. In 2009, along with Senators Patrick Leahy (D-Ver) and Arlen Specter (R and then D-Pa), and conservative activist Manny Miranda Neas was the subject of a film documentary entitled Advise and Dissent; In 2014–2016, Neas was featured in a play by Anthony Giardina, "City of Conversation", at the Lincoln Center in New York, the Arena Stage in Washington, D.C, and in theaters in other parts of the United States.

== Awards ==
- Hubert H. Humphrey Civil Rights Award from LCCR;
- Benjamin Hooks "Keeper of the Flame" award from the National Association for the Advancement of Colored People (NAACP), the 91st Annual Convention, Baltimore, Maryland, July 10, 2000;
- Public Service Achievement Award from Common Cause
- Edward M. Kennedy Lifetime Achievement Award from the Disability Rights Education and Defense Fund—November 10, 1994;
- National Good Guy Award" from the National Women's Political Caucus;
- "Isaiah Award for the Pursuit of Justice" from the American Jewish Committee, Washington D.C. Chapter, October 5, 1994;
- "Flag Bearer Award" from PFLAG (formerly known as Parents, Families, and Friends of Lesbians and Gays), 1995;
- Edison Uno Memorial Civil Rights Award from the Japanese American Citizens League; 31st JACL Biennial Convention, San Diego, California, 1990;
- University of Chicago Alumni Public Service Citation;
- "Citizen of the Year" award from the Guillian-Barre Syndrome Foundation International;
- The Lawyers' Committee for Civil Rights Under Law for efforts to enact the Civil Rights Act of 1991, January 15, 1992;
- "The Americans with Disabilities Act Award" from the Task Force on the Rights of the Empowerment of Americans with Disabilities for "historic leadership regarding the enactment of the world's first comprehensive civil rights law for people with disabilities" October 12, 1990;
- Marmion Military Academy's "Centurion" Alumni Achievement Award, March 13, 1991, North Aurora, Illinois;
- Civil Rights Leadership Award from the Religious Action Center for Reform Judaism at the Embassy of Israel, January, 1988;
- Rosa Parks Award" by the American Association for Affirmative Action, April, 1996, AAAA 22nd Annual Conference, Philadelphia, Pa.;
- The National Bicentennial Medal received from American Bicentennial Administration Administrator John Warner (future United States Senator), 1976. Neas was chief legislative assistant to ABA Board Co-chairman Senator Edward W. Brooke and Senate liaison to the American Bicentennial Administration);
- "President's Award for Outstanding Service", Leadership Conference on Civil Rights, September, 2007.
- Received the "Eagle Fly Free Award" from the Institute for the Advancement of Multicultural and Minority Medicine (along with Senator Arlen Specter, Congresswoman Debbie Wasserman Schultz, and former world boxing champion Sugar Ray Leonard), September 29, 2009, Institute's Awards Benefit Gala, Washington, D.C.
- Received the "Star for Children" Award from the Children's Charities Foundation, Washington, D.C., December, 2015

Neas was named in 2004 one of Vanity Fair magazine's "Best Stewards of the Environment." In May 2008, the national Legal Times designated Neas one of the 30 "Champions of the Law" over the past three decades.

In addition, Neas was named one of the nation's most influential advocates by the National Journal ("150 Americans Who Make a Difference", June, 1986), Regardie's Magazine (1990), and U.S. News & World Report ("The New American Establishment", February 8, 1988). On October 9, 1987, Neas was named ABC World News' "Person of the Week" for his leadership role opposing the Robert Bork Supreme Court nomination

== Personal life ==
Neas is a baseball fan. As a child, his goal was to play third base for the Boston Red Sox.

In early 1979, Neas received last rites from a Roman Catholic priest after the onset of near-total paralysis which was caused by Guillain–Barré syndrome (also known as "French Polio.") After nearly five months in the hospital, much of it on a respirator in the intensive care unit, he recovered, and co-founded the Guillain Barre Syndrome Foundation, whose primary focus is on families affected by the disease.

Neas married Katherine Beh in 1988, and their daughter Maria was born in 1999.
