= Old Library (Bryn Mawr College) =

- M. Carey Thomas Library, Bryn Mawr College
- U.S. National Register of Historic Places
- U.S. National Historic Landmark
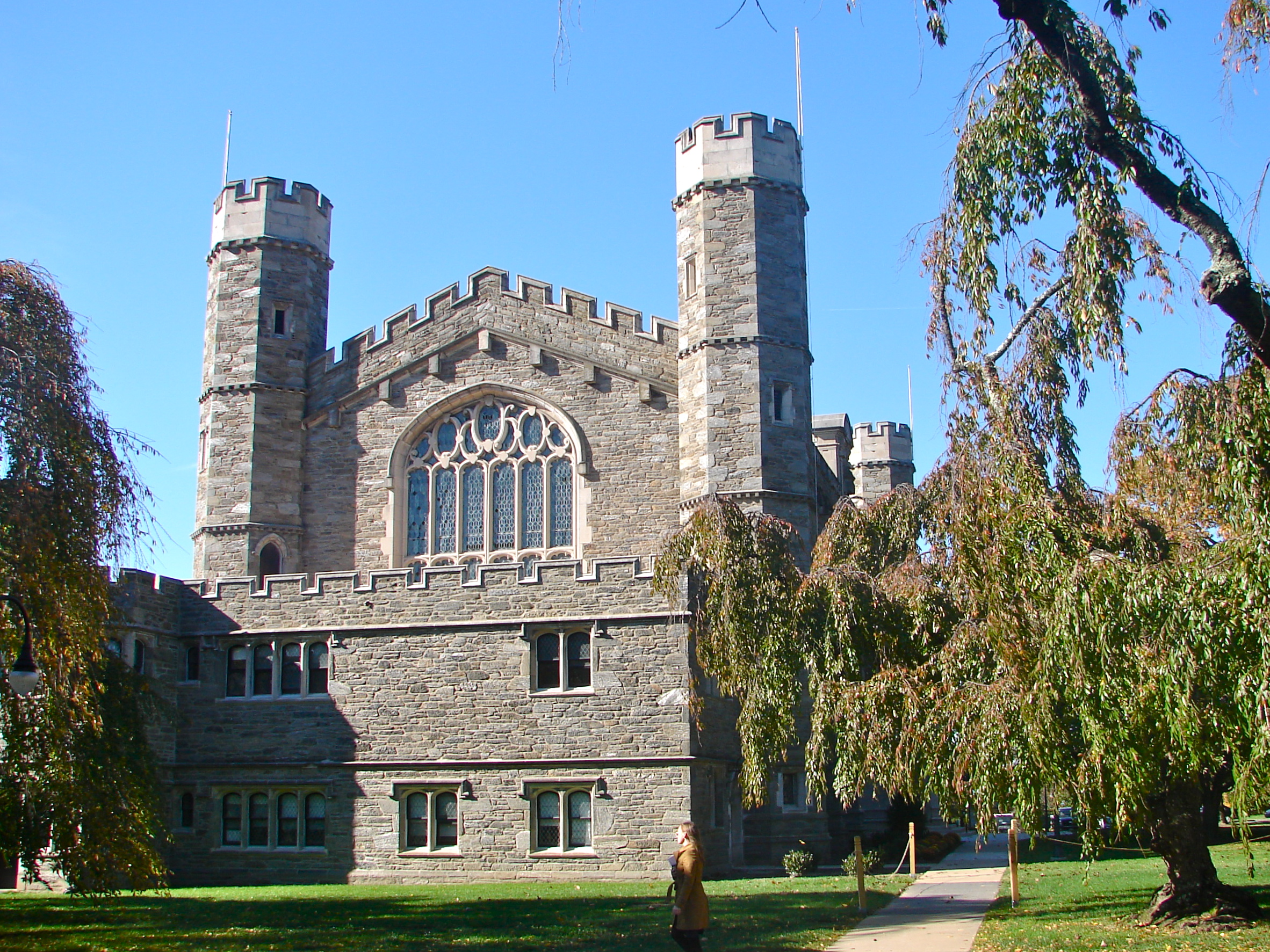

- Location within Pennsylvania Location within the United States
- Location: Bounded by Morris, Yarrow, Wyndon and New Gulph Rds., Bryn Mawr College campus, Bryn Mawr, Pennsylvania
- Coordinates: 40°1′36″N 75°18′52″W
- Built: 1922
- Architect: Walter Cope; John Stewardson
- Architectural style: Late Gothic Revival
- NRHP reference No.: 91002052

Significant dates
- Added to NRHP: July 17, 1991
- Designated NHL: July 17, 1991

The Old Library is a college library at Bryn Mawr College in Bryn Mawr, Pennsylvania. Previously named the M. Carey Thomas Library after Bryn Mawr's first dean and second president, it was formally renamed in 2018 as a result of controversy surrounding Thomas's history of racism and antisemitism. The building was in use as a library until 1970, when the Mariam Coffin Canaday Library opened. Today, it is primarily a space for performances, readings, lectures, and public gatherings.

== History and description ==
The Great Hall, the reading room of the old library, was designed by Walter Cope (of Cope and Stewardson) in 1901 and built by Stewardson and Jamieson in 1907. M. Carey Thomas played a large part in its planning, particularly by taking photographs and doing architectural research on the library's University of Oxford inspirations, and by helping the library's construction survive many hardships, such as Cope's death and financial troubles. Built with ashlar gray stone and lined with coffered oak paneling, the Great Hall was inspired by the dining hall at Wadham College, Oxford and features a king post truss ceiling painted by Lockwood de Forest with geometric renaissance patterns that continue down the wall, ending with tulip-bordered corbels situated between large, arch-shaped lead-paned windows, which flood the space with light. The tracery of the windows is also modeled after Wadham College's dining hall, albeit without Wadham's stained glass. This area was renovated and conserved by Voith & Mactavish Architects LLP. Carey Thomas asked Cope specifically not to "copy the interior plan at any other college, as it was a plan worked out by us at Bryn Mawr for us own individual needs and so far as he and I knew absolutely unique."

The Great Hall was once the home of an Athena Lemnia statue (damaged in 1997) that is now located in a high alcove in the Rhys Carpenter Art and Archaeology Library. A plaster cast of that Athena now stands in her place at the Great Hall.

The library encloses a large open courtyard called "The Cloisters", which is the site of the College's traditional Lantern Night ceremony. The cremated remains of M. Carey Thomas and Emmy Noether are in the courtyard cloister. According to her 1985 graduation address, alumna Katharine Hepburn used to go skinny dipping in the Cloisters' fountain. A popular tradition is for undergraduates to skinny dip before graduating, and conveniently the fountain contains chlorinated water.

The building was declared a National Historic Landmark in 1991.

In 2017, the College established a working group to address M. Carey Thomas's legacy of racism and antisemitism and began phasing out the use of her name. The following year, the Board of Trustees formalized the decision to use the names "The Old Library" and "The Great Hall" in connection with the building. A set of signs contextualizing Thomas and the renaming of the building were installed by the Bryn Mawr Histories Group in 2019.

== Gallery ==
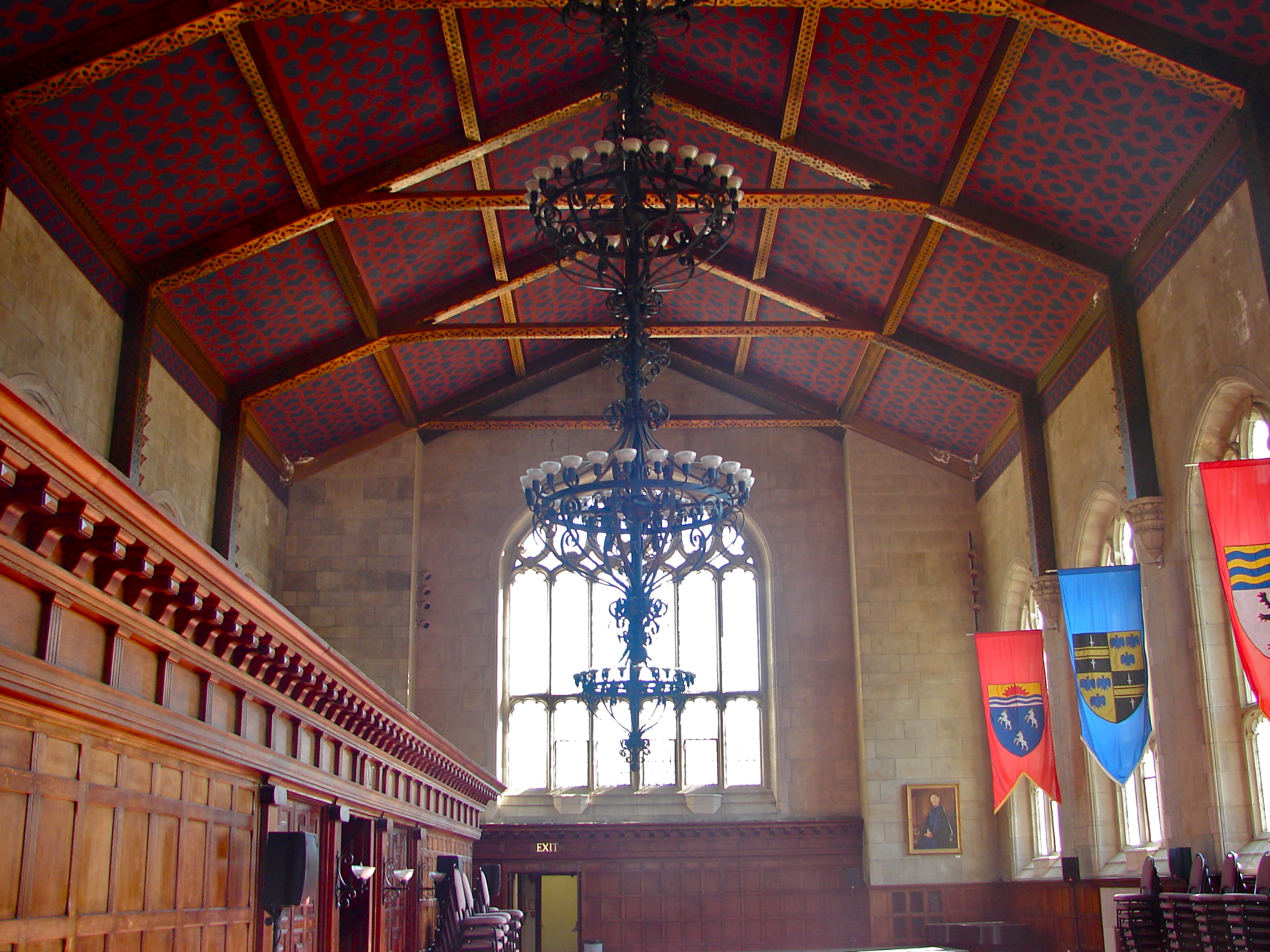
Great Hall

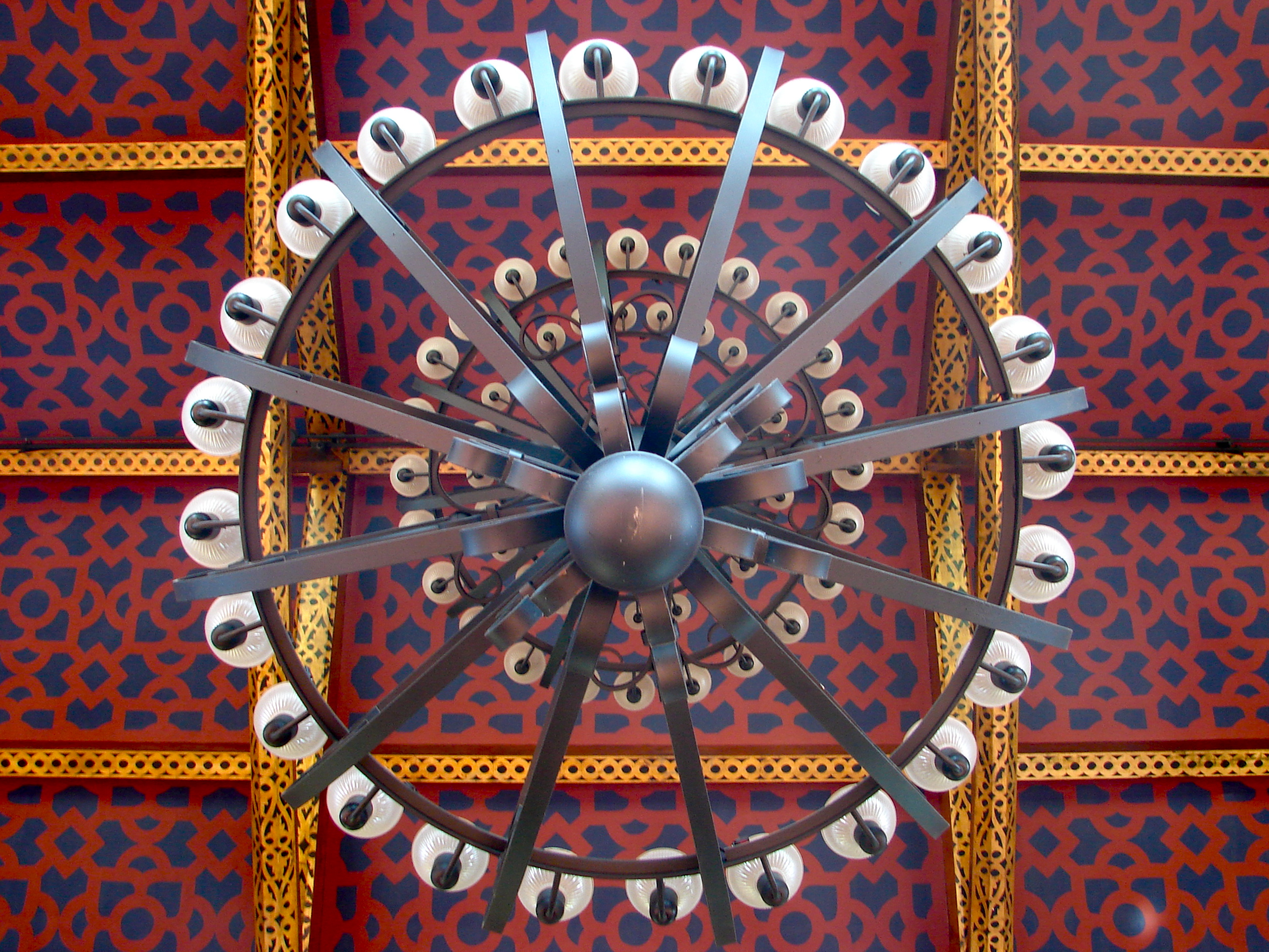
Ceiling in the Great Hall

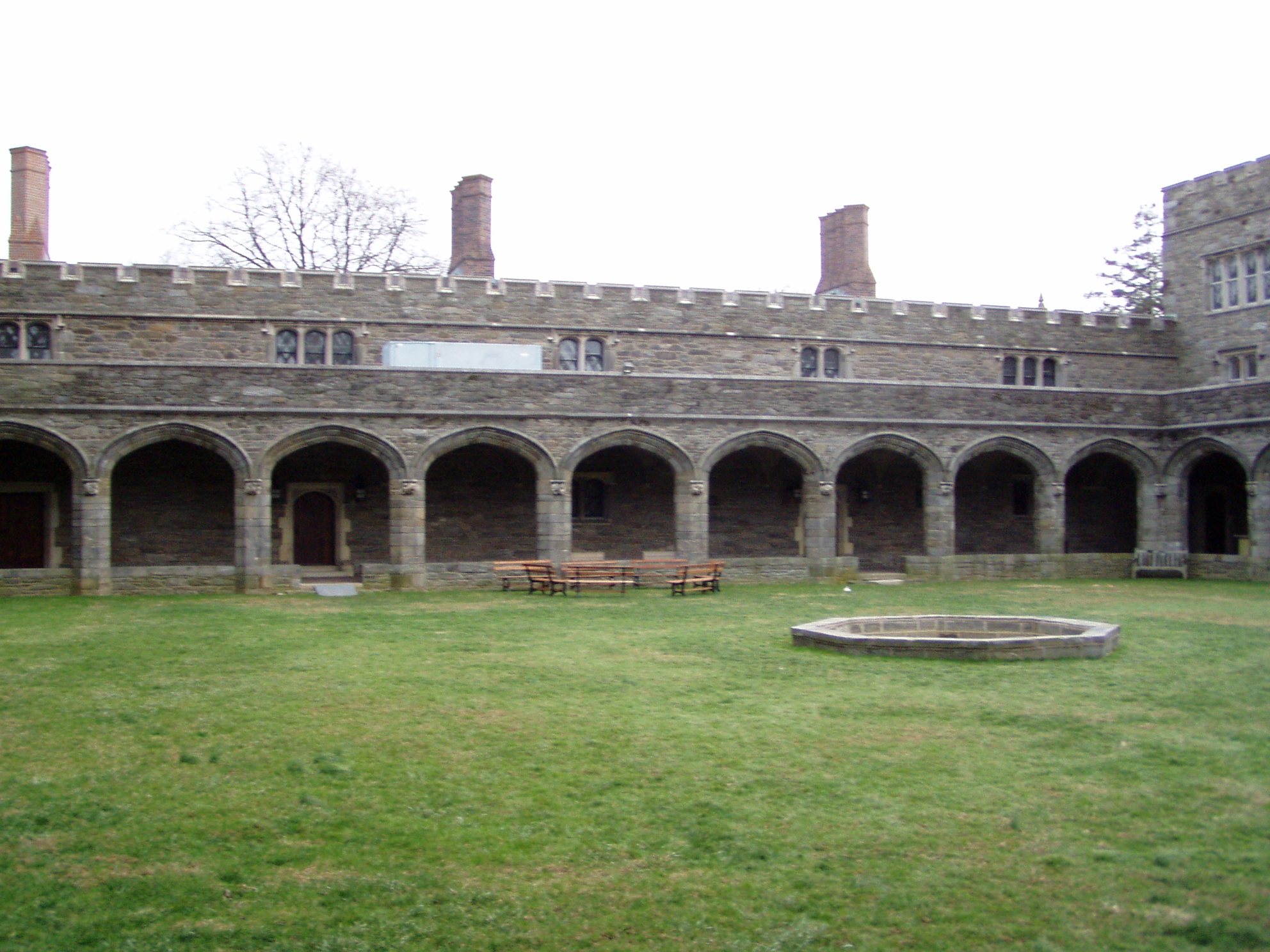
Cloisters
