= Daniela Holt Voith =

American architect

Daniela Holt Voith is an American architect, and the Founding Partner and Director of Design at Voith & Mactavish Architects, LLP, an architecture studio with offices in Philadelphia and New York. She is a Fellow of the American Institute of Architects (FAIA). She has worked extensively providing planning and design services with schools and universities including the University of Pennsylvania Carey Law School, Yale University, and Lehigh University, and boarding schools such as Millbrook School, The Lawrenceville School, and St. Andrew's School, where the film Dead Poets Society was shot. The firm's major projects also include preserving, rehabilitating, and additions to National Historic Landmarks such as the Mercer Museum, Bryn Mawr Film Institute, Old Library at Bryn Mawr College, and the former Centennial National Bank, now the alumni center for Drexel University.

As of 2025, she is the President of the Philadelphia Chapter of the Institute for Classical Architecture and Art. She sits on the board of the Design Leadership Foundation and is a director of the Carpenter's Company of Philadelphia.

== Early life ==
Voith was born in Philadelphia in 1954 to Tatiana Margarita Holt and Anatol Wolf Holt. Her mother was a chemist while her father was a linguist and mathematician who contributed to the development of generalized programming. Her paternal grandmother was a dancer and art historian Claire Holt; a world expert on Indonesian Art and Dance.

Voith earned a Bachelor of Arts from Bryn Mawr College in 1976 and a Master of Architecture from Yale University School of Architecture in 1981. She served as the basketball captain of Yale's Architects team in the graduate school league for three years, where she was the only female member.

Early role models were her grandmother, Claire Holt, architect Anne Tyng, and Barbara Miller Lane. Later she studied with Charles Moore, Caesar Pelli and Marc Simon, all of whom had an effect on her philosophical and design position in her career.

== Personal life ==
Daniela is married to economist Richard Patrick Voith, Chairman of Econsultsolutions Inc., who is a fellow at the University of Pennsylvania's Institute of Urban Research and adjunct faculty at Wharton. She has one daughter, Nina Voith, who is Associate & Associate Director of Interior Design at VMA.

== Career ==
From 1985 to 1988, she was principal at Atkin, Voith & Associates alongside Tony Atkin. The firm won acclaim for the chapel for the Cathedral of Christ the King in Hamilton, Ontario, which was awarded a Progressive Architecture award in 1983, as well as the Renfrew Center which was cited in Progressive Architecture in 1985. Other notable projects included a shortlisted masterplan for the Brooklyn Museum competition, as well as a publication and exhibition designed for Red Grooms at the Pennsylvania Academy of Fine Arts.

In 1988, she founded Voith & Mactavish Architects, LLP with Cameron Mactavish. Her primary focus at VMA, which was cited in her FAIA recognition, has been the planning and design of educational institutions. She is currently the practice's Founding Partner and Director of Design.

In 1998, the firm was the subject of a retrospective at the Cantor Fitzgerald Gallery, Haverford College, for VMA’s 10th anniversary. In 2009, the firm’s work was exhibited at the Athenaeum of Philadelphia to celebrate their 20th anniversary.

In 2008, she was appointed to Philadelphia's Zoning Code Commission by Mayor Michael Nutter to renew the city’s 50-year-old code. As part of the executive committee tasked with rewriting the zoning code, Voith was responsible for including sustainability initiatives in the code, and Transit Oriented Development parking reductions.

VMA announced three new partners in 2024 to join Daniela Holt Voith, Founding Partner, and John H. Cluver, now Senior Partner, to form an expanded leadership: Sennah L. Loftus, Director of Interior Design; Robert A. Douglass, Director of Sustainability; and J. Scott O’Barr, Director of Residential Design.

In 2026, VMA received the Arthur Ross Award in Architecture from the Institute of Classical Architecture & Art. Their rehabilitation of Cresson Hall at Lincoln University received recognition from Preservation Pennsylvania and the Preservation Alliance for Greater Philadelphia. The firm's work on the Alan Horwitz "Sixth Man" Center for Philadelphia Youth Basketball received a Public Impact award from Preservation Pennsylvania.

== Educator ==
Voith has been a faculty member at Bryn Mawr College since 1983, and is currently a senior lecturer in their Growth and Structure of Cities Department. She has also taught at Yale University, Drexel University, and the University of Pennsylvania. She also frequently serves on academic reviews and juries for professional awards in architectural design and construction qualities.

== Notable projects ==
- Pulling House, Millbrook, NY.
- Anthony House, Millbrook, NY.
- The Grange at Fairfield Farm, Lakeville, CT.
- St. George’s School Campus Planning and Design, Middletown, RI.
- Kenneth K.T. Yen Humanities Building, Pennington, NJ.
- Sipprelle Field House, St. Andrew’s School, Middletown, DE.
- Lehigh College of Business Building, Lehigh University, Bethlehem, PA.
- Dwight Hall Renovation, Yale University, New Haven, CT.
- Carey Law School Renovation, University of Pennsylvania, Philadelphia, PA. Original design of Silverman Hall by Cope and Stewardson.
- Lebow College of Business, Drexel University, Philadelphia, PA.
- Noyes Hall Restoration, Vassar College, Poughkeepsie, NY. Original design by Eero Saarinen.
- Renovation of the Old Library at Bryn Mawr College, Bryn Mawr, Pennsylvania. Original design by Cope and Stewardson.
- Christ Church Neighborhood House, Philadelphia, PA.
- Mercer Museum Addition, Doylestown, PA.
- Church Farm School Modernization, Chester County, PA.
- Renovation of Abbott Dining Hall at Lawrenceville School, Mercer County, NJ.
- Cresson Hall at Lincoln University, Lower Oxford Township, PA
- Alan Horwitz “Sixth Man” Center for Philadelphia Youth Basketball, Philadelphia, PA

== Recognition and appointments ==
Voith has received multiple awards and honors for her achievements in and contributions to the advancement of architecture, some of which include:

In 1994, she served as President of American Institute of Architects' Philadelphia Chapter.

In 1998, the firm was the subject of a retrospective at the Cantor Fitzgerald Gallery, Haverford College, for VMA’s 10th anniversary.

In 2008, she was appointed to Philadelphia's Zoning Code Commission by Mayor Michael Nutter.

In 2009, the firm’s work was exhibited at the Athenaeum of Philadelphia to celebrate their 20th anniversary.

In 2014, she was named a Fellow of the American Institute of Architects.

In 2014, her firm was the subject of a retrospective at Haverford College.

In 2019, she was appointed to the board of the Philadelphia Chapter of the Institute for Classical Architecture and Art where she currently serves as president.
