= Amita Gupta =

American physician scientist

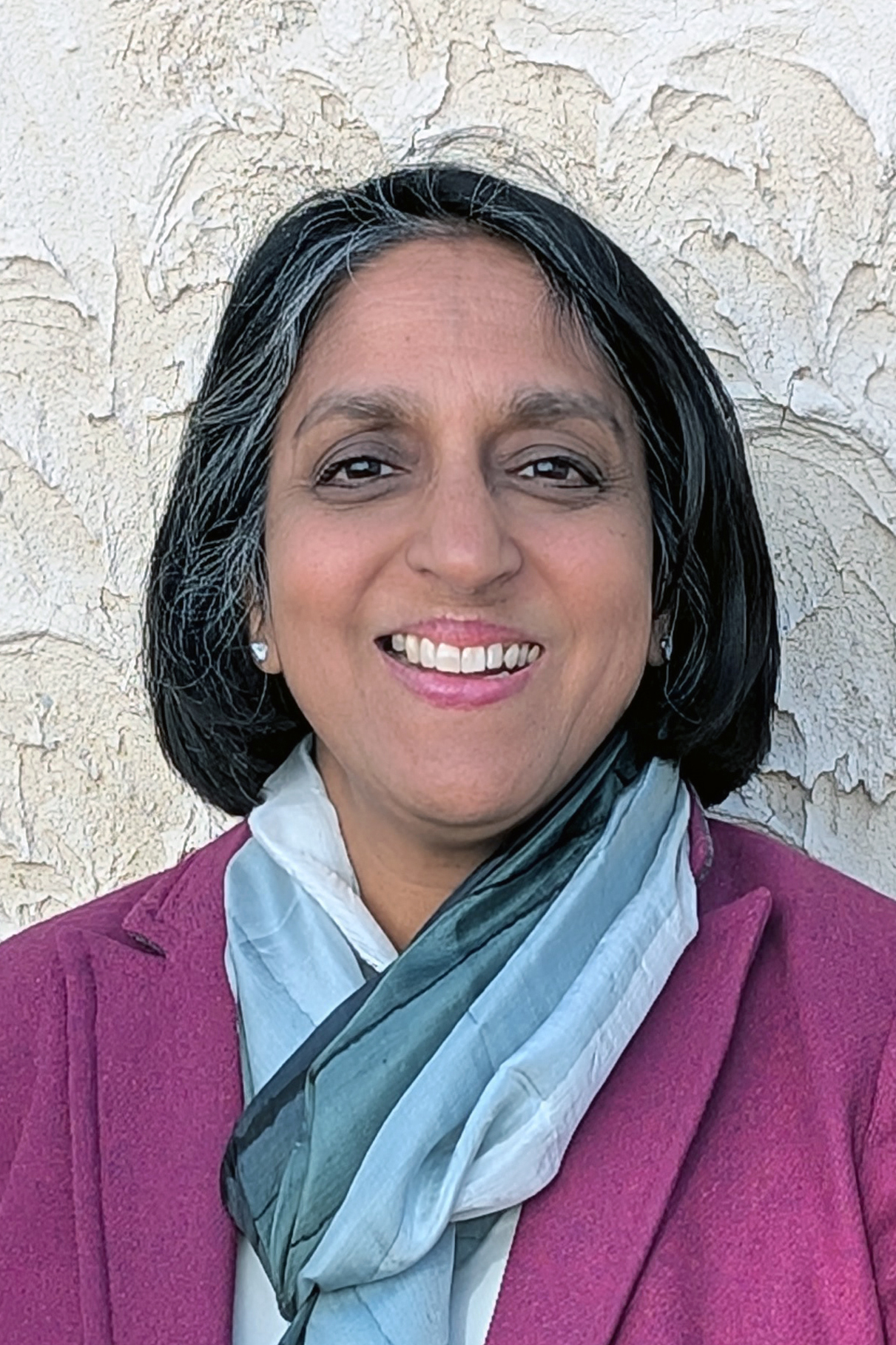
- Gupta in 2026
- Education: Harvard Medical School
- Occupations: Physician scientist; Director of Division of Infectious Diseases at Johns Hopkins
- Employer: Johns Hopkins University
- Known for: Public health research especially tuberculosis

Amita Gupta is an American physician-scientist who serves as Director (Chief) of the Division of Infectious Diseases in the Department of Medicine at the Johns Hopkins University School of Medicine. She is the Florence Sabin Professor of Medicine at Johns Hopkins and holds a joint faculty appointment at the Johns Hopkins Bloomberg School of Public Health.

== Early life and education ==
Gupta is the child of Rajiv L. Gupta and Kamla Gupta, who immigrated to the U.S. from India in 1968.

Gupta graduated from Massachusetts Institute of Technology in material science engineering in 1991 and received an MD from Harvard Medical School in 1997. She completed residency training in internal medicine and primary care at the University of California, San Francisco—San Francisco General Hospital in 2000. Following her residency, Gupta joined the Epidemic Intelligence Service at the U.S. Centers for Disease Control and Prevention, in the Foodborne and Diarrheal Diseases Branch (Atlanta, Georgia). In 2005, she completed a post-doctoral fellowship training in infectious diseases at Johns Hopkins University School of Medicine, and she earned a master's degree in health science and clinical investigation from the Johns Hopkins Bloomberg School of public health in 2006.

== Career and research ==
Her research focuses on tuberculosis (TB), HIV, and infectious diseases in understudied populations (including pregnant and postpartum women, infants, children, and adolescents), with extensive collaborative work in India; she has led multinational clinical trials and international consortia in TB prevention and treatment, biomarker discovery, and implementation science.

Gupta is an author of more than 300 research publications on the prevention, diagnosis, treatment, of infectious diseases and factors that complicate disease treatment and management.

In a bibliometric analysis published in 2023 of scientific publications addressing perinatal complications in pregnant women who have tuberculosis, Gupta was found to have the most published papers (13 publications), and her papers were the most cited (116 citations).
