= National Partnership for Women & Families =

National Partnership for Women & Families Logo

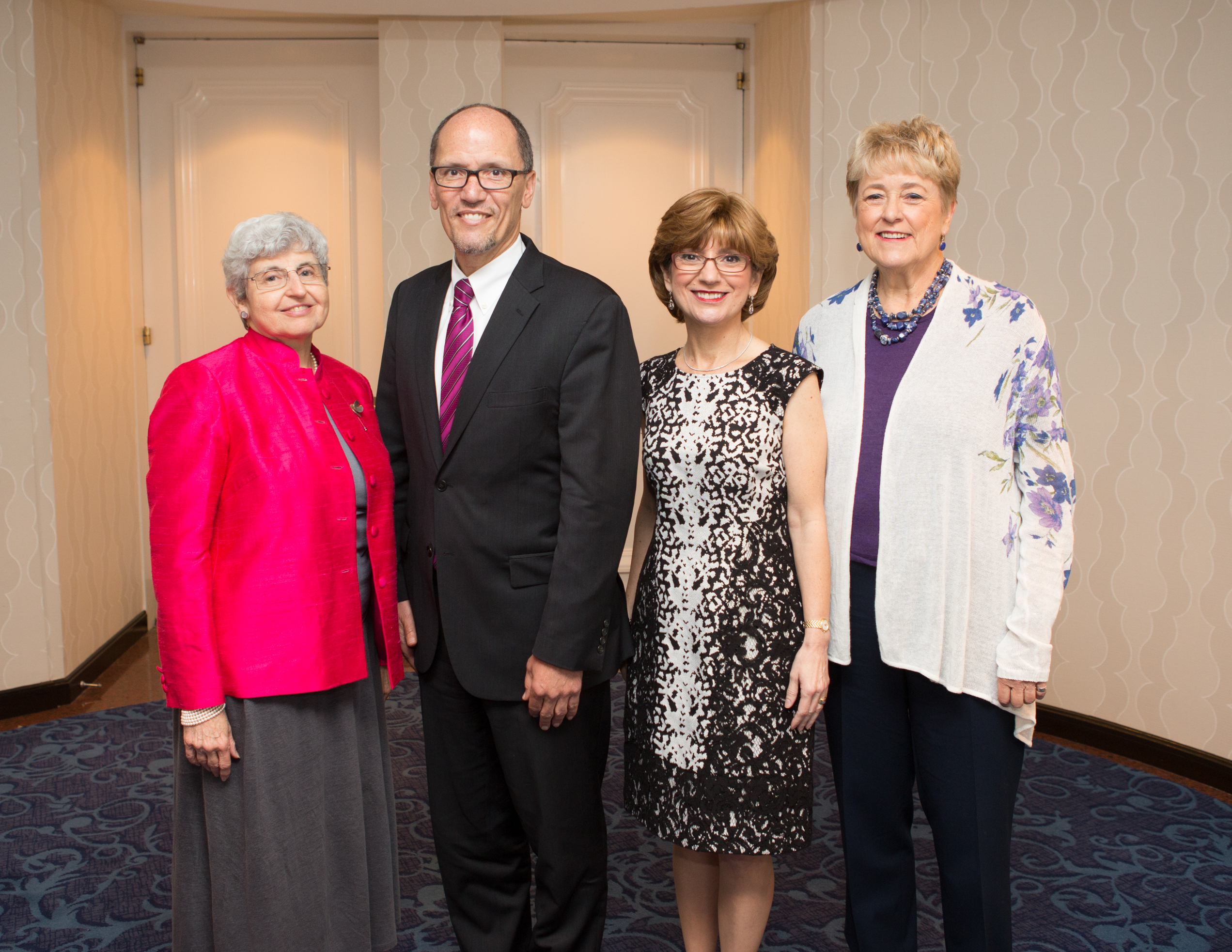
Judith L. Lichtman, Thomas Perez, Debra L. Ness and Ellen Malcolm, 2015

The National Partnership for Women & Families is a nonprofit, nonpartisan 501(c)(3) organization based in Washington, D.C. Founded in 1971, the National Partnership works on public policies, education and outreach that focuses on women and families.

== History ==
The National Partnership for Women & Families (NPWF) was known as the Women's Legal Defense Fund (WLDF) until 1998.

Judith L. Lichtman was hired as the National Partnership's first paid staff member in 1974. Lichtman became president in 1988 and served in the role for 16 years. Lichtman is currently the organization's senior advisor.

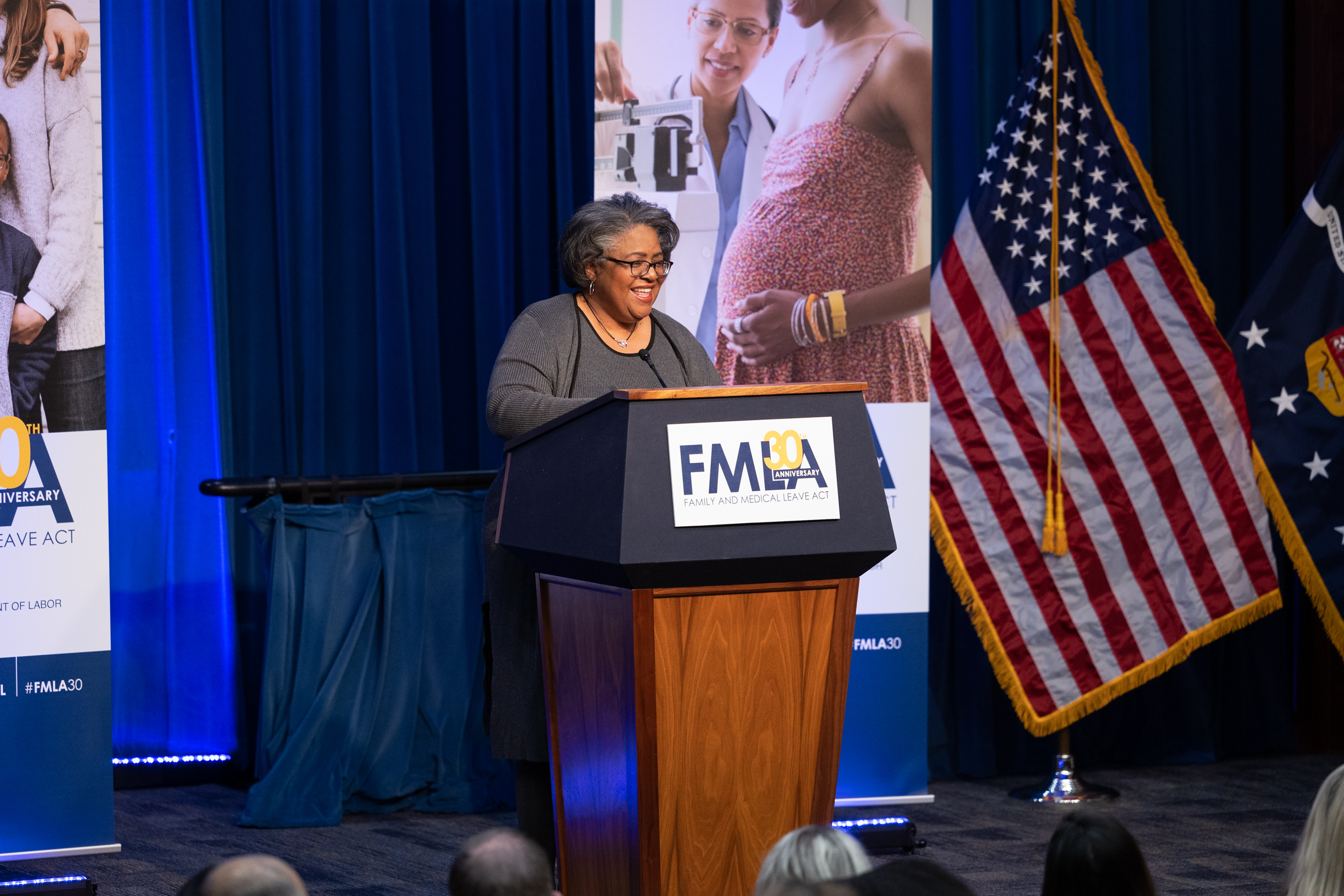
NPWF President Jocelyn Frye addresses The Celebration of 30 Years of the Family and Medical Leave Act at the US Department of Labor, 2023

The organization's current president, Jocelyn C. Frye, assumed her position in December 2021. She previously served as an attorney focusing on issues around discrimination and gender inequality. Frye was also director of policy and special projects under the First Lady Michelle Obama. Frye took over for former NPWF President, Debra L. Ness.

The organization is known for its work to shape, pass, protect and help expand the Family and Medical Leave Act – the first and only national law guaranteeing eligible workers job-protected, unpaid leave to care for a newborn or newly adopted child, seriously ill family member, or to recover from their own serious health conditions.

== Impact and achievements ==
In 1977, the National Partnership litigated and achieved a significant victory in Barnes v. Costle, a U.S. Court of Appeals decision that held that any retaliation by a boss against an employee for rejecting sexual advances violates Title VII's prohibition against sex discrimination.

Laws the National Partnership helped enact include: the Pregnancy Discrimination Act of 1978, the Civil Rights Act of 1991, the Family and Medical Leave Act of 1993 and the Health Insurance Portability and Accountability Act of 1996, as well as national child support reforms in 1988.

In 2009, the National Partnership helped lead efforts to create the Lilly Ledbetter Fair Pay Act of 2009 and the Children's Health Insurance Program Reauthorization Act of 2009. The foundation also worked on reversing the global gag rule, and adding clauses to the American Recovery and Reinvestment Act of 2009.

The National Partnership provided technical assistance and expert testimony in support of the 2010 Patient Protection and Affordable Care Act.

The National Partnership also works on city and state level campaigns and has driven or supported efforts to enact paid sick days laws in San Francisco (2006), the District of Columbia (2008) and the state of Connecticut (2011), as well as paid family leave laws in the states of California (2002), Washington (2007) and New Jersey (2008).

In 2011, the organization won the Convio Innovator Award for Best Online Campaign.

In 2022, the organization helped championed passage of the Pregnant Workers Fairness Act (PWFA), a federal law meant to eliminate discrimination and ensure workplace accommodations for workers with known limitations related to pregnancy, childbirth, or a related medical condition. On December 29, 2022 President Joe Biden signed the PWFA into law.

== Notable Supporters ==
First Lady Michelle Obama is a two-time speaker at National Partnership events. In 2011, she said that the National Partnership is "one of the most influential organizations for women and families in our country," and has had an "amazing imprint on nearly every single one of this nation's major policy achievements for women and families."

Secretary of State and former First Lady Hillary Clinton has been twice honored by the National Partnership, in 1994 and 2012. In 2012 she said of the National Partnership, "For more than 40 years, you've been protecting the most vulnerable among us and holding us all to account when we are not living up to our own American values. And in the process, you improve the lives of countless women and help make that future a better place for them and their children."
