= Maya Wiley =

American lawyer and mayoral candidate (born 1964)

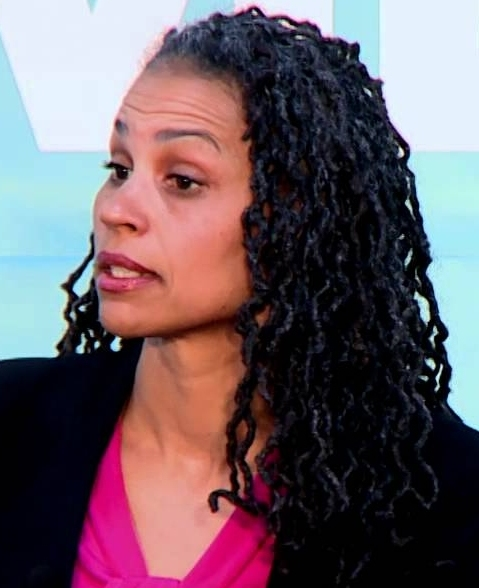
- Wiley in 2015

President and CEO of the Leadership Conference on Civil and Human Rights
- Incumbent
- Assumed office May 2, 2022
- Preceded by: Wade Henderson

Chair of the New York City Civilian Complaint Review Board
- In office July 2016 – August 2017
- Preceded by: Richard Emery
- Succeeded by: Frederick Davie

Personal details
- Born: January 2, 1964 (age 62) Syracuse, New York, U.S.
- Party: Democratic
- Spouse: Harlan Mandel
- Children: 2
- Relatives: George Wiley (father)
- Education: Dartmouth College (BA); Columbia University (JD)

Maya D. Wiley (born January 2, 1964) is an American lawyer, professor, and civil rights activist. She has served as president and CEO of the Leadership Conference on Civil and Human Rights since May 2022. Wiley served as counsel to New York City Mayor Bill de Blasio. She chaired the Civilian Complaint Review Board (CCRB) from 2016 to 2017. She was an MSNBC legal analyst from August 2018 to January 2021. Wiley ran in the 2021 New York City Democratic mayoral primary, placing third.

Wiley is the senior vice president for social justice at The New School and a professor at the Milano School of Policy, Management, and Environment.

== Early life and education ==
Wiley was born on January 2, 1964, in Syracuse, New York, and raised in Washington, D.C. Her father was a Black civil rights leader, chemist and academic George Wiley. Her mother, Wretha Frances (Whittle) Wiley, was White, and inspired her to focus on progressive issues. On August 8, 1973, Wiley's 42-year-old father fell overboard while sailing with Wiley and her older brother on his 23‐foot boat on Chesapeake Bay, Maryland. On August 12, 1973, his body was found floating in the bay off the shore of Chesapeake Beach, Maryland, after a three-day search.

Wiley earned a Bachelor of Arts degree in psychology from Dartmouth College in 1986 and a Juris Doctor from Columbia Law School.

== Career ==
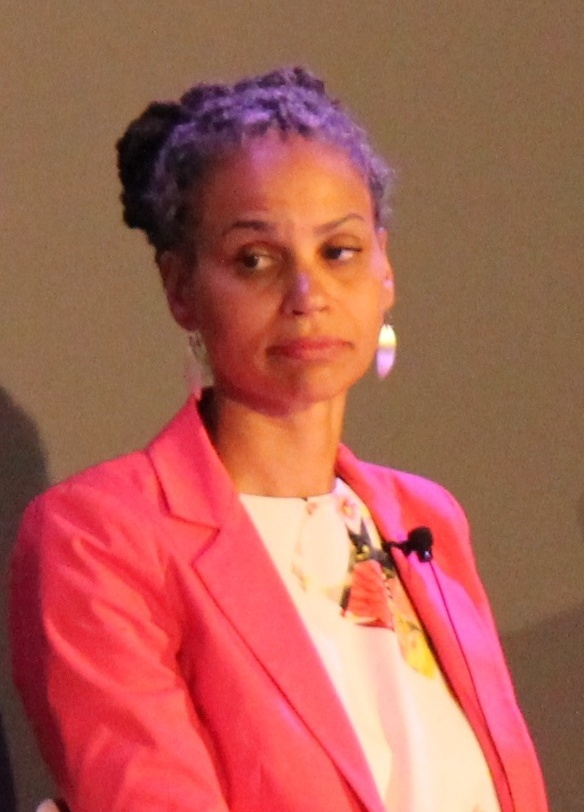
Wiley in 2015

Wiley served in the Civil Division of the U.S. Attorney Office for the Southern District of New York.

In 2013, Wiley was mentioned as a potential president of the NAACP, but the post went instead to Cornell William Brooks. Before being appointed counsel to Mayor Bill de Blasio in 2014, she worked for the NAACP Legal Defense and Educational Fund, the American Civil Liberties Union and the Open Society Institute.

Wiley spent two and a half years as counsel to de Blasio, during which time she became known for coining the term "agents of the city" in an attempt to prevent public disclosure of de Blasio's communications with lobbyists. She also founded and served as president of the Center for Social Inclusion, a national policy strategy organization dedicated to dismantling structural racism.

Wiley has taught at The New School, where she founded the Digital Equity Laboratory, and appeared on MSNBC as a political and legal analyst.

In November 2023, Wiley was named the District of Columbia School of Law Foundation's Joseph L. Rauh Jr. Chair of Civil and Human Rights.

=== 2021 New York City mayoral campaign ===
Wiley ran in the Democratic primary for mayor of New York City in 2021. In June 2021, Wiley was endorsed by U.S. Representative Alexandria Ocasio-Cortez, and former presidential candidates Julian Castro and Elizabeth Warren, as well as Local 1199 of the Service Employees International Union, the largest union in New York City. She was also endorsed by The Strokes, whose song "Starting Again" was included in a campaign advertisement. The band also played a fundraising concert at Irving Plaza on June 12, 2021. Wiley placed third in the Democratic primary, behind Eric Adams (who was later elected in the general election) and Kathryn Garcia.

=== Leadership Conference on Civil and Human Rights ===
In March 2022, the Leadership Conference on Civil and Human Rights announced Wiley's appointment as its president and CEO, and of its sister group, The Leadership Conference Education Fund, effective May 2. In 2023, she represented the Leadership Conference at a meeting hosted by Vice President Kamala Harris with labor and rights groups to discuss threats from artificial intelligence (AI), and as a panelist at the U.S. Senate's inaugural AI Insight Forum, hosted by majority leader Chuck Schumer. Wiley also attended White House meetings during the Biden administration, alongside other civil rights leaders, to advocate for stronger voting rights and more economic opportunities for the Black community.

In 2025, she endorsed Zohran Mamdani's campaign for Mayor of New York City in the 2025 mayoral Democratic primary.

== Personal life ==
Wiley is married to Harlan Mandel, CEO of the Media Development Investment Fund. They live in Brooklyn with their two daughters.
