= Rajiv L. Gupta =

American businessman (born 1945)

Raj Gupta
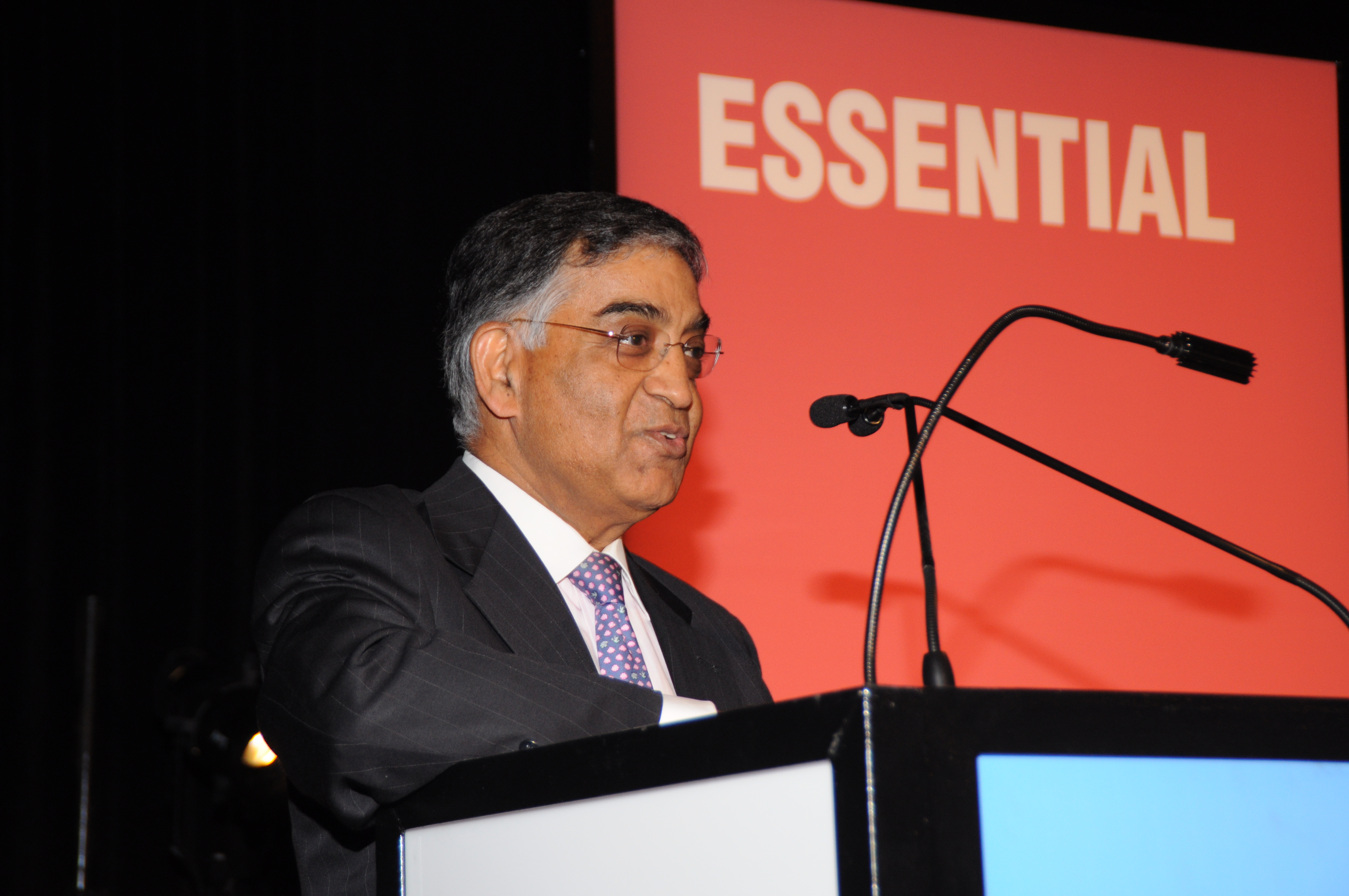
- Born: December 23, 1945 (age 80); Muzaffarnagar, British India
- Education: Indian Institute of Technology, Bombay (BS); Cornell University (MS); Drexel University (MBA)
- Occupations: Chairman, Aptiv
- Known for: Former chairman, CEO, and president of Rohm and Haas
- Children: 2, including Vanita

Rajiv L. Gupta (born December 23, 1945) is an American businessman, the current chairman of Aptiv, an auto parts company, and a former executive with Rohm and Haas, a manufacturer of specialty chemicals.

== Early life ==
Gupta was born on December 23, 1945, in Muzaffarnagar, India, the son of Phool Prakash and Rukmini Sahai.

He graduated in 1967 with a degree in mechanical engineering from Indian Institute of Technology Bombay. Gupta continued his studies going on to earn an M.S. degree in Operations Research in 1969 from Cornell University, and his M.B.A. in Finance from the Bennett S. LeBow College of Business at Drexel University in 1972.

== Career ==
He is the former chairman, CEO, and president of Philadelphia-based Rohm and Haas. In 1971, Gupta joined Rohm and Haas as a financial analyst. Working his way up in the company, Gupta was elected to the board of directors and named vice chairman in January 1999 and later became chairman and chief executive officer in October 1999. He assumed the additional title of president in early 2005. He left Rohm and Haas after its $15.3 billion acquisition by Dow in 2009.

In April 2005, the US Pan Asian American Chamber of Commerce named Gupta as one of the top ten most influential Asian Americans in business. In 2006, Gupta was named Drexel's 53rd Business Leader of the Year. Gupta has also served as the chairman for the American Chemistry Council and the Society of Chemical Industry, America Section.

In 2010, he was chairman of Avantor Performance Material based in Center Valley, Pennsylvania, near Bethlehem.

In February 2015, he became the chairman of Delphi Automotive. Delphi Automotive spun off its powertrain division and aftermarket related businesses (now Delphi Technologies) in December 2017 and changed its name to Aptiv plc.

== Personal life ==
Gupta married Kamla Varshney in 1968, and they have two children, former associate attorney general Vanita Gupta and Amita Gupta, Director of Johns Hopkins Medicine's Division of Infectious Diseases. They lived in Newtown Square, Pennsylvania until Gupta left Rohm and Haas. In 2018, Raj and Kamla Gupta made a gift to the Drexel University LeBow College of Business to establish the Raj & Kamla Gupta Governance Institute.
