= Leadership Conference on Civil and Human Rights =

Umbrella group of American civil rights interest groups

- Formation: 1950; 76 years ago
- Founders: Arnold Aronson; A. Philip Randolph; Roy Wilkins
- Type: 501(c)(4) organization
- Tax ID no.: 52-0789800
- Headquarters: Washington, D.C., United States
- President and CEO: Maya Wiley
- Website: civilrights.org

The Leadership Conference on Civil and Human Rights is an American coalition of more than 240 national civil and human rights organizations and acts as an umbrella group for American civil and human rights. Founded as the Leadership Conference on Civil Rights (LCCR) in 1950 by civil rights activists Arnold Aronson, A. Philip Randolph, and Roy Wilkins, the coalition has focused on issues ranging from educational equity to justice reform to voting rights.

The Leadership Conference is the nation's oldest and largest civil rights coalition; member groups have included the American Civil Liberties Union, the Anti-Defamation League, the NAACP Legal Defense and Educational Fund, Sierra Club, and United Steelworkers. The Leadership Conference has historically focused on bias and hate reduction, census and data equity, educational equity, fair courts, justice reform, technology, and voting rights, among other issues. Positions, policies and decisions are made by the conference by majority consent.

Chairpersons of the coalition have included Wilkins, Bayard Rustin, Benjamin Hooks, Dorothy Height, and Judith L. Lichtman. Senior executives have included Aronson, Ralph Neas, Wade Henderson, Vanita Gupta, and Maya Wiley.

== History ==
=== Leadership Conference on Civil Rights (1950–2000s) ===
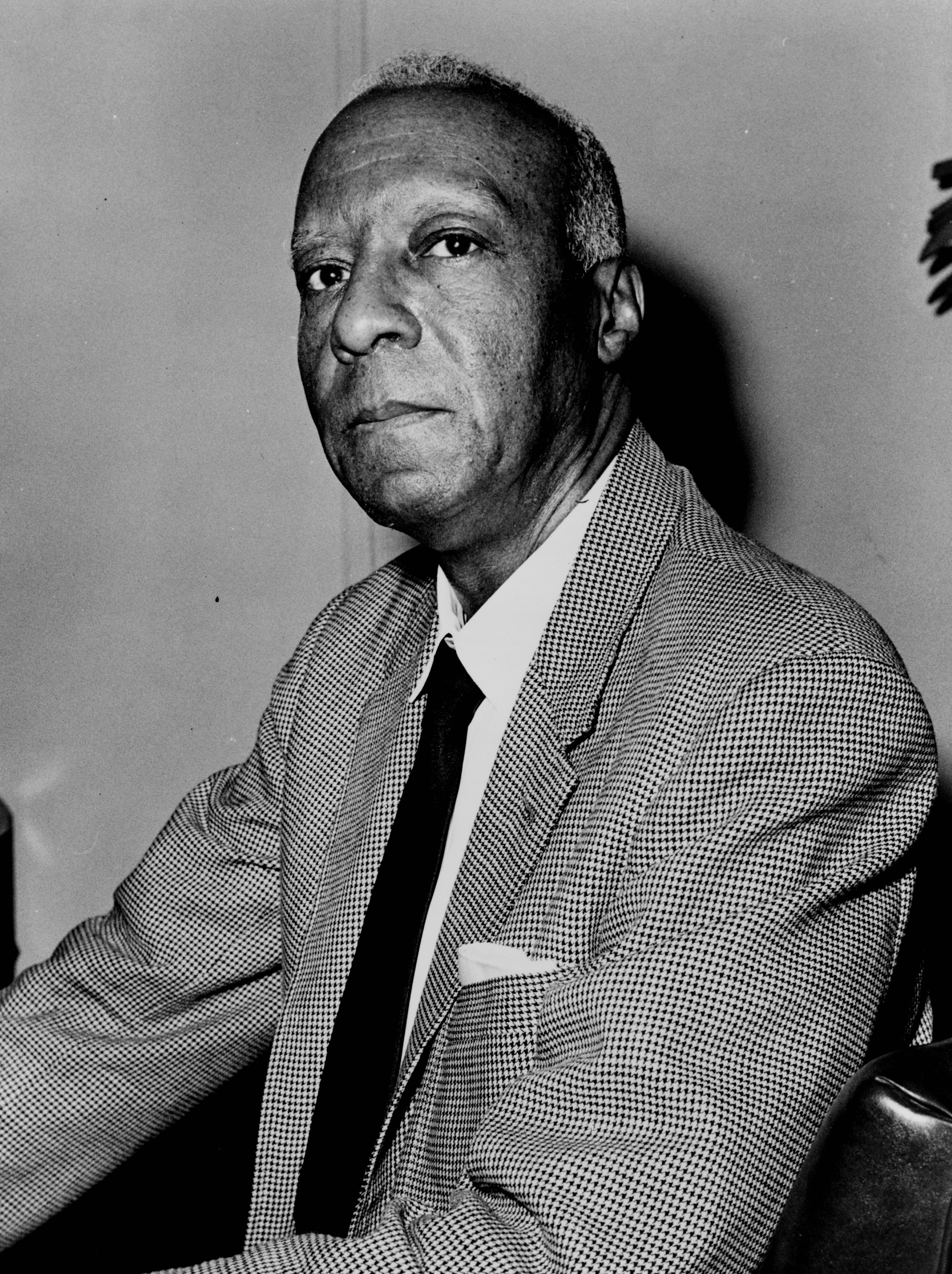
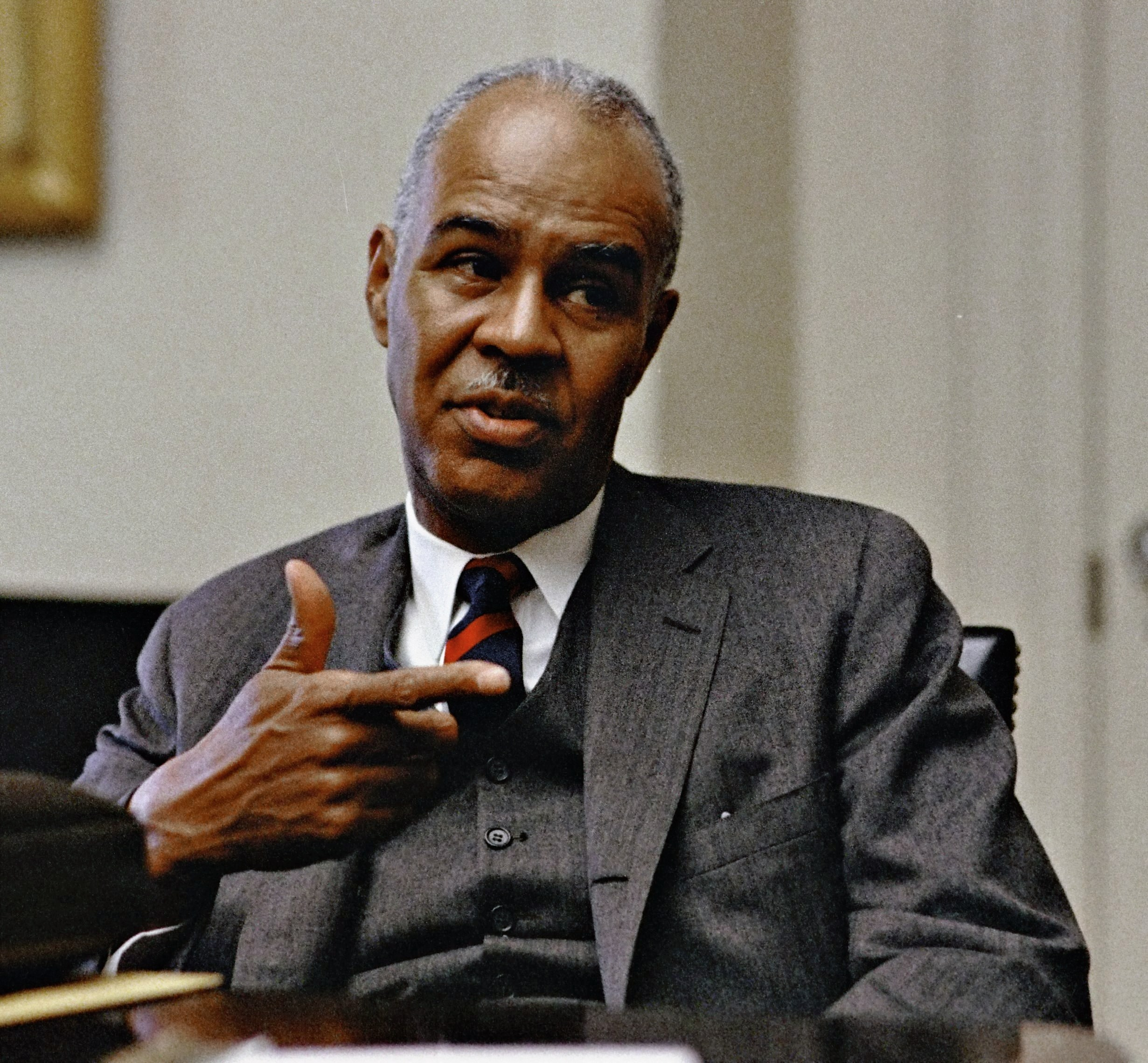
The Leadership Conference on Civil Rights was established by civil rights activists Arnold Aronson, A. Philip Randolph (left), and Roy Wilkins (right).

The Leadership Conference on Civil Rights (LCCR) was established in 1950 by civil rights activists Arnold Aronson, A. Philip Randolph, and Roy Wilkins. According to Harvard International Review, the coalition was created "as the legislative arm" of the civil rights movement. Its formation followed a political demonstration organized in Washington to protest racial injustice. The LCCR initially focused on fair labor practices, and became "an early proponent of affirmative action to redress wrongs done to blacks".

In 1963, the coalition, the NAACP, and the United Auto Workers convened at Manhattan's Roosevelt Hotel to decide how to influence comprehensive civil rights legislation being spearheaded by President John F. Kennedy. From the meeting, the LCCR became an organizing hub for the groups. The coalition has been credited for influencing the U.S. House Committee on the Judiciary to expand the bill by banning employment discrimination based on race. According to the John F. Kennedy Presidential Library and Museum, the Leadership Conference "lobbied for and won the passage of" the Civil Rights Act of 1957, the Civil Rights Act of 1960, the Civil Rights Act of 1964, the Voting Rights Act of 1965, and the Fair Housing Act of 1968, and helped organize the March on Washington for Jobs and Freedom. Randolph was chair of the March on Washington.

The coalition helped establish Martin Luther King Jr. Day as a federal holiday in 1986, and led an effort to reject Robert Bork's nomination to the Supreme Court in 1987. The LCCR also stopped the Ronald Reagan administration from "weakening" an executive order on affirmative action, and was "instrumental" in the Republican-led Senate Committee on the Judiciary's rejection of William Bradford Reynolds' nomination for the role of Associate Attorney General. By the late 1980s, the LCCR was serving as an "umbrella" organization for more than 185 national groups, including those representing the civil, disability, elder, labor, LGBT, religious, and women's rights movements.

During the 1990s, the coalition had approximately 175–180 member organizations, and opposed George H. W. Bush's nomination of Clarence Thomas to the Supreme Court. Following the murders of Matthew Shepard and James Byrd Jr. in the late 1990s, the LCCR worked to enact new statutes against hate crimes and supported the Matthew Shepard and James Byrd Jr. Hate Crimes Prevention Act, which was signed into law by President Barack Obama in 2009. The coalition also advocated for the reauthorization of the Voting Rights Act in 2006, the Lilly Ledbetter Fair Pay Act of 2009, and the Fair Sentencing Act, which was signed into federal law by President Obama in 2010.

=== Leadership Conference on Civil and Human Rights (2010–present) ===
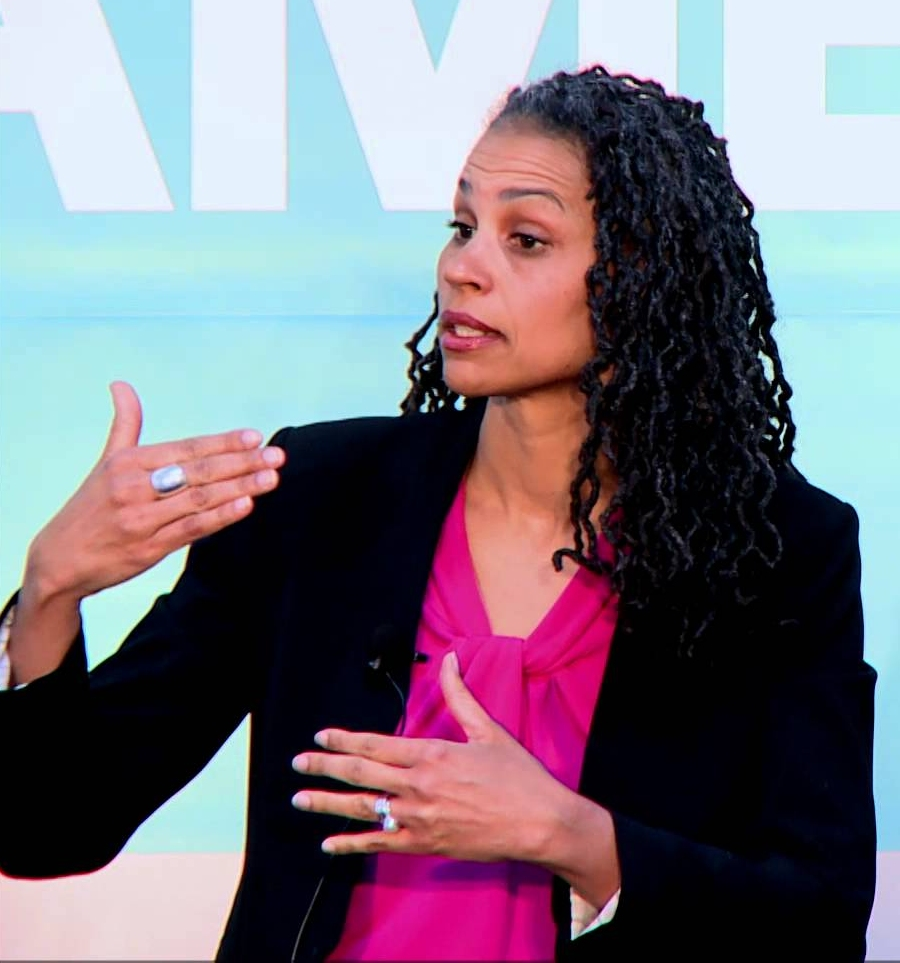
Maya Wiley (pictured in 2015) became the coalition's president and chief executive officer in 2022.

The coalition's name was formally expanded to include human rights in 2010. By 2012, approximately 200 member organizations had joined the Leadership Conference and tasked the coalition with promoting and protecting the civil and human rights of all people in the U.S.

The Leadership Conference supported the appointments of Sonia Sotomayor, Elena Kagan, and Ketanji Brown Jackson to the Supreme Court. Wade Henderson, the coalition's president and chief executive officer (CEO), testified in support of Sotomayor and Jackson before the Senate Committee on the Judiciary. During the first presidency of Donald Trump, the Leadership Conference served as a "strategic hub of the resistance" and as the "nerve center" for defending civil rights. The coalition's Center for Civil Rights and Technology, which focuses on artificial intelligence (AI) policy and its impact on civil and human rights, launched in 2023. The center monitors AI-related legislation and regulations, publishes papers, and hosts an advisory group of experts and civil rights organizations.

== Leadership ==
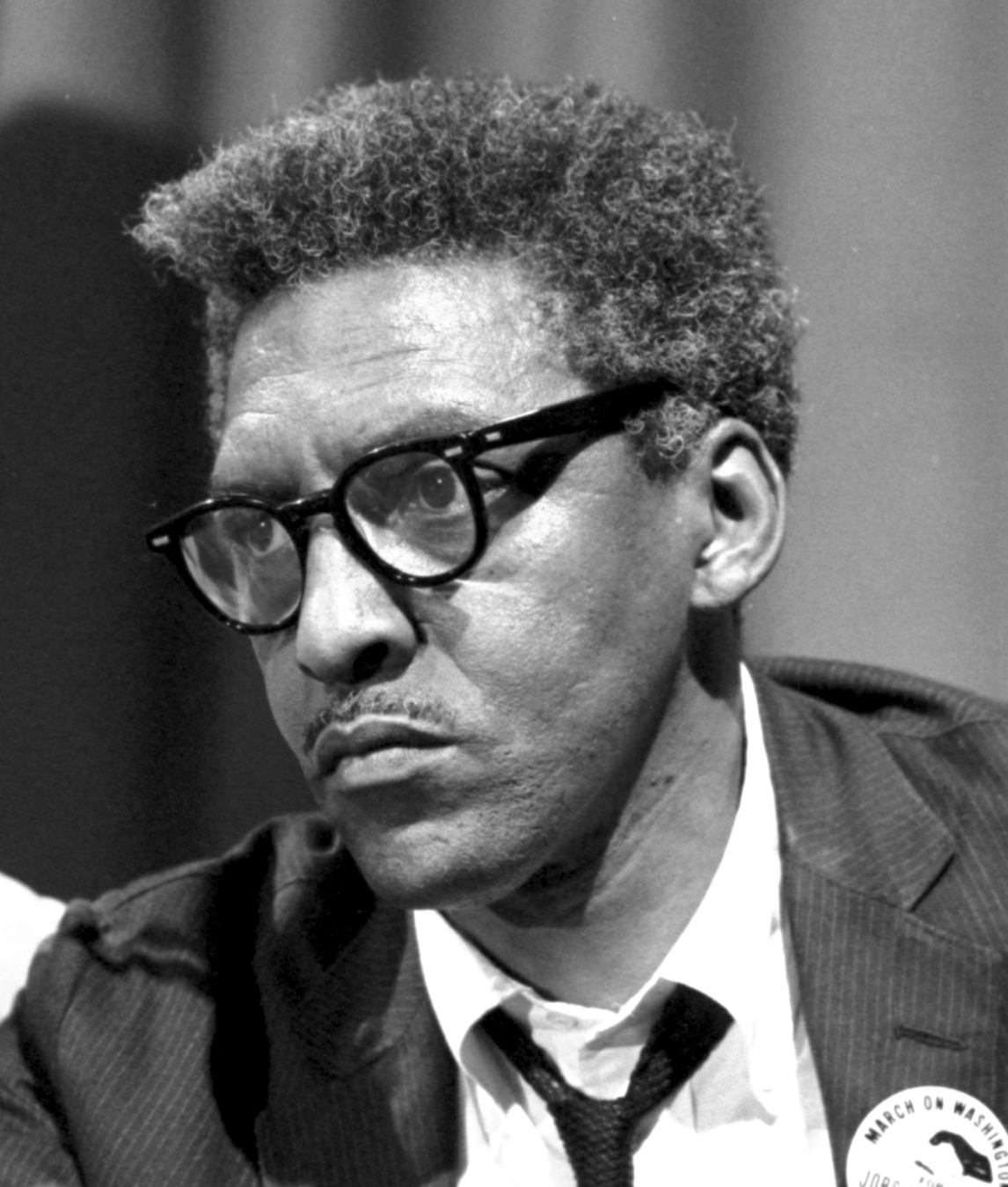
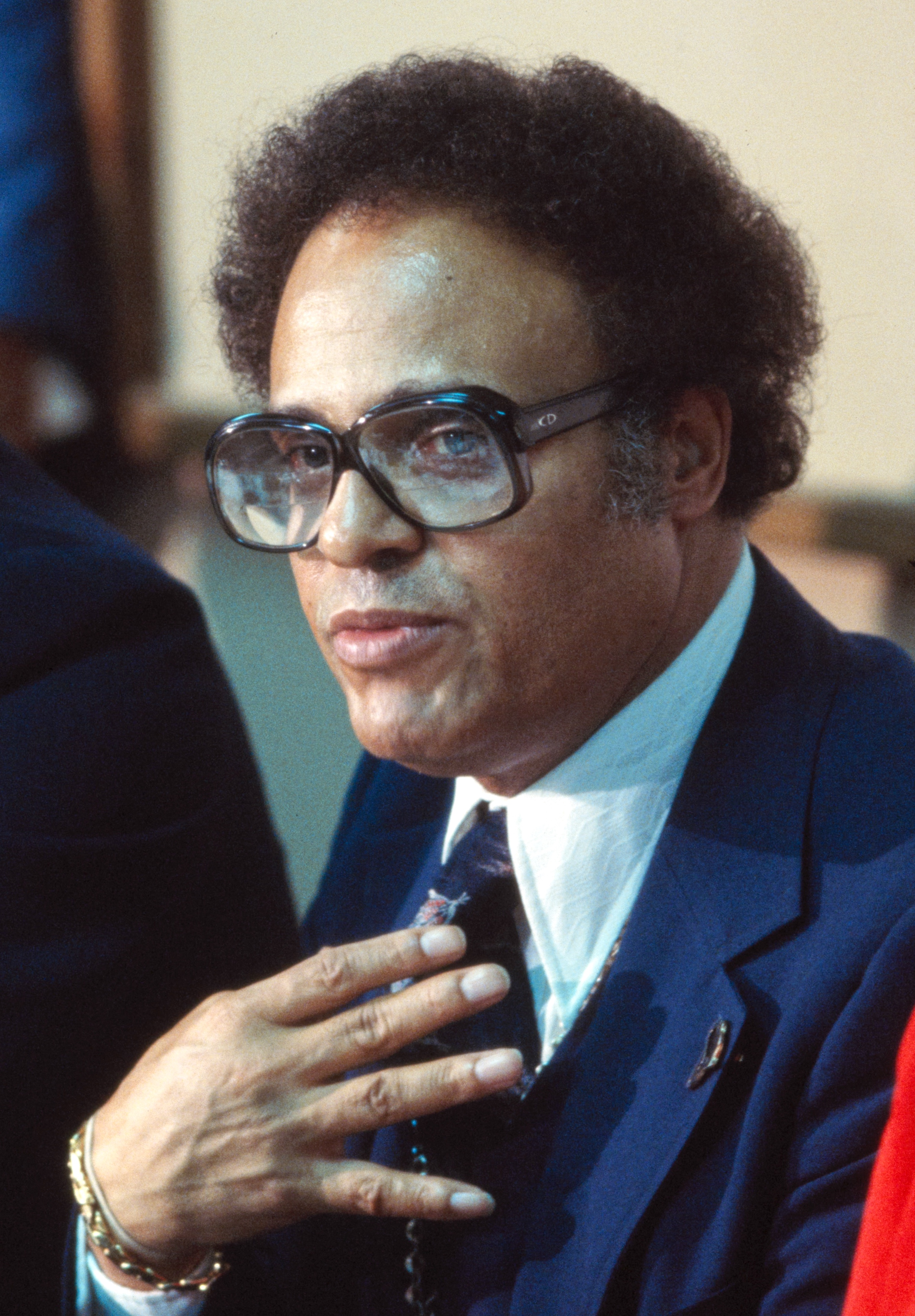
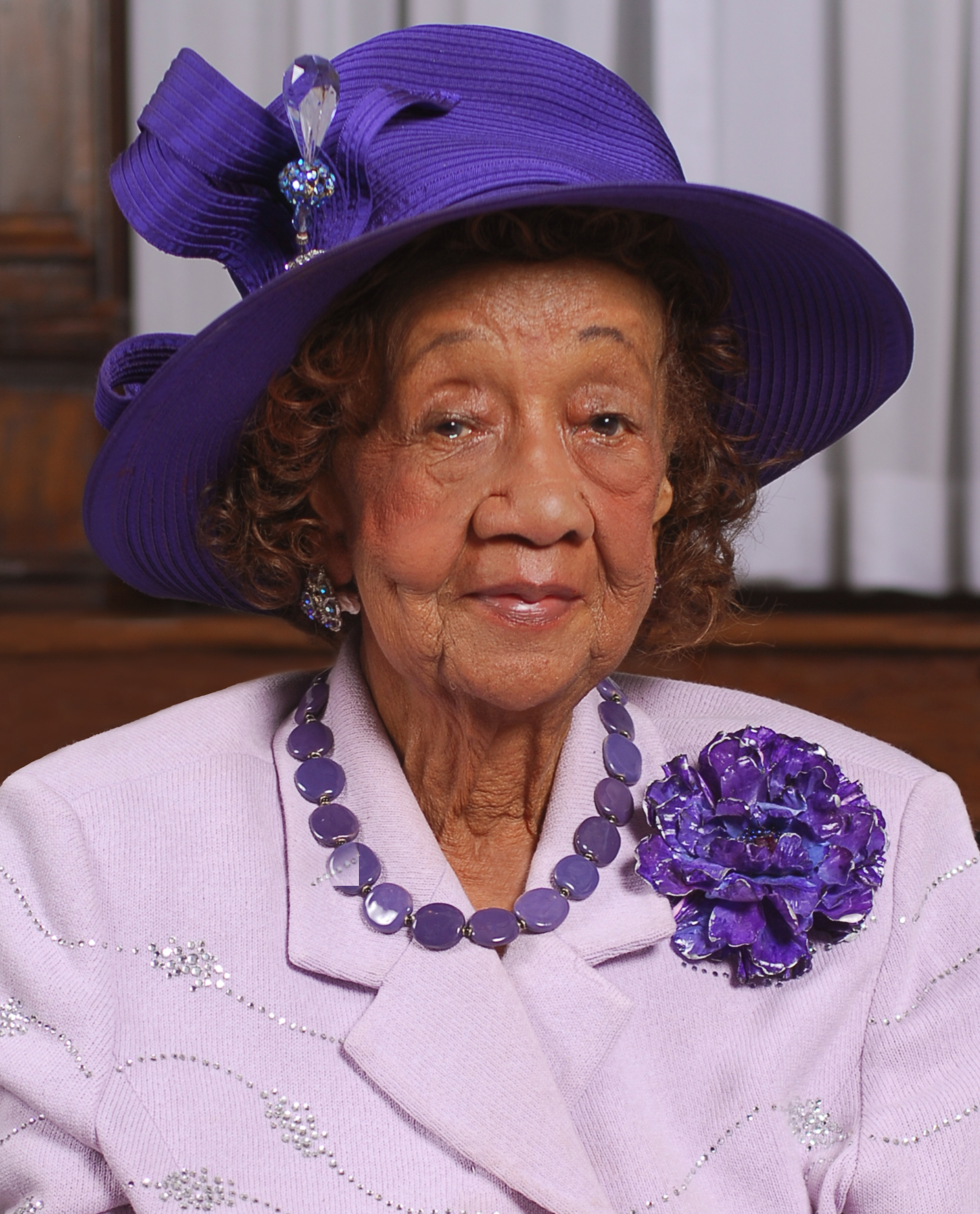
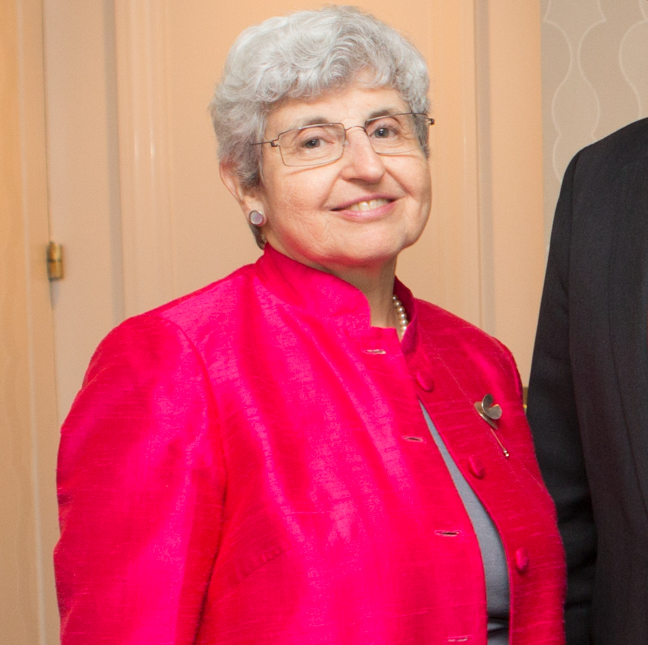
Bayard Rustin (top left), Benjamin Hooks (top right), Dorothy Height (bottom left) and Judith L. Lichtman (bottom right) have been chairperson of the coalition's board of directors.

Wilkins was chair of the board of directors from 1950 to 1980. The role was later held by civil rights activists Bayard Rustin and Benjamin Hooks, civil rights and women's rights activist Dorothy Height, and Judith L. Lichtman.

From 1950 to 1980, Aronson held the roles of director and secretary. He helped organize the national lobbying efforts for the Civil Rights Act of 1964, the Voting Rights Act of 1965, and the Civil Rights Act of 1968. Following his retirement, Aronson founded the Leadership Conference on Civil Rights Education Fund to serve as the education and research arm.

Ralph Neas became the coalition's first full-time executive director in 1981. During his fourteen-year tenure, he "achieved some successes in the face of unremitting hostility, from the extension of the Voting Rights Act in 1982 to the rejection of Robert H. Bork for the Supreme Court in 1987 and the toughening of Federal housing discrimination laws the next year". In 1987, the newspaper's Lena Williams wrote, "admirers of Mr. Neas say that perhaps his greatest achievement has been holding together such a divergent coalition in the highly conservative climate of the last six and a half years". The Washington Post has said he "helped strengthen and create ground-breaking civil rights legislation", including the Americans with Disabilities Act of 1990. Neas held the role until 1995.

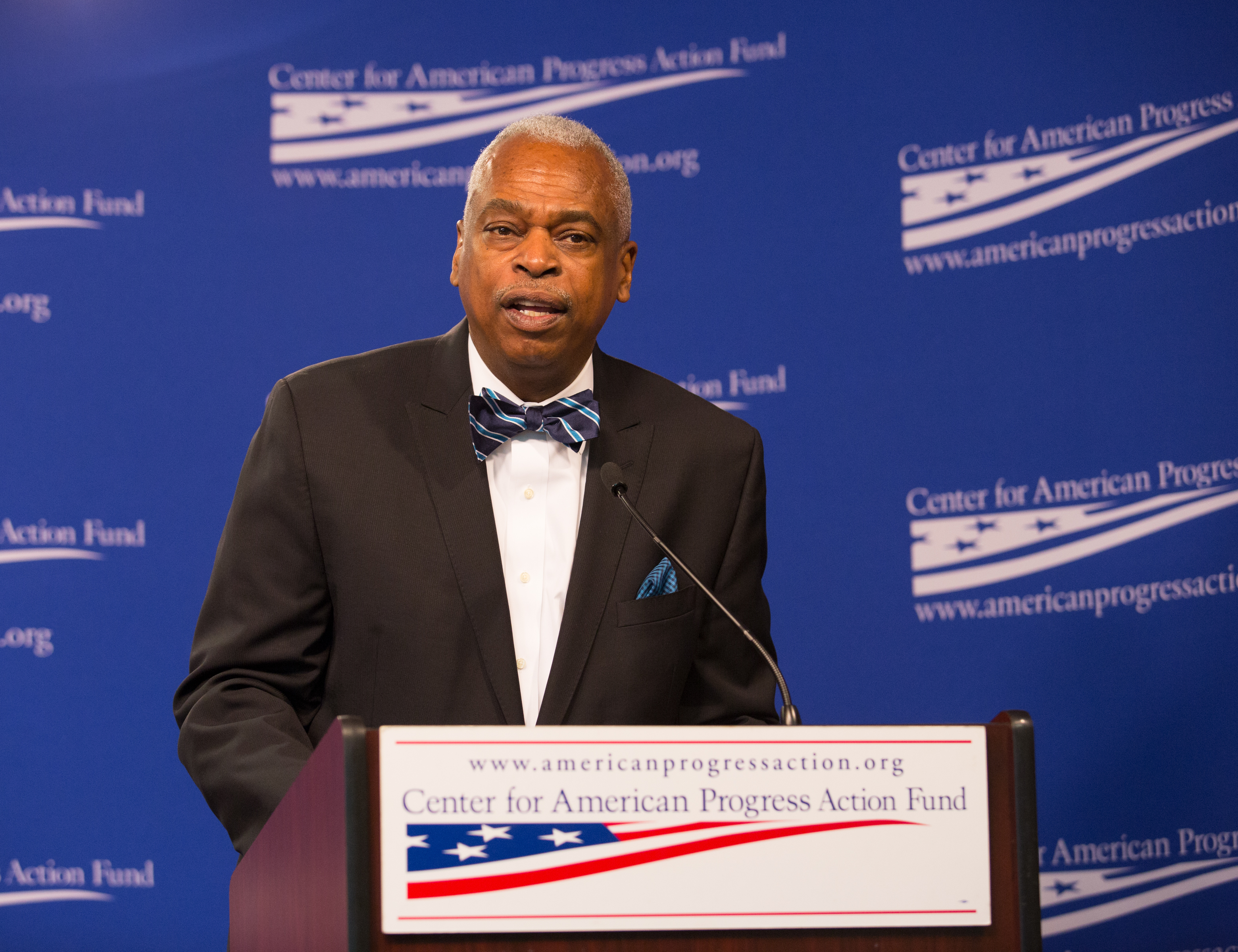
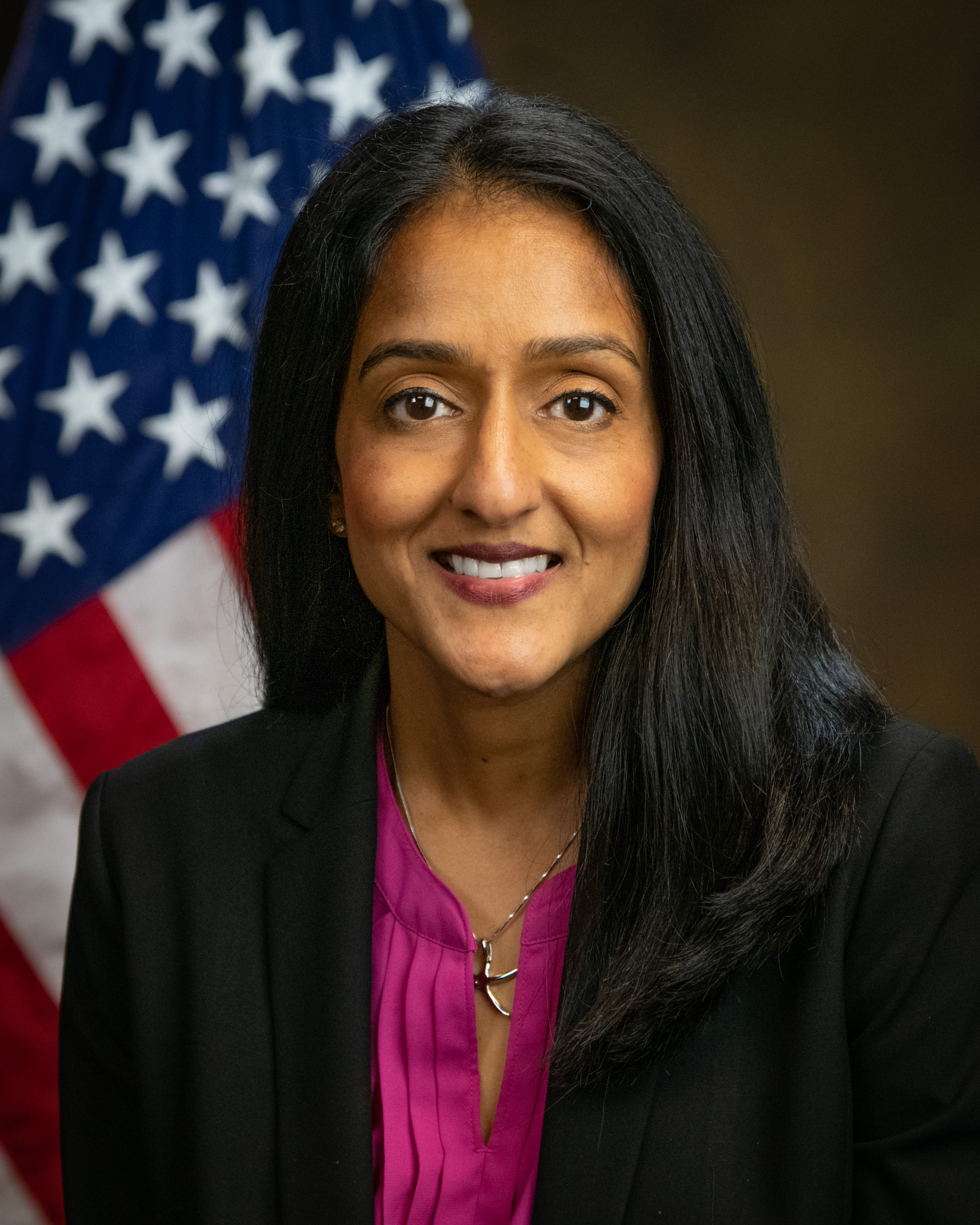
Wade Henderson (left) and Vanita Gupta (right) previously held the roles of president and chief executive officer.

Wade Henderson was the president and CEO for approximately 21 years. In 2017, Marc Morial credited Henderson for increasing the number of member organizations from 170 to 200, including the coalition's first Muslim and Sikh civil rights groups, and for leading the Leadership Conference "through the passage of every major civil rights law" in the past two decades, including the reauthorization of the Voting Rights Act, the Lilly Ledbetter Fair Pay Act, and the Fair Sentencing Act. Henderson was succeeded by Vanita Gupta, who oversaw the Leadership Conference and its Education Fund, in 2017. She was the first woman and first child of immigrants to head the coalition. The Washington Post said she collaborated with Facebook on behalf of the coalition "to shut down misinformation" on the social media and social networking service. Gupta held the role until 2021, when she was nominated to serve as associate attorney general at the U.S. Department of Justice.

Civil rights activist Maya Wiley became president and CEO in 2022. Henderson held an interim leadership role until Wiley's appointment. In 2023, Wiley represented the Leadership Conference at a meeting hosted by Vice President Kamala Harris with labor and rights groups to discuss threats from AI, and as a panelist at the U.S. Senate's inaugural AI Insight Forum, hosted by majority leader Chuck Schumer. Wiley also attended White House meetings during the Biden administration, alongside other civil rights leaders, to advocate for stronger voting rights and more economic opportunities for the Black community.
