= National Health Law Program =

American advocacy organization

- Abbreviation: NHeLP
- Formation: 1969
- Founded at: Los Angeles, California
- Type: Nonprofit organization
- Purpose: Health and civil rights advocacy
- Headquarters: Washington, D.C.
- Location: United States
- Executive Director: Elizabeth G. Taylor
- Revenue: $11,635,405 (2021)
- Website: www.healthlaw.org

The National Health Law Program (NHeLP) is a nonprofit legal and policy advocacy organization founded in Los Angeles, California, in 1969. The mission of the organization is to protect and advance the health and civil rights of low-income and undeserved individuals and families in the United States. The organization addresses these rights through litigation, policy advocacy, and technical assistance to state partners.

== History ==
The National Health Law Program was initially established as a backup legal center by Ruth and Milton Roemer at the University of California, Los Angeles, in 1969. The original name of program was the National Legal Program on Health Problems of the Poor, and was funded through a grant from the federal Office of Economic Opportunity. The initial goals of the organization were to provide legal research, teaching and training for lawyers interested in public interest law. Over its history, the organization has added active offices in Washington, D.C. and Chapel Hill, North Carolina, in addition to California.

== Activities ==
NHeLP employs attorneys and policy experts with experience in health law and civil rights. The organization's attorneys litigate in partnership with state health advocacy groups primarily on behalf of low-income, disabled or other underserved clients. NHeLP's policy attorneys and experts provide national leadership on regulatory and legislative advocacy to defend and advance access to care for low-income and underserved communities across the United States. Specialty areas include non-discrimination rights and enforcement, Medicaid and Medicare eligibility, mental health, disability law, sexual and reproductive health, health insurance eligibility and enrollment, health care services, and delivery system reform. Additionally, NHeLP is assisted by pro bono partners who assist with litigation. The organization also identifies national cases of interest in health law to submit amicus curiae briefs, to express and advocate for certain legal arguments in outside cases.

== Impact and achievements ==
=== Clinton health care reform effort ===
During the first term of President Bill Clinton, NHeLP advocated for the administration's proposal to reform the U.S. health care system. The proposal, which among other things would have extended health coverage to low-income Americans, ultimately did not gain sufficient support in the 103rd United States Congress to become law.

=== Affordable Care Act ===
NHeLP supported passage of the Patient Protection and Affordable Care Act of 2010. The organization worked with the Obama administration and the 111th Congress to provide input on the law, notably Section 1557, its non-discrimination provision. It was the first time that health care discrimination was prohibited on the basis of sex. Since the law's passage, the organization has also engaged in various advocacy and legal efforts to maintain or further expand the law. For example, NHeLP has filed amicus curiae briefs arguing to uphold the law and associated rulemaking efforts in each of the major Supreme Court challenges since passage: National Federation of Independent Business v. Sebelius (2012), King v. Burwell (2015) and California v. Texas (2021).

=== Civil rights and cultural competency in health care ===
NHeLP has researched standards for ensuring appropriate linguistic and cultural competency standards in health care. NHeLP's review of state law requirements and Medicaid managed care contract language at the state level was referenced by the federal HHS Office of Minority Health during the development of the National Standards for Culturally and Linguistically Appropriate Services in Health and Health Care (CLAS Standards).

The standards were first released in 2000, with NHeLP among several partners helping to update them in 2010.

== See also ==
- Health law
- Strategic litigation
- List of health care reform advocacy groups in the United States
