= Vanita Gupta =

American civil rights attorney (born 1974)

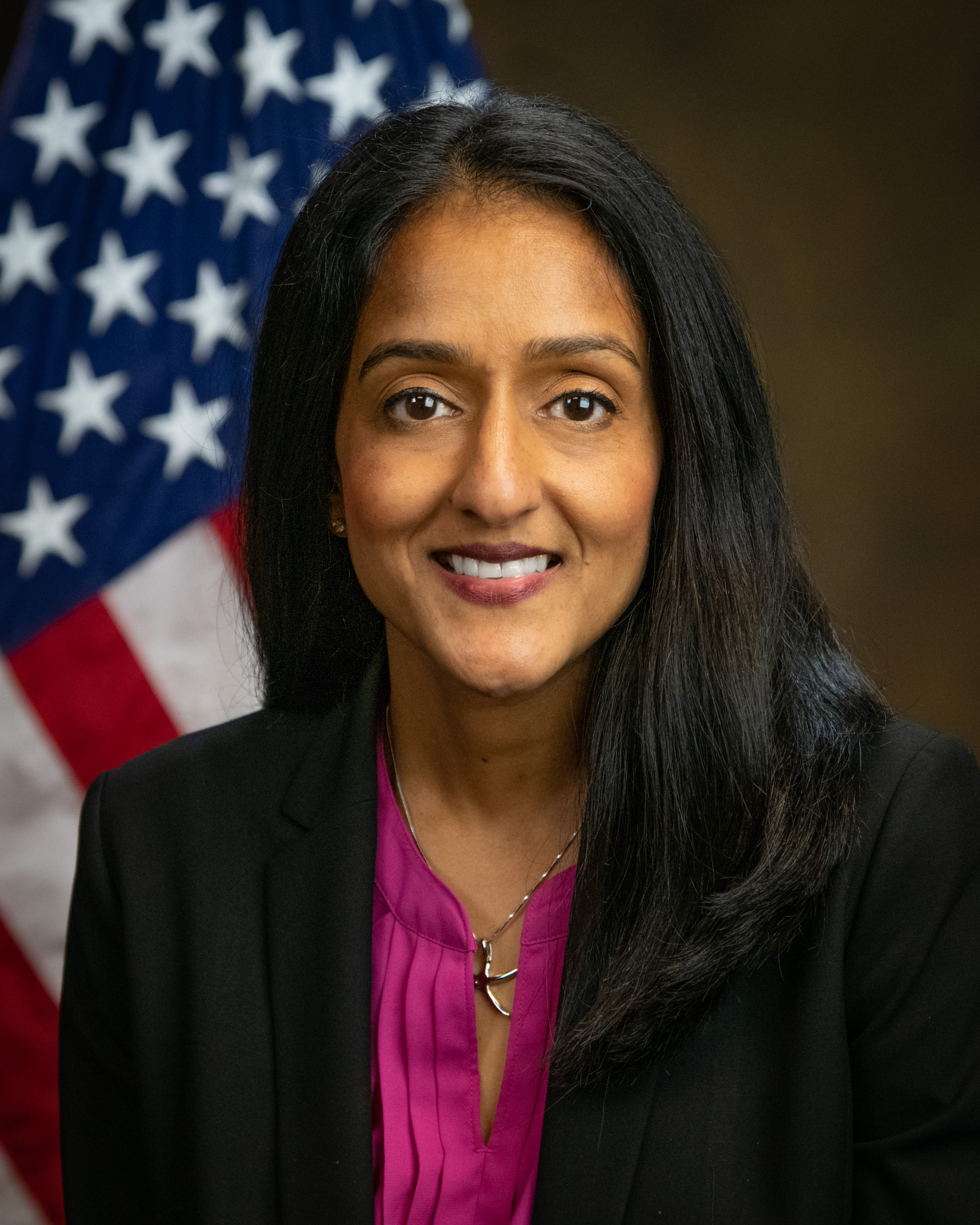
- Official portrait, 2021

19th United States Associate Attorney General
- In office April 22, 2021 – February 2, 2024
- President: Joe Biden
- Preceded by: Rachel Brand (2018)
- Succeeded by: Stanley Woodward Jr.

United States Assistant Attorney General for the Civil Rights Division
- Acting; October 20, 2014 – January 20, 2017
- President: Barack Obama
- Preceded by: Molly Moran
- Succeeded by: Thomas Wheeler

Personal details
- Born: November 15, 1974 (age 52) Media, Pennsylvania, U.S.
- Party: Democratic
- Spouse: Chinh Le
- Children: 2
- Parent: Rajiv L. Gupta (father)
- Education: Yale University (BA); New York University (JD)

Vanita Gupta (born November 15, 1974) is an American attorney and civil rights leader who served as United States Associate Attorney General from April 22, 2021, to February 2, 2024. From 2014 to 2017, Gupta served as Assistant Attorney General for the Civil Rights Division under President Barack Obama. She was considered one of the top choices of the Harris campaign for Attorney General. She is now a Distinguished Scholar in Residence at NYU School of Law.

Gupta served as deputy legal director of the American Civil Liberties Union, where she oversaw its national criminal justice reform efforts. She has also served as Assistant Counsel at the NAACP Legal Defense and Educational Fund.

Throughout her career, she has drawn support from a wide range of liberal and conservative activists, as well as law enforcement groups, for building support for policing and criminal justice reform. Before becoming Associate Attorney General, Gupta served as president and chief executive officer of the Leadership Conference on Civil and Human Rights from 2017 until her nomination as Associate Attorney General in 2021.

== Early life and education ==
Gupta was born in Media, Pennsylvania, to Indian immigrant parents. She is the daughter of Muzaffarnagar-born businessman Rajiv L. Gupta and Kamla Varshney. Her father is the chairman of Aptiv, an automotive parts company.

As a child, Gupta regularly moved with her family, and lived in the United Kingdom and France before returning to Philadelphia. She graduated from Yale University in 1996 with a Bachelor of Arts, magna cum laude. Gupta credits her experience at Yale with helping form her "passion for social activism". She received a Juris Doctor in 2001 from the New York University School of Law, where she was an editor of the Review of Law & Social Change.

== Legal advocacy ==
=== NAACP Legal Defense Fund ===
Gupta's first case, while working for the Legal Defense Fund directly after law school, involved 40 African Americans and six white or Latino people who were romantic partners of African Americans in Tulia, Texas. They had been convicted by all-white juries of dealing drugs. In almost every case, the only evidence was the testimony of an undercover agent, Tom Coleman.

Coleman did not use wiretaps or marked money, and records showed that he had "filed shoddy reports". He had previous misdemeanor charges for stealing gasoline from a county pump and abuse of official capacity. Gupta won the release of her clients in 2003, four years after they were jailed, then negotiated a $6 million settlement for them. In 2004, she received the Reebok Human Rights Award. As of 2018, Paramount is making a film, Tulia, about the case.

=== ACLU ===
In 2007, after becoming a staff attorney at the American Civil Liberties Union, Gupta filed a lawsuit against U.S. Immigration and Customs Enforcement (ICE) about detention conditions for children whose parents were asylum seekers. In August 2007, a landmark agreement was reached between ACLU and ICE, under which the conditions in the T. Don Hutto Residential Center improved and several children were released from the center.

On August 6, 2009, the Department of Homeland Security announced intentions to improve the nation's immigration detention system, including ending family detention at the T. Don Hutto Residential Center.

After her time as a staff attorney at the ACLU, Gupta served as its deputy legal director and director of its Center for Justice. She has been credited with pioneering the ACLU's National Campaign to End Mass Incarceration. She built bipartisan coalitions to advance pre-trial and sentencing reforms around the country.

=== Leadership Conference on Civil and Human Rights ===
In 2017, Gupta became president and chief executive officer of the Leadership Conference on Civil and Human Rights. In this role, she criticized the Trump administration for its response to the Charlottesville Unite the Right rally and accused then-Attorney General Jeff Sessions of trying to increase mass incarceration.

In June 2020, Gupta testified before the Senate Judiciary Committee about the murder of George Floyd and the need to end police brutality in the United States.

During her time at the organization, Gupta worked to combat harmful online misinformation, and "often sat shoulder-to-shoulder with tech leaders including Mark Zuckerberg and Sheryl Sandberg" to discuss content moderation strategies. She took a leave from the organization in January 2021 and formally left once confirmed as Associate Attorney General in April 2021.

== Assistant Attorney General for Civil Rights (2014–2017) ==
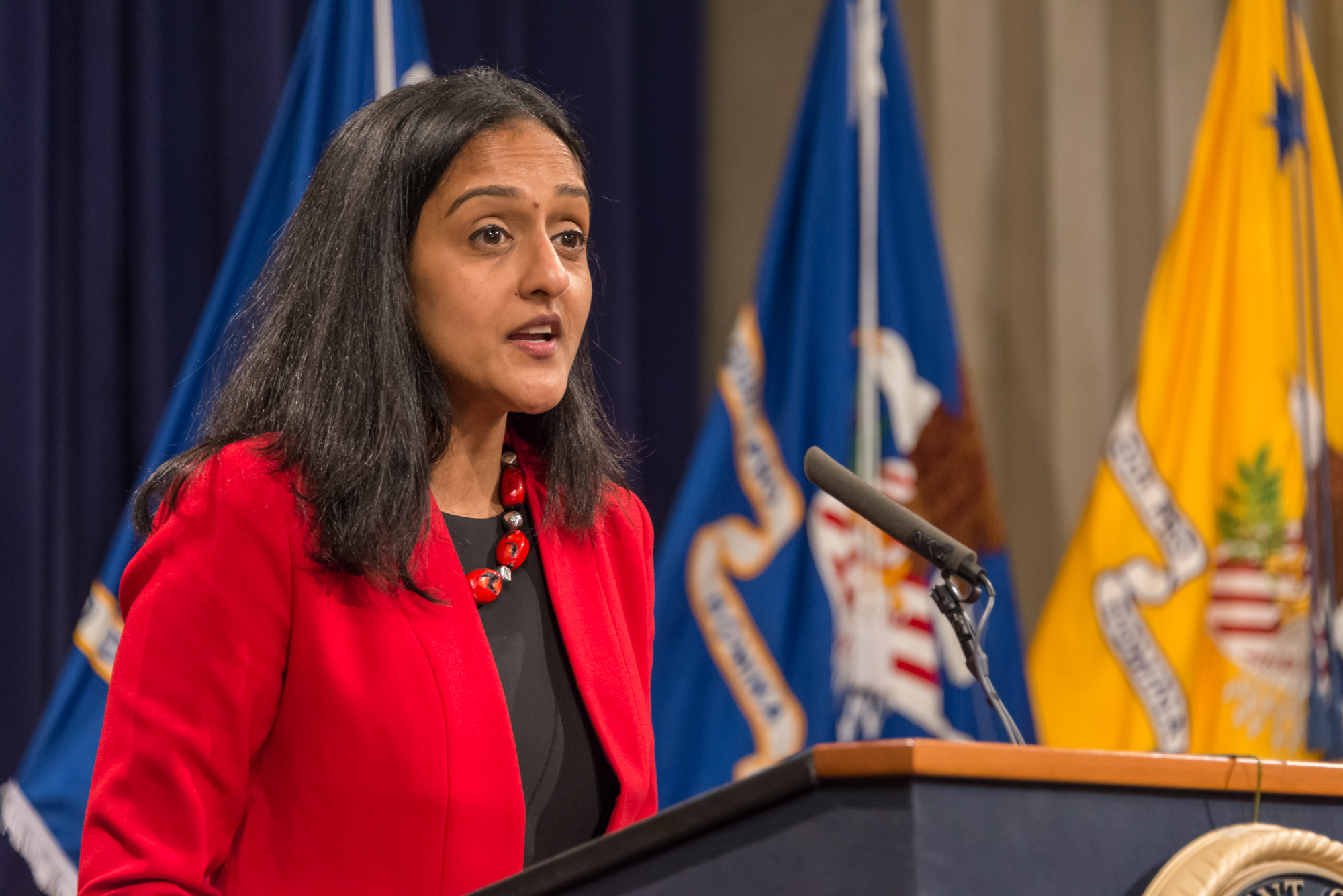
Gupta speaks at a naturalization ceremony in 2016

In October 2014, President Barack Obama appointed Gupta as the United States Assistant Attorney General for Civil Rights and head of the Department of Justice's Civil Rights Division.

Under Gupta's leadership, the Civil Rights Division worked to advance criminal justice reform and constitutional policing, including by investigating and working to reform police departments in Ferguson, Missouri; Cleveland; Baltimore, and Chicago, among other cities. Gupta also oversaw a wide range of other enforcement efforts for the Division, including prosecuting hate crimes and human trafficking, promoting disability rights, protecting LGBT rights, and combating discrimination in education, employment, housing, lending and voting.

Gupta's tenure was marked by several high-profile matters, including the investigations of the Ferguson, Baltimore, and Chicago police departments; the appeals of the Texas and North Carolina voter ID cases; the challenge to North Carolina's HB2 law and other LGBTQ2 rights litigation; enforcement of education, land use, hate crimes, and other statutes to combat religious discrimination; the issuance of statements of interest on bail and indigent defense reform, and letters to state and local court judges and administrators on the unlawful imposition of fines and fees in the criminal justice system; and the administration's report on solitary confinement.

In 2016, under Gupta's leadership, the division sued North Carolina, alleging that the state's implementation of House Bill 2 discriminated against transgender individuals in violation of federal civil rights laws.

In August 2016, an investigation by Gupta's division concluded that the Baltimore Police Department engaged in a pattern or practice of conduct that violated the Constitution and federal statutory law, including unconstitutional stops, searches, arrests, excessive force, and enforcement strategies that produced an unjustified disparate impact on African-American residents.

== Associate Attorney General (2021–2024) ==
=== Nomination ===
On January 7, 2021, President Joe Biden nominated Gupta to serve as the United States Associate Attorney General. On March 9, the Senate Judiciary Committee held a hearing on her nomination. Her nomination was supported by a broad range of civil rights and law enforcement groups, as well as by prominent conservatives who had worked with her on criminal justice reform and voting rights. Christine Todd Whitman, a Republican who served in the George W. Bush administration, endorsed her nomination.

As a nominee, Gupta pledged to support strong antitrust enforcement by the DOJ if confirmed.

Gupta faced strong opposition from Republicans who criticized her civil rights advocacy, particularly during the Trump administration. The Senate confirmed Gupta by a 51–49 vote on April 21 after Republican Senator Lisa Murkowski agreed to vote to confirm her. Gupta pledged to sell her remaining $14.5 million stake in Avantor, a company her father chairs, amid questioning about a report that the company sold chemicals diverted by Mexican drug cartels to make heroin.

=== Tenure ===
Gupta was sworn in on April 22, 2021. On April 27, 2022, she announced the launch of the National Law Enforcement Knowledge Lab, an initiative to create a "free, voluntary one-stop-shop for information, guidance and training for law enforcement agencies." The police-reform lab is part of a "push to boost best policing practices", The Hill reported. After the Robb Elementary School shooting in Uvalde, Texas, Gupta joined Attorney General Merrick Garland and Deputy Attorney General Lisa Monaco in reviewing local law enforcement's response to the shooting.

Gupta has said that the Justice Department intends to take a hard line on "killer acquisitions" as part of the Biden administration's effort to rein in monopolies. She is reportedly responsible for deciding whether Jonathan Kanter, Assistant Attorney General for the Antitrust Division, will be permitted to participate in the United States v. Google LLC case. In January 2023, it was reported that Kanter would be cleared to continue to work on DOJ cases involving Google.

In December 2021, Gupta announced a lawsuit against the state of Texas following the state's redistricting process, which the DOJ determined was in violation of the Voting Rights Act of 1965.

In July 2023, Gupta announced a lawsuit against the state of Texas for installing floating barriers in the Rio Grande without federal authorization, saying the devices presented "threats to navigation and public safety and humanitarian concerns".

On January 4, 2024, Gupta announced that the Justice Department was suing the state of Texas on the grounds that its enforcement of Senate Bill 4, allowing state and local police to arrest people suspected of entering the United States unlawfully, was unconstitutional. The complaint argued the state's enforcement of the bill was preempted by federal law. On March 12, 2024, the U.S. Supreme Court extended the pause on enforcing the bill pending further argument. On March 19, the Court ruled that Texas may begin enforcing SB 4 while a lawsuit over its constitutionality remains pending before a federal appeals court.

On January 31, 2024, it was reported that Gupta would leave her role as associate attorney general the following week.

== Criticism ==
Over 40 South Asian groups and civil rights organizations have drawn attention to Gupta's role in the University of Farmington scandal. They have called on her to return $6 million in tuition money to South Asian students who they allege were racially targeted and tricked by U.S. Immigration and Customs Enforcement into attending the fake university. In the advocates' view, Gupta's lack of action is an example of the Biden administration's poor treatment of immigrants. Lakshmi Sridaran, executive director of SAALT, alleges that Gupta has the power to immediately return the $6 million paid to DHS, but does not say on what legal basis that is true. Gupta has never worked at DHS or ICE, the two agencies involved in the scandal. The South Asian groups are suing DHS, not DOJ where Gupta worked until 2024.

== Personal life and recognition ==
Gupta is married to Chinh Q. Le, Professor of Practice at the University of Virginia School of Law. They have two sons. In 2022, Gupta received the Charles R. Richey Equal Justice Award from George Washington University Law School.
