= Judith L. Lichtman =

American attorney and activist

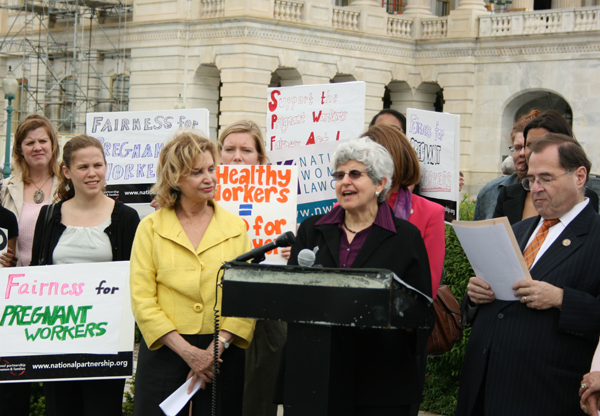
- Lichtman speaks at the Pregnant Workers Fairness Act press conference, May 2012
- Education: University of Wisconsin Law School
- Occupation: Attorney
- Title: Senior advisor of the National Partnership for Women & Families

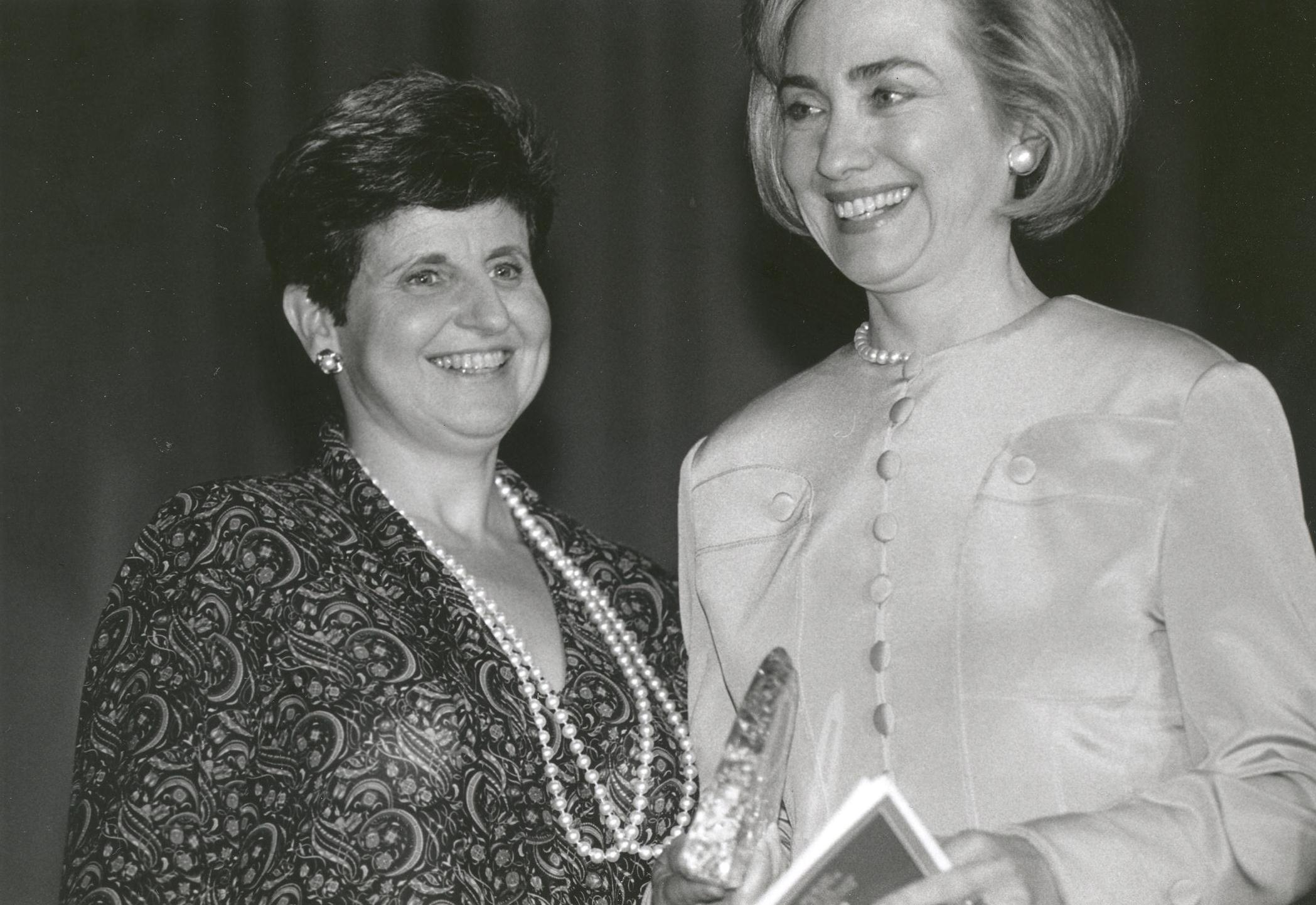
Lichtman honors then-First Lady Hillary Clinton at the Women's Legal Defense Fund's annual luncheon, June 1994

Judith L. Lichtman is an American attorney specializing in women's rights and an advocate for human and civil rights. Lichtman currently serves as the senior advisor of the National Partnership for Women & Families. She is largely credited with the passage of the Family and Medical Leave Act of 1993.

== Career ==
Judith Lichtman graduated from the University of Wisconsin Law School in 1965 as one of two women in a class of 150.

Lichtman began her legal career as a civil rights attorney working on school desegregation in the southern United States for the federal Department of Health, Education and Welfare. In 1968, she joined the faculty at Jackson State College, a historically black college in Mississippi. She later returned to the District of Columbia to work at the Urban Coalition on school desegregation. For two years, Lichtman worked at the U.S. Commission on Civil Rights, conducting hearings in the South on the treatment of black students and black teachers after desegregation. Lichtman also worked with the commission to investigate low-income women's issues and the link between race and gender. In 1972, Lichtman left the commission to work on George McGovern’s presidential campaign. Lichtman later served as a legal advisor to Puerto Rico.

In 1974, Lichtman began work with the Women's Legal Defense Fund (WLDF), now known as the National Partnership for Women & Families, as the executive director and first paid staff member. Lichtman served as president of the National Partnership from 1988 to 2004. She has since served as the organization's senior advisor and also serves on its board.

During her time as the executive director, president and senior advisor of the National Partnership, Lichtman and her organization have been credited with helping to pass several pieces of legislation, including: the Pregnancy Discrimination Act of 1978, the Civil Rights Act of 1991, the Health Insurance Portability and Accountability Act of 1996 and, mostly notably, the Family and Medical Leave Act of 1993, which is referred to as the "Judy Lichtman Act" by insiders on Capitol Hill.

Lichtman helped establish what is now Georgetown University's Women's Law and Public Policy Fellowship Program, which provides one-year fellowships for recent law graduates, and the Women's Appointments Project, a bipartisan coalition that advocates for the appointment of women to senior executive branch positions.

Lichtman is a founder of EMILY's List.

== Board and committee membership ==
Lichtman has served on numerous boards and advisory committees, including: the Leadership Conference on Civil and Human Rights, the Center for American Progress, EMILY's List, Equal Justice Works, the American Constitution Society for Law and Policy, Mississippi Center for Justice, and the American Civil Liberties Union's Women's Rights Project.

Lichtman served on both the D.C. Federal Judicial Nominating Commission and the D.C. Judicial Nomination Commission. She chaired the D.C. Judicial Nomination Commission.

== Awards, honors and notable mentions ==
Judith Lichtman received the 1989 Frontrunner Award in Humanities from the Sara Lee Corporation. That same year, Lichtman was named Woman Lawyer of the Year by the Women's Bar Association.

In 2000, Lichtman received the Leadership Conference on Civil Rights Hubert H. Humphrey Award for her involvement in the advancement of human and civil rights. Also in 2000, Lichtman received the Fannie Mae and Working Woman Diversity Award for her work in the nonprofit sector. In 2001, the Council for Court Excellence Justice Potter Stewart Award was presented to Lichtman for her contributions to the administration of justice in the community. Lichtman received the Margaret Brent Achievement Award in 2005, presented by the American Bar Association Commission on Women in the Profession.

Washingtonian magazine has identified Lichtman as one of Washington, D.C.'s most powerful women, and named her Washingtonian of the Year in 1986 and one of the 100 Most Important Women in Washington in 1989. Ladies Home Journal named her one of America's 100 Most Important Women in 1988.

Former president Bill Clinton has referred to Lichtman as "a remarkable national treasure" and the late Senator Ted Kennedy nicknamed her the "101st Senator".

President of the National Partnership for Women & Families; 1988 - 2004	Succeeded by Debra L. Ness
