= National Coalition on Health Care =

US health system reform organization

National Coalition on Health Care (NCHC) is a coalition of groups working to achieve comprehensive health system reform. Founded in 1990 by Dr. Henry E. Simmons, M.D., NCHC is a non-profit alliance of more than 80 organizations.

The coalition has a stated commitment to building a national bipartisan consensus in support for enactment and implementation of sustainable, systemic and system-wide health care reform.

== Coalition principles ==
The coalition's mission is grounded on five interdependent principles forming a framework for improving America's health care system:

- Health care coverage for all
- Cost management
- Improvement of health care quality and safety
- Equitable financing
- Simplified administration

== Member organizations ==
The National Coalition on Health Care comprises the following member organizations.

Member organizations:

- AARP
- Adrian Dominican Sisters
- AFL–CIO
- American Academy of Family Physicians
- American Academy of Pediatrics
- American Association of Community Colleges
- American Association of State Colleges and Universities
- American Cancer Society
- American College of Cardiology
- American College of Emergency Physicians
- American College of Nurse Midwives
- American College of Surgeons
- American Council on Education
- American Dental Education Association
- American Federation of State, County, and Municipal Employees (AFSCME), AFL–CIO
- American Federation of Teachers
- American Federation of Television and Radio Artists
- American Heart Association
- American Legacy Foundation
- American Library Association
- American Lung Association
- Asian Pacific Islander American Health Forum
- Association of American Medical Colleges, Council of Teaching Hospitals and Health Systems
- Association of American Universities
- Breast Cancer Network of Strength
- C-Change
- California Public Employees' Retirement System (CalPERS)
- California State Teachers' Retirement System (CalSTRS)
- Children's Defense Fund
- CodeBlueNow!
- Colorado Public Employee Retirement Association
- Common Cause
- Partnership for Health Care Reform (Communication Workers of America)
- Consortium for Citizens with Disabilities
- Consumers Union
- Duke Energy
- Duke University Medical Center
- Easter Seals
- The Episcopal Church
- The Evangelical Lutheran Church in America
- Giant Food, Inc.
- Gross Electric, Inc.
- Illinois Municipal Retirement Fund
- Partnership for Health Care Reform (International Brotherhood of Electrical Workers)
- International Brotherhood of Teamsters Union
- International Federation of Professional and Technical Engineers, AFL–CIO
- International Foundation for Employee Benefit Plans
- Iowa Farm Bureau Federation
- Japanese American Citizens League
- Johns Hopkins Medicine
- League of Women Voters
- Maternity Center Association
- Michigan Health & Hospital Association
- Midwest Business Group on Health
- Motion Picture Association of America
- National Association for the Advancement of Colored People (NAACP)
- National Association of Childbearing Centers
- National Association of Independent Colleges and Universities
- National Community Action Foundation
- National Conference of Public Employee Retirement Systems
- National Consumers League
- National Coordinating Committee for Multi-Employer Plans
- National Council of Churches of Christ in the U.S.A.
- National Council of La Raza
- National Council on Teacher Retirement
- National Education Association
- National Multiple Sclerosis Society
- New York State Teachers' Retirement System
- Organization of Chinese Americans
- Presbyterian Church (U.S.A.)
- Religious Action Center of Reform Judaism
- Salvation Army
- Sheet Metal Workers' International Association, AFL–CIO
- Small Business Majority
- Stop & Shop, Inc.
- Teva Pharmaceutical Industries, Ltd.
- Union for Reform Judaism
- United Food and Commercial Workers International Union, AFL–CIO
- United Methodist Church – General Board of Church and Society
- United States Conference of Catholic Bishops
- U.S. PIRG
- Partnership for Health Care Reform (Verizon)
