= List of Drexel University alumni =

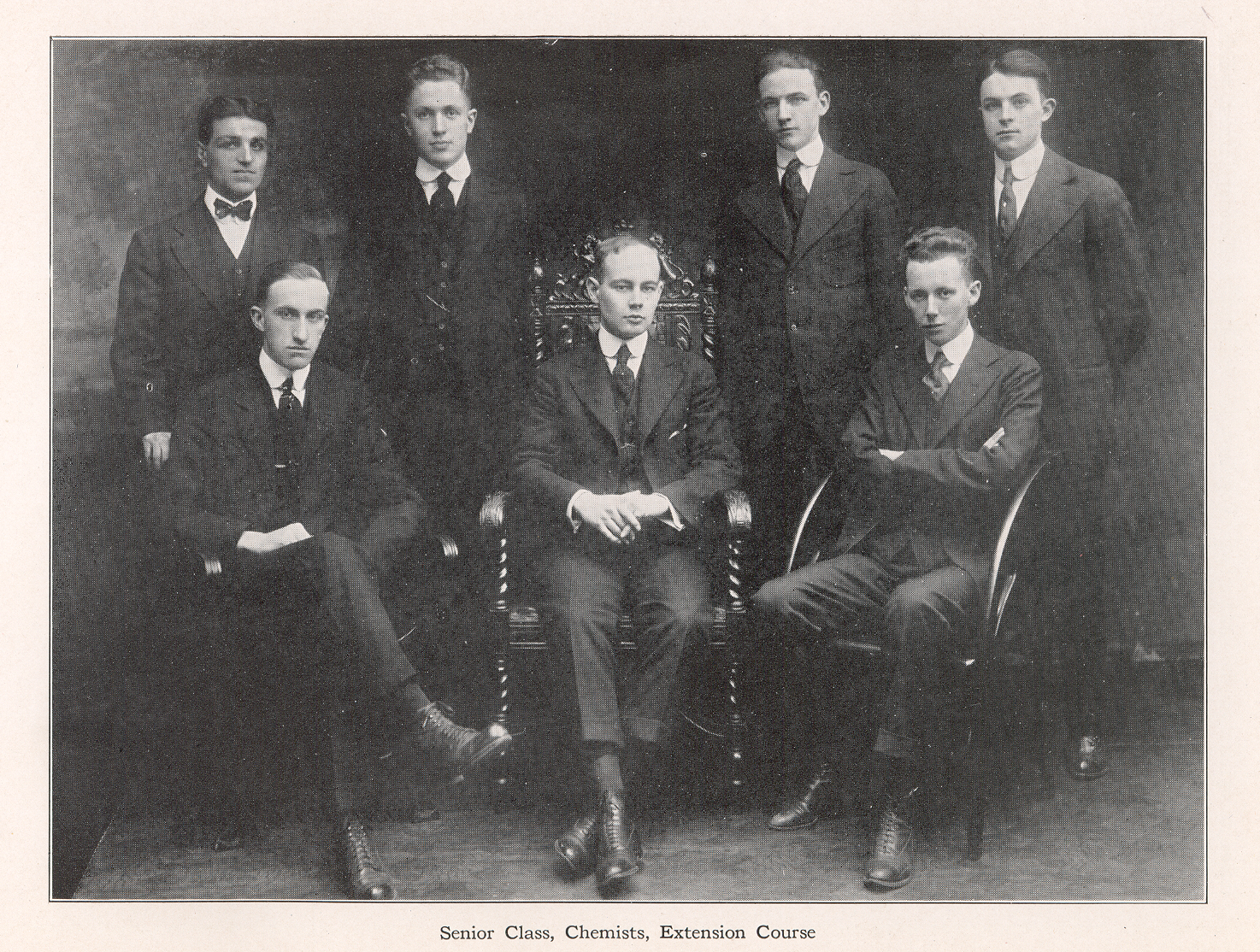
The 1916 class of senior chemist students were among the first graduates to earn a bachelor's degree.

Drexel University is a private university located in Philadelphia, Pennsylvania, United States. The 16th largest private university in the nation, Drexel is made up of nine colleges and four schools, most of which serve both undergraduate and graduate students. It offers 96 undergraduate degree programs, 88 master's programs, and 35 doctoral programs. Drexel was founded as a technical school in 1891 for the "improvement of industrial education as a means of opening better and wider avenues of employment to young men and women." Drexel began awarding undergraduate degrees in 1914, starting with the Bachelor of Science in engineering; before that, Drexel granted certificates or diplomas in the field of enrollment. In 1931, Drexel began offering graduate degrees through the School of Home Economics.

Since its founding the university has graduated over 100,000 alumni. Certificate-earning alumni such as artist Violet Oakley and illustrator Frank Schoonover reflect the early emphasis on art as part of the university's curriculum. With World War II, the university's technical programs swelled, and as a result Drexel graduated alumni such as Paul Baran, one of the founding fathers of the Internet and one of the inventors of the packet switching network, and Norman Joseph Woodland the inventor of barcode technology. In addition to its emphasis on technology Drexel has graduated several notable athletes such as National Basketball Association (NBA) basketball players Michael Anderson and Malik Rose, and several notable business people such as Raj Gupta, former president and chief executive officer of Rohm and Haas, and Nicholas Schorsch, chief executive officer of VEREIT, and Nicholas Howley, founder and chairman of TransDigm Group.

== Notable alumni ==
- A "—" indicates that the information is unknown.

Degree abbreviations

- Cert – Certificate
- BS – Bachelor of Science
- Postgraduate degrees:

- MA – Master of Arts
- MBA – Master of Business Administration
- MD – Doctor of Medicine
- MS – Master of Science
- PhD – Doctor of Philosophy

=== Business ===
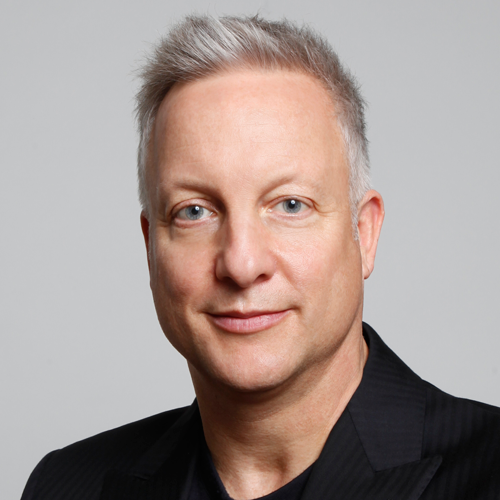
Michael Baum, class of 1985

Name	Grad year	Degree	Notability	Ref(s)
Ramani Ayer	1973	PhD	Former CEO of The Hartford Financial Services	
Michael Baum	1985	BS	Founder and CEO of Splunk and Founder.org; former VP of e-Commerce at Yahoo! and The Walt Disney Company	
Albert Boscov	1952	BS	Former CEO of Boscov's	
Kenneth C. Dahlberg	1967	BS	Former CEO of SAIC, former executive vice president of General Dynamics	
Dana Dornsife	1983	BS	CEO of Lazarex Cancer Foundation	
Elaine Garzarelli	1969 1977	BS MBA	Financial analyst credited with predicting Black Monday, the stock market crash of 1987	
Raj Gupta	1972	MBA	Former president and CEO of Rohm and Haas	
Bennett S. LeBow	1960	BS	Former CEO and chairman of the board of Borders; chairman of the board of Vector Group	
Earl Lestz	1961	BS	Former president of operations for Paramount Studios	
Richelle Parham	1991	BS	Former vice president and chief marketing officer of eBay	
Dorcas Bates Reilly	1947	BS	Invented the green bean casserole while working as a staff member in the home economics department of the Campbell's	
Nicholas Schorsch	—	—	CEO and co-founder of VEREIT	
Toots Shor	1955	BS	Renowned saloon keeper in New York City	
Anne L. Stevens	1980	BS	Non-executive director at Anglo American plc, former CEO of GKN Aerospace	
Richard J. Tobin	—	MBA	CEO of Dover Corporation, director of KeyCorp	
Christina Visco	—	—	CEO of TerraLeaf, entrepreneur and businesswoman in the cannabis industry	

=== Humanities ===
==== Architects ====
Name	Grad year	Degree	Notability	Ref(s)
Juan M. Arellano	1911	Cert	Filipino architect who designed the Manila Metropolitan Theater	
Douglas Ellington	1912	Cert	Architect known for his work in the Art Deco style; first American to win the Rougevin prize	
William Sidney Pittman	1900	Cert	Architect who designed notable buildings in Washington, D.C. and Texas	
Rudolph Weaver	1905 1919	Cert BS	Architect; founding dean of three architecture schools; official architect for two universities and one state system of three universities	

==== Arts and entertainment ====
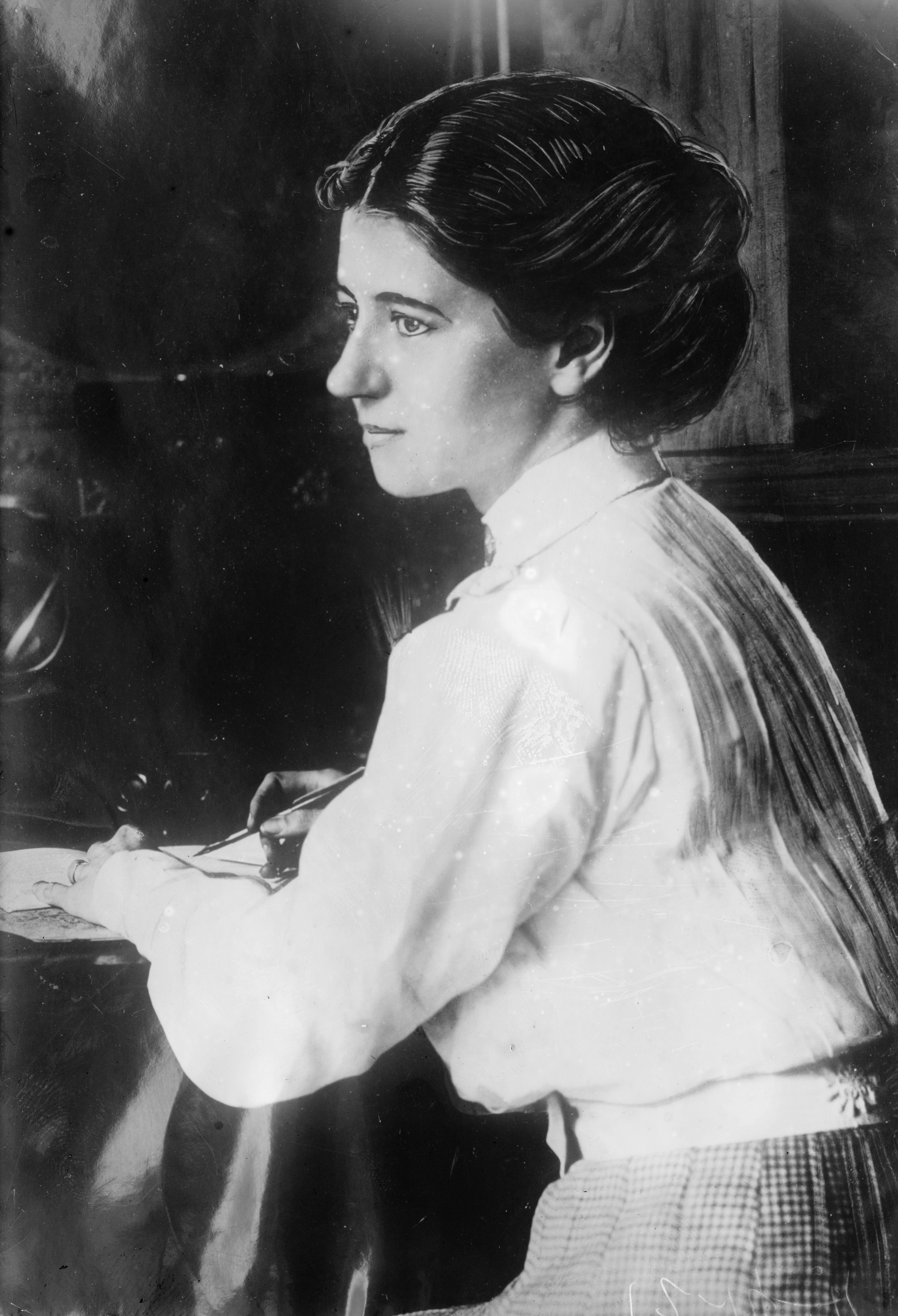
Violet Oakley, class of 1948

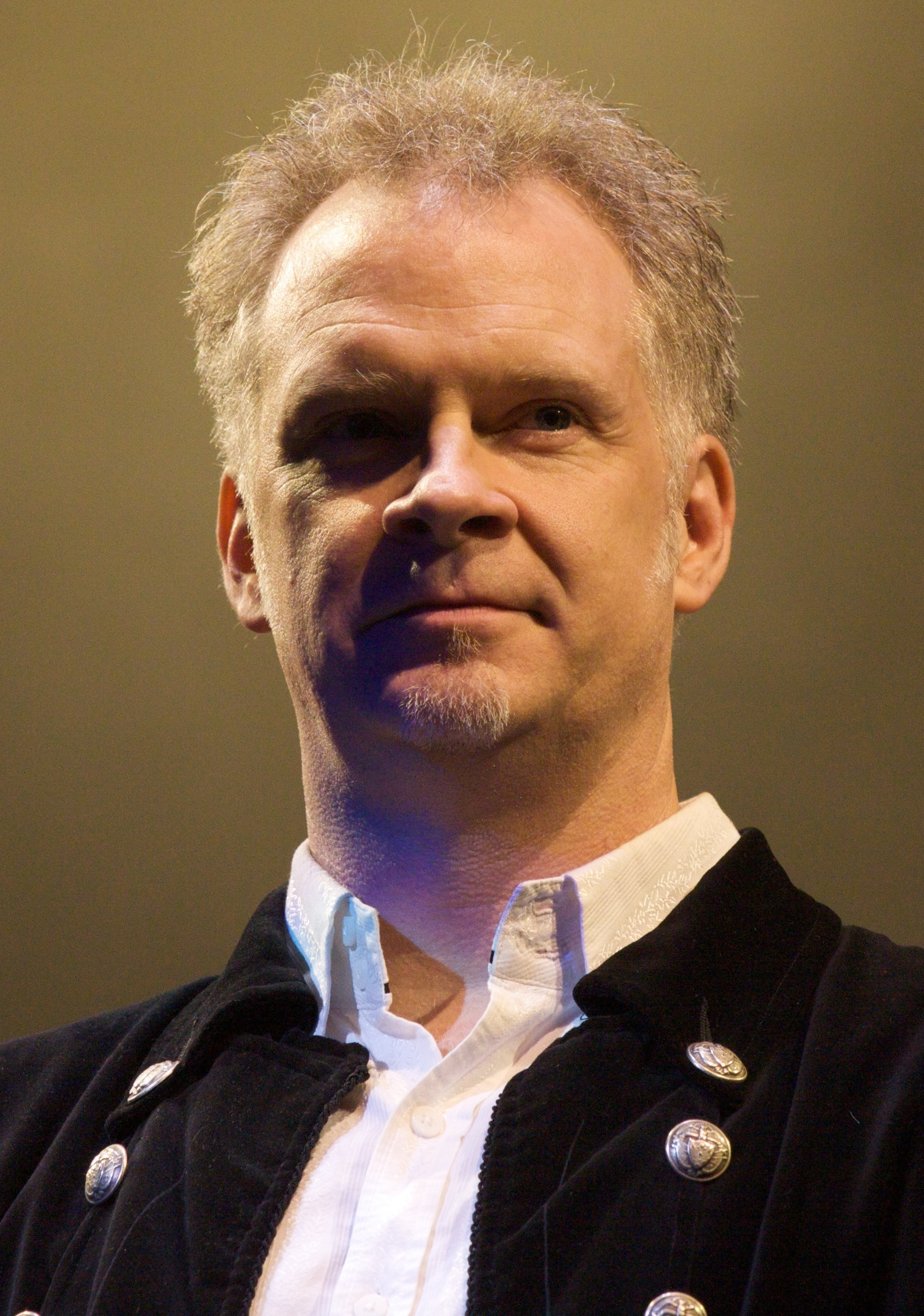
Jack Wall, class of 1986

Name	Grad year	Degree	Notability	Ref(s)
Chuck Barris	1953	BS	Entertainer; creator of The Gong Show	
Louise Heims Beck	1911	BS	Vaudeville performer, theatre manager, librarian, co-founder and chairman of the American Theatre Wing, chairman of the Actors' Fund of America (1960–1978), and head organizer of the 1st Tony Awards	
Howard Benson	1980	BS	Grammy Award-winning music producer	
Tom Fulp	2002	BS	Founder of Newgrounds	
David Kresh	1966	MS	Poet and reference specialist at the Library of Congress	
Elizabeth McCracken	1997	MS	Author of Here's Your Hat What's Your Hurry and professor of creative writing at the University of Texas at Austin	
Chris McKendry	1990	BS	ESPN anchor and journalist	
Katherine McNamara	2013	BS	Actress, best known for her role as Clary Fray in Shadowhunters	
Pat Munday	1978	BS	Author, professor, and environmentalist	
Violet Oakley	1948	—	Artist; first woman to receive the Gold Medal of Honor from the Pennsylvania Academy of the Fine Arts	
Maxfield Parrish	1895	Cert	Early twentieth-century artist whose work included illustrating Mother Goose in Prose and Collier's Weekly	
Meinhardt Raabe	1970	MBA	Actor, known for his role as the Munchkin coroner in The Wizard of Oz	
Frank Schoonover	1900	Cert	Illustrator for Hopalong Cassidy stories as well as the book A Princess of Mars	
Susan Seidelman	1973	BS	Filmmaker whose film Smithereens was the first American independent film invited to compete at the 1982 Cannes Film Festival	
Cameron Snyder	1941	—	Sportswriter, Dick McCann Memorial Award winner	
Sarah Stolfa	2005	BS	Photographer, won The New York Times Photography Contest for College Students in 2004	
Corinne Trang	2003	BS	Author of several Asian-themed cookbooks	
Jack Wall	1986	BS	Video game music composer	
Stephen Ward	2003	BS	Host and executive producer of Tough Love	
Stephen M. Wolownik	1989	MS	Pioneer in the Russian and Eastern European music community in the United States	
Zircon	2009	MS	Founder and CEO of Impact Soundworks	

==== Education ====
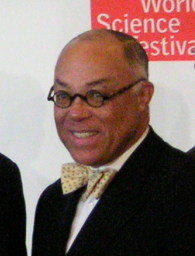
George Campbell Jr., class of 1968

Name	Grad year	Degree	Notability	Ref(s)
Michael Behe	1974	BS	Biochemist, professor, leading proponent of intelligent design, and a senior fellow of the Discovery Institute's Center for Science and Culture	
Wiesław Binienda	1987	PhD	Professor and chairman of the Department of Civil Engineering at the University of Akron	
George Campbell Jr.	1968	BS	Former president of the Cooper Union	
Albert Carnesale	1961	MS	Former chancellor of the University of California, Los Angeles and former provost of Harvard University	
Robert Croneberger	1962	MS	Librarian, one of American Libraries' "100 of the Most Important Leaders We Had in the 20th Century"	
Eli Fromm	1962 1964	BS MS	Gordon Prize-winning research professor of engineering at Drexel University	
Jiang Mianheng	1991	PhD	Former president of ShanghaiTech University, former vice president of Chinese Academy of Sciences	
Moshe Kam	1985 1987	MS PhD	49th president of IEEE and dean of the New Jersey Institute of Technology	
Raphael Carl Lee	1975	MS	Professor at the University of Chicago, surgeon, and 1981 MacArthur Fellow	
Peter J. Liacouras	1953	BS	Former president of Temple University	
Celestino Pennoni	1963 1966	BS MS	Former interim president of Drexel University 1994–1995 and 2009–2010	
Alia Sabur	2006	MS	Child prodigy and Guinness World Record holder for "World's Youngest Professor"	
Elizabeth Gray Vining	1925	BS	Former tutor to Emperor Akihito of Japan	

=== Medicine and health ===
The Drexel University College of Medicine retroactively considers graduates from all of the medical institutes that it has acquired to be alumni of the College of Medicine and Drexel University. This includes MCP Hahnemann University (1993–2002), Woman's Medical College of Pennsylvania (1850–1993), and Hahnemann Medical College of Philadelphia (1848–1993).

DUCOM – Drexel University College of Medicine
HMC – Hahnemann Medical College
MCP – Medical College of Pennsylvania
WMCP – Woman's Medical College of Pennsylvania

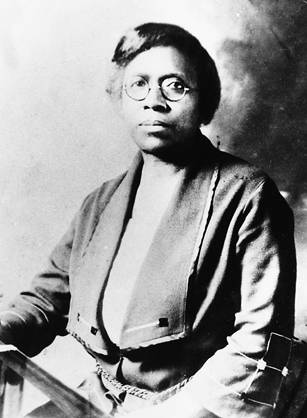
Matilda Evans, class of 1897

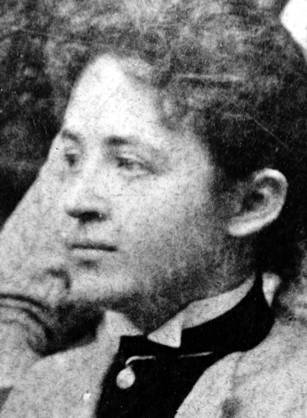
Kate Campbell Hurd-Mead, class of 1888

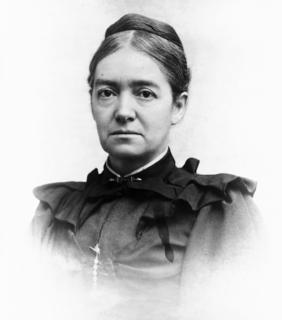
Mary Corinna Putnam Jacobi, class of 1864

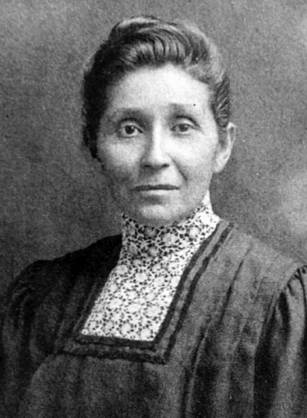
Susan La Flesche Picotte, class of 1889

Name	Grad year	Degree	College	Notability	Ref(s)
Annie Lowrie Alexander	1884	MD	WMCP	First licensed female physician in the Southern United States	
Isaac Ambrose Barber	1872	MD	HMC	Physician and former Republican member of the United States House of Representatives from Maryland	
Rose Mary Hatem Bonsack	1960	MD	MCP	Physician, former Maryland delegate for Harford County, Maryland	
Myrtelle Canavan	1905	MD	WMCP	One of the first female pathologists; namesake of Canavan disease	
LeRoy Carhart	1973	MD	HMC	Physician who participated in the Supreme Court cases Stenberg v. Carhart and Gonzales v. Carhart	
Deni Carise	1993	PhD		Researcher in clinical psychology and psychiatry; consultant and public speaker	
Rebecca Cole	1867	MD	WMCP	Second African-American woman to become a physician in the U.S.	
Matilda Evans	1897	MD	WMCP	First African-American woman licensed to practice medicine in South Carolina	
Nancy E. Gary	1962	MD	WMCP	Executive vice president of the Uniformed Services University of the Health Sciences and dean of its F. Edward Hébert School of Medicine	
Harold Griffith	1923	MD	HMC	Canadian anesthesiologist who introduced the use of ethylene and cyclopropane in anesthesiology	
Stuart Hameroff	1973	MD	HMC	Professor at the University of Arizona known for his study of consciousness	
Lillie Rosa Minoka Hill	1899	MD	WMCP	Second female Native American physician	
Mady Hornig	1988	MD	MCP	Psychiatrist and associate professor of epidemiology at Columbia University	
Kate Campbell Hurd-Mead	1888	MD	WMCP	Obstetrician and author of A History of Women in Medicine: From the Earliest of Times to the Beginning of the Nineteenth Century	
Mary Corinna Putnam Jacobi	1864	MD	WMCP	First woman to become a member of the Académie Nationale de Médecine	
Halle Tanner Dillon Johnson	1891	MD	WMCP	First female African-American physician in Alabama	
Anandi Gopal Joshi	1886	MD	WMCP	Second Indian female physician to earn a medical degree through training in Western medicine	
Gurubai Karmarkar	1893	MD	WMCP	Medical Marathi Christian missionary in India	
Kenneth S. Kosik	1976	MD	MCP	Author and researcher in neuroscience	
Jennifer S. Lawton	1992	MD	DUCOM	Thoracic surgeon, professor, and researcher	
Sandra Lee	1998	MD	MCP	Dermatologist also known as "Dr. Pimple Popper" who gained popularity for her YouTube channel	
Gary K. Michelson	1975	MD	HMC	Spinal surgeon and inventor	
Mary I. O'Connor	1985	MD	MCP	First director of the Center for Musculoskeletal Care at the Yale School of Medicine	
Susan La Flesche Picotte	1889	MD	WMCP	First female Native American physician	
Joseph H. Romig	1896	MD	HMC	Physician and one-term mayor of Anchorage, Alaska in 1937	
Jameela Al Salman		Medicine residency	Hahnemann University	Associate professor	
Ellis Reynolds Shipp	1883	MD	WMCP	One of the first female physicians in Utah	
David Shulkin	1986	MD	MCP	Secretary of Veterans Affairs	
J. Howard Swick	1906	MD	HMC	Physician and former Republican member of the United States House of Representatives from Pennsylvania	
Augustin Thompson	1867	MD	HMC	Physician and creator of Moxie	
Walter Van Fleet	1880	MD	HMC	Horticulturist known for rose cultivars; physiologist for the federal Department of Agriculture	
Robert J. Wicks	1977	PhD	HMC	Clinical psychologist and author	
Victoria Zdrok	1997 2003	MA PhD	DUCOM	Model and sex columnist	

=== Politics and public service ===
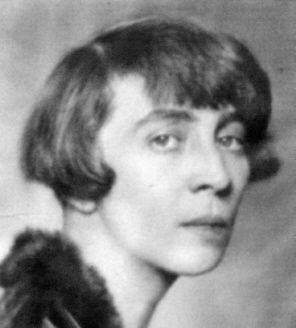
Ruth Hale, Class of 1916

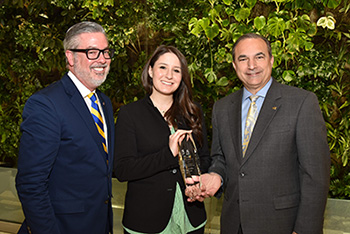
Victoria Napolitano, Class of 2010, with Drexel President John Fry and Alumni Board Chair Tony Noce

Name	Grad year	Degree	Notability	Ref(s)
Gary R. Chiusano	1973	BS	New Jersey General Assembly assemblyman for the 24th legislative district	
Erica Deuso			Mayor of Downingtown, Pennsylvania; first openly transgender mayor of Pennsylvania	
Ruth Hale	1916	—	Worked for women's rights in 1920s; member of the Algonquin Round Table	
Malcolm Kenyatta	2021	MS	Pennsylvania state representative for the 181st district	
Amara Mohamed Konneh	1999	BS	Former minister of Finance of Liberia	
Earle I. Mack	1959	BS	Former United States ambassador to Finland, partner of the Mack Company, and film producer	
Albert Branson Maris	1926	BS	Federal judge on the United States Court of Appeals for the Third Circuit	
William H. Milliken Jr.	—	—	United States congressman from Pennsylvania's 7th Congressional district 1959–1965	
Peter Mafany Musonge	1967	BS	Former prime minister of Cameroon	
Victoria Napolitano	2010	BS, MS	Youngest female mayor in New Jersey history; youngest mayor of Moorestown, New Jersey	
Peter O'Keefe		MBA	Member of the Pennsylvania House of Representatives, District 161 1975–1978	
Alassane Ouattara	1965	BS	Current president of Côte d'Ivoire	
Arthur Raymond Randolph	1966	BS	Federal judge on the United States Court of Appeals for the District of Columbia Circuit	
John Roberts Reading	1966	BS	Member of the U.S. House of Representatives from Pennsylvania	
Celeste Riley	2002	MS	New Jersey General Assembly assemblywoman for the 3rd legislative district	
Lindsay Walters	2007	BS	White House deputy press secretary under Donald Trump	
Lawrence G. Williams	—	—	United States congressman from Pennsylvania's 7th Congressional district 1966–1975	

=== Science and engineering ===
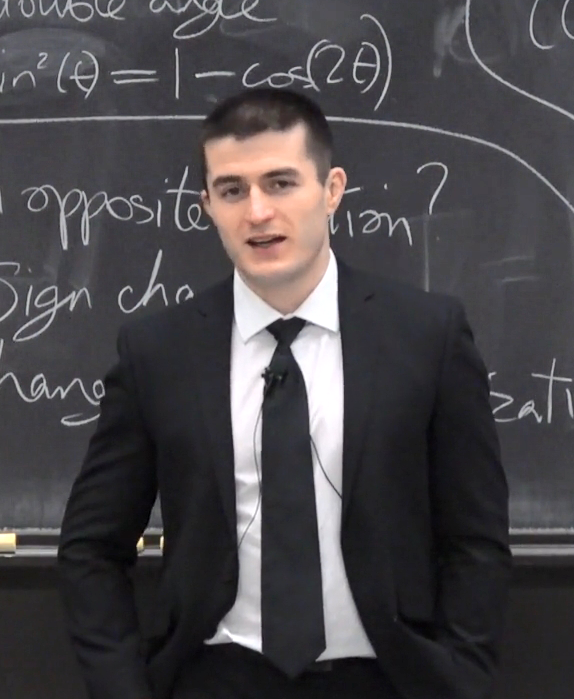
Lex Fridman, Class of 2014

Name	Grad year	Degree	Notability	Ref(s)
Sirous Asgari	1997	PhD	Developer of lithium ion battery materials; central in a court case against the US government	
Paul Baran	1949	BS	One of the inventors of packet switching and a founding father of the Internet	
Michael Behe	1974	BS	Biochemist and leading advocate of the pseudoscientific principle of intelligent design	
John C. Browne	1965	BS	Former director of the Los Alamos National Laboratory	
Samuel P. De Bow Jr.	1976	BS	Former rear admiral in the National Oceanic and Atmospheric Administration Commissioned Corps, and its director 2003–2007	
Bruce Eisenstein	1965	MS	38th president of the Institute of Electrical and Electronics Engineers	
Lex Fridman	2014	BS, MS, PhD	Artificial intelligence researcher at Massachusetts Institute of Technology	
David H. Geiger	—	BS	Architect and engineer who invented the air-supported fabric roof system used in domed stadiums	
Walter Golaski	1946	BS	Developer of the first practical artificial blood vessel replacement	
Harry Gold	1936	Cert	Laboratory chemist; convicted of being the courier for a number of Soviet spy rings during the Manhattan Project	
John Gruber	1996	BS	Creator of the computer markup language Markdown and the website Daring Fireball	
Jon Hall	1973	BS	Board chair for the Linux Professional Institute	
Vasant Honavar	1984	MS	Director, Pennsylvania State University Center for Big Data Analytics and Discovery Informatics	
Moshe Kam	1985 1987	MS PhD	49th president of the Institute of Electrical and Electronics Engineers	
Lin Bin	1992	MS	Co-founder and president of Xiaomi, a member of the board of advisors at Tufts University School of Engineering	
Bruce E. Maryanoff	1969 1972	BS PhD	Medicinal and organic chemist responsible for the drug Topiramate	
Cynthia A. Maryanoff	1972	BS	Organic and biomaterials chemist; winner of two American Chemical Society National Awards	
Arlene Minkiewicz	1988	MS	Chief scientist at PRICE Systems	
James G. Nell	1961	BS	Engineer and systems integrator	
Hsieh Shou-shing	1980	MS	Former minister of the Nuclear Safety Commission	
Bernard Silver	1947	BS	Early developer of barcode technology with Norman Joseph Woodland	
Norman Joseph Woodland	1947	BS	Inventor of barcode technology	

==== NASA ====
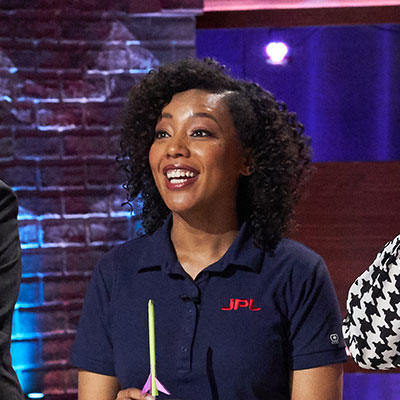
Moogega Cooper, class of 2009

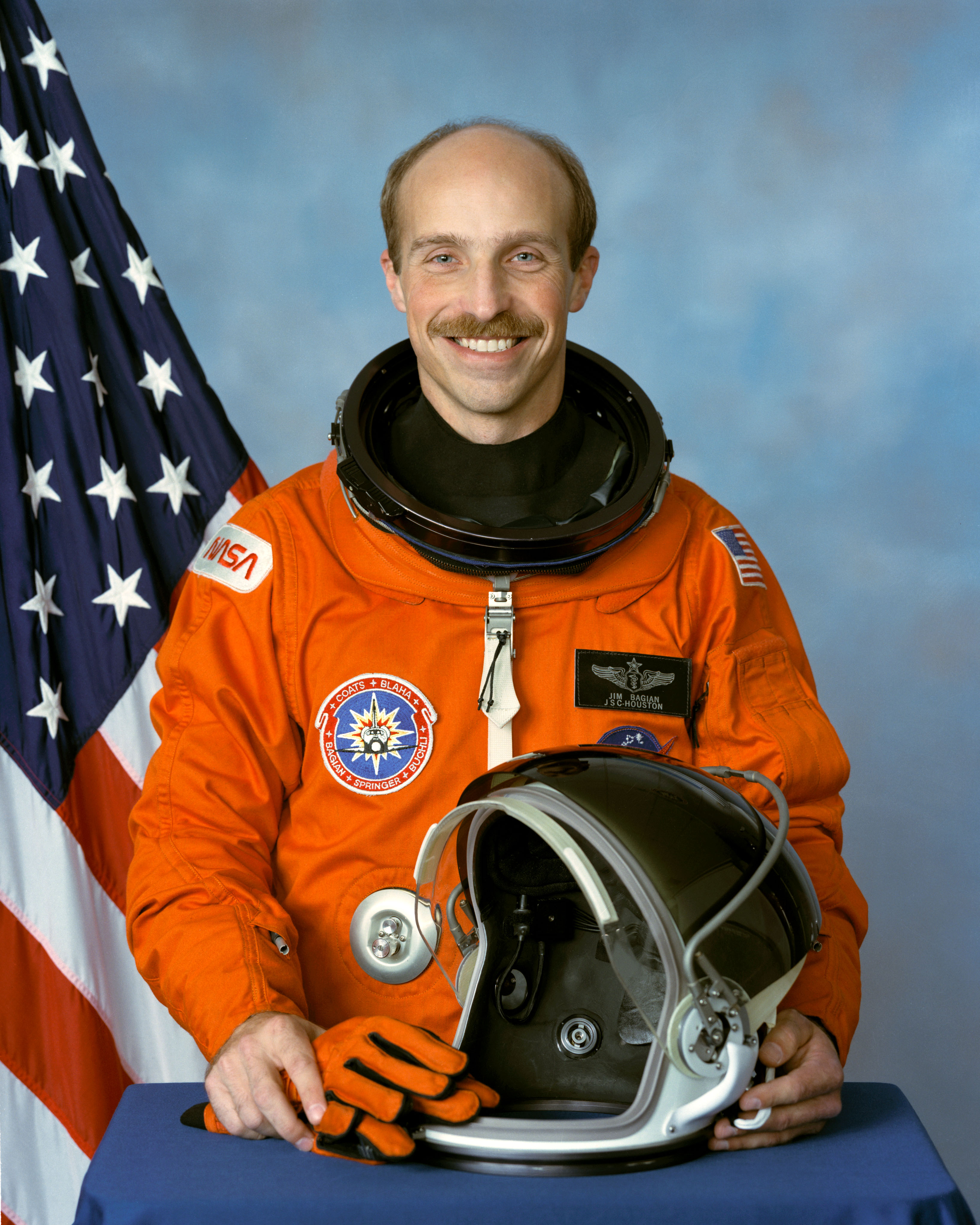
James P. Bagian, class of 1973

Name	Grad year	Degree	Notability	Ref(s)
James P. Bagian	1973	BS	Astronaut, physician, colonel in the United States Air Force Reserves, and the pararescue flight surgeon for the 939th Air Rescue Wing	
Padi Boyd	1993	PhD	Astrophysicist, head of NASA's Exoplanets and Stellar Astrophysics Laboratory and an Associate Director at the Goddard Space Flight Center	
Moogega Cooper	2009	PhD	Astronomer, lead of Planetary Protection for the Mars 2020 Mission	
Christopher Ferguson	1984	BS	Astronaut and pilot	
Pete Frank	—	MS	NASA engineer who served as the lead flight director for the Apollo 14 and Apollo 16 crewed lunar landing missions	
Paul W. Richards	1987	BS	Astronaut and mechanical engineer	
Patricia Robertson	1989	MD	Astronaut and physician	

=== Sports ===
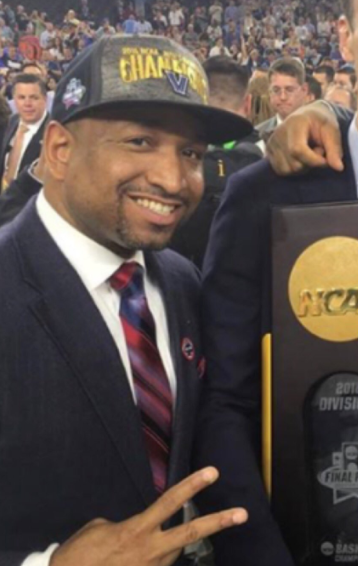
Ashley Howard, Class of 2004

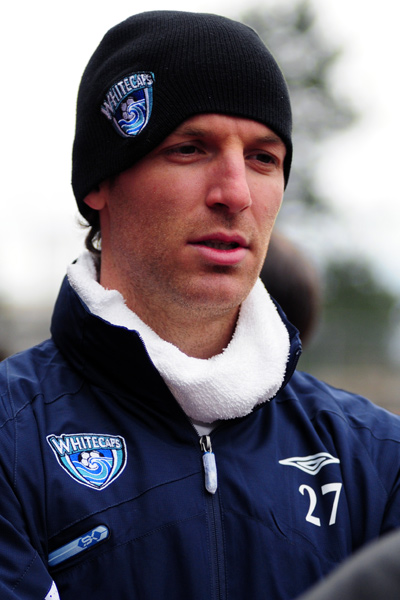
Jeff Parke, class of 2003

Name	Grad year	Degree	Notability	Ref(s)
Michael Anderson	1988	BS	Former NBA player with the San Antonio Spurs	
Justin Best	2019	BS	Olympic rower	
Brent Bommentre	—	—	Ice dancer, 2008 Four Continents bronze medalist and two-time (2008 & 2009) U.S. national bronze medalist	
Jim Casciano	1977	BS	Men's basketball head coach at the New Jersey Institute of Technology	
J. R. Castle	—	—	Former lacrosse player with the Philadelphia Wings	
Robert Church	2013	BS	Lacrosse player; fifth overall pick in the 2013 National Lacrosse League Entry Draft	
Austin DeSanto	—	—	Wrestler; four-time NCAA All-American; RAF Bantamweight Champion	
Mark Gerban	2003	BS	Represented the Palestinian Rowing Federation at the 2005–2007 World Rowing Championships, 16th-place finish and highest world championship result of any Palestinian athlete	
Tom Grebis	1954	—	Former football coach at Drexel	
Ashley Howard	2004	BA	College basketball coach; assistant coach at Villanova 2013–2018; head coach at La Salle 2018–2022	
Damion Lee	2015	BS	NBA player with the Atlanta Hawks and the Golden State Warriors	
Eric Lynch	2013	BS	2009 Wendy's Heisman nominee, soccer	
Zach Makovsky	2006	BS	Wrestler; professional mixed martial arts fighter; formerly competed in the Ultimate Fighting Championship	
Gabriela Mărginean	2010	BS	Women's National Basketball Association player formerly with the Minnesota Lynx	
Frank Masley	1989	BS	Luger; Olympic flag-bearer for USA in the 1984 Olympic opening ceremonies	
Bashir Mason	2007	BS	Hired as basketball head coach at Wagner College beginning in March 2012; was a four-year starter for Drexel while attending school	
Virginia Halas McCaskey	1943	BBA	Football executive, owner of the Chicago Bears of the National Football League (NFL)	
Ben McIntosh	2014	BBA	Lacrosse player with the Philadelphia Wings; first overall pick in the 2015 National Lacrosse League Entry Draft	
Travis Mohr	2004	BS	Gold and silver medal winner in swimming events at the 2004 Summer Paralympics, holds one world record	
Jim Ostendarp	—	—	Former NFL player with the New York Giants; collegiate football and wrestling coach	
Jeff Parke	2003	—	Professional soccer player with the Seattle Sounders FC and previously with the Vancouver Whitecaps FC and New York Red Bulls	
Malik Rose	1996	BS	Former NBA player with the Charlotte Hornets, the San Antonio Spurs, the New York Knicks, and the Oklahoma City Thunder	
Fox Stanton	—	—	Former collegiate football coach	
John Szefc	1989	BA	College baseball coach at Marist and Maryland	
Amari Williams	2024	BA	NBA player with the Boston Celtics	
