= Drexel University School of Public Health =

Public University in Pennsylvania

Coordinates: 39.95689°N 75.16445°W

Drexel University Dornsife School of Public Health
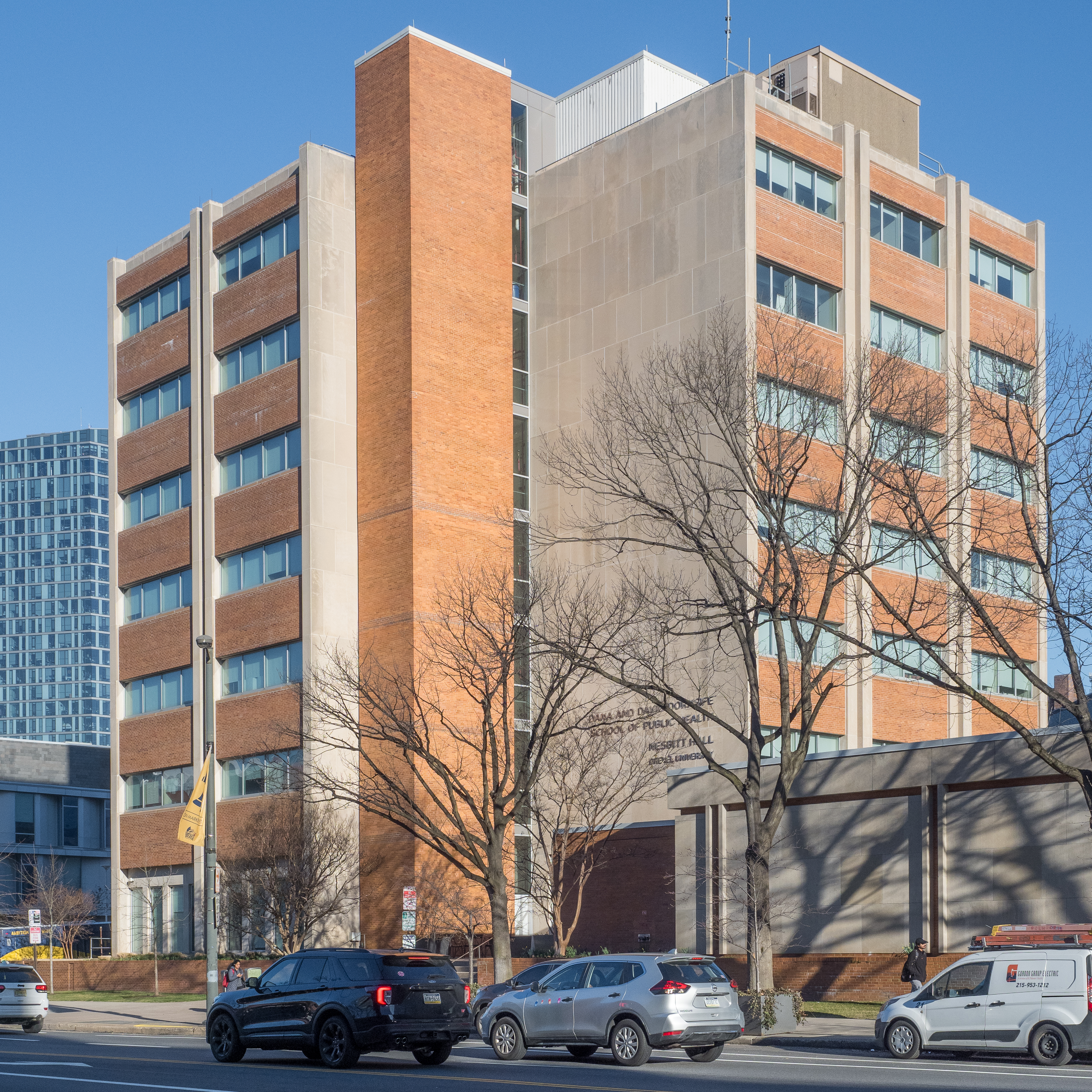
- Nesbitt Hall
- Motto: Public Health, Human Rights
- Established: 1996
- Affiliations: Drexel University
- Dean: Gina Lovasi, MPH, PhD
- Location: Philadelphia, Pennsylvania, USA
- Campus: University City Campus
- Website: http://drexel.edu/dornsife/

The Drexel University Dornsife School of Public Health is a part of the Drexel University Health Sciences network of schools. The Dornsife School of Public Health was located in downtown Philadelphia from its inception until December 2013. It has since re-located to the University City Campus.

The Dornsife School of Public Health was founded in 1996, with Jonathan Mann as its first dean. In 2000, the School came under the operational management of Drexel University and in 2002 fully joined the university's Health Sciences network, where it was physically located until early 2014 within the Center City Hahnemann Campus, alongside the Drexel University College of Medicine and the Drexel University College of Nursing and Health Professions. In mid-January 2014, the school moved into the renovated Nesbitt Hall building, located in the University City Campus. The building used to house the Antoinette Westphal College of Media Arts and Design. In September 2015, the School received a $45 million gift from longtime philanthropists Dana and David Dornsife, in recognition of which the School was named after the donors.

== Departments ==
The School's academic program contains the following four departments and two programs:

- Community Health and Prevention Department
- Environmental and Occupational Health Department
- Epidemiology and Biostatistics Department
- Health Management and Policy Department
- Urban Health Program
- Global Health Program

== Degrees ==
The School currently offers the following CEPH-accredited degree programs:

- Bachelor's of Science (BS) in Public Health
- Bachelor's of Science (BS) in Health Data Analytics
- Bachelor's of Arts (BA) in Global Health
- Bachelor's + Master of Public Health (MPH) 4+1 Program
- Master of Public Health (MPH)
- Master of Public Health, Executive Program (Executive MPH)
- Master of Science (MS) in Biostatistics
- Master of Science (MS) in Epidemiology
- Master of Science (MS) in Global Health
- Master of Science (MS) in Infection Prevention and Control
- Doctor of Public Health (DrPH) in Health Management and Policy
- Doctorate (PhD) in Epidemiology
- Doctorate (PhD) in Health Services Research and Policy
- Doctorate (PhD) in Biostatistics
- Doctorate (PhD) in Community Health and Prevention
- Doctorate (PhD) in Environmental and Occupational Health
- Joint Doctor of Medicine and Master of Public Health (MD/MPH)
- Joint Juris Doctor and Master of Public Health (JD/MPH)
