= Visco =

Visco may refer to:

== People ==
- Amanda Visco (born 1997), American soccer player
- Chris Visco (1971–2023), American cannabis industry businesswoman
- Ignazio Visco (born 1949), Italian economist and Governor of the Bank of Italy
- Vincenzo Visco (born 1942), Italian politician and economist who has served as a government minister
- Visco Grgich (1923–2005), American National Football League player

== Other uses ==
- Visco, Friuli, Italy, a comune (municipality) in the province of Udine
- Visco Corporation, a video game developer
- Visco Flying Service, original name of Imperial Airlines, a defunct American commuter airline
- Visco fuse, a higher quality fuse used for consumer fireworks

== See also ==
- Viscos, a French commune in the Hautes-Pyrénées department
