= Drexel University Sacramento =

Coordinates: 38.580°N 121.506°W

- Motto: Scientiae, Industria, Arte
- Motto in English: Science, Industry, Art
- Type: Satellite campus of Drexel University
- Active: January 5th, 2009–2015
- Location: Sacramento, California, U.S.
- Colors: Blue and Gold
- Mascot: Dragon, "Mario the Magnificent"
- Website: drexel.edu/sacramento

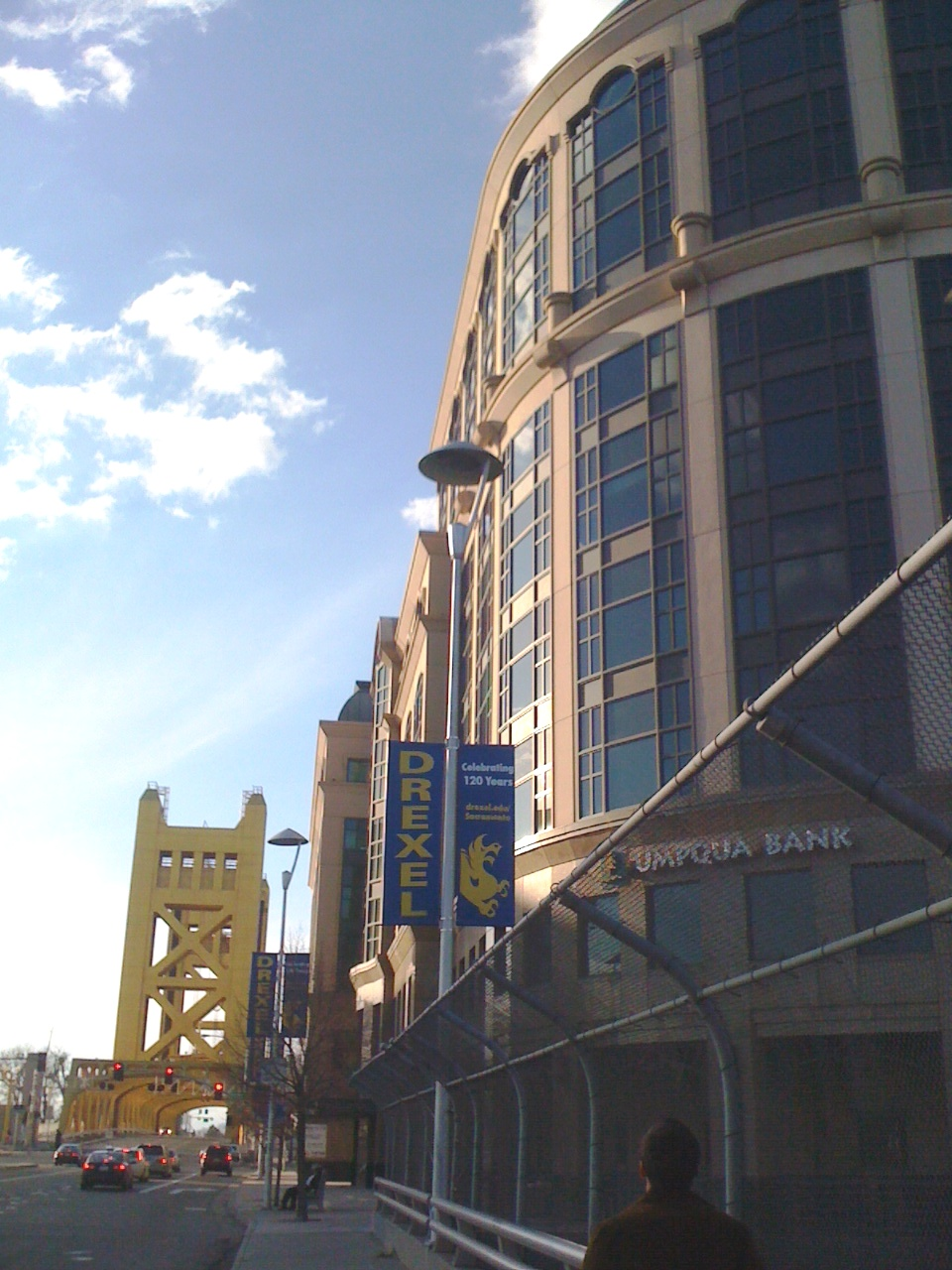
School facade, and the Tower Bridge over the Sacramento River

Drexel University Sacramento—DUS was a satellite campus of Drexel University, located in downtown Sacramento, California, United States. It was in Old Sacramento, beside the Tower Bridge over the Sacramento River. Drexel is a not-for-profit, private, research university based in Pennsylvania, with three campuses in Philadelphia. The Sacramento campus was opened in 2009 and closed in 2015 with students enrolled at that time allowed to complete their studies.

== History ==
Drexel University announced plans to open a Sacramento campus in May 2008.

The Drexel University Sacramento Center for Graduate Studies opened in Sacramento in January 2009.

In December 2010, the Center graduated the first cohort of 30 students with graduate degrees in Business and Higher Education. In June 2011, more than 100 students were eligible to participate in Drexel's first commencement ceremony outside of Philadelphia in its 120-year history.

Drexel University's Sacramento Center for Graduate Studies was renamed Drexel University Sacramento in November 2012 as a result of the institution's launch of a Bachelor of Science in Business Administration.

Drexel University began closing the Sacramento campus in spring 2015, although students enrolled as of the announcement of the closure were allowed to complete their studies. Some of the Drexel University Sacramento graduate degree programs transferred to the University of the Pacific.

== Partnership with Kaiser Permanente ==
In 2013, Drexel University's College of Medicine announced Partnership with Kaiser Permanente in California to help ensure a strong physician workforce for the future and to further develop emerging health care leaders for the Sacramento region. Third year medical students from the College of Medicine began a year of clinical rotations at Kaiser Permanente medical centers in Sacramento, South Sacramento, Roseville and Vallejo in pediatrics, obstetrics/gynecology, surgery, outpatient psychiatry, family medicine and adult medicine.

Students in the Drexel University Sacramento Interdepartmental Medical Science program were also provided opportunities to observe Kaiser Permanente's model of care through a unique 10-week physician shadowing program that was started in March 2011.

== Accreditation ==
Drexel University is accredited by the Middle States Association of Colleges and Schools. Other colleges accredited by this body include Cornell, Penn, and NYU.

In addition, Drexel programs are accredited by their respective top professional accreditation bodies, including the AACSB (Business), ABET (Engineering), ALA (Library Science), CIDA (Interior Design), CEPH (Public Health), and NLNAC (Nursing).

== See also ==
- Campuses of Drexel University
