= Herrick Corporation =

U.S.-based steel manufacturer

- Company type: Private
- Founded: 1921
- Headquarters: 3003 East Hammer Lane, Stockton, California, United States
- Number of locations: Stockton, San Bernardino, Texas, Mississippi, Thailand
- Key people: David H. Dornsife (Chairman)
- Products: Steel
- Number of employees: 2,000 (2011)
- Website: herricksteel.com

The Herrick Corporation is a steel corporation headquartered in Stockton, California, USA. The company has additional factories in San Bernardino, Texas, Mississippi, and Thailand.

== History ==
The Herrick Corporation was founded in 1921. The steel sold by the corporation was used to build many skyscrapers in Los Angeles and San Francisco.

As of 2011, the company had a workforce of 2,000. Its Chairman is David H. Dornsife.
