= Dana Dornsife =

American entrepreneur

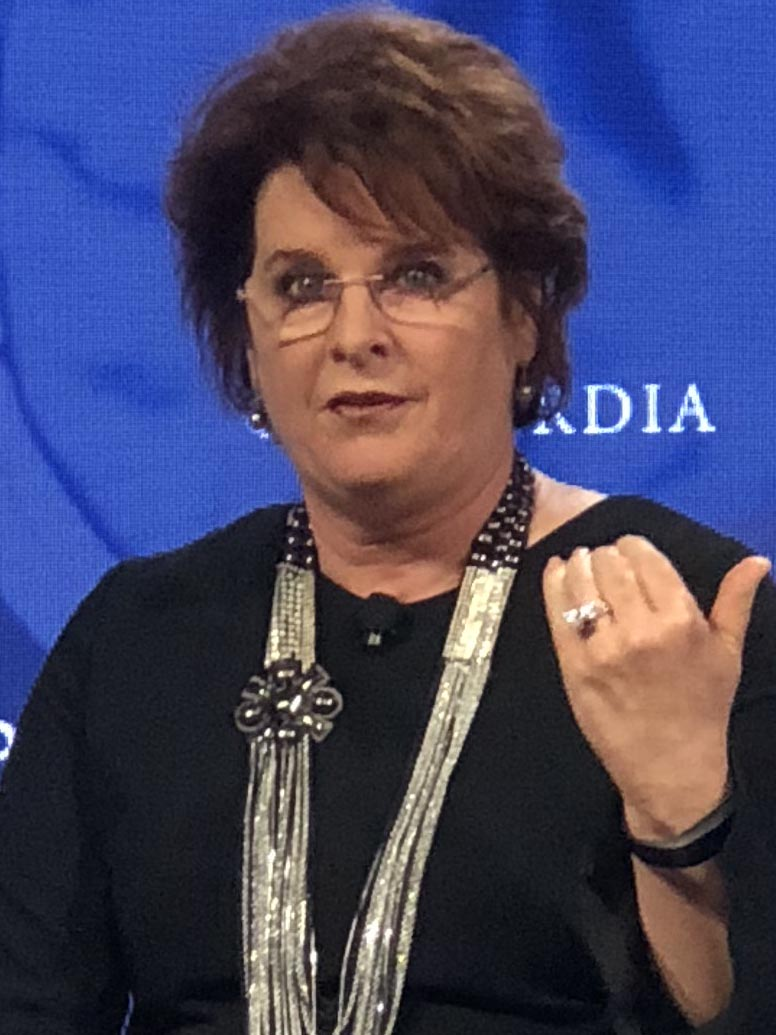
- Born: September 21, 1961 (age 64); Poughkeepsie, New York
- Education: Drexel University, John F. Kennedy University & Illuminating Engineering Society of North America
- Known for: Founder and CEO, Lazarex Cancer Foundation
- Spouse: David H. Dornsife

Dana Dornsife (born September 21, 1961, née L'Archevesque) is an American entrepreneur, patient-advocate and philanthropist in the areas of health care, education, the environment and social justice. She is the Founder and Chief Mission and Strategy Officer of Lazarex Cancer Foundation, a nationwide non-profit organization that helps advanced-stage cancer patients find and access treatment through Food and Drug Administration clinical trials. Dornsife and her husband, American businessman David H. Dornsife, are philanthropists who have donated hundreds of millions of dollars to charitable causes and were named among the nation’s Top 50 most generous donors in 2016 by The Chronicle of Philanthropy. The couple made the list of America's Top 50 Donors of 2020 as well according to Philanthropy 50, an annual ranking compiled by The Chronicle of Philanthropy. They ranked #27 for giving $59 million.

The couple are the world’s top investors in clean water projects in Africa. Their 2009 gift of $200 million US dollars to the University of Southern California (USC) was the largest single gift to the school in its history. They are the largest benefactor to Drexel University in that school’s history having donated more than $70 million US dollars, including $45 million in 2015 to the Drexel School of Public Health, which was named after them and $9 million in 2020 to help launch a Center on Racism and Health. Their 2020 gift of $10 million US dollars to Whitworth University was the single largest gift in that school's history.

== Early life ==
Dornsife was born in Poughkeepsie, New York. She received her bachelor’s degree in business from Drexel University, an Interior Design Certification from John F. Kennedy University and her Lighting Design Certification through the Illuminating Engineering Society of North America.

== Career ==
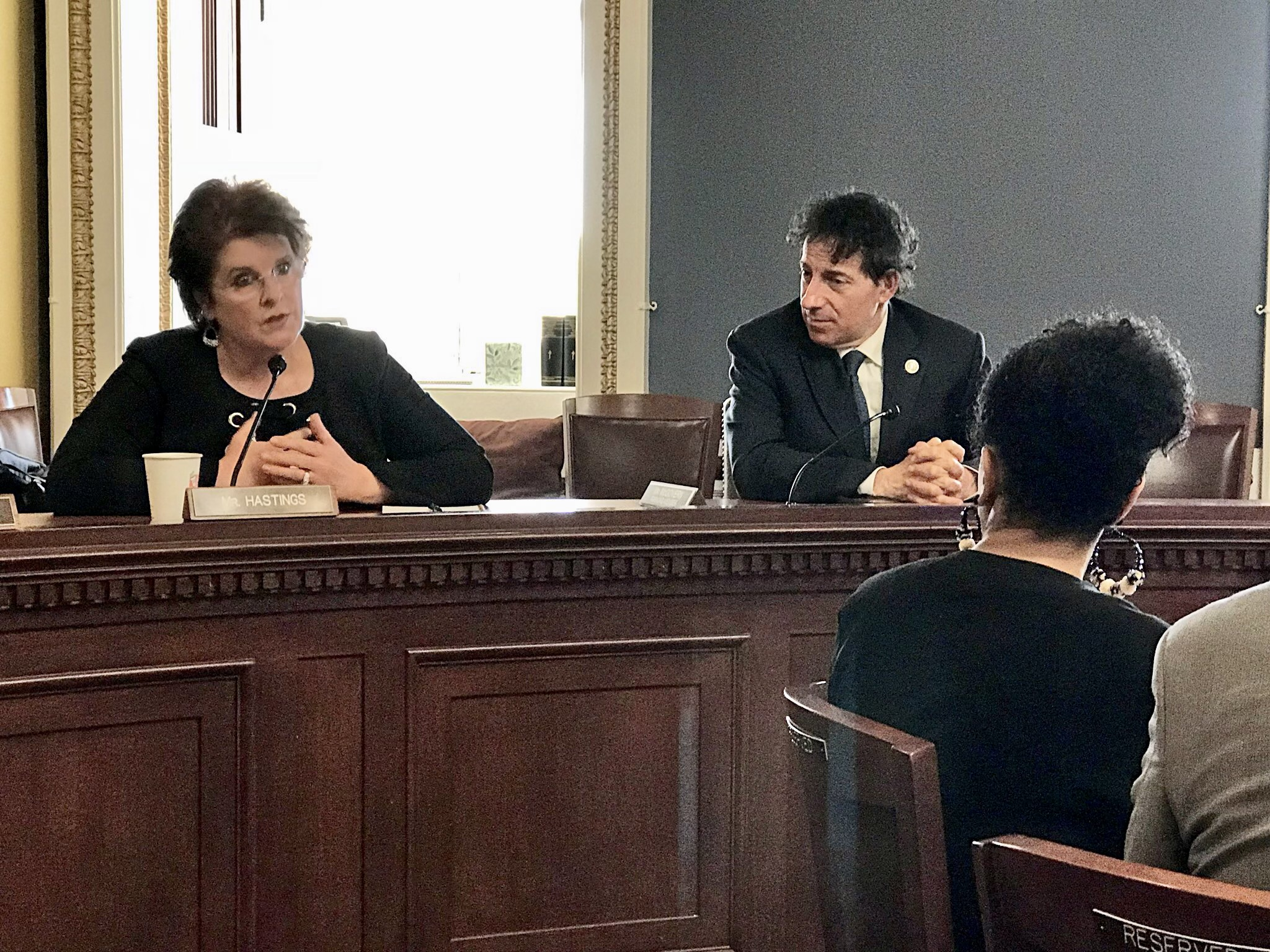
Dornsife in 2018

In 1991, Dornsife co-founded Axiom Design, Inc., a lighting design and architectural electronics consulting firm. In 2002 she founded Adorn, a lighting and interior design company. In 2006 she founded Lazarex Cancer Foundation after her brother-in-law was diagnosed with pancreatic cancer. The nationwide non-profit organization reimburses patients for travel costs associated with FDA clinical trial participation and helps advanced stage cancer patients and the medically underserved find clinical trial options. As Founder, Chief Mission and Strategy Officer of Lazarex, Dana was involved in getting the U.S. Food and Drug Administration to publish new guidance language ‘giving the green light to reimburse patients for travel expenses to clinical trial sites’ and she advocates at the state level for laws that reinforce the FDA guidance clarifying that patients can be reimbursed for travel expenses related to clinical trial participation. Dornsife currently serves as a board member of the University of Southern California (USC) Brain and Creativity Institute, Chair of the University of California, San Francisco (UCSF) Cancer Leadership Council and is a member of the Massachusetts General Hospital Presidents Council.

== Philanthropy ==
In 2009, Dornsife and her husband David H. Dornsife donated US $200 million to his alma mater, the University of Southern California. It was the largest single gift to the University in its history and the school’s College of Letters, Arts, and Sciences was re-named the USC Dana and David Dornsife College of Letters, Arts and Sciences. The donation provided support for the construction of a Brain and Creativity Institute and building. On March 23, 2011, USC gave the couple University Medallions, for major contributions to the University. The couple also received the USC College Dean’s Medallion for their commitment to innovation in 2005.

In 2015, the couple pledged US $45 million to the Drexel University School of Public Health at her alma mater and the school officially changed its name to the Drexel University Dornsife School of Public Health. Dornsife and her husband made the US $10 million lead gift to establish the Dornsife Center for Neighborhood Partnerships, a community-based resource center at Drexel University. She and her husband also pledged US $2.5 million to the Bennett S. LeBow College of Business at Drexel University and $1.5 million in 2015 to Whitworth University’s Center for Service-Learning and Community Engagement, which was re-named the Dana and David Dornsife Center for Community Engagement. In December 2020, Drexel University announced a $9 million gift from Dana and her husband to the University’s School of Public Health to help 'launch a new Center on Racism and Health, recruit and retain faculty experts on racial inequities in health and endow the deanship for public health'. Also in December 2020, Whitworth University announced Dana and David Dornsife made the largest, single donation in the school's history - $10 million - to improve undergraduate and graduate offerings, campus amenities and instruction.

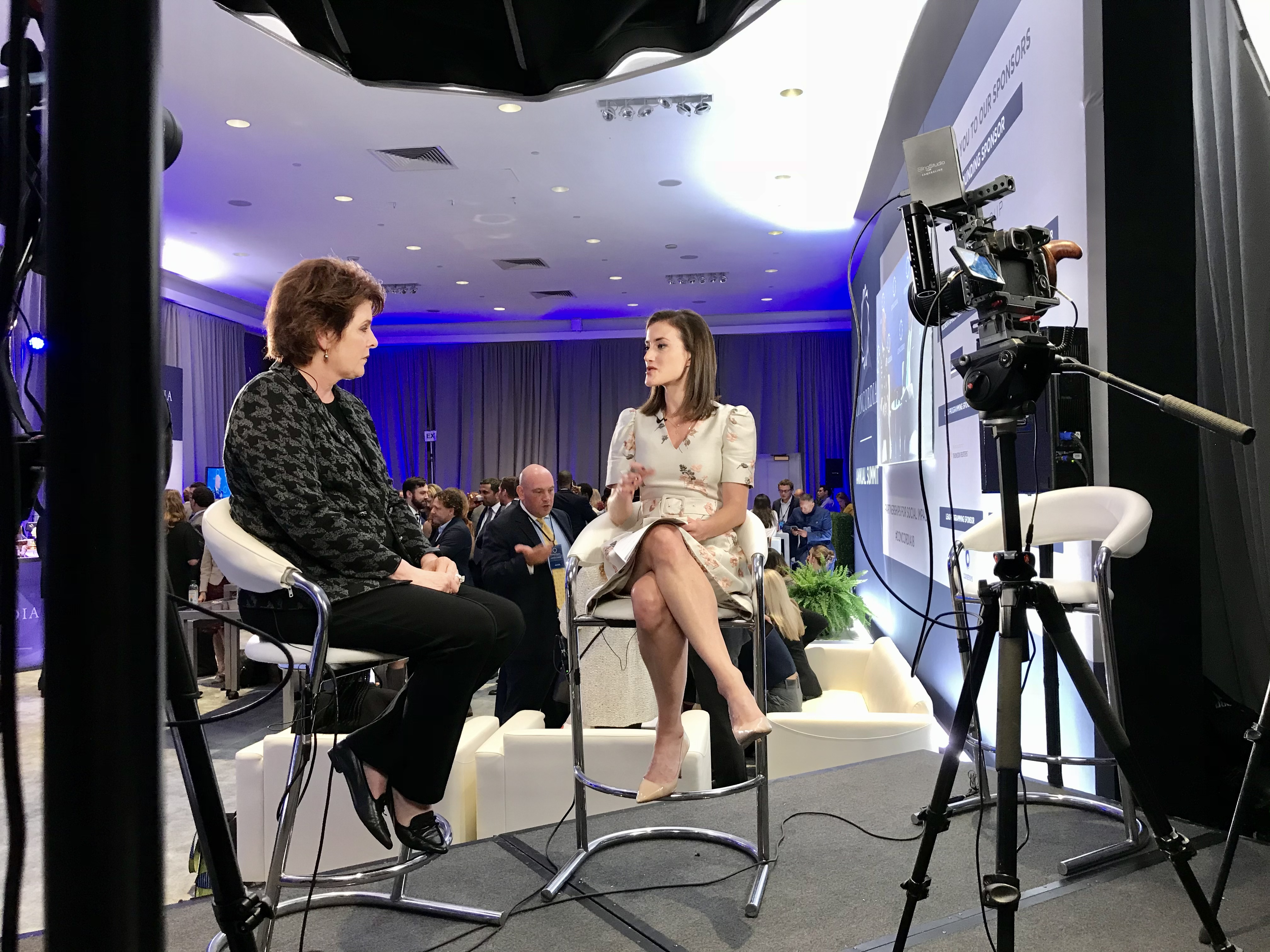

Dornsife and her husband are ‘one of the top private contributors to the water sector' in Africa. Through World Vision they supported 'microeconomic enterprise, agriculture and literacy programs in the Islamic Republic of Mauritania and, in partnership with the Conrad N. Hilton Foundation, well-water drilling in Mali, Ghana, Niger, Ethiopia, Zambia and Malawi. In 2015, Dornsife and her husband received the Water Warrior Award from World Vision for helping bring clean water, sanitation and hygiene to 20 million people since 1990.

She and her husband serve as Board and Council members of the Yosemite Conservancy, supported the Alzheimer’s Association Cerebrospinal Fluid Quality (CSF) Control Program, launched in 2009 'that brought world laboratories together to standardize the measurement potential of Alzheimer biomarkers in CSF' and they also work to expand agricultural production in Burkina Faso.

== Recognition ==
Dornsife received honorary degrees from USC in 2012 and Drexel University’s LeBow College of Business in 2014. In 2013 Whitworth University gave Dana and her husband honorary doctorates in humane letters ‘for their philanthropic and professional achievements’. Dana was the recipient of the Ellen Stoval Award for Innovation in Patient-Centered Cancer Care in 2019 and was named an ‘Agent of Change’ by Diablo Magazine in 2019 and a 2021 Threads of Hope Honoree. In 2023, Dornsife received the Champion for Cures Award from the Association of American Cancer Institutes.

== Personal life ==
Dornsife (née L'Archevesque) is married to David H. Dornsife. They have six children and reside in Danville, California.

== See also ==
- List of Drexel University alumni
