= Deni Carise =

American psychologist

Deni Carise is an American clinical psychologist, adjunct professor of psychiatry at the University of Pennsylvania and researcher in substance use disorder treatment.

== Education ==
Carise was educated at Drexel/Hahnemann University Hospital, Philadelphia, Pennsylvania, graduating with a B.S. in Mental Health Sciences in 1988 and a Ph.D. in Clinical Psychology in 1993.

She completed an internship in behavioral medicine at Homewood (part of Johns Hopkins University Health System) and Union Memorial Hospital, followed by a NIDA-Funded Post-Doctoral fellowship at the University of Pennsylvania’s Center for Studies of Addiction.

== Career ==
Between 1994 and 2010, Carise served as director of the Treatment Systems Research Section of the Treatment Research Institute, Philadelphia, Pennsylvania. She has been an adjunct professor of psychiatry at the University of Pennsylvania since 1996.

In 2013, she was consulted for Martin Scorsese’s The Wolf of Wall Street movie, coaching the cast acting under the influence of cocaine and Quaaludes. Recently, she provided expert information on heroin use, Narcan administration and the opioid epidemic for the film Sno Babies (2020).

She has been featured in segments on Nightline, MSNBC, Fox News, ABC, CBS, and NBC.

== Scholarly works ==
She has published over 100 scholarly articles, books, and chapters, ranging over a wide variety of topics on substance use disorder and its treatment. Further, her research has garnered over 1,975 citations.
