= David Kresh =

American poet

David Kresh (1940–2006) was an American poet with three published volumes of poetry. He also served as the reference specialist for poetry at the Library of Congress.

== Biography ==
David Benedict Georg Kresh was born in 1940, in the Bronx, New York. He became interested in poetry after his father read regularly to him from Walt Whitman's Leaves of Grass.

He graduated from Swarthmore College in 1961, with a degree in English. In 1966, he earned his master's degree in library and information science from Drexel University.

Kresh was married three times, the last marriage lasting for twenty years before his death of prostate cancer at age 66.

== Career ==
Kresh authored three poetry collections, including Turn Off or Use Opener, which was published posthumously in 2007, as well as the more minor works Bloody Joy: Love Poems (1981) and Sketches After Pete's Beer (1986). Turn Off or Use Opener won the 2005 Caryle Prize in Poetry. He served for thirty-eight years at the Library of Congress, retiring in 2004.

Kresh served from 1995 until his death on September 26, 2006, as the poet-in-residence at Capitol Hill Day School in Washington, D.C.
