= Arlene Minkiewicz =

Software engineer

Arlene F. Minkiewicz is the Chief Scientist at PRICE Systems, a company generally acknowledged as the earliest developer of parametric cost estimation software. She leads the cost research activity for the entire suite of cost estimating products that PRICE develops and maintains. Minkiewicz has over 25 years of experience designing and implementing cost models.

== History ==
In 1997 Minkiewicz contributed to the science of software measurement by proposing predictive object points (POPs) as a means of measuring three characteristics of object-oriented software (combined data and functions, object communication and reuse via software. Her research has been published in leading trade journals including Software Development; Crosstalk: The Journal of Defense Software Engineering, and the British Software Review. In 2002 Minkiewicz was named the Clyde Perry Parametrician of the Year by the International Society of Parametric Analysts. In 2004, her research into the cost implications of Commercial-Off-the-Shelf (COTS) software-based systems was recognized with best paper awards by the International Society of Parametric Analysts and The Society for Cost Estimating and Analysis (ISPA / SCEA). In 2012, ISPA / SCEA recognized Ms. Minkiewicz for excellence in the field of parametric cost estimation with the presentation of the Frank Freiman Award, the highest honor awarded by the society.

== Education ==
Minkiewicz holds a bachelor's degree in electrical engineering from Lehigh University, (Bethlehem, Pa.) and a master's in computer science from Drexel University, (Philadelphia, Pa).

== U.S. patent ==
On June 6, 2000, Minkiewicz (along with Bruce E. Fad) was awarded U.S. patent 6073107 for parametric software forecasting system and method, a parametric software estimating system that provides a class of user selectable size metrics.

== Speaker and industry commentator ==
Minkiewicz speaks frequently on subjects pertaining to cost estimating and measurement at professional conferences including the 21st Annual Systems and Software Technology Conference. She recently commented on how government organizations evolved from major software innovators to users of commercially developed applications for the publication Federal Computer Week.

== Books ==
Minkiewicz has been a contributing author on several books about parametric modeling. These include:

- The Unified Process Inception Phase : Best Practices for Implementing the UP by Scott W. Ambler and Larry Constantine, CMP Books
- Software Process Improvement: Metrics, Measurement and Process Modeling by Michael Haug, Eric W. Olsen, Lars Bergman, Editors: ISBN 3-540-41787-7
- Software Cost Estimation and Sizing Methods, Issues, and Guidelines by Shari Lawrence Pfleeger, ISBN 0-8330-3713-7
- Software Project Management For Software Assurance: A DACS State-Of-The-Art Report by Thomas McGibbon, Elaine Fedchak, and Robert Vienneau, Data Analysis Center for Software
- Systems Cost Engineering by Dale Shermon, ISBN 978-0-566-08861-2
