= David H. Dornsife =

- Born: David Harold Dornsife c. 1944
- Education: University of Southern California
- Occupations: Businessman, philanthropist
- Spouse: Dana Dornsife
- Children: 6
- Parent(s): Harold & Ester Dornsife

David H. Dornsife (born c. 1944) is an American businessman and philanthropist from California. He serves as the Chairman of the Herrick Corporation, a steel corporation. With his wife, Dana Dornsife, he donated US$200 million to his alma mater, the University of Southern California in Los Angeles, California, where the Dornsife College of Letters, Arts and Sciences was named in their honor. The Dornsifes also support charitable causes in Africa.

== Early life ==
David Harold Dornsife was born c. 1944. Both his parents, Harold Dornsife and Ester (née Peterson), graduated from the University of Southern California (USC) in Los Angeles, California; they were also generous donors.

Dornsife graduated with a Bachelor of Business Administration from the University of Southern California in 1965. At USC, he was a member of the Kappa Alpha Order fraternity.

== Career ==
Dornsife started his career at Granite Construction in Watsonville, California. He also worked for M.M. Sundt Construction in Tucson, Arizona.

Dornsife joined the Herrick Corporation, a steel corporation, in 1977. He serves as its chairman. Until 2008 he served as the Chairman of the Gillig Corporation, a manufacturer of transit buses.

== Philanthropy ==
Dornsife serves on the Board of Trustees of his alma mater, the University of Southern California. He also serves as chairman of the Board of the USC Brain and Creativity Institute. In 2011, Dornsife and his wife donated $200 million to USC. As a result, the College of Letters, Arts and Sciences was renamed in their honor. They also pledged US$2.5 million to the Bennett S. LeBow College of Business at Drexel University. In 2015, they pledged another $45 million to the Drexel University School of Public Health; in response, the school has officially changed its name to the Dornsife School of Public Health.

With his wife, Dornsife has made charitable contributions to World Vision, whereby they support bringing water, sanitation and hygiene to 25 countries in Africa. In 2016 they received a World Vision Water Warrior Award for helping to bring water, sanitation and hygiene to 10,066,000 people since 1990. Additionally, they serve as council members of Yosemite Conservancy.

In late 2021, Dana and David Dornsife donated $10 million to Whitworth University in Spokane, Washington to fund the Dana & David Dornsife Health Sciences Building. This state-of-the-art 38,000 square-foot new facility will house Whitworth's Doctor of Physical Therapy (DPT), Doctor of Occupational Therapy (OTD), and Master of Science (MS) in Athletic Training graduate degree programs.

== Personal life ==
David Dornsife is married to Dana Dornsife (née L'Archevesque), an interior designer and philanthropist. Dana is also the president and founder of Lazarex Cancer Foundation, a non-profit organization that helps advanced-stage cancer patients find and access treatment through FDA clinical trials. They have six children and reside in Danville, California.
