= Campus of Drexel University =

University grounds in Philadelphia, Pennsylvania

Coordinates: 39.95388°N 75.18691°W

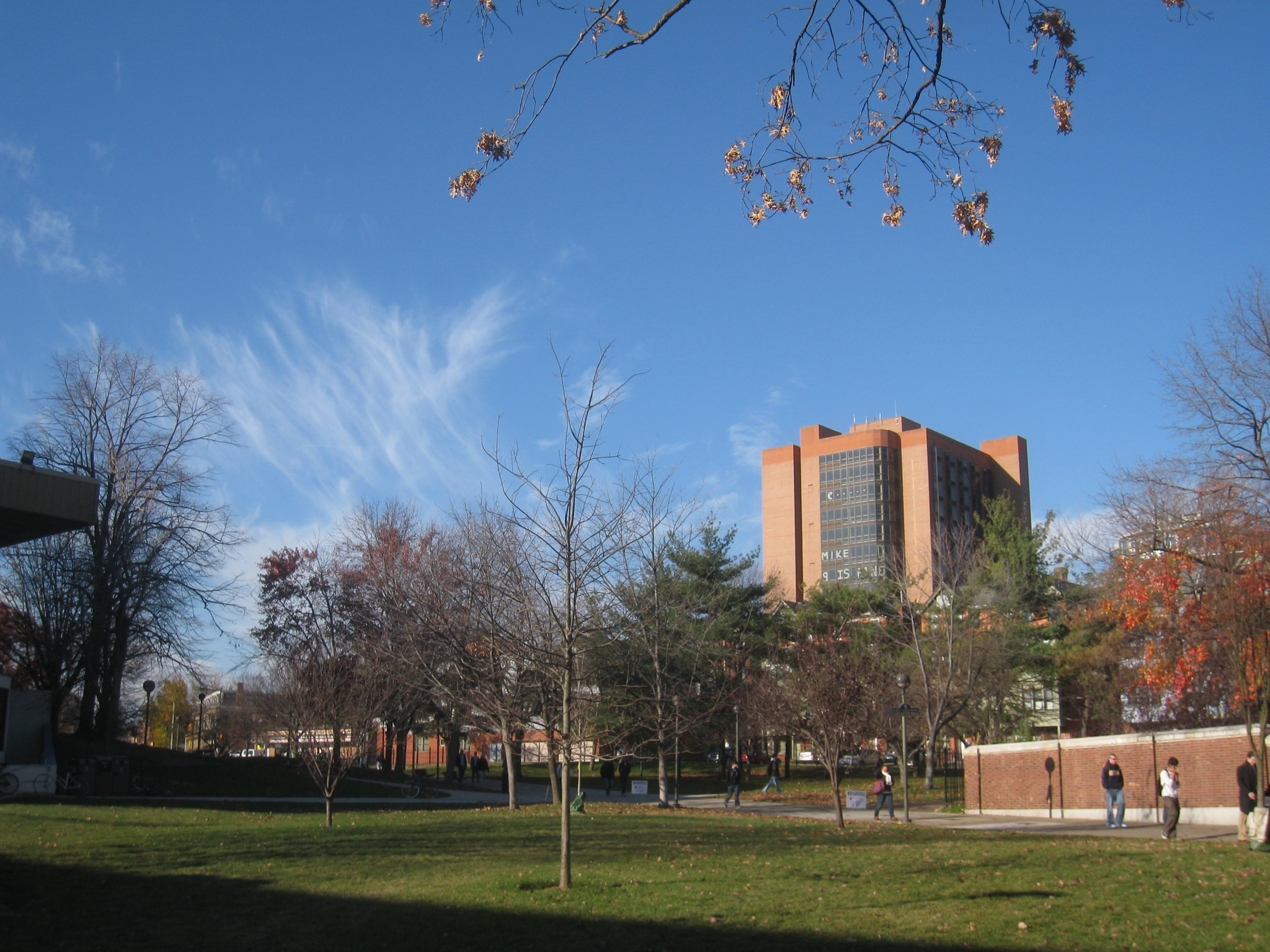
University City Main Campus, West Philadelphia

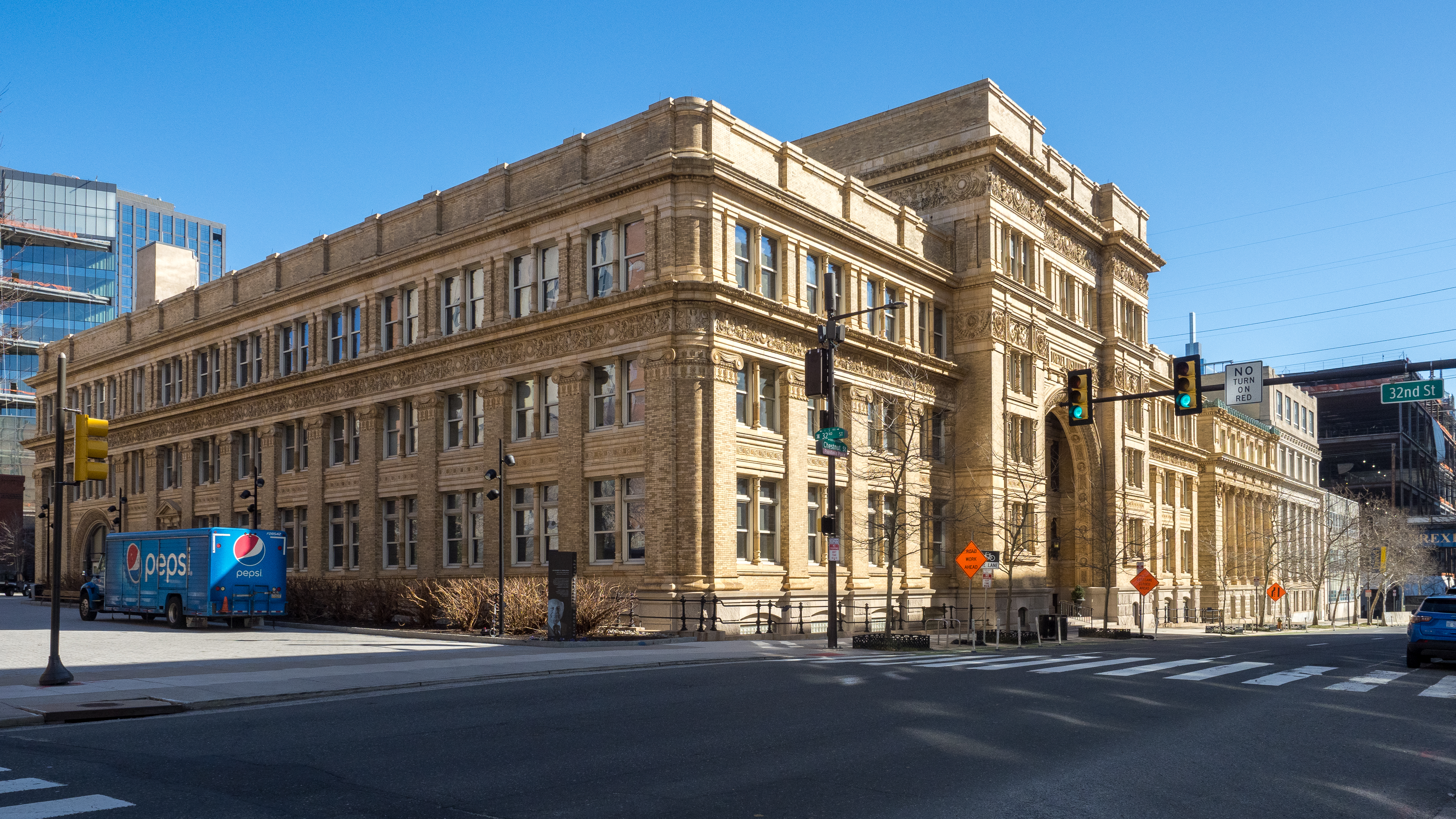
The Main Building, dedicated in 1891

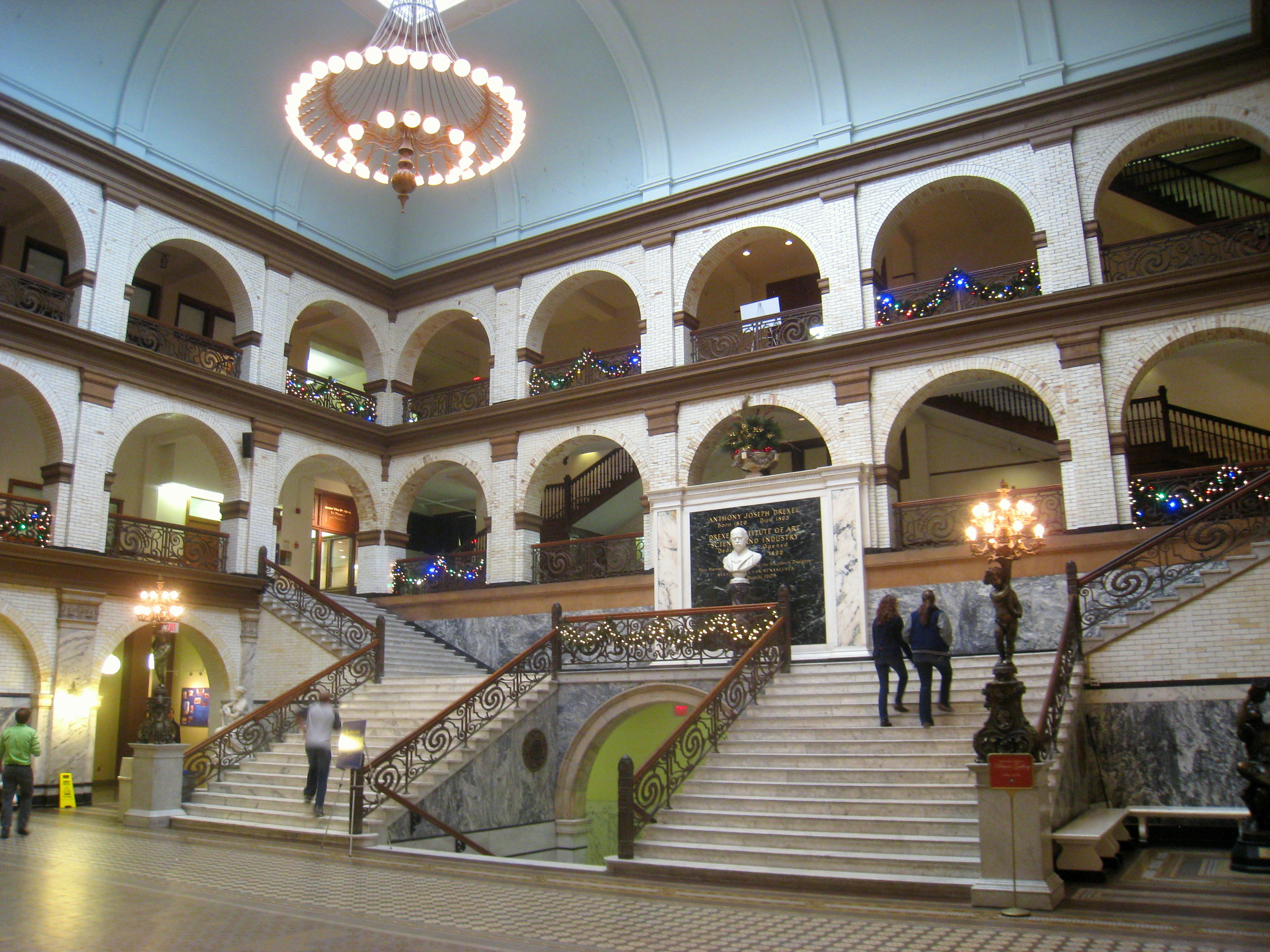
Interior courtyard of the Main Building

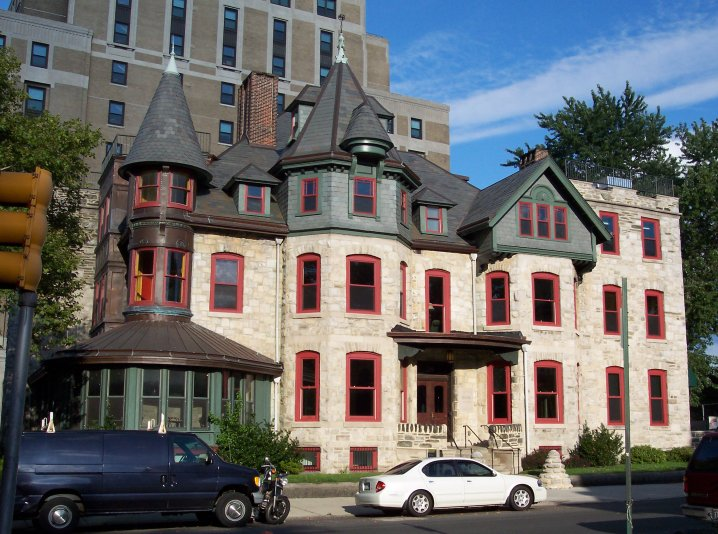
Drexel Ross Commons

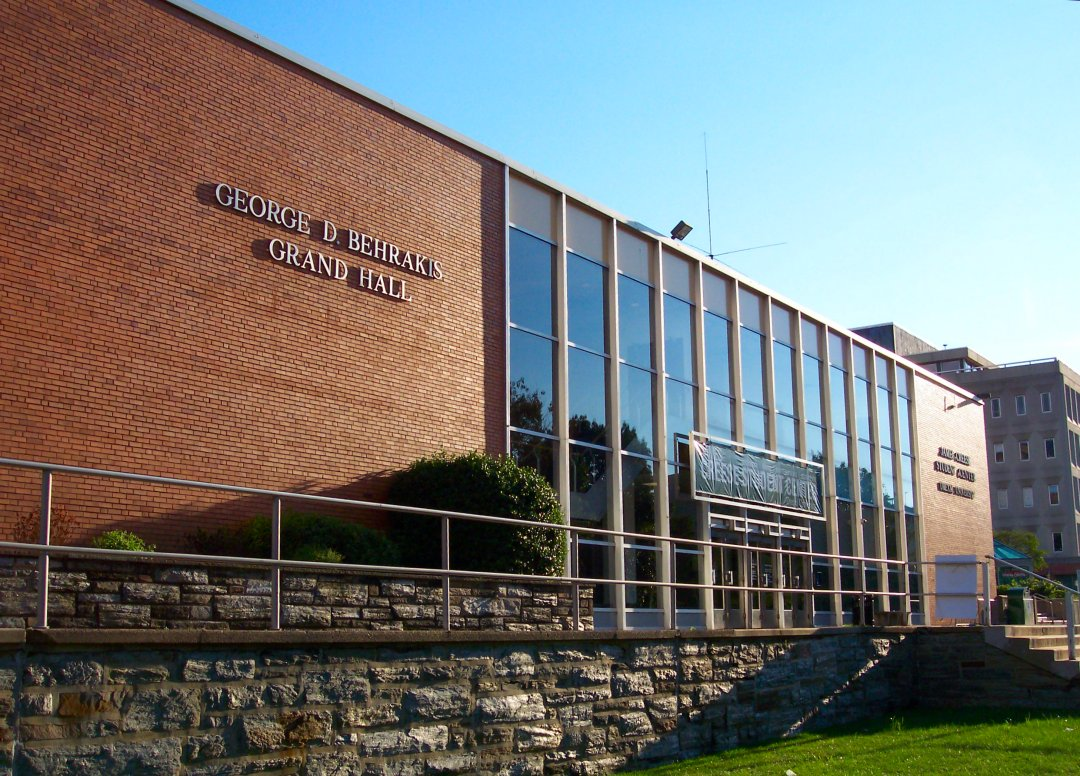
Drexel Creese Student Center

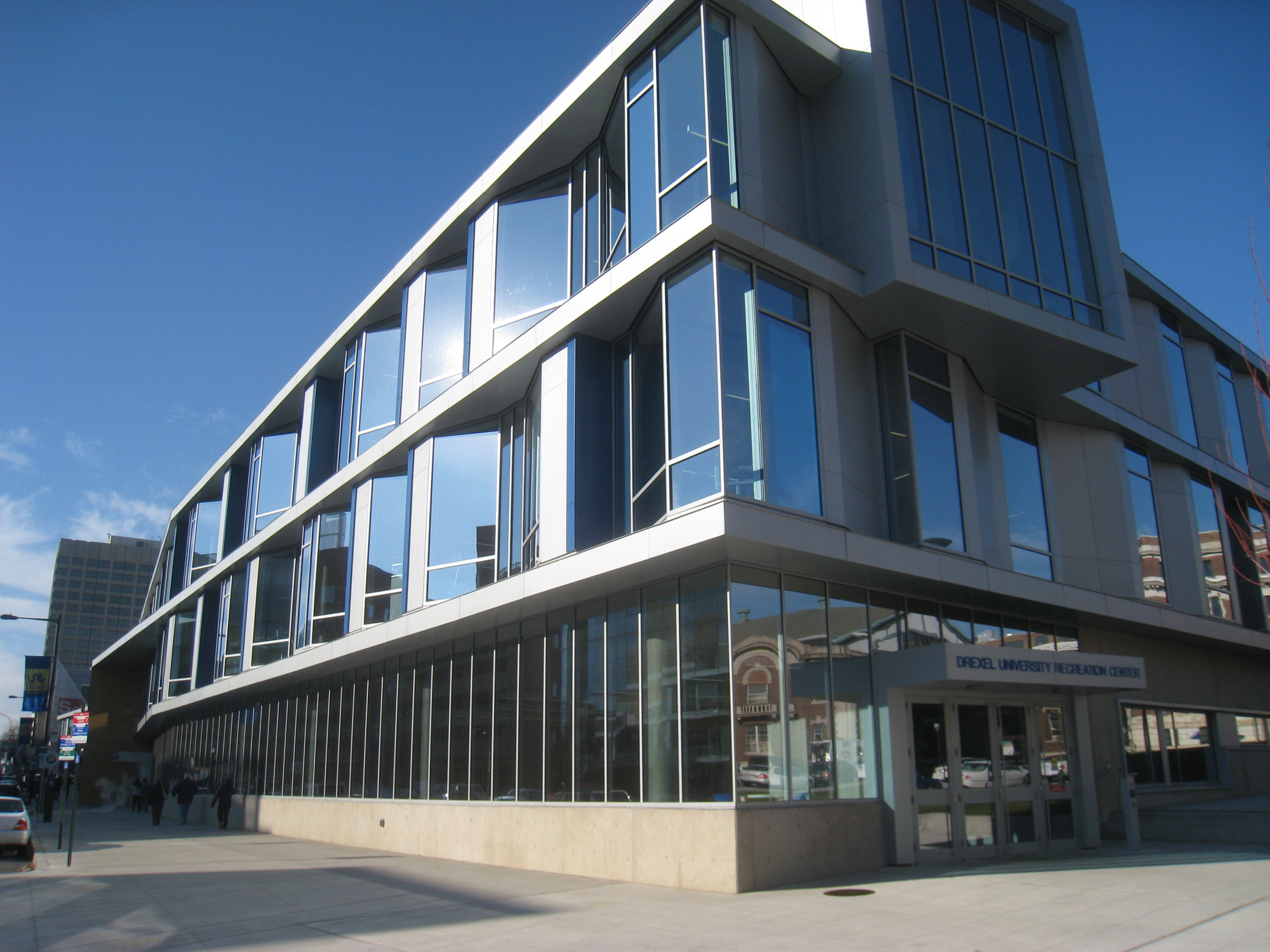
Drexel Recreation Center

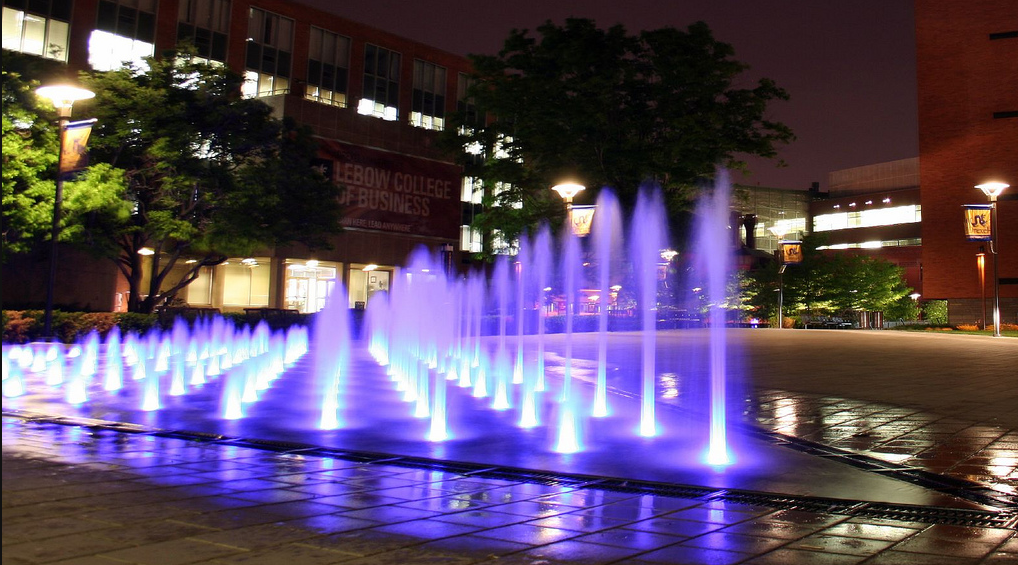
Main Campus fountain

The Campus of Drexel University is divided into four sites in Philadelphia, Pennsylvania—the University City Campus, the Center City Campus, the Queen Lane Campus, and the Academy of Natural Sciences. An additional location for the College of Medicine is under construction by Tower Health near Reading Hospital in West Reading, Pennsylvania. A branch campus in California—the Drexel University Sacramento Campus–closed in 2015.

== Philadelphia campuses ==
Free shuttles connect the Philadelphia campuses.

=== University City Main Campus ===
The University City Main Campus of Drexel University is located in the University City district of West Philadelphia. It is Drexel's largest and oldest campus.

==== Description ====
The University City Main Campus is located just west of the Schuylkill River. The campus reaches: from Chestnut St. in the south to Powelton Ave in the north; and from the Amtrak rail yard in the east to 34th St. in the west. The campus originally consisted of only the Main Building, dedicated in 1891, and its additions. The Main Building's facade is decorated with glazed architectural terra-cotta pattern reliefs and architectural sculptures. The university's first dormitory, the Art Deco style Van Rensselaer Hall, opened in 1932.

In the 1960s the campus expanded greatly and several new buildings were constructed, mainly in the International Style, with orange brick facades. Since then the University has bought nearly all the remaining buildings within the campus perimeter, and has adaptively reused many of them for academic and residential purposes; some of the more notable include the Rush Building, a former hospital that now houses the Drexel University College of Computing and Informatics and the Paul Peck Alumni Center, a former bank designed by Frank Furness. The university has since built another wave of new buildings, primarily in the Modern and Postmodern styles, with metal and glass facades.

North of the Drexel campus lies the Powelton Village district, a neighborhood of primarily Victorian homes. Drexel's continued efforts to expand the university and its dormitories have brought them into conflict with the Powelton Village Civic Association, which has attempted to block university projects on several occasions.

Drexel has been expanding into the University City Science Center buildings. This is a research park presently consisting of 16 modern buildings along Market Street, and is expanding westward. The buildings house labs, classrooms, and other operations of Drexel and the University of Pennsylvania, as well as hosting incubator spaces for startup companies and facilities used by 30 other stakeholders.

==== Art galleries ====
Drexel maintains several art galleries on its main campus. The Drexel Collection is housed primarily in the Westphal Picture Gallery, on the third floor of the Main Building. The collection was established by the university's founder, Anthony J. Drexel, who collected many types of art. The collection continued to receive donations after his death from family, friends, and alumni. The collection has a large variety of artworks and artifacts, including porcelains and furniture.

The Leonard Pearlstein Gallery is an aluminum and slate structure connected to Nesbitt Hall, the College of Media Arts and Design building, in which art exhibitions are frequently held. The slate side of the building is frequently covered with chalk messages about upcoming events.

==== Student life ====
The main campus is home to several student-life related locations, including the Creese Student Center, the Mandell Theater, and Lounge 101 in the basement of the Main Building. The main campus also includes Ross Commons, a remodeled old house converted for students' enjoyment to a restaurant, and meeting, leisure, and study space.

On the south end of campus the Creese Student Center has a cafe, information desk, and sitting areas and tables for students. In the basement are the commuter lounge and the Greenawalt Student Development Center, which houses offices and meeting rooms for many student organizations such as the Undergraduate Student Government Association (USGA).

Food

All first year resident students are required to purchase either a Gold, Blue or Platinum dining plan. The Gold plan entitles them to unlimited visits to the recently renovated Handschumacher Dining Center on Chestnut Street, while the Blue and Platinum plans allows 12 meals per week. They also receive a per-term allowance of dining dollars which can be spent at any of several campus locations including TAKE 3! featuring Freschetta at Ross Commons, the Creese Cafe at the Creese Center, the Taco Bell at Hagerty Library, Starbucks located on the ground level of the Pearlstein Business Learning Center. ThirtyOne41 in the Main Building and the Northside Dining Terrace, featuring a Subway, Chick-fil-A and Currito, on the first floor of Kelly Hall. Upperclassmen may purchase dining plans that allow them a limited number of visits and a different amount of dining dollars.

Non Drexel-owned food options include more than 10 lunch trucks, some spread out around campus and some on Ludlow St. behind the Main Building.

==== Department of Public Safety ====
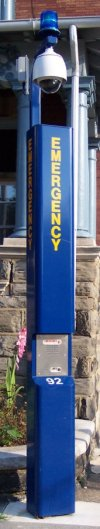
Emergency call box.

Drexel states that they aim to maintain a secure campus for students, staff, and local neighbors. Drexel's solution to the issue of crime includes work by Drexel Police, Philadelphia Police, and Drexel Public Safety (staffed by Allied Barton). Drexel has its own police force, and Drexel Police Officers are armed and have the same powers as the Philadelphia Police.

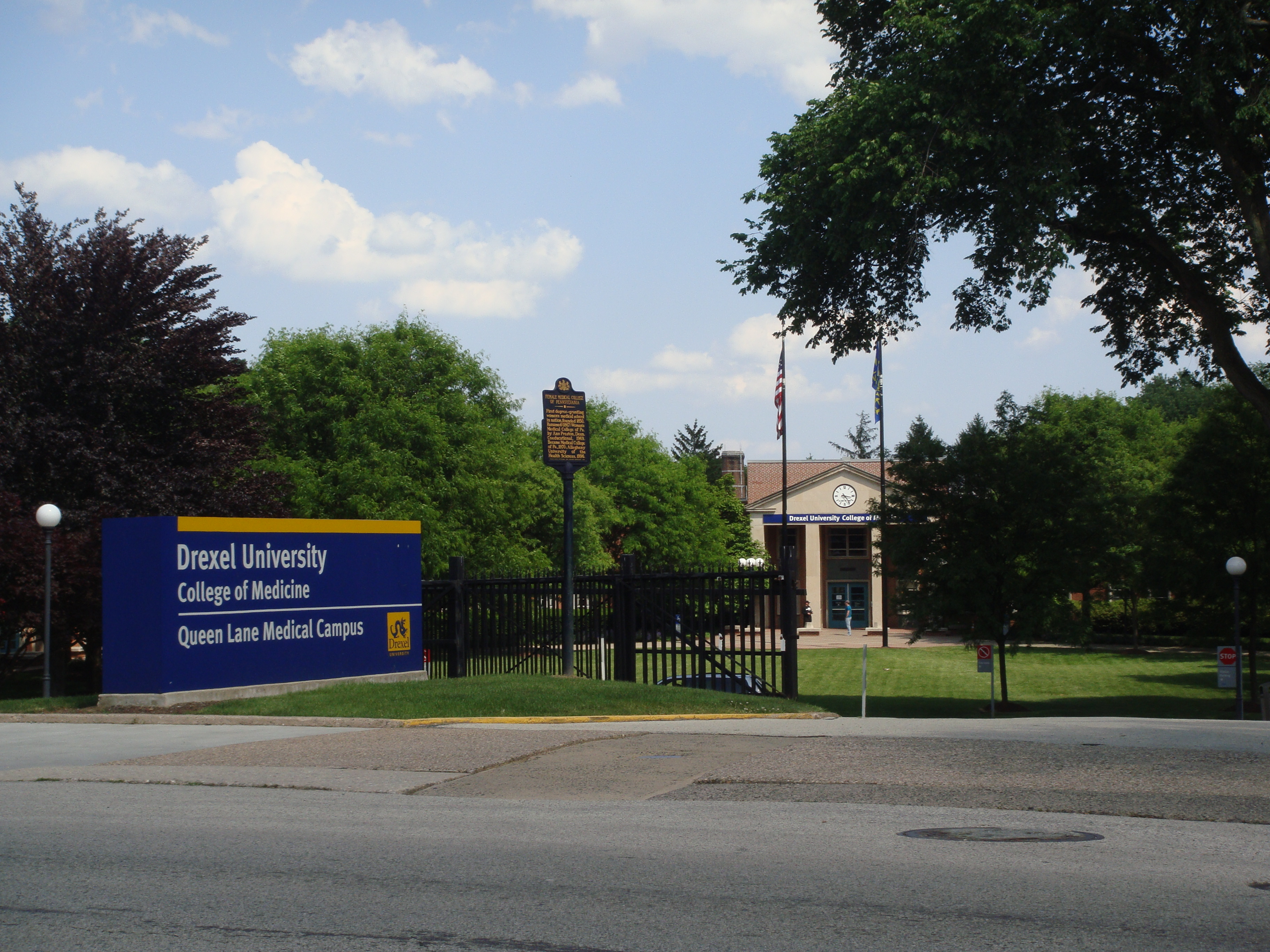
The Queen Lane Campus, East Falls, Philadelphia.

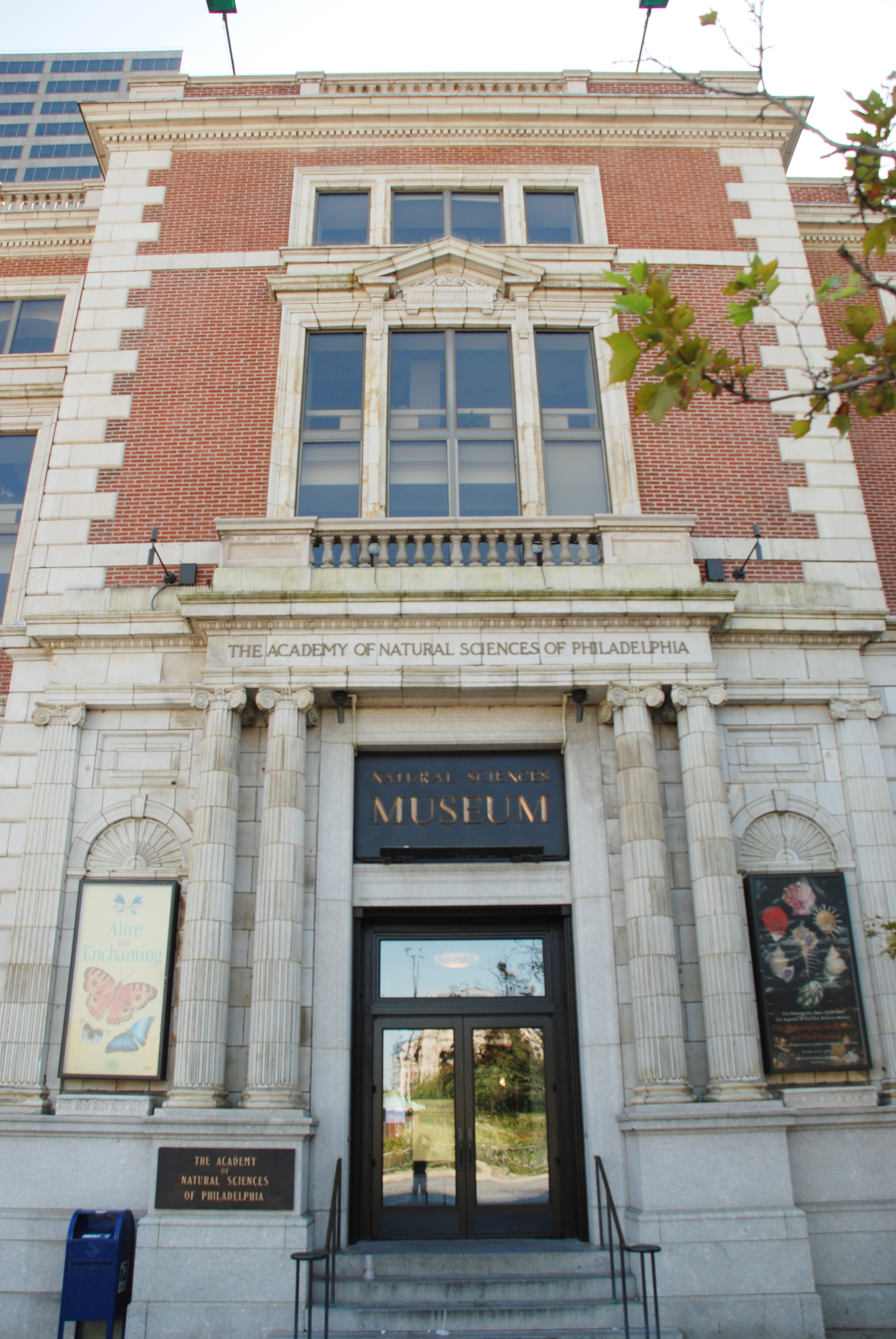
Academy of Natural Sciences.

=== Center City Campus ===
The Drexel University Center City Hahnemann Campus is one of two primary locations of the Drexel University College of Medicine. It was originally the home of Hahnemann University, which merged with the Medical College of Pennsylvania in 1993. Drexel acquired MCP Hahnemann University in 2002. The campus is located in Center City, Philadelphia, Broad and 15th Streets.

The School of Public Health moved to the main campus in 2014. As Hahnemann University Hospital closed in 2019 and Drexel does not own the site, the other Center City departments will relocate to the Main Campus, with the Colleges of Nursing and Medicine will move to a new building at 36th and Filbert by 2022 and research laboratories moving as their leases expire.

=== Queen Lane Campus ===
The Drexel University Queen Lane Campus is located at 2900 Queen Lane, giving it its name, in the East Falls neighborhood of northwestern Philadelphia. The Queen Lane Campus houses first and second-year medical students as well as biomedical graduate students of the Drexel University College of Medicine.

The Queen Lane campus was originally built for the Women's Medical College of Pennsylvania, which merged with Hahnemann University in 1988. The combined institution became the Drexel University College of Medicine in 2003.

=== Academy of Natural Sciences ===
The Academy of Natural Sciences of Drexel University is the oldest natural history museum in the United States and a world leader in biodiversity and environmental research. It was formed as the Academy of Natural Sciences of Philadelphia in 2012 and became affiliated with the university in 2011.

== Former California campus ==
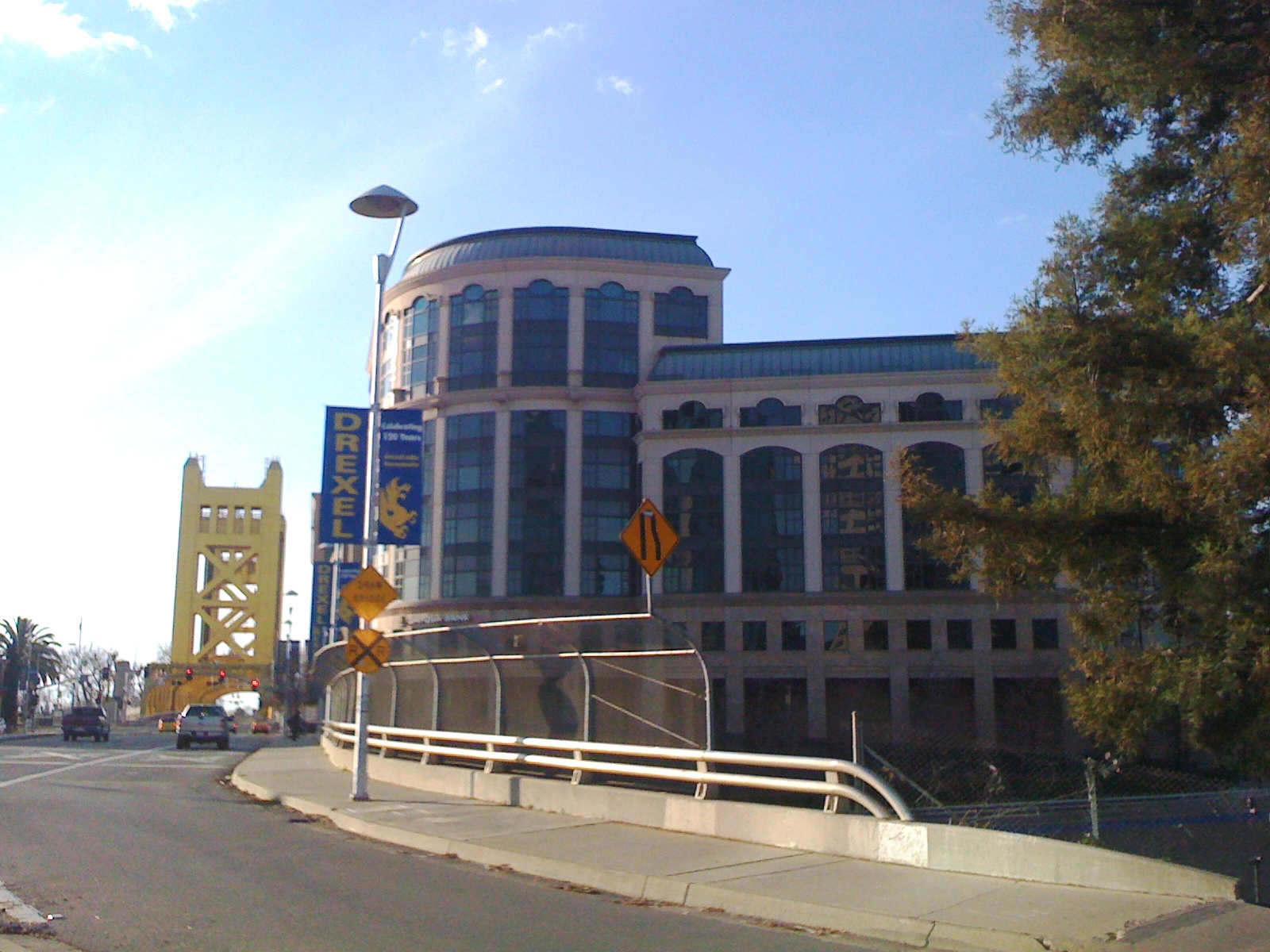
Drexel University Sacramento, with the Tower Bridge in background, Sacramento, California.

The Drexel University Sacramento campus was located on the Capitol Mall, next to the Tower Bridge over the Sacramento River, in downtown Sacramento, California. It was opened in 2008 as the Drexel University Sacramento Center for Graduate Studies, and renamed Drexel University Sacramento in 2012. In June 2011 the first commencement ceremony outside of Philadelphia in Drexel's 120-year history occurred here. The Downtown Sacramento campus offered an Ed.D. program in Educational Leadership and Management; and master's degree programs in Business Administration, Finance, Higher Education, Human Resource Development, Public Health, and Interdepartmental Medical Science. A Bachelor of Science in Business Administration transfer program commenced in Fall 2013.

Drexel University announced it was closing the campus in the spring of 2015, though current students were allowed to complete their studies. Negotiations were underway to transition some of the Drexel University Sacramento graduate degree programs to the University of the Pacific.
