= Jameela Al Salman =

Bahrani Professor and Physician

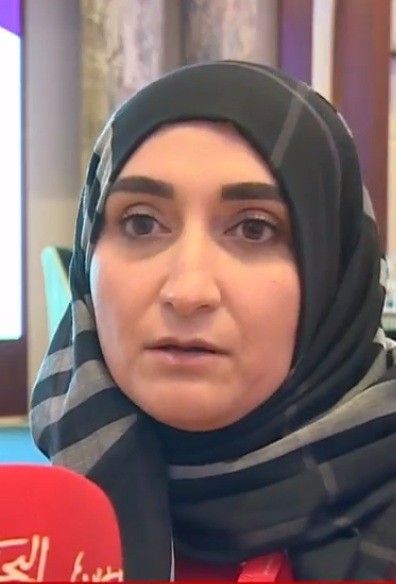
- Al Salman interviewed by Bahrain TV, March 2018

Jameela Al Salman (Arabic: جميلة السلمان) is a Bahraini physician, infectious disease specialist, and associate professor at the Arabian Gulf University. She has won several awards and honors for her contributions to the field of medicine. Al Salman holds three American Board certifications: the American Board of Internal Medicine, the American Board of Geriatric Medicine, and the American Board of Infectious Diseases. According to Royal Decree 41/2022, she was appointed Member of Shura Council (Upper House) for the term 2022-2026.

== Education ==
Jameela (or Jamila) Al Salman graduated from medical school at the Arabian Gulf University, with Honors. In 1996, she joined the Salmaniya Medical Complex in the Salmaniya district of Manama, in the Kingdom of Bahrain. Al Salman still works as a consultant at the Salmaniya Medical Complex Infectious and Internal Diseases. Further, she holds three certifications from the American Board: the American Board in Geriatric Medicine, the American Board in Internal Medicine, and the American Board in Infectious Diseases.

Al Salman completed her residency and fellowship programs in the United States. She finished her internal medicine residency at Hahnemann University, in Philadelphia, Pennsylvania. Al Salman also completed a fellowship in geriatric medicine at Temple University in Philadelphia from 2000 till 2002. Afterwards, she completed a fellowship in infectious diseases at Yale University.

== Career ==
Al Salman is an associate professor at the Arabian Gulf University. She is involved in various educational activities. She has been published in several peer-reviewed journals. Al Salman completed special training in HIV management and Hepatitis-C and another in infection control at Yale University. Al Salman also has the board certification in infection control (CBIC) and the American Board in medical quality. She is also a member in various professional societies, including the Infectious Diseases Society of America, the Bahrain Medical School, and the American College of Physicians.

Al Salman is a senior member of the National Taskforce for Combatting the Coronavirus in the Kingdom of Bahrain. Al Salman has been urging citizens and residents to continue complying with the precautionary measures to flatten the coronavirus curve. Furthermore, Al Salman has urged the Bahraini general public not to spread rumors, and to seek information from valid and official news resources. Al Salman has also been an advocate for precautionary steps to fight the virus, saying there is not a quick solution.

Al Salman has also shown interest in the development of robots to serve in the healthcare sector. She has told the Gulf Daily News that the use of robots to protect healthcare staff from excessive exposure to COVID-19 was a "pioneering experiment" in Bahrain and the rest of the Gulf Countries. Al Salman believes that these robots will protect not only medical personnel from exposure to COVID-19, but also sanitation workers from the constant exposure to chemicals.

== Awards ==
In 2016, Al Salman was awarded by the Prime Minister in the Kingdom of Bahrain for the best governmental practices in the program of antibiotic stewardship. In May 2021, Prince Salman bin Hamad Al Khalifa sent a congratulatory cable to Al Salman, who is the Consultant of Infectious and Internal Diseases at Salmaniya Medical Complex and a member of the National Medical Taskforce for Combating the Coronavirus. The award is to recognize her efforts in helping the country overcome its surge in COVID-19 cases, and her contributions to the health sector.

In 2020, Al Salman received the Arab Women Medical Excellence Award, by the Arab League general secretariat. She got the award in recognition of her outstanding efforts and as a member of the National Taskforce to combat coronavirus. "Half a million people were vaccinated by April 2021. Within two months we crossed the one-million mark on the first dose", she said. Princess Sabika bint Ibrahim Al Khalifa, wife of King of Bahrain and President of the Supreme Council for Women (SCW), has also sent a cable of congratulations to Al Salman, praising her on her commitment and initiative to set Bahrain as a leading example in combating the virus.

Al Salman has also won the award of the best poster presentation of scientific abstract at the first Scientific Conference on Acute Respiratory Infections (ARIs), hosted by the WHO Regional Office for the Eastern Mediterranean, in Amman, Jordan, in December 2017.
