= Moogega Cooper =

American astronomer

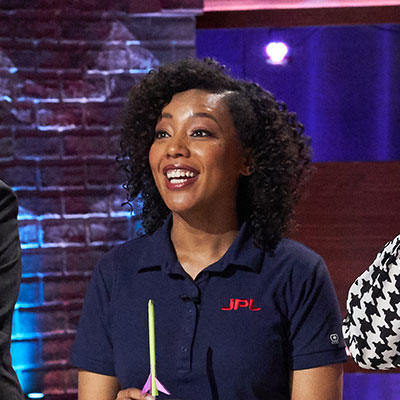
- Other name: Moogega Cooper Stricker
- Education: Hampton University; Drexel University College of Engineering
- Known for: Lead of Planetary Protection for Mars 2020 Mission
- Awards: NASA Early Career Public Achievement Medal
- Scientific career
- Fields: Astronomy, Mechanical Engineering
- Workplaces: NASA's Jet Propulsion Laboratory
- Thesis: Elucidation of Levels of Bacterial Viability Post-Non-Equilibrium Dielectric Barrier Discharge Plasma Treatment
- Doctoral advisor: Alexander Fridman
- Website: https://www.moogega.com

Moogega Cooper (born 1985) is an American astronomer, and the Lead of Planetary Protection for the Mars 2020 Mission and is involved with the InSight Mission. Cooper also takes part in programs and speaking engagements to encourage young women and others from underrepresented communities to pursue careers in science and technology.

== Early life ==
Cooper was born in 1985 in New Jersey to a Korean mother and African-American father, and World War II veteran. She received a B.S. degree in Physics (minor in Space, Earth, and Atmospheric sciences) from Hampton University in 2006, followed by an M.S. degree in 2008 and a Ph.D. in 2009, both in Mechanical Engineering with a concentration in thermal fluid sciences from Drexel University College of Engineering. Cooper's dissertation focused on non-equilibrium plasma sterilization of spacecraft materials, enabling her to obtain a position with the Jet Propulsion Laboratory's (JPL) Planetary Protection Group in 2011. She possesses eleven different research publications. Cooper is the Lead of Planetary Protection for the Mars 2020 Mission and is Group Supervisor for the biotechnology and planetary protection team for InSight Mission. Planetary protection is the practice of protecting solar system bodies from contamination by Earth life and protecting Earth from possible life forms that may be returned from other solar system bodies. In 2019, Cooper co-authored a study with scientists Ganesh Babu Malli Mohan and Kasthuri Venkateswaran, examining microbial contamination in NASA spacecraft assembly clean rooms using microscopy and molecular techniques to evaluate the biological particles relevant to planetary protection.

== Career ==
In her talk at the Yakima Town Hall in October 2022, Cooper attributed her passion for exploring space to Carl Sagan's 1980s "Cosmos" series, which included a book and a TV show. She is a strong advocate for increasing the representation of women and minority communities in STEM fields. Cooper has publicly stated her love for working with children through various K-12 student initiatives.

Cooper worked in collaboration with Drexel University to develop a plasma sterilization technology contender that would sterilize the returning container. For the Mars 2020 Mission, she ensured planetary protection requirements for the mission<.ref name=":0" /> She was responsible for microbial reduction techniques and sampling of the Helicopter throughout the assembly and integration phase to make sure the Helicopter did not spread contaminants from Earth. She ensured planetary protection requirements were met for the InSight device. She was responsible for sampling the spacecraft to meet Planetary Protection requirements and tested drills on testbeds mimicking various conditions for the Mars Science Laboratory. She delivered a Black History Month keynote lecture titled “Diversity in STEAM from a Real-Life Guardian of the Galaxy” at Penn State University.

== TV and media appearances ==
Cooper was a participant on the first season of King of the Nerds, which aired on TBS in 2013, finishing in 5th place. Cooper was a panelist in "The Original Martian Invasion", a 2017 episode of the television series Bill Nye Saves the World. She also appeared in 33 episodes of How the Universe Works from 2015 to 2023. She has also delivered a TEDxMarin talk titled "How to Find Life on Mars While Protecting Earth."

== Selected publications ==
- Cooper, M. (2004). Validation of SABER temperature measurements using ground-based instruments. IGARSS 2004. 2004 IEEE International Geoscience and Remote Sensing Symposium, 6, 4099–4101 vol.6. https://doi.org/10.1109/IGARSS.2004.1370033
- Exton, R. J., et al. "Levitation using microwave-induced plasmas." Applied Physics Letters 86.12 (2005): 124103.
- Kalghatgi, S. U., Fridman, G., Cooper, M., Nagaraj, G., Peddinghaus, M., Balasubramanian, M., Vasilets, V. N., Gutsol, A. F., Fridman, A., & Friedman, G. (2007). Mechanism of Blood Coagulation by Nonthermal Atmospheric Pressure Dielectric Barrier Discharge Plasma. IEEE Transactions on Plasma Science, 35(5), 1559–1566. https://doi.org/10.1109/TPS.2007.905953
- Nagaraj, Balasubramanian, M., Kalghatgi, S., Wu, A. S., Brooks, A. D., Fridman, G., Cooper, M., Vasilets, V. N., Gutsol, A., Fridman, A., & Friedman, G. (2007). Mechanism of Blood Coagulation by Non-Thermal Atmospheric Pressure Dielectric Barrier Discharge Plasma. Blood, 110(11), 3162–3162. https://doi.org/10.1182/blood.V110.11.3162.3162
- Cooper, M., Fridman, G., Staack, D., Gutsol, A. ., Vasilets, V. ., Anandan, S., Cho, Y. ., Fridman, A., & Tsapin, A. (2009). Decontamination of Surfaces From Extremophile Organisms Using Nonthermal Atmospheric-Pressure Plasmas. IEEE Transactions on Plasma Science, 37(6), 866–871. https://doi.org/10.1109/TPS.2008.2010618
- Cooper, M. La Duc, M. T., Probst, A., Vaishampayan, P., Stam, C., Benardini, J. N., Piceno, Y. M., Andersen, G. L., & Venkateswaran, K. (2011). Comparison of Innovative Molecular Approaches and Standard Spore Assays for Assessment of Surface Cleanliness. Applied and Environmental Microbiology, 77(15), 5438–5444. https://doi.org/10.1128/AEM.00192-11
- Kwan, K., Cooper, M., La Duc, M. T., Vaishampayan, P., Stam, C., Benardini, J. N., Scalzi, G., Moissl-Eichinger, C., & Venkateswaran, K. (2011). Evaluation of Procedures for the Collection, Processing, and Analysis of Biomolecules from Low-Biomass Surfaces. Applied and Environmental Microbiology, 77(9), 2943–2953. https://doi.org/10.1128/AEM.02978-10
- Robinson, Rakhmanov, R., Cooper-Stricker, M., & Dobrynin, D. (2019). Subatmospheric Pressure Microsecond Spark Discharge Plasma Jet for Surface Decontamination. IEEE Transactions on Plasma Science, 47(10), 4677–4682. https://doi.org/10.1109/TPS.2019.2936996
- Bhartia, R., Beegle, L. W., DeFlores, L., Abbey, W. J., Hollis, J. R., Uckert, K., Monacelli, B., Edgett, K. S., Kennedy, M. R., Sylvia, M., Aldrich, D., Anderson, M. S., Asher, S. A., Bailey, Z. J., Boyd, K., Burton, A. S., Caffrey, M., Calaway, M. J., Calvet, R. J., … Zan, J. A. (2021). Perseverance’s Scanning Habitable Environments with Raman and Luminescence for Organics and Chemicals (SHERLOC) Investigation. Space Science Reviews, 217(58). https://doi.org/10.1007/s11214-021-00812-z
- Shallcross, G. S., Hoey, W. A., Anderson, J. R., Soares, C., & Cooper, M. (2024). Modeling adhesion and aerodynamic removal of particles and spores from substrates. Journal of Aerosol Science, 176, 106294-. https://doi.org/10.1016/j.jaerosci.2023.106294

== Awards ==
- KTLA Black History Month Visionaries (2021)
- The Root 100 Most Influential African Americans (2020)
- JPL Team award “For the successful support and execution of Mars 2020 Project Systems Engineering tasks leading up to launch.” August 2020.
- Bruce Murray Award. “For exemplary and innovative efforts in inspiring the next generation of women and children in STEM with special emphasis on underserved communities” (2019)
- NASA Early Career Public Achievement Medal (2018)
- Charles Elachi Award for Exceptional Early Career Achievement (2018)
- Drexel University 40 under 40 Award (2015)
- NASA Group Achievement Award, “For exceptional performance in the rigorous evaluation and rapid synthesis of a development strategy for the Mars Sample Return Planetary Protection technology.” October 2012.
