= Matilda Evans =

African-American physician (1866–1935)

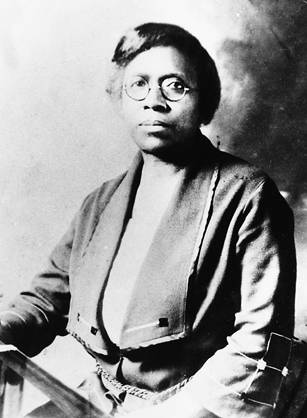
- Dr. Matilda Evans
- Born: Matilda Arabella Evans; May 13, 1866; Aiken, South Carolina
- Died: November 17, 1935 (aged 69); Columbia, South Carolina
- Education: Women's Medical College of Pennsylvania
- Occupation: Medical Doctor
- Known for: Established the first hospitals to treat African American patients in Columbia, South Carolina. Promoted healthy lifestyle and preventative care to the African American community in the early decades of the 20th century.

Matilda Arabella Evans (May 13, 1866 – November 17, 1935) was the first African-American woman licensed to practice medicine in South Carolina and an advocate for improved health care for African Americans, particularly children.

== Early life ==
Matilda Arabella Evans was born on May 13, 1866, to Anderson and Harriet Evans in Aiken, South Carolina. Matilda was the oldest of three children and spent much of the beginning of her life working in fields alongside her family. She attended the Schofield Industrial School, which was established by Martha Schofield, a Philadelphia Quaker. Schofield assisted Evans with applying to college and became her mentor, later inspiring Evans to write her biography. Schofield helped Evans raise the funds needed for Evans to attend Oberlin College in Oberlin, Ohio. She left in 1892 after graduating in 1891 from Oberlin College to accept a teaching position at Haines Institute in Augusta, Georgia. After a year of teaching Matilda entered the Woman’s Medical College in Philadelphia, again with the help of her resourceful mentor, Schofield, who persuaded a wealthy benefactor, Sarah Corlies, to fund her education. The Alfred Jones to whom this letter is addressed was Secretary of the Executive Committee of the Board of Corporators of the Woman's Medical College of Pennsylvania.

In 1897 Evans received a medical degree and abandoned her goal of becoming a medical missionary in Africa to move to Columbia, South Carolina and set up a practice.

== Medical career ==
Evans enrolled at the Woman's Medical College of Pennsylvania in 1893. She received her M.D. in 1897 and moved to Columbia, South Carolina, where she was the first African-American woman to establish a medical practice in the state. Prior to the Civil War, most African Americans were enslaved, and very few free African Americans were trained physicians or surgeons as medical education was not open to them. African Americans seeking medical careers most often received their medical education in Canada or Europe, and a few from medical schools in the North. In the late 19th and early 20th centuries, African Americans seeking a medical education were faced with difficult prospects. This continued into much of the 20th century, and although some black students were admitted into white medical schools and hospitals, they faced blatant racism, ostracism, and prejudice.

Evans becoming a surgeon was also the product and achievement of schools for women. In its early days, the Female Medical College of Pennsylvania, or Woman's Medical College as it was renamed in 1867, faced serious opposition from the male medical establishment. Prevailing notions held women to be too feeble-minded to succeed in the demanding arena of academic medicine and too delicate to endure the physical requirements of clinical practice. One of the most serious barriers to the success of the college was the lack of clinical experience available to its students and interns because area hospitals would not allow women to attend lectures or to treat patients. To remedy this situation, Ann Preston, M.D., a member of the College’s first graduating class, founded Woman’s Hospital of Philadelphia, and the college itself was housed in rented hospital space from 1862 to 1875. The college eventually built its own hospital, floor by floor as funds allowed, from 1903 until 1913.

As the first African-American woman licensed to practice in South Carolina, Evans was able to treat both white and black patients, causing her services to be in great demand. She built up a large clientele of wealthy white women, who paid her sufficiently to allow her to treat poor black women and children for free. Her large and rare interracial clientele were built up due to her great discretion and professionalism. She practiced obstetrics, gynecology, and surgery, and cared for patients in her own home until she established the Taylor Lane Hospital and Training School for Nurses, the first black hospital in the city of Columbia, in 1901. Dr. Evans took care of patients in her house before the establishment of the Taylor Lane Hospital because there were no medical facilities at the time that would allow an African-American physician to treat and admit patients. By 1907 Evans was able to write to Alfred Jones, Bursar at Woman's Medical College of Pennsylvania, "I have done well, and have a very large practice among all classes of people... I have had unlimited success... Since I have returned to my native state, others have been inspired and have gone to our beloved college to take degrees." She was writing to Alfred Jones on behalf of a promising young African-American woman who wanted to attend WMCP but was in need of scholarship assistance. Evans later established another hospital, St. Luke's Hospital and Training School for Nurses, which she directed until 1918. Evans attempted to volunteer for the army medical corps in the beginning of the First World War, but was rejected. This prompted her to personally treat the wounded from South Carolina and surrounding states in her own practice.

According to historian Darlean Clark Hine, in an article on Evans which appeared in The Journal of Southern History Vol 70 No 1 Feb 2004, The St. Luke's Hospital which was established by Dr. Evans was located in Columbia, South Carolina and consisted of fourteen rooms and twenty beds, a facility that she operated until 1918.

St. Luke’s Hospital was the fourth hospital in the country to operate a school for nurses. Today St. Luke's School of Nursing is the nation’s oldest hospital-based, diploma school in continuous operation. The reputation of the school flourished during the 1920s and '30s. During World War II, St. Luke’s School of Nursing was approved for the Cadet Nurse Corps program. In 1962, the school was awarded full accreditation from the National League for Nursing. Beginning in 1969, college credits were added to the curriculum. Today, these college credits in science and liberal arts are prerequisites to entering the nursing program. The School of Nursing is approved by the Pennsylvania State Board of Nursing and was fully reaccredited in 1997 by the National League for Nursing, Accrediting Commission.

== Child and community health care advocacy ==
Matilda Evans was highly active in her community. In addition to establishing Taylor Lane Hospital (which became St. Luke’s Hospital and Training School for Nurses after a fire destroyed the first hospital), she established a community health organization, a community center and a boys’ pool (Dr. Evans Park and Swimming Pool) among other countless benefits to Columbia’s black community. Throughout her life Evans also adopted seven children and eventually fostered over two dozen more. She also was responsible for largely contributing to the buying and equipping of The Dr. Evans Park and Swimming Pool for the public. Evans also conducted a survey of black school-age children in Columbia, South Carolina and found serious problems with their health care; she used the results to implement routine health examinations in schools.

Evans had a special concern for black children. She believed that health care should be a citizenship right and a governmental responsibility, much like education. She strongly advocated public health care and petitioned the State Board of Health of South Carolina to provide free vaccines for black children. In 1916 Evans created the Negro Health Association of South Carolina and two years later in 1918 she volunteered in the Medical Service Corps of the United States Army during World War I. Her work with poor communities encouraged her to found the Columbia Clinic Association in 1930, which provided health services (such as vaccinations and check-ups) and health education to impoverished families. Through the Negro Health Association of South Carolina Evans continued her mission of health education. Evans also founded the Good Health Association of South Carolina to help convince and inspire people that they could improve their own health by following sound health practices and safe sanitary habits.

== Roles in organizations ==
In 1922 Dr. Matilda Evans became the only black woman in the United States to serve as the president of a state medical association when she became president of South Carolina's Palmetto M.A. Evans also served as a regional Vice President of the National Medical Association and also established the Negro Health Journal of South Carolina. In World War I Evans was appointed to the Volunteer Medical Service Corps. The Volunteer Medical Service Corps was established by the U.S. Council of National Defense in the early years of World War I to meet the increasing demand for medical services at home. Every qualified doctor, male or female of any age, was able to apply for admission into the Corps. Senate Bill 1424, passed in April 1908, granted the US Army authority to set up a reserve body of medical personnel. This became the Medical Reserve Corps (MRC) and the unit remained active until 1917 when it was merged into the Officer's Reserve Corps. To qualify for admission into the MRC applicants had to meet certain criteria and, since many did not, they were left unable to serve their country. Franklin H. Martin, chairman of the General Medical Board of the Council of National Defense, saw an opportunity to ease the burden on the medical system in the United States by utilizing this untapped source of medical expertise, and spearheaded the creation of the VMSC. The casualties of World War I strained the medical profession in the United States. According to the International Journal of Surgery (Vol. 31, Sept. 1912), by July 1912, doctors were being signed up for military service at a rate of 540 per week and it was estimated by the US Army that at least 50,000 doctors would be needed for the war effort. This high demand left many communities without doctors so the Volunteer Medical Services Corps (VMSC) was established to ensure that civilians were not left without adequate care. She was religious, and served as chair of the Council of the Episcopal Church Upper Diocese.

== Personal life ==
Charity, compassion, and a love of children were the hallmarks of Dr. Evans' career; she charged only nominal fees. She rode bicycles, horses and buggies to visit the sick who were unable to go to her surgery for any reason. She provided for school physical examinations and immunizations, which in turn saved the lives of countless young children, and in 1930, operated a clinic that was free for African-American children who needed medical treatment and vaccinations. Incredibly, Evans also found the time to raise 11 children who needed a home. Many of the children she became a mother to were children who were left at her practice, but she also brought up five children from relatives who were deceased. She taught the children respect, cleanliness, and manners, and provided them all with the opportunity for a college education that she also had. People, young and old, enjoyed the facilities that she shared at a recreational center which she had built on her 20-acre farm. Evans loved to swim, dance, knit and play the piano. Richland Memorial Hospital in Columbia has named an award in her honor which is truly deserving of the name and legacy she left behind. Evans ran her own farm like the one she grew up on and founded a weekly newspaper, The Negro Health Journal of South Carolina. She also offered a program of recreational activities for underprivileged boys. Evans never married. At the age of 69, on November 17, 1935, Matilda Arabella Evans died in Columbia, South Carolina.
