= Robert J. Wicks =

American writer (born 1946)

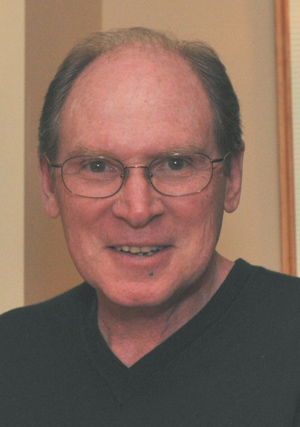
- Wicks in 2020
- Born: Queens, New York
- Occupations: Clinical psychologist, professor, speaker, spiritual guide, therapist, and writer
- Writing career
- Genres: Prevention of secondary stress and the integration of psychology and spirituality
- Subjects: Self-care, mindfulness and meditation, psychological and spiritual growth
- Website: robertjwicks.com

Robert J. Wicks is a clinical psychologist and writer about the intersection of spirituality and psychology. Wicks is a speaker, therapist, and spiritual guide who has taught at universities and professional schools of psychology, medicine, nursing, theology, and social work for more than thirty years. He is a Professor Emeritus at Loyola University Maryland.

He is a recipient of the Holy Cross Pro Ecclesia et Pontifice, the highest medal that can be awarded to the laity by the Papacy for distinguished service to the Catholic Church.

In 2003 he was the Commencement Speaker for Wright State School of Medicine in Dayton, Ohio and in 2005 he was both Visiting Scholar and the Commencement Speaker at Stritch School of Medicine in Chicago. He was also Commencement Speaker at and the recipient of an honorary doctorate from Caldwell College in New Jersey.

== Early life and education ==
Wicks graduated from Fairfield University in Connecticut in 1968 with a Bachelor of Arts degree in psychology and philosophy.

After working in counseling for the New York State Narcotic Addiction Control Commission, he enlisted in the United States Marine Corps.

He went on to receive his Master of Arts degree in 1973 from St. John's University in New York City. In 1977, he received his doctorate in psychology from Hahnemann Medical College and Hospital.

== Career ==
Since finishing his doctorate, he has taught in universities and professional schools of psychology, medicine, nursing, theology, and social work.

In 1994, he was responsible for the psychological debriefing of relief workers evacuated from Rwanda during their bloody civil war. In 1993, and again in 2001, he worked in Cambodia. During these visits, his work was with professionals from the English-speaking community who were present to help the Khmer people rebuild their nation following years of terror and torture.

In 2000, he was appointed as Professor of Philosophy at the University of Auckland.

In 2003 he was the Commencement Speaker for Wright State School of Medicine in Dayton, Ohio, and in 2005 he was both Visiting Scholar and the Commencement Speaker at Stritch School of Medicine in Chicago.

In 2006, Wicks delivered presentations on self-care at the National Naval Medical Center in Bethesda, Maryland, and Walter Reed Army Hospital to those health care professionals responsible for Iraqi and Afghan war veterans evacuated to the U.S. with multiple amputations and severe head injuries.

Also in 2006, Wicks received the first annual Alumni Award for Excellence in Professional Psychology from Widener University and is also the recipient of the Humanitarian of the Year Award from the American Counseling Association's Division on Ethics and Values.

In the past several years he has spoken on Capitol Hill to Members of Congress and their Chiefs of Staff, at Johns Hopkins School of Medicine, the U.S. Air Force Academy, the Mayo Clinic, the North American Aerospace Defense Command, at Harvard's Children's Hospital and Harvard Divinity School, to members of the NATO Intelligence Fusion Centre in England, and to the Institute of Private Investors on his major areas of expertise: resilience, self-care, and the prevention of secondary stress (the pressures encountered in reaching out to others). He has also spoken at the Boston Public Library's commemoration of the Boston Marathon bombing, addressed 10,000 educators in the Air Canada Arena in Toronto, was the opening keynote speaker to 1,500 physicians for the American Medical Directors Association, spoken at the FBI and New York City Police Academies, led a weeklong course in Paris and addressed care givers in China, Vietnam, India, Thailand, Northern Ireland, Scotland, Hungary, Guatemala, Malta, New Zealand, Australia, and South Africa.

Wicks has published more than 50 books for both professionals and the general public. His books include Riding the Dragon, Perspective: The Calm within the Storm and Bounce: Living the Resilient Life.

== Personal life ==
Wicks is a Professor Emeritus at Loyola University Maryland and lives in West Chester, Pennsylvania, with his wife of more than forty years, Michaele Barry Wicks, who is both a nurse and a lecturer on Teresa of Avila and biblical/women's spirituality. They have a daughter, Michaele Kulick, who is a social worker for the Veteran's Administration; she works with severely injured returning Iraqi and Afghan military personnel.

== Books ==
- Wicks, R. (ed.) Let's Look Together: Henri Nouwen as Spiritual Mentor. Cincinnati: Franciscan Media, 2023.
- Wicks, R. (ed.) The Simple Care of a Hopeful Heart: Mentoring Yourself in Difficult Times. Cincinnati: Franciscan Media, 2021.
- Wicks, R. (ed.) Prayer in the Catholic Tradition: A Handbook of Practical Approaches. Cincinnati: Franciscan Media, 2016.
- Wicks, R. Conversations with a Guardian Angel. Cincinnati: Franciscan Media, 2015.
- Wicks, R. Spiritual Resilience: 30 Days to Refresh Your Soul. Cincinnati: Franciscan Media, 2015.
- Wicks, R. Availability: The Challenge and the Gift of Being Present. Notre Dame: Sorin Books, 2015.
- Wicks, R. No Problem: Turning the Next Corner in Your Spiritual Life. Notre Dame: Sorin Books, 2014.
- Wicks, R. Riding the Dragon. Notre Dame, IN: Sorin Books, 2012.
- Wicks, R. Bounce: Living the Resilient Life. New York: Oxford University Press, 2009.
- Wicks, R. Prayerfulness: Awakening to the Fullness of Life. Notre Dame: Sorin Books, 2009.
- Wicks, R. The Resilient Clinician. New York: Oxford University Press, 2007.
- Wicks, R. Overcoming Secondary Stress in Medical and Nursing Practice: A Guide to Professional Resilience and Personal Well-Being. N.Y: Oxford University Press, 2006.
- Wicks, R. Crossing the Desert. Notre Dame, IN: Sorin Books, 2006.
- Wicks, R., D. Parsons, and D. Capps, (Eds.). Clinical Handbook of Pastoral Counseling, Vol. 3. Mahwah, NJ: Paulist Press, 2003
- Wicks, R. Everyday Simplicity. Notre Dame, IN: Sorin Books, 2000.
- Wicks, R., D. Parsons, and D. Capps, (Eds.). Clinical Handbook of Pastoral Counseling, Volume I – Expanded Edition. Mahwah, NJ: Paulist Press, 1993.
- Wicks, R., and D. Parsons (Eds.). Clinical Handbook of Pastoral Counseling, Volume II—Selected Topics. Mahwah, NJ: Paulist Press, 1993.
- Parsons, R., and Wicks, R. Counseling Strategies and Intervention Techniques for the Human Services. (Fourth Edition). Boston, MA: Allyn and Bacon, 1993.

== Awards and honors ==
- 2006 First Annual Graduate Award for Excellence in Professional Psychology
- Widener University
- 2002 Doctor of Pastoral Counseling (Honoris Causa) Caldwell College
- 1997 The Outstanding Colleague Award National Association of Catholic Chaplains
- 1996 Papal Medal Pro Ecclesia et Pontifice for service to the church.
- 1993 The Humanitarian Award Association for Spiritual, Ethical, Religious and Value Issues in Counseling American Counseling Association
- 1981 Cited by Philadelphia Magazine as one of the "81 People to Watch in 1981" for his efforts to integrate religion and psychology.
- 1977 Award for clinical and academic excellence in the Clinical Psychology Program, Hahnemann Medical College, Philadelphia, Pennsylvania.
- 1975 Successfully nominated by the Clinical Psychology Department and Graduate School of Hahnemann Medical College for 1976 edition of Who's Who Among Students in American Colleges and Universities.
- 1973 Citation by the Fairfield University Alumni Association for "exceptional accomplishments, both professionally and personally ... as a teacher and author."

Several books have also been selected by major academic/professional book clubs (Behavioral Science Book Club; Mental Health Practitioners Book Club; Theological Book Service).
