= Chris Visco =

Cannabis entrepreneur

Christina Visco
- Born: March 9, 1971; Norristown, Pennsylvania
- Died: October 19, 2023 (aged 52); Falmouth Harbour, Antigua and Barbuda
- Occupation: Businesswomen
- Known for: Cannabis industry professional

Christina "Chris" Visco (March 9, 1971 – October 19, 2023) was a businesswoman and retail professional best known for her work in the cannabis industry.

She was credited with being the first female issued a license for a medical marijuana dispensary in Pennsylvania with her business TerraVida Holistic Centers. Visco was widely known for being the CEO of the cannabis multi-state operator (MSO) TerraLeaf which operates in West Virginia, but also has licenses in Illinois and New Jersey.

In addition to being an entrepreneur, Visco was active in business groups such as the Women's Business Enterprise National Council (WBENC). TerraVida was one of the only cannabis businesses to be certified as a Women's Business Enterprise (WBE). Visco was also a breast cancer survivor. Her illness further motivated her to provide safe access to medical marijuana in Pennsylvania and beyond. Visco's charitable works also include donating to soup kitchens, homeless shelters, and domestic violence centers – as well as helping overturn cannabis convictions.

== Early life ==
Visco attended Drexel University. She was the daughter of late Montgomery County Sheriff John P. Durante and Jill Durante Bukata. She started smoking weed as a teenager and went to "a lot of Grateful Dead shows".

== Career ==
=== David’s Bridal ===
In 1998, Visco transitioned to a new job as a buyer for David’s Bridal. In this position, Visco was responsible for purchasing and merchandising at 178 retail stores that generated $60 million in revenue during her tenure. During her time at David’s Bridal, Visco was regularly recognized for exceeding sales plans and achieving the highest comparable store increases in the company.

=== Performance Lighting ===
In 2004, Visco partnered with an entrepreneur to land a government contract for lighting. During this time, Visco's firm utilized prison labor to fulfill the U.S. Department of Justice contract.

=== PJs and Coffee ===
In 2008, Visco embarked on the entrepreneurial path by founding the social media marketing agency PJs and Coffee. As the Founder and CEO, she worked with businesses of all sizes to maximize online exposure via social media engagement. During this time, Visco also coordinated internships with the Drexel University Co-Op Program.

=== Social Politics ===
In 2010, Visco continued her entrepreneurial pursuits – this time by starting the political consulting firm Social Politics. Working as a Political Strategist and Campaign Manager at her own company, she ran several successful campaigns – including PA State Representative Chris Rabb and Montgomery County, PA Sheriff Eileen Behr. Although no longer her primary focus, Visco remains active in politics to this day.

=== Buns Bakery ===
In 2016, Visco opened Buns Bakery in Flourtown, Pennsylvania. Situated in the Flourtown Farmers Market, the bakery offered pastry, pie, cake, bread, and treats.

=== TerraVida Holistic Centers ===
In 2017, Visco founded the medical marijuana chain TerraVida Holistic Centers in Pennsylvania. At the time, it was the only female-run dispensary chain in the state. Upon hearing about the legalization of medical cannabis in Pennsylvania in 2016, Visco was motivated to enter the new industry. For the initial application process for medical marijuana dispensaries in Pennsylvania, TerraVida Holistic Centers received the highest score in the southeast region of the state. Visco eventually opened 3 Pennsylvania stores under the TerraVida brand, becoming the highest-volume dispensary chain in the Greater Philadelphia area. In 2021, Visco was also awarded cannabis business licenses in the states of Illinois and West Virginia. To help overturn cannabis convictions in Pennsylvania, Visco also founded the TerraVida Victims of the War on Drugs (VOWD) organization. In turn, TerraVida was involved in several community projects that helped overturn cannabis convictions. TerraVida was acquired by Illinois company Verano Holdings for $135 million in May 2021. TerraVida now operates under the Zen Leaf brand.

=== TerraLeaf Dispensaries ===
In 2021, after being awarded a medical cannabis dispensary permit in West Virginia, Visco opened a cannabis Education Center in Huntington, WV. Modeled after a similar center Visco launched in Pennsylvania, the Education Center is designed to teach the public about the benefits of medical cannabis, while also assisting with patient registration and product questions. In 2022, Vico opened the first TerraLeaf medical marijuana dispensary next door to the Education Center in Huntington, WV. The store was placed in Huntington, WV due to its strategic location, as well as the fact it is the epicenter of the opioid epidemic in West Virginia. TerraLeaf hopes medical marijuana can help the people of West Virginia find relief from ailments like chronic pain without the use of addictive opioids.
