= New Valley LLC =

- Company type: Subsidiary
- Industry: Diversified holding
- Founded: 1986; 40 years ago
- Founder: Bennett S. LeBow
- Headquarters: Miami, Florida, United States
- Key people: Bennett S. LeBow (chairman); Howard Lorber (president and CEO)
- Products: Real estate; Property management
- Revenue: $1.7 billion (2015)
- Net income: $59.2 million (2015)
- Total assets: $1.3 billion (2015)
- Number of employees: 1,090 (2015)
- Parent: Vector Group
- Website: www.newvalley.com

New Valley is an American investment company owned by Vector Group.

== History ==
Western Union was renamed New Valley in the early 1990s as the corporate parent of all Western Union-related businesses. In 1994, New Valley sold its Western Union businesses to First Financial Management (later acquired by First Data) for $1.2 Billion.

After more than 100 years of being a publicly traded entity, New Valley became a wholly owned subsidiary of Vector Group on December 13, 2005 when Vector Group acquired the remaining 42.3% of New Valley's common shares that it did not already own. New Valley presently has a 70% stake in Douglas Elliman, the largest residential real estate brokerage in the New York metropolitan area. The company also has stakes in various hotels and golf courses in the United States. In conjunction with the spin-off of its Ladenburg Thalmann subsidiary New Valley retained a 7.6% stake in Ladenburg Thalmann Financial Services, an investment bank and stock brokerage based in Miami.
