= Ladenburg Thalmann =

American financial services company

Coordinates: 25°49′0.46″N 80°11′19.37″W

- Company type: Public
- Traded as: AMEX: LTS; Russell 2000 Component
- Industry: Investment services
- Founded: New York City, New York, United States (1876)
- Headquarters: Miami, Florida, United States
- Key people: Richard J. Lampen (CEO)
- Products: Investment banking brokerage and advisory services asset management
- Revenue: ▲$651.1 million USD (FY 2012)
- Number of employees: 2,700 employees and advisors
- Website: ladenburg.com

Ladenburg Thalmann Financial Services is a diversified financial services company with two primary business lines: independent brokerage and advisory and investment banking and capital markets. The company is engaged in investment banking, equity research, institutional sales and trading, brokerage services, asset management, and trust services. Ladenburg Thalmann Financial Services is based in Miami, Florida. The company has more than 4,000 financial advisors with approximately $125 billion in client assets.

Ladenburg Thalmann Financial Services was acquired by Advisor Group, a private-equity firm, in November 2019.

== History ==
Ernst Thalmann, an American banker, and Adolph Ladenburg, the son of German banker Emil Ladenburg, founded Ladenburg Thalmann in 1876. In 1879, Ernst Thalmann paid $13,550 (equivalent to $468,000 in 2025) for a seat on the New York Stock Exchange.

Ladenburg Thalmann became one of the most influential private merchant banking firms, a major financial intermediary between America, Great Britain, and the European Continent. It played an important role in financing the growth of American industry—particularly America's railroads, utilities, and emerging industries—through the early twentieth century and was among the few investment banks to prosper during the Great Depression. It has financed the merger of Ferrocarril Central Mexicano (Mexican Central Railway) of Mexico, the electrification of Companhia Paulista de Estradas de Ferro in Brazil, led the syndicate for Port Authority of New York and New Jersey bonds and was the bank Albert Einstein chose to invest 75% of his Nobel Prize money.

In the early part of the 20th century, many notable businessmen joined Ladenburg Thalmann as partners, including Gerson von Bleichröder and Benjamin Seymour Guinness and Walter Tower Rosen.

=== World War II ===
Ladenburg Thalmann provided banking services for the Allies' covert warfare activities throughout World War II. SOE in London was tasked by HM Treasury in July 1942 as the lead British agency for the acquisition of foreign currency, required in small denominations by members of the plethora of British covert wartime agencies, as well as the escape packs of Allied aircrew. SOE turned to British Security Coordination (BSC) for help with this task; the very close links between BSC and the OSS meant that there was continual collaboration between the two agencies in support of this task. Some of the currencies acquired were seized from ships being searched in the Contraband Control Bases, such as Bermuda, Gibraltar, and Aden, or legitimately bought from legitimate passengers on those ships. Another source was the black markets in Tangiers, Beirut, Istanbul, and elsewhere, from the sale of commodities such as gold, platinum, diamonds, precious stones, and Swiss watches. Most of these items, in short supply because of the Allied blockade and restrictions on movement, could be purchasing using sterling by British government supply departments within the British Empire.

Virtually every European currency was acquired, as well as South American and Far Eastern currencies; a statement from mid-1944 prepared for Winston Churchill cited the cumulative acquisitions to that date as being 600m French francs, 20m Belgian francs, 8m Dutch guilders, 3.5m Norwegian kroner, 3.5m Danish kroner, 6m Reichsmarks, 8m Spanish pesetas, 16m U.S. dollars, and 0.5m Argentine pesos. Excluding the U.S. dollars and Argentine pesos, the balance had cost the British Treasury around £2m. A major problem that both SOE and BSC had to contend with was the sheer weight and volume of small denomination bank notes; a number of surviving signals in SOE files at National Archives in Kew mention "tons" of bank notes.

There is no doubt that contraband seizures by Allied blockade authorities were 'recycled' to support wartime covert activity. Musson's Smuggling Fleet, which operated from Gibraltar carrying SOE and SIS agents to and from Spanish soil, covered its tracks with a smuggling operation based initially on selling tobacco seized from blockade-running merchant ships. Tobacco was deemed a more useful bribe to badly-paid Spanish border and customs officials, and hundreds of tons were shipped in from Latin America, and North Africa post-TORCH, blended and packaged in Gibraltar, and handed to Musson's operation to maintain the smuggling cover.

== Modern acquisitions ==
Ladenburg Thalmann does business through its subsidiaries, the largest of which are Ladenburg Thalmann & Co. Inc., Securities America, Securities Service Network, LLC., Investacorp, Inc., Triad Advisors, LLC, KMS Financial Services, Inc., Ladenburg Thalmann Asset Management Inc. and Premier Trust, Inc.

=== Investacorp, Inc. ===
Investacorp, Inc., an independent broker-dealer headquartered in Miami, Florida, has been serving the independent registered representative community since 1978 and has approximately 440 independent financial advisors nationwide. The firm was acquired by Ladenburg Thalmann in October 2007.

=== Triad Advisors, LLC ===
Triad Advisors, LLC, was acquired by Ladenburg Thalmann in August 2008. The firm was founded in 1993, and is an independent broker-dealer and registered investment advisor headquartered in Norcross, Georgia that offers products through approximately 590 independent financial advisors nationwide.

=== Premier Trust, Inc. ===
Founded in 2001, Premier Trust, Inc. was acquired by Ladenburg Thalmann in September 2010. It is a Nevada-chartered trust company headquartered in Las Vegas, Nevada, with assets under management of approximately $530 million.

=== Securities America Inc. ===
Securities America Inc. was acquired by Ladenburg Thalmann from Ameriprise Financial in November 2011 for $150 million in cash and potential future payments. The firm was founded in 1993 and has headquarters in La Vista, Nebraska. The firm is a SEC-Registered investment advisory firm that offers investment management, financial advice and financial planning through a national network of independent financial advisors. It is the nation's seventh largest independent broker-dealer (as ranked by Financial Planning magazine, June 2011, based on 2010 total revenue). The firm received the inaugural Thought Leadership Award from the Retirement Income Industry Association in March 2011.

=== KMS Financial Services, Inc. ===
Founded in 1971, KMS Financial Services, Inc. is a Seattle-based registered broker dealer and investment advisory firm serving clients through a network of more than 350 investment professionals located throughout the Pacific Northwest and nationwide. Ladenburg Thalmann acquired KMS in 2014. Along with fellow Ladenburg firm, Securities America, KMS made the "IBD Elite 2019: Which firms have the most reps who are women?" list produced by Financial Planning magazine, ranking at #4.

== Notable current and former employees ==
- Andrew A. Lanyi, stock broker, analyst, concentration camp survivor, investor and author
- Lionel Pincus, Founder of Warburg Pincus
- Mark Klein current chairman and CEO of National Securities and founder of GSV Capital
- Ronald Kramer, CEO of Ladenburg Thalmann, 1995–1999; former president of Wynn Resorts and current CEO of Griffon Corporation
- Porter Bibb, media banker and the first publisher of Rolling Stone magazine
- Bennett LeBow, financier and chairman of the Board of Vector Group
- Benjamin Guinness, member of the Guinness family
- Joseph Pichardo, stock broker, Film producer, founder of CEM Marketing
- Luca Alessandro Longobardi, is an Italian entrepreneur, a former venture capitalist and investment banker. He gained attention for being wrongfully arrested and spending a month in prison in Brazil, during which period he became known as "the mafia's banker". Best selling author.
