= Todd Shelton =

Todd Shelton is an American fashion brand founded in 2002 by Tennessee native Todd Shelton. The brand's collections are manufactured within the company's New Jersey headquarters and sold exclusively online. The Todd Shelton factory and showroom are headquartered East Rutherford, New Jersey.

== Collections ==
Todd Shelton designs and manufactures made-to-order jeans, shirts, pants and t-shirts for men. The company have a U.S. factory that offers e-commerce customers ways to personalize their button-down shirts or jeans with multiple-fit choices, such as straight or tapered leg, or the length of a sleeve, or shirttail.

== Manufacturing ==
Todd Shelton is an American-Made Men's Clothing Brand. The brand's manufacturing puts a twist on online shopping. At the intersection of off-the-rack and bespoke tailoring.

Todd Shelton's company owns 55 sewing machines, a fusing machine and a handful of other specialty machines that help make their line of T-shirts, button-downs and jeans. The brand initially began by outsourcing, but in 2006, Todd Shelton moved all manufacturing to factories in the USA. Then, as Shelton grew increasingly frustrated by the supply chain and being dependent on manufacturer's timelines and frequent fickleness, he scaled things back and, in 2012, opened his own factory.
