= Luca Alessandro Longobardi =

Italian entrepreneur, venture capitalist and investment banker

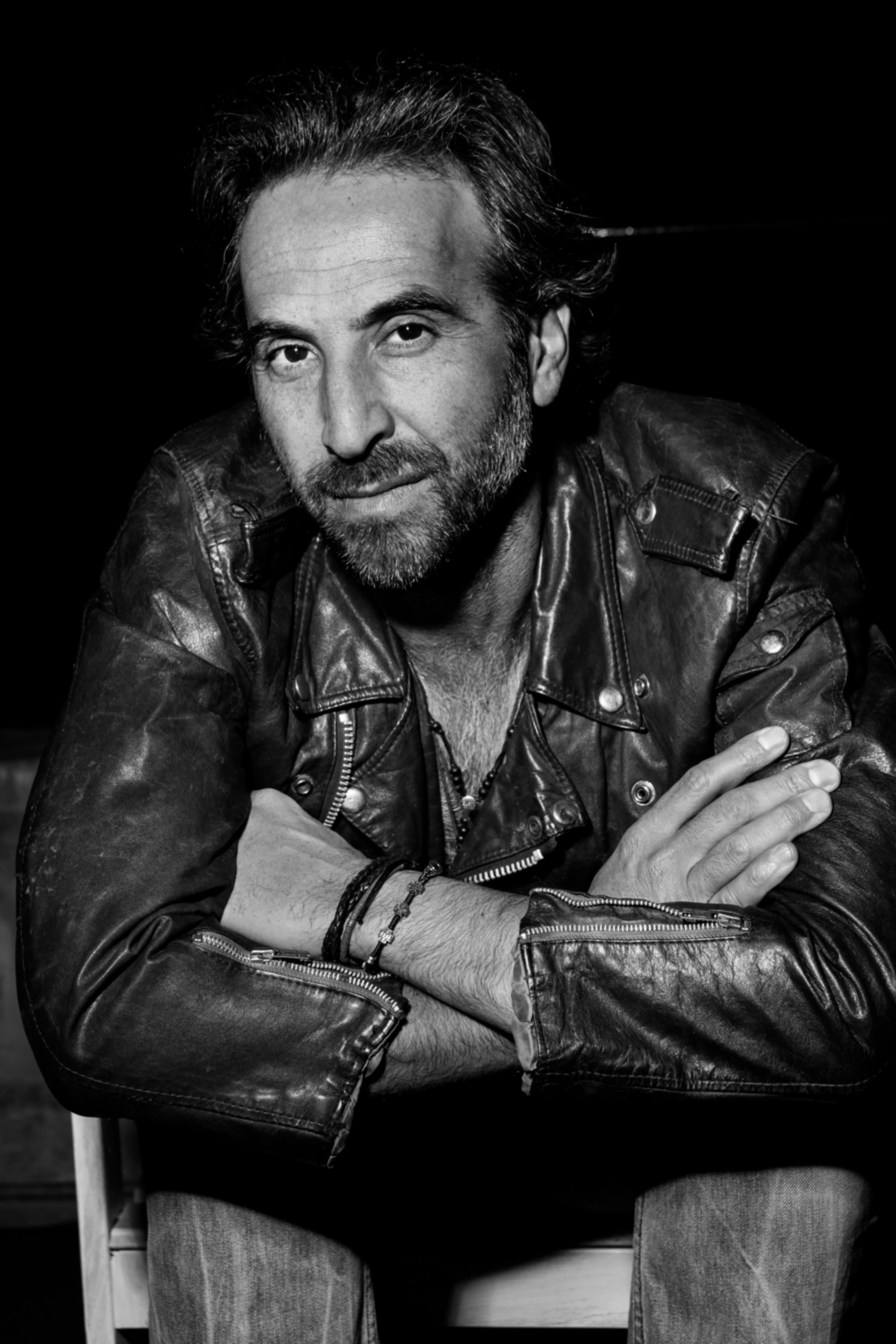
- Born: 1969 (age 56–57)
- Occupations: Entrepreneur; venture capitalist; investment banker
- Spouse: Maria Joana Parizotto (m. 1999 - div. 2014)
- Children: 2

Luca Alessandro Longobardi (born 1969) is an Italian entrepreneur, venture capitalist and investment banker. He gained attention for being wrongfully arrested and spending time in a maximum security prison in Brazil, during which period he became known as "the mafia's banker".

== Early life ==
A native of Naples, Longobardi left home for New York City with $500 at the age of 21 to begin his career. He sold shirts in the streets and spent nights rough sleeping between Grand Central Station and hotels' couches in New York City, a night clubs promoter with the same crew that launched Studio 54, before taking up a job at VTR Capital, a satellite operation of the notorious, now-defunct investment bank Stratton Oakmont, founded by Jordan Belfort.

He then worked at Ladenburg Thalmann, an investment bank owned by Bennett S. LeBow and Carl Icahn and one of the oldest member of the NYSE New York Stock Exchange, with a failed attempt to take over the bank in 1998, he went on to found his own investment banking group State Capital in 1999, opening offices in Italy, Miami, New York and Brazil. Investing during his career in many of the well known tech startups.

== Arrest ==
In August 2010 Longobardi went to the United States consulate in São Paulo to renew his American visa. After the consulate's computer system identified him as a fugitive, and one of the most wanted men in the world, together with Bin Laden, Matteo Messina Denaro, and El Chapo, with a Red Notice issued by Interpol, he was arrested at the Consulate by a 50 men sting operation run by the FBI and the Brazilian Federal police, accusing him of laundering money for the Italian mafia; he later became known in the press as "the mafia's banker". While awaiting extradition to Italy, he was placed in a maximum security prison along with notorious criminals such as Colombian drug lord Pablo Rayo Montaño, Pablo Escobar private pilot together with Barry Seal former United States Marine Corps Captain Pierre Jacques Hernandez Delannoy, Leonardo Badalamenti son of Gaetano Badalamenti one of the most powerful member of the Sicilian mafia, and Italian terrorist Nuclei Armati Rivoluzionari Pierluigi Bragaglia.

== Cleared of charges and subsequent career ==
He was cleared of all charges and released in September 2010 after it emerged that he had nothing to do with crime he was accused for, neither with the mafia.

In 2015, Longobardi self published on Amazon (company) his book Branded "The Mafia's Banker" (Italian: Per tutti ero il banchiere dei clan) documenting his experience during his arrest and time in prison, it became a worldwide bestseller. A video promoting the book was released on YouTube on 22 October 2015, reaching over 1 million views and winning the Best Trailer/Promos award for May 2016 at the Los Angeles Independent Film Festival. In December 2016, Longobardi's short film "An Italian Food Story" won the Best short Inspirational Film award at the Los Angeles Film Awards.

On 17 January 2017 it was announced that Longobardi opened his own restaurant, 108 Garage, in Notting Hill, West London. It became one of London's most acclaimed and awarded restaurants, receiving five star reviews from food critics. Longobardi was named in the world's 100 coolest people list in food and drink by Business Insider.

In 2020 Longobardi returned to the world of finance, launching a new venture capital and a private equity firm and remains active as an investor in blockchain projects.

== Personal life ==
Longobardi was married to Maria Joana Parizotto, who was voted Miss Brazil in 1996 and Miss Nuestra Beleza International in 1997. They have two daughters: Julia and Raffaella.
