= Virginia Slims =

American cigarette brand

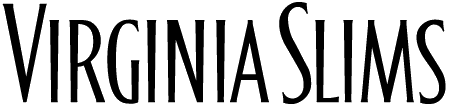
- Product type: Cigarette
- Current owner: Altria
- Produced by: Philip Morris International
- Country: United States
- Introduced: July 22, 1968; 58 years ago
- Markets: See Markets
- Tagline: "You've come a long way, baby."; "It's a woman thing."; "Find your voice."
- Website: virginiaslims.com

Virginia Slims is an American brand of cigarettes owned by Altria. It is manufactured by Philip Morris USA (in the United States) and Philip Morris International (outside the United States).

Virginia Slims are narrower (23 mm (0.91 in) circumference) than standard cigarettes (hence, "Slims"), and are also longer than normal "king-sized" cigarettes (which are 85 mm (3.3 in)). They are sold only in longer 100 and 120 mm (3.9 and 4.7 in) lengths, to afford the cigarettes a more "elegant" appearance and ostensibly to reduce the amount of smoke that they produce. They are also sold in "Superslims", "Gold", and "Silver" varieties. All varieties are available in both menthol and non-menthol flavors. The original packaging was designed by Walter Landor and was white with colored stripes running lengthwise along the left side. In 2016, the packaging design was updated to replace the stripes with a more floral, mottled appearance.

== History ==
Philip Morris introduced Virginia Slims on July 22, 1968 and marketed the brand as a female-oriented spinoff of the company's Benson & Hedges brand. The blends, flavorings, color scheme and overall marketing concepts closely followed the Benson & Hedges model. Early packs (1968-1978) read "Benson and Hedges Park Avenue New York" near the bottom.

The first test market was San Francisco. Originally scheduled for six months, it was cut short after seven weeks because of the success of the introduction. Distribution and marketing was implemented nationwide, and by September 30, 1968, the entire U.S. was covered. Then, in 1976, a 120 mm (4.7 in) full-flavor packing was test-marketed in Fresno, California. Designed to compete with R. J. Reynolds' More brand, the test ultimately failed and the product was withdrawn.

Virginia Slims Lights were successfully introduced in 1978. Although early marketing concepts depicted soft packs, Philip Morris decided to use a box-pack design only. During the 1970s and early 1980s, Virginia Slims Lights' sales were so significant that competitors began introducing their own slim, female-oriented brands (such as American Tobacco Company's Misty, Brown & Williamson's Capri, Liggett's Eve, and R. J. Reynolds' Dawn). In 1984, Virginia Slims Ovals were test-marketed in Rochester, Birmingham and Las Vegas, but were unsuccessful and withdrawn. Ovals were light and had an oval-shaped cross section.

In 1985, Virginia Slims Luxury Lights 120's were introduced - a 120 mm (4.7 in) length packaging intended to better compete with R. J. Reynolds' More brand, as well as other 120's on the market. After successfully test marketing in Portland, Oregon and Nashville, the new style was rolled out nationally. While there was initial concern that 120's might cannibalize customers from other packings (especially Lights), this proved to be unfounded, as the 120's appeared to attract a slightly older demographic. The packing has since become a mainstay of the smoking glamour community. It is arguable as to whether Virginia Slims Luxury Lights 120's are truly "light," as their strength compares closely with that of full-flavor cigarettes.

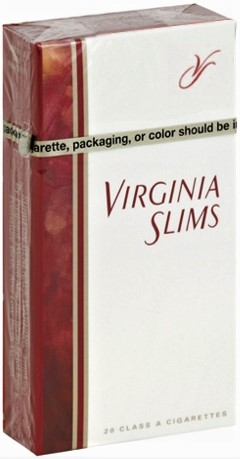
Pack of Virginia Slims cigarettes

In 1987, Ultra Lights 100's were introduced, in keeping with changing consumer tastes, other competitive entries and the Benson & Hedges model. Marginally successful, this packing remains on the market today.

In 1989, Superslims 100's (both menthol and non-menthol) were introduced in response to ultra-thin (21 mm (0.83 in) circumference) competition and consumer demand for an "ultra low-tar" and "low-smoke" product entry. These were also marginally successful, and remain on the market today.

In 1993, a 10-pack version of Lights 100's was introduced, with 10 cigarettes per pack, costing approximately half the price of a 20-pack. This entry had limited success and came under attack from critics; it was ultimately withdrawn.

In 1994, Virginia Slims Kings (85 mm (3.3 in) length) were designed as a discount entry and possibly to compete with other king-size entries such as R. J. Reynolds' Camel brand. It is not clear whether Kings were ever test-marketed, but they were never introduced on a nationwide basis.

In 2003, a box pack was introduced for full flavor 100's in response to consumer demand. This packing is steadily displacing the classic soft pack. Also in 2003, the package graphics were slightly altered, changing the colors and striping along the edge.

In 2004, Luxury Ultra Lights 120's (both menthol and non-menthol) were introduced with marginal success. It is likely that this packing will continue to be supported.

In 2008, Virginia Slims Superslims were introduced in a smaller-sized "Purse Pack."

In 2016, the package graphics for all styles were slightly altered, changing the stripes along the edge to a more mottled and floral-like appearance.

All packings were simultaneously introduced in both menthol and non-menthol varieties. Unlike with most other brands, menthol represents 40–55% of the total sales of Virginia Slims (vs. 25–35% for other brands).

In all, there have been 11 packings introduced or test marketed in the U.S., of which seven remain on the market. There are other varieties marketed in the Asia-Pacific region (including the Philippines, Malaysia, Indonesia, Singapore, Hong Kong, Thailand and Vietnam), Russia and South Africa. Virginia Slims has never had a significant European or South American presence.

== Marketing ==
From inception, Virginia Slims have been designed and marketed as a female-oriented fashion brand, generally targeted to a younger demographic (18- to 35-year-olds). While various themes emerged in the marketing campaigns over the years, the basic threads have been independence, liberation, slimness, attractiveness, glamour, style, taste and a contrast to men's cigarettes. Thus, Virginia Slims functioned to implement a female-centered marketing strategy, also known as femvertising.

A report by the Surgeon General of the United States has interpreted these marketing strategies as attempting to link smoking "to women's freedom, emancipation, and empowerment." This report also tied the increase of smoking among teenage girls to rises in sales of Virginia Slims and other "niche" brands marketed directly to women.

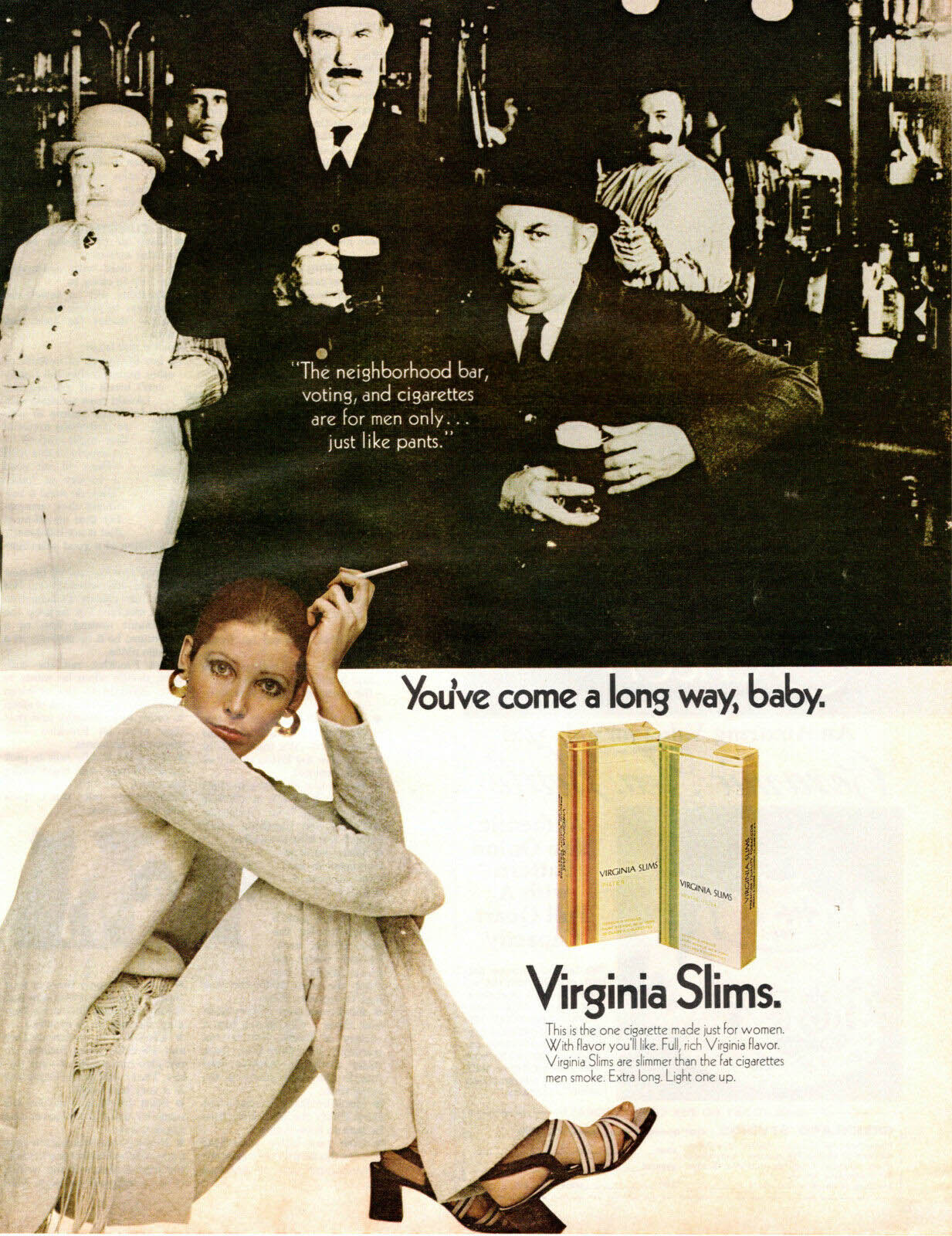
1970 Virginia Slims ad published in a magazine. The legend says "You've come a long way, baby".

In the 1960s and 1970s, the themes of feminism and women's liberation, with the "You've Come a Long Way, Baby" slogan, were often used in advertising for Virginia Slims. These ads often featured anecdotes about women in the early 20th century who were punished for smoking, usually by their husbands or other men, as compared to the present day when women had equal rights such as the right to vote. Later campaigns have used the slogan "It's a Woman Thing" in the 1990s and "Find Your Voice" in the 2000s.

Television and print ads often featured well-known models and designer fashions. Print ads were generally placed in women's magazines, and formed the mainstay of the marketing campaign, supplemented with billboards and point-of-purchase displays. From 1969 until cigarette advertising on television was prohibited in 1971, television advertising was an important component. The commercials would begin with actors in period costumes reenacting the early 20th century anecdotes in comedic fashion, followed by a glamorous modern-day model smoking the product while dressed in the latest fashions, accompanied by "You've Come a Long Way, Baby," an up-tempo, catchy pop-rock jingle:

You've come a long way, baby
To get where you've got to today
You've got your own cigarette now, baby
You've come a long, long way

On January 1, 1971 at 11:59 p.m, an ad for Virginia Slims was aired during The Tonight Show Starring Johnny Carson that became notable as the final cigarette advertisement to air on television before the implementation of the Public Health Cigarette Smoking Act, which prohibited the radio and television advertising of all cigarettes in the United States.

Several other, less important, marketing vehicles were employed, such as the Virginia Slims Book of Days (a day timer/calendar book), fashion shows and an extensive line of products, apparel and accessories.

The "Find Your Voice" ad campaign was criticized as offensive to those who have lost their voices to throat cancer from smoking, especially in light of the well-publicized laryngectomy of Janet Sackman, a former model for another cigarette brand who developed throat and lung cancer. The campaign was an attempt to associate the brand with themes of empowerment, independence, women's rights and sexual allure. The campaign was also criticized for targeting minority women. The campaign was also criticized for the slogan "NEVER let the goody two shoes get you down," which uses reactance to promote product use. It has also been suggested that it urges smokers to disregard health warnings. The campaign also featured a model using a throat-touching gesture, which echoes earlier ads that made more explicit claims of voice box benefits.

The Leo Burnett advertising agency handled the Virginia Slims account throughout most of the product lifetime.

== Market share ==
From its inception until 1978, Virginia Slims saw a steady increase in market share to 1.75% (3.9% of all female smokers). With the introduction of Lights in 1978, the market share increased to 2.5%. Other packings, including 120's, Ultra Lights, and Superslims helped push the market share to a peak of 3.1% (nearly 7% of female smokers) in 1989. With increased competition from other brands, notably Capri and Misty, the brand lost ground but stabilized at around 2.4% though 2003. Since then, it has lost about 0.1% per year, and was 2.0% in 2007 and 1.8% in 2009. This slow but steady decline is expected to continue, since the brand is no longer heavily promoted. Despite this, brand loyalty is well above average, and is still one of the highest in the industry.

== Markets ==
Virginia Slims are mainly sold in the United States, but also were or still are sold in Brazil, Argentina, Germany, France, Switzerland, Portugal, Poland, Hungary, Cyprus, Belarus, Ukraine, Russia, Kazakhstan, Philippines, Singapore, Hong Kong, South Korea and Japan.

== Sponsorship ==
=== Women's tennis ===
Virginia Slims sponsored the Women's Tennis Association (WTA) Tour from 1971 to 1978 and again from 1983 to 1994. This sponsorship is sometimes credited for the growth and success of women's tennis during the 1970s and early 1980s.

Virginia Slims also sponsored the Virginia Slims Circuit, a tennis tour consisting of a group of originally nine female professional players. Formed in 1970, the Virginia Slims Circuit eventually became the basis for the later WTA Tour. The players, dubbed the Original 9, rebelled against the United States Lawn Tennis Association (USLTA) because of the wide inequality between the prize money paid to male and female tennis players.

Magazine publisher and former tennis pro Gladys Heldman, with the assistance of Joe Cullman of Philip Morris, paid $5,000 out of her own pocket to allow the "Original 9" to sign token $1 contracts and set up their own tour of eight professional tournaments in 1970, sponsored by Virginia Slims. This independent women's professional tennis circuit provided more prize money than had been provided previously by the USLTA and other organizations. Despite the USLTA's suspension of the "Original 9" from its tournaments, by the end of the year, the Virginia Slims Circuit was able to boost its numbers from nine to 40 members, which helped pave the way for the first full year season of the circuit in 1971. In the aftermath of the creation of the WTA in 1973, the Virginia Slims Circuit would eventually absorb the ILTF's Women's Grand Prix circuit and become the WTA Tour.

== In popular culture ==
=== Music ===
You've Come a Long Way, Baby is the name of the second album of the electronic musician Fatboy Slim, released in 1998. The Black Lips' song "Dog Years" references Virginia Slims Ultra Lights. Greyson Chance references Virginia Slims as his mother's favorite brand and mentions it multiple times on his 'Portraits' album.

Outkast’s “Elevators (Me and You)” makes specific references to the cigarette and its famous tag line in the last verse, when André 3000 raps, “ Yes, we done come a long way like them slim-ass cigarettes. From Virginia...”

Singer Britney Spears admits in her book The Woman in Me that this is the brand of cigarettes she usually smokes. In chapter 4 of the book she says: "My mom was a typical young Southern mom, often gossiping, always smoking cigarettes with her friends at the bar (she smoked Virginia Slims, the same cigarettes I smoke now) or talking with them on the phone."

=== Television ===
Episode 66 of the animated television show Duckman is titled "You've Come a Wrong Way, Baby" and its plot involves the tobacco industry.
