= Sharran Srivatsaa =

American entrepreneur and public speaker

- Sharran Srivatsaa
- Education: Luther College; Vanderbilt University
- Occupations: Entrepreneur, investor
- Known for: Chief executive officer of Acquisition.com

Sharran Srivatsaa is an American entrepreneur and investor who is the chief executive officer of Acquisition.com. He previously served as president of Teles Properties and The Real Brokerage.

== Education ==
Srivatsaa graduated from Luther College in 2001 with a bachelor's degree in computer science. He subsequently earned a Master of Business Administration from Vanderbilt University.

== Career ==
=== Finance and real estate ===
Earlier in his career, Srivatsaa held investment advisory and corporate strategy positions at Goldman Sachs and Credit Suisse.

Srivatsaa served as president of Teles Properties, a Southern California real estate brokerage acquired by Douglas Elliman in 2017. In 2018, he founded Kingston Lane, a marketing software platform for real estate agents and brokers. He also served as principal of Srilo Ventures, an investment fund focused on technology companies and consumer businesses.

=== The Real Brokerage ===
On December 12, 2022, The Real Brokerage announced Srivatsaa's appointment as president, effective immediately. The newly created position included responsibility for the company's growth, agent recruitment and education.

In December 2024, Real Estate News included Srivatsaa in “The Ten”, its annual selection of industry newsmakers.

In March 2025, the company announced that Srivatsaa would leave the presidency and join its board of directors, effective June 1, subject to corporate approvals. The company stated that it did not plan to appoint a replacement president.

=== Acquisition.com ===
In June 2025, Acquisition.com announced Srivatsaa's appointment as president, with responsibilities including oversight of the firm's business and investment strategy.

In March 2026, Srivatsaa became chief executive officer of Acquisition.com as Leila Hormozi moved to chairwoman.

== Other activities ==
Srivatsaa hosts the podcast Business School and created the 5am Club, a morning conference call for entrepreneurs.
