= Howard Lorber =

American businessman and investor (born 1948)

Howard Mark Lorber
- Born: September 8, 1948 (age 78); Bronx, New York
- Education: Long Island University
- Occupations: CEO of Vector Group; Chairman of Douglas Elliman; Chairman of Nathan's Famous
- Spouse: Thea Hallman
- Children: 2 sons
- Parent(s): Charles Lorber; Celia Benrubi Lorber

Howard Mark Lorber (born September 8, 1948) is an American businessman and investor.

== Early life and education ==
Lorber was born to a Jewish family in The Bronx, the son of Charles and Celia (née Benrubi) Lorber but grew up in Paramus, New Jersey. He attended Long Island University where he is currently on the board of trustees. Lorber Hall was named in his honor. While he was in college, Lorber joined The Alpha Epsilon Pi fraternity.

== Career ==
He is the president and CEO of Vector Group Ltd., a holding company. He is also the chairman of Douglas Elliman, a subsidiary of Vector, which is the largest residential real estate brokerage in the New York metropolitan area with 4,000 brokers as of 2014 (and an additional 300 in Florida).

Lorber is chairman of fast food chain Nathan's Famous.

In May 2010, he became a member of the Board of Directors at Borders

== Personal life ==
He is married to Thea Hallman. His son Michael Lorber is a real estate broker at Douglas Elliman and was featured on Million Dollar Listing New York. Lorber served as one of the top economic advisers to Donald Trump's 2016 presidential campaign.
