= Richard Watts Jr. =

American theatre critic (1898–1981)

- Born: January 12, 1898; Parkersburg, West Virginia, U.S.
- Died: January 2, 1981 (aged 82); Manhattan, New York, U.S.
- Education: Columbia University
- Occupations: Theatre critic; war correspondent; foreign correspondent

Richard Watts Jr. (January 12, 1898 – January 2, 1981) was an American theatre critic for the New York Herald Tribune and the New York Post. He was a war and foreign correspondent from the Spanish Civil War until the end of World War II.

== Early life ==
Richard Watts was born on January 12, 1898, in Parkersburg, West Virginia. He studied at Columbia University from 1917 to 1921.

== Career ==
In 1922, Watts joined the Brooklyn Times as a reporter. In 1924, Watts joined the New York Herald. He served as its motion picture critic until 1936. In 1936, Watts succeeded Percy Hammond as drama critic for the New York Herald Tribune. He continued in that role until 1942.

Watts was a foreign correspondent. From 1937 to 1938, he reported on the Spanish Civil War and from 1938 to 1939, he reported on the Far East for the Herald Tribune. He reported on Nazi activities in Ecuador and Colombia. In 1941, he was a war correspondent for four months in China, Burma, the Netherlands, East Indies and Malaya. In 1942, Watts was appointed chief of the United States Office of War Information in Dublin, Ireland. He edited American Letters, a weekly publication by the Office of War Information. He was press attaché for the American legation in Dublin. He reported in Dublin until 1943. In 1944, he reported in Chongqing and was press attaché to Joseph Stilwell in China.

After returning from the war, Watts returned to work as a drama critic at the New York Post and reviewed daily from 1946 to 1974. He then wrote a Saturday column of criticism until his retirement in 1976. He also wrote a regular column entitled "Random Notes on This and That." He is also credited for lending his name and voice to a Fatima Cigarette commercial for the radio show "Dragnet".

== Personal life ==
Watts was a bachelor. He lived in Manhattan.

Watts had a stroke in late 1980 and was in a coma. He died of cardiac arrest on January 2, 1981, at Mount Sinai Hospital in Manhattan. His funeral was held at Frank E. Campbell Funeral Chapel.
