= Vector Group =

American diversified holding company

Vector Group Ltd.
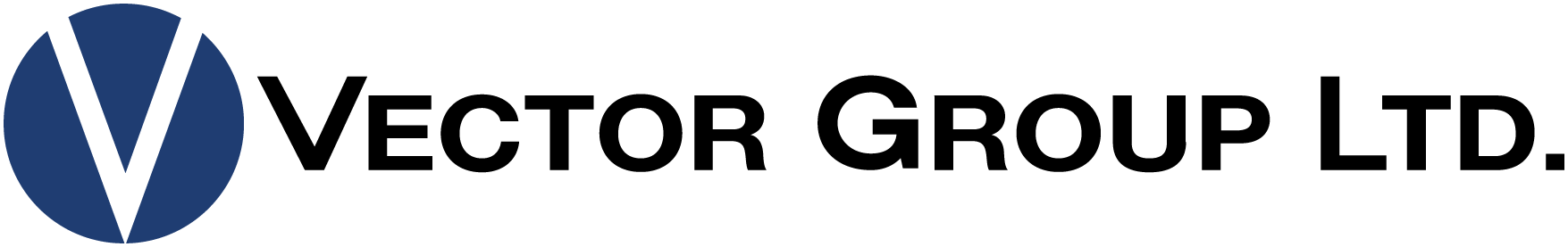
- Company type: Subsidiary
- Traded as: NYSE: VGR
- Industry: Diversified holding
- Genre: Holding company
- Founded: 1986 (40 years ago).
- Founder: Bennett S. LeBow
- Headquarters: Miami, Florida, U.S.
- Key people: Bennett S. LeBow (chairman); Howard Lorber (president and CEO); Richard Lampen (Executive Vice President); J. Bryant Kirkland III (Senior Vice President, Chief Financial Officer and Treasurer); Marc N. Bell (Senior Vice President, General Counsel and Secretary)
- Products: Tobacco, real estate, property management
- Revenue: $2.02 billion (FY 2020)
- Net income: $92.5 million (FY 2020)
- Total assets: $1.34 billion (FY 2020)
- Number of employees: 1,007
- Parent: Japan Tobacco
- Subsidiaries: Liggett Group LLC; New Valley LLC; Vector Tobacco
- Website: vectorgroupltd.com

Vector Group Ltd. was an American diversified holding company with two major businesses: Liggett Group (tobacco) and New Valley (real estate). In August 2024, Vector Group agreed to be acquired by Japan Tobacco (JT Group) to become a wholly owned consolidated subsidiary of JT. The deal was completed in October 2024.

Bennett S. LeBow founded Vector Group in 1986. Since then, he has served as Chairman. Howard Lorber has served as the Company's President and Chief Executive Officer since 1994. Vector Group was previously called Brooke Group.

== Holdings ==
=== Subsidiaries ===
Founded in 1873, Liggett Group is the fourth-largest cigarette manufacturer in the U.S. Liggett operates in the discount cigarette market. As of March 31, 2019, Liggett's family of brands represented a 14% share of the discount market. Its core brands include: Pyramid, Grand Prix, Liggett Select, Eve, Eagle 20's, and Montego. Vector Tobacco is engaged in the manufacture of conventional cigarettes, based in North Carolina.

New Valley LLC (formerly known as Western Union) is a diversified real estate company that acquires or invests in real estate properties or projects. It has invested in more than 30 real estate projects as of March 31, 2019.

New Valley previously owned 100 percent of Douglas Elliman, the largest residential real estate brokerage firm in the New York metropolitan area and fourth-largest residential brokerage firm in the U.S. In December 2021, Vector Group completed the spin-off of Douglas Elliman into a standalone, publicly traded company.

== Office locations ==
Vector Group and New Valley's headquarters are in Miami, Florida and they have an additional office in New York, New York.

== See also ==
- List of Florida companies
