= Georgette Klinger =

Moravian-born American businesswoman and cosmetologist

- Born: Georgette Eckstein; February 28, 1915; Brno, Moravia, Austria-Hungary
- Died: January 9, 2004 (aged 88); New York City, New York, United States
- Occupations: Businesswoman; Cosmetologist
- Years active: 1938–1998
- Spouses: Frank Klinger (m. 1938; div. 1946) Jacobo Eisenberg (m. 1949; died 1976)
- Children: 1

Georgette Klinger (née Eckstein; February 28, 1915 – January 9, 2004) was a Moravian-born American businesswoman and cosmetologist who founded skin care brand Georgette Klinger Inc. in New York City in 1941. Born into a wealthy family in Brno, Moravia, she became interested in beauty care after developing an acne rash from applying cosmetic products she won at a beauty contest. Klinger opened her first salon in 1938 before closing it a year later so she and her family could flee abroad when the Nazi Party invaded Czechoslovakia.

She formed her business from a bank loan of $15,000 and expanded it to operating nine salons by the time of its sale to a financial and investment firm in 1998. Klinger devised the first specialized treatment programs for teenagers in 1967 before expanding it to men five years later. She co-authored a book with Barbara Rowes in 1979, and was invited to join The Committee of 200 in 1982. Klinger's salons have been cited by experts as a precursor to the multi-billion spa industry, and she brought European-style female skin care to the United States.

== Biography ==
Klinger was born in Brno, Moravia, Austria-Hungary (now the Czech Republic) on February 28, 1915. She was the third child and the sole daughter of textile manufacturer Benno Eckstein and gardener and weaver Ilona Eckstein (née Rosenthal). Klinger had three brothers, was raised in a wealthy family, who owned a summer home in Brno to entertain foreign visitors. She was educated in cosmetic chemistry in schools in Budapest, Vienna, and Paris, before she won a beauty contest in her homeland aged 18. The cosmetic products Klinger won irritated her skin, and gave her a breakout that caused a persistent acne rash. Klinger's mother took her to a professor of dermatology in Vienna, and the two women ventured to other cities for a period of two years for treatment, which was initially unsuccessful. She had listened to the professor of dermatology, by learning the business side of beauty care in Budapest and Prague, and cured herself.

In 1938, Klinger withstood the objections from the family of her husband about working, and she and a local doctor opened her first skin care salon in her hometown of Brno. Because of her young age, she wore spectacles and tied her hair into a bun to make her appear older to customers. When the Nazi Party of Adolf Hitler invaded Czechoslovakia in 1939, Klinger and her family fled to London by providing authorities with exit visas. In London, she established a costume jewelry business, which she later relinquished to a friend of hers; she worked secretly to liberate Czechoslovakia during World War II. She emigrated to New York City on an empty troop ship in 1941, after the bombing of London became severe. Klinger had no money; she found adjusting to life in the United States difficult at first due to the country's sense of humor and cried when she was called "honey" by others. She had an uncle who resided in Great Neck, New York; he, the wife of a publisher, and a broker helped Klinger secure a bank loan of $15,000, with the belief her methodology would prove effective.

The bank loan allowed her to open a shop called Georgette Klinger Inc. at 509 Madison Avenue, Manhattan; she created her projects from fresh and natural ingredients with herbs and fruits in her kitchen during the early years of her career. Klinger was one of the first to advise against exposure to the sun to prevent premature aging, told clients to consume extra water, not to use soap to clean themselves, to eschew hairspray, and avoid applying a large amount of make-up as used in Hollywood beauty. She connected air pollution and smoking to poor skin care. avoided products tested on animals, employed personnel who had been trained in Europe, and wore a magnifying glass on her neck. She visited her stores regularly, provided equal treatment to her customers regardless of their social class, and published a small amount of advertising due to a partial dislike of large wording. preferring word of mouth. Klinger moved the flagship store to 501 Madison Avenue in 1959, and opened a second salon in the Los Angeles suburb of Beverly Hills ten years later. She devised the first specialized treatment programs for teenagers in 1967 and men five years later.

Klinger stated to The Cincinnati Enquirer in 1984 that she was the first skin care specialist to introduce elasticity-saving collagen protein in the United States and the first to produce perfume-free products. She trademarked the company name in 1977, and ran four salons in the United States by 1979. That same year, she and Barbara Rowes co-authored Georgette Klinger’s Skincare to talk about her skin care methodology. In October 1981, Klinger received the Eye Research Institute of the Retina Foundation's inaugural Woman of Vision Award, and in 1982 was invited to join The Committee of 200, which was composed of businesswomen who ran businesses with an annual turnover of $5 million. She established a factory and laboratory in New Jersey to expand the manufacture of her products to a wide scale in 1982. Klinger's company reported annual revenues of $20 million by the early 1990s, and had a mail order section. After repeatedly declining offers to sell her business to larger firms since the 1970s, she sold it to Madison, Wisconsin-based financial and investment firm Pyle Group in 1998, by which time had nine salons.

== Personal life ==
Klinger married lawyer Frank Klinger in 1938 and divorced in around 1946. Her second marriage to Venezuelan businessperson Jacobo Eisenberg in 1949 until his death in 1976 led to the birth of a daughter, Kathryn, in 1951. Kathryn joined her mother's business soon after graduating from college in 1970. Klinger became a naturalised citizen of the United States on an unknown date. She died from natural causes caused by a decline in her health at Lenox Hill Hospital, New York City on January 9, 2004. A service for Klinger was held at Frank E. Campbell Funeral Chapel, Manhattan on January 11, and is buried in Ferncliff Cemetery, Hartsdale.

== Personality and legacy ==
The Ottawa Citizen described Klinger in her later years as "a silver-haired woman with soft sloping gray eyes and luminous porcelain skin", and "a quietly elegant woman". Her Eastern European accent caused her to pronounce Ws as Vs, such as "vomen's skin needs vauhter", was fluent in seven languages. and admired opera. She was known to scrutinize her employees, and was a perfectionist. Maureen O'Sullivan of Palm Beach Daily News noted Klinger did not "sugar coat her assessments" and provided staff with support and assistance. She mandated salon facialists to sport white uniforms and call customers "Miss" to create calmness. Her public image was one of her being rarely seen without sporting a hat, and preferred to wear uncomfortable shoes.

Called the "Dean of Skin Care", her salons became a precursor of the multi-billion dollar spa industry, brought European-style female skin care to the United States, and according to O'Sullivan, introduced scientific skin care to the country. Douglas Martin of The New York Times wrote Klinger's approach of treating the skin "as a tender, living organ, not a surface in need of decoration" had "revolutionized cosmetic skin care."
