= Smoking fetishism =

Fetishism

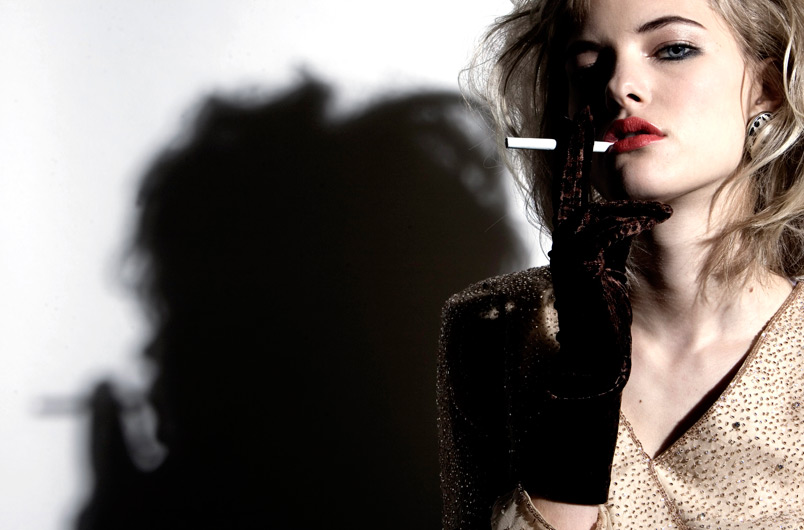
An example of fashion photography involving cigarettes

Smoking fetishism (also known as capnolagnia) is a sexual fetish based on the pulmonary consumption (smoking) of tobacco, most often via cigarettes, cigars, cannabis and also pipes, vapes, and hookahs to some extent. As a fetish, its mechanisms regard sexual arousal from the smell, observation or imagination of a person smoking, sometimes including oneself.

== Background ==
Capnolagnia is not considered a disease but an unusual sexual practice, and many of the fetishists do not seek medical help unless this behavior strongly interferes with their daily lives. The majority of people simply learn to accept their fetish and manage to achieve gratification in an appropriate manner.

A 2003 study found that the fetish was not previously the subject of academic study but had been mentioned in "a few newspapers".

== Causes ==
Like any fetish, the causes and mechanisms of a smoking fetish vary widely, with roots of sexual association in early childhood and adolescence. Typical causes and hypotheses include:

- aesthetics: mere attraction to, and gratification of, the visual aspect of smoke as it exits the mouth
- childhood: experience or interaction with one or more attractive smoking individuals during childhood
- impulsivity: perceived symbolism of an audacious or impulsive personality, insinuating promiscuity
- mannerism: masculine or feminine body language of smokers
- media: early exposure to sexualized depictions of smokers, especially from advertising media, the film noir era, and pornography
- persuasion: perceived power of convincing or urging another individual to smoke
- psychosexual development: phenomena in the oral and phallic stages of childhood development, based on Freudian theory
- sadomasochism: pleasure from infliction of bodily harm caused by smoking, often called "lung damage"
- self-confidence: perceived confidence or masculinity of the smoker, regarding taboo or wealth
- taboo: perceived independence or rebellion regarding the act of smoking, amongst cultural adversity to smokers
- wealth: attraction to individuals who are wealthy enough to fund a cigarette or cigar habit

== In the adult industry ==
Smoking has often been associated with the dominatrix role in BDSM, and numerous adult production for the kink community feature scenes depicting smoking and other acts related to it, such as extinguishing cigarettes on characters or forcing characters to inhale the smoke. Over the years, numerous studios formed, which specialize in producing adult material aimed mainly at smoking fetishists. Some of the studios also offer custom-made productions catering to sub-fetishes, such as a smoking female extinguishing a cigarette on the leather seats of a luxury car.

== Diagnosis ==
The diagnostic criteria for fetishism are:

- Unusual sexual fantasies, drives or behavior occur over a time span of at least six months. Sometimes unusual sexual fantasies occur and vanish by themselves; in this case any medical treatment is not necessary.
- The affected person, their object or another person experience impairment or distress in multiple functional areas. Functional area refers to different aspects of life such as private social contacts, job, etc. It is sufficient for the diagnosis if one of the participants is being hurt or mistreated in any other way.

People who experience one or more of the symptoms below are considered to have a smoking fetish:

- Sexual interest in smoking or watching other people smoking.
- Recurring intense sexual fantasies involving smoking or watching other people smoking.
- Recurring intense sexual urges involving smoking or watching other people smoking.

== See also ==
- Fashion cigarettes
- Sensual play
