= Fashion cigarettes =

Marketing of cigarettes towards women

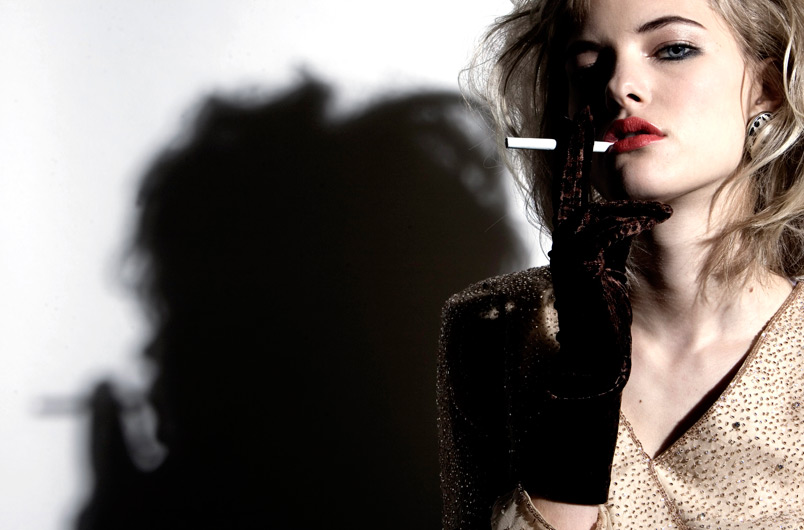
An example of fashion photography involving cigarettes.

Historically considered a masculine habit, the feminization of smoking occurred in tandem with the advent of fashion brands or premium brands of cigarettes specifically marketed toward women. Most often this is focused on young fashion-conscious professional ladies who are the target demographic for these brands, which are differentiated by slimness and added length over traditional brands of cigarettes. This development of the female market occurred in tandem with an expansion of the "luxury cigarette" concept aimed at men and women, through the appearance of "luxury, opulence and sophistication" of packaging.

== Description ==
These brands include decorative ones like Eve, marketed strictly toward women like Virginia Slims, or as evening-out styles like Sobranie Cocktail, designed to appeal to women, and their counterpart Sobranie Black Russian, the darker colours of which targeted a male market.

Many fashion houses have lent their name (through a licensing agreement) to cigarettes; Yves Saint Laurent is arguably the most successful of these (even though he admitted in a 1968 interview he smokes, but not his namesake brand, as he does "not like the flavour"), though many other brands have been marketed, from time to time, in select international markets: Givenchy, Versace, Pierre Cardin, Christian Lacroix and Cartier (a jewelry house).

In the 1980s and early 1990s, one manufacturer, Nat Sherman created longer, 164-millimeter versions of several cigarettes. However, finding only a small niche market, the machines that produced them have since been dismantled when it came to replace them.

With the anti-smoking movement in the United States, cigarette manufacturers have turned to Asia, where there is a distinct market for female-oriented brands, and to the nouveau riche in Russia.

== See also ==
- Health effects of tobacco
- Women and smoking
- Smoking fetishism
- Capri
- Cigarillo
- Djarum
- Gudang Garam
- Dunhill
- More
- Virginia Slims
- Nat Sherman
