= Bennett S. LeBow =

American businessman and philanthropist

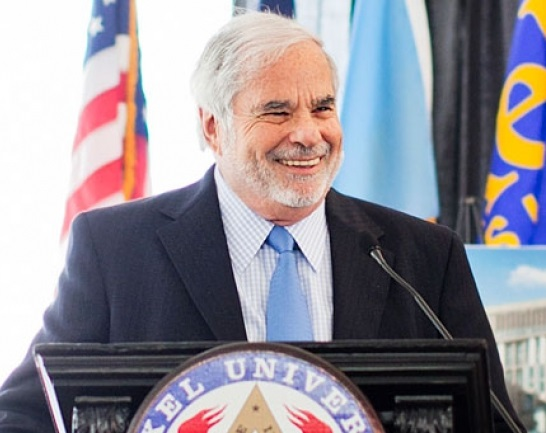
- Education: Drexel University (BS)
- Occupation: Businessman
- Known for: Chairman of the board of Vector Group
- Spouses: Geraldine Cosher LeBow (until 2011); Jacqueline Finkelstein LeBow (2014–present)
- Children: 2

Bennett S. LeBow is an American businessman and philanthropist. He is the founder and chairman of the board of Vector Group. After LeBow acquired the cigarette manufacturer Liggett Group in 1986, the company became involved in anti-tobacco lawsuits culminating in the 1998 Tobacco Master Settlement Agreement.

== Early life and education ==
LeBow's father, Martin, was a life insurance salesman and his mother, Suara (née Weiss), was a teacher. He graduated from West Philadelphia High School, and in 1960 earned a degree in electrical engineering from Drexel University. LeBow then went on to graduate school at Princeton University. Before completing his degree, LeBow left Princeton and joined the army where he installed early data systems at the Pentagon.

== Career ==
LeBow's first foray into business occurred in the 1960s, when he started a computer company to continue his Pentagon project. LeBow sold the business in 1971, and became a full-time investor. In 1980, he founded the investment holding company Brooke Group Ltd. LeBow went on to purchase many companies including Western Union, Information Displays, MAI Basic Four, Liggett Group, Brigham's Ice Cream, and SkyBox International. In 2000, Brooke Group Ltd. was renamed to Vector Group Ltd.

In 1984, LeBow completed the sale of Information Displays, which subsequently went bankrupt. The buyer sued LeBow and his partners for fraud and misrepresentation. In 1986, he purchased the fifth-largest cigarette manufacturer in the United States, the Liggett Group, for $140 million. In 1987, Liggett bought a majority stake in Western Union, which had a negative net worth of $200 million. The company, then renamed New Valley LLC, eventually filed for bankruptcy but was able to pay its bondholders in full via asset sales. Liggett later sold its remaining interest in Western Union Financial Services Inc for $1.2 billion, earning it a $300 million profit. In 1994, LeBow was sued by his shareholders, who claimed he had taken millions of dollars in improper loans; LeBow settled out of court." In 1995, he teamed up with corporate raider Carl Icahn to make a bid for RJR Nabisco. The bid was rejected by shareholders, who were skeptical due to LeBow's "dubious reputation as a manager."

In May 2010, after a $25 million investment, he became a member of the board of directors at Borders and was immediately elected chairman of the board, replacing Mick McGuire, who resigned. In June 2010, LeBow became CEO of Borders Group Inc. In February 2011, Borders declared bankruptcy.

LeBow is chairman of the board of Vector Group, the holding company for Liggett Group, Vector Tobacco, New Valley LLC, and Douglas Elliman. He owns over 150,000 units of Vector stock, worth $7.5 million.

=== Tobacco industry and litigation ===
LeBow purchased the Liggett Group for $140 million in 1986. In 1993, LeBow stated under sworn testimony that whether cigarettes cause cancer is irrelevant, since cigarettes are a legal product and people choose to use them. In 1996, while under his leadership, Liggett Group broke ranks with the rest of the US tobacco industry, including Philip Morris, Brown and Williamson, RJR Nabisco, Loews and Lorillard, when he announced that Liggett would settle the Medicaid tobacco suits brought by forty state attorneys general.

Liggett had previously been accused of being illegally influenced by Philip Morris, which allegedly paid some of Liggett's legal bills in order to buy its cooperation in anti-tobacco lawsuits. LeBow stated that the reason for the settlement was to obtain immunity for Liggett from future liabilities and to prevent a future bankruptcy. The settlement entailed that Liggett agree to pay $1 million in damages; publicly announce that smoking is addictive and causes cancer; turn over long-secret tobacco industry documents; disclose ingredients in its cigarettes; and testify against the industry. Liggett was the first cigarette company to voluntarily put the label "Nicotine is Addictive" on their product.

LeBow was honored with a proclamation by Florida governor Lawton Chiles for his "invaluable assistance" in helping the state achieve its $11.3 billion settlement with the tobacco industry.

According to court documents, Liggett, while under LeBow's leadership, "engage[d] in marketing tactics that appeal to youths, such as couponing, sampling, and 'buy one get one free' offers for its cigarettes, and advertise[d] in magazines with substantial youth readership."

Through Vector Tobacco Inc., LeBow developed the nicotine-free cigarette Quest, a cigarette designed to aid in smoking cessation.

In 2005, LeBow resigned from the Dana–Farber Cancer Institute Board of Trustees shortly after his appointment over discussions about the propriety of associating with the owner of a company which sells products that are known to cause cancer.

== Philanthropy and political activity ==
LeBow is a large supporter of his alma mater, Drexel University. In 1998, Drexel's College of Business and Administration was named the Bennett S. LeBow College of Business in his honor after LeBow made a $10 million donation to the university. LeBow also endowed the Bennett S. LeBow Engineering Center, a facility that houses Drexel's College of Engineering. In November 2010, LeBow contributed $45 million for the construction of a new facility for the LeBow College of Business, the 12th largest gift to any US business school and the biggest ever to Drexel University. The new facility, which was finished in 2013, was named Gerri C. LeBow Hall in honor of LeBow's late wife Geraldine. In 2011, LeBow was named the nation's 23rd largest charitable donor by The Chronicle of Philanthropy for donating more than $49 million to charitable causes.

From 1993 to 1996, LeBow and his wife Geraldine donated more than $65,000 to Democratic candidates. In 1995, LeBow invited Vadim Rabinovich to a Clinton–Gore fundraiser in Miami, though this did not become public knowledge until 1997. Rabinovich was alleged to have ties to Russian organized crime, with American journalist Robert I. Friedman describing Rabinovich as a "Ukrainian mob boss". A spokesman for LeBow said that, at the time of the fundraiser, LeBow was unaware of Rabinovich's alleged ties to organized crime. Rabinovich said he did not donate money to the fundraiser. According to a spokesman for LeBow in 1997, LeBow's Brooke Group and Rabinovich were participating in the development of a business center and luxury hotel in Kyiv. In 2009, LeBow made a $10,000 campaign contribution to Manhattan District Attorney candidate Leslie Crocker Snyder, whose law firm – Kasowitz, Benson, Torres & Friedman – had represented the Liggett Group in smoking and health litigation since 1996. According to CNN, LeBow was a "substantial donor" to Donald Trump's 2016 presidential campaign.

== Personal life ==
LeBow is Jewish. LeBow was first married to Geraldine Cosher whom he met while they were college students (he was at Drexel and she attended Temple University). They had two daughters. Geraldine died in 2011 after 52 years of marriage. Bennett subsequently married Jacqueline Finkelstein of JSF Capital.

In 1989, Brooke Yachts International Ltd. (which LeBow bought for $4 million when the shipyard encountered financial issues) finished Lebow's $21 million yacht. The yacht, which was 177 feet (54 m) long, was considered one of the ten largest private yachts in 1993.

LeBow owned property on Fisher Island in Florida. The penthouse, which was bought by Geraldine for $4.25 million in 1995, was sold in 2020 for $15 million. In 2016, LeBow bought an 8,000-square-foot (740 m^{2}), five-bedroom unit on the 64th floor of 432 Park Avenue in New York City for $44.8 million.

== See also ==
- List of tobacco-related topics
