= Andrew Lanyi =

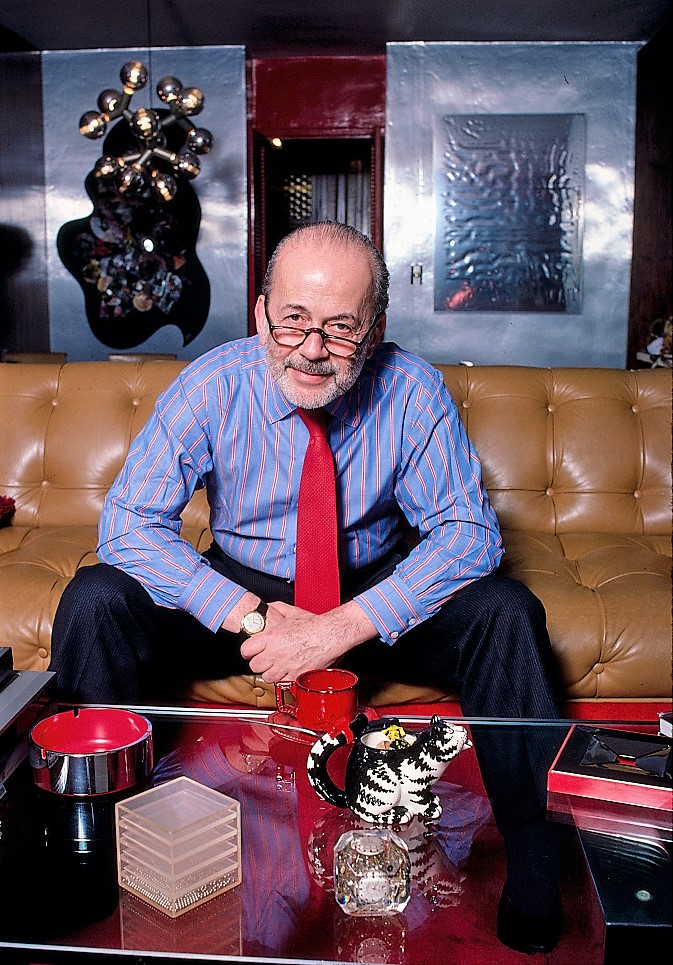
- Lanyi in 1984
- Born: Andrew A. Lanyi; May 27, 1925; Budapest, Hungary
- Died: August 4, 2009 (aged 84); New York, NY
- Education: Eötvös Loránd University
- Occupations: Stock broker, Analyst, Investor, Author

Andrew A. Lanyi (May 27, 1925 – August 4, 2009) was a well renowned stock broker, analyst, World War II forced labourer, investor and author who became one of the most successful and well known stock brokers of the 20th century.

== Biography ==
Lanyi was born to a Jewish family in Budapest, Hungary. During World War II, he was forced to a work as a laborer building airfields for the German Luftwaffe before escaping from captivity. After the war, Lanyi worked as a director of plays in Budapest and then as a radio director where he was known as the "Ed Sullivan" of Hungarian radio. He and his pregnant wife fled to Austria during the Hungarian Revolution wife and the couple applied for asylum in the United States. His application was granted and he moved to New Jersey and accepted a job with The New York Times. He also sold mutual funds at night and later stocks to make ends meet; he initially focused on selling to Hungarian names in the phone book and honed his skills becoming one of the top cold-calling stockbrokers in the industry despite his thick Hungarian accent.

Andrew started his career at Blythe Eastman Dillon and went on to work at Lehman Brothers, Ladenburg Thalmann and Oppenheimer. He retired as Executive Director of Investments of the Lanyi Group, his own group, at Oppenheimer and Co. Inc. in 2007. He was frequently interviewed for many financial publications, including Gene Marcial's Inside Wall Street column at BusinessWeek. Many of Andrew's alumni went on to achieve successful careers, including Cody Willard, former business anchor and co-host of Happy Hour on Fox Business.

== Personal life ==
Lanyi married twice. He married Valerie Lanyi in Austria; they had two children: George (1957-1990), and Paul. They divorced in the 1990s. In 1993, he married Diane Bickoff. On August 4, 2009, he died from liver cancer at his home in Manhattan. Services were held at Frank E. Campbell Funeral Chapel.
