= Frank E. Campbell Funeral Chapel =

Funeral home in Manhattan, New York

Coordinates: 40.7779°N 73.9613°W

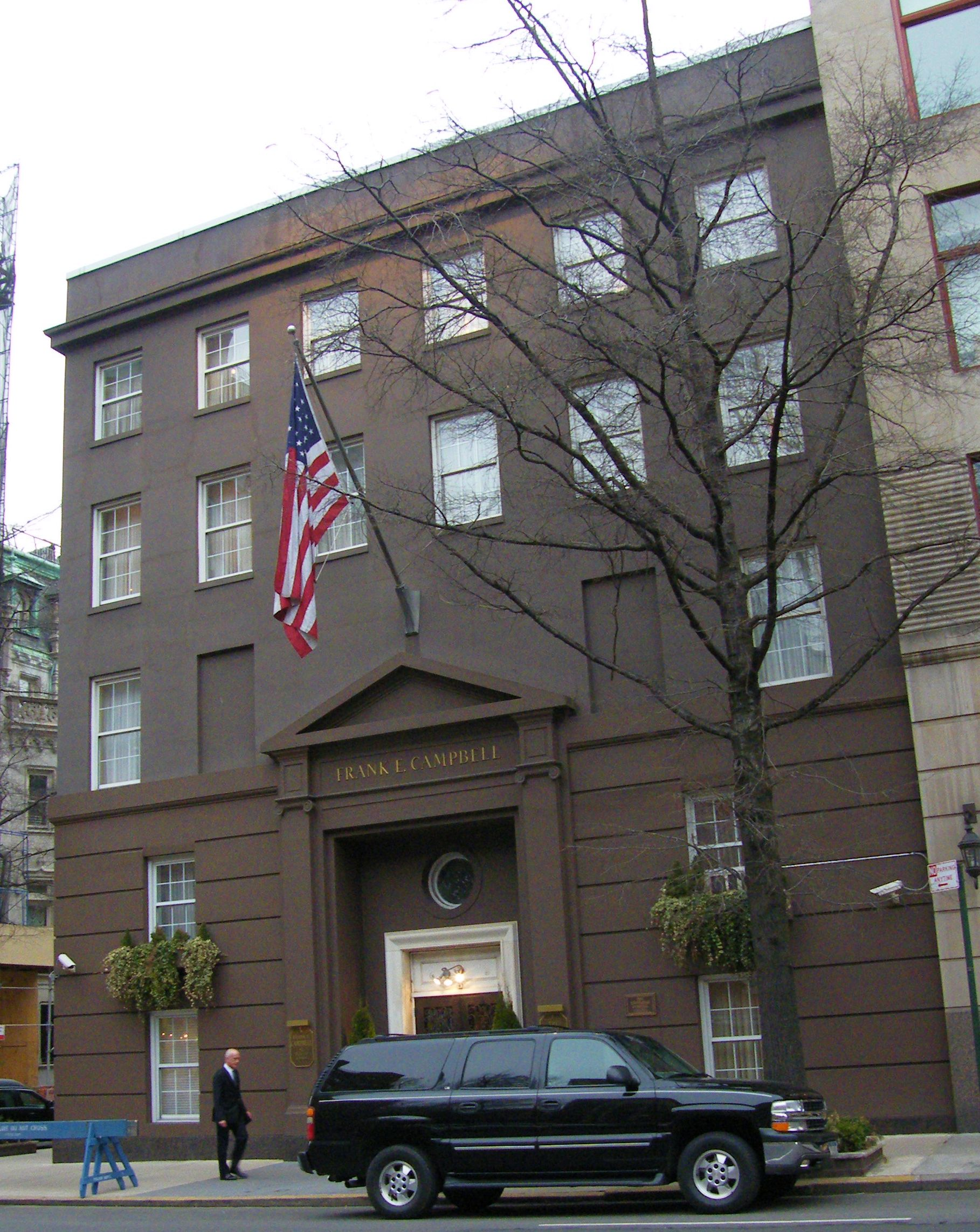
Frank E. Campbell Funeral Chapel on Madison Avenue at 81st Street in Manhattan

The Frank E. Campbell Funeral Chapel is a funeral home located on Madison Avenue at 81st Street in Manhattan. Founded in 1898 as Frank E. Campbell Burial and Cremation Company, the company is now owned by Service Corporation International. Frank E. Campbell is known for handling many celebrity deaths and funerals as well as memorial services including those of John Lennon, Jacqueline Kennedy Onassis, Rudolph Valentino, Arturo Toscanini, Judy Garland, Joan Crawford, Heath Ledger, Aaliyah, The Notorious B.I.G. and Tommy Dorsey.

== History ==
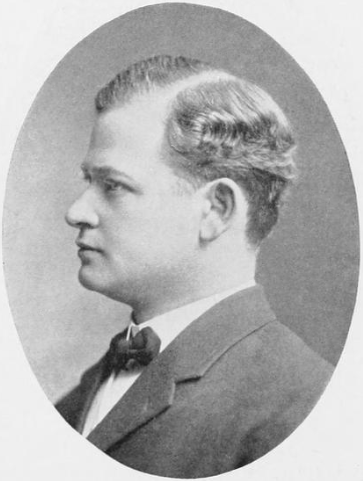
Frank E. Campbell

Frank E. Campbell, the founder of the business, was born on July 4, 1872, in Camp Point, Illinois. He moved to New York around 1892, and married Amelia Klutz in 1898, setting himself up as an undertaker near Twenty-Third Street and Eighth Avenue in Manhattan. His innovations in the business included the use of a funeral chapel, which he felt was preferable to having the services in the home of the deceased; advertising, which had previously been rare among undertakers, and the use of cars instead of horse-drawn carriages as hearses. Campbell died on January 19, 1934, of heart disease.

== Notable funerals and memorial services ==
- Aaliyah
- Amsale Aberra
- Elizabeth Arden
- Roscoe "Fatty" Arbuckle
- Harold Arlen
- Pedro Armendáriz, Jr.
- Arthur Ashe
- Isaac Asimov
- Arleen Auger
- Antônio Carlos Jobim
- Herman Badillo
- Lauren Bacall
- George Ballanchine
- Bernard Baruch
- Jean-Michel Basquiat
- Irving Berlin
- Peter Boyle
- Clare A. Briggs
- Yul Brynner
- Lord Buckley
- Anne Burrell
- James Cagney
- James Kenneth Campbell
- Milt Caniff
- Emilio Carranza
- Harry Carman
- Oleg Cassini
- Bennett Cerf
- Huguette Clark
- Montgomery Clift
- William Sloane Coffin
- George M. Cohan
- Frank Costello
- Joan Crawford
- Walter Cronkite
- Celia Cruz
- Mario Cuomo
- Candy Darling
- Clive Davis
- Jack Dempsey
- Thomas E. Dewey
- Dominick Dunne
- Jeanne Eagels
- Perry Ellis
- Geraldine Ferraro
- Marshall Field III
- Malcolm Forbes
- Greta Garbo
- John Garfield
- Judy Garland
- George Gershwin
- Ira Gershwin
- Lillian Gish
- Adam Goldstein
- Albert H. Gordon
- Lesley Gore
- Rocky Graziano
- Rex Harrison
- Rita Hayworth
- William Randolph Hearst, Jr.
- Heavy D
- Leona Helmsley
- Jim Henson
- Philip Seymour Hoffman
- Lena Horne
- Vladimir Horowitz
- Richard Hunt (puppeteer)
- Fannie Hurst
- Richard Isay
- Jacob Javits
- Peter Jennings
- Jiggly Caliente
- Howard Deering Johnson
- Madeline Kahn
- George S. Kaufman
- Kenneth Keating
- Jacqueline Kennedy Onassis
- Robert F. Kennedy
- Dorothy Kilgallen
- Robert Kibbee
- Allyn King
- Georgette Klinger
- Ed Koch
- Florence La Badie
- Andrew A. Lanyi
- Héctor Lavoe
- Mordecai Lawner
- Heath Ledger
- John Lennon
- Henry Cabot Lodge
- Dick Lynch
- Mary MacLeod Trump
- Norman Mailer
- Billy Martin
- Bat Masterson
- Graham McNamee
- Ethel Merman
- Anna Moffo
- Mary Tyler Moore
- The Notorious B.I.G.
- Glenn O'Brien
- Cardinal John O'Connor
- Les Paul
- James Cash Penney
- Peter George Peterson
- Ayn Rand
- Tony Randall
- Charles Revson
- John Ringling
- Joan Rivers
- Tito Rodríguez
- L'Wren Scott
- Bishop Fulton J. Sheen
- Willi Smith
- Jean Stapleton
- Igor Stravinsky
- Ed Sullivan
- Robert A. Taft
- Cecil Taylor
- Nikola Tesla
- John Timoney
- Ernst Toller
- Arturo Toscanini
- Fred Trump
- Ivana Trump
- Rudolph Valentino
- Luther Vandross
- Robert F. Wagner
- Jimmy Walker
- Richard Watts Jr.
- Mae West
- Tennessee Williams
- Frank Woolworth
- Li Yong
