= Quest (cigarette) =

Cigarette brand

Quest was an American brand of cigarettes manufactured by Vector Tobacco and available in the United States from 2002–2010. It was manufactured using genetically altered tobacco plants.

The product was available in three versions. Quest 1, Quest 2, and Quest 3.

Each version of the product contained a different amount of nicotine.

Quest 1 was reported to have of .6 mg of nicotine. Quest 2 was reported to have of .3 mg of nicotine. Quest 3 was reported to have only trace amounts of nicotine (.05 mg).

The manufacturer stressed that Quest cigarettes contained all the unhealthy carcinogens and had the same side effects of a regular cigarette, with the single exception of reduced nicotine levels.
