= Patrick Tighe =

American architect

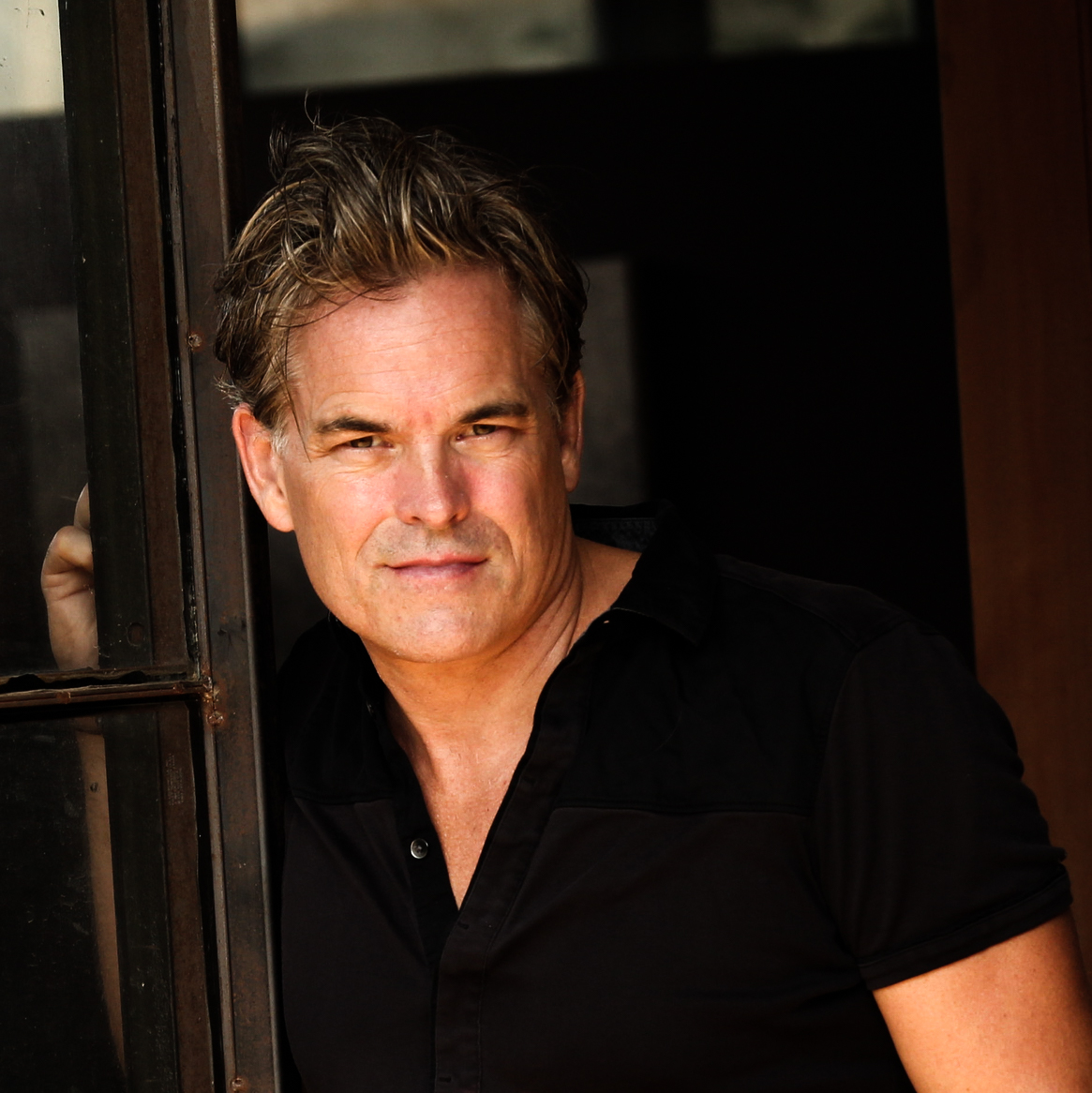
- Education: University of California, Los Angeles; UMass Amherst
- Occupation: Architect
- Awards: Rome Prize; Interior Design Hall of Fame; AIA Young Architect Award; FAIA; MacDowell Colony Fellowship
- Practice: Patrick Tighe Architecture
- Buildings: 8500 Melrose; 2510 Temple; Hollywood Hills House; La Brea Affordable Housing; Montee Karp Residence; Sierra Bonita Affordable Housing
- Website: www.tighearchitecture.com

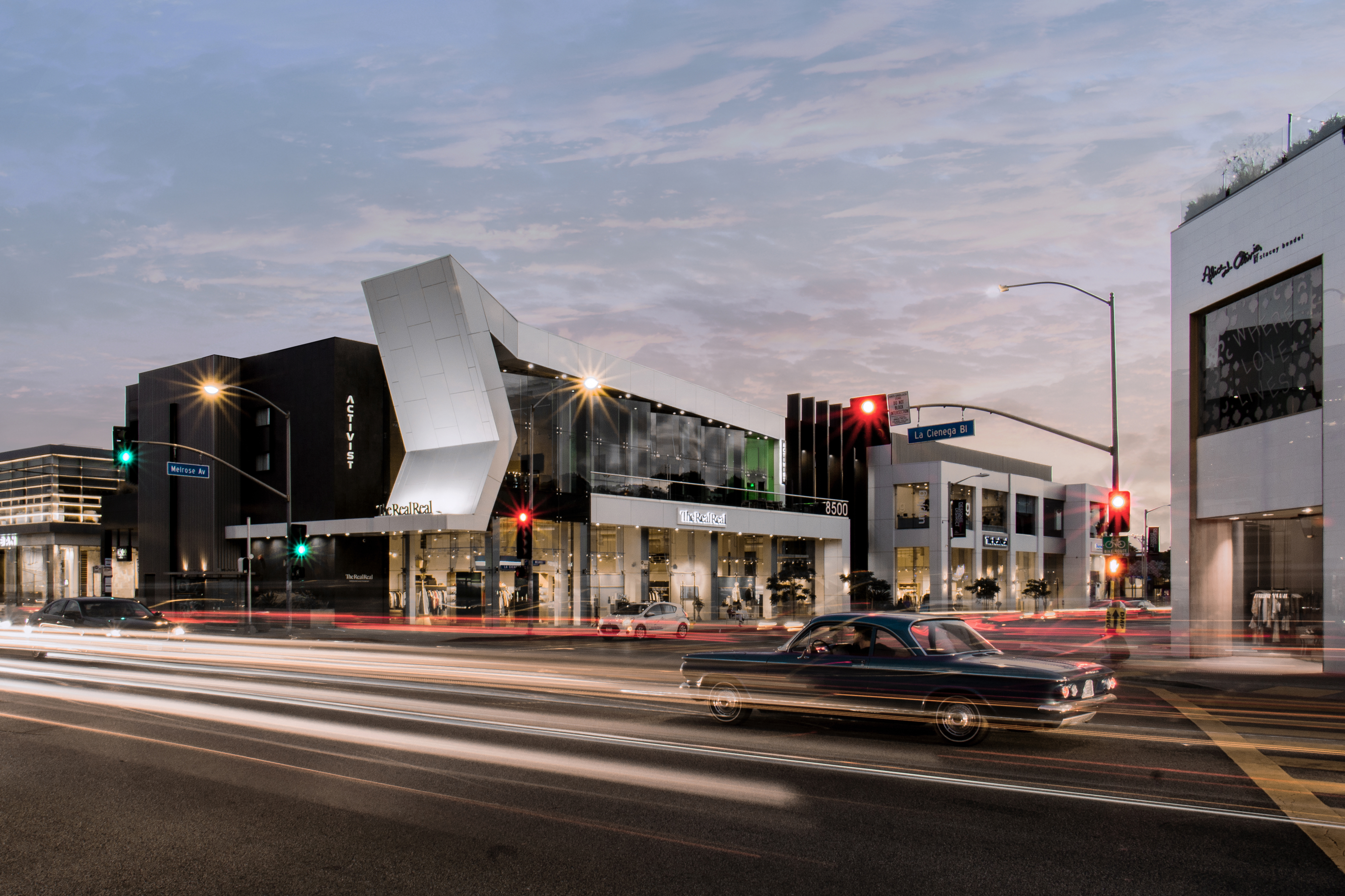
8500 Melrose, Los Angeles, CA

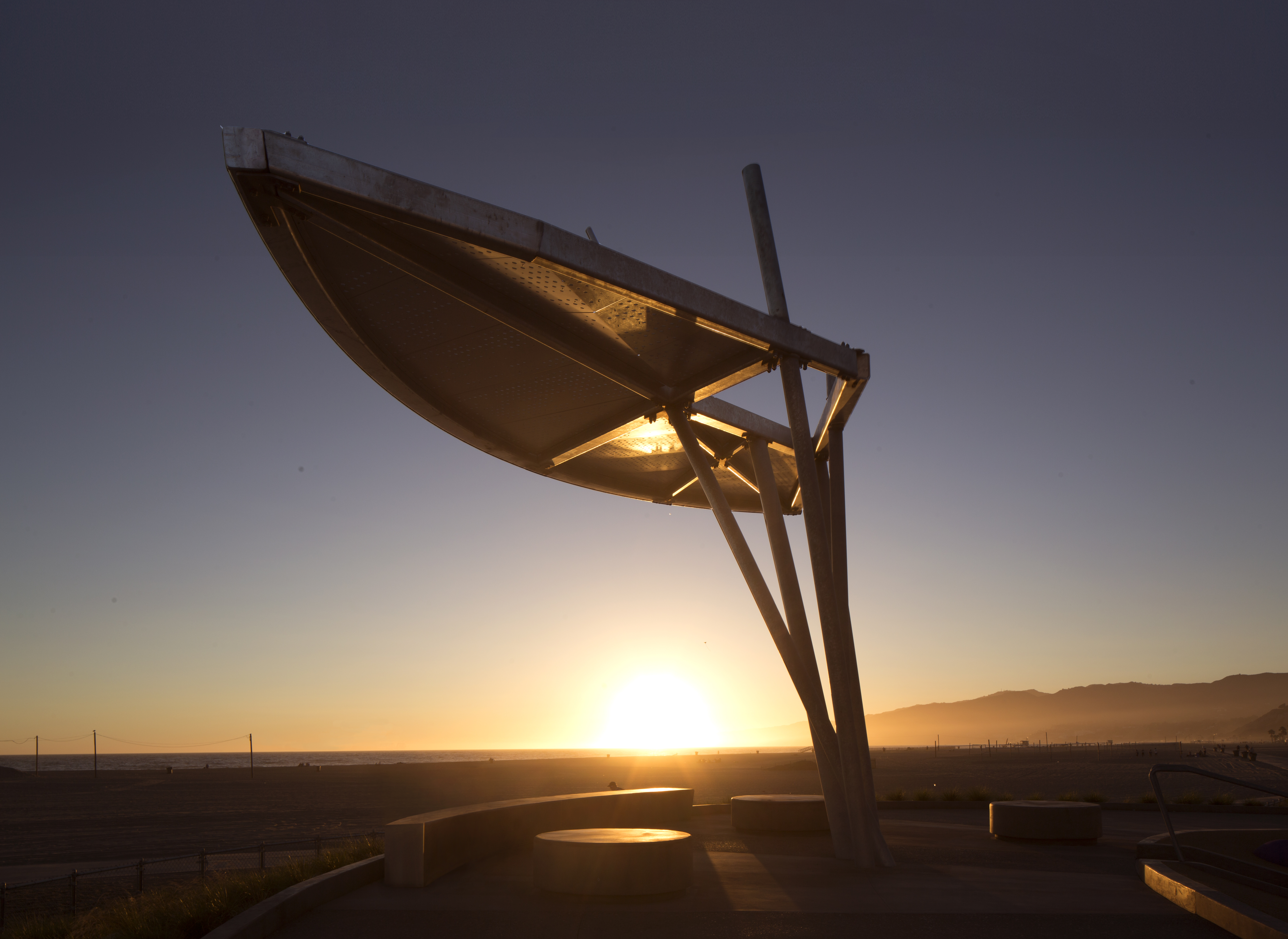
North Beach Park, Santa Monica, CA

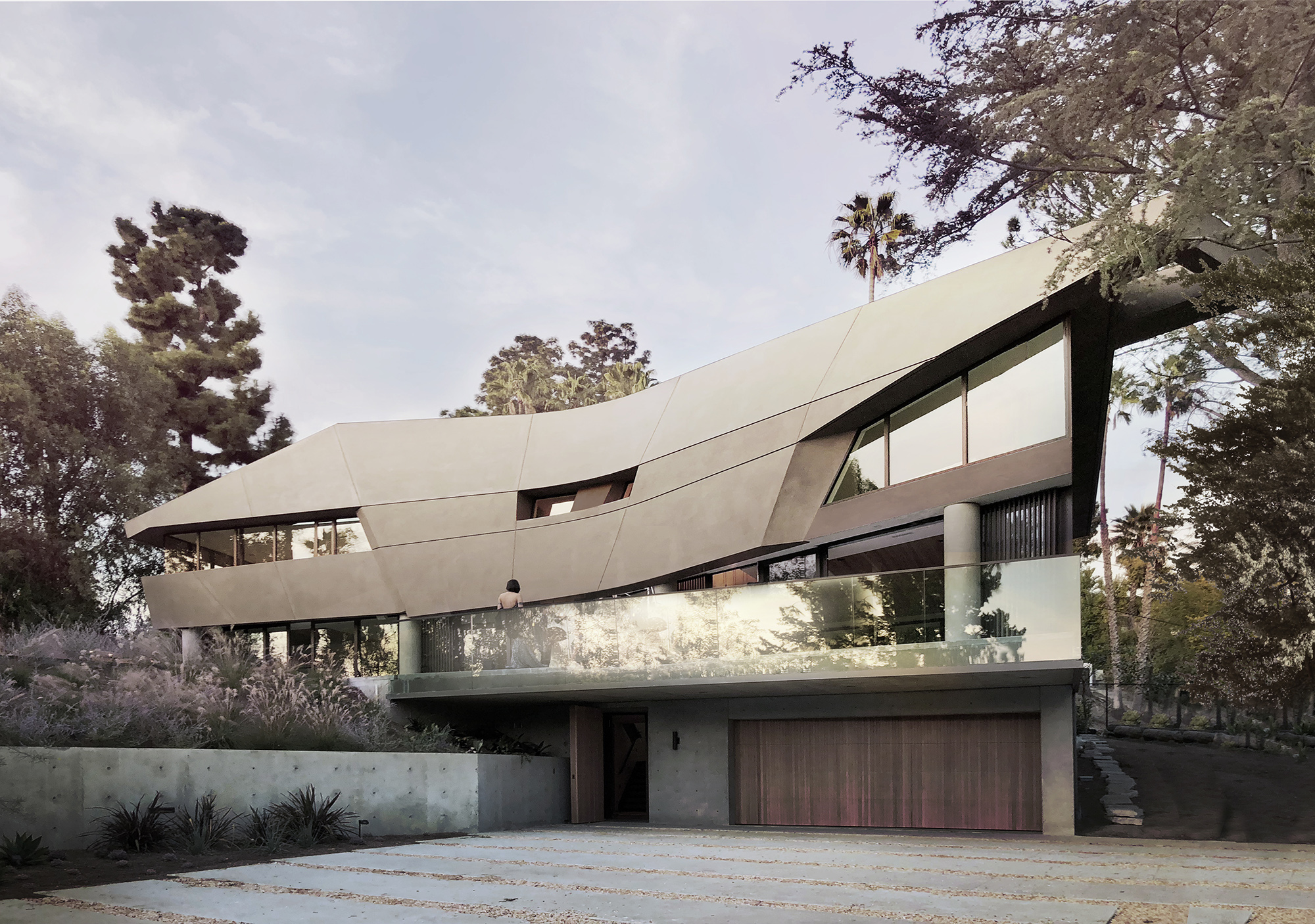
Hollywood Hills House, Los Angeles, CA

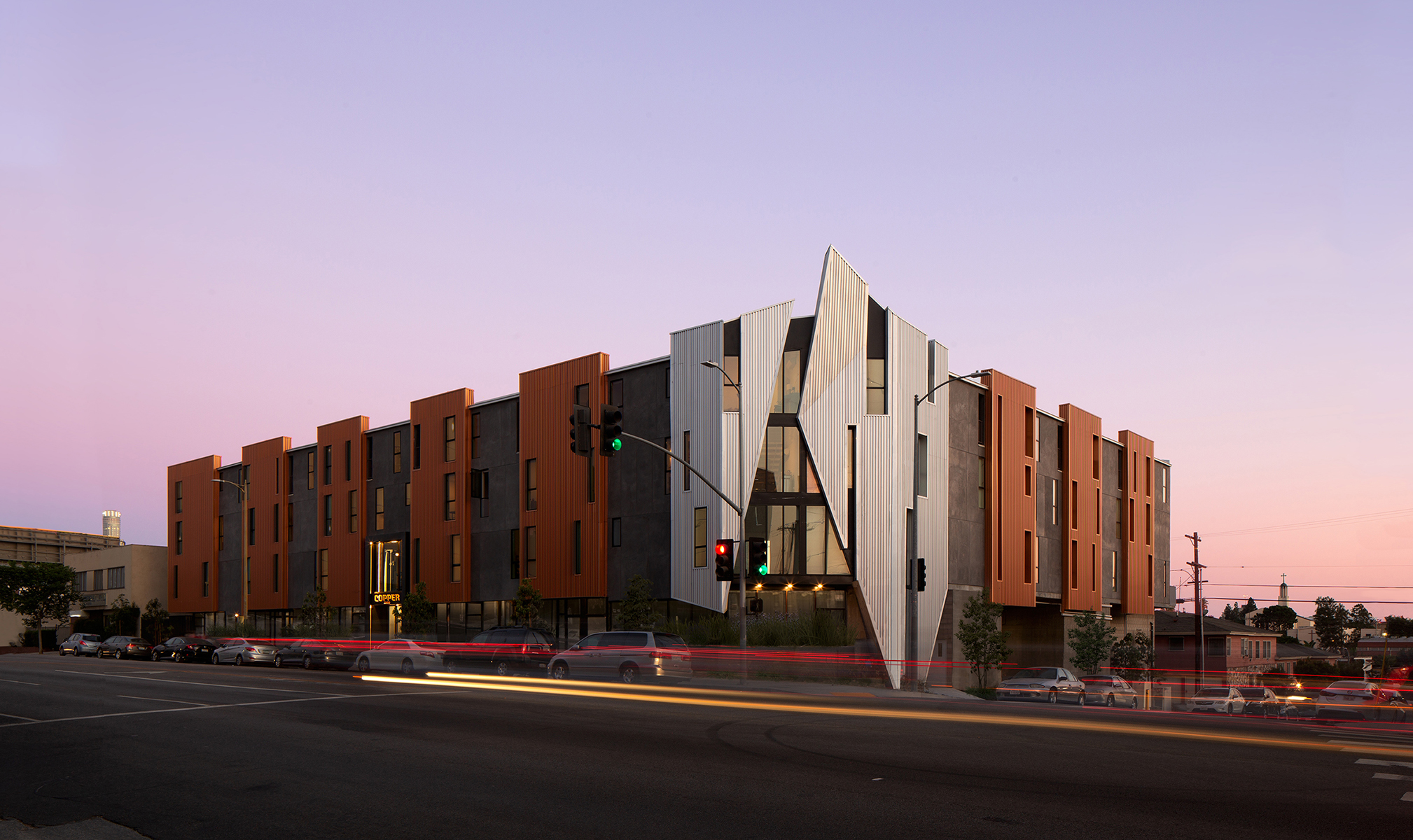
2300 Beverly, Los Angeles, CA

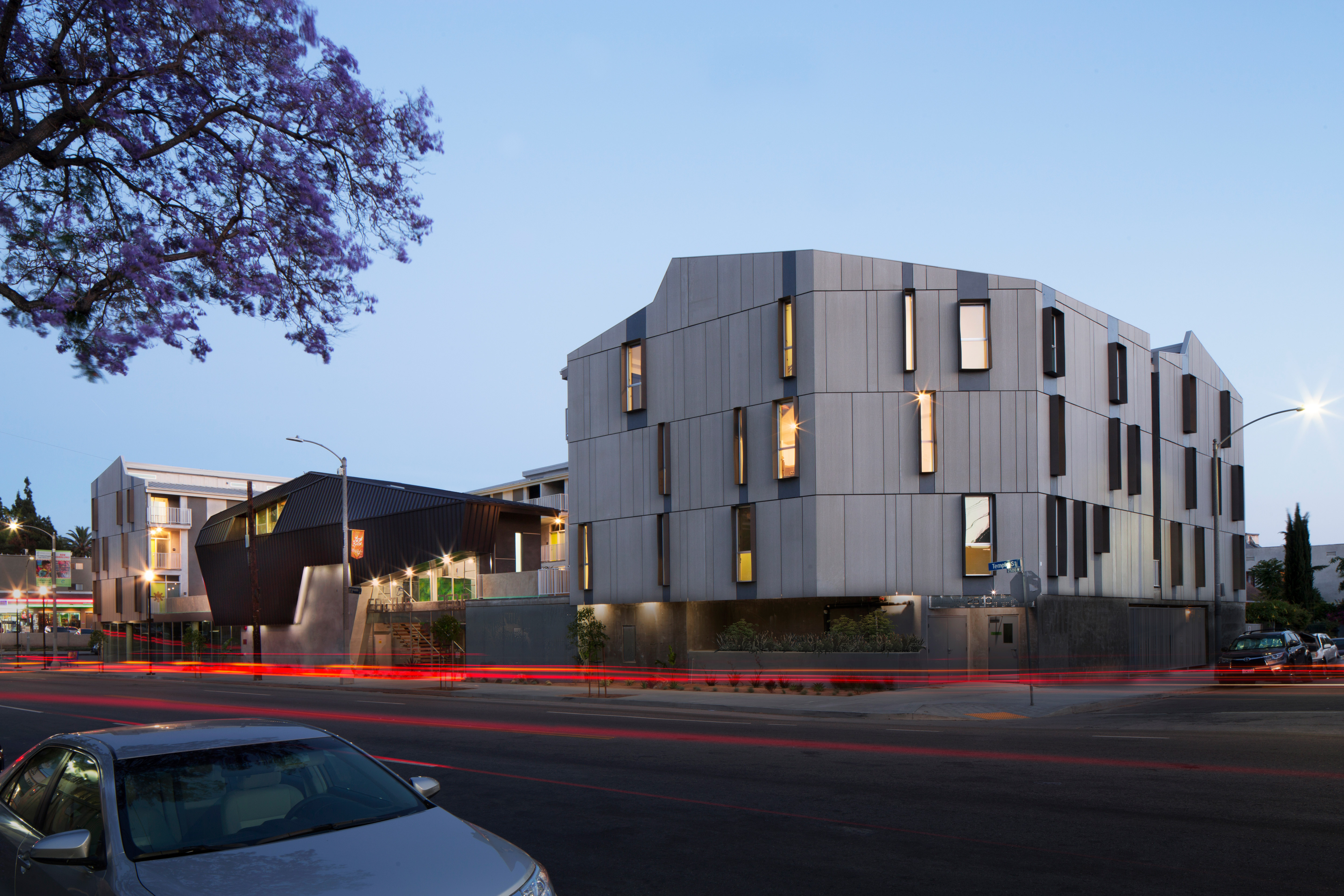
2510 Temple, Los Angeles, CA

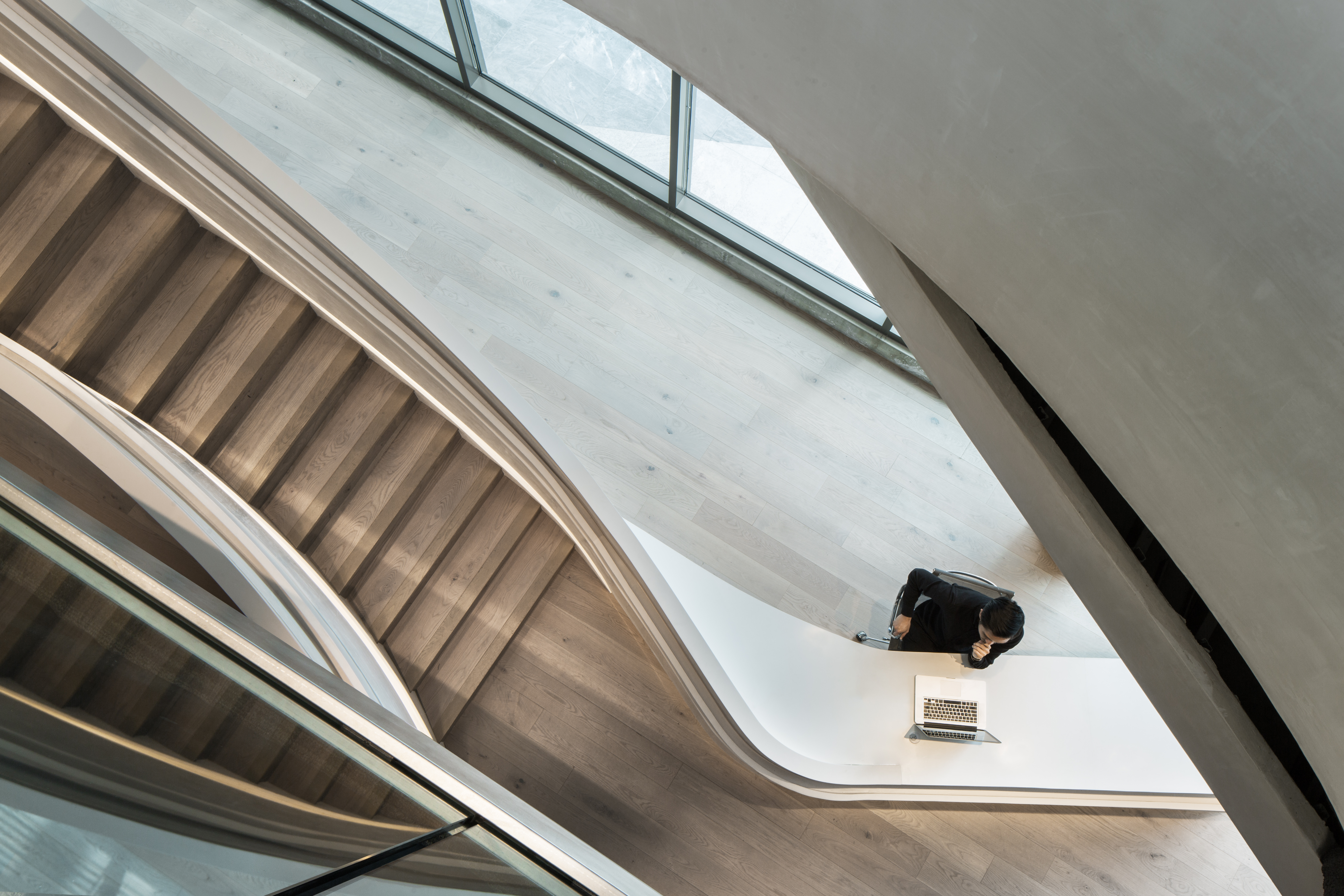
Douglas Elliman California Headquarters, Beverly Hills, CA

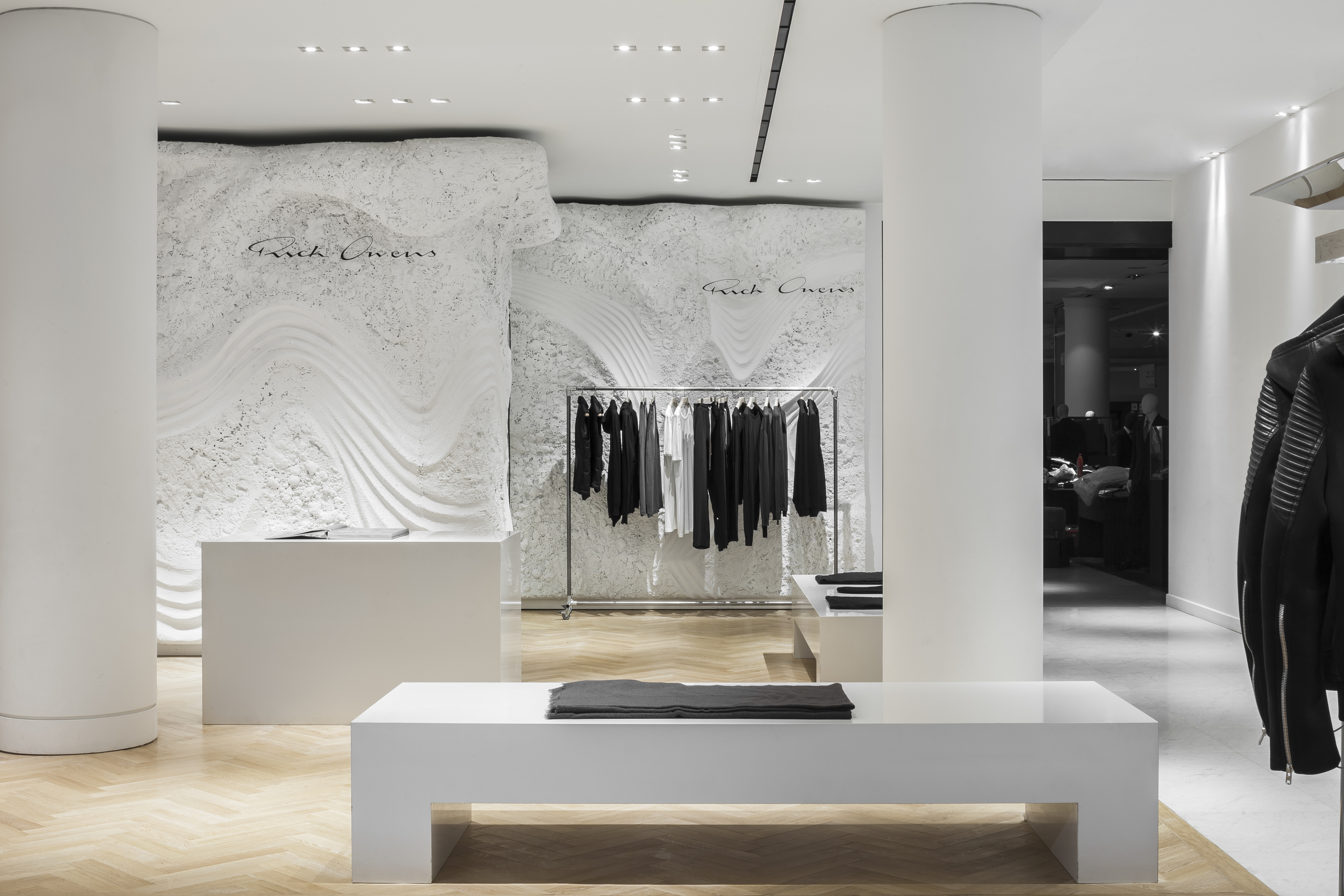
Rick Owens, Selfridges Department Store, London, UK

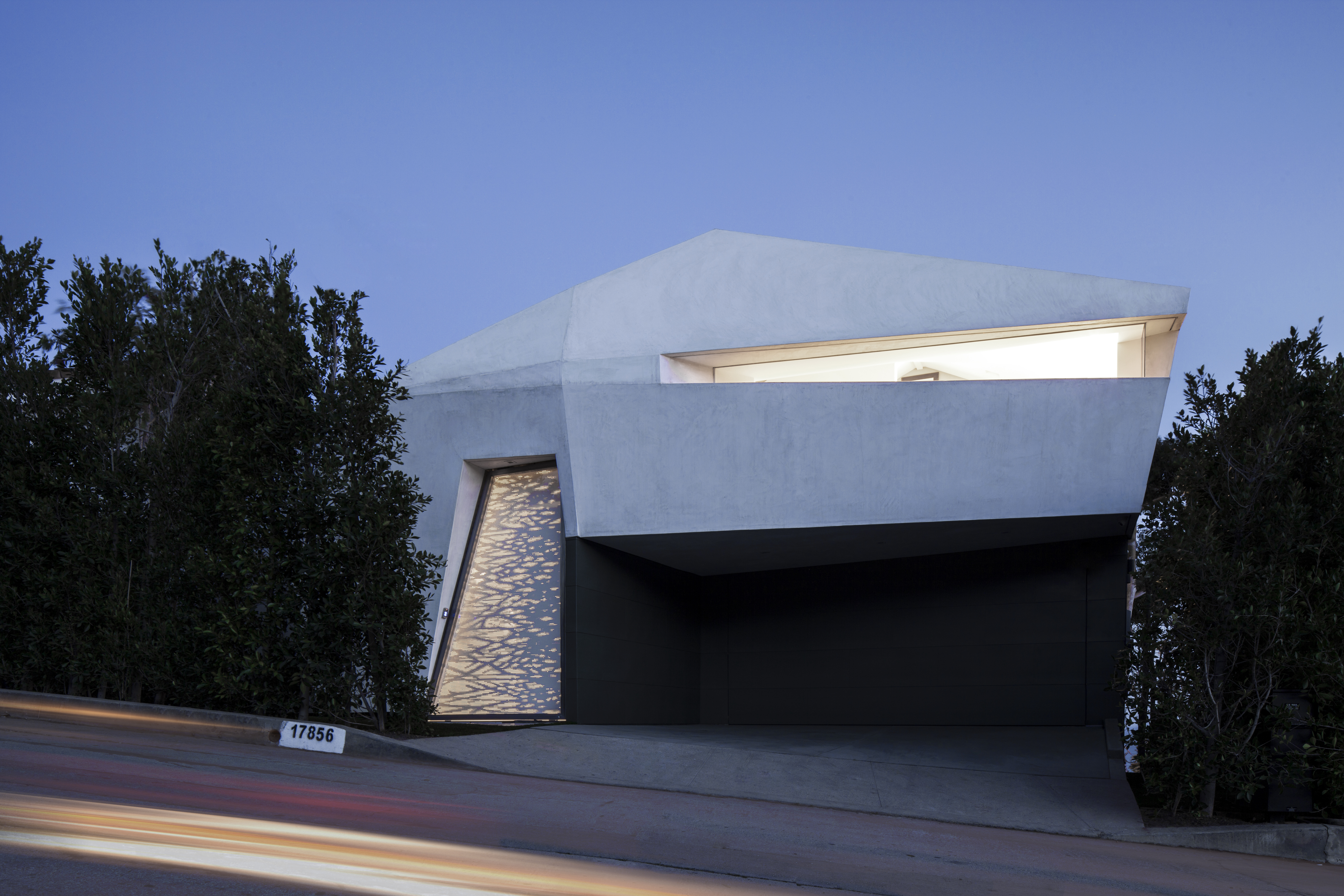
Montee Karp Residence, Pacific Palisades, CA

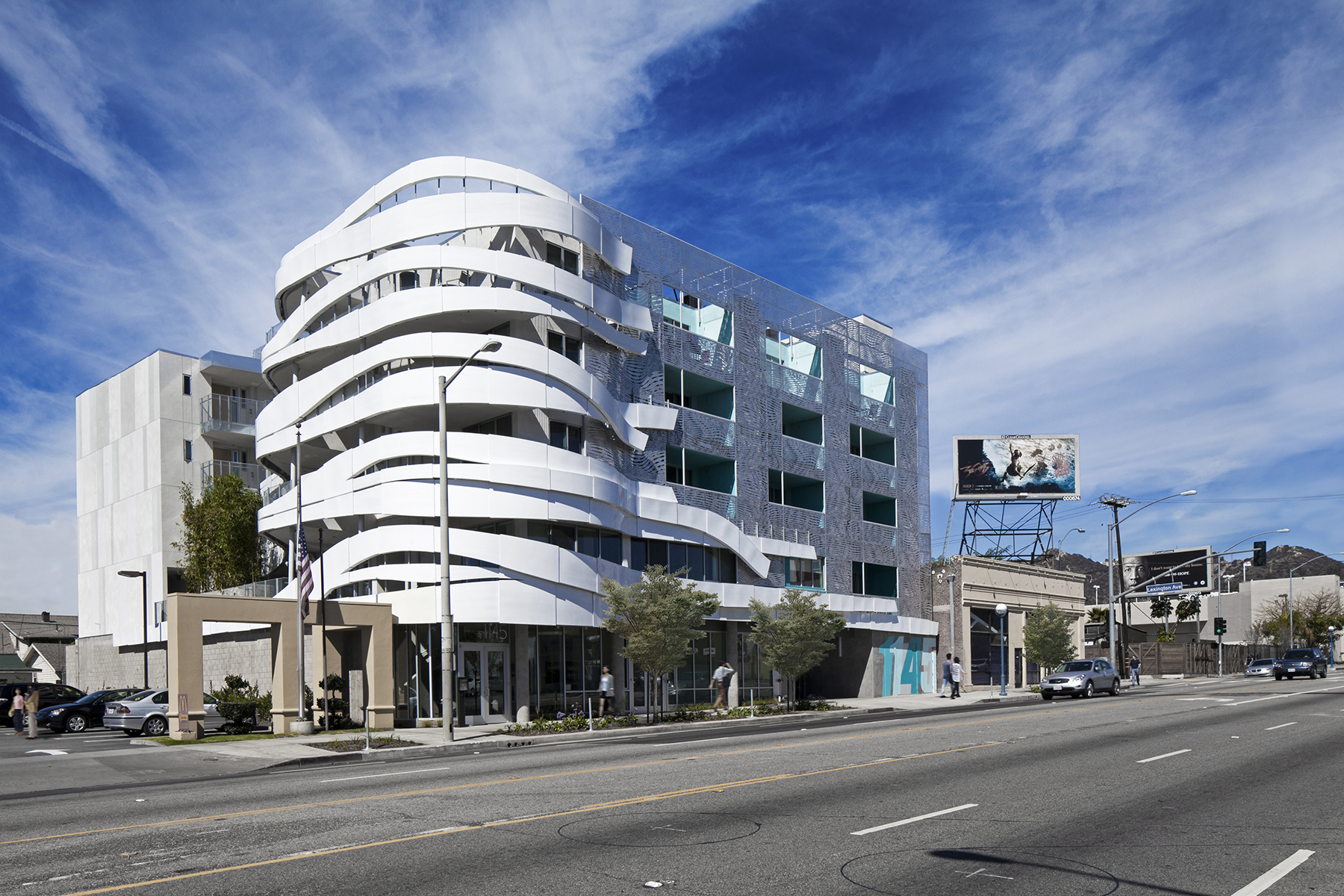
La Brea Affordable Housing, West Hollywood, CA

Sierra Bonita Housing, West Hollywood, CA

Moving Picture Company, Santa Monica, CA

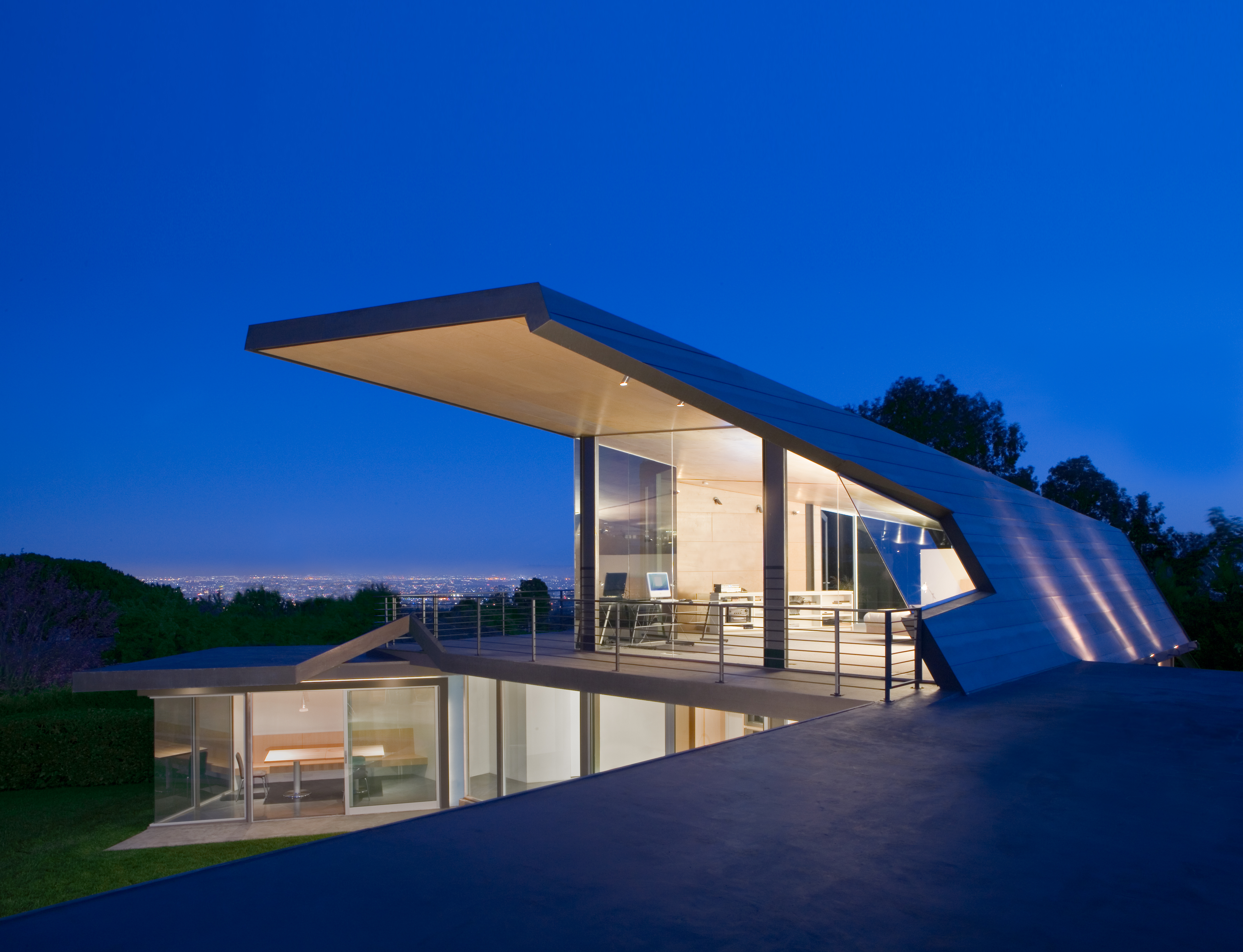
Tigertail, Los Angeles, CA

Patrick Tighe, FAIA, FAAR is an American architect and interior designer based in Los Angeles, California. He is the founder and principal of Tighe Architecture. Tighe was born in Lowell, Massachusetts. He received a Master of Architecture with Distinction from UCLA. Tighe worked for Frank O. Gehry & Associates, and was an associate of Thom Mayne’s Morphosis Architects for 7 years before leaving to found Tighe Architecture.

Patrick Tighe was awarded the prestigious Mercedes T. Bass Rome Prize in Architecture, the American Institute of Architects' Young Architect Award. Tighe is a Fellow of the American Academy and The MacDowell Colony. Tighe was elected to the College of Fellows of the American Institute of Architects for "notable contributions to the advancement of the profession of architecture.” In 2019, Tighe was inducted into the Interior Design Magazine Hall of Fame. Tighe is currently an adjunct professor at the University of Southern California and has previously held teaching positions at UCLA and the Southern California Institute of Architecture.

Tighe has produced work that has been published in over 20 countries and recognized internationally, including The New York Times, Architectural Digest, Architect Magazine, Interior Design, Newsweek, Wallpaper, Metropolis, Architectural Record, and many other publications.

The firm has received the profession's highest honors and has exhibited Internationally including the 2013 Museum of Contemporary Art, Los Angeles' "A New Sculpturalism: Contemporary Architecture from Southern California". The work of the firm has been shown at the Venice Biennale and solo shows include “Dopplegangers” at the A+D Museum, Los Angeles and “Out of Memory”, an immersive sound installation consisting of a parabolic spray foam structure milled on site using robots. The project was realized in conjunction with composer Ken Ueno for the SCI Arc Gallery in Los Angeles and was recognized with a National Honor Award from the American Institute of Architects.

In 2016, Tighe authored “Building Dichotomy”, published by Images, a monograph of the firm's work.

== Significant Projects ==
Project	Location	Year	Distinctions
8500 Melrose	West Hollywood, California	2018	LA Architectural Award
North Beach Park	Santa Monica, California	2018	American Architecture Award Westside Prize Calibre Award APWA BEST Award
Hollywood Hills House	Los Angeles, California	2018	American Architecture Award
2300 Beverly	Los Angeles, California	2018	NA
2510 Temple	Los Angeles, California	2017	American Architecture Award Architect's Newspaper Best of Design Award AIA LA Design Award AIA LA Residential Award
Douglas Elliman, California Headquarters	Beverly Hills, California	2016	Calibre Award LA Architectural Award
Rick Owens	Selfridges, London, UK	2015	Interior Design Best of Year Award
Montee Karp Residence	Pacific Palisades, California	2015	AIA LA Design Award Architect's Newspaper Best of Design Award California Home+Design Award Interior Design Best of Year Award World Architecture Festival (Shortlist)
La Brea Housing	West Hollywood, California	2014	AIA Residential Award Azure Magazine Top 10 of 2014
Sierra Bonita Housing	West Hollywood, California	2012	NAHRO Award for Excellence in Project Design AIA/HUD Secretary's Award Westside Prize LA Architectural Award
Moving Picture Company	Santa Monica, California	2009	AIA Honor Award
Tigertail	Los Angeles, California	2008	AIA LA Design Award
