= Douglas Elliman =

American real estate brokerage company

- Type: Public
- Traded as: NYSE: DOUG
- Industry: Real estate
- Founded: 1911; 115 years ago
- Founder: Douglas L. Elliman
- Key people: Michael Liebowitz (CEO)
- Parent: Montauk Battery Realty
- Website: www.elliman.com

Douglas Elliman is an American real estate company.

Douglas Elliman employs more than 7,000 agents and has 113 offices in New York City and across the country. The company also has a number of subsidiaries related to real estate services such as Douglas Elliman Development Marketing, Douglas Elliman Property Management, DE Commercial and DE Title. The current chairman and CEO is Michael Liebowitz.

== History and overview ==
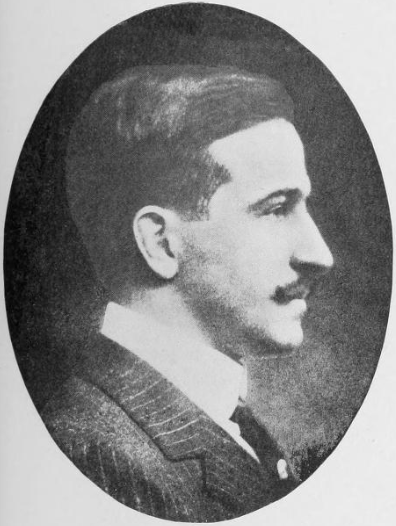
Douglas L. Elliman (1882–1972)

The company was founded by Douglas L. Elliman in 1911, as a basement store at 421 Madison Avenue in Manhattan. He served as its first president, and remained its honorary chairman until his death in 1972.

The company was sold to the Milstein family (Seymour Milstein and Paul Milstein) in 1989 and then again to Insignia Financial Group (now CB Richard Ellis) in 1999.

In 2003, Insignia sold Douglas Elliman to Montauk Battery Realty, an affiliate of Vector Group's New Valley LLC subsidiary.

In 2012, the company dropped "Prudential" from its name, returning to its original 1911 name. It has a partnership with London-based Knight Frank LLP for residential business. Douglas Elliman affiliates include DE Property Management, DE Title and DE Capital Mortgage.

In December 2021 Douglas Elliman was spun off from Vector Group.

In October 2026, a Black couple, looking to move from Delaware to New York, sued Douglas Elliman for alleged racial discrimination after one of their real estate agents mistexted to the couple "Ugh. They are black…". The agent was later fired.

== Regional branches ==
- Douglas Elliman New York covers the New York Metropolitan area, with 22 offices in New York City, 26 offices on Long Island, and six offices in Westchester (headquarters at 101 King Street, Chappaqua) and Connecticut (headquarters at 88 Field Point Road in Greenwich, Connecticut). The company produces research on the New York City real estate market that is used to measure real estate activity by media and other organizations. It is a member of the Real Estate Board of New York (REBNY). A reality television series titled Selling the City which follows a group of agents from this branch premiered in 2025 on Netflix.
- Douglas Elliman Florida has its headquarters at 1111 Lincoln Road in South Beach, Miami, one of five South Beach offices, with 14 other offices across the state. In September 2013, Douglas Elliman named Jay Phillip Parker, a Florida attorney and real estate entrepreneur, as CEO of the Florida brokerage.
- Douglas Elliman California opened its Beverly Hills headquarters in 2015, in a building designed by Patrick Tighe. In 2017, Douglas Elliman acquired Teles Properties, a Southern California competitor, becoming the second-largest non-franchise residential brokerage in California based on sales volume, after Pacific Union. In 2016 Elliman and Teles had a combined sales volume of around $4 billion in California and $27.4 billion nationwide, according to Douglas Elliman. Following the acquisition, the Teles name was dropped.
- Douglas Elliman Hamptons has headquarters at 2488 Main Street in Bridgehampton, one of nine East End offices.

== Notable brokers ==
- Tal and Oren Alexander
- Josh Altman
- Penny Crone
- Raphael De Niro
- Fredrik Eklund
- Luis D. Ortiz
- Tracy Tutor
- Kendra Wilkinson

== Philanthropy ==
Douglas Elliman's philanthropic donations include the American Heart Association, Central Park Conservancy, the Gold Coast Film Festival, and Big Brothers Big Sisters of New York City. In 2013, the company donated $100,000 to the Southampton Hospital Foundation.
