= Eve (cigarette) =

American brand of cigarettes

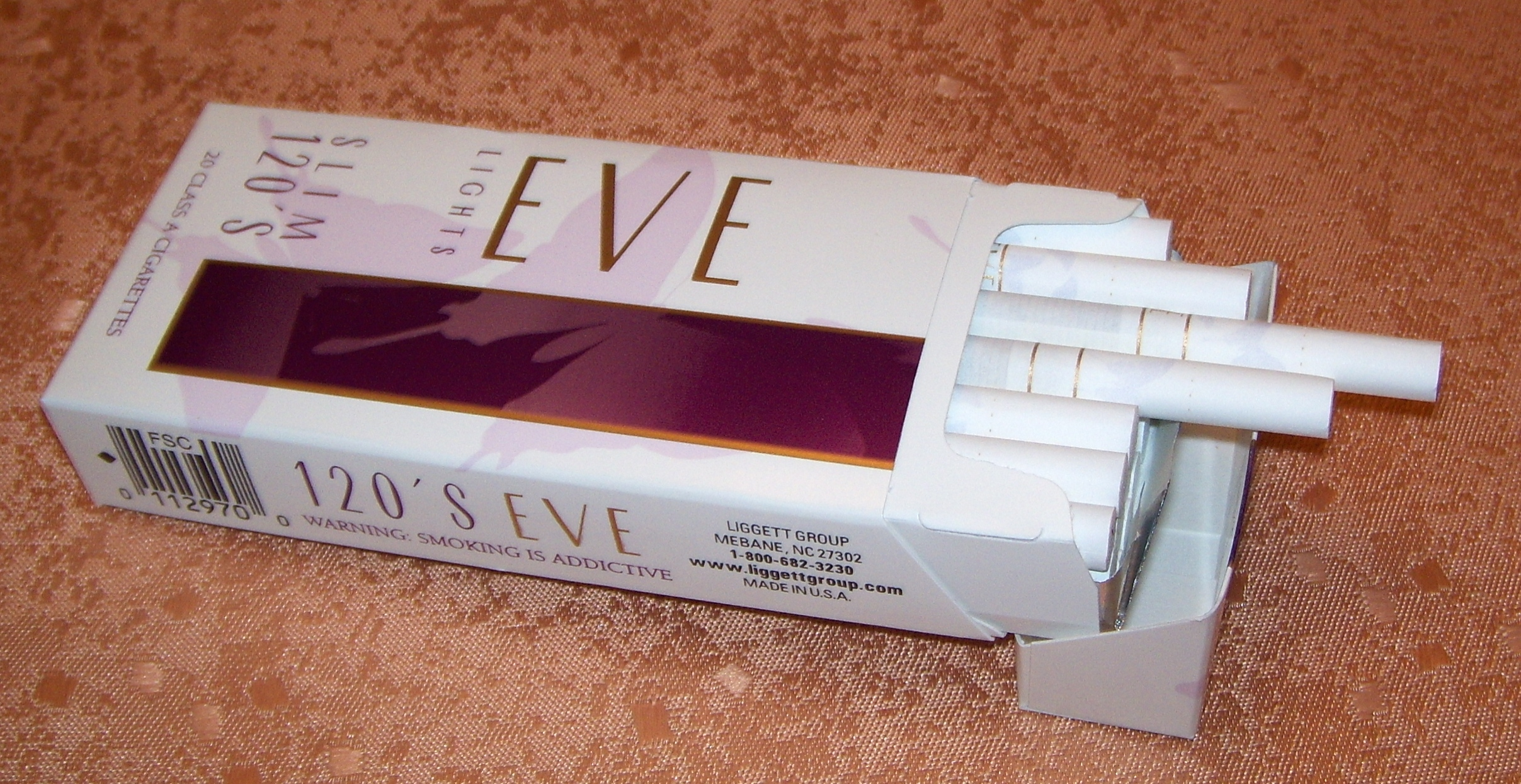
- A 5th generation pack of American Eve Light cigarettes. Note the text warning on the side.
- Product type: Cigarette
- Current owner: Liggett Group (United States); Philip Morris International (Germany); PMFTC, Inc. (Philippines)
- Produced by: Liggett Group (United States); Philip Morris International (Germany); PMFTC, Inc. (Philippines)
- Country: United States
- Introduced: 1971; 55 years ago
- Markets: See Markets
- Tagline: "Farewell to the ugly cigarette pack", "Finally a cigarette as pretty as you", "Every inch a lady"

Eve is an American brand of cigarettes currently owned and manufactured by the Liggett Group in the United States. Outside of the U.S., Philip Morris International is the manufacturer of the brand.

== History ==
Eve was launched in 1971 to compete with Philip Morris Corporation's Virginia Slims cigarette as a more conventionally feminine brand of cigarette designed to target the growing women's market. Eve cigarettes were particularly marketed towards black women.

In the 20th century, both the packaging and the cigarettes featured a floral design, with advertisements describing the cigarette as having "flowers on the outside, flavor on the inside." As of 2002, the floral pattern has been replaced by butterflies.

== Marketing ==
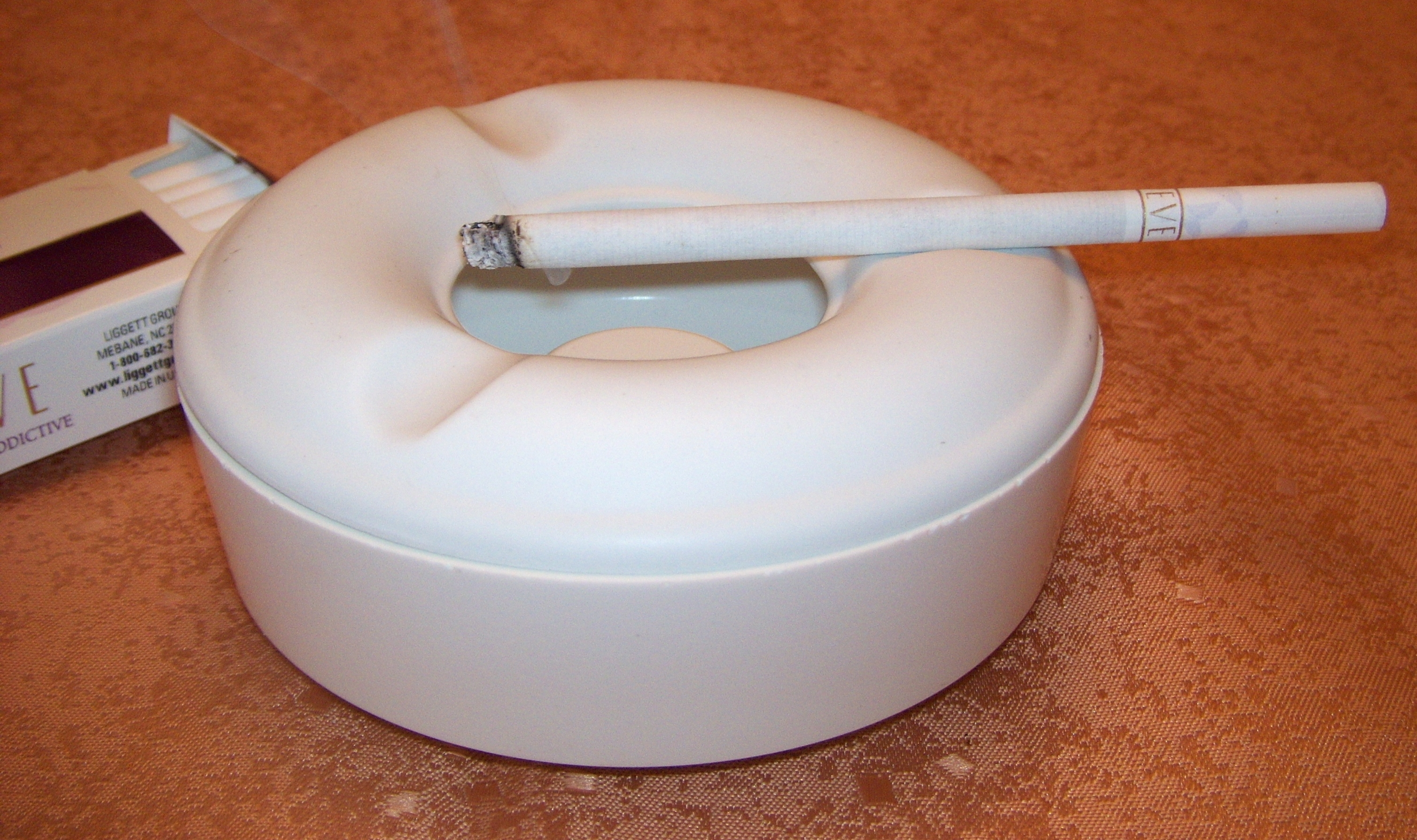
Lit Eve Light 120, with watermark butterflies above the Eve logo

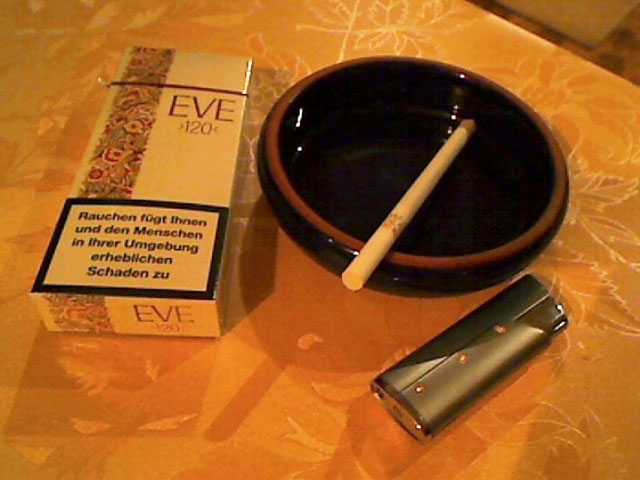
Pack of German Eve 120s, with the new health warning label mandated by the European Union

The cigarette brand employed advertising campaigns urging women to embrace their femininity. Drawing inspiration from Virginia Slims, Eve sought to attract female consumers by positioning cigarettes as fashionable accessories. Numerous print advertisements depicted women in elegant attire, a notably more conservative image compared to their Virginia Slims counterparts, which was associated with the women's movement. Some of their slogans directly addressed physical appearance, such as the 1970s campaign titled "Farewell to the Ugly Cigarette Pack."

Eve cigarettes distinguished themselves by being longer and narrower than the average cigarette, aligning with the prevailing notion that slim and slender figures are considered desirable in women’s fashion and modelling industries. This characteristic aimed to align Eve with the subliminal message, akin to Virginia Slims, that their brand could contribute to obtaining or maintaining a slim figure. The brand also emphasized its extra length, typically 120mm compared to the 85mm of an average cigarette, using slogans like "Every inch a lady" in the 1980s to underscore the association between long cigarettes and sophistication promoted during that era.

Eve's advertising strategy centered on portraying their cigarettes as objects of beauty, aiming to enhance the attractiveness of women who chose to smoke Eve. The primary objective was to gain market share from competing brands, especially those targeting women, and to attract non-smokers by suggesting that choosing Eve would make a woman more attractive.

In comparison to its main competitor, Virginia Slims, Eve targeted a more niche market; as a result, Eve did not achieve the same level of sales as Virginia Slims.

== Markets ==
Eve is mainly sold in the United States, is still sold in Germany as of August 2026, and was or still is sold in The Philippines, Austria, Ceuta, Melilla, Italy, Hungary, Russia, Israel, and Argentina.

== Packaging ==
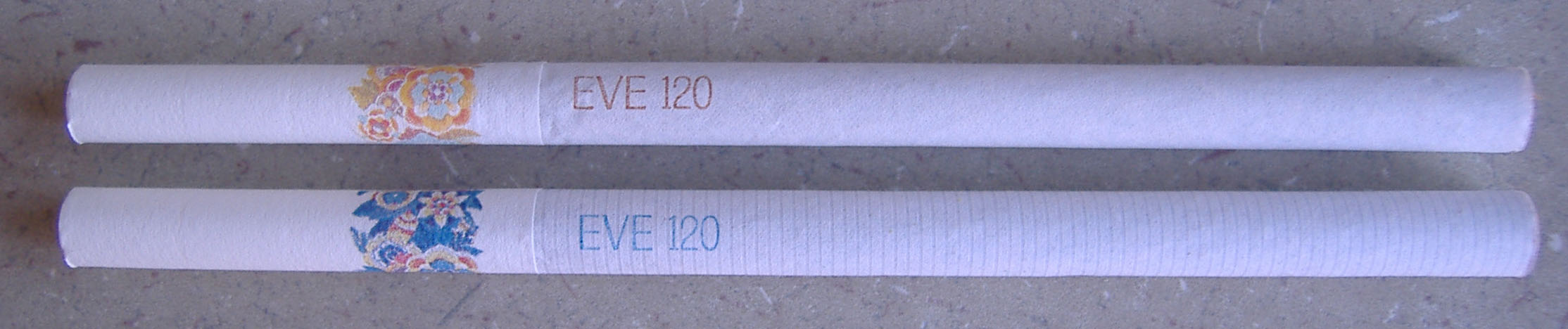
Unlit Eve and Eve Blue cigarettes, German made

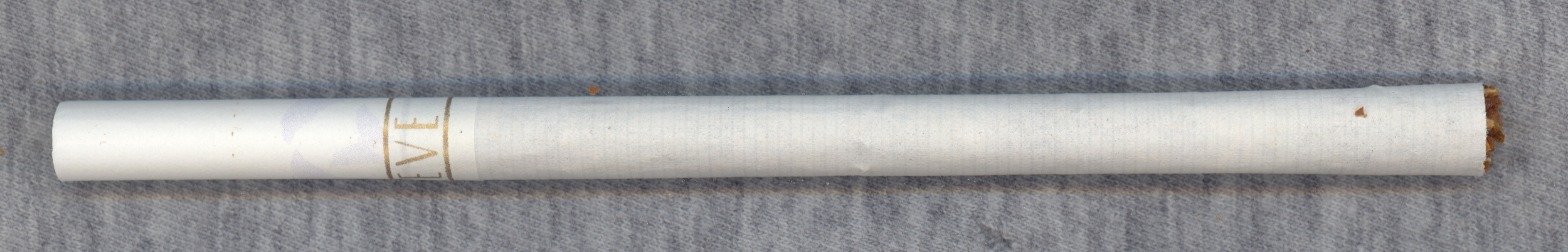
Unlit Eve Light 120 cigarette, American made (ultra light and menthol styles similar)

Eve's packaging was created by Lubalin, Smith, & Carnase, and originally featured an art nouveau design that covered both the box and the cigarettes. Its original design was a soft pack decorated with flowers and drawing of Eve in the garden. It later removed the female figure and retained only the flowers, before the flowers were minimized to a band lengthwise on a white cardboard box.

This packaging went unchanged until 1992, when the small multicolored flowers were replaced by thin orchid-like flowers in jewel tones on the box, and a single small colored flower on the filter band of the cigarette. In Germany, the packaging and cigarette design did not change, retaining the floral band. Menthol versions of Eve used similar designs but with more greenish tones.

Shorter 100mm Eve in Regular and Menthol boxes were eventually reintroduced in 1985 but gradually disappeared due to a lack of consumer interest.

In 1990, Eve Ultra Lights 120s were introduced in Regular and Menthol, promising lowered tar and nicotine, and milder flavor. The packaging consisted of a white flip-top box, with long-stemmed flowers done in pastels, and a single pastel flower on the filter band. Menthols were similar but were greener.

After 1992, packaging remained unchanged until 2002, when the flowers were replaced by butterflies (gen. 5). Ultra Lights lost the long-stemmed flowers they had since their introduction and were unified with the regulars for the first time by assuming the butterfly motif, with different colors identifying Ultra Lights (blue) and Menthol Ultra Lights (teal), to complement the colors identifying Lights (purple) and Menthol Lights (green).

In 2002, soft pack 100s were reintroduced using the butterfly design of the 120s. As in the mid-1980s, the 100s were gradually phased out.

By July 2010, as per the Family Smoking Prevention and Tobacco Control Act, the words "lights" and "ultralights" were removed.

As of 2023, four styles of Eve cigarettes are available: Eve Amethyst 120s, Eve Sapphire 120s, Eve Menthol Emerald 120s, and Eve Menthol Turquoise 120s. The butterfly band around the filter and above the rings with the Eve logo now appears as a subtle watermark, as opposed to the bright colors featured in the past.

== See also ==
- Smoking culture
- Tobacco smoking
