= Liggett Group =

Tobacco company

JTI LIGGETT
- Type: Subsidiary
- Industry: Tobacco
- Predecessors: Liggett & Myers Tobacco Company
- Founded: 1873; 153 years ago
- Headquarters: Raleigh, North Carolina, United States
- Area served: United States
- Key people: Christopher Foulks, Founder
- Products: Tobacco
- Brands: LD; Montego; Liggett Select; Eve; Grand Prix; Jade; Pyramid; Eagle 20’s USA
- Parent: Japan Tobacco International
- Website: www.liggettgroup.com

JTI LIGGETT (/ˈlɪɡɪt/ LIG-it), formerly known Liggett Group and Liggett & Myers Tobacco Company, is the fourth largest tobacco company in the United States. It is the leader in the super value category of cigarette products and owns two of the top ten cigarette brands in the United States. It also markets Logic e-cigarettes. Its headquarters are located in Raleigh, North Carolina, though its major manufacturing facilities are in Mebane, North Carolina, and in Danville, Virginia. The company is a subsidiary of Japan Tobacco International.

== History ==
John Edmund Liggett's grandfather, Christopher Foulks, was the owner of a snuff mill in New Egypt, New Jersey. During the War of 1812 the mill was razed by British soldiers. Foulks moved west around 1820 and opened a new snuff shop in Belleville, Illinois, in 1822. In 1833 he moved his tobacco business to St. Louis, Missouri, where in 1844–1847 (dates uncertain) John Edmund Liggett entered his grandfather's business.

By 1858, Foulks's company was known as J. E. Liggett and Brother. Around 1869 the company created the first blended cigarettes, using a mixture of Turkish and Virginia tobaccos. A partnership was formed with George Smith Myers of Missouri, and in 1873 The Liggett & Myers Tobacco Company was incorporated.

In 1876, Liggett & Myers introduced L&M plug chewing tobacco, during the 1880s it entered the cigarette business and by 1885 the company had become the world's largest manufacturer of plug chewing tobacco.

John E. Liggett died in 1897 and two years later Liggett & Myers was acquired by American Tobacco Company, controlled by James Buchanan Duke. George S. Myers died in 1910 and the following year the U.S. Court of Appeals issued a Dissolution Decree to the American Tobacco Company which created the opportunity for Liggett & Myers Tobacco Company to be reborn. It was headquartered in St Louis again.

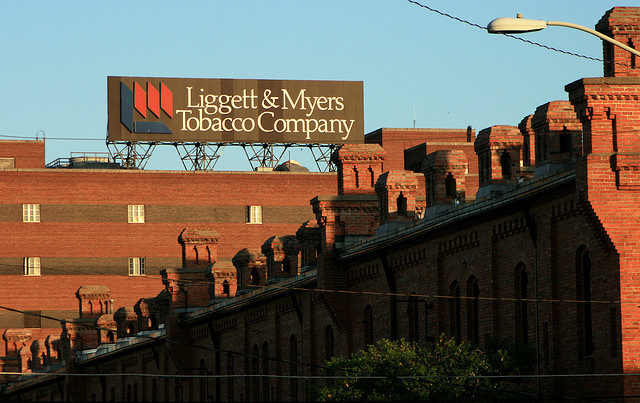
Liggett & Myers Factory In Durham, NC

Liggett & Myers continued to release new brands. In 1912, Chesterfield was reintroduced as a Turkish-Virginia blended cigarette and in 1915 Burley and Maryland tobaccos were added to Chesterfield blend. It was in 1916 that Chesterfield became the first cigarette to add a moisture-proof, overall cover to the paper and foil pack. In 1917, the company built a warehouse and factory at Huntington, West Virginia. It was listed on the National Register of Historic Places in 1998.

By 1921, cigarettes had become the most used form of tobacco. Continuing to innovate, in 1952, Liggett & Myers using Chesterfield became the first to offer cigarettes in two sizes: King and Regular.

In 1953, L&M filter cigarettes were introduced.

In 1963, Lark charcoal filter cigarettes were introduced. In 1968 the company changed its name to Liggett & Myers, Incorporated.

In 1970, the Eve brand was launched in regular and menthol.

The company again changed its name in 1976 to Liggett Group, Inc., with Liggett & Myers Tobacco Company as a division.

In 1980, Eve 120's were launched nationally and the same year Liggett was acquired by Grand Metropolitan PLC. In 1981 Liggett introduces generic cigarette concept. Another name change took place in 1983, this time the head company becoming GrandMet USA with the tobacco company officially named Liggett Group Inc.

In 1983, smoker Rose Cipollone filed a lawsuit against the Liggett Group and two other tobacco companies that produced the cigarettes she smoked. Cipollone died of lung cancer in 1984, but the trial continued. The Liggett Group was charged $400,000 in damages in a 1988 court decision, but in 1992 the decision was reversed on appeal to the U.S. Supreme Court in the case Cipollone v. Liggett Group, Inc.

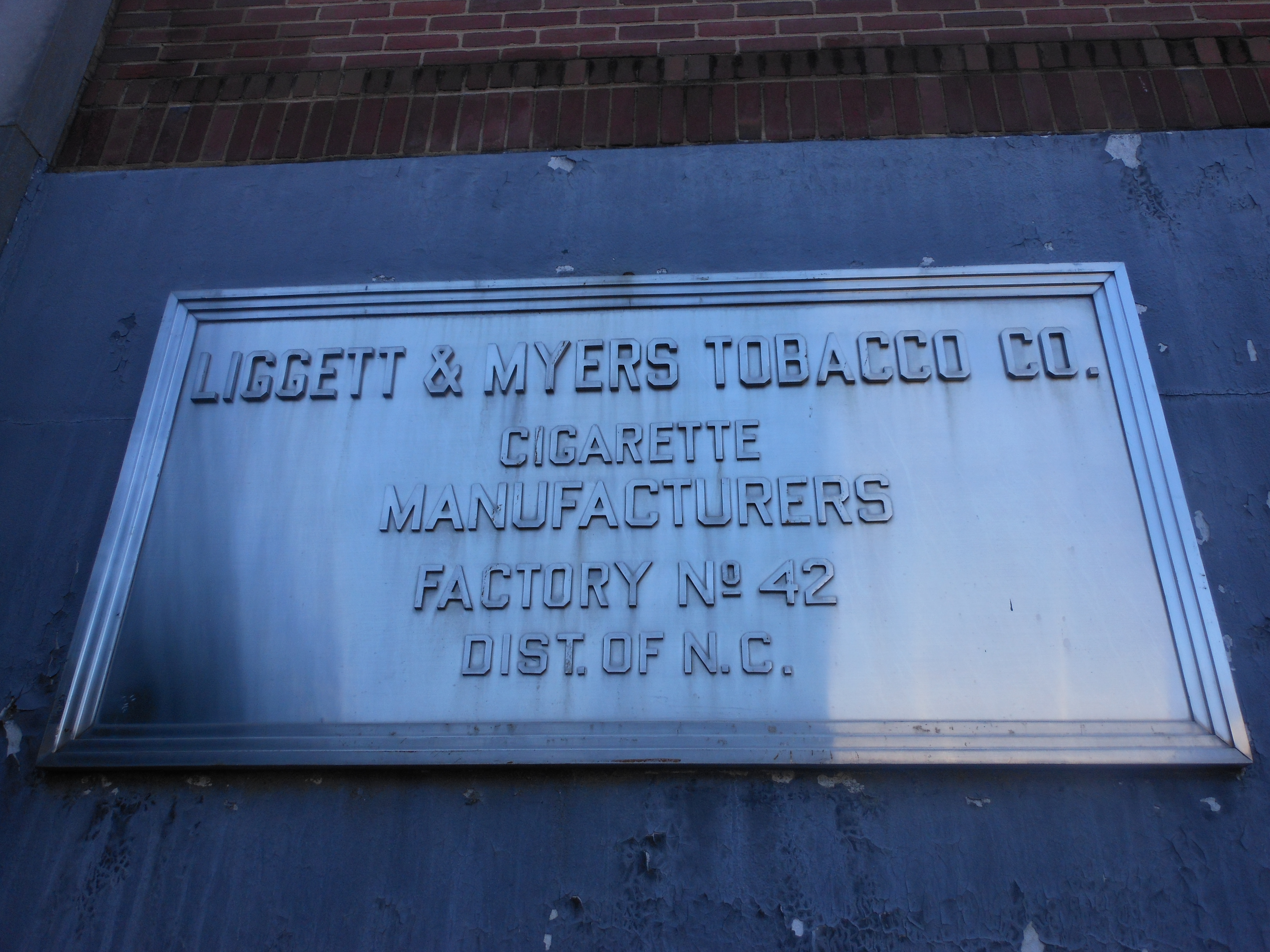
Liggett & Myers factory sign in Durham, NC

In 1986, Bennett S. LeBow purchased Liggett from Grand Metropolitan. In 1987, Liggett's stock was offered publicly on the New York Stock Exchange. In 1988, Liggett introduced Pyramid cigarettes. In 1990 Liggett became a subsidiary of Brooke Group Ltd., a holding company owned by Mr. LeBow. In 1990, The Wall Street Journal acclaimed Pyramid as "one of the most successful cigarette introductions of the decade". In 1992, Eve and Lark were relaunched with new packaging and backed by large advertising and promotional campaigns. In 1993, Liggett developed its Control Label concept, offering customers exclusivity to market Control Brands owned by Liggett. By 1994 Liggett had expanded its Control Label family to a total of eight brands.

In 1995–1996, the company attempted unsuccessfully to take over the much larger R.J. Reynolds Tobacco Company.

In 1996–1997, Liggett Group had become the first tobacco company to settle smoking-related litigation brought by the attorneys general of several states. In 1998, Liggett signed the tobacco litigation Master Settlement Agreement, and 1999 saw the formation of Vector Tobacco Inc.

In 1999, Liggett Vector Brands Inc. sold L&M, Lark and Chesterfield brands to Philip Morris Companies Inc., now known as the Altria Group.

In 2025, Liggett Vector Brands Inc. was purchased by Japan Tobacco International.

== See also ==
- List of tobacco-related topics
- Cigarette § United States
