= History of Drexel University =

University chronology

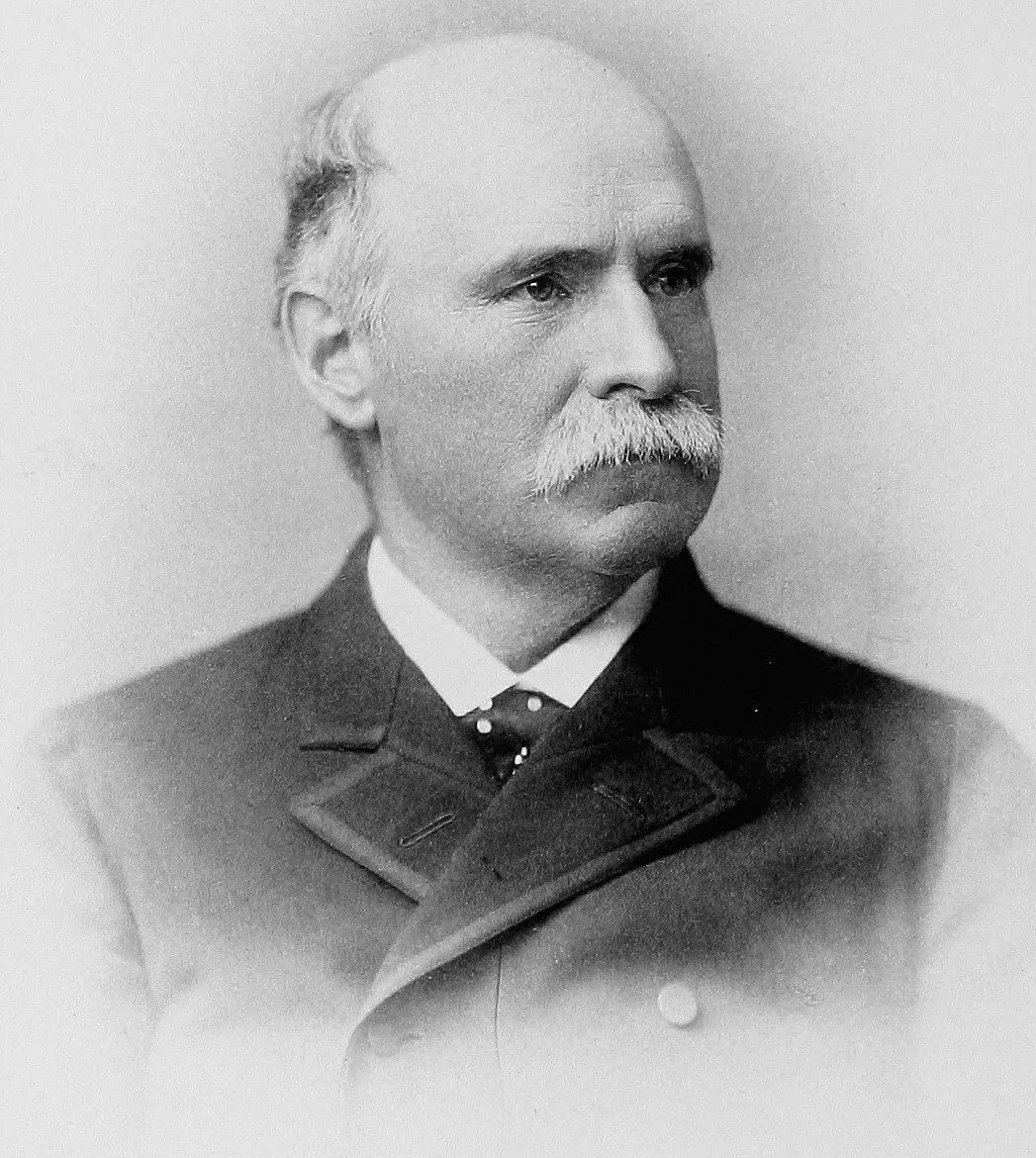
Anthony Joseph Drexel, who founded the Drexel Institute of Art, Science and Industry in 1891, which later became Drexel University

The history of Drexel University, a private university in Philadelphia, began with the founding of Drexel Institute of Art, Science and Industry in 1891 by Anthony J. Drexel, with the main building dedicated on December 17 of that year.

During the term of the Institute's first president, James A. MacAlister, from 1891 to 1913, the institute offered courses in various subjects such as art and illustration, mechanical arts, domestic arts and sciences, commerce and finance, teacher training, physical education, and librarianship. From 1895 to 1898, renowned American Impressionist painter Colin Campbell Cooper taught watercolor and architectural rendering courses. Though Drexel did not initially grant degrees, it began conferring the Bachelor of Science degree in 1914.

During the administration of Drexel University presidents W. W. Hagerty, after whom the University City campus Library is named, and James Creese, Drexel underwent a period of rapid expansion, constructing new classroom buildings or dormitories each year. During this time, President Hagerty led the transformation of what had previously been a technological college primarily focused on undergraduate teaching to a comprehensive university in 1970. Also, in 1970, the Drexel Institute of Technology became Drexel University.

After Hagerty's departure, admissions, enrollment, and the university's financial situation went into substantial decline. The majority of problems occurred during and after the recession of the early 1990s. Drexel struggled to remain solvent and began to use endowment funds to pay operating expenses. There was even discussion of the school being absorbed into the nearby University of Pennsylvania.

In 1997, with the renovation of Van Rensselaer Hall, Drexel University began a period of expansion led by president Constantine Papadakis to enlarge the university, its student population, and its alumni funding base. Master plans for further construction projects, which would involve significant changes to the campus and buildings over at least five years, were announced on October 16, 2006.

In April 2009, Celestino Pennoni became the interim president while Papadakis took medical leave; Papadakis died on April 5. In August 2010, John Fry took over as president. In 2011, Drexel acquired the Academy of Natural Sciences of Philadelphia.

== History ==
=== 19th century ===
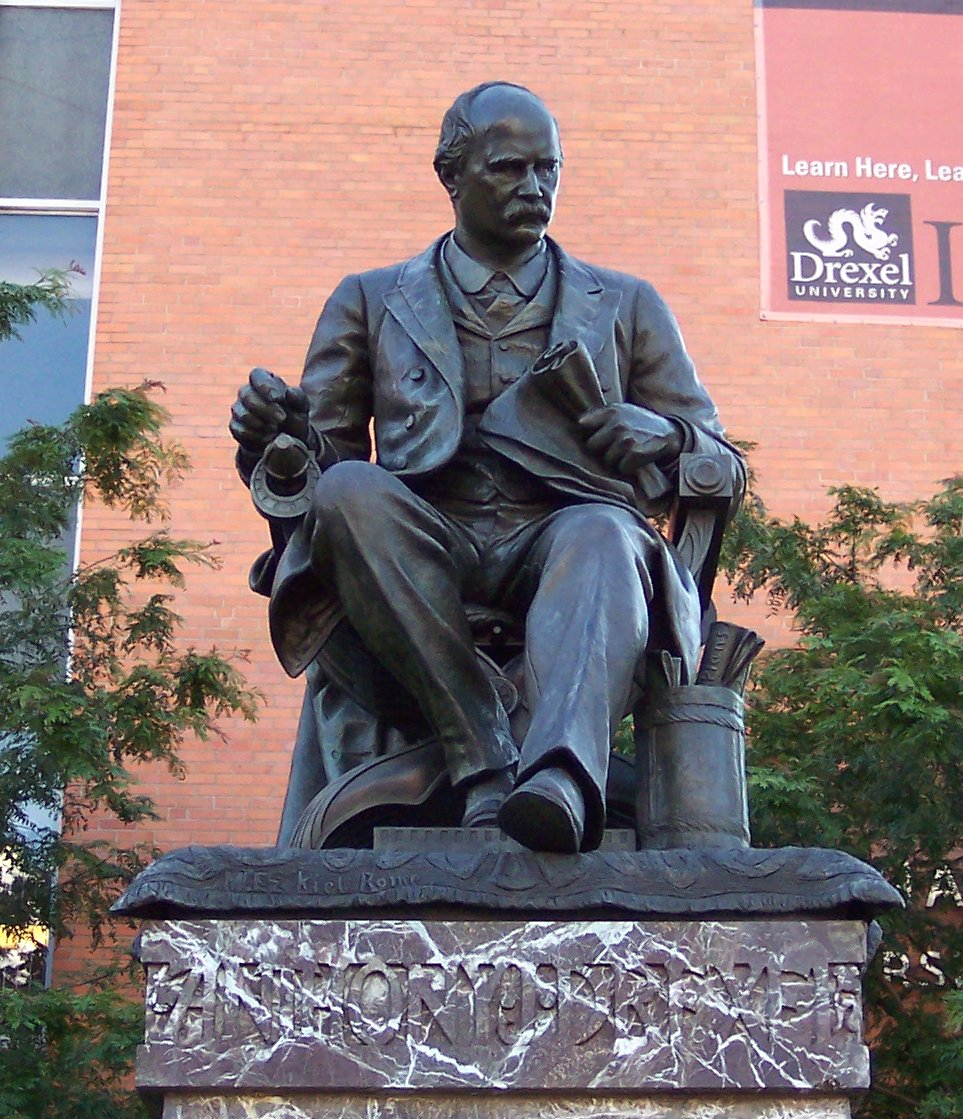
A 1904 statue of Anthony Joseph Drexel by Moses J. Ezekiel, which was moved to the Drexel University campus in Philadelphia in 1966

Drexel Institute of Art, Science and Industry was founded in 1891, by Anthony J. Drexel, with the main building dedicated on December 17 of that year. The convocation was attended by such figures as Andrew Carnegie and Thomas Edison, as well as the governor of Pennsylvania and the vice president of the United States, Levi Morton. Bishop Henry Potter officiated the convocation, and Chauncey Depew gave an address praising the new institution for its goal of preparing students for jobs in science and industry, as opposed to training lawyers and academics in abstract fields.

The Institute's first president was James A. MacAlister. Born in Glasgow, Scotland, in 1840, MacAlister emigrated with his family to Wisconsin in 1850, attended Brown University, and subsequently received his J.D. from Albany Law School in 1864. During his term as president (1891–1913), the institute offered a variety of courses in subjects ranging from art and illustration, mechanic arts, domestic arts and sciences, commerce and finance, teacher training, physical education, and librarianship. He also advocated lectures and programs that were open to the public, even granting access to the library to non-students. Another initiative was to offer classes in the evening that could be attended by working professionals.

From 1895 to 1898, renowned American Impressionist painter Colin Campbell Cooper taught courses in watercolor and architectural rendering. In 1905, the department of art was closed (except for the architecture program). In the same time period, the school expanded the main building eastward into additional buildings on Chestnut and 32nd streets. The school also grew from 70 graduates in 1891 to 500 in 1913.

=== 20th century ===
Though Drexel did not originally grant degrees, it began granting the Bachelor of Science degree in 1914. In 1919, Drexel introduced its cooperative education program (wherein students alternate studying with full-time professional employment). In 1927, the Commonwealth of Pennsylvania gave Drexel the privilege to grant the Master of Science degree.

Drexel became the Drexel Institute of Technology in 1936.

During the administration of Drexel University presidents W. W. Hagerty, after whom the University City campus Library is named, and James Creese, Drexel underwent a period of rapid expansion, constructing new classroom buildings or dormitories each year. The buildings constructed include the Kelly, Myers, Calhoun, and Towers dormitories, as well as most of the buildings surrounding the Quad, including Matheson, Korman, Disque, and Nesbitt. During this time, President Hagerty led the transformation of what had previously been a technological college primarily focused on undergraduate teaching to a comprehensive university in 1970.

Also in 1970, the Drexel Institute of Technology became Drexel University.

In 1983, Drexel became the first university in the United States to require all its undergraduates to be able to access microcomputers for use in their coursework.

After Hagerty's departure, admissions, enrollment, and the university's financial situation went into substantial decline. His successor, William S. Gaither, resigned due to pressure from the campus community in 1987 after allegations of sexual misconduct with staff members arose. The majority of problems occurred during and after the recession of the early 90s. Drexel was struggling to remain solvent and began to use endowment funds to pay operating expenses. Gaither's successor, President Breslin, was not able to react to difficulties coming from lower admissions. There was even discussion of the school's being absorbed into the next-door University of Pennsylvania until the selection of president Constantine Papadakis.

In 1997, with the renovation of Van Rensselaer Hall, Drexel University began a period of expansion led by president Constantine Papadakis to enlarge the university, its student population, and its alumni funding base. Since 1997, Drexel has completed four new dormitories with plans for at least one more, expanded the research infrastructure with the construction of the Bossone Research Center, renovated various campus buildings and the main quad, and acquired the Queen Lane campus and Hahnemann University Hospital from MCP Hahnemann University. Papadakis also added a School of Law and secured millions of dollars' worth of alumni grants, including several grants of more than $10 million. From 1996 to 2005 total revenue increased +331% to $612M, research funds increased +535% to $83M, the endowment increased +471% to $540M, and total enrollment increased +102% to 18,466. During this time, undergraduate tuition increased +68% to $23,250/year.

=== 21st century ===
Master plans for further construction projects were announced on October 16, 2006, during Drexel University's Founders Day and Convocation Celebration. The plan involves significant changes to the campus and buildings over at least a five-year period. According to President Papadakis, the changes are estimated at around $350 million dollars.

Some of the anticipated changes included:

- Addition of a new biomedical center
- Addition of a skyscraper
- Construct a new building to replace Stratton Hall (Papadakis Integrated Science Building). -- Recently completed
- Construct a new building to replace Matheson Hall. -- (Gerri C. LeBow Hall). -- Recently completed
- Construct a new residence hall (Millennium Hall).
- New Recreation Center and landscaping behind the Daskalakis Athletic Center.
- Northside Dining Center addition to Kelly Hall. -- Completed
- An addition of a west wing to the Rush building.
- An addition of a new wing to the Academic building.
- Refurbishing of the old Armory building into a basketball arena. -- Abandoned project
- Demolition of Myers Hall and the closing of Race Street between 33rd and 34th Streets for more green space.

In 2000, Drexel became the first university to operate a fully wireless campus. In 2006, Drexel opened a new law school.

In April 2009, Celestino Pennoni was named as interim president and chief executive officer of Drexel University while Papadakis took medical leave. On April 5, 2009, President Papadakis died, which placed Drexel University in an interregnum period. In August 2010, John Fry took over as president.

In 2011, Drexel established an affiliation with the Academy of Natural Sciences of Philadelphia, whereby the latter became a subsidiary of Drexel and was renamed to the Academy of Natural Sciences of Drexel University.
