= John Anderson Fry =

American academic administrator

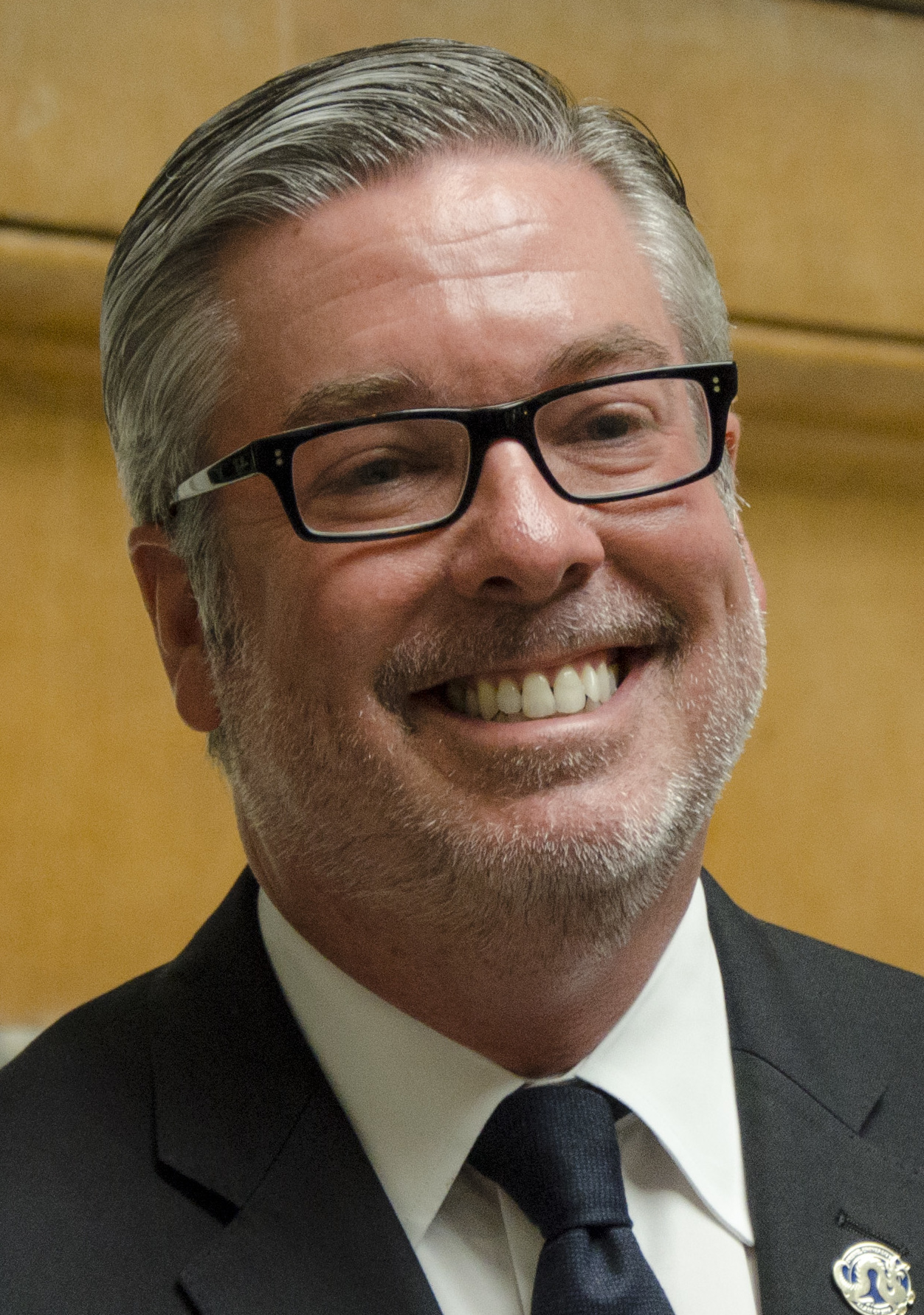

15th President of Temple University
- Incumbent
- Assumed office November 2024
- Preceded by: Richard M. Englert (interim)

14th President of Drexel University
- In office August 2010 – July 2024
- Preceded by: Celestino Pennoni (interim); Constantine Papadakis
- Succeeded by: Denis O'Brien (interim); Antonio Merlo

14th President of Franklin & Marshall College
- In office July 1, 2002 – July 1, 2010
- Preceded by: Richard Kneedler
- Succeeded by: John Burness (interim)

Personal details
- Born: May 28, 1960 (age 66) New York City, U.S.
- Education: Lafayette College (BA); New York University (MBA)

John Anderson Fry (born May 28, 1960) is an American academic administrator, currently serving as the president of Temple University. Fry formerly served as president of Drexel University, as well as Franklin & Marshall College. In 2024, he was elected to the American Philosophical Society.

== Early life and education ==
John Anderson Fry was born in Brooklyn, New York City, on May 28, 1960, and received an undergraduate degree in American Civilization from Lafayette College. He worked in accounting, during which time he received an MBA degree from the New York University Stern School of Business. He eventually worked in management consulting, specializing in universities.

== Career ==
=== University of Pennsylvania ===
One of Fry's consulting clients was the University of Pennsylvania. Penn president Judith Rodin hired him as executive vice president and chief operating officer in 1995. He held the position until 2002, developing the "Agenda for Excellence," a university-wide strategic plan and implemented a strategy in the University City neighborhood to raise property values, reduce crime and attract commercial infrastructure and economic development.

=== Franklin & Marshall College ===
Fry was the president of Franklin & Marshall College from 2002 to 2010. During his tenure, the average SAT score of students rose by 63 points over seven years, the ratio of students to faculty was lowered to 10:1, and the college created a faculty-led, student-governed College House system.

=== Drexel University ===
On March 10, 2010, he was designated as the 14th president of Drexel University effective on August 1, 2010. He succeeded the interim president Celestino Pennoni, who served since the death of the 13th president Constantine Papadakis.

Fry's inaugural address set an early agenda featuring three major objectives: to make Drexel "one of academe's most powerful engines for neighborhood improvement and regional economic growth"; to "mobilize [Drexel's] entrepreneurial and creative energies to confront major threats to human health, economic prosperity, and the environment"; and to "[maximize] Drexel's global reputation and impact."

In 2011, Fry negotiated Drexel's affiliation with America's oldest natural history museum, The Academy of Natural Sciences of Philadelphia, creating The Academy of Natural Sciences of Drexel University. In 2012, Fry announced the completion of the Drexel strategic plan from 2012 to 2017, "Transforming the Modern Urban University."

Fundraising efforts have increased recently under Fry with great success. Recent gifts include $45 million from Dana and David Dornsife for the Dornsife School of Public Health and $50 million from Thomas R. Kline for the Kline School of Law. Faculty and staff participation rates in fundraising campaigns have also increased from 12 to 62 percent. Fry is active in local and national matters of education and urban economic development. He served from 2014 to 2017 as a member of the board of directors of the American Council on Education. Fry was the founding chairman of the University City District and served a two-year term as chairman of the Chamber of Commerce for Greater Philadelphia, leaving the post in 2018.

Fry wore doctoral regalia at university ceremonies before receiving an honorary doctorate from Gratz College in 2019. Fry received a 26.9% salary hike as per sources within a year. His leadership coincided with scandals related to misuse of federal grants and the dismissal of tenured faculty due to public reaction to their tweets.

== Personal life ==
Fry and his wife Cara, an art historian, have three children.

Fry is also an avid squash player in his free time and the sport has thrived on campus under his leadership. Since 2011 the US Squash Open has been held on Drexel's campus in the Daskalakis Athletic Center. Fry was also chair of the board of directors for US Squash from 2013 to 2016, and was instrumental in bringing the US Squash Open to Drexel.
