= Goodwin College of Professional Studies =

Higher education college at Drexel University, Philadelphia, Pennsylvania, U.S.

Coordinates: 39.95521°N 75.18468°W

Richard C. Goodwin College of Professional Studies
- Established: 1892
- Affiliations: Drexel University
- Dean: William F. Lynch
- Administrative staff: 50 full-time faculty 400+ adjunct faculty 46 full-time staff
- Students: 272 full-time 1,694 part-time
- Location: Philadelphia, Pennsylvania, US
- Campus: University City Campus
- Website: www.drexel.edu/goodwin/

The Richard C. Goodwin College of Professional Studies is a higher education college at Drexel University, Philadelphia.

== History ==
Established shortly after the founding of Drexel as the Department of Lectures and Evening Classes, the College of Professional Studies has been a part of the school since 1892 under nine names. In 1896, the Department of Lectures and Evening Classes was renamed as the Department of Evening Courses. In 1918, during Hollis Godfrey's internal reorganization, it was renamed the Evening School. When degrees were offered through the school in 1924, it was renamed once again to the Evening Diploma School, from then it became known as the Evening College and Diploma School (1950–1965), and the Evening College (1965–1987). In 1987, it was renamed University College and remained that until it was merged with the Drexel University College of Arts and Sciences in 1993. In 1997, the college was brought back as the College of Evening and Professional Studies and underwent its last name change to the Goodwin College of Professional Studies in 2001 in honor of alumnus Richard C. Goodwin.

Goodwin's provides programs and services to part-time adult undergraduate, graduate, and lifelong learning individual and corporate consumers as well as traditional full-time undergraduates including credit and non-credit courses and programs and academically related services for the Philadelphia region, Northern California.

In fall 2008, Goodwin College merged with Drexel's School of Education. In conjunction with this merge, a new school was formed within Goodwin called the School of Technology & Professional Studies, which includes the academic programs previously housed within Goodwin College prior the merge.

Included in this merge was The Math Forum, a web-based center for mathematics and mathematics education, which moved to Drexel in 2002 under the leadership of former university president Constantine Papadakis (1946–2009). The Math Forum is composed of teachers, mathematicians, researchers, students, and parents. They offer problems and puzzles; online mentoring; research; team problem-solving; collaborations; and professional development.

Shortly thereafter, the Center for the Prevention of School-Aged Violence and Drexel-Torrance Center for Creativity became part of Goodwin.

== Academic programs ==
Undergraduate degree-completion program:

- General Studies

Graduate (Master of Science) programs:

- Nonprofit Management: Public, Professional & Social Sectors
- Professional Studies
- Project Management

== Academic Bistro ==
The Academic Bistro is Drexel University's student-run restaurant and lounge, located on the sixth floor of the Academic Building (33rd and Arch Streets, Philadelphia). The space includes commercial kitchens, dining room, conference room, and lounge.

The Hospitality Management, Culinary Science, and Culinary Arts programs run the Academic Bistro, which is intended to give students hands-on experience. The Bistro is open to the public for lunch or dinner on select weekdays during the academic year and is also available for private events, by reservation.
