= Celestino Pennoni =

American civil engineer

President of Drexel University Interim
- In office 2009–2010
- Succeeded by: John Anderson Fry
- In office 1994–1995
- Succeeded by: Constantine Papadakis

Personal details
- Born: Celestino Robert Pennoni; December 31, 1937 (age 88)
- Spouse: Annette C. Ribar (m. 1959; died 2019)
- Education: Drexel University (B.S., M.S.)

Celestino "Chuck" Robert Pennoni (born December 31, 1937) is an American engineer and academic who currently serves as the Chairman Emeritus of Pennoni Associates Inc., a consulting engineering firm headquartered in Philadelphia. He has also served as interim president of Drexel University twice, from 1994 to 1995 and 2009 to 2010.

== Early life and education ==
Celestino "Chuck" Pennoni is the youngest of five children and only son of immigrants from Perugia, Italy, Annavillia and Celestino. He was raised in Plains Township, Luzerne County, and graduated from Plains Township High School in Northeastern Pennsylvania. Pennoni received his B.S. and M.S. degrees in civil engineering from Drexel University in 1963 and 1966, respectively.

== Career ==
Pennoni began working part-time for the engineering firm of engineering firm Albright and Friel while he was in college and began working for the Philadelphia Department of Public Works after he graduated. He formed his own company in 1966, which grew from a structural engineering practice with a single worker into a firm with a multidiscipline consulting firm with over 1,200 employees.

Pennoni served as the president of the American Society of Civil Engineers (ASCE) in 1992. During the early 1980s, he had advocated to relocate ASCE's headquarters from New York City to the Washington, D.C. area; Pennoni later served as the prime negotiator in the real estate sale of ASCE's former headquarters in Manhattan to Donald Trump.

Pennoni has served as trustee to Drexel University from 1993 to 2006, and as chairman of the board from 1997 to 2003. In March 2003, Drexel University's honors college was named the Pennoni Honors College. Pennoni served as interim president at Drexel from 1994 to 1995, as well as from 2009 to 2010. In 1995, he was succeeded by Constantine Papadakis, and in August 2010, he was succeeded by John Anderson Fry.

== Honors ==
Pennoni received an honorary doctorate from Drexel University in 1992. In 2000, he was elected a member of the National Academy of Engineering "For advancing innovative principles in the art and science of engineering, engineering education, and engineering management". Pennoni was named as the 52nd recipient of the Drexel University Business Leader of the Year award in 2005.
