= Thomas R. Kline =

American lawyer (born 1947)

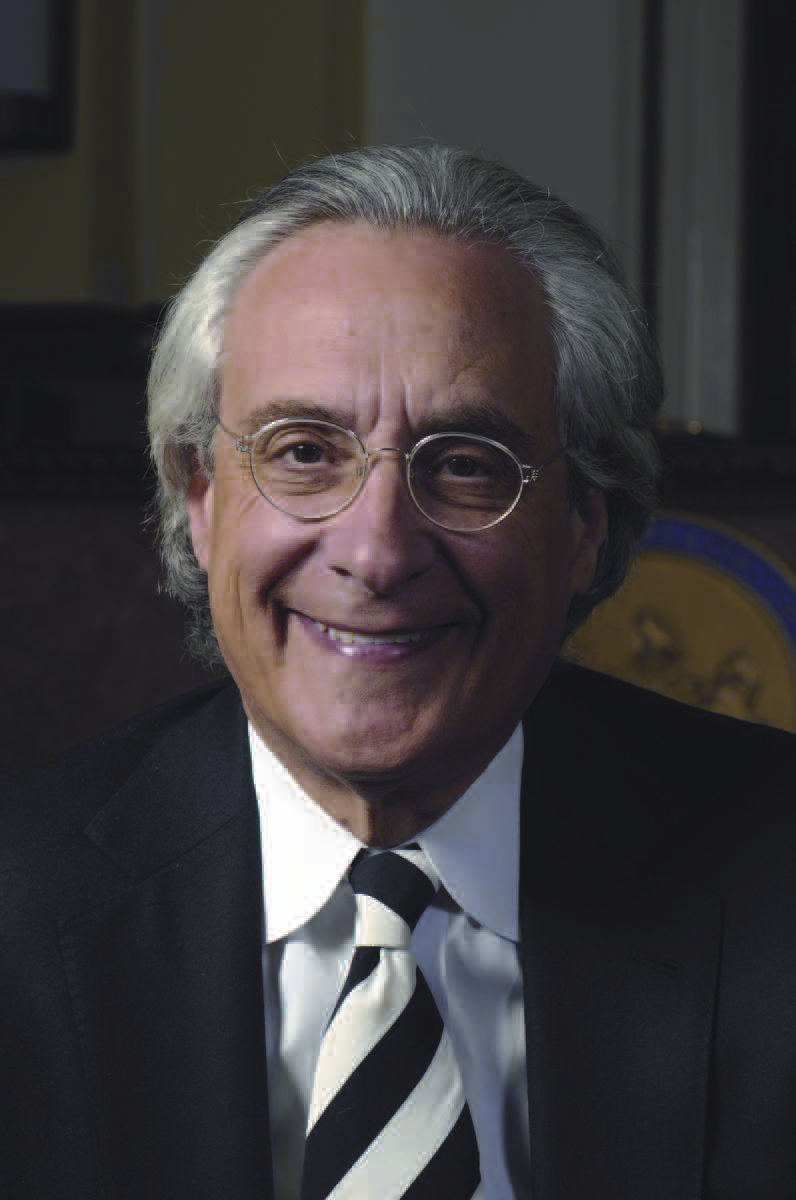
- Kline in 2012
- Born: 1947 (age 78–79); Hazleton, Pennsylvania, U.S.
- Education: Albright College; Lehigh University; Duquesne University School of Law
- Occupation: Personal injury attorney
- Website: www.klinespecter.com

Thomas R. Kline (born 1947) is an American personal injury attorney. His cases have helped shape Pennsylvania law and resulted in corporate, institutional, and governmental changes throughout the civil justice system. The law schools at Drexel University and Duquesne University are named for Kline. He is a partner in Kline & Specter and a member and past president (2008-2009) of the Inner Circle of Advocates.

== Education ==
Kline earned his undergraduate degree from Albright College in Reading, Pennsylvania, where he was awarded the school's Distinguished Alumni award. He attended Lehigh University in Bethlehem, Pennsylvania, where he earned a master's degree in American history and completed Ph.D. course work. Kline attended Duquesne University School of Law, graduating with the Distinguished Student Award and later receiving the school's Distinguished Alumni Award. He went on to work as law clerk to Pennsylvania Supreme Court Justice Thomas W. Pomeroy.

== Legal career ==
Kline was born in 1947 in Hazleton, Pennsylvania, in the Pennsylvania anthracite coal region. His father worked as a dress factory manager. Kline taught sixth grade for several years before attending law school. Following law school, Kline was an associate at The Beasley Firm in Philadelphia before partnering with Shanin Specter to open their own firm, Kline & Specter, in 1995. In addition to his work as an attorney, Kline has appeared on television news programs as a part of discussions regarding law and legal issues, including providing commentary on ABC World News and Good Morning America. Another example of his television appearances is an edition of ABC's Nightline, which featured a case he won for a woman who died after a missed diagnosis of breast cancer.

Kline's cases include the Vioxx litigation, which resulted in a $4.85 billion settlement paid by Merck & Co, for which he served as a member of the Plaintiff's Steering Committee that directed the federal MDL proceedings against Merck. In the civil rights case Hall v. SEPTA, Kline won a $51 million award against the Philadelphia mass transit agency for a boy whose foot was torn off in a subway escalator. In Davis v. Motiva Enterprises, a 2013 case of Kline's, there was a $36.4 million settlement against an oil refinery operator in the death of a worker killed in an explosion in which he fell into a tank of sulfuric acid.

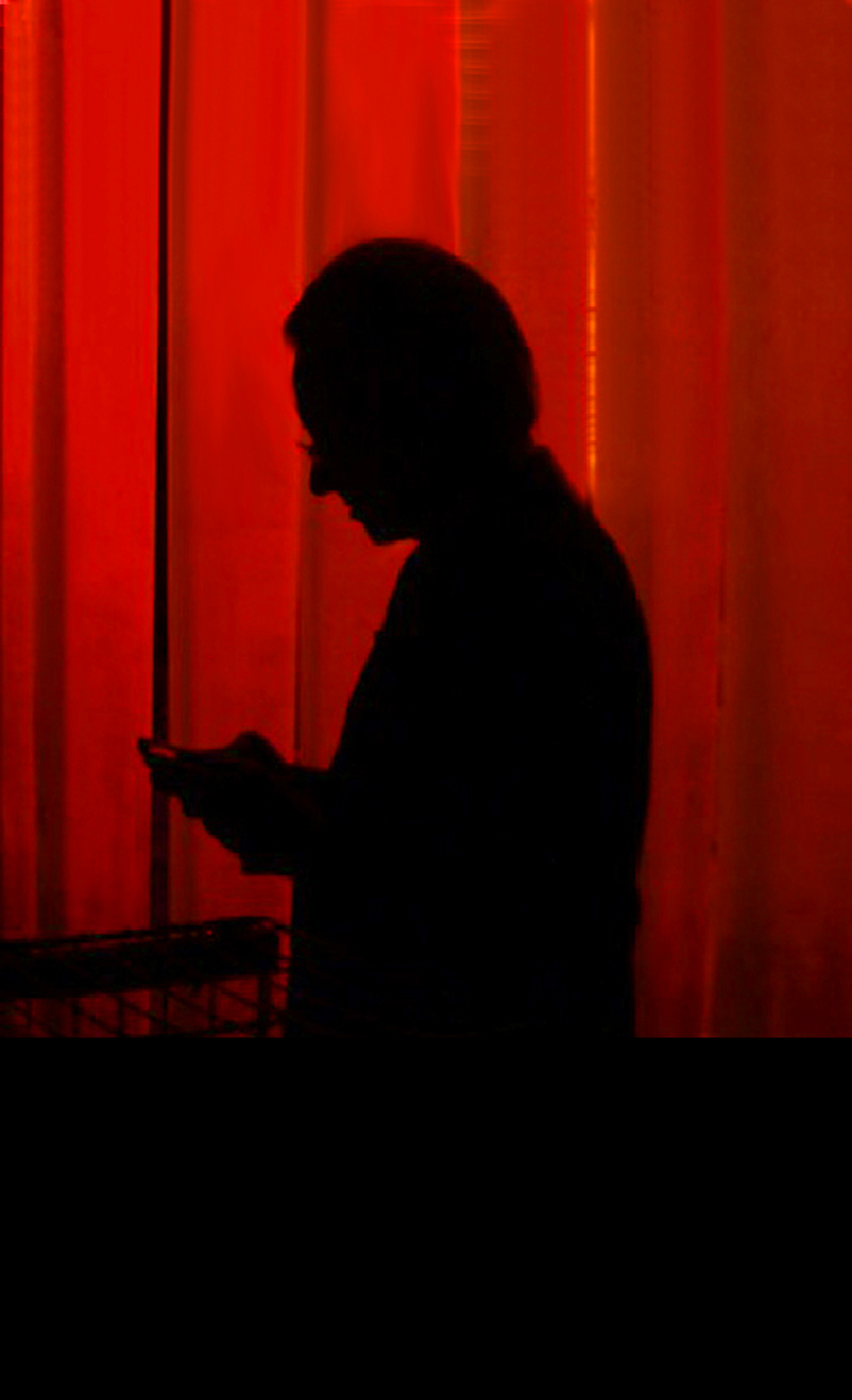
Kline in Trial As Theatre, 2009

In Manlove v. Scully Co. Kline was lead attorney for 11 of 12 plaintiffs in an apartment explosion case that resulted in a $40.5 million settlement. In that case, six people died and six were injured in a 2001 explosion and fire that erupted at a Montgomery County, Pennsylvania, apartment complex after heavy flooding dislodged a gas dryer. In the 2010 case Leach v. Chad Youth Enhancement Center, Kline reached a settlement of $10.5 million. This was a federal lawsuit in the case of a Philadelphia teenager who died after he was placed in a restraint hold at a Tennessee treatment center. In the December 2011 verdict in Zauflik v. Pennsbury School District, Kline's case resulted in a $14 million verdict for a teenager who lost her leg after she was run over by a school bus at her high school.

== Theatre career ==
Kline has written and performed three productions of his show titled Trial as Theatre.

== Awards and recognition ==
In 2000 Kline was named by the National Law Journal among its "Ten of America's Top Litigators" following the Hall v. SEPTA case. Kline was chosen for nine consecutive years (2004–2012) as the No. 1 attorney in Pennsylvania by Super Lawyers. The publication Best Lawyers selected Kline as its "Lawyer of the Year" for 2013 for Philadelphia Medical Malpractice and in a previous year as its Philadelphia Personal Injury Litigator of the Year. He is also an elected member of the American Law Institute.

== Philanthropy ==
Tom Kline is chair of the Board of Advisors of the Drexel University Thomas R. Kline School of Law, previously known as the Earle Mack School of Law and is a member of the Board of Trustees of Drexel University. On September 17, 2014, it was announced that he donated $50 million to Drexel University to rename its law school and develop the Thomas R. Kline Institute of Trial Advocacy of the Kline School of Law. On September 7, 2022, it was similarly announced that he donated $50 million to Duquesne University School of Law; accordingly, the school has been renamed the Thomas R. Kline School of Law of Duquesne University.
