= Thomas R. Kline School of Law (Drexel University) =

Law school of Drexel University

Coordinates: 39.9554°N 75.1904°W

Drexel University Thomas R. Kline School of Law
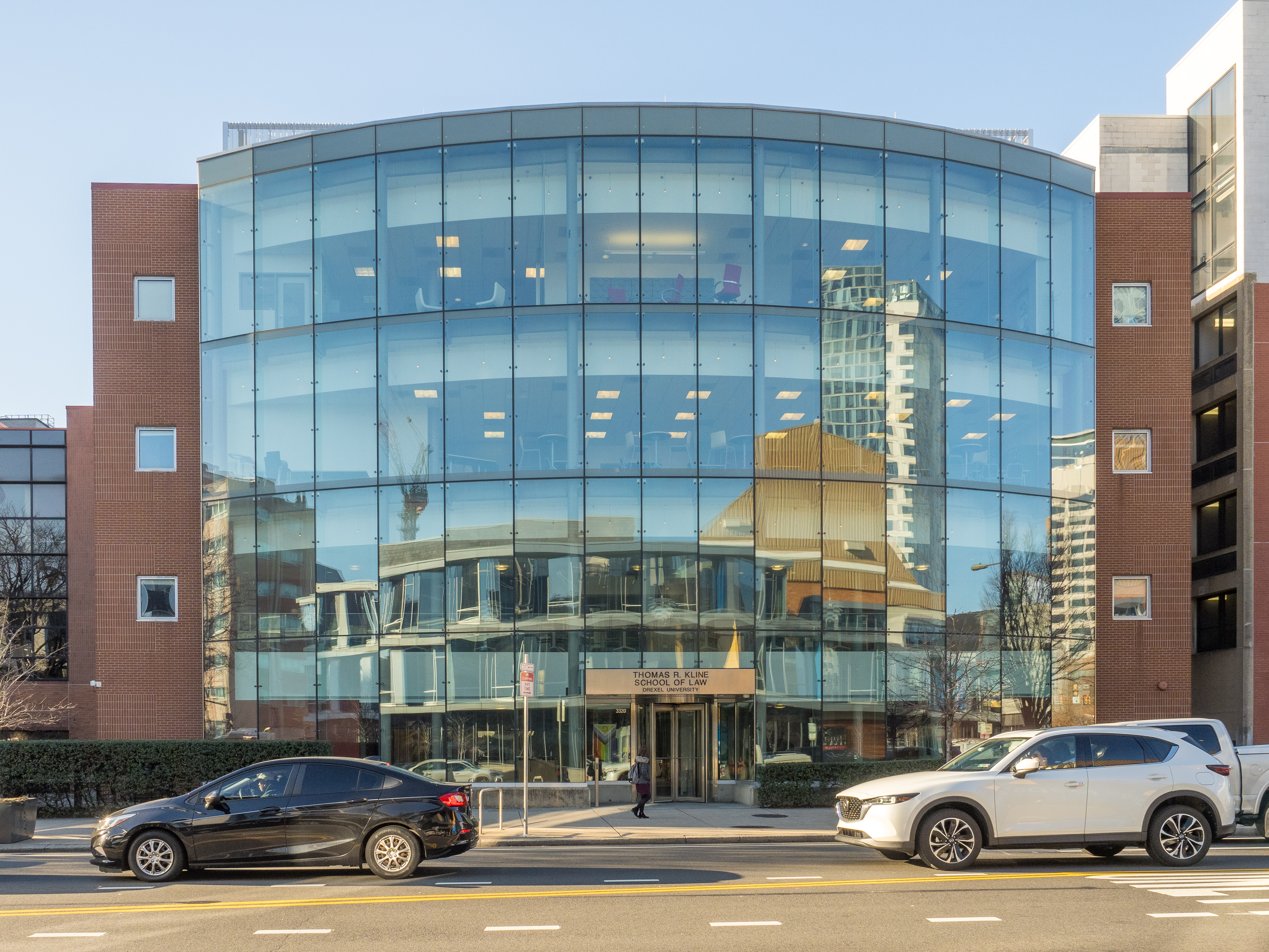
- Motto: Scientia, Ars, Officium; Knowledge, Skill, Duty
- Parent school: Drexel University
- Established: 2006; 20 years ago
- Parent endowment: $722 million (2016)
- Dean: Daniel M. Filler
- Location: Philadelphia, Pennsylvania, US
- Enrollment: 420
- Faculty: 39 (full–time); 101 (part–time)
- USNWR ranking: 79th (tied) (2025)
- Bar pass rate: 85% (2024 first–time takers)
- Website: drexel.edu/law

The Drexel University Thomas R. Kline School of Law (previously the "Earle Mack School of Law") is the law school of Drexel University, a private research university in Philadelphia, Pennsylvania, United States. Established in 2006, it offers Juris Doctor, LLM and Master of Legal Studies degrees and provides for its students to take part in a cooperative education program.

== History ==
In 2005, Drexel University announced its plans to create a new law school adjacent to the Drexel University Main Campus W. W. Hagerty library in West Philadelphia. That same year Drexel received approval from the Pennsylvania Department of Education to start the school. The decision to launch a law school with cooperative education in a city with five other law schools was based on a demand for graduates with immediate experience, with the president of Drexel University, Constantine Papadakis, saying that employers "like to hire a graduate and have them immediately be useful." The School of Law joins Temple University, University of Pennsylvania, Villanova University, Rutgers University, and Widener University to become the sixth law school in the Philadelphia metropolitan area. The School of Law is the first new law school to be opened by a doctoral university in a 25-year period nationwide.

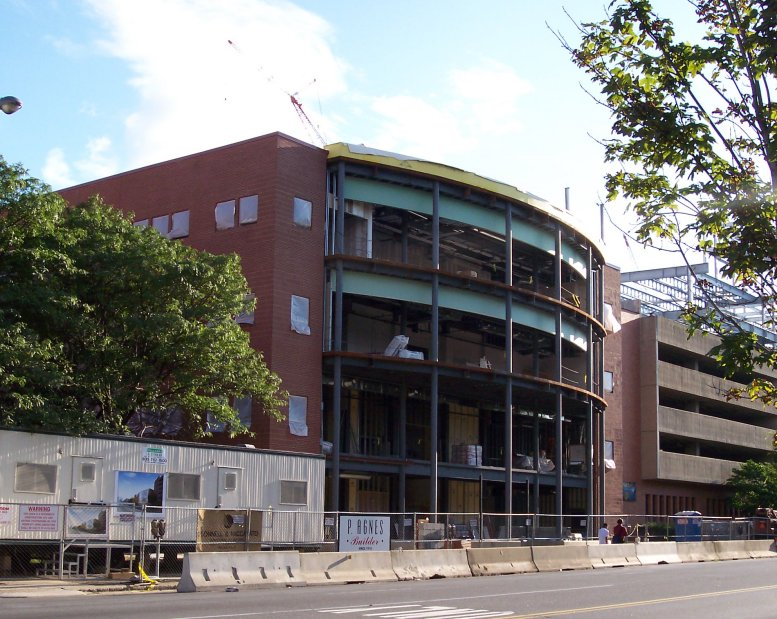
The School of Law building during construction in 2006

The School of Law's inaugural class began classes on August 16, 2006. Due to a shortage of construction materials in 2006, caused in part by the need in the gulf coast due to Hurricane Katrina, construction on the building was delayed, resulting in classes being held on Drexel University's Main Campus and within the Jenkins Law Library and the auditorium of the National Constitution Center. The first class was expected to be composed of 120 students; ultimately, the inaugural class consisted of 183 students with an incoming median GPA of 3.4 and a median LSAT score of 156. On May 1, 2008, the Drexel University College of Law was renamed the Earle Mack School of Law in honor of Earle I. Mack, a Drexel University alumnus, after a donation of $15 million.

In 2013, the school's name was changed from Earle Mack School of Law to Drexel University School of Law to create new fund-raising opportunities by opening the naming rights.

In 2014, it received a $50 million gift from Thomas R. Kline, a trial lawyer in Philadelphia, and was renamed after him. The gift, which was the single largest in Drexel University's history and the fifth largest received by a law school, was designated for the support of scholarship and to enhance the school's Trial Advocacy Program. The gift includes the conveyance of an historic building designed by Horace Trumbauer. The Kline Institute of Trial Advocacy, or KITA, located at 1200 Chestnut Street at the former Benefical Bank Headquarters Building, is used for courtroom simulations, Continuing Legal Education (CLE) programs, and development of the Master of Laws (LLM) program.

== Academics ==
The school offers Juris Doctor, LLM and Master of Legal Studies degrees, as well as joint-degree programs for those pursuing a degree through Drexel University's LeBow College of Business, School of Public Health, Department of Psychology and Center for Public Policy. It received provisional accreditation from the American Bar Association in February 2008 enabling the first graduating class, 2009, to take the bar exam upon graduation. The school offers optional concentrations in business and entrepreneurship law, criminal law, health law, and intellectual property law and as of 2019 has 134 full and part-time faculty members. The School of Law is the first to have enrolled all of its students in the Philadelphia Bar Association's Young Lawyers Section. The students also have automatic membership to the Jenkins Law Library. In addition to admittance to the Law Library students also publish a Law Review, Drexel Law Review, which is published semiannually. In August 2011, after three years of being provisionally accredited, the American Bar Association granted the School of Law full accreditation.

=== Cooperative education ===
The front glass panels of the School of Law building

Like Drexel University's cooperative education program, the School of Law offers cooperative education for its students. The School of Law is the second law school in the country to have a co-op program for law students, the first being Northeastern University. The first co-op cycle for the school started in September 2007 and over ninety area corporations, law offices, judiciary positions, non-profit organizations, and government offices offered internship positions.

During their first year at school students concentrate on basics such as legal writing and contracts before starting their first six-month co-op cycle. In order to be eligible to participate in the program students must complete their first year with a minimum GPA and satisfy any job orientation that is required. While on co-op students are required to work at least 20 hours a week at their position and take an additional 3 credit hours in either a class or an approved academic program.

Beginning with the class that enrolled in 2014, all students are required to complete at least one co-op placement or a clinical placement in addition to providing a minimum of 50 hours of pro bono service.

=== Admissions ===
For the class entering in 2024, the law school accepted 37.79% of applicants, with 22.66% of those accepted enrolling. The median enrollee had a 158 LSAT score and 3.72 undergraduate GPA. Two students were not included in the GPA calculation, and one student was not included in the LSAT calculation. Its 25th/75th percentile LSAT scores and GPAs were 153/160 and 3.45/3.85.

=== Rankings ===
In 2025, U.S. News & World Report ranked Drexel tied for the 79th best law school in the U.S.

From 2006–2011 the School of Law went "unranked" on the U.S. News & World Report as provisionally accredited law schools cannot be ranked. On the 2020 list of "Best Law Schools" by the U.S. News & World Report the School of Law was ranked 93 out of 196 schools. In 2025, the law school's Trial Advocacy program was ranked tied for 8th; the Health Law program was ranked tied for 20th, the Clinical Training program was ranked tied for 71st, the Legal Writing program was ranked tied for 44st, Business/Corporate Law tied for 88th, Constitutional Law tied for 86th, Contracts/Commercial Law tied for 106th, Dispute Resolution tied for 102nd, Intellectual Property Law tied for 89th, and International Law tied for 125th.

== Career planning ==
=== Placement ===
According to Drexel's official 2019 ABA-required disclosures, 80.6% of the Class of 2018 obtained full-time, long-term, JD-required employment (i.e., as attorneys) nine months after graduation.

ABA Employment Summary for 2019 Graduates
Employment Status	Percentage
Employed - Bar Passage Required	80.6%
Employed - J.D. Advantage	9.7%
Employed - Professional Position	3.0%
Employed - Non-Professional Position	0%
Employed - Undeterminable	0%
Pursuing Graduate Degree Full Time	2.2%
Unemployed - Start Date Deferred	0%
Unemployed - Not Seeking	0%
Unemployed - Seeking	3.0%
Employment Status Unknown	1.5%
Total of 134 Graduates

=== Costs ===
The total cost of attendance (indicating the cost of tuition, fees, and living expenses) at Drexel for the 2014–2015 academic year is $62,842. The website Law School Transparency estimated debt-financed cost of attendance for three years is $234,910. Based on cost of attendance and financial aid data (that the law school is required by the American Bar Association to disclose to prospective students), the average accumulated debt for students who graduated in 2013 was $98,820.

== Facilities ==
In 2005, the Philadelphia Planning Commission approved Drexel's then estimated $13 million temporary law school. Construction on the temporary law school building began in the fall of 2006 and was completed during the winter term. The $14 million building opened for classes on January 8, 2007.

The 65,000-square-foot (6,000 m^{2}) complex features a moot courtroom, a two-floor library, a two-story atrium for meetings and casual conversation, faculty/staff offices, and several rooms available for students to meet and work. The building also shares Drexel's campus-wide wireless Internet access.

The law school also has a second building, the Kline Institute of Trial Advocacy located at 1200 Chestnut St, Philadelphia, PA 19107. This building features a mock courtroom built to scale to replicate real trials for students.
