= Antonio Merlo =

American economist

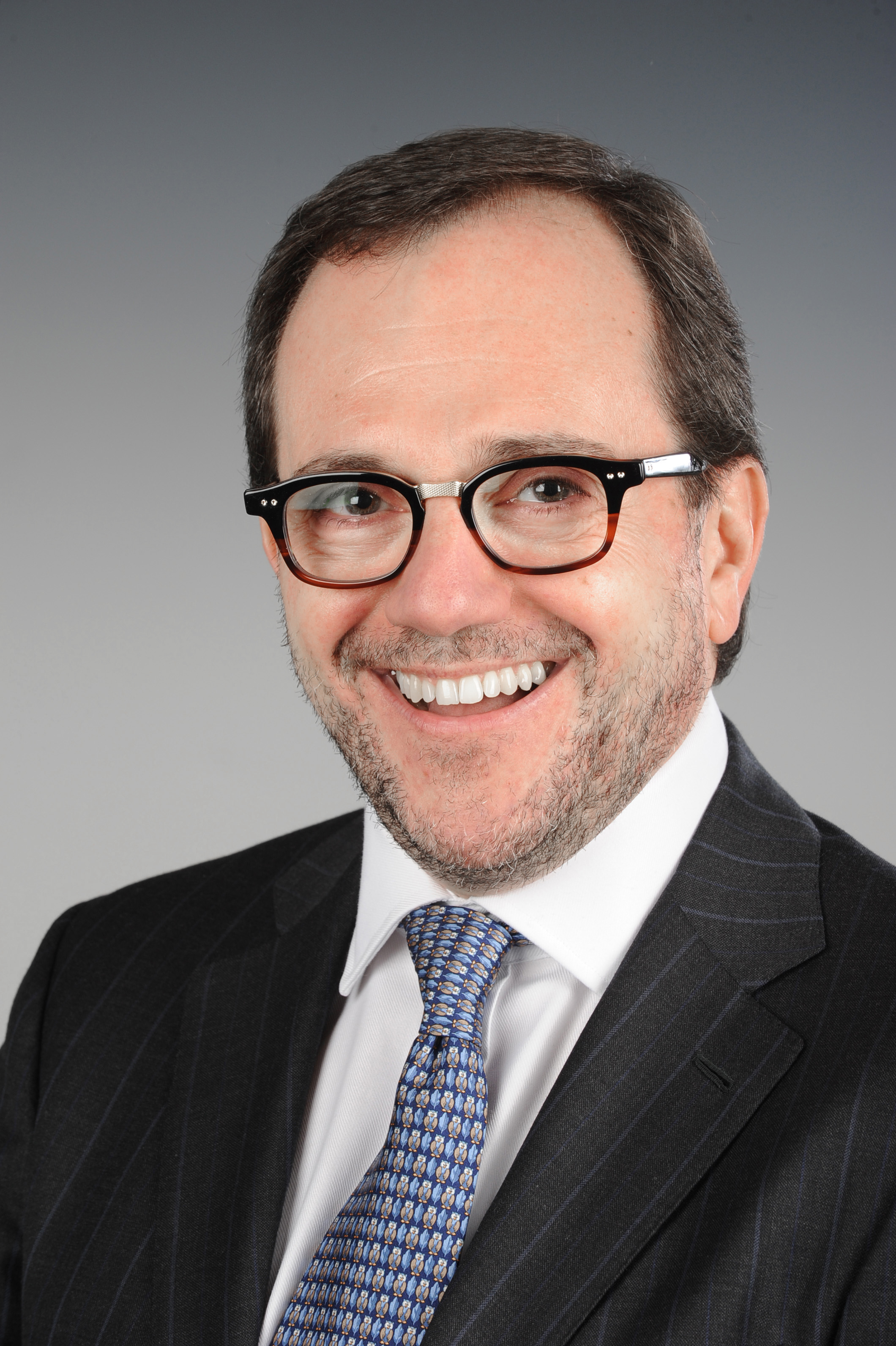
- Born: Legnano, Italy

Academic background
- Education: Bocconi University (Laurea); New York University (Ph.D.)

Academic work
- Discipline: Political economy
- Institutions: Drexel University

Antonio Merlo (born 1963 (age 62–63)) is an Italian-born American economist and academic who is the president of Drexel University.

== Early life ==
Antonio Merlo was born in Legnano, Italy in 1963. A first-generation college graduate, he received a Laurea summa cum laude in economics and social sciences from Bocconi University in Milan in 1987. Merlo immigrated to the United States in 1988 and earned a PhD in economics from New York University in 1992.

== Career ==
Merlo began his academic career in 1992 as an assistant professor of economics at the University of Minnesota, where he was promoted to associate professor with tenure in 1998. Between 1998 and 2000 he held a joint appointment in the Department of Economics and the Department of Politics at New York University. In 2000, he joined the faculty at the University of Pennsylvania, where he held the Lawrence Klein Chair of Economics and the Directorship of the Penn Institute for Economic Research (PIER) until 2014. He was also the chair of the economics department from 2009 to 2012. In 2014, Merlo joined Rice University as the George A. Peterkin Professor of Economics, the chair of the economics department, and the Founding Director of the Rice Initiative for the Study of Economics (RISE). From 2016 to 2019, he served as dean of the Rice University School of Social Sciences. In 2019, Merlo returned to his alma mater as the Anne and Joel Ehrenkranz Dean of NYU's Faculty of Arts and Science and Professor of Economics. On January 31, 2025, officials at Drexel University announced that Merlo had been selected to be that institution's sixteenth President, effective July 1, 2025.

In 2012, Merlo was elected a Fellow of the Econometric Society. In 2014, he delivered the Vilfredo Pareto Lecture at the Collegio Carlo Alberto. Merlo's areas of expertise are political economy, policy analysis, public economics, bargaining theory and applications, and empirical microeconomics. His research interests include the economics of crime, voting, the career decisions of politicians, the formation and dissolution of coalition governments, the industrial organization of the political sector, household bargaining and the study of the residential housing market. He has published numerous articles in the leading journals in the profession, including the American Economic Review, Econometrica, the Journal of Political Economy, and the Review of Economic Studies.

As of September 2026, Merlo quietly moved to close the 200-year-old Academy of Natural Sciences, only giving the public a month of warning without any chance at fundraising or discussion. Merlo claims that this decision was made due to lack of attendance following the COVID-19 pandemic. Merlo did not attend the Philadelphia City Council hearing on the Academy's closure, which earned criticism from councilmembers and prompted the council to issue a subpoena for Merlo.

== Books ==
- The Ruling Class Management and Politics in Modern Italy (with Tito Boeri and Andrea Prat, Oxford University Press, 2010) ISBN 9780199588282
- Political Economy and Policy Analysis (Routledge, 2019) ISBN 9781138591776

== Other leadership positions ==
From 2008 to 2014, Merlo was the head coach of the men's water polo team of the University of Pennsylvania. He led the Penn Quakers to three championship titles in the Mid-Atlantic Division of the Collegiate Water Polo Association (CWPA) in 2008, 2010, and 2013, the 2013 Ivy League Collegiate Club Championship, and a fifth-place finish at the National Collegiate Club Championship in 2013. From 2016 to 2019, Merlo was the head coach of the men's and women's water polo teams at Rice University. In 2013, 2017, and 2018, he won Coach of the Year in the CWPA men's Mid-Atlantic Division, women's Texas Division, and men's Texas Division, respectively.
