= Pennoni Honors College =

- Established: 2002 (Honors Program established 1991)
- Dean: Neville Vakharia, PhD
- Students: 1000+
- Location: Philadelphia, Pennsylvania, USA
- Campus: University City Campus
- Affiliations: Drexel University

Pennoni Honors College, also called the C.R. and Annette Pennoni Honors College, is a college of Drexel University tasked with recognizing and promoting excellence among Drexel students. Unlike the other colleges, Pennoni Honors College encompasses students who are also in one of the other colleges, but have applied to and been selected to be a part of the Honors Program and/or participate in the Custom-Designed Major. The College offers dedicated housing in Bentley Hall, specialized academic advisors, seminar rooms, lounge space, early course registration, tickets to Philadelphia cultural events, and specialty courses.

== Graduation with Honors ==
Most Honors students who complete the minimum requirements for membership are invited to graduate with Honors from Pennoni Honors College. This achievement is noted as such on an official University transcript and graduates from the Honors Program will be listed in the University Commencement Program as a Pennoni Honors College graduate.

In order to qualify for graduation with Honors, a student must successfully complete a minimum of 16 Honors credits and maintain an overall GPA of 3.2 or higher. All Honors credits must be completed and confirmed prior to the June Honors Graduation date.

== Graduation with Distinction ==
Graduation with Distinction is the highest honor awarded by the Honors Program and the Pennoni Honors College to its most accomplished students. This achievement is noted as such on an official University transcript and students meeting Graduation with Distinction will be listed in the University Commencement Program as a Pennoni Honors College Graduate with Distinction.
