= Constantine Papadakis =

American academic administrator (1946–2009)

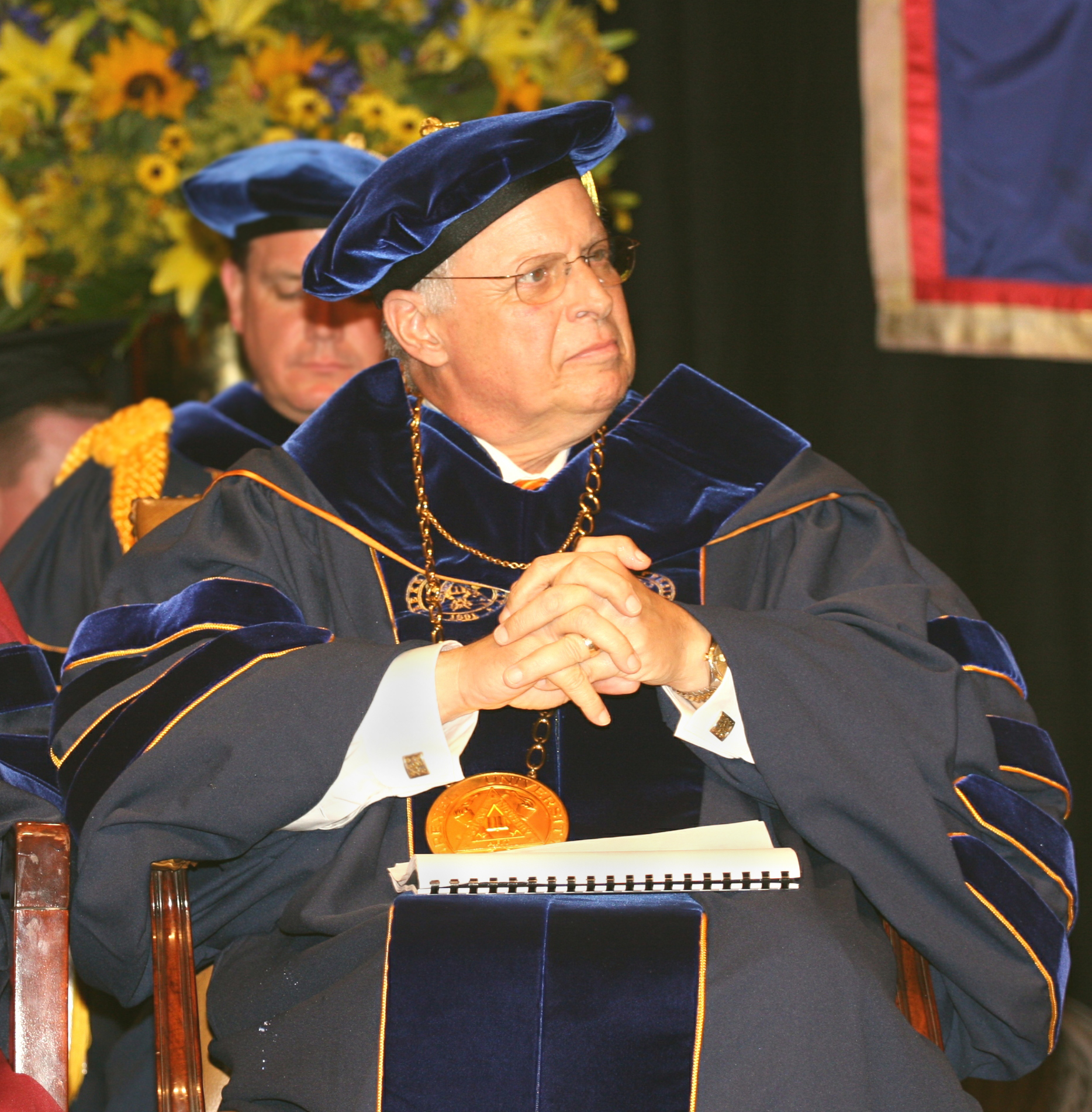

12th president of Drexel University
- In office 1995–2009
- Preceded by: C. R. "Chuck" Pennoni (interim)
- Succeeded by: C. R. "Chuck" Pennoni (interim); John Anderson Fry

Personal details
- Born: February 2, 1946
- Died: April 6, 2009 (aged 63)
- Education: National Technical University of Athens (Diplom); University of Cincinnati (MS); University of Michigan (PhD)

Constantine Papadakis (February 2, 1946 – April 5, 2009) was a Greek-American businessman and the president of Drexel University.

== Academic career ==
Papadakis received his diploma in civil engineering from the National Technical University of Athens in Greece. He came to the United States in 1969 to continue his studies in civil engineering and earn his master's degree from the University of Cincinnati. He then went on to earn his doctorate in civil engineering in 1973 from the University of Michigan.

Papadakis served as head of the civil engineering department at Colorado State University and then dean of University of Cincinnati's College of Engineering prior to 1995. He was appointed President of Drexel University in Philadelphia, Pennsylvania in 1995 and held that position until his death in 2009. During his tenure, Papadakis doubled the full-time undergraduate enrollment, tripled freshman applications, quintupled the university's endowment, and quintupled research funding. His salary of $805,000 was the sixth highest among university presidents. After his death Papadakis' total earnings, including life insurance payout, was estimated at over $4 million.

== Other activities ==
Papadakis sat on the Philadelphia Stock Exchange as chairman of the compensation committee. He also served on the board of trustees of the Hellenic College and Holy Cross Greek Orthodox School of Theology.

== Death ==
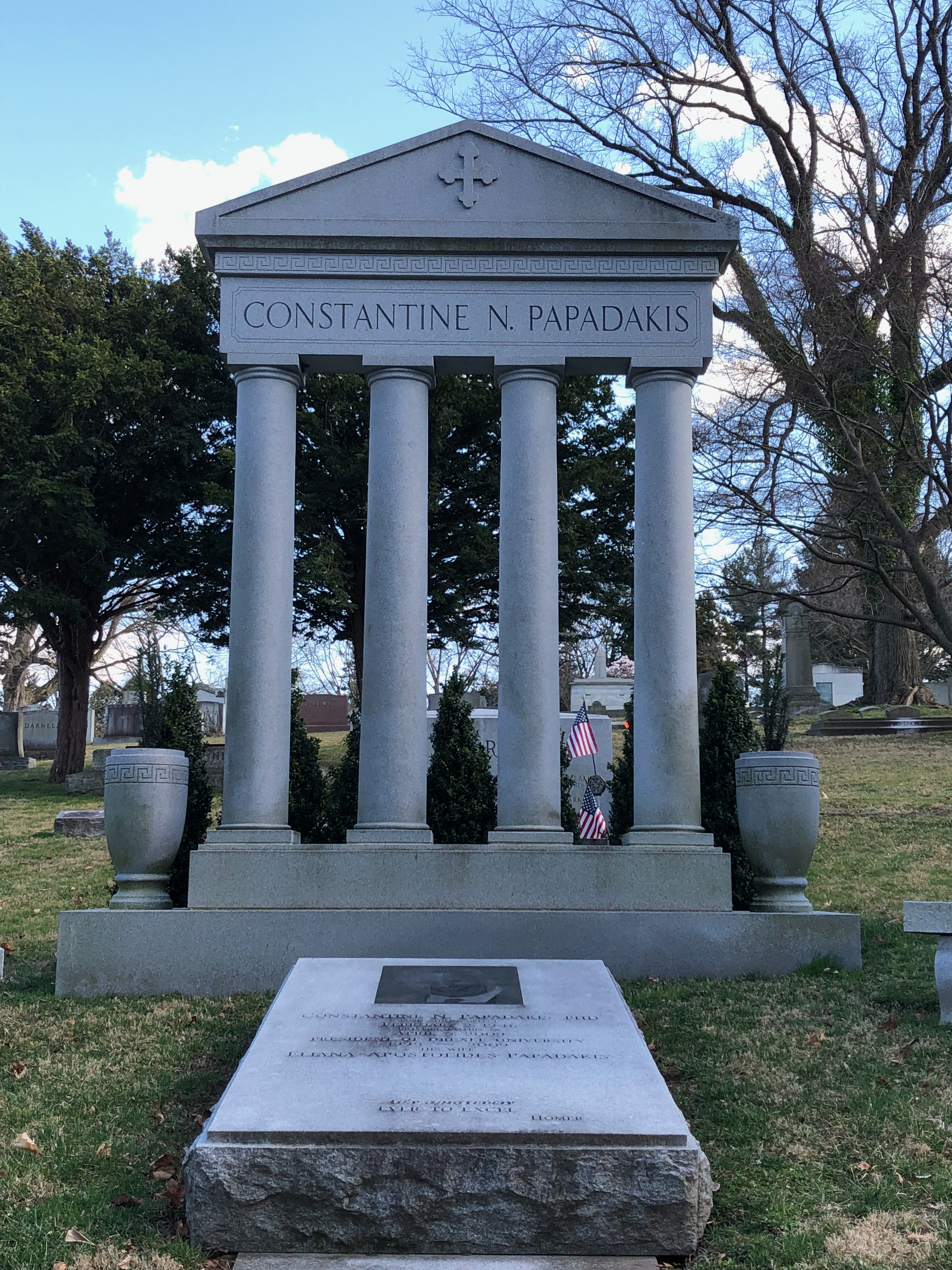
The grave of Constantine Papadakis at West Laurel Hill Cemetery in Bala Cynwyd, Pennsylvania

Papadakis died at the Hospital of the University of Pennsylvania in Philadelphia, from pulmonary complications due to pneumonia on April 5, 2009 after battling lung cancer for months. He was 63 years old.
