= Drexel University =

Private university in Philadelphia, Pennsylvania, US

- Former names: List: Drexel Institute of Art, Science, & Industry (1891–1936); Drexel Institute of Technology (1936–1970); Female Medical College of Pennsylvania (1850–1867); Woman's Medical College of Pennsylvania (1867–1970); Medical College of Pennsylvania (1970–1993); Homeopathic Medical College of Pennsylvania (1848–1869); Hahnemann Medical College of Philadelphia (1869–1981); Hahneman University (1981–1993); MCP Hahnemann School of Medicine (1993–1996); Allegheny University of the Health Sciences (1996–1998); MCP Hahnemann University (1998–2002); Academy of Natural Sciences (1812–2011); Pennsylvania State College of Optometry (1919–1964); Pennsylvania College of Optometry (1964–2008); Salus University (2008–2025)
- Motto: "Ambition Can't Wait"; On seal: "Art, Science, Industry"
- Type: Private research university
- Established: December 17, 1891; 134 years ago
- Founder: Anthony Joseph Drexel
- Accreditation: MSCHE
- Academic affiliations: NAICU; Space-grant
- Endowment: $1.13 billion (2025)
- President: Antonio Merlo
- Provost: Paul E. Jensen
- Students: 24,205
- Undergraduates: 15,346
- Postgraduates: 8,859
- Location: Philadelphia, Pennsylvania, U.S. 39.954°N 75.188°W
- Campus: 96 acres (0.39 km^{2}) (total) 74 acres (0.30 km^{2}) (University City main campus); Large city
- Other campuses: Wider Philadelphia area, various sites; Malvern; Washington, D.C.
- Newspaper: The Triangle
- Colors: Blue and yellow
- Nickname: Dragons
- Sporting affiliations: NCAA Division I FCS - CAA; EIWA; IRA; CSA; City 6
- Mascot: Mario the Magnificent
- Website: drexel.edu

Drexel University is a private research university with its main campus in Philadelphia, Pennsylvania, United States. Drexel's undergraduate school was founded in 1891 by Anthony J. Drexel, a financier and philanthropist. Founded as Drexel Institute of Art, Science and Industry, it was renamed Drexel Institute of Technology in 1936, before assuming its current name in 1970. As of 2020, more than 24,000 students were enrolled in over 70 undergraduate programs and more than 100 master's, doctoral, and professional programs at the university. Drexel's cooperative education program (co-op) is a unique aspect of the school's degree programs, offering students the opportunity to gain up to 18 months of paid, full-time work experience in a field relevant to their undergraduate major or graduate degree program prior to graduation.

The university is also responsible for the oldest museum of the Americas, the Academy of Natural Sciences, which is expected to close on September 30, 2026, less than a month after the announcement.

== History ==
=== 19th century ===
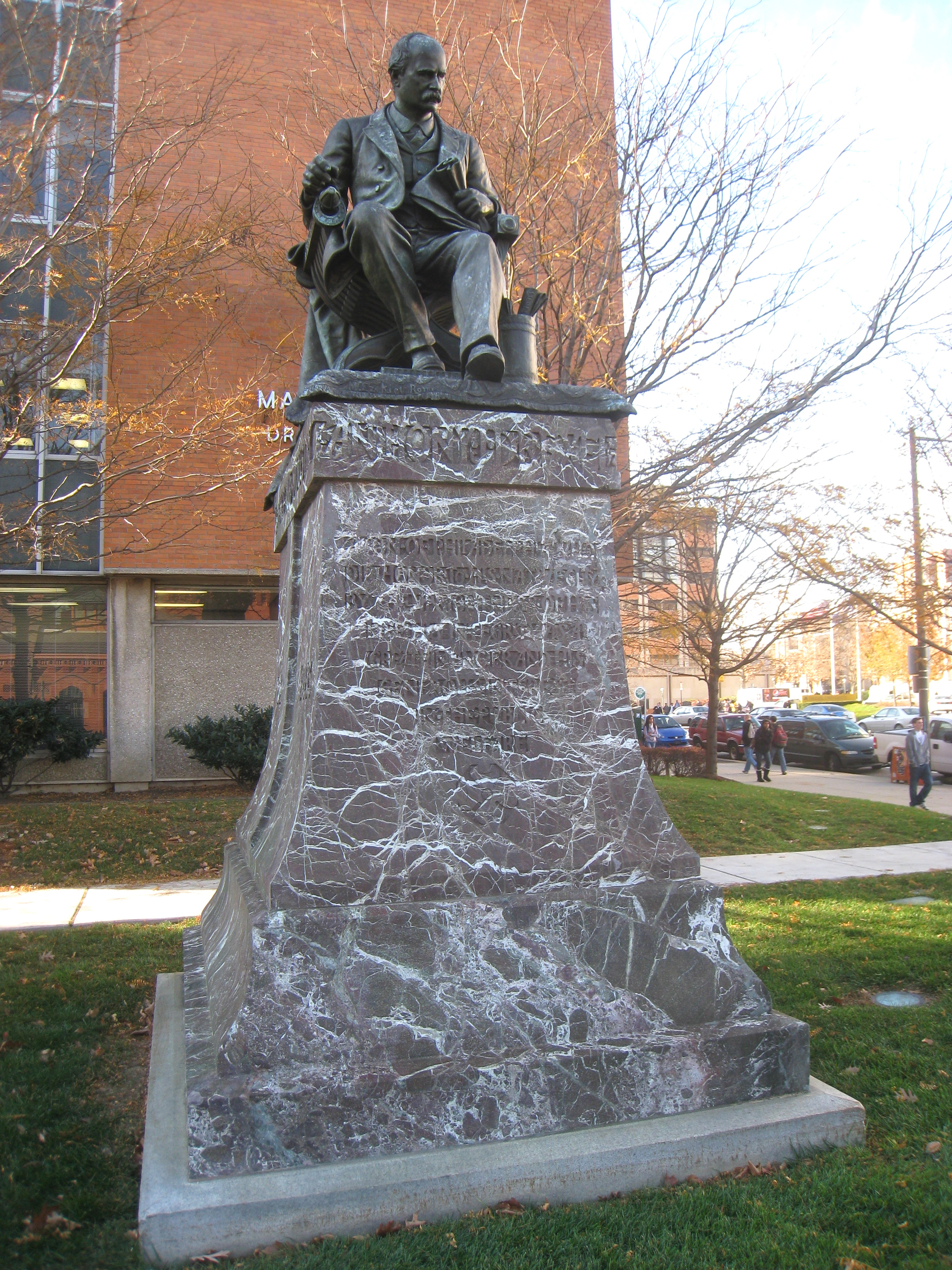
Statue of Anthony J. Drexel by Moses J. Ezekiel, which was completed in 1904 and moved to the Drexel campus in 1966

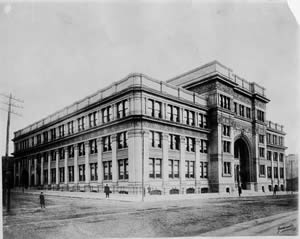
The Main Building, dedicated in 1891

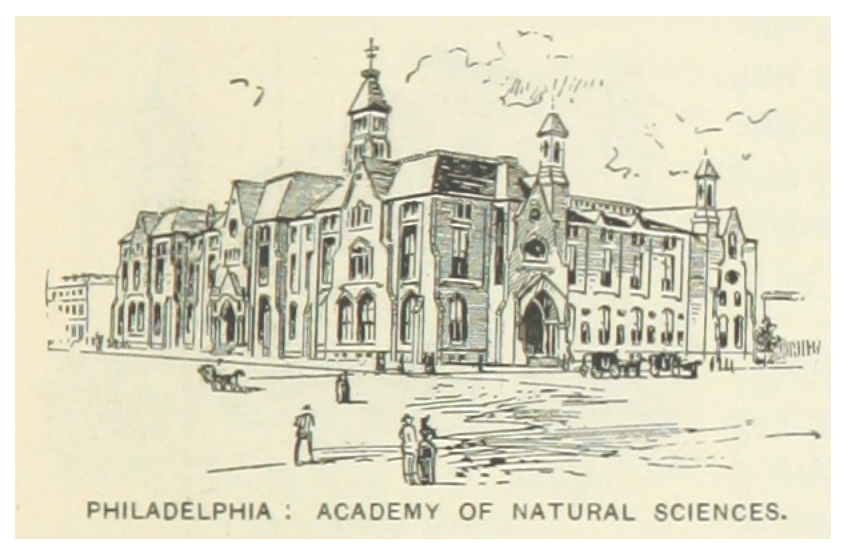
Academy of Natural Sciences (in structure built in 1876) as it appeared in 1891 in its present location but a prior edifice

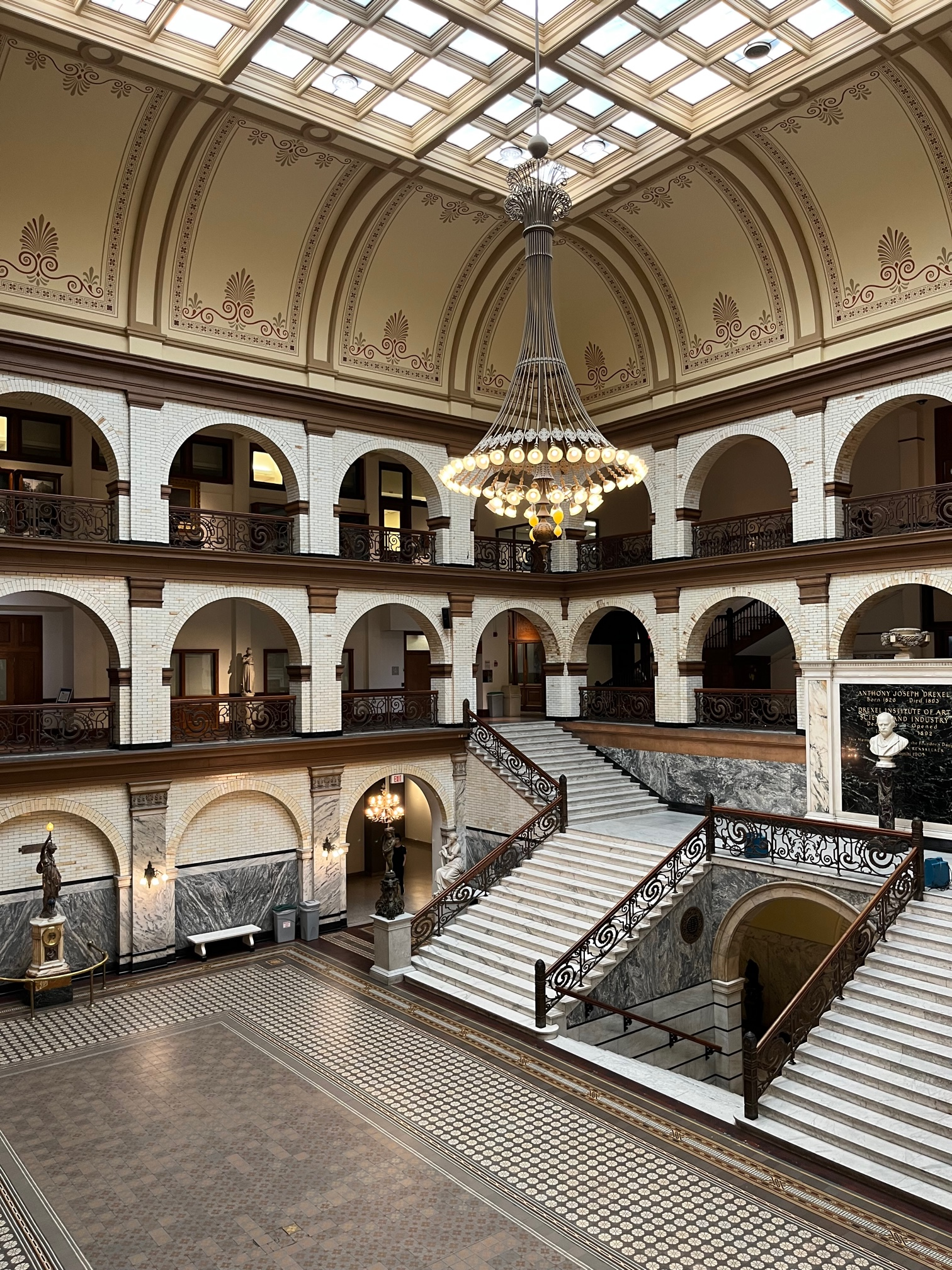
The interior of Drexel University's Main Building as seen in 2023

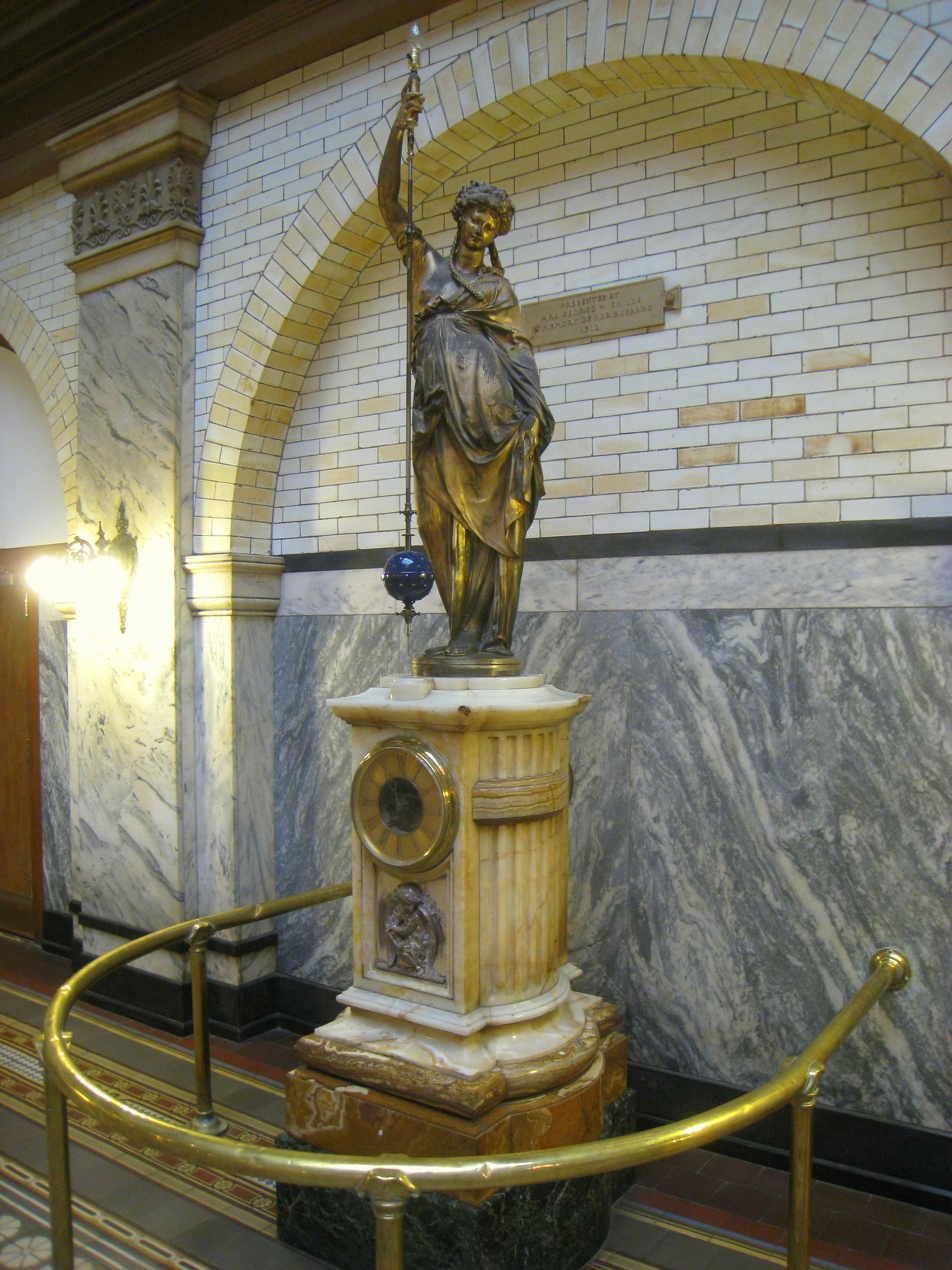
Monumental conical pendulum clock by Eugène Farcot and sculpture by Albert-Ernest Carrier-Belleuse, which was donated to the university in 1912

Drexel University was founded in 1891 as the Drexel Institute of Art, Science and Industry by Anthony J. Drexel, a Philadelphia financier and philanthropist. The original mission of the institution was to provide educational opportunities in the "practical arts and sciences" for women and men of all backgrounds.

Drexel can now trace its roots to 1812 as in 2011 Drexel took over the management of what is now named Academy of Natural Sciences of Drexel University which Academy was formed in the winter of 1812. In April 1817, the legislature of Commonwealth of Pennsylvania incorporated the organization under the name "Academy of Natural Sciences of Philadelphia".

=== 20th century ===
In 1936, the institution was renamed as the Drexel Institute of Technology. It eventually gained university status and was finally named Drexel University in 1970.

Despite changes during its first century, the university has remained a privately controlled, non-sectarian, coeducational center of higher learning committed to practical education and hands-on experience in an occupational setting. The central aspect of Drexel University's focus on career preparation, in the form of its cooperative education program, was introduced in 1919. Participating students alternate periods of classroom-based study with periods of full-time, practical work experience related to one's academic major and career interests.

Between 1995 and 2009, Drexel University underwent a period of significant change to its programs, enrollment, and facilities under the leadership of Dr. Constantine Papadakis, the university's president during that time. Papadakis oversaw Drexel's largest expansion in its history, with a 471 percent increase in its endowment and a 102 percent increase in student enrollment. He oversaw improved performance in collegiate rankings, the implementation of a more selective approach to admissions, and a more rigorous academic program at all levels. In 2007, Drexel was the host of the 2008 Democratic presidential candidate debate in Philadelphia, televised by MSNBC.

=== 21st century ===
In 2002, Drexel University acquired and assumed management of the former Medical College of Pennsylvania (MCP) Hahnemann University, creating the Drexel University College of Medicine. In 2006, the university established the Thomas R. Kline School of Law, and in 2011 the School of Law achieved full accreditation by the American Bar Association.

Constantine Papadakis died of pneumonia in April 2009 while still employed as the university's president. His successor, John Anderson Fry, was previously the president of Franklin & Marshall College and executive vice president of the University of Pennsylvania.

Under Fry's leadership, Drexel has continued its expansion, including the July 2011 acquisition of The Academy of Natural Sciences. In 2024, Drexel acquired Salus University, which has multiple programs in health related fields. The merger was completed on July 3, 2025.

Fry announced his resignation in July 2024 to become President of Temple University upon the death of acting President JoAnne Epps. Denis O'Brien was appointed as interim president until Fry's successor, Antonio Merlo, assumed the presidency on July 1, 2025.

On September 1, 2026, it was announced that their 200 year old Academy of Natural Sciences of Drexel University on would close its doors that same month, on September 30, with the museum's last day open to the public with regular hours being the 27th. Founded in 1812, it is the oldest museum of the Americas and the Academy’s collections include over 19 million biological specimens, fossils, archives and other scientific resources. The backlash was instant, causing local and national groups to protest and rally to maintain the museum's doors open. The Academy also announced that Scott Cooper had stepped down as their president and CEO.

== Academics ==
=== Undergraduate admissions ===
In 2024, Drexel University accepted 77.5% of undergraduate applicants, the 47th highest acceptance rate of Pennsylvania schools, with applicant competition considered very low. Those enrolled had an average 3.67 high school GPA. The university does not require submission of standardized test scores, but they will be considered when submitted. Those enrolled who submitted test scores had an average 1330 SAT score (38% submitting scores) or an average 30 ACT score (6% submitting scores).

=== Schools and colleges ===
==== College of Arts and Sciences ====
The College of Arts and Sciences was formed in 1990 when Drexel merged the two existing College of Sciences and College of Humanities together.

==== Antoinette Westphal College of Media Arts and Design ====
The College of Media Arts and Design "fosters the study, exploration and management of the arts: media, design, the performing and visual". The college offers 18 undergraduate programs and nine graduate programs, in modern art and design fields that range from architecture, graphic design and dance to fashion design and television management. Its wide range of programs has helped the college earn full accreditation from the National Association of Schools of Art and Design, the National Architectural Accrediting Board, and the Council for Interior Design Accreditation.

==== Bennett S. LeBow College of Business ====
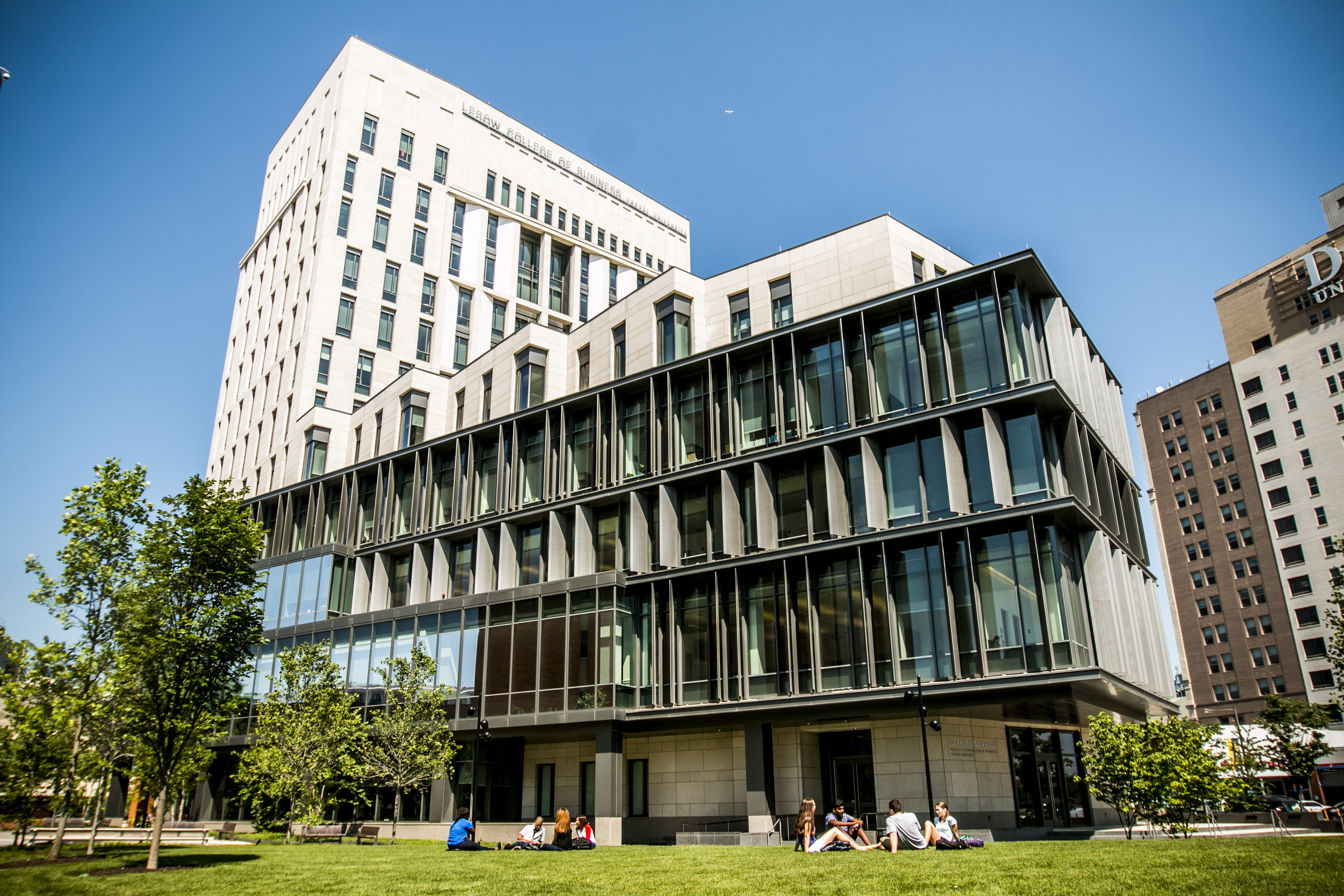
Gerri C. Lebow Hall, home of the Bennett S. LeBow College of Business

The Bennett S. LeBow College of Business history dates to the founding in 1891 of the Drexel Institute, that later became Drexel University, and of its Business Department in 1896. Today LeBow offers thirteen undergraduate majors, eight graduate programs, and two doctoral programs; 22 percent of Drexel University's undergraduate students are enrolled in a LeBow College of Business program.

The LeBow College of Business has been ranked as the 38th best private business school in the nation. Its online MBA program is ranked 14th in the world by the Financial Times; the publication also ranks the undergraduate business program at LeBow as 19th in the United States. The part-time MBA program ranks 1st in academic quality in the 2015 edition of Business Insider's rankings. Undergraduate and graduate entrepreneurship programs are ranked 19th in the country by the Princeton Review.

==== School of Economics ====
Economics programs at the LeBow College of Business are housed within the School of Economics. In addition to the undergraduate program in economics, the school is home to an M.S. in Economics program as well as a PhD program in economics. Faculty members in the School of Economics have been published in the American Economic Review, RAND Journal of Economics, and Review of Economics and Statistics. The school has been ranked among the best in the world for its extensive research into matters of international trade.

==== College of Engineering ====
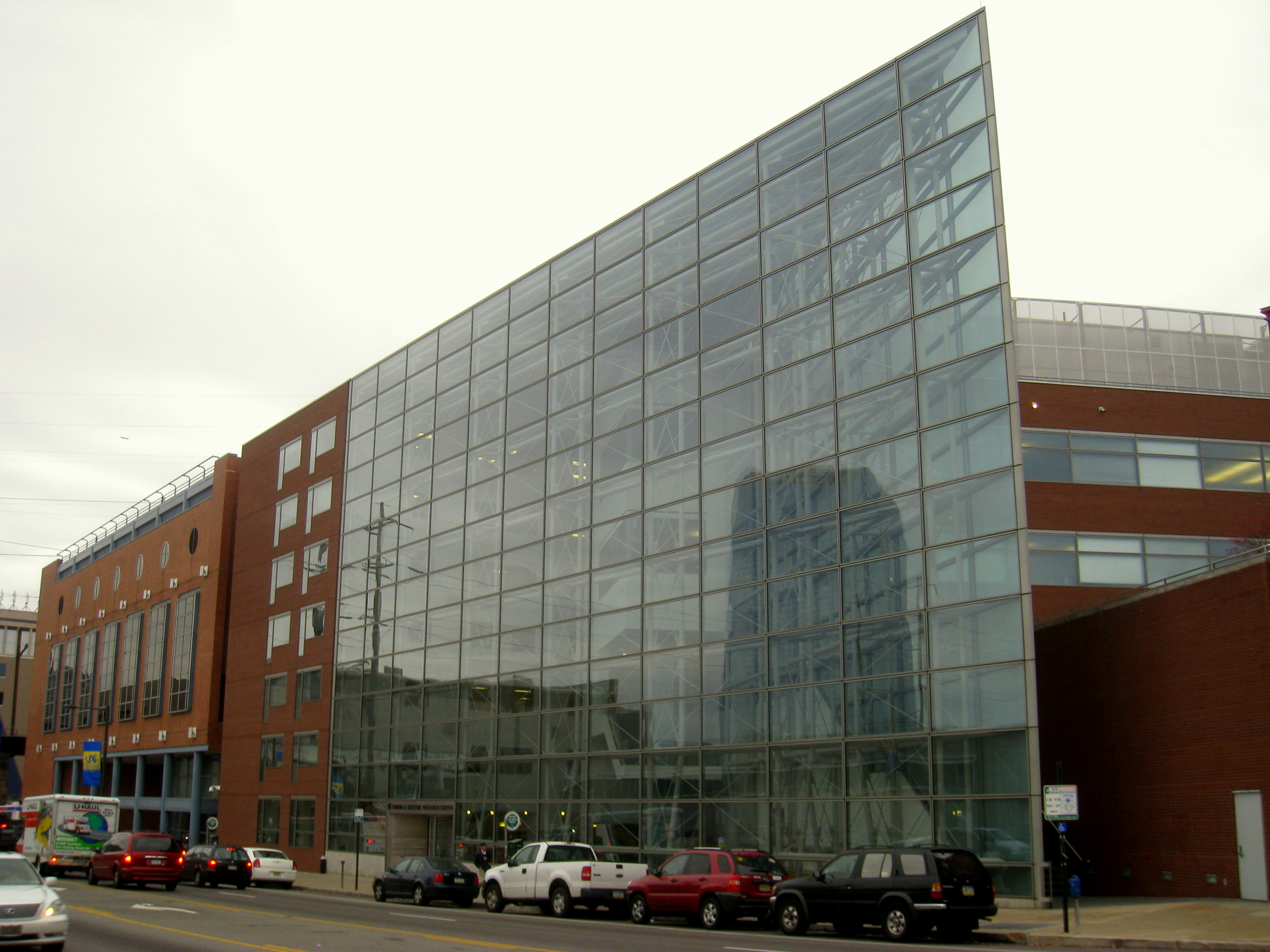
Edmund D. Bossone Research Center, located on the Avenue of Technology on Market Street

Drexel's College of Engineering is one of its oldest and largest academic colleges and served as the original focus of the career-oriented school upon its founding in 1891. The College of Engineering is home to several notable alumni, including two astronauts; financier Bennett S. LeBow, for whom the university's College of Business is named; and Paul Baran, inventor of the packet-switched network. Today, Drexel University's College of Engineering, which is home to 19 percent of the undergraduate student body, is known for creating the world's first engineering degree in appropriate technology. The college is also one of only 17 U.S. universities to offer a bachelor's degree in architectural engineering, and only one of five private institutions to do so.

===== Drexel Engineering Curriculum (tDEC) =====
The engineering curriculum used by the school was originally called E4 (Enhanced Educational Experience for Engineers) which was established in 1986 and funded in part by the Engineering Directorate of the National Science Foundation.

In 1988, the program evolved into tDEC (the Drexel Engineering Curriculum) which is composed of two full years of rigorous core engineering courses which encompass the freshman and sophomore years of the engineering student. The College of Engineering hasn't used the tDEC curriculum since approximately 2005.

==== College of Computing and Informatics ====
The College of Computing and Informatics is a recent addition to Drexel University, though its programs have been offered to students for many years. The college was formed by the consolidation of the former College of Information Science & Technology (often called the "iSchool"), the Department of Computer Science, and the Computing and Security Technology program. Undergraduate and graduate programs in computer science, software engineering, data science, information systems, and computer security are offered by the college.

==== College of Medicine ====
The Drexel University College of Medicine was added to the colleges and schools of the university in 2002, having been formed upon the acquisition of MCP Hahnemann University. In addition to its M.D. program, the College of Medicine offers more than 40 graduate programs in its Graduate School of Biomedical Sciences and Professional Studies.

===== Graduate School of Biomedical Sciences and Professional Studies =====
The Graduate School of Biomedical Sciences and Professional studies offers both Master of Science and Doctor of Philosophy degree programs in fields like biochemistry, biotechnology, clinical research, and forensic science. The school also serves as the center for biomedical research at Drexel University.

==== School of Biomedical Engineering, Science and Health Systems ====
Founded in 1961 as the United States' first Biomedical Engineering and Science Institute, the School of Biomedical Engineering, Science and Health Systems focuses on the emerging field of biomedical science at the undergraduate, graduate, and doctoral levels. Primary research areas within the school include bioinformatics, biomechanics, biomaterials, neuroengineering, and cardiovascular engineering.

==== College of Nursing and Health Professions ====
Formed in 2002 along with the College of Medicine, Drexel's College of Nursing and Health Professions offers more than 25 programs to undergraduate and graduate students in the fields of nursing, nutrition, health sciences, health services, and radiologic technology. The college's research into matters of nutrition and rehabilitation have garnered approximately $2.9 million in external research funding on an annual basis. The physician assistant program at Drexel's College of Nursing and Health Professions is ranked in the top 15 such programs in the United States; its anesthesia programs and physical therapy programs are, respectively, ranked as top-50 programs nationwide.

==== Richard C. Goodwin College of Professional Studies ====
Established in 1892, the department now known as the College of Professional Studies has focused exclusively on educational programs and pursuits for nontraditional adult learners. Today, the Goodwin College of Professional Studies offers several options designed for adult learners at all stages of career and educational development. Bachelor of Science degree completion programs are offered in part-time evening or weekend formats; graduate programs and doctoral programs are offered at the graduate level, as are self-paced "continuing education" courses and nearly a dozen self-paced certification programs.

==== Pennoni Honors College ====
The Pennoni Honors College, named for Drexel alumnus and trustee Dr. C.R. "Chuck" Pennoni B.S. '63, M.S. '66, H.D. '92, and his wife Annette, was founded as the Honors Program in 1991 and developed into a College in 2003. Students admitted to the Honors College live together and take many of the same classes; the college provides these students with access to unique cultural and social activities and a unique guest speaker series. Students are also involved in the university's Honors Student Advisory Committee and have the opportunity to take part in Drexel's "Alternative Spring Break", an international study tour held each spring.

==== Thomas R. Kline School of Law ====
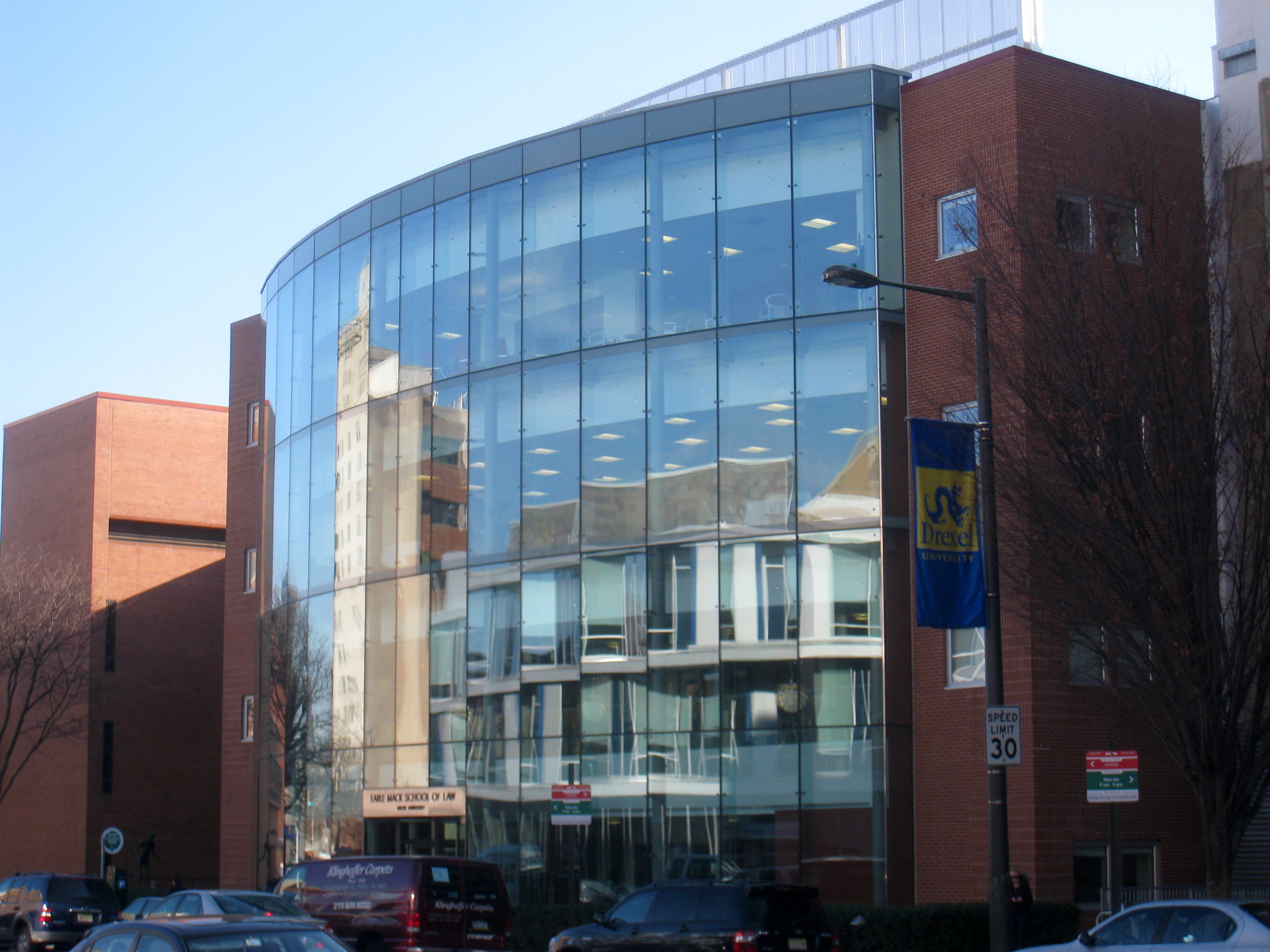
Thomas R. Kline School of Law

Upon its founding in 2006, the Thomas R. Kline School of Law, originally known as the Earle Mack School of Law, was the first law school founded in Philadelphia in more than three decades. The School of Law offers L.L.M. and Master of Legal Studies degrees, in addition to the flagship Juris Doctor program, and uniquely offers cooperative education as part of its curriculum across all programs. In 2015, Bloomberg Business ranked the Kline School of Law as the second most underrated law school in the United States.

==== School of Education ====
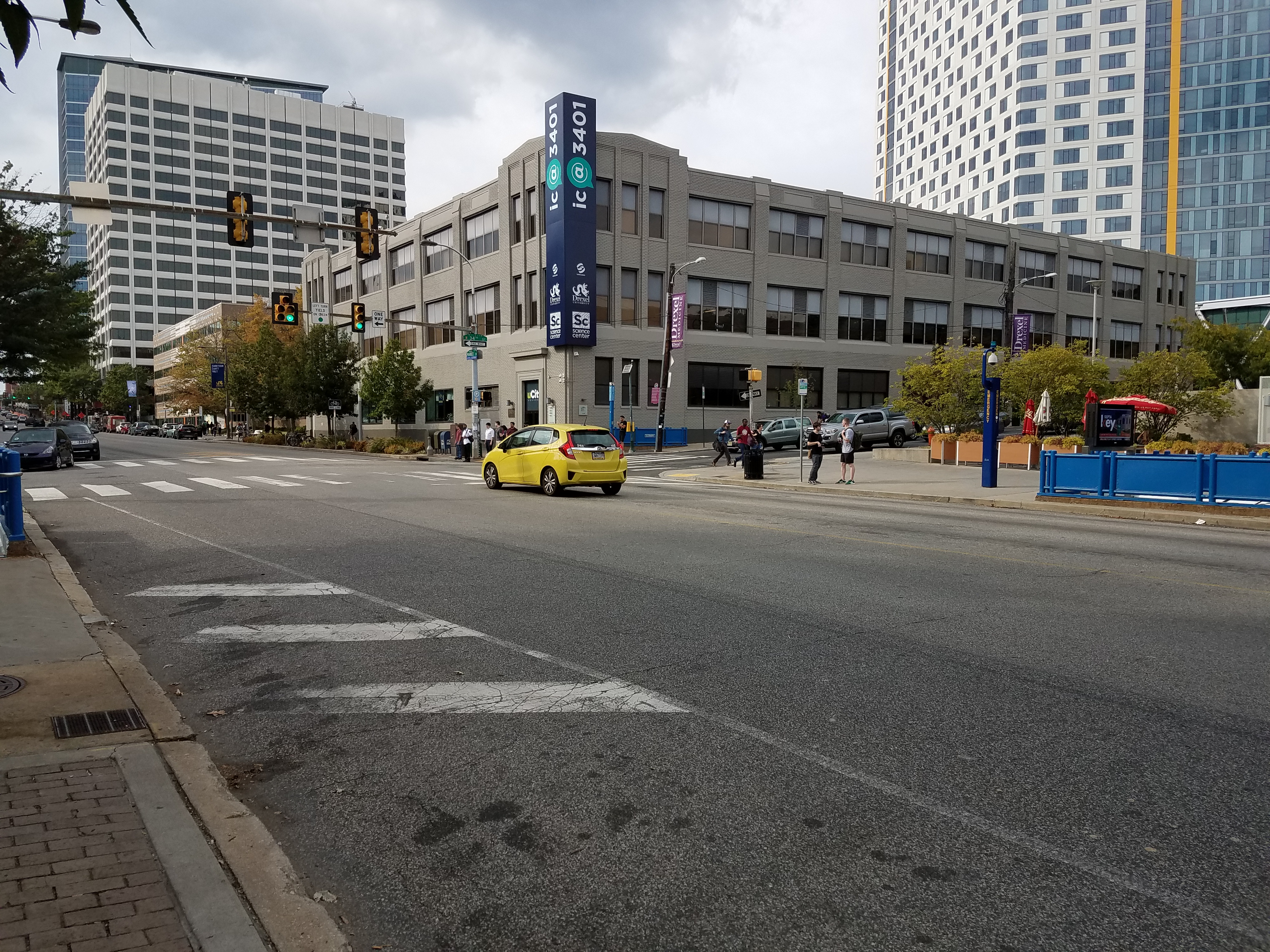
Drexel University's School of Education offices on the third floor of the UCity Square building at 3401 Market Street

One of the oldest schools within Drexel University, the modern School of Education dates back to the 1891 founding of the school. Originally, the Department of Education offered teacher training to women as one of its original, career-focused degree programs. Today, the School of Education offers a coeducational approach to teacher training at the elementary and secondary levels for undergraduates. Other undergraduate programs include those focused on the intersection between learning and technology, teacher certification for non-education majors, and a minor in education for students with an interest in instruction. Graduate degrees offered by the School of Education include those in administration and leadership, special education, higher education, mathematics education, international education, and educational creativity and innovation. Doctoral degrees are offered in educational leadership and learning technologies.

==== Dornsife School of Public Health ====
The School of Public Health states that its mission is to "provide education, conduct research, and partner with communities and organizations to improve the health of populations". To that end, the school offers both a B.S. and a minor in public health for undergraduate students as well as several options for students pursuing graduate and doctoral degrees in the field. At the graduate level, the Dornsife School offers both a Master of Public Health and an Executive Master of Public Health, as well as an M.S. in biostatistics and an M.S. in epidemiology. Two Doctor of Public Health degrees are also offered, as is a Doctor of Philosophy in epidemiology. The school's graduate and doctoral students are heavily invested in the research activities of the Dornsife School of Public Health, which has helped the school attract annual funding for its four research centers.

==== Center for Hospitality and Sport Management ====
The Center for Hospitality and Sport Management was formed in 2013, in an effort to house and consolidate academic programs in hospitality, tourism management, the culinary arts, and sport management. Academic programs combine the unique skills required of the sports and hospitality industries with the principles and curriculum espoused by the management programs within Drexel's LeBow College of Business.

==== Charles D. Close School of Entrepreneurship ====
Focusing specifically on the skills required to successfully start and launch a business, The Charles D. Close School of Entrepreneurship is the first and only freestanding school of entrepreneurship in the United States. Undergraduate students take part in a B.A. program in entrepreneurship and innovation, while graduate students a combined Master of Science degree in biomedicine and entrepreneurship. Minors in entrepreneurship are also offered to undergraduate students.

===== Laurence A. Baiada Institute for Entrepreneurship =====
Housed within the Close School is the Baiada Institute for Entrepreneurship. The institute serves as an incubator for Drexel student startups, providing resources and mentorships to students and some post-graduates who are starting their own business while enrolled in one of the Close School's degree programs or academic minors.

=== Online education ===
Drexel University launched its first Internet-based education program, a master's degree in Library & Information Science, in 1996. In 2001, Drexel created its wholly owned, for-profit online education subsidiary, Drexel e-Learning, Inc., better known as Drexel University Online. It was announced in October 2013 that Drexel University Online would no longer be a for-profit venture, but rather become an internal division within the university to better serve its online student population. Although headquartered in Philadelphia, Drexel announced a new Washington, D.C., location in December 2012 to serve as both an academic and outreach center, catering to the online student population.

Drexel University Online founded the National Distance Learning Week, in conjunction with the United States Distance Learning Association, in 2007. In September 2010, Drexel University Online received the Sloan-C award for institution-wide excellence in online education indicating that it had exceptional programs of "demonstrably high quality" at the regional and national levels and across disciplines. Drexel University Online won the 2008 United States Distance Learning Association's Best Practices Awards for Distance Learning Programming. In 2007, the online education subsidiary had a revenue of $40 million. In March 2013, Drexel Online had more than 7,000 unique students from all 50 states and more than 20 countries pursuing a bachelor's, master's, or certificate. As of December 2013, Drexel University Online offers more than 100 fully accredited master's degrees, bachelor's degrees and certificate programs.

=== Cooperative education program ===
Drexel's longstanding cooperative education, or "co-op" program is one of the largest and oldest in the United States. Drexel has a fully internet-based job database, where students can submit résumés and request interviews with any of the thousands of companies that offer positions. Students also have the option of obtaining a co-op via independent search. A student graduating from Drexel's 5-year degree program typically has a total of 18 months of co-op with up to three different companies. The majority of co-ops are paid, averaging $18,720 per 6-month period, however this figure changes with major. About one-third of Drexel graduates are offered full-time positions by their co-op employers right after graduation.

=== Research activity ===
Drexel is classified among "R1: Doctoral Universities – Very High Research Activity". The university was ranked 51st in the 2018 edition of the "Top 100 Worldwide Universities Granted U.S. Utility Patents" list released by the National Academy of Inventors and the Intellectual Property Owners Association.

=== Rankings ===
Academic rankings

National
- Forbes: 185
- U.S. News & World Report: 80 (tie)
- Washington Monthly: 143
- WSJ/College Pulse: 54

Global
- ARWU: 501–600
- QS: 711–720
- THE: 401–500
- U.S. News & World Report: 493

USNWR 2025 graduate school rankings
Education	125
Engineering	74
Law	79
Medicine: Primary Care	Tier 3
Medicine: Research	Tier 2
Nursing: Master's	N/A

USNWR 2025 departmental rankings
Biological Sciences	158
Chemistry	119
Clinical Psychology	91
Computer Science	88
Library & Information Studies	13
Mathematics	99
Nursing-Anesthesia	51
Physical Therapy	46
Physician Assistant	35
Physics	95
Psychology	81
Public Affairs	129
Public Health	27

In its 2026 rankings, U.S. News & World Report ranked Drexel tied for 80th among national universities in the United States, tied for 42nd in the "Most Innovative Schools" category, 76th in "Best Value Schools", tied for 50th in "Best Colleges for Veterans", and tied for 74th in "Top Performers on Social Mobility.

In 2024, Washington Monthly ranked Drexel 143rd among 438 national universities in the U.S. based on Drexel's contribution to the public good, as measured by social mobility, research, and promoting public service.

== Campuses ==
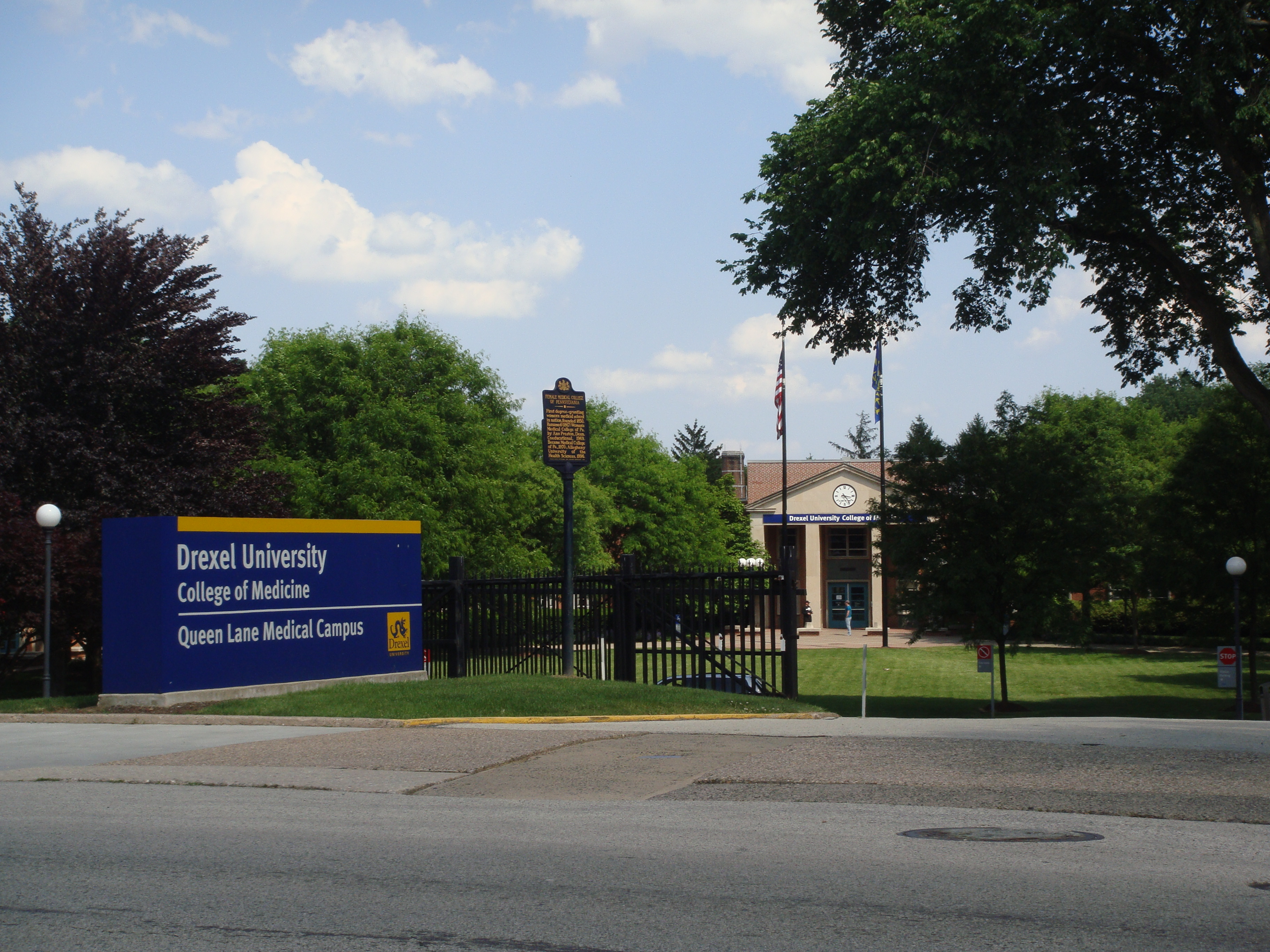
The Queen Lane College of Medicine Campus

Drexel University's programs are divided across three Philadelphia-area campuses: the University City Campus, the Center City Campus and the Queen Lane College of Medicine Campus.

=== University City Main Campus ===
The 77-acre (31 ha) University City Main Campus of Drexel University is located just west of the Schuylkill River in the University City district of Philadelphia. It is Drexel's largest and oldest campus; the campus contains the university's administrative offices and serves as the main academic center for students. The northern, residential portion of the main campus is located in the Powelton Village section of West Philadelphia. The two prominent performing stages at Drexel University are the Mandell Theater and the Main Auditorium. The Main Auditorium dates back to the founding of Drexel and construction of its main hall. It features over 1000 seats, and a pipe organ installed in 1928. The organ was purchased by Saturday Evening Post publisher Cyrus H. K. Curtis after he had donated a similar organ, the Curtis Organ, to nearby University of Pennsylvania and it was suggested that he do the same for Drexel. The 424-seat Mandell Theater was built in 1973 and features a more performance-oriented stage, including a full fly system, modern stage lighting facilities, stadium seating, and accommodations for wheelchairs. It is used for the semiannual spring musical, as well as various plays and many events.

=== Queen Lane Campus ===
The Queen Lane Campus was purchased by Drexel University as part of its acquisition of MCP Hahnemann University. It is located in the East Falls neighborhood of northwest Philadelphia and is primarily utilized by first- and second-year medical students, and researchers. A free shuttle is available, connecting the Queen Lane Campus to the Center City Hahnemann and University City Main campuses.

=== Center City Campus ===
The Center City Campus is in the middle of Philadelphia, straddling the Vine Street Expressway between Broad and 15th Streets. Shuttle service is offered between the Center City Campus and both the University City and Queen Lane campuses of the university.

=== Academy of Natural Sciences ===
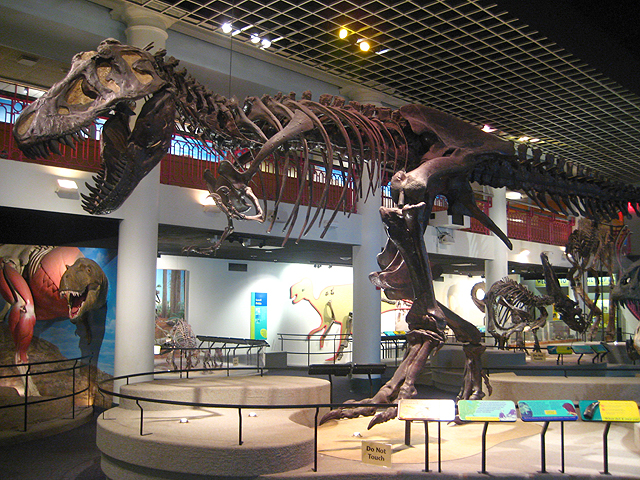
A complete Tyrannosaurus rex fossil on display with other dinosaur specimens at the Academy of Natural Sciences

In 2011, The Academy of Natural Sciences entered into an agreement to become a subsidiary of Drexel University. Founded in 1812, the Academy of Natural Sciences is America's oldest natural history museum and is a world leader in biodiversity and environmental research.

=== Drexel University Sacramento ===
On January 5, 2009, Drexel University opened the Center for Graduate Studies in Sacramento, California. Eventually renamed Drexel University Sacramento upon the addition of an undergraduate program in business administration, the campus also offered an Ed.D. program in Educational Leadership and Management and master's degree programs in Business Administration, Finance, Higher Education, Human Resource Development, Public Health, and Interdepartmental Medical Science. On March 5, 2015, Drexel University announced the closure of the Sacramento campus, with an 18-month "phase out" period designed to allow current students to complete their degrees.

== Student life ==
=== Graduate Students Association ===
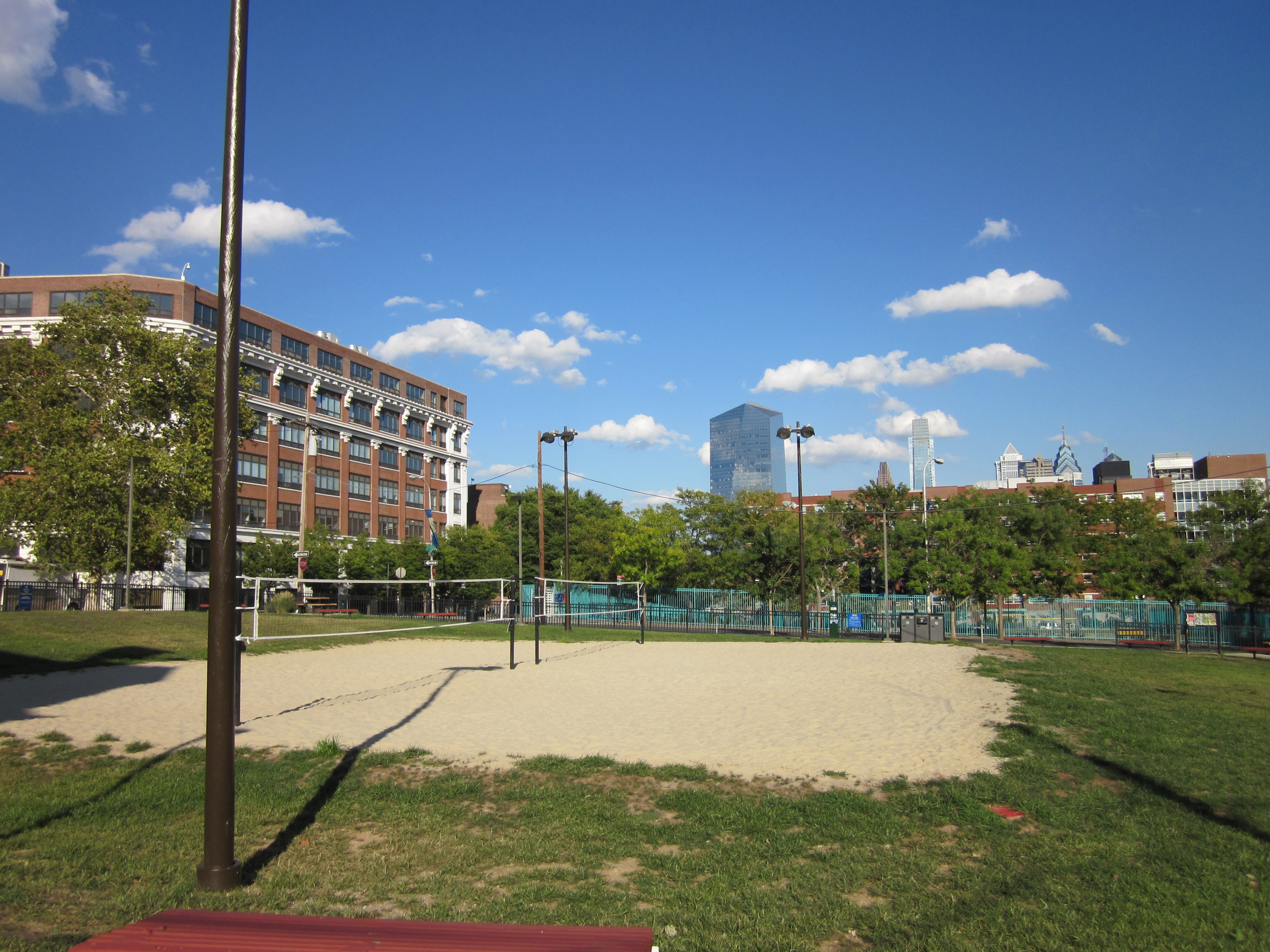
Buckley Volleyball Courts on 33rd and Arch Streets

The Graduate Student Association "advocates the interests and addresses concerns of graduate students at Drexel; strives to enhance graduate student life at the University in all aspects, from academic to campus security; and provides a formal means of communication between graduate students and the University community".

=== Jewish life on campus ===
Drexel has an approximate Jewish population of 5% and has both a Chabad House and a Hillel. Both provide services to Jewish and non-Jewish students at Drexel. Due to an increase in the number of Orthodox Jewish students, the Hillel offers hot kosher food Monday through Thursday. There is also an eruv which is jointly managed by Jewish students from Drexel and the University of Pennsylvania.

=== Television ===
DUTV is Drexel's Philadelphia cable television station. The student operated station is part of the Paul F. Harron Studios at Drexel University. The purpose of DUTV is to provide "the people of Philadelphia with quality educational television, and providing Drexel students the opportunity to gain experience in television management and production". The Programing includes an eclectic variety of shows from a bi-monthly news show, DNews, to old films, talk shows dealing with important current issues and music appreciation shows. Over 75 percent of DUTV's programming is student produced.

=== Publications ===
The Triangle has been the university's newspaper since 1926 and currently publishes on a biweekly basis every Friday of the academic term. The Triangle has won several Mark of Excellence Awards which honor the best in Student Journalism from the Society of Professional Journalists. First place in Editorial Writing (2000), General Column Writing (2000), Second place in Editorial Writing (2001), and third place in Sports Column Writing (2001). In 2004, it won two National Pacemaker Awards for excellence in college newspapers. In December 2019 The Triangle announced the creation of their podcasting division, "Tri-Pod", which debuted on January 10, 2020. Tri-Pod had two podcasts, "Last Call". and "Mark and Jair Explain Sports".

The school yearbook was first published in 1911 and named the Lexerd in 1913. Prior to the publishing of a campus-wide yearbook in 1911 The Hanseatic and The Eccentric were both published in 1896 as class books.

=== Housing ===
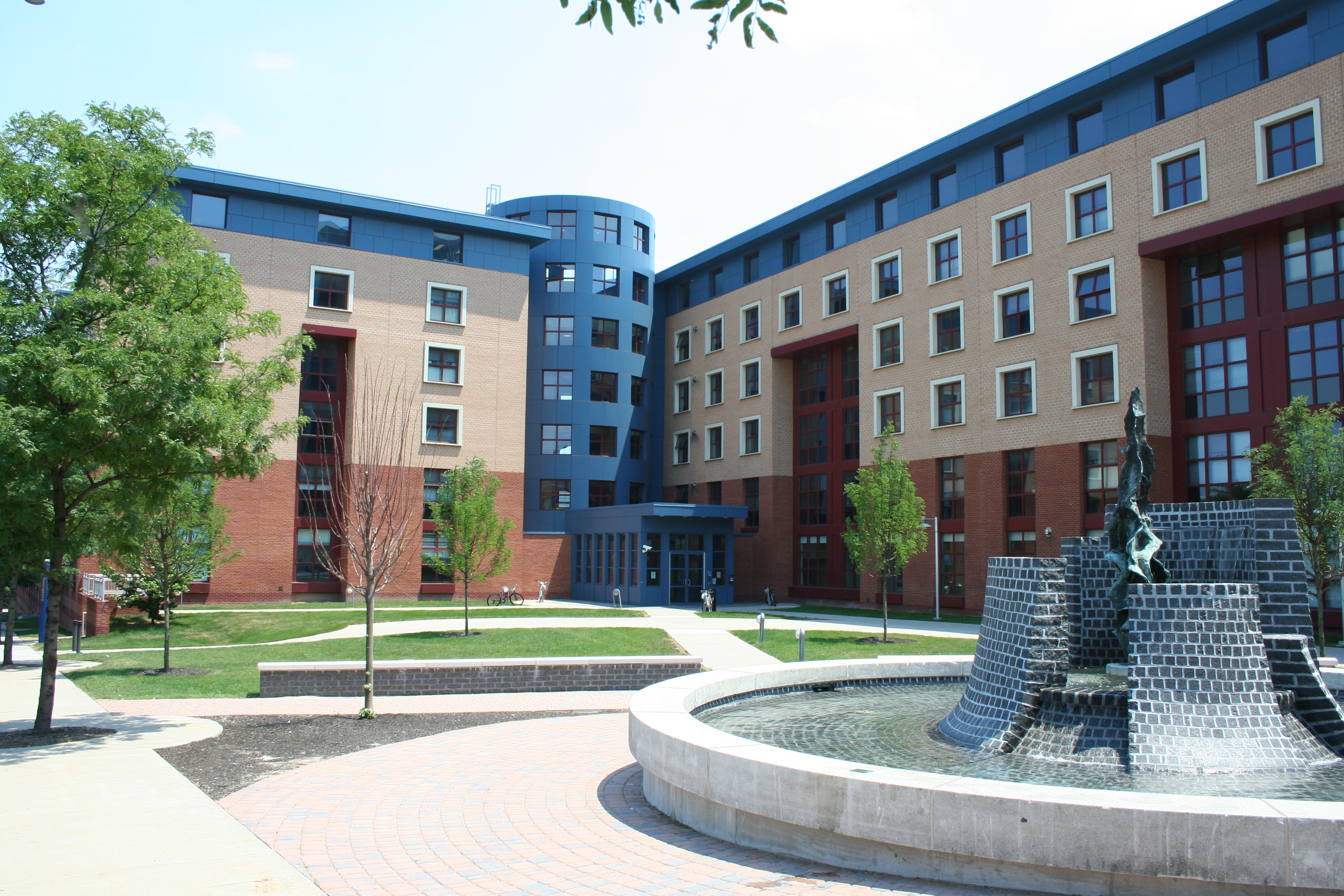
North Hall by architect Michael Graves

Drexel requires all non-commuting first- and second-year students to live in one of its ten residence halls or in "university approved housing".

Second-year students have the option of living in a residence hall designated for upperclassmen, or "university approved housing". The residence halls for upperclassmen are North and Caneris Halls. North Hall operates under the For Students By Students Residential Experience Engagement Model, developed by the Residential Living Office. There are many apartments that are university approved that second-year students can choose to live in. Three of the largest apartment buildings that fit this description are Chestnut Square, University Crossings, and The Summit, all owned by American Campus Communities. Many other students live in smaller apartment buildings or individual townhouse-style apartments in Powelton Village. A second-year student can choose one of the already listed university approved housing options or petition the university to add a new property to the approved list.

=== Student organizations ===
Drexel University recognizes over 250 student organizations in the following categories:

- Academic
- Club Sports
- Community Service/Social Action
- Cultural
- Fraternity & Sorority Life
- General Interest
- Honorary
- Media
- Performing and Fine Arts
- Political
- Spiritual & Religious

=== Fraternities and sororities ===
Approximately 12 percent of Drexel's undergraduate population are members of a social fraternities and sororities. There are currently fourteen Interfraternity Council (IFC) chapters, seven Panhellenic Council (PHC) chapters and thirteen Multi-cultural Greek Council (MGC) chapters. Alpha Pi Lambda was established at Drexel in 1935.

== Athletics ==
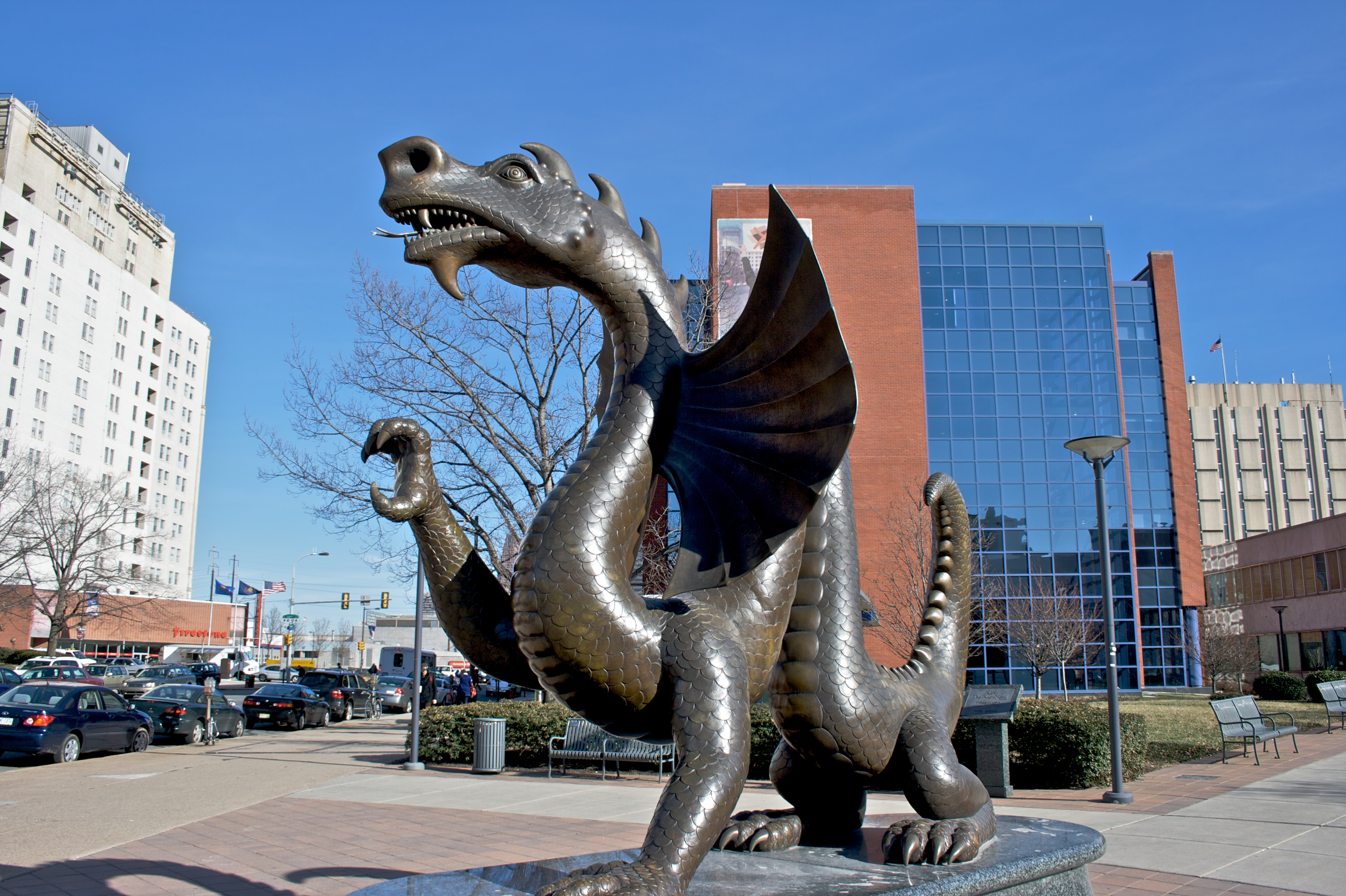
Mario the Magnificent, mascot of Drexel, by Eric Berg

Drexel Dragons wordmark

Drexel's school mascot is a dragon known as "Mario the Magnificent", named in honor of alumnus and Board of Trustees member Mario V. Mascioli after he attended every Drexel basketball for over 20 years. The Dragon has been the mascot of the school since around the mid-1920s; the first written reference to the Dragons occurred in 1928, when the football team was called "The Dragons in The Triangle". Before becoming known as the Dragons, the athletic teams had been known by such names as the Blue & Gold, the Engineers, and the Drexelites. The school's sports teams, now known as the Drexel Dragons, participate in the NCAA's Division I as a member of the Coastal Athletic Association. They do not currently field a varsity football team.

In addition to its NCAA Division I teams, Drexel University is home to 33 active club teams including men's ice hockey, lacrosse, water polo, squash, triathlon, and cycling. Other club teams include soccer, baseball, rugby, field hockey, and roller hockey. The club teams operate under the direction of the Club Sports Council and the Recreational Sports Office.

== Alumni ==
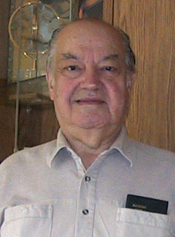
Paul Baran, engineer, inventor of packet switching

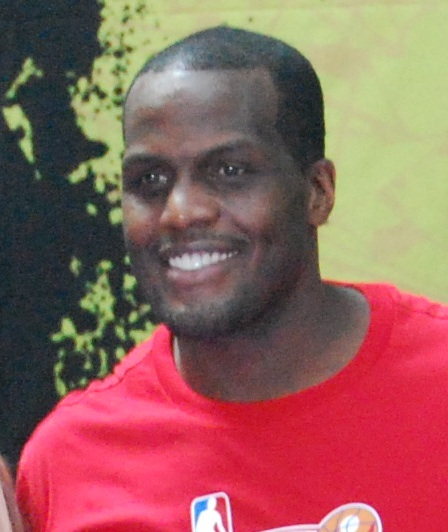
Malik Rose, former NBA player

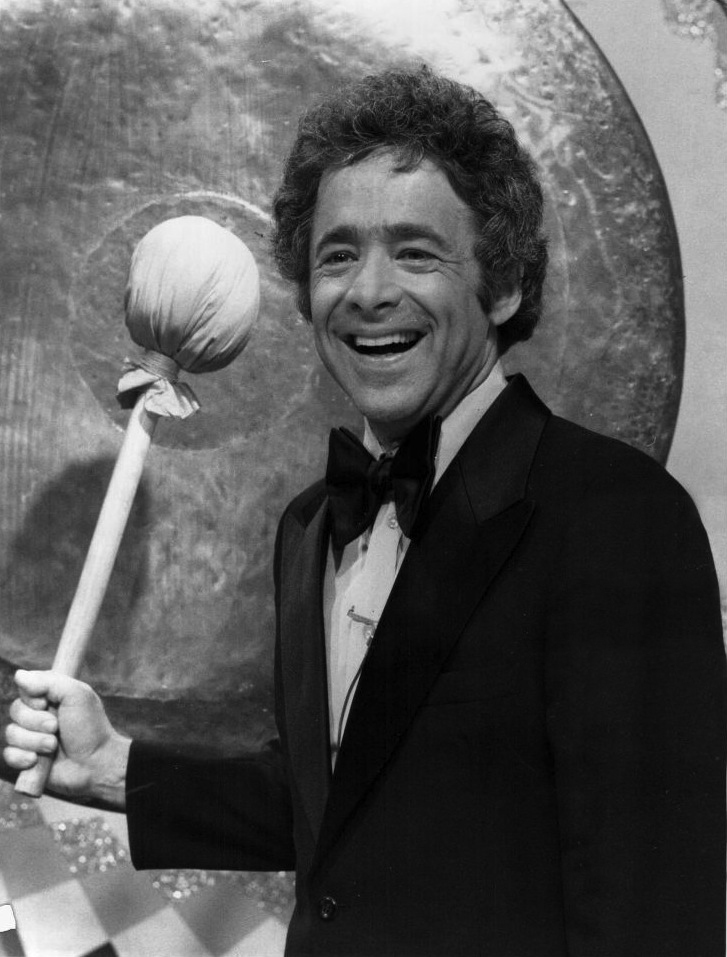
Chuck Barris, game show host

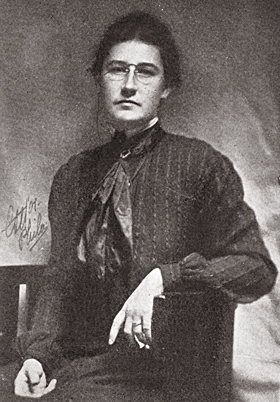
Jessie Willcox Smith, illustrator

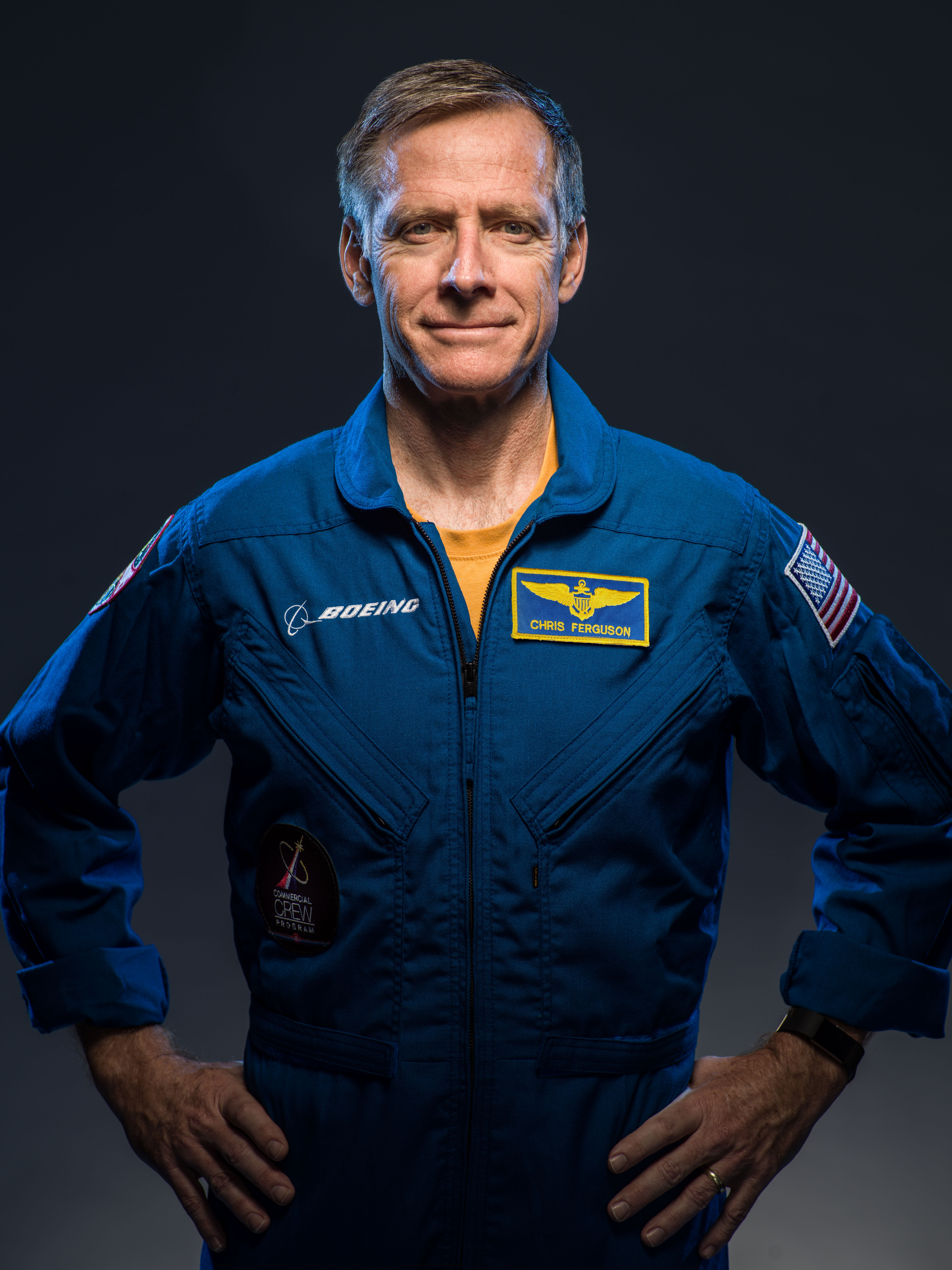
Christopher Ferguson, retired NASA astronaut

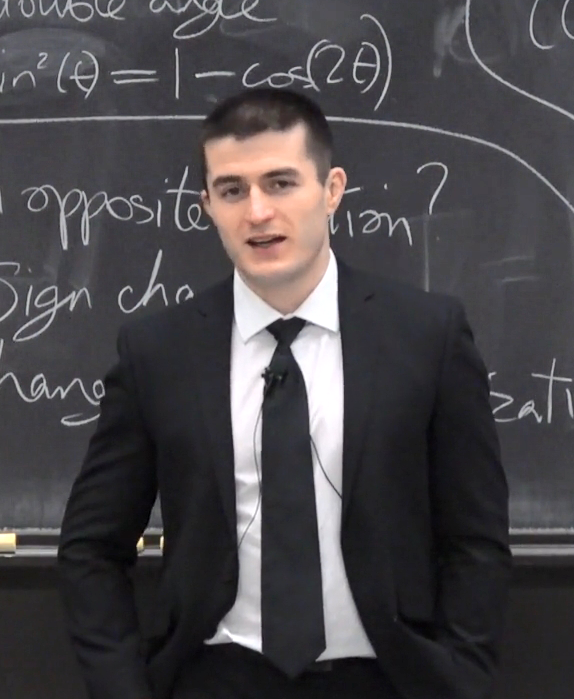
Lex Fridman, computer scientist and podcaster

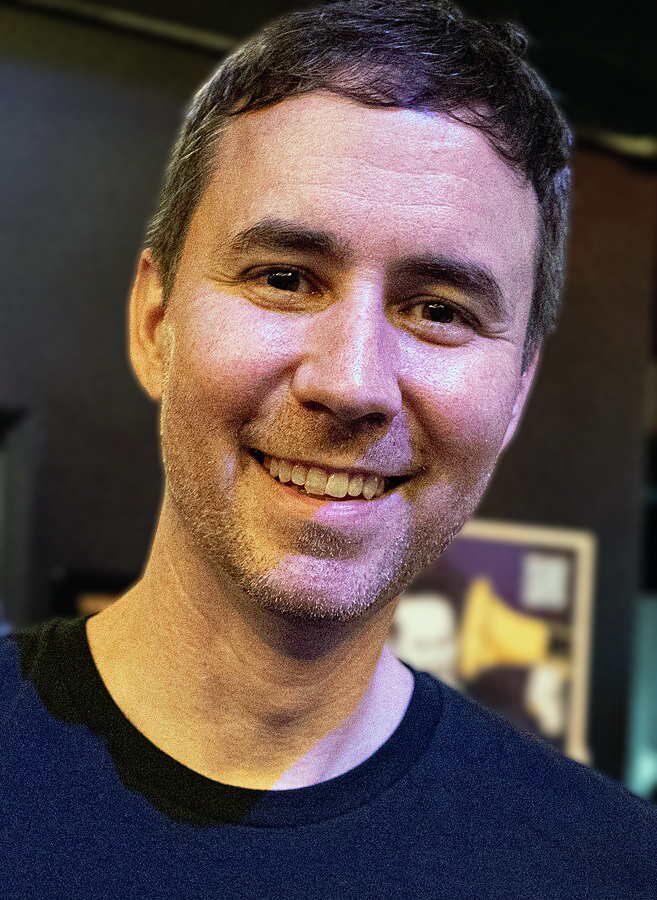
Tom Fulp, programmer and creator of Newgrounds

Since its founding the university has graduated over 100,000 alumni. Certificate-earning alumni such as artist Violet Oakley and illustrator Frank Schoonover reflect the early emphasis on art as part of the university's curriculum. With World War II, the university's technical programs swelled, and as a result Drexel graduated alumni such as Paul Baran, one of the founding fathers of the Internet and one of the inventors of the packet switching network, and Norman Joseph Woodland, the inventor of barcode technology. In addition to its emphasis on technology Drexel has graduated several notable athletes such as National Basketball Association (NBA) basketball players Michael Anderson, Damion Lee, and Malik Rose, and several notable business people, such as Raj Gupta, former president and chief executive officer (CEO) of Rohm and Haas, and Kenneth C. Dahlberg, former CEO of Science Applications International Corporation (SAIC). Alassane Dramane Ouattara President of the Republic of Ivory Coast. In 2018, Tirthak Saha, a 2016 graduate of the ECE school, was named to the Forbes 30 Under 30 list for achievements in the energy field.

In 1991, the university's centennial anniversary, Drexel created an association called the Drexel 100, for alumni who have demonstrated excellence work, philanthropy, or public service. After the creation of the association 100 alumni were inducted in 1992 and since then the induction process has been on a biennial basis. In 2006 164 total alumni had been inducted into the association.

== Awards ==
Drexel University created the annual $100,000 Anthony J. Drexel Exceptional Achievement Award to recognize a faculty member from a U.S. institution whose work transforms both research and the society it serves. The first recipient was bioengineer James J. Collins of Boston University (now at MIT) and the Howard Hughes Medical Institute.

In 2004, in conjunction with BAYADA Home Health Care, Drexel University's College of Nursing and Health Professions created the BAYADA Award for Technological Innovation in Nursing Education and Practice. The award honors nursing educators and practicing nurses whose innovation leads to improved patient care or improved nursing education.

== See also ==
- Association of Independent Technological Universities
