= Sara Jean Underwood =

American model (born 1984)

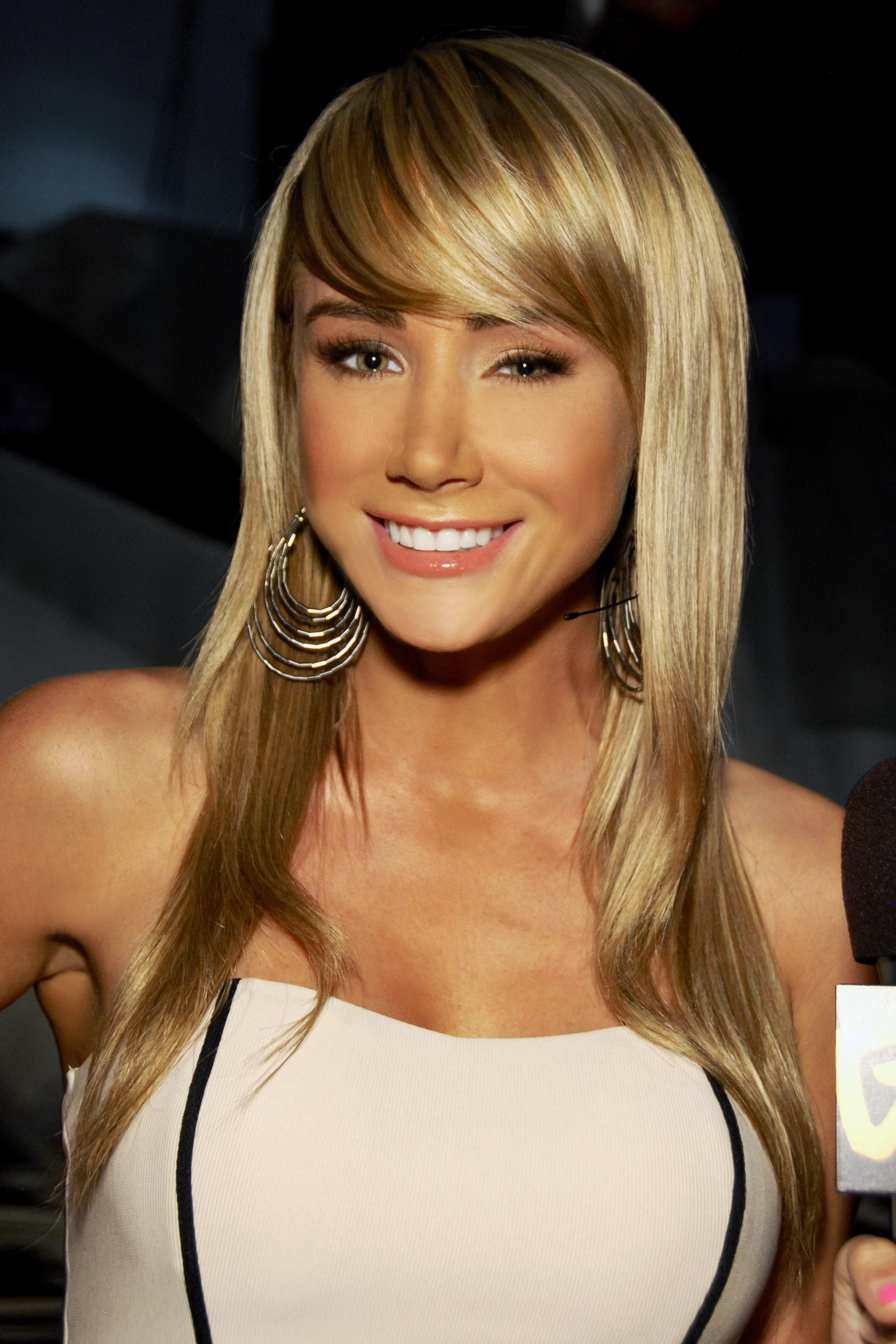
- Underwood at the E3 Expo 2011

Playboy centerfold appearance
- July 2006
- Preceded by: Stephanie Larimore
- Succeeded by: Nicole Voss

Playboy Playmate of the Year
- 2007
- Preceded by: Kara Monaco
- Succeeded by: Jayde Nicole

Personal details
- Born: March 26, 1984 (age 42) Portland, Oregon, U.S.

Sara Jean Underwood (born March 26, 1984) is an American model, television host and actress who was chosen as the Playmate of the Month for the July 2006 issue of Playboy magazine and later became Playmate of the Year in 2007. She is a former host of Attack of the Show! on G4.

== Early life ==
Underwood was born in Portland, Oregon. She graduated from Scappoose High School in Scappoose, Oregon, in 2002. She has been a student at Oregon State University and Portland State University.

Underwood was a schoolmate of American football player Derek Anderson. Her first job was assisting in sales of heavy construction equipment. She worked in the Beaverton, Oregon, branch of the Hooters chain of restaurants.

== Career ==
=== Modeling ===
Underwood first appeared in Playboy in its Girls of the Pac-10 pictorial in the October 2005 issue. She was featured on the cover, holding a football and clad only in a body painted rendering of an Oregon State Beavers football jersey and matching bikini briefs. She next appeared in the magazine in July 2006, as the Playmate of the Month. When she became Playmate of the Year in June 2007, her prize included a Mini Cooper convertible. She was the first Miss July to receive the title, although she herself said, "I didn't think I was pretty enough". In March 2008, Playboy magazine ranked her at #25 on their "25 Hottest Playboy Celebrities" list.

Underwood appeared in episode #2 of the E! network's series The Girls Next Door, as a Playmate hoping to have her test shoot taken at Playboy Studio West. Subsequently, Playboy featured her as Miss July 2006. She appeared in several more episodes of The Girls Next Door.

On June 7, 2007, a group of Oregon State University women's studies students created a poster celebrating Underwood's selection as Playboy's 2007 Playmate of the Year, and posted it outside Bexel Hall, where it remained in place for only a few hours before Oregon State University staff took it down. The poster embraced the theme and the style of the "Achievement" posters that line Campus Way at the university. The poster read, "Sara Jean: First OSU Beaver Playmate of the Year, Playboy June '07, OSU Centerfold, People, Ideas, Innovation." The mention of her as the "first" Playmate of the Year from OSU was actually incorrect; she was preceded by Jodi Ann Paterson, the Playmate of the Year for 2000.

Underwood is credited with discovering 2009 Playmate of the Year Ida Ljungqvist while shopping on Rodeo Drive in Beverly Hills, California.

=== Film and television ===
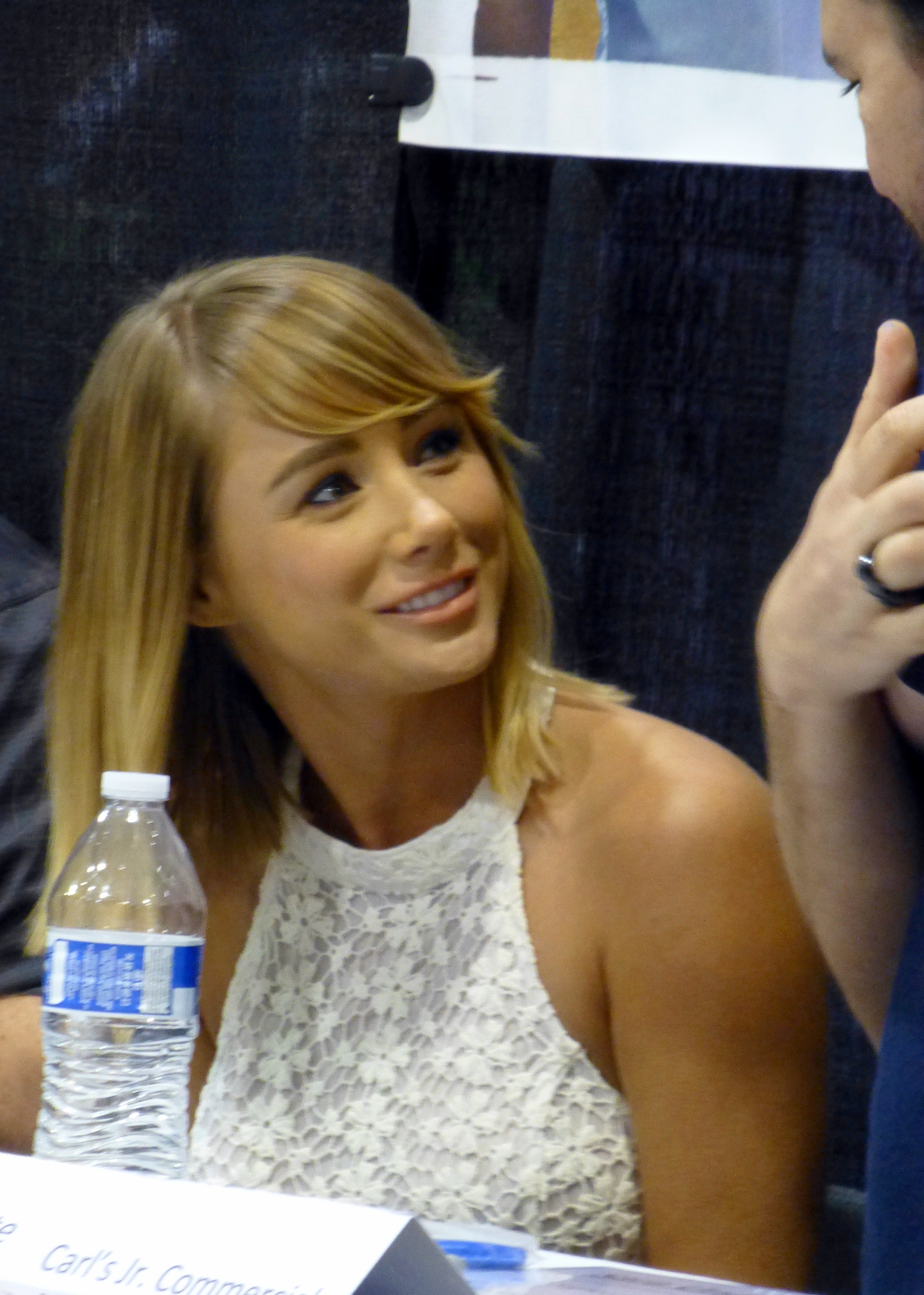
Underwood at Wizard World Chicago 2013

Underwood appears as a pirate wench in the 2007 film Epic Movie, along with fellow Playmates Qiana Chase, Irina Voronina and Jillian Grace. Underwood appeared as a playmate in the 2008 comedy, House Bunny, along with fellow playmates and in 2009 was in the film The Telling with Bridget Marquardt and Holly Madison, and as herself in Miss March. In 2013 Underwood was cast in the lead role in the horror thriller Deadly Weekend (also known as Zellwood).

Underwood appeared on the wedding episode of Kendra where it was announced at Kendra Wilkinson's bachelorette party that Underwood had undergone breast augmentation surgery. Later, on The Howard Stern Show, Underwood confirmed that she had breast implants.

Underwood has also worked in television as a presenter. She worked as a "fight jock" or continuity announcer for the Blackbelt TV cable network. In 2009, she co-hosted five episodes of G4's Attack of the Show, filling in for a vacationing Olivia Munn. She co-hosted episodes in 2010. In 2011, she was a substitute host and one of the regular presenters of The Feed.

An avid practitioner of yoga, Underwood competed in the eighth Kunoichi competition in Japan, known in the U.S. as Women of Ninja Warrior. She won her first stage heat after gaining a big lead on three Japanese contestants that had more pedigreed backgrounds in athletics. She failed on the second stage when she misjudged the second step of the Dancing Stones and fell.

After modeling in advertising for VictoryPoker.net and playing in charity poker tournaments, Underwood joined their team of professional poker players.

In 2012, Underwood was on MTV's reality show Ridiculousness as a guest star for Season 2. Lastly, Sara Jean Underwood appeared in 2 music videos. In 2015 she appeared in Kip Moore's video "Backseat". In 2009 she appeared in Pop Evil's video "100 In A 55".

== Filmography ==
=== Film ===
Year	Title	Role	Notes
2006	Accepted	Girl by pool	Uncredited
2007	Epic Movie	Pirate Wench	
2008	The House Bunny	Herself	Cameo
2009	Two Million Stupid Women	Ginger	
2009	Miss March	Herself	
2009	The Telling	Tracey	
2014	Deadly Weekend	Katie	

=== Television ===
Year	Title	Role	Notes
2009	Attack of the Show! co-host, 147 episodes.		
2009	Web Soup 2009 Golden Awards Guest		
	Kunoichi (Women of Ninja Warrior)		Competitor Competition 8, Exited at round 2.
	Bridget's Sexiest Beaches		Guest, Season 1 Episode 2, "Croatia"
2012	Ridiculousness		Guest

Athena Lundberg	Cassandra Lynn	Monica Leigh	Holley Ann Dorrough	Alison Waite	Stephanie Larimore
Sara Jean Underwood	Nicole Voss	Janine Habeck	Jordan Monroe	Sarah Elizabeth	Kia Drayton
