= The Girls Next Door: The Bunny House =

TV series pilot

- Also known as: The Girls of the Playboy Mansion: The Bunny House
- Created by: Kevin Burns
- No. of episodes: 1

Production
- Production companies: Fox Television Studios; Alta Loma Entertainment; Prometheus Entertainment

Original release
- Network: E!
- Release: August 8, 2010

Related
- The Girls Next Door; Kendra; Holly's World; Kendra on Top

The Girls Next Door: The Bunny House is a failed backdoor pilot for a potential third spin-off of The Girls Next Door, which aired on August 8, 2010.

== Synopsis ==
Meet the girls next door to The Girls Next Door, who inhabit the world's most exclusive sorority house. These girls date in similar circles and compete for the same gigs.

== Development ==
The planned seventh season of The Girls Next Door was to begin regularly featuring the residents of the Playmate House after Karissa and Kristina Shannon moved in following their break-ups with Hugh Hefner in January 2010. However Hefner asked them to move out after being displeased they had boyfriends. With Crystal Harris as the only remaining cast member of The Girls Next Door, it was decided a backdoor pilot that would focus completely on the residents of the Playmate House would be filmed.

While E! passed on the series, production had hopes that the series still had a chance. Jayde Nicole and Claire Sinclair were given roles on the upcoming second season of Holly's World in hopes that audiences would respond to their characters, therefore prompting renewed interest in The Bunny House. Holly's World was cancelled after its second season, alongside fellow The Girls Next Door spin-off Kendra, after the then-new E! president Bonnie Hammer vowed to "get rid of the more Playboy trashy element" from the network, which resulted in The Bunny House never being picked up to series.

== Cast ==
The show includes Jaime Edmondson, Hope Dworaczyk, Claire Sinclair, Jayde Nicole, Crystal McCahill, and Crystal Harris.

== Pilot ==
| No. overall | No. in season | Title | Original release date | U.S. viewers (millions) |
|---|---|---|---|---|
| 1 | 1 | "The Girls Next Door: The Bunny House" | August 8, 2010 | 1.467 |
As Claire Sinclair begins her life as a Playboy Playmate, Hope Dworaczyk prepares for the 2010 Playmate of the Year Awards Ceremony.
