= List of Playboy Playmates of 2009 =

The following is a list of Playboy Playmates of 2009, the 55th anniversary year of the publication. Playboy magazine names their Playmate of the Month each month throughout the year.

== January ==
Dasha Astafieva
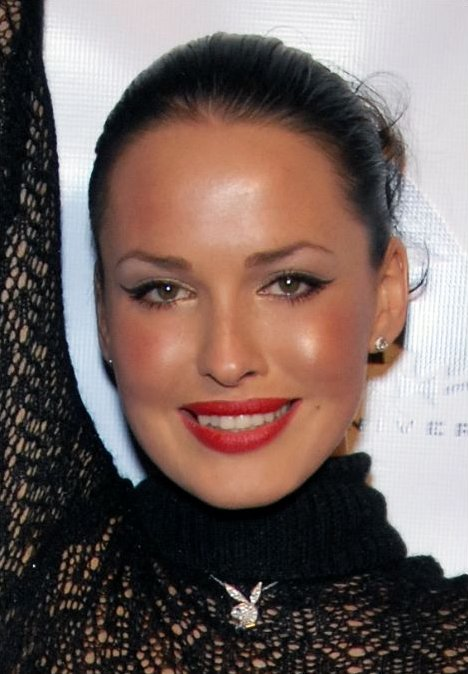
- Astafieva in 2008

Personal details
- Born: 4 August 1985 (age 41) Ordzhonikidze, Dnipropetrovsk Region, Ukrainian SSR
- Height: 5 ft 7 in (1.70 m)

Dasha Astafieva (Ukrainian: Дар'я Астаф'єва, romanized: Dasha Astafieva; born 4 August 1985) is a Ukrainian model, singer and actress. She is a former member of the Ukrainian pop group NikitA and has a solo career. She is Playboy's Playmate of the Month for January 2009. She is the 55th Anniversary Playmate. In 2011, she became the spokeswoman for AnastasiaDate, an online dating website.

=== Discography ===
1. 2012 – "Avocado" (ft. NikitA)

== February ==
Jessica Burciaga
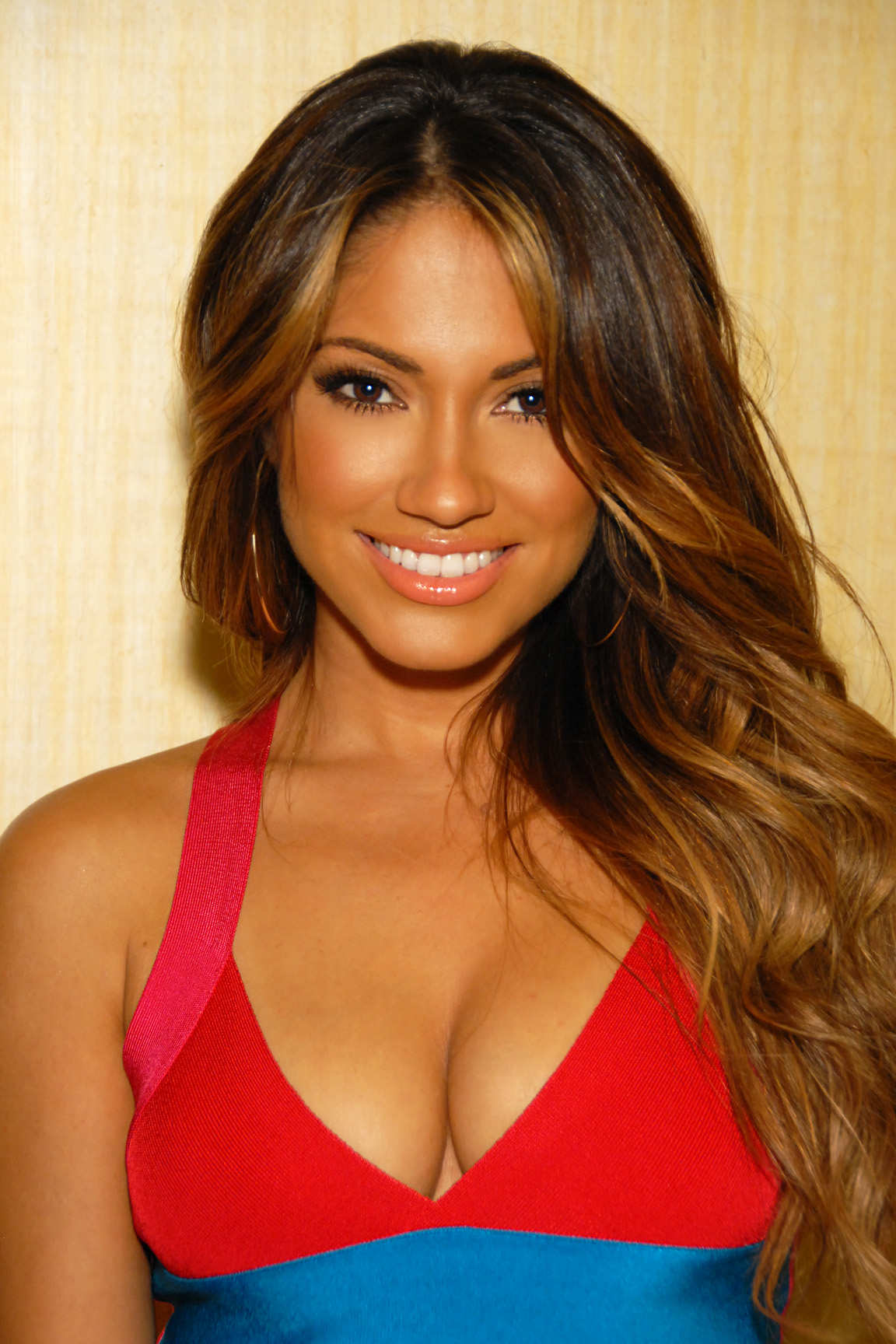
- Burciaga in 2011

Personal details
- Born: 11 April 1983 (age 43) Santa Fe Springs, California, U.S.
- Height: 5 ft 2 in (1.57 m)}

Jessica Burciaga (born 11 April 1983) is an American model and former fitness trainer. Her father is Mexican and her mother is French and Irish. She is Playboy's February 2009 Playmate of the Month. She was also a Playboy Bunny and blackjack dealer at the Palms Casino Resort in Las Vegas. Burciaga filed a lawsuit, along with models Leilani Dowding and Eva Pepaja, against a strip club in Tampa, Florida, for using photographs of them without their permission. In 2019, she was featured in Cassper Nyovest's music video for Move For Me.

Jessica Burciaga has two brothers.

== March ==
Jennifer Pershing
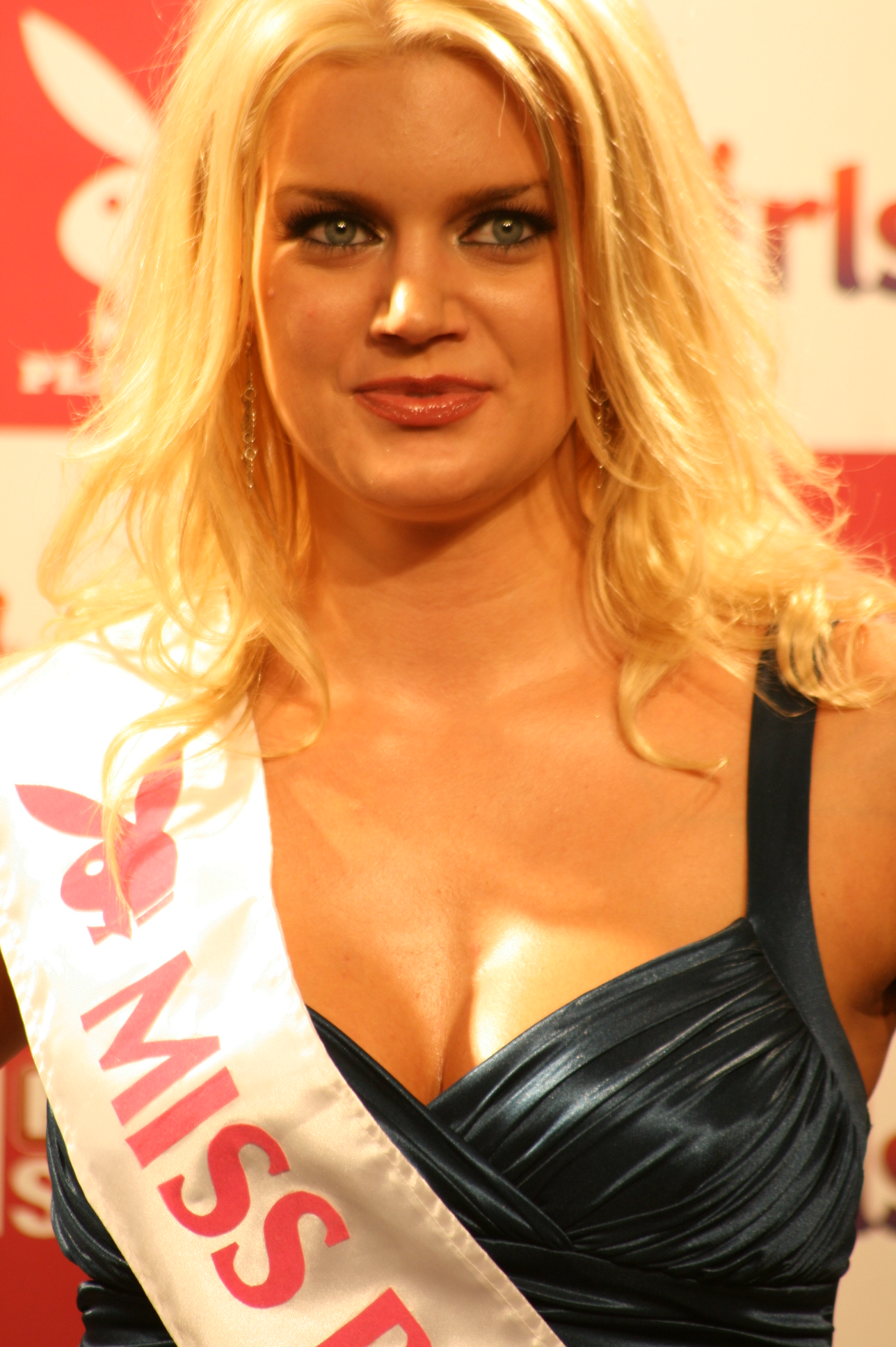
- Pershing in 2009

Personal details
- Born: Jennifer Ackley; 19 June 1980 (age 46) Somers Point, New Jersey, U.S.
- Height: 5 ft 8 in (173 cm)

Jennifer Pershing (born 19 June 1980) is an American model. Pershing graduated from Mainland Regional High School in 1998. She moved to Los Angeles with her husband, filmmaker Steven Pershing. Pershing was discovered by Playboy when she was at the Key Club in Hollywood seeing an '80s cover band, Steel Panther, perform. She is Playboy's March 2009 Playmate of the Month. Pershing's pictorial and centerfold were photographed by Playboy photographer Arny Freytag.

== April ==
Hope Dworaczyk
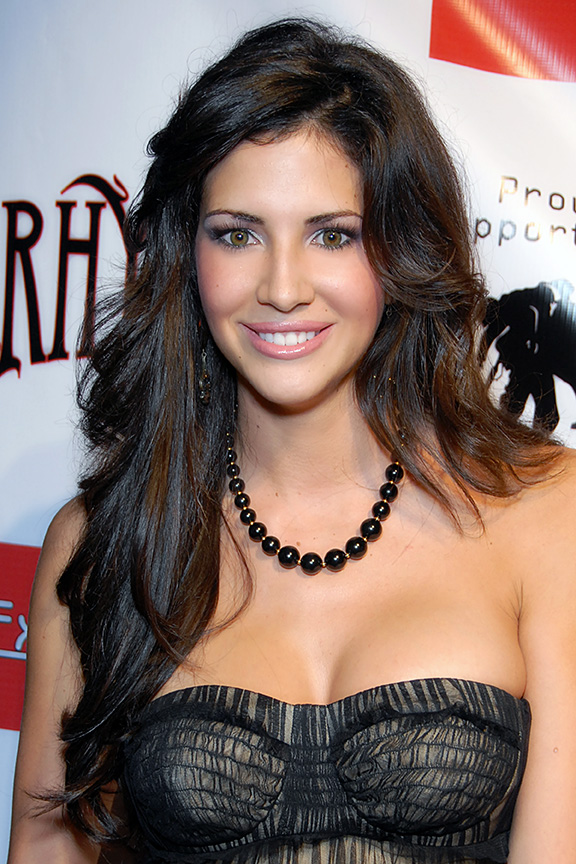

Playboy Playmate of the Year
- 2010
- Preceded by: Ida Ljungqvist
- Succeeded by: Claire Sinclair

Personal details
- Born: 21 November 1984 (age 41) Port Lavaca, Texas, U.S.
- Height: 5 ft 10 in (1.78 m)

Hope Dworaczyk (born 21 November 1984) is an American model who is the Playboy Playmate of the Month for April 2009. She tested for the 55th Anniversary Playmate search. She is the 2010 Playmate of the Year.

She was a contestant in the Spring 2011 edition of Celebrity Apprentice.

== May ==
Crystal McCahill
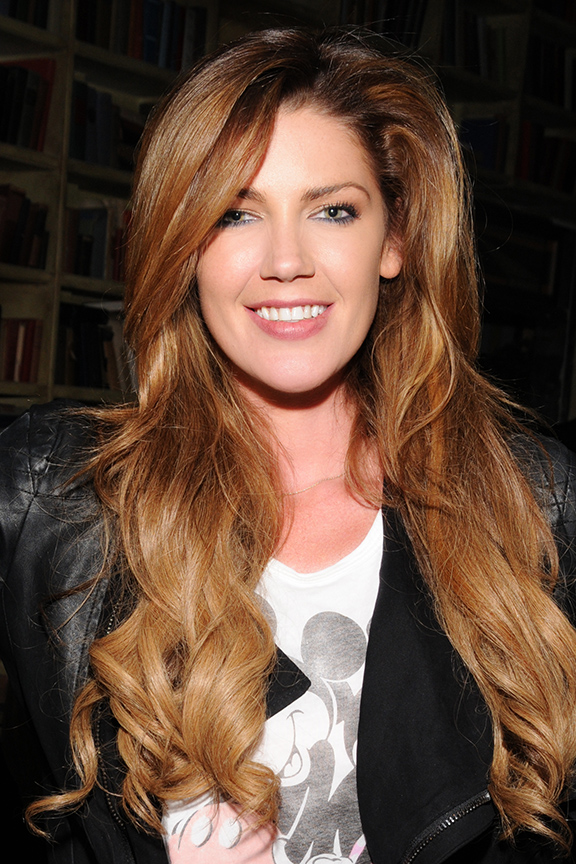

Personal details
- Born: 18 December 1983 (age 42) River Forest, Illinois, U.S.
- Height: 5 ft 7 in (1.70 m)

Crystal McCahill (born 18 December 1983) is an American model who is the Playboy Playmate of the Month for May 2009. Her mother Gale Olson, is Playmate of the Month for August 1968. McCahill is the second daughter to become a second-generation Playmate, following Simone Eden in 1989. In 2010, McCahill co-starred on The Girls Next Door: The Bunny House.

McCahill was born in River Forest, Illinois, grew up in Illinois, and was homeschooled. She started participating in beauty pageants when she was nine. She was discovered by Holly Madison and Bridget Marquardt while eating at a Hooters. In March 2009, McCahill was arrested under suspicion of a DUI. At that time, she was working at a nightclub in Chicago. She was released of the charges. In 2013, McCahill had a minor role in Sin City: A Dame to Kill For.

== June ==
Candice Cassidy

Personal details
- Born: Candice Weekly; 23 October 1985 (age 41) Portsmouth, Ohio, U.S.
- Height: 5 ft 9 in (1.75 m)

Candice Cassidy (born 23 October 1985) is the Playboy Playmate of the Month for June 2009 after being a Cyber Girl in 2006. Playboy founder, Hugh Hefner designed the photoshoot, the first he had designed in over 10 years. Holly Madison directed the photoshoot and the photography was provided by Arny Freytag. Her stage last name, Cassidy, is the name of a cousin.

Weekly was born in Portsmouth, Ohio and graduated from Portsmouth West High School in 2004. She has a degree in psychology from Shawnee State University. As of 2009, she owned a dance studio in Portsmouth, Ohio.

== July and August ==
Kristina and Karissa Shannon
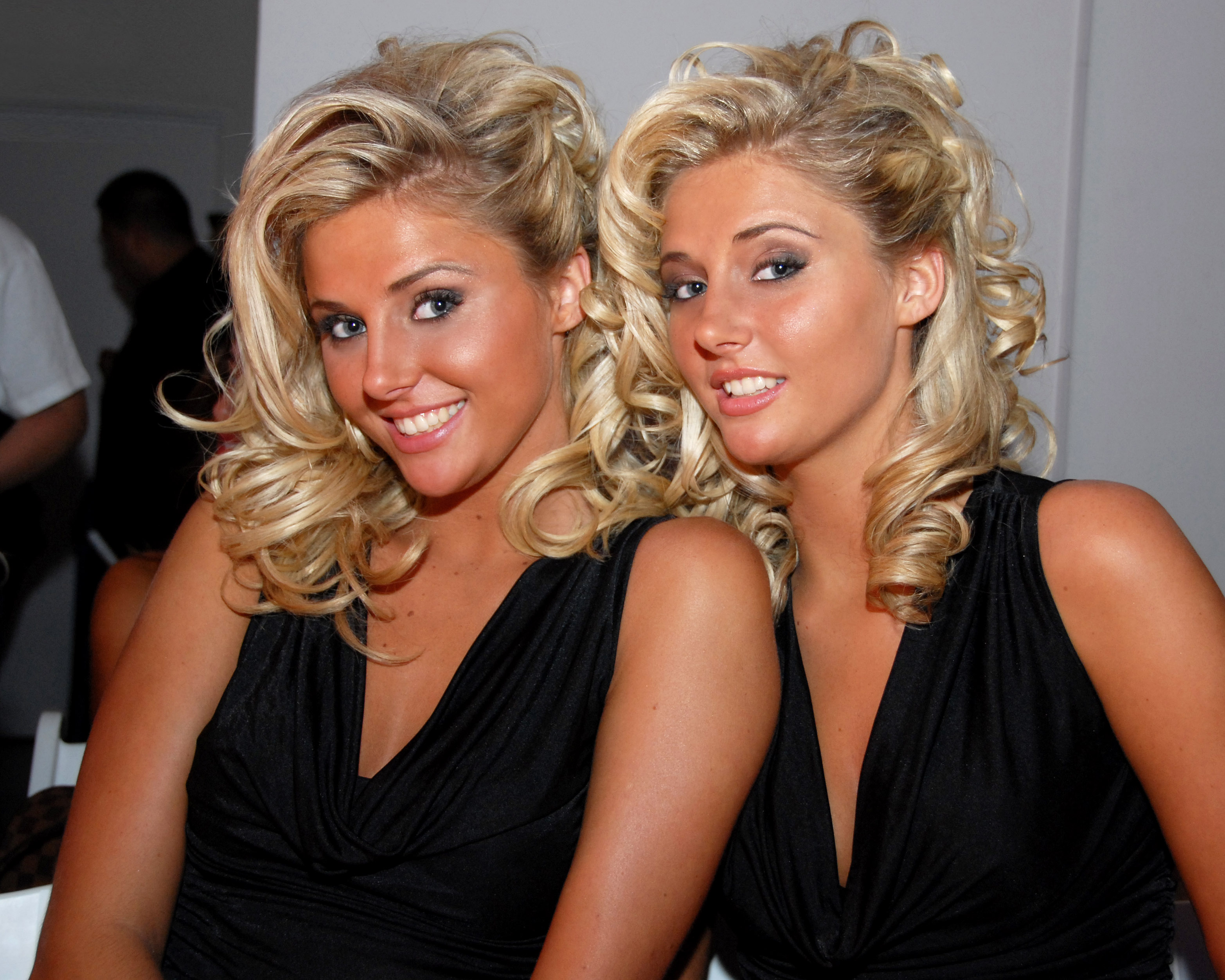
- Karissa (left) and Kristina in 2008

Personal details
- Born: 2 October 1989 (age 37) Ann Arbor, Michigan, U.S.
- Height: 5 ft 10 in (1.78 m) 125 lb (57 kg)

Kristina and Karissa Shannon (born 2 October 1989) are American models and twin sisters. Hugh Hefner of Playboy chose them as his next set of girlfriends, replacing Bridget Marquardt and Kendra Wilkinson. They appeared in the 2009 double "Summer Issue" of Playboy. Per the Playmate Data Sheet included in that issue, Karissa was named Miss July and Kristina was named Miss August.

They were born in Ann Arbor, Michigan.

== September ==
Kimberly Phillips
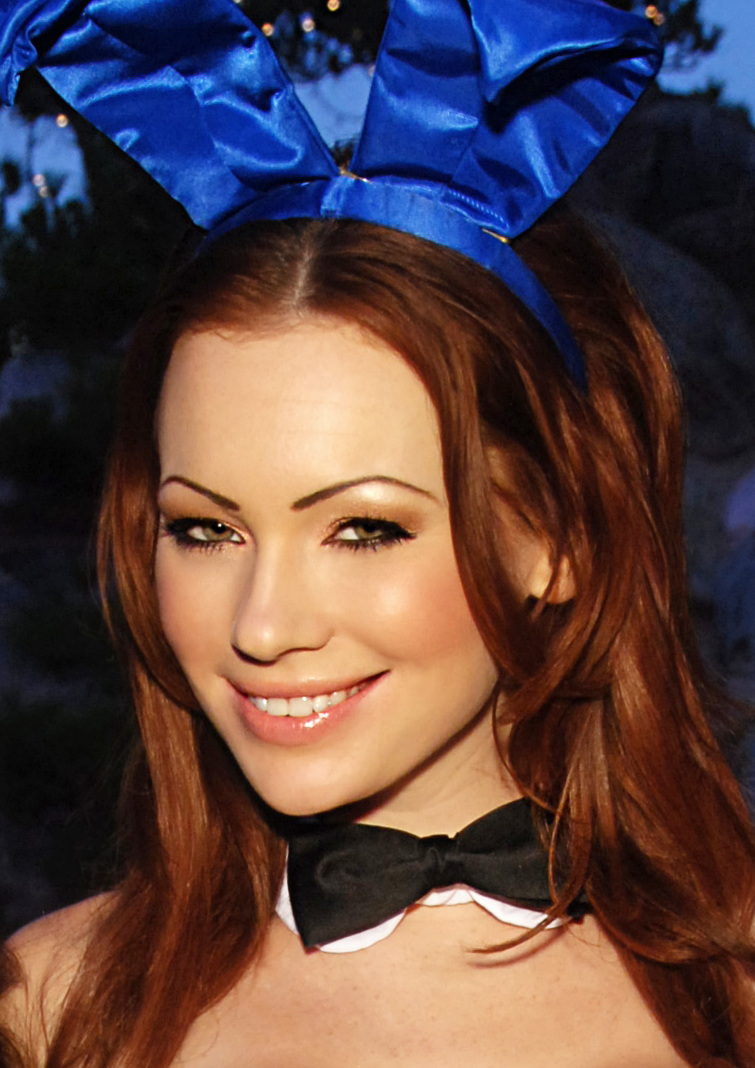
- Phillips in 2011.

Personal details
- Born: 9 January 1987 (age 39) Fountain Valley, California, U.S.
- Height: 5 ft 8 in (1.73 m)

Kimberly Phillips (born January 9, 1987) is the Playboy Playmate of the Month for September 2009. Her centerfold was photographed by Stephen Wayda. She later appeared on the cover of Playboy's October 2010 issue.

Phillips graduated from Corona High School in Corona, California. Prior to becoming a Playmate, Phillips was attending college and working as a preschool teacher and waitress. She was discovered after a friend submitted amateur portraits of Phillips to Playboy. In a 2009 interview with the Las Vegas Sun, Phillips shared that she has had breast augmentation surgery, which was paid for by a customer at a restaurant she used to work at prior to becoming a Playmate. Phillips lives in Los Angeles.

== October ==
Lindsey Gayle Evans
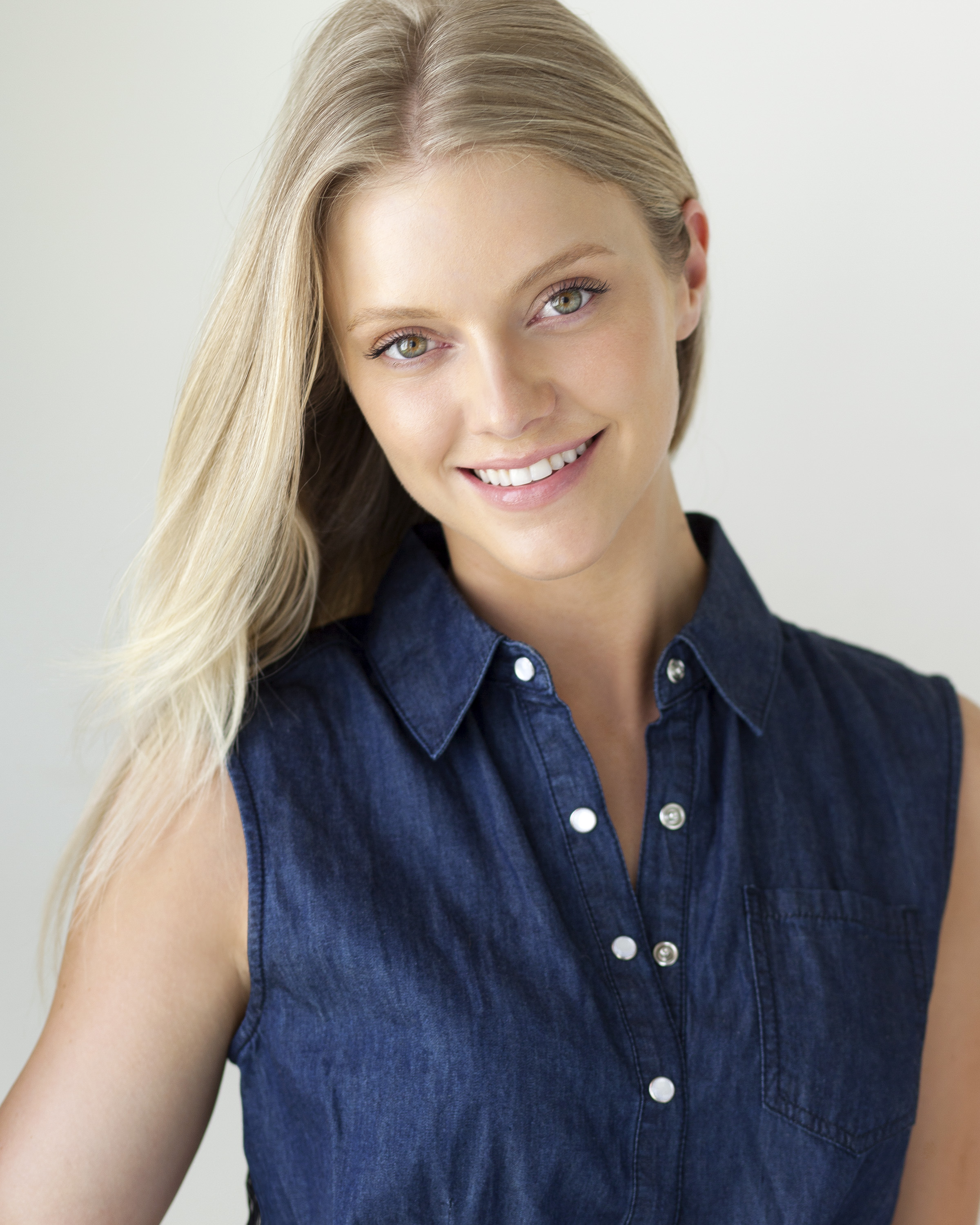

Personal details
- Born: Lindsey Gayle Evans; 9 December 1989 (age 36) Paris, Texas, U.S.
- Height: 5 ft 10 in (1.78 m)

Lindsey Gayle Evans (born 9 December 1989) is an American model and beauty queen who is the Playboy Playmate of the Month for October 2009. Her pictorial was photographed by Stephen Wayda. She won the Miss Louisiana Teen USA title in 2007, but was replaced eleven months later following her arrest over an incident in a restaurant, where marijuana was found in her purse, and she and three friends were accused of not paying their bill.

== November ==
Kelley Thompson
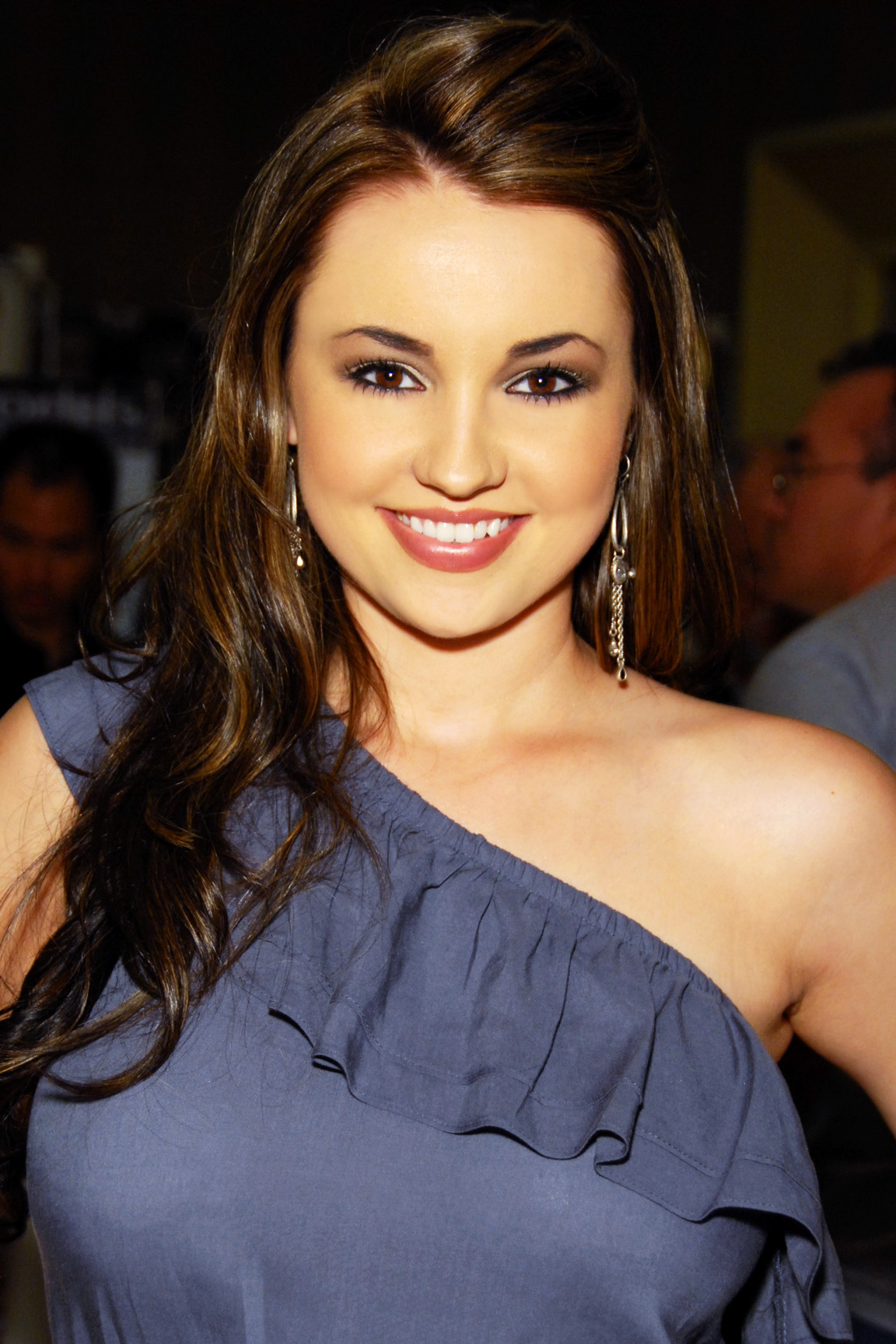

Personal details
- Born: 8 December 1987 (age 38) Tyler, Texas, U.S.
- Height: 5 ft 6 in (1.68 m)

Kelley Thompson (born 8 December 1987) is an American model. She is the Playboy Playmate of the Month for November 2009.

Thompson grew up in Gilmer, Texas. She attended Harmony Junior High School, where she was a cheerleader. Thompson bartended in Texas prior to becoming a Playmate. She was discovered at a Playboy open call in Dallas, Texas. A fitness model, in 2015, Thompson won two gold medals at the NPC Better Bodies Championship. Thompson is married to Lance Thompson.

== December ==
Crystal Harris
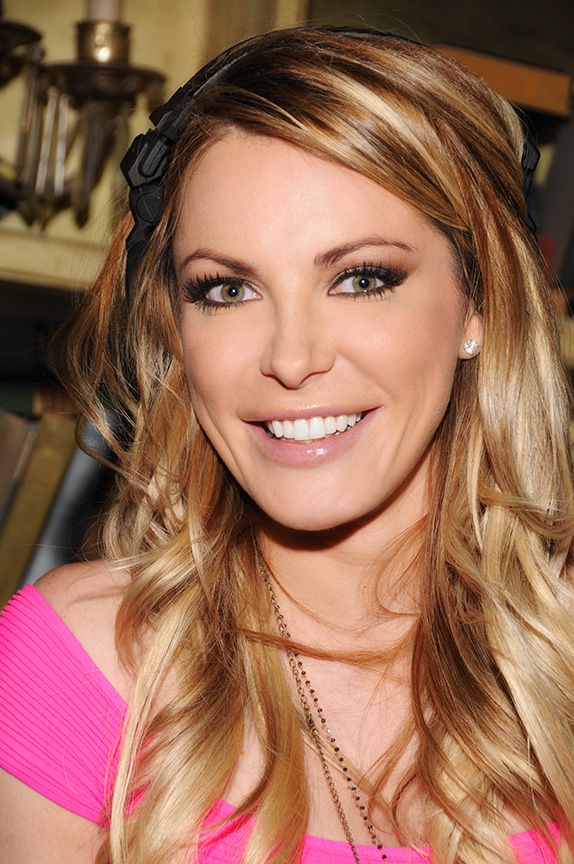
- Crystal Harris, 2014

Personal details
- Born: 29 April 1986 (age 40) Lake Havasu City, Arizona, U.S.
- Height: 5 ft 6 in (1.68 m)

Crystal Harris (born 29 April 1986) is a British-American model and singer who is the Playboy Playmate of the Month for December 2009. She also appeared as "Coed of the Week" for the week of 30 October 2008, at Playboy's Cyber Club under the name Crystal Carter.

== See also ==
- List of people in Playboy 2000–2009

Dasha Astafieva	Jessica Burciaga	Jennifer Pershing	Hope Dworaczyk	Crystal McCahill	Candice Cassidy
Karissa Shannon	Kristina Shannon	Kimberly Phillips	Lindsey Gayle Evans	Kelley Thompson	Crystal Harris
