= Louis van Amstel =

Dutch-American dancer and choreographer

- Born: June 23, 1972 (age 54); Amsterdam, Netherlands
- Citizenship: American
- Occupations: Dancer, choreographer
- Years active: 2005–present
- Spouse: Joshua Lancaster (m. 2017; div. 2023)

Louis van Amstel (born June 23, 1972, in Amsterdam) is a Dutch-American ballroom dance champion, professional dancer, and choreographer who appears on the American reality television series Dancing with the Stars.

== Early life ==
Louis van Amstel was born in Amsterdam; his grandparents were competitive ballroom dancers. He began dancing at 10 and entered competitions at 15. He stopped attending school at 16 to pursue dancing full-time.

== Career ==
=== Early career ===
Van Amstel competed professionally with Julie Fryer. They were coached by Ruud Vermeij. In 1990, Van Amstel and Fryer became Dutch Latin Champions and 10 Dance Champions. They also made the final in the 'under 21' category in Blackpool. During the same year, they received a bronze medal at the German Open, at the World Latin and at the European 10 Dance. In the Worlds 10 Dance Championship, Van Amstel and Fryer got fourth place.

In 1991, Van Amstel and Fryer won the national championships for the second time, and got fourth place in all major championships. A year later, Van Amstel decided that he wanted to retire from competing for a while and ended his partnership with Fryer for the first time. Three years later, in 1994, the partnership was re-established, and Van Amstel and Fryer went on to win three world Latin Dance championship gold medals in 1994, 1995 and 1996.

In 1997, Van Amstel retired from competitive ballroom dancing, moved to New York City, and became an American citizen in July 1999. He returned to competitive dancing with partner Karina Smirnoff; they won the United States national championship in 2000.

=== Dancing with the Stars ===
Van Amstel was cast for season one of Dancing with the Stars in early 2005. He was partnered with Trista Sutter, but they were the first to be eliminated from the competition. In the show's second season, he was partnered with hostess Lisa Rinna, with whom he reached fourth place.

Van Amstel returned in season three and was partnered with High School Musical star Monique Coleman. During the eighth week of the competition, they received two 10s for their Cha-Cha-Cha marking Van Amstel's only 10s of Dancing with the Stars for an individual dance for many seasons to come. They made it to the semi-finals, but were eliminated, resulting in a fourth-place finish. He did not participate in the fourth season due to all the females being taller than him, but he nonetheless maintained a role as a performer and choreographer throughout the season and season five.

He returned in season six and was partnered with actress, businesswoman, and wife of Elvis Presley, Priscilla Presley. The couple made it to the fifth week, but were eliminated, resulting in an eighth-place finish.

He returned in season nine and was partnered with reality TV star and singer Kelly Osbourne. The couple made it to the finale where they finished in third place, marking Van Amstel's first and only time to make it to the finals to date. In season ten of Dancing with the Stars, Van Amstel was partnered with Reno 911! star Niecy Nash. The couple made it to the eighth week, but were eliminated, resulting in a fifth-place finish.

For season eleven of Dancing with the Stars, Van Amstel was partnered with actress and comedian Margaret Cho. The couple made it to the third week, but were eliminated, resulting in a tenth-place finish. Van Amstel appeared in Cho's comedy music album Cho Dependent as her therapist. In July 2011, he appeared alongside Cho as himself in the fourth episode of the third season of Drop Dead Diva.

For the show's twelfth season, Van Amstel was partnered with playboy model and reality star Kendra Wilkinson. During the fifth week in the competition, they danced the 1000th competitive dance. The couple made it to the seventh week, but were eliminated, resulting in a sixth-place finish. Wilkinson later published her book, Being Kendra, in which she said she and van Amstel clashed constantly and that he called her dyslexic and learning disabled. Van Amstel denied the comments, calling her book "twisted". Nevertheless, Van Amstel made two appearances on Wilkinson's reality shows Kendra and Kendra on Top, though Wilkinson described their encounters as "awkward".

Van Amstel returned for season 15 of Dancing with the Stars, the All Stars season, and was partnered with former contestant, Sabrina Bryan. In the sixth week of the competition, the pair scored the first perfect 30 of the season. This was also Van Amstel's first perfect score ever after nine seasons on Dancing with the Stars. The couple made it to the sixth week, but were eliminated, despite being at the top of the leaderboard, resulting in an eighth-place finish. This was also the same week that Bryan was shockingly eliminated in her original season. In Week 8, Van Amstel was chosen by Kelly Monaco and her partner Val Chmerkovskiy to be their partner in their trio dance.

Van Amstel was not asked back for season 16 of Dancing with the Stars.

On September 2, 2015, he was announced as a pro for season 21 after a 5-season hiatus. He was paired with celebrity chef, Paula Deen. They were eliminated on week 6 of competition and finished in 9th place.

Van Amstel returned to the show for season 31. He was partnered with actress Cheryl Ladd.

=== Other work ===
During his time off from Dancing with the Stars, Van Amstel set up a not-for-profit dance company called "Visionworx Dance Theater," which combines all four major dance forms. He also choreographed and appeared on numerous TV shows such as The Suite Life of Zack & Cody, Hannah Montana, and All My Children.

After season six of Dancing with the Stars, Van Amstel was asked to create and choreograph a show called Ballroom with a Twist, which featured a rotating cast of dancers. The show also featured former American Idol contestants including David Hernandez and Carly Smithson. Ballroom With a Twist toured in theaters around the country. Van Amstel is no longer associated with the show.

He choreographed seven dances on season 5 of So You Think You Can Dance. Three of the seven dances made it to the finale and were mentioned as the judges' favorite picks at the Kodak theater in Hollywood. He continued choreographing in seasons 6, 7, and 8.

Van Amstel runs a dance fitness program, LaBlast. LaBlast DVDs were released in early 2012. During the summer of that year, Van Amstel started a fitness clothing line, branded LVA.

In fall 2014, Van Amstel was seen as a judge on the Dutch show Celebrity Pole Dancing, a show where Dutch celebrities are taught how to pole dance and perform.

== Personal life ==
Van Amstel is openly gay. However, he does not explicitly use the word "gay" because he does not want to be stigmatized. On January 8, 2017, Van Amstel married his long-time boyfriend Joshua Lancaster in Sundance, Utah. On October 16, 2023, van Amstel announced on Instagram that the couple had divorced. They have two adopted sons, Daniel and Jonathan.

In November 2019, Van Amstel made headlines after he revealed that a substitute teacher shamed his son for having two gay dads and subjected his fifth-grade class to a 10-minute anti-gay lecture. The school promptly fired the teacher.

== Dancing with the Stars performances ==
Season	Partner	Place	Average Score
1	Trista Sutter	6th	18.50
2	Lisa Rinna	4th	24.38
3	Monique Coleman	4th	25.30
6	Priscilla Presley	8th	22.80
9	Kelly Osbourne	3rd	24.24
10	Niecy Nash	5th	20.64
11	Margaret Cho	10th	17.00
12	Kendra Wilkinson	6th	21.38
15	Sabrina Bryan	8th	27.07
21	Paula Deen	9th	17.57
31	Cheryl Ladd	14th	16.50

=== Season 1 ===
With Trista Sutter

Week #	Dance/Song	Judges' score			Total	Result
Week #	Dance/Song	Inaba	Goodman	Tonioli	Total	Result
1	Waltz / "Come Away with Me"	6	6	6	18	No Elimination
2	Rumba / "Endless Love"	6	7	6	19	Eliminated

=== Season 2 ===
With Lisa Rinna

Week #	Dance/Song	Judges' score			Total	Result
Week #	Dance/Song	Inaba	Goodman	Tonioli	Total	Result
1	Waltz/ "(You Make Me Feel Like) A Natural Woman"	5	7	7	19	Safe
2	Rumba/"Your Song"	6	7	7	20	Safe
3	Jive/"Jailhouse Rock"	8	9	8	25	Safe
4	Paso Doble/"The Final Countdown"	9	9	8	26	Safe
5	Samba/"Le Freak"	7	9	9	25	Safe
6	Quickstep/"9 to 5"	9	9	9	27	Bottom Two
7	Foxtrot/"Fever"	8	9	9	53 (26 + 27)	Eliminated
7	Cha-Cha-Cha/"Material Girl"	9	9	9	53 (26 + 27)	Eliminated

=== Season 3 ===
With Monique Coleman

Week #	Dance/Song	Judges' score			Total	Result
Week #	Dance/Song	Inaba	Goodman	Tonioli	Total	Result
1	Foxtrot/"Baby Love"	6	6	7	19	Safe
2	Mambo/"Bop to the Top"	9	8	9	26	Safe
3	Jive/"The Heat Is On"	9	9	9	27	Safe
4	Waltz/"If I Were A Painting"	8	8	8	24	Bottom Two
5	Rumba/"Samba de Verão"	9	9	9	27	Safe
6	Samba/"ABC"	9	7	7	23	Safe
7	Quickstep/"Luck Be a Lady"; Paso Doble/"The Reflex"	9; 9	9; 9	9; 9	54 (27 + 27)	Bottom Two
8	Tango/"Somebody's Watching Me"; Cha-Cha-Cha/"Ghostbusters Theme"	8; 9	8; 10	8; 10	53 (24 + 29)	Eliminated

=== Season 6 ===
With Priscilla Presley

Week #	Dance/Song	Judges' score			Total	Result
Week #	Dance/Song	Inaba	Goodman	Tonioli	Total	Result
1	Foxtrot/"Feeling Good"	8	8	8	24	No Elimination
2	Mambo/"Deixa Isso Pra La"	7	7	7	21	Safe
3	Tango/"El Choclo"	8	9	9	26	Safe
4	Viennese Waltz/"Do Right Woman, Do Right Man"	7	7	8	22	Bottom Two
5	Rumba/"The First Time Ever I Saw Your Face"	7	7	7	21	Eliminated

=== Season 9 ===
With Kelly Osbourne

Week #	Dance/Song	Judges' score			Total	Result
Week #	Dance/Song	Inaba	Goodman	Tonioli	Total	Result
1	Viennese Waltz/"Trouble"; Cha-Cha-Cha/"Centerfold"	7 Awarded	8; 8	8 Points	31 (23 + 8)	Safe
2	Tango/"Take Me on the Floor"	6	7*	6	19	Safe
3	Samba/"LoveGame"	7	6	7	20	Safe
4	Charleston/"Cabaret"	8	7	8	23	Safe
5	Paso Doble/"Crazy Train"	8	8	8	24	Safe
6	Jitterbug/"Bread and Butter"; Mambo Marathon/"Ran Kan Kan"	7 Awarded	6; 5	7 Points	25 (20 + 5)	Safe
7	Salsa/"Good Lovin'"; Team Tango/"You Give Love a Bad Name"	8; 9	8; 9	8; 10	52 (24 + 28)	Safe
8	Foxtrot/"Mama Do (Uh Oh Uh Oh)" '60s Jive/"River Deep - Mountain High"	8; 8	8; 9	9; 9	51 (25 + 26)	Last to Be Called Safe
9	Rumba/"Angels"; Quickstep/"99 Red Balloons"; Cha-Cha-Cha/"Girls Just Want to Have Fun"	8; 9; 9	8; 9; 9	8; 9; 9	78 (24 + 27 + 27)	Last to Be; Called Safe
10	Argentine Tango/"Los Vino"; Megamix/"You and Me", "Whenever, Wherever", "Maniac"; Freestyle/"I Will Survive"; Viennese Waltz/"Trouble"	9 Awarded; 8 Awarded	9; 26; 8; 26	8 Points; 8 Points	102 (26 + +26 + 24 + +26)	Third Place

^*Due to Len Goodman's absence in week 2, the 7 was awarded by stand-in guest judge Baz Luhrmann.

=== Season 10 ===
With Niecy Nash

Week #	Dance/Song	Judges' score			Total	Result
Week #	Dance/Song	Inaba	Goodman	Tonioli	Total	Result
1	Cha-Cha-Cha/"Rescue Me"	7	5	6	18	No Elimination
2	Foxtrot/"Love You I Do"	7	7	7	21	Safe
3	Waltz/"With You I'm Born Again"	7	7	7	21	Safe
4	Rumba/"Taking Chances" - Technique; Rumba/"Taking Chances" - Performance	6; 6	6; 6	6; 6	36 (18 + 18)	Last to Be Called Safe
5	Jive/"La Bamba"	6	6	6	18	Safe
6	Argentine Tango/"El Sonido De La Milonga"; Swing Marathon/"In the Mood"	7 Awarded	7; 5	7 Points	26 (21 + 5)	Bottom Two
7	Quickstep/"You're the Top"; Team Madonna/"Holiday"	9; 8	8; 8	8; 8	49 (25 + 24)	Safe
8	Viennese Waltz/"I Got You Babe" '90s Paso Doble/"Rhythm is a Dancer"	7; 7	8; 6	8; 7	43 (23 + 20)	Eliminated

=== Season 11 ===
With Margaret Cho

Week #	Dance/Song	Judges' score			Total	Result
Week #	Dance/Song	Inaba	Goodman	Tonioli	Total	Result
1	Viennese Waltz/"We Are the Champions"	5	5	5	15	Safe
2	Jive/"Dreaming	6	6	6	18	Safe
3	Samba/"Copacabana"	6	6	6	18	Eliminated

=== Season 12 ===
With Kendra Wilkinson

Week #	Dance/Song	Judges' score				Total	Result
Week #	Dance/Song	Inaba	Goodman	Tonioli	Guest Judges	Total	Result
1	Cha-Cha-Cha/"When Love Takes Over"	6	6	6	N/A	18	No Elimination
2	Quickstep/"Gotta Work"	7	6	6	N/A	19	Safe
3	Rumba/"You and Me"	8	7	8	N/A	23	Safe
4	Viennese Waltz/"Time to Say Goodbye"	6	6	6	N/A	18	Safe
5	Foxtrot/"Yankee Doodle Dandy"	8	7	7	N/A	22	Safe
6	Samba/"Livin' la Vida Loca"	8	8	9	N/A	25	Safe
7	Team Cha-Cha-Cha/"We R Who We R"; Tango/"Jealousy"	7; 8	8; 7	8; 8	7*; 8*	61 (30 + 31)	Eliminated

^*The additional scores of 7 and 8 were awarded by guest judge Donnie Burns.

=== Season 15 ===
With Sabrina Bryan

Week #	Dance/Song	Judges' score				Total	Result
Week #	Dance/Song	Inaba	Goodman	Tonioli	Guest Judges	Total	Result
1	Cha-Cha-Cha/"What Makes You Beautiful"	7.5	7.5	7.5	N/A	22.5	Safe
2	Quickstep/"Black Betty"	9	8.5	8.5	N/A	26	Safe
3	Paso Doble/"Free Your Mind"	8.5	8.5	8.5	N/A	25.5	Bottom Three
4	Disco/"You Should Be Dancing"	9	9	9	8.5*	35.5	Safe
5	Waltz/"So This Is Love"; Team Freestyle (Shawn)/"Call Me Maybe"	10; 9.5	9.5; 10	9.5; 10	N/A	58.5 (29 29.5)	No Elimination
6	Rumba/"Wanted"	10	10	10	N/A	30	Eliminated

^*The additional score of 8.5 was awarded by guest judge Paula Abdul.

=== Season 21 ===
With Paula Deen

Week #	Dance/Song	Judges' score				Total	Result
Week #	Dance/Song	Inaba	Hough	Tonioli	Guest Judges	Total	Result
1	Quickstep/"Hey Good Lookin'"	5	5	5	N/A	15	No Elimination
2	Rumba/"Midnight Train to Georgia"; Tango/ "Get Ready"	7; 6	6; 6	6; 6	N/A	19; 18	Safe
3	Samba / "The Ballad of Gilligan's Isle"	5	5	5	5^{1}	20	Last to be called safe
4	Cha-Cha-Cha / "Respect"	6	6	6	N/A	18	Safe
5^{2}	Jive / "Shake"	7	7	6	6^{3}	26	No Elimination
6	Jazz / "Vogue"	6	6	6	6^{4}	24	Eliminated

With Tamar Braxton (Switch-Up)

Week #	Dance/Song	Judges' score				Total	Result
Week #	Dance/Song	Inaba	Hough	Tonioli	Guest Judges	Total	Result
5	Samba / "End Of Time"	7	7	7	8^{3}	29	No Elimination

^{1} Score given by guest judge Alfonso Ribeiro.

^{2} This week only, for "Partner Switch-Up" week, Deen performed with Mark Ballas instead of Louis van Amstel. Louis performed with Tamar Braxton.

^{3} Score given by guest judge Maksim Chmerkovskiy.

^{4} Score given by guest judge Olivia Newton-John.

=== Season 31 ===
With Cheryl Ladd

Week #	Dance/Song	Judges' score				Total	Result
Week #	Dance/Song	Inaba	Goodman	Hough	Tonioli	Total	Result
1	Cha-cha-cha / "Got to Give it Up"	6	5	5	5	21	Safe
2	Tango / "A Little Less Conversation"	5	6	5	5	21	Bottom Two
3	Rumba / "Diamonds Are Forever"	6	6	6	6	24	Eliminated
