= Crystal Hefner =

American model (born 1986)

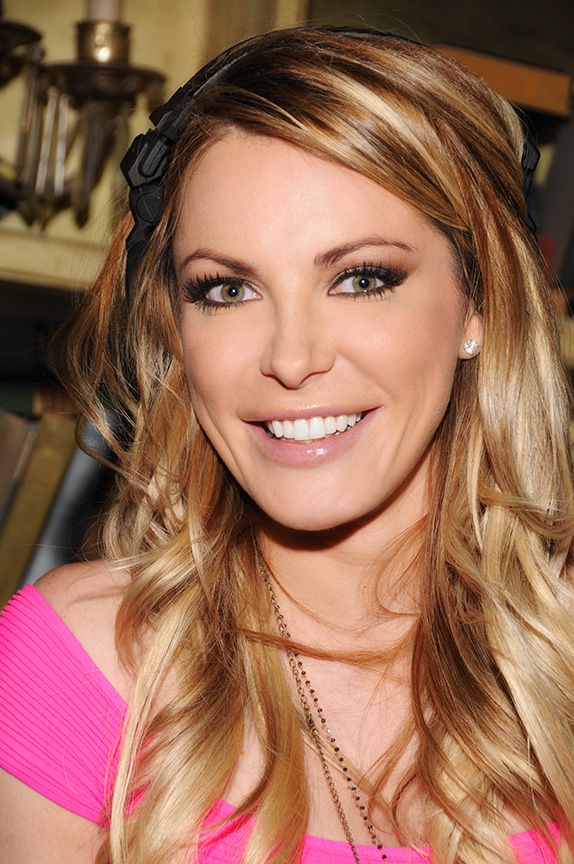
- Hefner in 2014
- Born: Crystal Harris; April 29, 1986 (age 40)
- Education: San Diego State University
- Occupations: Model and television personality
- Known for: The Girls Next Door; Playboy Playmate of the Month for December 2009
- Height: 5 ft 6 in (1.68 m)
- Spouses: Hugh Hefner (m. 2012; died 2017); James Ward (m. 2026)
- Website: www.crystalhefner.com

Crystal Hefner (née Harris; born April 29, 1986) is an American model who was the Playboy Playmate of the Month for December 2009, and the third wife of Playboy publisher Hugh Hefner from December 2012 until his death in September 2017.

== Early life and education ==
Crystal Harris was born in 1986. Her father, Ray Harris, was a singer and songwriter. She majored in psychology at San Diego State University.

== Career ==
Harris appeared as "Co-ed of the Week" on Playboy.com during the week of October 30, 2008. Beginning in late 2009, she appeared in one of the seasons of E!'s The Girls Next Door reality show.

In April 2010, Harris signed a recording contract with Organica Music Group, a division of Universal Music Group, managed by record producer Michael Blakey.

In 2012, Harris co-designed a range of swimwear with Australian designer and owner of Véve Glamour Swimwear, Vanessa Bryce. In 2014, she announced a line of "intimates, athleisure and loungewear" that was co-designed with Rhonda Shear to be sold through her website. In 2024, the New York Times reported that she buys and sells rental properties for a living.

In 2024, under the name Crystal Hefner, she wrote and released the memoir Only Say Good Things: Surviving Playboy and Finding Myself, an instant New York Times bestseller detailing the misogyny and objectification within the Playboy mansion. Its position on the list is marked with a dagger symbol (†), which indicates the Times believes the book has reached the list in a suspicious way, such as through bulk purchases.

== Personal life ==
In January 2009, Harris began dating Hugh Hefner, who was 60 years her senior. She joined the Shannon twins as one of Hefner's girlfriends after his previous "number one girlfriend", Holly Madison, had ended their seven-year relationship. On December 24, 2010, she became engaged to Hefner, to become his third wife. Harris broke off their engagement on June 14, 2011, five days before their planned wedding. In anticipation of the wedding, the July issue of Playboy, which reached store shelves and customers' homes within days of the wedding date, featured Harris on the cover and in a photo spread. The headline on the cover read "America's Princess, Introducing Mrs. Crystal Hefner." Hefner and Harris subsequently reconciled and married on December 31, 2012. She remained married to Hefner until his death on September 27, 2017. On April 25, 2025, she announced her engagement with James Ward. Hefner and Ward eloped in Aitutaki in the Cook Islands on April 2, 2026.

In 2016, Hefner announced on her social media outlets that she had been diagnosed with Lyme disease and toxic mold before finding her symptoms were also due to "breast implant illness". Hefner stated that she experienced "brain fog" and "chronic fatigue" due to the implants but had them removed, which alleviated some of the symptoms.

=== Allegations about relationship with Hugh Hefner ===
In the years following Hugh Hefner’s death, Hefner publicly spoke positively about their relationship. In 2017, she described him as a “kind and humble soul” and said that he had changed and saved her life and made her feel loved every day. In 2020, on the third anniversary of his death, she called him her “greatest ally”, credited him with teaching her kindness, and said that he had made her feel “extremely important and adored” during their ten years together.

In 2020, Hefner claimed she almost died due to a fat transfer procedure considered to be plastic surgery. Her memoir, Only Say Good Things: Surviving Playboy and Finding Myself, a tell-all memoir about her experiences at the Playboy Mansion and with Hugh Hefner, was published in January 2024. She backed allegations which surfaced in recent time that the Playboy Mansion was a toxic environment filled with sexual abuse. She claimed she was "imprisoned" during her time at the mansion. In an interview with The Guardian, she claimed that "Hef was on the extreme side of narcissism," and that "I had to play mind games to survive."

Dasha Astafieva	Jessica Burciaga	Jennifer Pershing	Hope Dworaczyk	Crystal McCahill	Candice Cassidy
Karissa Shannon	Kristina Shannon	Kimberly Phillips	Lindsey Gayle Evans	Kelley Thompson	Crystal Harris
