= Hank Baskett =

American football player (born 1982)

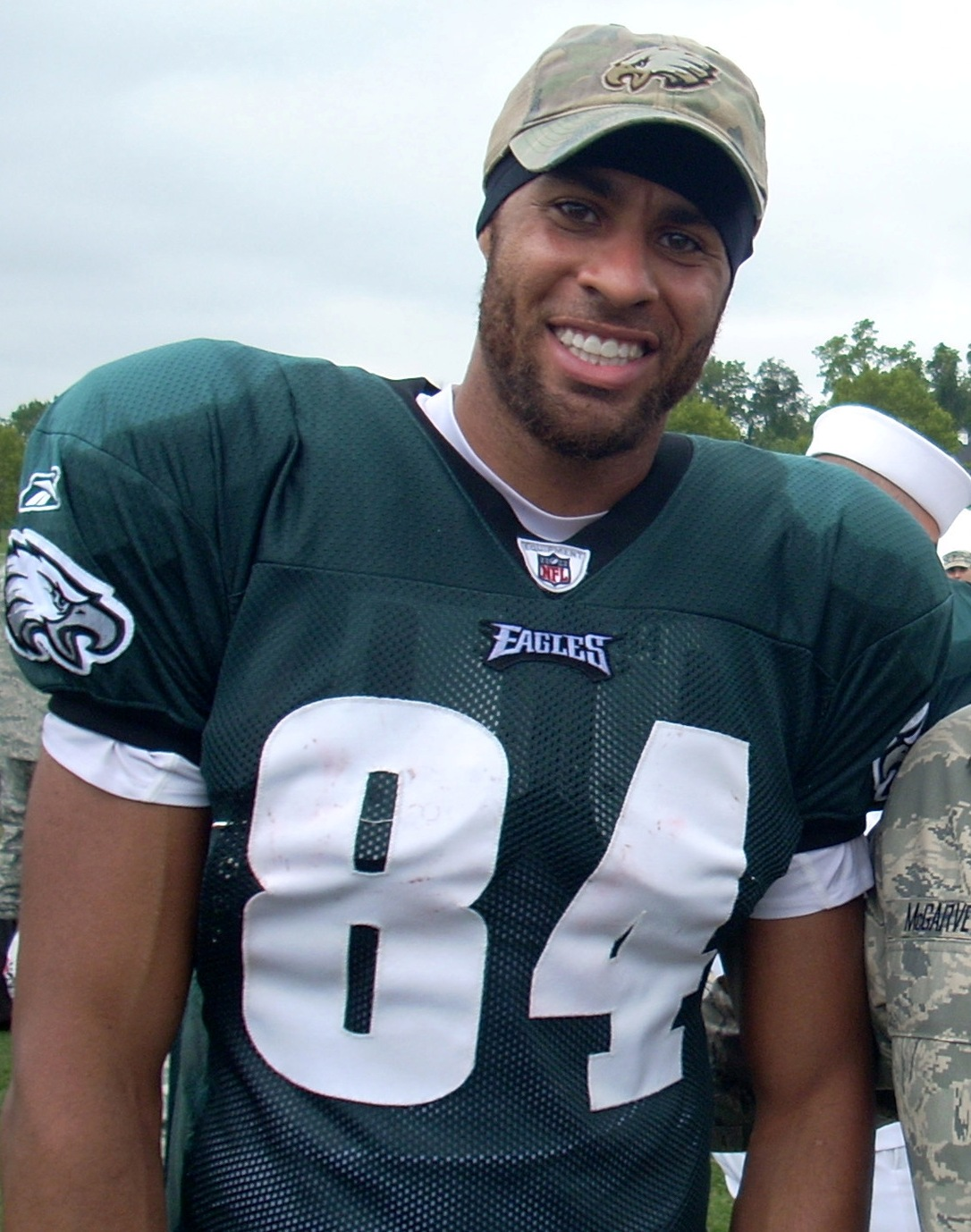
- Baskett with the Philadelphia Eagles in 2010

No. 84, 81, 19
- Position: Wide receiver

Personal information
- Born: September 4, 1982 (age 44); Clovis, New Mexico, U.S.
- Listed height: 6 ft 4 in (1.93 m)
- Listed weight: 220 lb (100 kg)

Career information
- High school: Clovis (NM)
- College: New Mexico (2001–2005)
- NFL draft: 2006: undrafted

Career history
- Minnesota Vikings (2006)*; Philadelphia Eagles (2006–2009); Indianapolis Colts (2009); Philadelphia Eagles (2010); Minnesota Vikings (2010)
- * Offseason or practice squad member only

Awards and highlights
- First-team All-MW (2005); Reese Leroy Hill Memorial Award

Career NFL statistics
- Receptions: 77
- Receiving yards: 1,098
- Receiving average: 14.3
- Receiving touchdowns: 6
- Stats at Pro Football Reference

Henry Randall Baskett III (born September 4, 1982) is an American former professional football player who was a wide receiver in the National Football League (NFL) for the Minnesota Vikings, Philadelphia Eagles, and Indianapolis Colts.

A native of Clovis, New Mexico, Baskett played college football for the University of New Mexico. As a college football player, Baskett was a leading wide receiver and earned all-academic honors all his years at New Mexico and All-Mountain West Conference honors in his senior season.

In 2006, Baskett signed with the Vikings as a rookie undrafted free agent and was traded that season to the Eagles. Baskett completed his rookie season with the Eagles with 22 receptions for an average of 20.1 yards per catch and two touchdowns. In 2009, Baskett joined the Colts. He returned to the Eagles in 2010, but was released and signed with the Vikings.

Baskett married Playboy model Kendra Wilkinson in 2009. Wilkinson and Baskett were co-stars on Kendra, a reality TV series following Wilkinson's life from 2009 to 2011. They subsequently co-starred on WEtv's Kendra on Top from 2012 until 2017.

== Early life ==
Baskett was born in Clovis, New Mexico. Baskett's parents are Henry Randall "Hank" Baskett Jr., who worked for the Air Force before becoming director of a social service program, and Judy Baskett, who works as a financial officer at Cannon Air Force Base in Clovis. He attended Clovis High School.

== College career ==
When Baskett attended the University of New Mexico, he was its football team's leading receiver in 2004 and 2005, earning him the Reese Leroy Hill Memorial Award as the team's Offensive Player of the Year during those years. Additionally, he earned All-Mountain West Conference (MWC) honors as a senior, posting 67 receptions for 1,071 yards and nine touchdowns. A four-time all-academic MWC honoree, he graduated with a degree in General Management.

== Professional career ==
Pre-draft measurables
Height	Weight	Arm length	Hand span	40-yard dash	10-yard split	20-yard split	20-yard shuttle	Three-cone drill	Vertical jump	Broad jump
6 ft 2 7/8 in (1.90 m)	224 lb (102 kg)	32 3/4 in (0.83 m)	9 1/8 in (0.23 m)	4.49 s	1.55 s	2.64 s	4.17 s	6.79 s	35.0 in (0.89 m)	9 ft 11 in (3.02 m)
All values from NFL Combine

=== Minnesota Vikings (first stint) ===
Baskett originally signed with the Minnesota Vikings as a rookie undrafted free agent in 2006 and was traded to the Philadelphia Eagles in exchange for wide receiver Billy McMullen.

=== Philadelphia Eagles (first stint) ===
Baskett had 112 receiving yards and one touchdown against the Dallas Cowboys and 177 receiving yards and one touchdown against the Atlanta Falcons. For his performance in these games, Baskett was awarded rookie of the week honors. He completed his rookie season with 22 receptions for 464 yards (21.1 yards per catch) and two touchdowns. He was named the 2007 special teams Most Valuable Player (MVP). In 2008, he started another six games, playing in 16 to record 33 receptions, 440 yards, and three touchdowns for a 13.3-yard average.

He headed into the 2009 offseason as a restricted free agent. He was tendered a one-year contract on February 23. Because the Eagles had been carrying seven wide receivers, he was made expendable and released on September 15, 2009, to make room for Michael Vick on the 53-man roster.

=== Indianapolis Colts ===
On September 17, 2009, Baskett signed a one-year contract with the Indianapolis Colts after Anthony Gonzalez suffered a knee injury. On February 7, 2010, during Super Bowl XLIV versus the New Orleans Saints, Baskett failed to recover an onside kick (that hit him in the hands) at the start of the second half, which led to a Saints touchdown. New Orleans won the game, 31–17.

=== Philadelphia Eagles (second stint) ===
On March 12, 2010, Baskett signed a one-year contract with the Eagles for $800,000. He was released on September 21, 2010.

=== Minnesota Vikings (second stint) ===
On September 22, 2010, Baskett re-signed with the Vikings. He played in eight games in 2010, mostly on special teams, with one reception. On March 3, 2011, he was not extended a tender by the Vikings, making him an unrestricted free agent, but effectively ending his NFL career.

=== NFL statistics ===
Year	Team	Games	Receptions	Targets	Yards	Yards per Reception	Longest Reception	Touchdowns	First Downs	Fumbles	Fumbles Lost	Onside Kick Recoveries
2006	PHI	16	22	42	464	21.1	89	2	17	0	0	0
2007	PHI	16	16	22	142	8.9	25	1	5	0	0	0
2008	PHI	15	33	52	440	13.3	90	3	22	1	0	0
2009	PHI	1	1	2	6	6.0	6	0	0	0	0	0
2009	IND	11	4	10	28	7.0	9	0	1	0	0	0
2010	MIN	6	1	4	18	18.0	18	0	1	0	0	0
Career		65	77	132	1,098	14.3	90	6	46	1	0	0

== Reality television ==
Baskett co-stars in a spinoff of The Girls Next Door, titled Kendra, which focuses on his wife Kendra Wilkinson's life after leaving the Playboy Mansion. The Girls Next Door executive producer Kevin Burns serves in the same capacity on the series. The show premiered on June 7, 2009, and had record-breaking numbers for E! with 2.6 million viewers, the highest-rated reality debut for the network since 2002's premiere of The Anna Nicole Show. E! ordered eight episodes. Season 2 ran from March 14 until June 8, 2010. The show was renewed once more, and the third season began airing in November 2010. The fourth season of the show premiered September 2011. The show has ended its run on E! and has now become Kendra on Top which began airing on WE tv on Tuesday, June 5, 2012. Season 2 ran from September to November 2013 and season 3 ran from October to November 2014.

== Personal life ==
Baskett proposed to his girlfriend, former Playboy model Kendra Wilkinson, on top of the Space Needle after dating for six months. The couple married on June 27, 2009, at the Playboy Mansion. Baskett and Wilkinson have a son, Henry Randall "Hank" Baskett IV (born December 11, 2009) and daughter, Alijah Mary Baskett (born May 16, 2014). In 2014, reports surfaced of Baskett having an affair while Wilkinson was eight months pregnant with their daughter. The couple divorced in 2018.

Baskett resides in Voorhees Township, New Jersey.

== In popular culture ==
In the novel, The Silver Linings Playbook by Matthew Quick, central character Pat Peoples was given Baskett's Philadelphia Eagles number 84 jersey as a present. Over the 2006–07 season, Baskett became Peoples's favorite player and, for Christmas, he received an autographed picture of Baskett.
