= Jayde Nicole =

Canadian model and businesswoman (born 1986)

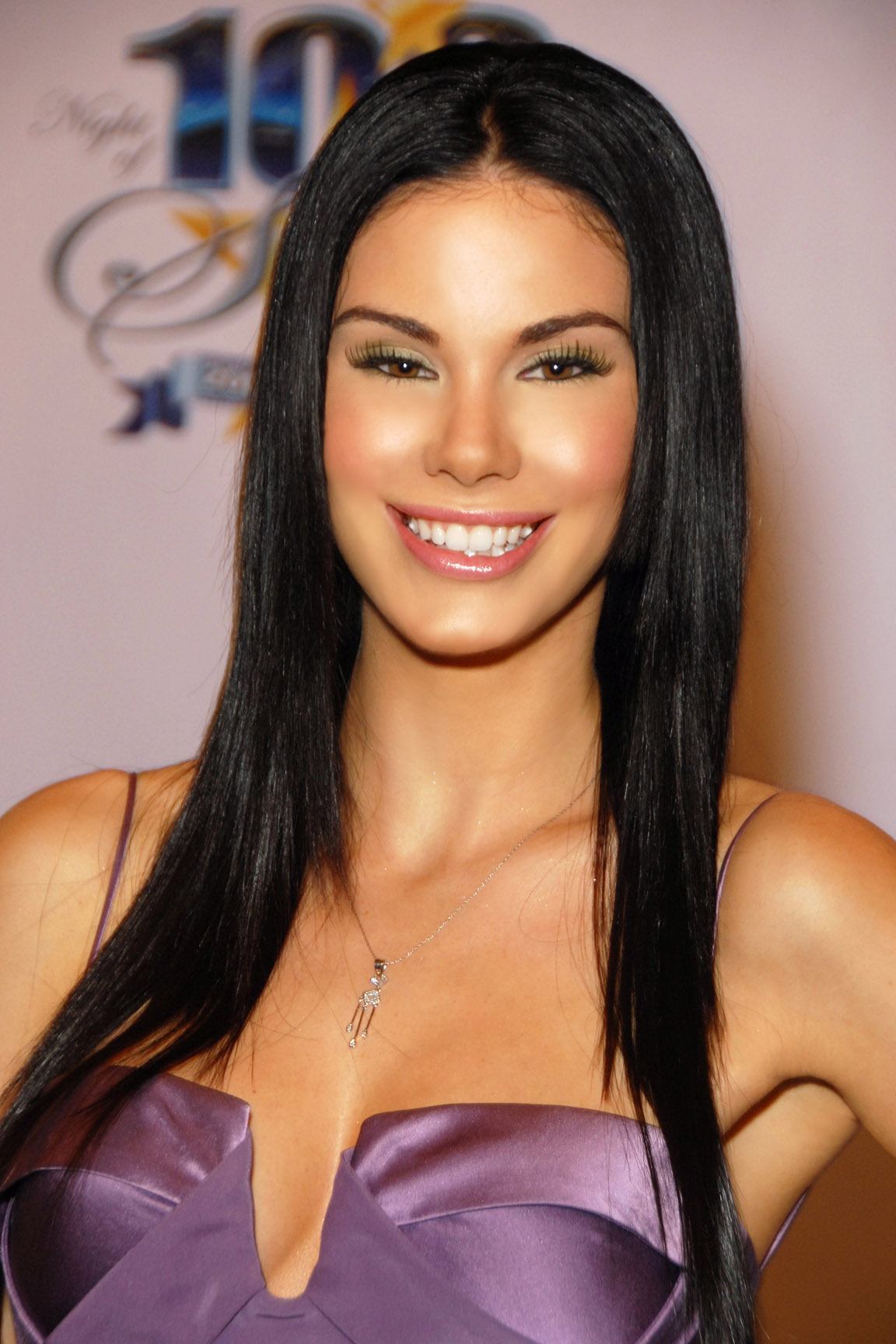
- Nicole attending the "Night of 100 Stars" for the 82nd Academy Awards viewing party at the Beverly Hills Hotel, Beverly Hills, CA on March 7, 2010

Playboy centerfold appearance
- January 2007
- Preceded by: Kia Drayton
- Succeeded by: Heather Rene Smith

Playboy Playmate of the Year
- 2008
- Preceded by: Sara Jean Underwood
- Succeeded by: Ida Ljungqvist

Personal details
- Born: Jayde Nicole Gelette-Ivany; February 19, 1986 (age 40) Scarborough, Ontario, Canada
- Height: 5 ft 9 in (1.75 m)
- [jaydenicole.com Official website]

Jayde Nicole (born February 19, 1986) is a Canadian model and businesswoman. She was Playboy′s Playmate of the Month for January 2007 and was named Playmate of the Year in 2008. She is the first Canadian Playmate of the Year in 26 years, and the third overall, the previous two being Dorothy Stratten, 1980's Playmate of the Year and Shannon Tweed, 1982's Playmate of the Year.

== Early life ==
Nicole began modeling for catalogs and fashion shows at the age of six. The following year, Nicole's family moved from Scarborough to Port Perry. When she turned 11, she stopped modeling for a time, as she was finding herself becoming "too mature to be doing kid's jobs."

When she was 15, a scout from a Toronto modeling agency spotted her outside the Air Canada Centre as she was leaving a concert and offered her an opportunity to return to modeling. Since then, Nicole has appeared in numerous publications and fashion shows. She created and owns her own agency, "A Touch of Class", based in Port Perry.

Nicole graduated from Port Perry High School and then studied hotel management at George Brown College in Toronto, but dropped out to pursue a modeling career. Her mother handed Nicole her first issue of Playboy and suggested she pose for the magazine.

== Career ==
Nicole was Playboy's Playmate of the Month in January 2007, and was named the 2008 Playmate of the Year.

In October 2008, Nicole appeared in a presidential election spoof video for FunnyorDie.com. The video, "Playmates Heat Up the Presidential Debate", also features fellow Playboy models Jo García, Grace Kim, and Christine Smith. Footage was taken from the Presidential town hall debate which took place October 7, 2008, and digitally altered to show the women asking Senators Obama and McCain a series of questions.

Nicole debuted as a feature-film actress in the 2009 Italian comedy Un'estate ai Caraibi. In October 2009, Nicole appeared on Fox Sports' PokerStars Million Dollar Challenge.

In the September 2010 edition of Guitar World magazine Nicole appeared as one of "The Girls of the 2011 Guitar World Buyer's Guide".

Nicole co-owns a vegan Mexican restaurant with fellow Playboy veteran Jessica Hall in Los Angeles, California called Sugar Taco.

=== Reality television ===
Nicole filmed a pilot for E!, The Girls Next Door: The Bunny House, with several other Playboy centerfolds. She appeared for several episodes during the second season in fellow Playboy alum Holly Madison's reality show, Holly's World. While dating Brody Jenner, Jayde appeared on several episodes of The Hills on MTV.

== Personal life ==
Nicole started a charity called Lengths for Love, similar to Locks of Love, which encourages people to donate their hair to be fashioned into wigs for pediatric patients in need. She has posed in a lettuce bikini on behalf of PETA, encouraging people to become vegan.

== See also ==
- List of people in Playboy 2000–2009

Jayde Nicole	Heather Rene Smith	Tyran Richard	Giuliana Marino	Shannon James	Brittany Binger
Tiffany Selby	Tamara Sky	Patrice Hollis	Spencer Scott	Lindsay Wagner	Sasckya Porto
