= Kendra on Top =

American reality television series

- Genre: Reality
- Starring: Kendra Baskett; Hank Baskett
- Country of origin: United States
- Original language: English
- No. of seasons: 6
- No. of episodes: 92

Production
- Executive producers: Kevin Burns; Rachel Tung; Kim Sheerin; Kendra Wilkinson-Baskett; Hank Baskett; Suzanne Gladstone
- Running time: 22 minutes
- Production company: Prometheus Entertainment

Original release
- Network: WE tv
- Release: June 5, 2012 – August 18, 2017

Related
- Kendra

Kendra on Top is an American reality television series on WE tv that debuted June 5, 2012. The series follows the day-to-day life of former Playboy model and The Girls Next Door reality television personality Kendra Baskett as she balances motherhood and her business ventures. Season 2 chronicles Wilkinson as she prepares and participates as a celebrity contestant on Splash and stars on Celebrity Wife Swap. The series also documents the activities of her husband, Hank Baskett, as he works on his transition from NFL football player to businessman. Kendra's car accident that occurred in April 2013 is also included.

The show ran for six seasons until 2017.

== Production ==
From June 2009 through November 2011, Kendra Wilkinson starred on Kendra, a reality series that aired on E!. Upon the conclusion of the series' fourth season, the network and Wilkinson parted ways as the network "went in a different direction" with its programming. In March 2012, WE tv confirmed that the network had ordered fourteen episodes of Kendra on Top. Production began later that month. On October 22, 2012, AMC Networks, the owners of WE tv, announced that the series has been renewed for a second season. Along with the renewal, it was revealed that the first season acquired 7.5 million total viewers. Season 2 premiered on September 13, 2013. As with the first season, it is bookended by hour-long premiere and finale episodes.

== Cast ==
=== Main ===
- Kendra Wilkinson
- Hank Baskett, Kendra's husband
- Hank Baskett IV, Kendra and Hank's son
- Alijah Mary Baskett, Kendra and Hank's daughter

=== Recurring ===
- Bethany Coffee, Kendra's friend
- Jessica Hall, Kendra's friend
- Travelle Gaines, Hank's friend
- Patti Wilkinson, Kendra's mother
- Eric Wilkinson, Kendra's father
- Colin Wilkinson, Kendra's brother
- Amy Wilkinson, Eric's wife
- Jai Rodriguez, Kendra's friend and vegas co-star

=== Guest ===
- Caitlyn Jenner – Season 2, episode 9: "Truce or Dare"
- Jimmy Bullard – Season 4, episode 1: "A Hard Night's Day"
- Kaye Adams – Season 4, episode 1: "A Hard Night's Day"
- Coleen Nolan – Season 4, episode 1: "A Hard Night's Day"
- Jamelia – Season 4, episode 1: "A Hard Night's Day"
- Janet Street-Porter – Season 4, episode 1: "A Hard Night's Day"
- Gemma Collins – Season 4, episode 1: "A Hard Night's Day"
- Jake Quickenden – Season 4, episode 2: "A London Bridge Too Far"
- Matt Edmondson – Season 4, episode 2: "A London Bridge Too Far"
- Stephen Mulhern – Season 4, episode 3: "Homeward Boundage"
- Alex Brooker – Season 4, episode 3: "Homeward Boundage"
- James Anderson – Season 4, episode 3: "Homeward Boundage"
- Jenni "JWoww" Farley – Season 4, episode 6: "Assistant Living"
- Jaleel White – Season 4, episode 6: "Assistant Living"
- Barry Williams – Season 4, episode 6: "Assistant Living"
- Dean Cain – Season 4, episode 6: "Assistant Living"
- Chris Soules – Season 4, episode 6: "Assistant Living"
- Rachael Ray – Season 4, episode 8: "Thirsty Is the New Kendra"
- Anne Burrell – Season 4, episode 8: "Thirsty Is the New Kendra"
- Jayde Nicole – Season 5, episode 1: "Return of the Jayde-Eye"
- Louis Vito – Season 5, episode 2: "Snowblinded"
- Bridget Marquardt – Season 5, episode 12: "A Bridget Too Far"

== Episodes ==
=== Series overview ===
Season	Episodes	Originally released	
Season	Episodes	First released	Last released
1	14	June 5, 2012	July 31, 2012
2	14	September 13, 2013	November 1, 2013
3	14	October 3, 2014	November 21, 2014
4	18	August 21, 2015	October 30, 2015
5	16	April 1, 2016	May 20, 2016
6	16	June 23, 2017	August 18, 2017

=== Season 1 (2012) ===
No. overall	No. in season	Title	Original release date
1	1	"Workin' It"	June 5, 2012
2	2	"Batteries Not Included"	June 12, 2012
3	3	"Guess Who's Coming to Calabasas?"	June 12, 2012
4	4	"Kendra Takes Miami"	June 19, 2012
5	5	"Kendra Goes Back to School"	June 19, 2012
6	6	"A Star Is Born"	June 26, 2012
7	7	"Fore Play"	July 3, 2012
8	8	"New York Kendra"	July 10, 2012
9	9	"The Empire Statement"	July 10, 2012
10	10	"Nashville or Bust"	July 17, 2012
11	11	"LoCash Kendra"	July 17, 2012
12	12	"Risque Business"	July 24, 2012
13	13	"Homeward Rebound"	July 24, 2012
14	14	"Picture Perfect"	July 31, 2012

=== Season 2 (2013) ===
No. overall	No. in season	Title	Original release date
15	1	"Trick or Tweet"	September 13, 2013
16	2	"Dangerous When Wet"	September 20, 2013
17	3	"The Ex Files"	September 20, 2013
18	4	"Crash Course"	September 27, 2013
19	5	"Mum Mum's the Word"	September 27, 2013
20	6	"Miami Vices"	October 4, 2013
21	7	"Homeland Insecurity"	October 4, 2013
22	8	"The Cold Wars"	October 11, 2013
23	9	"Truce or Dare"	October 11, 2013
24	10	"The Big Bare"	October 18, 2013
25	11	"Cabin Fever"	October 18, 2013
26	12	"The Confidence Game"	October 25, 2013
27	13	"Pulling the Goalie"	October 25, 2013
28	14	"High Wired"	November 1, 2013

=== Season 3 (2014) ===
No. overall	No. in season	Title	Original release date
29	1	"Spilled Milk"	October 3, 2014
30	2	"Cutting the Cord"	October 10, 2014
31	3	"Damage Control"	October 10, 2014
32	4	"No Beef Patti"	October 17, 2014
33	5	"Girls' Night Bout"	October 17, 2014
34	6	"Game Over"	October 24, 2014
35	7	"The Moment of Truce"	October 24, 2014
36	8	"Where's Poppa"	October 31, 2014
37	9	"Apartmentalized"	October 31, 2014
38	10	"Make Room for Daddy"	November 7, 2014
39	11	"Paradise Lost and Found"	November 7, 2014
40	12	"Sons of Beaches"	November 14, 2014
41	13	"The Son-in-Law Also Rises"	November 14, 2014
42	14	"The Missing Peace"	November 21, 2014

=== Season 4 (2015) ===
No. overall	No. in season	Title	Original release date
43	1	"A Hard Night's Day"	August 21, 2015
44	2	"A London Bridge Too Far"	August 28, 2015
45	3	"Homeward Boundage"	September 4, 2015
46	4	"Catty Shack"	September 11, 2015
47	5	"Family Matters"	September 11, 2015
48	6	"Assistant Living"	September 18, 2015
49	7	"Travails with My Aunt"	September 18, 2015
50	8	"Thirsty Is the New Kendra"	September 25, 2015
51	9	"Payback Is a Holly"	September 25, 2015
52	10	"Close Encounters of the Hank Kind"	October 2, 2015
53	11	"The Sexorcist"	October 2, 2015
54	12	"Dots Amore"	October 9, 2015
55	13	"Tantric or Treat"	October 9, 2015
56	14	"Breast Intentions"	October 16, 2015
57	15	"Midsummer's Night Mare"	October 16, 2015
58	16	"Kendra's Time Out"	October 23, 2015
59	17	"Hankless in Seattle"	October 23, 2015
60	18	"Last Rites"	October 30, 2015

=== Season 5 (2016) ===
No. overall	No. in season	Title	Original release date
61	1	"Return of the Jayde-Eye"	April 1, 2016
62	2	"Snowblinded"	April 1, 2016
63	3	"Where's the Beef?"	April 8, 2016
64	4	"Facing the Music"	April 8, 2016
65	5	"The Birthday Presence"	April 15, 2016
66	6	"Out of Tune"	April 15, 2016
67	7	"Kendra Down Under"	April 22, 2016
68	8	"Melbourne to Be Wild"	April 22, 2016
69	9	"Close Quarters"	April 29, 2016
70	10	"Reunion"	April 29, 2016
71	11	"Meat the Parents"	May 6, 2016
72	12	"A Bridget Too Far"	May 6, 2016
73	13	"Girls Gone Amy"	May 13, 2016
74	14	"Parting Gifts"	May 13, 2016
75	15	"Lust in Space"	May 20, 2016
76	16	"Home Runs"	May 20, 2016

=== Season 6 (2017) ===
No. overall	No. in season	Title	Original release date
77	1	"I Dismember Mama"	June 23, 2017
78	2	"Publisher Perish"	June 30, 2017
79	3	"Unhappy Birthday"	June 30, 2017
80	4	"Terms of Endangerment"	July 7, 2017
81	5	"Sex Tips and the City"	July 7, 2017
82	6	"Patti Meltdown"	July 14, 2017
83	7	"Truce or Dare"	July 14, 2017
84	8	"Forgive and Regret"	July 21, 2017
85	9	"The Last Temptation of Patti"	July 21, 2017
86	10	"As the Page Turns"	July 28, 2017
87	11	"Frenemy Mine"	July 28, 2017
88	12	"Be Careful What You Wish For"	August 4, 2017
89	13	"Playdates"	August 4, 2017
90	14	"Papa Don't Preach"	August 11, 2017
91	15	"Undressed Rehearsal"	August 11, 2017
92	16	"The Parent Trapped"	August 18, 2017
