= Ida Ljungqvist =

Swedish-Tanzanian model (born 1981)

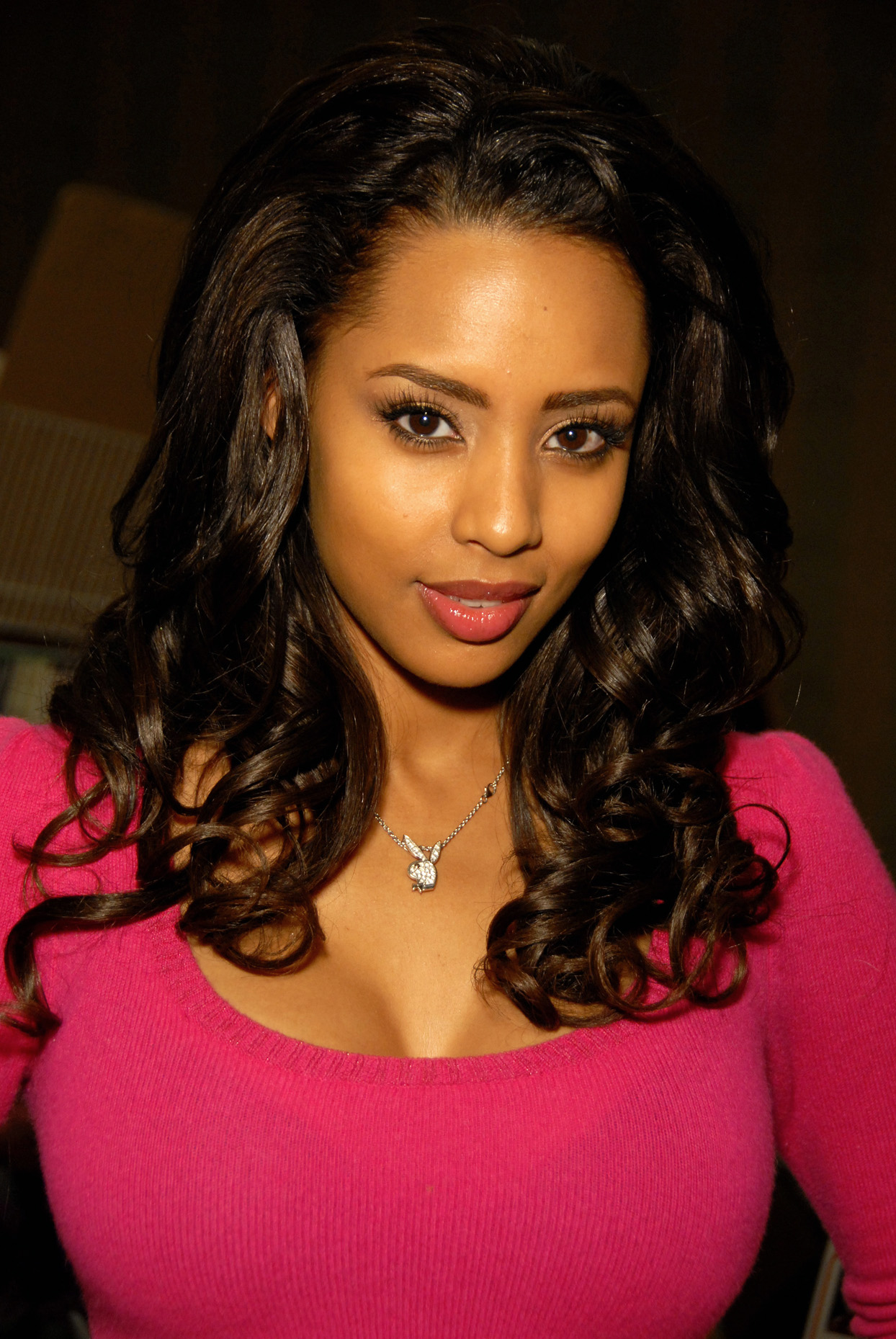
- Ljungqvist in 2010

Playboy centerfold appearance
- March 2008
- Preceded by: Michelle McLaughlin
- Succeeded by: Regina Deutinger

Playboy Playmate of the Year
- 2009
- Preceded by: Jayde Nicole
- Succeeded by: Hope Dworaczyk

Personal details
- Born: 27 September 1981 (age 45) Tanzania
- Height: 5 ft 4 in (1.63 m)

Ida Ljungqvist (born September 27, 1981) is a Tanzanian-Swedish model and the first African-born person to be selected as a Playmate of the Month and the 50th Playmate of the Year. She was named Playmate of the Year in 2009.

== Career ==
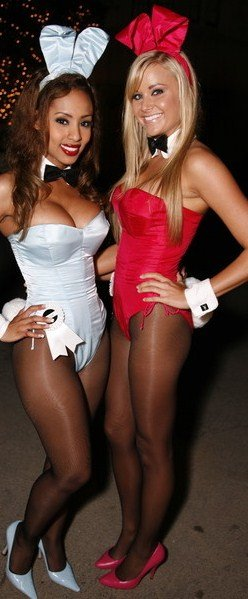
Ljungqvist at Playboy Event with Kara Monaco

She was discovered by 2007 Playmate of the Year Sara Jean Underwood at a bebe store on Rodeo Drive in Beverly Hills, California. She was named Playboy's Playmate of the Month for March 2008 and the 2009 Playmate of the Year. She is the first African-born and second Swedish model to be named a Playmate of the Year. She is also the first Playmate of the Year to publicly dedicate her title to philanthropic work through non-profit charities and organizations. Ljungqvist co-hosted the Playboy New Year's Eve Party 2009 in Miami, Florida alongside several other playmates.

Since being named Playmate of the Year, Ljungqvist has worked with Empowerment Works, a non-profit, global sustainability think-tank. Her work includes raising awareness about the organization and fundraising.

== Personal life ==
Ljungqvist was born in Tanzania to a Tanzanian mother and a Swedish father. Due to her father's work for UNICEF, Ljungqvist traveled a great deal. She speaks English, Swedish, and Swahili. Ljungqvist has a degree in fashion design and marketing, and plans to study economics.

In December 2007, Ljungqvist married Joshua R. Lang. Lang filed for divorce in September 2008. In November 2008, MSNBC reported a custody struggle between them over their pet Chihuahua.

Sandra Nilsson	Michelle McLaughlin	Ida Ljungqvist	Regina Deutinger	A. J. Alexander	Juliette Fretté
Laura Croft	Kayla Collins	Valerie Mason	Kelly Carrington	Grace Kim	Jennifer and Natalie Jo Campbell
