= Playboy Studio West =

Coordinates: 34.028427°N 118.476590°W

Playboy Studio West is located at 2112 Broadway Avenue, Santa Monica, California. It is one of Playboy's key studio facilities for Playboy photographers to shoot centerfolds and Playmate pictorials. Many models had their test nude shoots taken at this facility prior to being considered for a Playmate pictorial in Playboy.

Its exterior and interior were shown in episodes of E! Reality television series The Girls Next Door throughout its run, as well as Keeping Up with the Kardashians, The Bad Girls Club and Meet the Barkers.

== See also ==
- Pompeo Posar
