= The Girls Next Door =

American reality television series

- Also known as: The Girls of the Playboy Mansion
- Created by: Kevin Burns; Hugh Hefner
- Starring: Hugh Hefner; Holly Madison (2005–09); Bridget Marquardt (2005–09); Kendra Wilkinson (2005–09); Crystal Harris (2009); Kristina Shannon (2009); Karissa Shannon (2009)
- Opening theme: "Come on-a My House" (remix)
- Ending theme: "Come on-a My House" (remix)
- Country of origin: United States
- Original language: English
- No. of seasons: 6
- No. of episodes: 91 (list of episodes)

Production
- Executive producer: Kevin Burns
- Production companies: Fox Television Studios; Alta Loma Entertainment; Prometheus Entertainment

Original release
- Network: E!
- Release: August 7, 2005 – August 8, 2010

Related
- Kendra; Holly's World; The Girls Next Door: The Bunny House; Bridget's Sexiest Beaches; Kendra on Top

The Girls Next Door (also known as The Girls of the Playboy Mansion) is a reality television series that focused on the lives of Hugh Hefner's girlfriends who lived with him at the Playboy Mansion. The series was created by executive producer Kevin Burns and Hefner, founder of Playboy magazine. The series premiered on the E! cable network on August 7, 2005, and ran for 6 seasons. The first five seasons centered around then-girlfriends, Holly Madison, Bridget Marquardt and Kendra Wilkinson. The sixth and final season premiered on October 11, 2009, and introduced Hefner's new girlfriends, Crystal Harris, who eventually went on to marry Hefner, and twins Kristina and Karissa Shannon.

The success of the series was followed by a few spin-offs, including Kendra and Holly's World.

== Synopsis ==
The series focused on the lives of Hugh Hefner's girlfriends who lived with him at the legendary Playboy Mansion in Los Angeles. Hefner was often on the show along with various Playmates and other celebrities. The series not only showcased events at the mansion (e.g. Fight Night, Fourth of July celebration, the Midsummer Night's Dream party), but also shed light on other Playboy related events such as the Playboy Jazz Festival at the Hollywood Bowl, Playmate test shoots at Playboy Studio West, Operation Playmate, birthday parties, and more significantly, the personalities and real lives of each of his girlfriends.

== Development and production ==
Kevin Burns approached Hefner in early 2005, which resulted in a pilot called "Hef's World" being filmed. This followed "Hef, his girlfriends, and friends contrasted with the staff". When presented to E!, they told him to go back and interview each of the girlfriends to "see what you can get", which resulted in the premise shifting from Hefner to life in the mansion from a woman's perspective.

=== Seasons 1–5 ===
The first five seasons centered around then-girlfriends, Holly Madison, Bridget Marquardt and Kendra Wilkinson.

In October 2008, Hefner's relationships with Madison ended for unconfirmed reasons (though the final episode of the fifth season discusses her unhappiness at the mansion in not being able to get married or have a family with Hefner) and Wilkinson left to continue her new relationship with football player Hank Baskett. Marquardt also temporarily left at the same time to film Bridget's Sexiest Beaches for The Travel Channel, but in January 2009 ended her relationship with Hefner and moved out of the mansion permanently.

=== Final season ===
Despite the end of Hefner's relationship with Madison, Marquardt and Wilkinson, all three were contractually committed to a sixth season. Madison indicated to Life & Style magazine, the manner in which their contractual obligations would be fulfilled was still unknown at the time, but that they were still filming material together. However, the focus of the show shifted to Hefner's new girlfriends, 23-year-old Crystal Harris, and 19-year-old twins Kristina and Karissa Shannon. The sixth season was also originally set to feature Anna Sophia Berglund and Melissa Taylor as Hefner's second and third girlfriends, with the Shannon twins relegated to fourth and fifth position – according to a post by the company responsible for the show's opening sequence, that shows an incomplete rough cut of the new intro for the show.

Madison did appear in the first two episodes of the season, and also appeared with Marquardt and Wilkinson in the episode "The Showering Inferno", which focused more on them than Harris and the twins.

== Episodes ==
Season	Episodes	Originally released	
Season	Episodes	First released	Last released
Pilot		2006 (on DVD)	
1	15	August 7, 2005	December 4, 2005
2	16	July 30, 2006	November 19, 2006
3	15	March 4, 2007	September 2, 2007
4	12	December 9, 2007	March 2, 2008
5	22	August 18, 2008	March 1, 2009
6	11	October 11, 2009	August 8, 2010

== Reception ==
The Girls Next Door was an instant hit for E! and quickly had its first season expanded from eight to fifteen episodes. The second-season premiere was watched by 1.6 million viewers (which set a 3-year record) and then topped itself by having 2.16 million viewers for the third-season premiere – the second highest season premiere ever on the E! network.

The initial success of the show was so great that Playboy published a nude pictorial of Madison, Marquardt and Wilkinson on the November 2005 issue. This later led to two more pictorials in September 2006 (to celebrate the premiere of the second season) and March 2008 (celebrating them being voted fourth in Playboy's annual "Sexiest Celebrities" online poll).

The final episode starring Madison, Marquardt and Wilkinson was watched by 2.535 million viewers.

Despite starting with the highest rating season premiere in the series' history, the sixth season saw ratings drop from 2.4 million watching the premiere, to only 960,000 watching the fourth episode only three weeks later. Ratings then dropped even further to 919,000 viewers only five weeks after the premiere.

== Home releases ==
20th Century Fox Home Entertainment released the first five seasons on DVD in Region 1 between 2006 and 2009. These releases have been discontinued and are now out-of-print.

In March 2011, it was announced that MPI Home Video had acquired the rights to the series. They subsequently released season 6 on DVD on July 19, 2011. They also re-released the first five seasons on the same day.

On November 29, 2011, MPI Home Video released The Girls Next Door: Complete Collection on DVD in Region 1. The 17-disc set features all 91 episodes of the series as well as many bonus features.

== Spin-offs ==
In 2008, Burns approached Wilkinson and offered her a series of her own. She later accepted and the series premiered on June 7, 2009. The series was a hit for E!, averaging 2.6 million viewers in its first season and setting many records – including being the highest-rated premiere since 2002.

In 2009, Burns revealed he was in talks to create two new series, one for Madison and one for Marquardt.

Holly's World premiered on December 6, 2009 as a backdoor pilot and later received an 8-episode first season that began airing on June 13, 2010.
Just Add Bridget filmed a pilot in April 2010, but wasn't picked up.

In 2010, a backdoor pilot focusing on the Playmate House, titled The Girls Next Door: The Bunny House, aired on August 8, 2010, but the series was not picked up.

In 2011, Holly's World was initially given a third season that was due to begin filming in September, however it was later confirmed the season had been canceled before the production had begun and that the series would not be returning. The cancellation came about in July when then-new E! president Bonnie Hammer vowed to "get rid of the more Playboy trashy element" from the network – a goal that was ultimately achieved as Kendra was also canceled in 2012.

In 2012, a new series titled Kendra on Top that would premiere on WE tv in the summer of 2012 was announced as a follow-up to Kendra. As with all other spin-offs, this show is also produced by Burns and his production company Prometheus Entertainment.
