= Jessica Hall (American actress) =

American actress

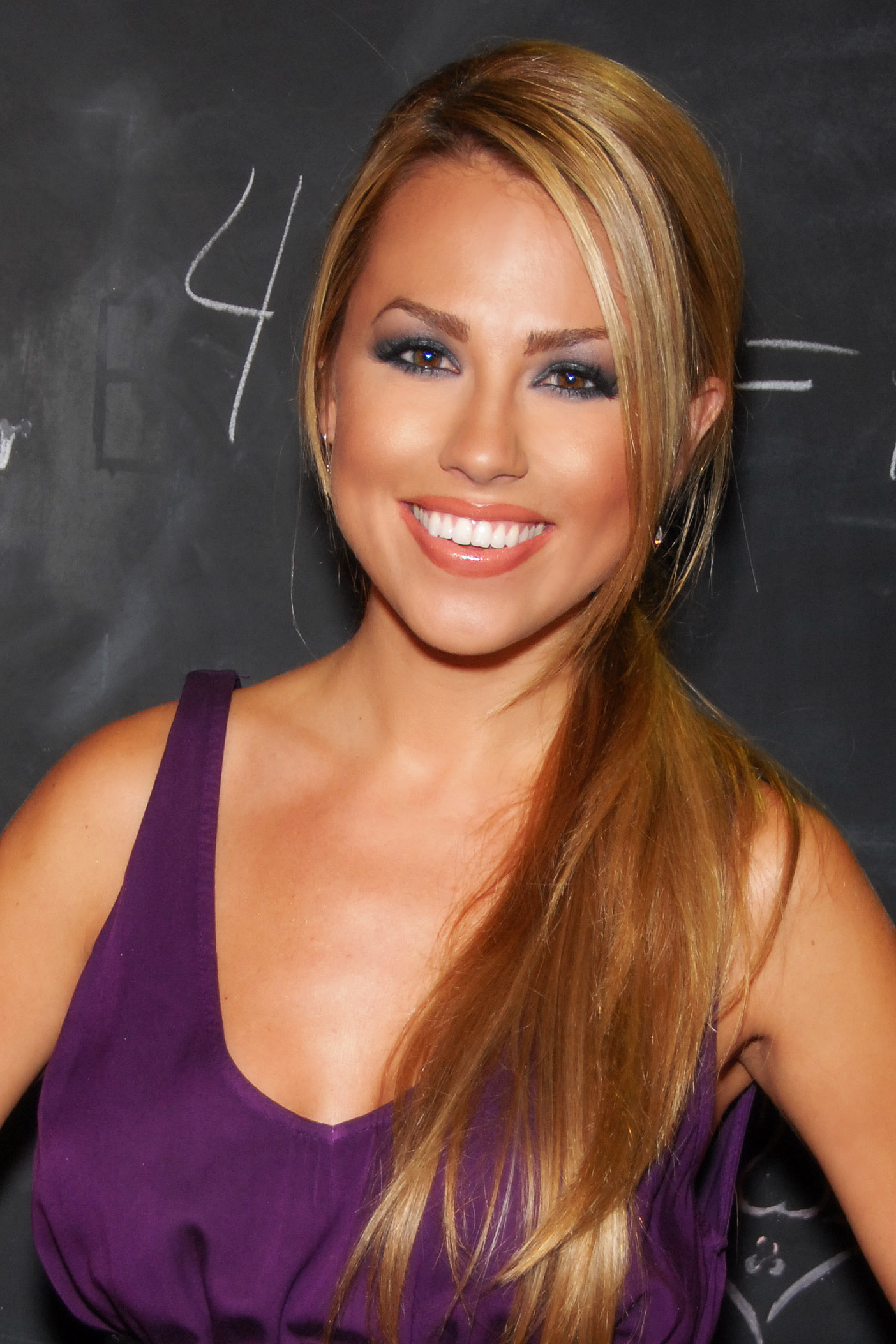
- Jessica Hall attending the Bench Warmer "Back-to-School" Party at Empire, Hollywood, CA on August 28, 2009
- Born: Jessica Danielle Hall; June 21, 1983 (age 42); Hawaii, U.S.
- Occupations: Actress, model, television personality
- Years active: 2003–present

Jessica Danielle Hall (born June 21, 1983) is an American actress, model, reality TV and radio personality who appears in the reality television show series Kendra on E!. She is the older sister of fellow reality TV personality Stacie Hall from MTV reality television series The Hills.

== Career ==
In 2003, Hall hosted the MTV reality series Burned. Later, in 2007 and 2008 Hall appeared in episodes of Deal or No Deal as a briefcase model and Get Out!, a travel/adventure TV show on HDNet. From October 2009 to January 2010, Hall served as Field Correspondent in the television series That Morning Show on E!. As of October 2009, Hall is co-hosting the new Playboy Radio show The Morning After. Jessica currently serves as the celebrity guest correspondent for TV Guide Channel's "Hollywood 411". Jessica is currently the host of Playboy's Happy Hour on Sirius/XM 102.

== Modeling ==
As simply "Jessica Danielle" she was Playboy's Cyber Girl of the Week for October 31, 2005. She was then later featured throughout the month of August 2007 in the Playboy Cyber Club's Cyber Girl Xtra feature. This was followed by a PCC exclusive pictorial under her full name in late 2009 after she joined Playboy Radio's The Morning After show. Then on August 2, 2010, she became the latest Playboy model to be featured at the Playboy Girls Network site Sexy Wives. In October 2010, Jessica appeared as a female version of Dr. Emmett "Doc" Brown with Playmate Kimberly Phillips as Marty McFly in exclusive pictorials and BTS video released at Playboy.com and the Playboy Cyber Club to honor the silver anniversary of the release of the original Back to the Future film. On January 7, 2011, two more picture sets (for a total of four) and another video (for a total of three) including an interview video were added to her Sexy Wives section on the Playboy Girls Network.

== Press ==
On July 27, 2010, Jessica Hall joined the likes of Kim Kardashian West, Carmen Electra and Mariah Carey in appearing on the cover of K9 Magazine.

Also for the August 2010 cover, Jessica Hall is featured on the cover of Rukus Magazine, along with 10 pages of editorial and pictorial.

Jessica Hall is the subject of the cover celebrity editorial for FG Magazine for their January/February 2011 issue. The issue also features interviews with Justin Timberlake and Max Ehrich.
