= Kristina and Karissa Shannon =

American Playboy playmates (born 1989/1990)

Playboy centerfold appearance
- July/August 2009
- Preceded by: Candice Cassidy
- Succeeded by: Kimberly Phillips

Personal details
- Born: 1989 or 1990 (age 36–37)

Kristina and Karissa Shannon (born 1989 or 1990) are American Playboy Playmates and identical twin sisters.

== Career ==
In 2008, the Shannons moved into the Playboy Mansion as two of Hugh Hefner's three new girlfriends; because of their relationship with Hefner, the Shannons began appearing on the E! network reality television series The Girls Next Door. Despite their "girlfriend" status, Karissa said the relationship she and Kristina shared with Hefner was more for fun and the opportunity to be on the show, rather than romance. The first episode they appeared in attracted 2.4 million viewers, making it the most-watched season premiere in the show's history; five weeks after the premiere, viewership had dropped to 919,000.

The Shannons appeared as Miss July and Miss August 2009 in the combined "summer issue" of Playboy magazine; the double issue was necessitated by financial problems at the publisher. Unlike previous centerfold twins, they managed to earn two consecutive months as Playmates, but shared a single centerfold. By January 2010, the Shannon twins moved out of the mansion, though they continued to appear in The Girls Next Door.

The twins had small roles in Somewhere, a film directed by Sofia Coppola which won top honors at the 67th Venice International Film Festival in 2010.

On January 5, 2012, the twins participated in the ninth series of the UK reality show, Celebrity Big Brother in which they came fifth. They also appeared on the companion series to the show, Big Brother's Bit on the Side.

== Personal lives ==
The twins were raised in Clearwater Beach, Florida and attended Largo High School for a time.

On August 31, 2026, Karissa announced that she is pregnant with her first child.

== Filmography ==
Year	Title	Role	Notes
2009	The Girls Next Door	Themselves	14 episodes
2010	Somewhere	Cindy and Bambi	
2012	Celebrity Big Brother	Themselves	5th place
2015	Botched	Themselves	
2015	Cocked (TV pilot)	Macy & Stacy	
2016	Rob & Chyna	Themselves	Guest appearance; Chyna's friends

Dasha Astafieva	Jessica Burciaga	Jennifer Pershing	Hope Dworaczyk	Crystal McCahill	Candice Cassidy
Karissa Shannon	Kristina Shannon	Kimberly Phillips	Lindsey Gayle Evans	Kelley Thompson	Crystal Harris
