= Bridget Marquardt =

American television personality (born 1973)

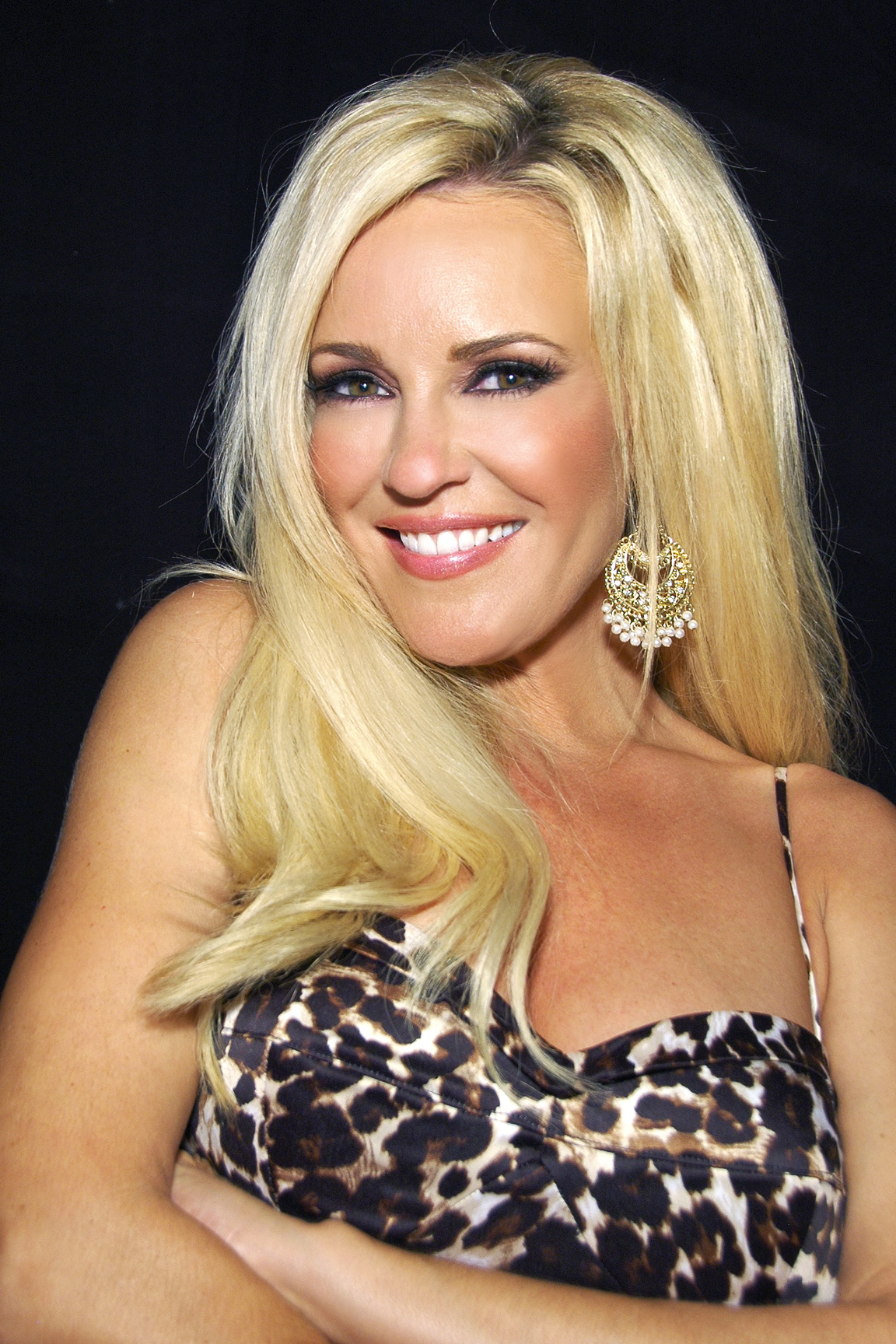
- Marquardt in September 2011
- Born: Bridget Christina Sandmeier; September 25, 1973 (age 53); Tillamook, Oregon, U.S.
- Education: San Joaquin Delta College (AA); California State University, Sacramento (BA); University of the Pacific (MA)
- Occupations: Television personality, actress, model
- Years active: 1998–present
- Spouse: Chad Marquardt (m. 1997; div. 2008)
- Partners: Hugh Hefner (2002–2009); Nicholas Carpenter (2009–present; engaged)

Bridget Marquardt (born Bridget Christina Sandmeier, September 25, 1973) is an American television personality, actress, model and podcast host, known for her role in the reality TV series The Girls Next Door, which depicted her life as one of Playboy founder Hugh Hefner's girlfriends. Marquardt has appeared in pictorials with her Girls Next Door co-stars and fellow Hefner girlfriends Holly Madison and Kendra Wilkinson.

== Early life ==
Marquardt was born in Tillamook, Oregon. Shortly after her birth, Bridget's mother moved the family back to California, where she was raised. Her parents divorced when Bridget was in the fifth grade. Her mother remarried, and Marquardt and her younger brother Edward moved to their stepfather's ranch, where they later gained a half-sister, Anastasia. Bridget attended Galt High School for her freshman and sophomore years and then transferred to Lodi High School, from which she graduated in 1990.

Marquardt graduated from San Joaquin Delta College with an associate degree. She matriculated at California State University, Sacramento and graduated in 1998 with a B.A. in communications and an emphasis in public relations. In 2001, she earned her Master's Degree in Communications from the University of the Pacific in Stockton, California.

== Career ==
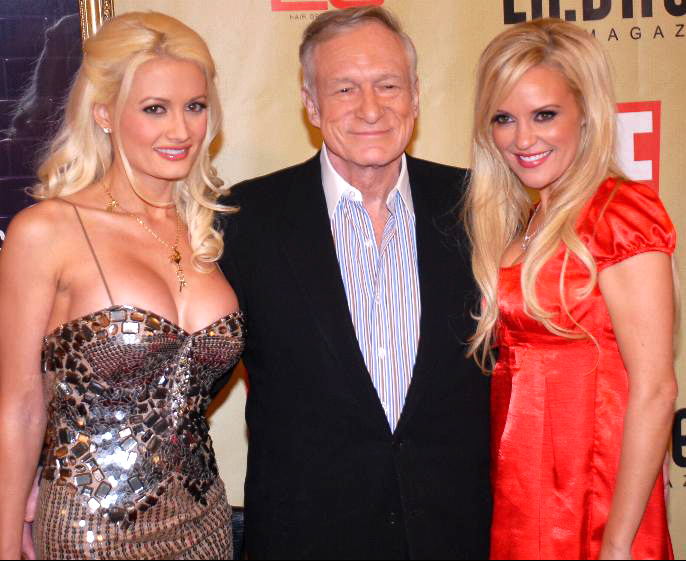
Marquardt (right) alongside Hugh Hefner and Holly Madison, 2007

On the advice of friends who suggested she pose for Playboy magazine, Marquardt sent a letter to Playboy, inquiring how to become a Playmate, before enrolling at San Joaquin Delta College. In 1998, aged 25, she entered Playboy's Millennium Playmate search. In 2001, Marquardt moved to Los Angeles, California and did local modeling jobs and small acting roles. After unsuccessfully testing twice for Playboy, she was invited to the Playboy Mansion and soon became a regular there. In October 2002, after more than a year of visiting the Mansion, she was invited to move in and become one of Hefner's girlfriends.

Marquardt is featured on the E! TV show The Girls Next Door, and has appeared with Holly Madison and Kendra Wilkinson in three cover pictorials in Playboy magazine, the November 2005, September 2006 and March 2008 issues. She has appeared in several films, including the horror/comedy Kottentail in which she portrays a scientist doing genetic research on rabbits. She appeared in an episode of Curb Your Enthusiasm as herself along with Madison and Hefner in 2005. She also appeared as herself along with Madison, Wilkinson and Hefner in the Entourage episode "Aquamansion". The episode's final act took place at the Playboy Mansion. She appeared in The House Bunny with her fellow models and Hefner alongside Anna Faris.

Marquardt appeared in a 2002 episode of The Man Show and as one of Hefner's playmates in the video game Playboy: The Mansion, which was released in January 2005, as well as in an episode of Celebrity Paranormal Project which aired on November 19, 2006. She took an online paranormal course because of her interest in paranormal activity. On June 1, 2007, she started her Bridget & Wednesday Friday Show on Sirius Radio's Playboy station. In August of that year, she, Madison and Wilkinson appeared in the music video for the Nickelback song "Rockstar". Later that October, Marquardt appeared as a contestant on the Fox Reality cable show The Search for the Next Elvira. She was one of the final six out of 20 contestants.

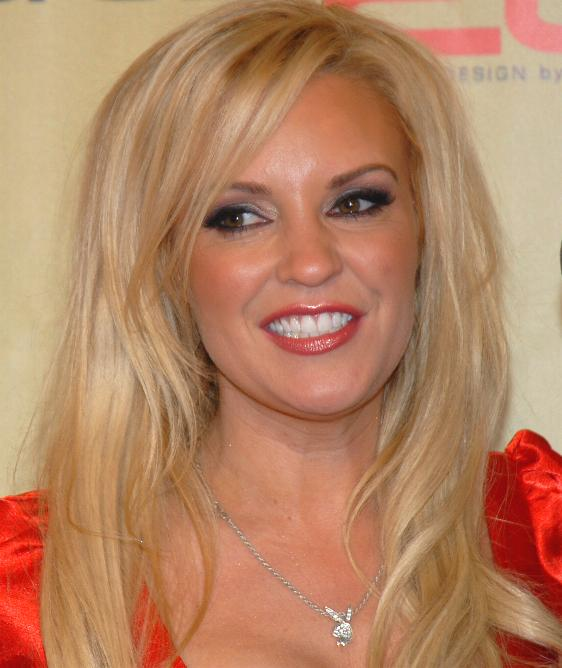
Marquardt at LA Direct magazine's "Remember to Give" Holiday Party in December 2007 in Hollywood

In 2008, Marquardt appeared on an episode of NBC's Last Comic Standing along with Wilkinson and Madison, in an episode in which the trio were told funny "bedtime stories" by the competing comics. Marquardt and the rest of the Girls Next Door appeared in a July 1, 2008 episode of NBC's Celebrity Family Feud.

February 2009 was Marquardt's final appearance in Playboy, in a nude photo spread shot with Madison and Wilkinson that was touted as a farewell to The Girls Next Door. After leaving Playboy, she hosted Bridget's Sexiest Beaches, a TV series on Travel Channel, which debuted on March 12, 2009, but ended after one season.

In 2012, she worked as a contributor to Yahoo's Animal Nation series, writing articles and shooting related short documentary pieces.

Marquardt hosts the paranormal investigation podcast Ghost Magnet with Bridget Marquardt and, with Holly Madison, Girls Next Level.

== Personal life ==
In the September 17, 2007 issue of Star magazine, Marquardt stated that she was married but separated and had been living in the Playboy mansion since October 2002. According to the interview, her husband supported her move to Los Angeles, that they remained friends, and that they were in the process of divorcing.

In 2008, Bridget told E! News, "I married my best friend when I was 23, but when I realized I wanted to move to LA to follow my dreams, we separated and eventually divorced." In a December 2008 interview, Marquardt stated that she was single, and in early January 2009, it was reported that Marquardt had moved out of the Playboy Mansion to "become her own person."

In late 2008, Marquardt began dating director Nicholas Carpenter, son of original Mercury astronaut Scott Carpenter. They started living together in a house Marquardt purchased in Sherman Oaks. The pair became engaged in the fall of 2015. As seen on various episodes of The Girls Next Door, Marquardt had a Pekingese dog named Wednesday, or "Winnie", and a black Persian cat named Gizmo. Gizmo died in June 2015. Winnie died in September 2020.

== Filmography ==
=== Films ===
Year	Title	Role	Notes
2003	Intolerable Cruelty	Santa Fe Tart	
2004	Kottentail	Scarlet Salenger	Straight-to-DVD
2006	Tomorrow's Yesterday	Crystal	
2006	Scary Movie 4	Herself	Cameo
2008	Black Friday	Maria Hillburg	
2008	The House Bunny	Herself	Minor role
2009	The Telling	Eva DeMarco	
2010	AppleBox	Mrs. Bronson	
2019	Weedjies! Halloweed Night	Party Guest	

=== Television ===
Year	Title	Role	Notes
2005	The Girls Next Door	Herself	Seasons 1–5; 79 episodes
2005	Curb Your Enthusiasm	Herself	Episode: "The Smoking Jacket"
2005	Entourage	Herself	Episode: "Aquamansion"
2006	Robot Chicken	Herself	Episode: "Drippy Pony"
2006	Celebrity Paranormal Project	Herself	Episode: "Tanner's Ghost"
2007	The Apprentice: Los Angeles	Herself	Episode: "Pink is the New Black"
2007	Identity	Herself	
2007	General Hospital	Herself	
2007	The Tyra Banks Show	Herself	
2007	The Ellen DeGeneres Show	Herself	
2007	The Search for the Next Elvira	Herself	
2007	Phenomenon	Herself	
2007	WWE Raw	Herself	
2008	Indyfans and the Quest for Fortune and Glory	Herself	
2008	Today	Herself	Episode dated June 24, 2008 (uncredited)
2008	Celebrity Family Feud	Herself	Vincent Pastore vs. The Girls Next Door, Kathie Lee Gifford vs. Dog the Bounty Hunter
2008	America United: In Support of Our Troops	Herself	
2008	Fox Reality Really Awards	Herself	
2009	Bridget's Sexiest Beaches	Herself	
2009	Kendra	Herself	
2010	Holly's World	Herself	
2011	Top Gear US	Herself	Season 2, episode 7
2011	Celebrity Ghost Stories	Herself	
2016	Kendra on Top	Herself	
2021	Ghost Adventures		Guest
2022	Secrets of Playboy	Herself	Docu-series; Episode 2: The Girl Next Door

=== Video games ===
Year	Title	Role	Notes
2011	Postal 3	Postal Babe	Voice
