= Kendra Wilkinson =

American television personality (born 1985/1986)

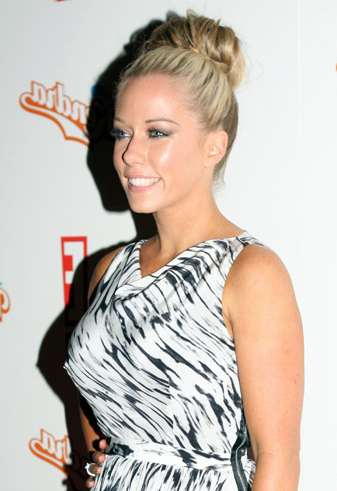
- Wilkinson in October 2011
- Born: Kendra Leigh Wilkinson; 1985 or 1986 (age 40–41); San Diego, California, U.S.
- Other name: Kendra Baskett
- Education: Clairemont High School
- Occupations: Television personality, real estate agent
- Years active: 2004–present
- Spouse: Hank Baskett (m. 2009; div. 2018)
- Partner: Hugh Hefner (2004–2008)
- Children: 2

Kendra Leigh Wilkinson (born 1985 or 1986) is an American television personality and real estate agent. She first gained recognition as one of Hugh Hefner's girlfriends and for her role on the E! reality television series The Girls Next Door (2005–2009), on which her life in the Playboy Mansion was documented. Although not a Playboy Playmate, she has appeared in three nude pictorials with her Girls Next Door co-stars Holly Madison and Bridget Marquardt. She subsequently starred in her own reality shows, Kendra (2009–2011) and Kendra on Top (2012–2017).

After a four-year break from television, Wilkinson had a career resurgence as a real estate agent and began starring in her own real estate-focused show, Kendra Sells Hollywood (2021–2023), which ran for two seasons.

== Early life ==
Wilkinson was born in San Diego, California. Wilkinson is of English, Irish, and Ukrainian descent. She has a younger brother named Colin. Her mother, Patti, was originally from Cherry Hill, New Jersey, and had been a cheerleader for the Philadelphia Eagles. Her father, Eric, was raised in Bryn Mawr, Pennsylvania and Ocean City, New Jersey, before moving to San Diego at age 15. He received a degree in biochemistry from the University of California, San Diego, and went on to found several biotechnology companies before retiring at the age of 48. Patti and Eric married on November 5, 1983. They divorced on March 25, 1994, when Kendra was eight years old. Her grandmother, Gloria Wilkinson, died in December 2004. As a child, Wilkinson wanted to become a marine biologist.

Wilkinson was raised in San Diego's Clairemont neighborhood, and played softball for six years with the Clairemont Bobby Sox. When she left high school, she began working as a glamour model, and also briefly worked as an administrative assistant in a dentist's office.

== Life and career ==
=== 2004–2009: Playboy and The Girls Next Door ===
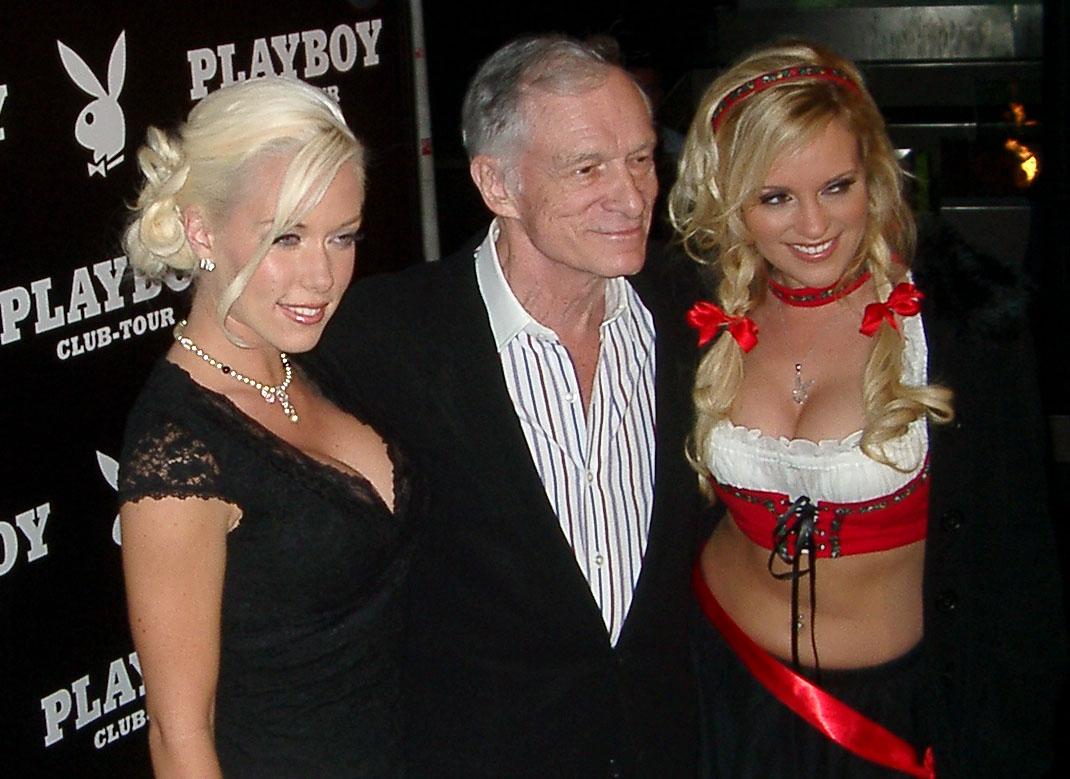
Wilkinson (left) alongside Hugh Hefner and Bridget Marquardt, 2006

Wilkinson met Hugh Hefner at his 78th birthday party in April 2004, where she appeared as one of the "painted girls" (women who are nude except for painted-on accessories). Hefner had seen a photo of her shot by Kim Riley on a fax machine at the Playboy Mansion and wanted to know who she was. Shortly after they met, Hefner asked Wilkinson to be one of his girlfriends, and he moved her into the Playboy Mansion.

She was featured on the E! reality television series The Girls Next Door, which followed the lives of Hefner's then-girlfriends: Wilkinson, Holly Madison, and Bridget Marquardt. She moved out of the Playboy Mansion in 2009 after meeting her future husband, Hank Baskett, and filmed her own spin-off reality show for E! called Kendra. The first season was about her living on her own and planning her wedding.

Wilkinson has made several cameos on different programs such as Las Vegas and Entourage. She also appeared in Akon's music video "Smack That". While on the set of the video, Eminem poured a bottle of water on her head, though the two later reconciled. In 2006, she appeared in the Playboy Special Edition Sexy 100. In 2007, she appeared in Nickelback's music video of "Rockstar" along with Madison and Marquardt. They also had a cameo role in the 2006 film Scary Movie 4. Wilkinson also showed her creative side as a rapper on MTV's Celebrity Rap Superstar which debuted on August 30, 2007. She rapped to Ludacris' "Fantasy", in response to the question asked by the show's host, "Can Kendra move her mouth as fast as she moves her booty?" She went on to take second place, losing to Shar Jackson.

Wilkinson's stated career goal is to become a massage therapist or sports announcer. In December 2005, she became a regular blogger columnist on the website of the Philadelphia Eagles, a team for which her mother had been a professional cheerleader, and for which her husband played professionally.

=== 2009–2011: Kendra, marriage, and motherhood ===
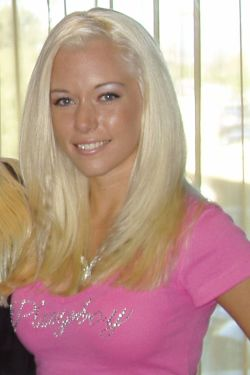
Kendra Wilkinson (2007; age 22).

On August 13, 2008, the Wall Street Journal reported that Wilkinson was Olive Garden's "Biggest Celebrity Fan". Wilkinson has described Olive Garden's cuisine as "my soul food". The newspaper emphasized that her repeated enthusiastic public endorsements of the family restaurant were genuine, personal, and not tied to any payment from Olive Garden. In fact, the company was reported as viewing Wilkinson's endorsements with "mixed feelings", as well as something on which the restaurant was reluctant to comment, since it emphasizes a family-friendly nature.

On September 22, 2008, the International Business Times reported that Wilkinson was engaged to then-Philadelphia Eagles wide receiver Hank Baskett. Wilkinson initially denied this, but she later admitted she was in a relationship with him, on October 7, 2008, in an interview with Chelsea Handler on Chelsea Lately. On November 6, 2008, E! Online announced Wilkinson and Baskett were engaged, after he had proposed the previous Saturday at the Space Needle in Seattle, Washington.

Wilkinson married Baskett on June 27, 2009, at the Playboy Mansion. Although it was initially announced that Hugh Hefner would give the bride away, Kendra's brother Colin walked her down the aisle. Wilkinson's family was in attendance, as well as former Girls Next Door stars Holly Madison and Bridget Marquardt. On the wedding episode of Kendra, she said that she would be taking Baskett's last name. They lived in Calabasas, California. On June 11, 2009, Wilkinson announced her first pregnancy. The baby, a boy, was born in December 2009. Wilkinson's friends hosted a baby shower on September 9, 2009. She told E! News that Hefner would be the child's godfather. but later denied this.

In an interview after the birth of their son, Wilkinson revealed she had suffered post-partum depression: "After giving birth, I never brushed my hair, my teeth, or took a shower. I looked in the mirror one day and was really depressed." She attributed her depression to moving to Indianapolis, where her husband played so soon after the birth, and feeling isolated.

Wilkinson starred in a spinoff of Girls Next Door, titled Kendra, which focused on her life after leaving the Playboy Mansion and getting engaged. The Girls Next Door executive producer Kevin Burns served in the same capacity on the series. Kendra was produced by Prometheus Entertainment, Fox TV Studios, and Alta Loma Entertainment. Kendra premiered on June 7, 2009, and had record breaking numbers for E! with 2.6 million viewers, making it the highest-rated reality debut for the network since 2002's premiere of The Anna Nicole Show. The show's 33rd and final episode, the third-season finale, debuted on January 9, 2011. The show was not renewed for a fourth season.

In 2007, Wilkinson appeared on an episode of WWE Raw with Bridget Marquardt.

On July 6, 2010, Wilkinson published a memoir, Sliding Into Home. Her second book, Being Kendra: Cribs, Cocktails, and Getting My Sexy Back was published on October 20, 2011, by It Books. In the book, she discusses her life after having a child, motherhood and marriage. Wilkinson was a contestant in the twelfth season of Dancing with the Stars, partnered with Louis Van Amstel. She was eliminated in the seventh week on May 3, 2011. Kendra launched her personal website KendraWilkinson.com in November 2011. The digital community offers space for Kendra to answer all her fans questions, and connect with each other while talking about family, friends and laughter.

On March 17, 2010, Wilkinson's E! True Hollywood Story premiered on E!. During the hour-long episode, she discussed her rocky road to stardom. In May 2010, a video recording of Wilkinson having sex with a then-unidentified man surfaced. The recording was acquired by Vivid Entertainment, who planned to distribute the tape as Kendra Exposed. Wilkinson contested the release and threatened to sue should it be released. RadarOnline reported that in 2008, Wilkinson herself set up a company Home Run Productions LLC, through which she made several attempts to sell sex tapes. Sources have reported that Wilkinson was paid $680,000 for the film that was made by her high school boyfriend Justin Frye when she was 18.

=== 2012–2019: Kendra on Top, theatre and divorce ===
After parting ways with E! in 2011, Wilkinson and her family started a new reality show on WE tv, Kendra on Top. It premiered June 5, 2012. The show ended in 2017. The end of the show led to a four-year period where Wilkinson wasn't leading her own show. (Since 2005, Wilkinson starred in The Girls Next Door, Kendra, and Kendra on Top.)

On February 26, 2013, Wilkinson appeared on an episode of Celebrity Wife Swap with Kate Gosselin. On April 20, 2013, she was involved in another automobile accident on a California freeway. Her injuries included having a minor hemorrhagic stroke. On October 31, 2013, Wilkinson announced that she was pregnant with her second child. During her pregnancy, she worked as a celebrity blogger for People magazine. She gave birth to a daughter in May 2014.

In November 2014, Wilkinson was a contestant on the 14th series of the British reality television series I'm a Celebrity...Get Me Out of Here!, finishing in sixth place. On April 28, 2017, Kendra, Baskett and her mother were one of the families featured on the WE reality show Marriage Bootcamp: Family Edition. In 2017, Wilkinson portrayed Robyn in the play, Sex Tips for Straight Women from a Gay Man at Anthony Cools Theatre. The play debuted in May 2017 and got extended from a three-month run to an eight-month run. Las Vegas Review-Journal wrote in a review: "But it’s Kendra you’re likely paying to see. And the more time she gets to spend on stage with Rodriguez, the better she’s going to be."

On April 6, 2018, she filed for divorce from Hank Baskett, seeking restoration of her maiden name in the process.

=== 2020–present: Focus on real estate career ===
In 2020, Wilkinson began taking real estate classes and passed the California real estate exam in June 2020. One month later, she was hired as a real estate agent by The Agency, a luxury real estate company founded by Mauricio Umansky. She has since joined real estate company Douglas Elliman and Carswell & Associates. On November 17, 2021, Discovery+ premiered her new reality series, Kendra Sells Hollywood, which covered her new career as a real estate agent for Carswell & Associates in Los Angeles. It was renewed for a second season on February 3, 2022. The second season premiered on May 26, 2023, on Max. The show was cancelled after two seasons.

In a January 2024 interview with People magazine, Wilkinson revealed she has been struggling with depression, saying: "It’s not easy to look back at my 20s. I’ve had to face my demons. Playboy really messed my whole life up."

== Philanthropy ==
Wilkinson has supported numerous charitable organizations such as Bonnie J. Addario Lung Cancer Foundation and Griffin Gives Foundation. In 2013, Wilkinson and Hank Baskett hosted the fifth annual charity golf tournament for Baskett's father's foundation called the Oasis Children's Advocacy Center, which helps child abuse victims. In September 2016, Wilkinson and her son participated in a charity basketball game, whose proceeds went to Stand Up To Cancer.

In December 2016, she hosted an event for nonprofit organization Payaway the Layaway at Kmart in California. Layaways for 18 families were paid at the event. In November 2017, Wilkinson teamed up with Payaway the Layaway for the second time and paid layaways for families at Kmart on North Las Vegas Boulevard. In total, they paid off nearly $4,000 worth of layaway balances of ten families.

== Filmography ==
Film and television
Year	Title	Role	Notes
2005	Las Vegas	Mystique Waitress	Episode: "The Lie Is Cast"; uncredited
2005	Entourage	Playmate	Episode: "Aquamansion"
2005	Curb Your Enthusiasm	Herself	Episode: "The Smoking Jacket"
2005–09	The Girls Next Door	Herself	82 episodes
2006	Robot Chicken	Herself	Episode: "Drippy Pony"; Voice
2006	Scary Movie 4	Blonde #3	Film
2007	General Hospital	Playboy Bunny	Episode: "Episode #1.11376"
2007	Celebrity Rap Superstar	Herself	Contestant; Runner-up
2008	The House Bunny	Herself	Film
2009	How I Met Your Mother	Herself	Episode: "Benefits"
2009–11	Kendra	Herself	43 episodes; also as executive producer and producer (3 episodes)
2011	Dancing with the Stars	Herself	Contestant; 13 episodes
2012–17	Kendra on Top	Herself	77 episodes; also as co-executive producer (14 episodes)
2013	Scary Movie 5	Christian Grey's Slave	Film; Deleted scene
2013	The Mindy Project	Marie	Episode: "Bro Club for Dudes"
2014	I'm a Celebrity... Get Me Out of Here!	Herself	Contestant; 21 episodes
2015	Sharknado 3: Oh Hell No!	Flo	Television film
2015–16	Worst Cooks in America	Herself	Contestant; 7 episodes
2015–17	Marriage Boot Camp: Reality Stars	Herself	23 episodes
2021–23	Kendra Sells Hollywood	Herself	Main role; 12 episodes
2022	Kicking & Screaming	Kendra	Episode: "Kendra Wilkinson Gives Mamrie & Grace Career Advice"
2023	Brother vs. Brother	Herself	Judge; 2 episodes

Music videos
Year	Title	Artist	Role	Notes
2005	"Beverly Hills"	Weezer	Herself	Uncredited
2006	"Smack That"	Akon feat. Eminem	Herself	Uncredited
2007	"Rockstar"	Nickelback	Herself	

Theatre
Year	Title	Role	Notes
2017	Sex Tips for Straight Women from a Gay Man	Robyn	Anthony Cools Theatre at Paris Las Vegas

== Bibliography ==
- Wilkinson, Kendra (2010). Sliding Into Home. Gallery Books. ISBN 978-1439180921.
- Wilkinson, Kendra (2011). Being Kendra: Cribs, Cocktails, and Getting My Sexy Back. It Books. ISBN 978-0062091185.
