= List of The Girls Next Door episodes =

The Girls Next Door is an American reality television series that originally aired on E!. The series focused on the lives of Hugh Hefner's then-girlfriends who lived with him at the Playboy Mansion. Hefner was often on the show along with various Playmates and other celebrities. It premiered on August 7, 2005, and ended on August 8, 2010, with a total of 91 episodes over the course of 6 seasons. The pilot episode was never aired on television but was later released on the season 1 DVD in 2006.

== Series overview ==
Season	Episodes	Originally released	
Season	Episodes	First released	Last released
Pilot		2006 (on DVD)	
1	15	August 7, 2005	December 4, 2005
2	16	July 30, 2006	November 19, 2006
3	15	March 4, 2007	September 2, 2007
4	12	December 9, 2007	March 2, 2008
5	22	August 18, 2008	March 1, 2009
6	11	October 11, 2009	August 8, 2010

== Episodes ==
=== Pilot ===
The pilot episode, titled "Hef's World", was unaired on television, but was later released on the season 1 DVD in 2006.

Title	Original release date
"Hef's World"	2006 (on DVD)
Guest appearances: Janett Munoz, Molly Walker

=== Season 1 (2005) ===
No. overall	No. in season	Title	Original release date
1	1	"Meet the Girls"	August 7, 2005
Bridget, Holly, and Kendra discuss their lives as Hef's three girlfriends. Together with Hef, they go to the AFI salute to George Lucas. The episode was viewed by 990,000 viewers - an estimated double the amount previously watching the same timeslot. Guest appearances: Mary O'Connor, Hank Fawcett, Val Tasso, Eileen Ruiz
2	2	"New Girls in Town"	August 7, 2005
The girls hang out with two future Playmates, who are staying at the Mansion for test shoots. Everyone heads out for dinner and clubbing. The girls find out that they will be featured in a Playboy pictorial. Guest appearances: Audra Lynn, Sara Jean Underwood, Tiffany Fallon, Raquel Gibson
3	3	"Happy Birthday, Kendra!"	August 14, 2005
Hef and the girls head to the Playboy Jazz Festival. They celebrate Kendra's birthday with family and friends. Guest appearances: Destiny Davis, Don "Magic" Juan, Jonathan Baker, Mary Wilkinson, Brian Olea, Colin Wilkinson, Patty Wilkinson
4	4	"What Happens in Vegas..."	August 15, 2005
The girls head to Las Vegas to celebrate Carmella DeCesare's birthday. Guest appearances: Carmella Decesare, Jeff Garcia, Destiny Davis
5	5	"Fight Night"	August 28, 2005
It's Fight Night at the Mansion while Hef's former girlfriend, Barbi Benton, comes to visit and reminisce about the old days. Guest appearances: Peyton Manning, Keith Hefner, Barbi Benton, Dianne Wiley, Sugar Ray Leonard, Maria Sharapova, Matthew Perry, Anastasia Case, Michael Vartan, Verne Troyer, Ray Anthony, Alfonso Gomez Jr., Garry Shandling, Destiny Davis, Hank Fawcett, Phil Fondacaro, Dr. Diana Wiley
6	6	"Operation Playmate"	September 11, 2005
The girls prepare and send care packages to U.S. troops around the world. Bridget has an emotional visit with her brother. The Mansion hosts a Fourth of July party. Guest appearances: Destiny Davis, Kara Monaco, Audra Lynn, Anastasia Case, Hank Fawcett, Jillian Grace, Pat Lacey, Mary O'Connor, Brian Olea, Bryant, Norma Maister, Joey Sylvester
7	7	"Just Shoot Me"	September 25, 2005
The girls pose for a Playboy pictorial that reflects each girls' individuality. Meanwhile, Bridget is stressed over her final exams. Guest appearances: Anastasia Case, Stephanie Morris
8	8	"A Midsummer Night's Dream"	October 2, 2005
The girls, along with Bridget's sister Anastasia, endure several hair and make up appointments while getting ready for Playboy's Midsummer Night's Dream, the annual hedonistic ritual that has become one of L.A.'s most anticipated summer events. Guest appearances: Anastasia Case, FrazierArts.com Incorporated, Mark Frazier, Susan Frazier, Michael Frazier, Megan Frazier, Jonathan Baker, Jerri Manthey
9	9	"Under the Covers"	October 23, 2005
Holly decides to renovate the guest house. The girls have a Playboy cover photo shoot. Holly hosts and cooks a barbecue. Guest appearance: Anastasia Case, Julie McCullough
10	10	"Ghostbusted"	October 30, 2005
Bridget investigates the Mansion's long-running history of spirits and ghosts and contacts a paranormal investigator. The girls join Hef for a movie in his bedroom.
11	11	"Grape Expectations"	November 6, 2005
The girls head to Bridget's hometown to hang with her family, friends, and have a wine tasting. Guest appearance: Anastasia Case
12	12	"I'll Take Manhattan"	November 13, 2005
The girls and Hef go to New York for a promotional tour and appear on The View. Later on, they hold a dinner honoring Hef. Guest appearances: Rita Cosby, Courtney Culkin, Christie Hefner, Pilar M. Lastra, Monica Leigh, Mary O'Connor, Brian O'Lare, Keith Hefner, Howard Stern, Robin Quivers, Tim Vincent, Barbara Walters
13	13	"My Kind of Town"	November 20, 2005
The girls travel to Hef's hometown and visit his old home, take a tour of the city, and visit the Playboy Headquarters. Guest appearances: Keith Hefner, Monica Leigh
14	14	"Clue-Less"	November 27, 2005
The girls hold a charity tennis tournament where Kendra and Destiny compete against each other and murder mystery party is held for Bridget's birthday.
15	15	"It's Vegas, Baby!"	December 4, 2005
The girls go on a trip to Las Vegas to visit the Palms Casino. Guest appearances: Roberto Cavalli, Carmella Decesare, Jillian Grace, Sara Jean Underwood, Tiffany Fallon

=== Season 2 (2006) ===
Season 2 premiered on July 30, 2006. The first two episodes aired together as a special, on-hour version titled, "Happy Birthday, Hef".

No. overall	No. in season	Title	Original release date
16	1	"Here's Looking at You, Hef!" "Happy Birthday, Hef Part 1"	July 30, 2006
The girls plan a trip to celebrate Hef's birthday. The episode was viewed by 1.6 million viewers - a three-year high for the E! network. Guest appearance: Jonathan Baker
17	2	"80 Is the New 40" "Happy Birthday, Hef Part 2"	July 30, 2006
The girls plan a trip to celebrate Hef's birthday. Guest appearances: Paris Hilton, Donald Trump, Ivanka Trump
18	3	"Career Dazed"	August 6, 2006
Holly and Bridget shoot a Captain Morgan ad, while Kendra appears on the cover of MuscleMag. The Mansion has a screening for Scary Movie 4, in which the girls have a cameo.
19	4	"Mutiny on the Booty"	August 13, 2006
The girls pose for a second Playboy pictorial photo shoot. Hef wants them to pose on the round bed, but the girls convince him to focus on their individual personalities.
20	5	"San Diego or Busts"	August 20, 2006
Kendra brings Hef and the girls to visit her family in San Diego.
21	6	"Heavy Petting"	September 3, 2006
Bridget throws a birthday party for her dog, while the Mansion holds its family-friendly Easter party.
22	7	"Sleepwear Optional"	September 10, 2006
Hef names Kara Monaco as the 2006 Playboy Playmate of the year, and the girls celebrate with a slumber party. Guest appearances: Kara Monaco, Monica Leigh
23	8	"I See London, I See France"	September 17, 2006
The girls and Hef travel to Europe, starting with London and Paris, to celebrate Hef's 80th birthday.
24	9	"When in Rome"	September 24, 2006
Hef and the girls continue the Europe vacation, visiting Cannes, Barcelona, Munich, Rome, Naples, and Venice.
25	10	"Baby Talk"	October 1, 2006
The girls host a baby shower for former Playboy Playmate, Victoria Fuller. Guest appearance: Victoria Fuller, Jonathan Baker
26	11	"The 21 Club"	October 8, 2006
The girls go wild in Las Vegas for Kendra's 21st birthday.
27	12	"Girls Will Be Ghouls"	October 15, 2006
The girls celebrate Bridget's favorite holiday, Halloween.
28	13	"The Age of Aquarium"	October 29, 2006
The girls appear on Loveline. Holly gets new fishes for the aquarium for Hef. A fondue party is held to celebrate Holly and Hef's fifth anniversary.
29	14	"Rabbit Season"	November 5, 2006
An audition for Bunnies at the new Playboy Club in Las Vegas is held at the Mansion with the girls as judges.
30	15	"We Can Work It Out"	November 12, 2006
The girls film an exercise video. Guest appearance: Hector Echavarria
31	16	"Playboys After Dark"	November 19, 2006
Hef and the girls go to Las Vegas for the grand opening of the Playboy Club.

=== Season 3 (2007) ===
No. overall	No. in season	Title	Original release date
32	1	"Snow Place Like Home"	March 4, 2007
The staff create a winter wonderland for the girls and Hef to celebrate Christmas at the Mansion. This episode was viewed by 2.17 million viewers - the second highest for a season premiere in E!'s sixteen-year history. Guest appearance: Jonathan Baker
33	2	"May The Horse Be With You"	March 11, 2007
The girls work on their New Years resolutions after helping with a Star Wars themed float for the Tournament of Roses Parade. The girls and their friends go horseback riding. Guest appearance: Anastasia, Julie McCullough, Sara Jean Underwood, Alison Waite, Janine Habeck
34	3	"Let Them Eat Birthday Cake"	March 18, 2007
The Mansion holds a Marie Antoinette themed birthday party for Holly. Guest appearances: Sara Jean Underwood, Alison Waite, Monica Leigh, Janine Habeck, Tiffany Fallon, Cristal Camden
35	4	"My Bare Lady"	April 1, 2007
Holly works as an apprentice editor to Marilyn Grabowski, Playboy's west coast editor. Guest appearance: Tamara Sky
36	5	"Calendar Girls"	April 8, 2007
The girls plan solo photo shoots for their 2008 calendar.
37	6	"Snowboarded"	April 15, 2007
The girls head to Colorado to snowboard and relax at a resort. Guest appearances: Shaun White, Jonathan Baker
38	7	"Hearts Afire"	April 22, 2007
The girls and Hef celebrate Valentine's Day. The Mansion throws a Mardi Gras party. Guest appearances: Destiny Davis, Brittany Binger
39	8	"P.M.O. Why Not?"	May 6, 2007
The next Playmate of the Year competition gets the girls buzzing. Guest appearances: Sara Jean Underwood, Janine Habeck
40	9	"Family Affairs"	May 13, 2007
Bridget goes to Chicago with her mom, Kendra fixes up her condo with her family, and Holly stays home with Hef. Guest appearances: Patrice Hollis, Courtney Rachel Culkin
41	10	"Hef's Vegas Birthday" "Home, Sweet Suite"	May 20, 2007
The girls and celebrate his birthday with a party in Las Vegas.
42	N–A	"Bedtime Stories: The Best of the Girls Next Door"	May 28, 2007
Hef and the girls reminisce about the past several years and clips of past episodes are shown. Note: This was a special hour-long clip show
43	11	"Training Dazed"	August 12, 2007
Bridget sends her dog to obedience school, while Kendra goes to charm school.
44	12	"Dangerous Curves"	August 19, 2007
Kendra prepares to race in the Toyota Celebrity Grand Prix, Holly rents a Prius, and Bridget gets rims for her car.
45	13	"Surely, You Joust"	August 26, 2007
Hef and the girls visit the Renaissance Fair. Guest appearance: Keith Hefner
46	14	"Guess Who's Coming to Luncheon?"	September 2, 2007
Holly's family tours Playboy Studio West and the Playmate of the Year Luncheon is held at the Mansion. Guest appearances: Sara Jean Underwood, Barbi Benton

=== Season 4 (2007–08) ===
No. overall	No. in season	Title	Original release date
47	1	"Patriot Dames"	December 9, 2007
The Mansion throws a 4th of July party and Bridget's brother, an Army Ranger, visits the Mansion. Guest appearances: Sara Jean Underwood, Mary O'Connor, Victoria Fuller, Jonathan Baker, Anastasia Case, Eddie Sandmeier, Keith Hefner, Cristal Camden
48	2	"Heavy Lifting"	December 16, 2007
Holly redecorates the Mansion's gym, while Kendra's mom gets plastic surgery and recovers at the Mansion. Guest appearance: Patty Wilkinson
49	3	"Half-Baked Alaska"	December 23, 2007
The girls go to Alaska to visit Holly's childhood hometown.
50	4	"Unveilings"	December 30, 2007
Kendra's mom, Patti, makes her first public appearance after her plastic surgery at the Mansion's Midsummer Night's Dream party. Guest appearance: Paris Hilton
51	5	"There's Something About Mary O'Connor"	January 6, 2008
The girls go to the Playboy Golf Scramble and have a girl's day at Hef's secretary's, Mary, house. Guest appearances: Victoria Fuller, Mary O'Connor
52	6	"The Full Monte Carlo"	January 13, 2008
The girls and Hef are invited to attend the International Television Festival in Monte Carlo, Monaco by Prince Albert. Guest appearances: Albert II, Prince of Monaco, Chad Michael Murray
53	7	"Everyday Is Wednesday"	January 20, 2008
Holly gets a new bird for the Mansion's zoo, Kendra consults a pet psychic, and Bridget takes her dog, Wednesday, to get an agent. Guest appearance: Bob Saget, Karen McDougal
54	8	"Go West, Young Girl"	January 27, 2008
Holly's first task as West Coast photo editor of Playboy is to review four candidates who come to the Mansion to be photographed.
55	9	"Jamaican Me Crazy"	February 10, 2008
The girls go to Jamaica for Holly's sister's wedding.
56	10	"Wedding Belles"	February 17, 2008
Holly's sister, Stephanie, gets married.
57	11	"It's My Party and I'll Die if I Want To"	February 18, 2008
Bridget plays a haunted murder mystery game for her birthday party. Guest appearance: Barbi Benton
58	12	"Surf's Up"	March 2, 2008
Bridget and Kendra take surfing lessons from Kelly Slater, while Holly gets a swimming lesson from Amanda Beard. Guest appearance: Amanda Beard, Janine Habeck, Kelly Slater

=== Season 5 (2008–09) ===
No. overall	No. in season	Title	Original release date
59	1	"House Bunnies"	August 18, 2008
The girls play themselves in The House Bunny, a film starring a fictitious Playmate played by Anna Faris.
60	2	"Hot Chocolate"	October 5, 2008
Hef and the girls celebrate his 82nd birthday in Las Vegas. They copy their privates in chocolate and give them to Hef. Pamela Anderson also does a strip tease. Guest appearances: Pamela Anderson, Kayla Collins, George J. Maloof, Jr., Cooper Hefner
61	3	"She Got Game"	October 12, 2008
Holly works on the photo shoot of Kayla. Bridget looks for an outfit to wear for the Super Bowl party. Kendra plays in a celebrity flag football game. Playboy hosts a party for the Super Bowl in Arizona. Guest appearance: Kayla Collins, Brittany Binger
62	4	"Scream Test"	October 19, 2008
Bridget becomes the co-producer of the horror film, The Telling and the Mansion hosts a Halloween party. Guest appearance: Mike Hill
63	5	"Change of Undress"	October 26, 2008
Holly redecorates the Playmate house across the street from the Mansion.
64	6	"Girl Crazy, Part 1"	November 9, 2008
Holly begins the search for the 55th Anniversary Playmate with casting calls at the Mansion and in Chicago. Guest appearance: Cara Zavaleta, Crystal McCahill
65	7	"Girl Crazy, Part 2"	November 16, 2008
Holly's search for the 55th Anniversary Playmate takes her to Dallas and New York. Bridget searches for the perfect hot dog with mustard. Guest appearance: Alyssa Nicole Pallett
66	8	"Kentucky Fried"	November 23, 2008
Hef and the girls attend the Kentucky Derby. Guest appearance: Edward Norton, Bo Derek, Nick Lachey, Beverly Todd, Fred Willard
67	9	"Pleading the 55th, Part 1"	November 30, 2008
The 55th Anniversary Playmate candidates come to the Mansion for test shoots.
68	10	"Pleading the 55th, Part 2"	December 7, 2008
The 55th Anniversary Playmate finalists are photographed for their centerfolds and Hef selects the winner.
69	11	"Catcher in the Raw"	December 14, 2008
Kendra organizes a Playmate softball game. Guest appearances: Kristina and Karissa Shannon
70	12	"Glued to Their Sets"	December 21, 2008
Hef flips through scrapbooks covering his entire life with the girls.
71	13	"Kickin' Aspen"	December 28, 2008
Hef and the girls visit Barbi Benton's Aspen home. Guest appearance: Barbi Benton
72	14	"Happy Birthday, Anastasia"	January 4, 2009
Bridget's sister, Anastasia, celebrates with 21st birthday with the girls. Guest appearance: Anastasia Case
73	15	"Tying the Naughty"	January 18, 2009
Bridget's friend, Stacy Burke, gets married in Las Vegas. Guest appearance: Stacy Burke
74	16	"Fangs for the Mammaries"	January 25, 2009
Bridget works on her horror movie with Holly as a cast member, while Kendra goes car shopping.
75	17	"The Spa Who Loved Me"	February 8, 2009
Hef and the girls invite a fan to the Mansion for her birthday and the girls take their mothers and grandmothers to a spa for Mother's Day.
76	18	"The Big Easy Does It"	February 8, 2009
The girls celebrate Mardi Gras in New Orleans.
77	19	"Scuba, Scuba, Do!"	February 15, 2009
The girls learn to scuba dive. The twins Kristina and Karissa Shannon who were in the running for 55th Anniversary Playmate have moved into the mansion.
78	20	"Third Time's the Charming"	February 15, 2009
The girls pose for a new set of Playboy pictorials.
79	21	"Transitions, Part 1"	March 1, 2009
Bridget leaves the Mansion for a four-month trip to tape her new television series, Bridget's Sexiest Beaches. The Season 5 DVD doesn't include this episode as Hugh Hefner didn't sign off on the release. Notes: One-hour special. Last episode featuring Bridget Ratings (2.535 million viewers
80	22	"Transitions, Part 2"	March 1, 2009
Kendra decides to move out of the Mansion. Notes: One-hour special. Last episode featuring Holly and Kendra The Season 5 DVD doesn't include this episode as Hugh Hefner didn't sign off on the release. Ratings (2.535 million viewers

=== Season 6 (2009–10) ===
No. overall	No. in season	Title	Original release date
81	1	"Meet the New Girls"	October 11, 2009
Crystal, Karissa and Kristina are Hef's new girlfriends. Karissa and Kristina meet Holly in Las Vegas. Note: First episode starring new girls Crystal Harris and Kristina and Karissa Shannon Guest appearance: Holly Madison
82	2	"Look Before You Peep"	October 18, 2009
Hef and the girls are in Las Vegas to watch Holly perform in her Peep Show production. Guest appearance: Holly Madison
83	3	"The Wheel World"	October 25, 2009
The girls ride on a Hollywood tour bus and throw a roller disco party at the Mansion, giving them an opportunity to meet Barbi Benton.
84	4	"The S'more the Merrier"	November 1, 2009
The girls decide to go camping in the backyard of the Mansion with their friends. Ratings: 960,000 viewers
85	5	"Uncover Girl"	November 8, 2009
Crystal becomes a Playmate and the twins rehearse for a Sofia Coppola movie by learning to pole dance.
86	6	"Ciao Time"	November 15, 2009
Hef takes the girls to Italy to attend the Sanremo Music Festival. Guest appearance: Dasha Astafieva Ratings: 919,000 viewers
87	7	"Charity Begins at Holmby"	November 22, 2009
The girls help Bridget with a charity celebrity catwalk, and sell lemonade for the AIDS walk. Guest appearance: Bridget Marquardt
88	8	"Stay Tuned"	November 29, 2009
A film shoot for a video game takes place at the Mansion, and Crystal takes singing lessons. Guest appearance: Smokey Robinson
89	9	"The Showering Inferno"	December 6, 2009
The girls throw a baby shower for Kendra, with the help of Holly and Bridget. Guest appearances: Holly Madison, Bridget Marquardt, and Kendra Wilkinson
90	10	"Deja View"	December 6, 2009
For their one-year anniversary with Hef, the girls make a scrapbook.
91	11	"The Girls Next Door: The Bunny House"	August 8, 2010
A backdoor pilot for a third spin-off focusing on the Playmate House.
