= Kendra (TV series) =

- Genre: Reality
- Starring: Kendra Baskett; Hank Baskett
- Narrated by: Kendra Baskett
- Opening theme: "Go Kendra" by Too Short
- Ending theme: "Go Kendra"
- Country of origin: United States
- Original language: English
- No. of seasons: 4
- No. of episodes: 45 (list of episodes)

Production
- Executive producer: Kevin Burns
- Production location: Los Angeles, California
- Camera setup: Single camera
- Running time: 23 minutes
- Production companies: Prometheus Entertainment; Alta Loma Entertainment; Fox Television Studios

Original release
- Network: E!
- Release: June 7, 2009 – November 20, 2011

Related
- The Girls Next Door; Kendra on Top; Holly's World; The Girls Next Door: The Bunny House

Kendra is an American reality television series that debuted on the E! cable network, on June 7, 2009. The program is the first spin-off of The Girls Next Door, and documents the life of model Kendra Baskett, a former girlfriend of Playboy founder Hugh Hefner, after moving out of the Playboy Mansion, including her engagement and marriage to football player Hank Baskett and her adjustment to being a first-time mother.

On March 21, 2012, Kendra announced that she had parted ways with E!, as the network "went in a different direction". This was following comments made by then-new E! president Bonnie Hammer in July 2011, where she vowed to "get rid of the more Playboy trashy element" from the network while the final season was completing production. This pledge also led to the cancellation of Holly's World.

The series was then followed up with Kendra on Top, which aired on WE tv from 2012–2017.

== Synopsis ==
Kendra follows the antics of The Girls Next Door's Kendra Wilkinson. The blonde bombshell finds herself at a crossroads in her life as she leaves behind the luxuries and amenities of the legendary Playboy Mansion and ventures out to live on her own for the very first time. Newly married to Minnesota Vikings wide receiver Hank Baskett, Kendra struggles to find a balance between being a housewife, her new-found domestic duties and the fun, uninhibited lifestyle she has always lived.

== Development ==
While shooting Season Five of "The Girls Next Door", Kendra confided to Executive Producer Kevin Burns that she would like to move out of the Playboy Mansion and move on with her life. Burns asked her if she was open to the idea of having a show of her own and, with her blessing, took the idea to E! The concept would involve "Kendra ... [moving] out and [living] with two roommates and it would be something like Three's Company with her being a hot, hip-hop version of Suzanne Somers". However once Kendra revealed to Burns in September 2008 that she was in fact in a relationship (and weeks later, engaged), he realized the show he had envisioned wouldn't be viable and, instead, "ended up [with] a romance between [Kendra] and Hank and their engagement".

== Cast ==
- Kendra Baskett (b."Kendra Leigh Wilkinson" June 12, 1985 San Diego, California) She is the former star of The Girls Next Door (along with Holly Madison and Bridget Marquardt) and a former girlfriend of Hugh Hefner. She has moved out of the Playboy Mansion and had rented a house in the valley of Los Angeles, California. In mid-2009 Kendra gave birth to a baby boy named Henry Baskett IV (born December 11, 2009) with husband Hank Baskett while living in Indianapolis, Indiana.
- Hank Baskett (b."Henry "Hank" Baskett III" September 4, 1982 Clovis, New Mexico) He is Wilkinson's new husband. He moved in with Wilkinson on his off season from football, and the two were wed on June 27. The couple decided to move to Philadelphia to raise their baby boy due to Baskett's football commitments; they later moved to Indianapolis, Indiana, and then back to Philadelphia. The two divorced in 2018.
- Hank Baskett IV, aka Baby Hank (b."Henry Baskett IV" December 11, 2009 Indianapolis, Indiana). Little Hank adds excitement and challenges to his parents' lives, from non-stop diaper changes and sleepless nights to first plane trips and separation anxiety.

=== Supporting cast ===
- Brittany Binger – Kendra's friend and also a former Playboy Model.
- Eddie Bochniak – Kendra's assistant.
- Patti Wilkinson – Kendra's mother
- Henry Randall "Hank" Baskett, Jr. – Hank's father
- Judy Baskett – Hank's mother

=== Guest stars ===
- Bridget Marquardt
- Holly Madison
- Hugh Hefner (seasons 1–2, 4)
- Mary O'Connor (seasons 1–2, 4) – Hugh Hefner's personal assistant at the playboy mansion
- Crystal Harris (season 2)
- Stacy Burke (season 1)
- Destiny Davis (season 2)
- Amber Campisi (season 1)
- Tiffany Fallon (season 2)
- Aaron Francisco and his wife – Aaron was Hank's former teammate Indianapolis Colts
- Jon Dorenbos and his wife, Julie (season 4) – Jon was Hank's former teammate Philadelphia Eagles
- Too Short (season 1)

== Episodes ==
| Season | Episodes | Originally released | |
| Season | Episodes | First released | Last released |
|---|---|---|---|
| 1 | 12 | June 7, 2009 | August 9, 2009 |
| 2 | 13 | December 20, 2009 | June 6, 2010 |
| 3 | 10 | November 7, 2010 | January 9, 2011 |
| 4 | 10 | September 25, 2011 | November 20, 2011 |

== Ratings ==
Kendra premiered as the highest-rated series debut on the network since The Anna Nicole Show in 2002. The show out-performed all premiere episodes of The Girls Next Door including last season's debut by 76% in the adult demographic. Its success had a knock on effect, helping to boost the second-season premiere of another show on the E! network, Denise Richards: It's Complicated which attracted a series high of 1.5 million viewers.

The first season averaged 2.6 million viewers and a 1.8 rating among adults 18–49. The final episode of the season, which featured Kendra's wedding, averaged more than 2.1 million total viewers and scored a 1.7 household rating, the highest first-season finale since The Anna Nicole Show in 2002.

The second season premiered to 2.7 million viewers, but this later dropped to 1.7 million by the eighth episode and then continued to drop in subsequent episodes.

The third-season premiere was viewed by 2.27 million viewers which was down from the previous season premiere. By the third episode, ratings were down 41.85% from the premiere and reached a then-season low with only 1.320 million viewers but quickly rebounded the following week giving the highest ratings since the premiere. By the seventh episode, the season reached a new low with 1.243 million viewers. To date the season has averaged 1.720 million viewers.

For the fourth and final season on E!, Kendra was initially moved from her regular 10pm time slot to 11pm where she managed to pull in more than one million viewers per week. But when the show's 10pm lead-in, Dirty Soap failed to deliver an audience, Kendra was moved back to its original time slot where it peaked to a 2.0HH rating following the hugely rated Kim Kardashian wedding special.
