= Mary O'Connor =

Mary O'Connor may refer to:

== Arts and media ==
- Mary O'Connor, a poor servant, subject of the 19th century Irish ballad "The Rose of Tralee"
- Mary O'Connor (died 2013), Hugh Hefner's secretary, frequent guest on The Girls Next Door
- Mary-Anne O'Connor, Australian novelist
  - "There's Something About Mary O'Connor", episode of The Girls Next Door
- Mary Flannery O'Connor (1925–1964), American writer
- Mary H. O'Connor (1872–1959), American screenwriter and film editor
- Mary Murillo (1888–1944), born Mary O'Connor, English-born U.S. actress turned screenwriter

== Politics ==
- Mary O'Connor (Illinois politician) (born 1959), Chicago alderman
- Mary Mitchell O'Connor (born 1959), Irish politician

== Sportswomen ==
- Mary O'Connor (runner) (born 1955), retired long-distance runner from New Zealand
- Mary O'Connor (Irish sportsperson) (born 1977), camogie and Gaelic football player and official
- Mary Anne O'Connor (born 1953), American Olympic basketball player
- Mary I. O'Connor (born c. 1959), U.S. Olympic team rower and orthopedic surgeon

== Other people ==
- Mary Agnes O'Connor (1815–1859), Irish Sisters of Mercy nun and social worker
- Mary O'Connor, a relevant party to the court case Matter of O'Connor, 1988

== Fictional characters ==
- Mary O'Connor, in the 1920 US drama film The Prince of Avenue A, played by Cora Drew
- Mary O'Connor, in the UK soap opera London Bridge, played by Simone Lahbib
- Mary Anastasia O'Connor, the character Maisie Ravier's alter ego in the Maisie series of films

== See also ==
- Mary Connor (disambiguation)
