= List of Kendra episodes =

Episodes of American reality show

The following is an episode list for the E! series, Kendra.

== Series overview ==
Season	Episodes	Originally released	
Season	Episodes	First released	Last released
1	12	June 7, 2009	August 9, 2009
2	13	December 20, 2009	June 6, 2010
3	10	November 7, 2010	January 9, 2011
4	10	September 25, 2011	November 20, 2011

== Episodes ==
=== Season 1 (2009) ===
No. overall	No. in season	Title	Original release date	Prod. code
1	1	"Un-Rappin'"	June 7, 2009	101
Kendra has left the Playboy mansion and is on her own for the first time. She welcomes us to her messy "new life". She throws a housewarming party for her family and friends. Guest stars: Mary O'Connor, Hugh Hefner, Stacy Burke, and Bridget Marquardt
2	2	"The Ex Files"	June 7, 2009	102
Kendra is marrying NFL player Hank Baskett and starts planning for her wedding, and introduces him to her ex, Hugh Hefner, who makes the couple an amazing offer for their wedding. Guest stars: Hugh Hefner and Mary O'Connor
3	3	"Baskett Cases"	June 14, 2009	103
Kendra is hard at work and models for Dave and Busters, a restaurant. Hank and Kendra travel to his hometown to meet his parents. Guest star: Amber Campisi
4	4	"Lust in America"	June 21, 2009	104
After leaving Hank's parents in New Mexico, Kendra and Hank take a road trip back home to Los Angeles. On the way they stop in Roswell to investigate the supernatural stuff. Guest stars: Brittany Binger and Amber Campisi
5	5	"A Star is Shorn"	June 28, 2009	105
Kendra has a lot of clutter to get rid of, so decides to hold a yard sale, with the help of her family and friends. She also has a night out with Hank and rapper Too Short. Guest stars: Amber Campisi, Brittany Binger, Patti Wilkinson, Mary Stotz, Colin Wilkinson, Johnny Makeup, and Too Short
6	6	"No Hanky, No Panky"	July 5, 2009	106
Kendra is back to her wild ways when she parties in Las Vegas after a lingerie shoot. Meanwhile, Hank is at home looking after and cleaning up after the dogs. Guest stars: Johnny Makeup, Destiny Davis, Amber Campisi, and Brittany Binger
7	7	"Bridal Sweets"	July 12, 2009	107
Kendra asks pal Bridget Marquardt to help plan the details for her upcoming wedding to Hank Baskett. Kendra also experiences waxing in a salon environment for the first time. Guest star: Bridget Marquardt
8	8	"Between a Crock and a Hard Place"	July 19, 2009	108
With a little bit of help from a Playboy Mansion Chef, Kendra and Hank throw a dinner party for Hank's football buddies and wives. Guest star: Holly Madison
9	9	"Preggers Can't Be Choosers"	July 26, 2009	109
Kendra's bridal shower does not go as planned when Kendra announces to her mom that she is pregnant, and her mom can no longer condone the wedding.
10	10	"Undress Rehearsal"	August 2, 2009	110
Leading up to Kendra and Hank's Wedding, Kendra attends a sexy bridal shower and celebrates with Hank at the rehearsal dinner.
11	11	"Let Them Eat Wedding Cake"	August 2, 2009	111
The first season concludes with Kendra and Hank wedding at the Playboy mansion.
12	12	"Keepin' it Real"	August 9, 2009	100
Kendra and Hank discuss their future and look forward to being parents. Also: The couple reflect on the show's first season. Guest star: Bridget Marquardt

=== Season 2 (2009–10) ===
No. overall	No. in season	Title	Original release date	Prod. code
13	1	"Here Comes Baby"	December 20, 2009	201-60
Kendra and Hank unexpectedly move to Indianapolis and prepare for the birth of their first-born child. Note: This was a special one-hour episode.
14	2	"Date Night"	March 14, 2010	202
After giving birth to her first child, Hank Baskett IV, Kendra is ready to lose the weight that she gained during her pregnancy. Also, she and Hank go on their first date since the baby's birth.
15	3	"Three Girls and a Baby"	March 21, 2010	203
Kendra's old friends Brittany Binger and Tiffany Fallon come to visit. Kendra reveals her insecurities about her post baby body to Hank.
16	4	"The Big Game"	March 28, 2010	204
Kendra starts working out again to pose for an "after baby" photo shoot for OK! Magazine in Miami. Also in Miami it's Super Bowl XLIV and it's the Colts vs. Saints!
17	5	"With a Little Help From My Friends"	April 11, 2010	205
With the football season over, Holly Madison and Bridget Marquardt pitch in to help Kendra and Hank move back to Los Angeles. Guest star: Bridget Marquardt and Holly Madison
18	6	"Are We There Yet?"	April 18, 2010	206
Hank, Kendra and Little Hank make the cross-country move back to Los Angeles, reminisce about their Indianapolis adventures, and visit with friends along the way. Guest star: Holly Madison (archive footage from The Girls Next Door) and Bridget Marquardt
19	7	"Me Tarzana, You Kendra"	April 25, 2010	207
Now that Kendra and Hank are back in Los Angeles, they meet with an interior decorator, furnish their new house, and even hire a security team.
20	8	"Let Them Eat Cupcakes"	May 2, 2010	210
As Kendra and Hank take Little Hank to the Mansion to meet Hef for the first time, Bridget plans a surprise welcome home party at her house. Guest stars: Bridget Marquardt, Hugh Hefner, and Crystal Harris
21	9	"The Eagle Has Landed"	May 9, 2010	208
Kendra juggles the demands of motherhood with the demands of her new trainer; Hank learns which NFL team he is going to play for in the 2010 season. Guest star: Bridget Marquardt (archive footage from The Girls Next Door)
22	10	"GILF Trip"	May 16, 2010	209
Kendra sets up her mother on a blind date. Guest star: Bridget Marquardt (archive footage from The Girls Next Door)
23	11	"Here's Looking at You, Kendra"	May 23, 2010	211
Kendra struggles with her appearance now that she's a mom, Hank is offered a modeling job.
24	12	"Chips Ahoy"	May 30, 2010	212
Kendra makes a swimsuit appearance in Las Vegas and visits with Holly Madison.
25	13	"True Confessions"	June 6, 2010	213
Kendra works on her tell-all autobiography which Hank believes is too revealing.

=== Season 3 (2010–11) ===
No. overall	No. in season	Title	Original release date	Prod. code	US viewers (millions)
26	1	"Welcome to Philadelphia"	November 7, 2010	301	2.270
Kendra and Hank come back to Philadelphia where Kendra learns that not everyone thinks she is still the sexy playmate from the mansion.
27	2	"Let the Games Begin"	November 14, 2010	302	1.924
As Hank anxiously awaits news of whether he made the Philadelphia Eagles final roster or not, Kendra is determined to make Hank's birthday the best he's ever had.
28	3	"Fashion Weak"	November 21, 2010	303	1.320
Kendra goes to New York Fashion Week, while Hank's parents take care of Baby Hank. Kendra realizes that she and fashion elite don't mix.
29	4	"The Unkindest Cut"	November 28, 2010	304	1.956
Hank and Kendra learn the Eagles have cut him from their roster.
30	5	"Interception"	December 5, 2010	305	1.615
Kendra and Hank's future hangs in the balance when Hank plays his first game for the Minnesota Vikings.
31	6	"Bye-Bye, Bye Week"	December 12, 2010	306	1.714
Kendra and Hank must make a decision that could pull their family apart.
32	7	"Come Out As You Are"	December 19, 2010	307	1.243
Inspired by Kendra and her recent book about her past, Eddie seeks Kendra's advice on opening up to his family about his sexuality.
33	8	"It's All Relative"	December 26, 2010	308	TBA
Kendra finally moves back to LA but struggles with settling into a home without Hank.
34	9	"Out with It"	January 2, 2011	309	TBA
After Kendra gets settled into her new Pasadena house, it's off to San Diego to support Eddie if he decides to come out to his family.
35	10	"Reunion"	January 9, 2011	310	1.803
Kendra and the baby reunite with Hank to celebrate Little Hank's first birthday. Meanwhile, Kendra and Hank deal with all of the rumors and lies about their relationship.

=== Season 4 (2011) ===
No. overall	No. in season	Title	Original release date	Prod. code	US viewers (millions)
36	1	"Here Comes the Neighborhood"	September 25, 2011	401	1.541
Kendra and Hank finally have a home in L.A., but are challenged by the uncertainty of Hank's football career and Kendra's obligations as a sexy celebrity.
37	2	"A Fine Bromance"	October 2, 2011	402	1.305
When Hank whisks Kendra away for a romantic and surprise-filled south-of-the-border trip for their second anniversary, one of the surprises is that pals Jon and Julie Dorenbos tag along. When the trip turns into more of a bromance than romance, Kendra is determined to "bring the sexy back."
38	3	"Victoria's Secrets"	October 9, 2011	403	2.72
While Hank heads to New York in search of professional opportunities beyond the NFL, Kendra helps her friend Victoria find a first date after an unhappy 14-year marriage.
39	4	"Meet Your Match"	October 16, 2011	404	1.497
While Kendra helps Little Hank's nanny prepare for a blind date, Hank seeks out career opportunities in New York.
40	5	"Family Matters"	October 23, 2011	405	1.160
During a personal appearance trip to her hometown of San Diego, Kendra confronts her longstanding issues with her mother, Patti.
41	6	"Fathers and Sons"	October 30, 2011	406	1.182
As Hank anxiously waits to see if he'll be picked up by an NFL team this season, both Kendra and Hank fret about whether or not to have Little Hank's luscious locks clipped. Everyone gets some much-needed perspective on all fronts when Hank Sr. opens up about his recent lung cancer.
42	7	"Lovitz or Leave It"	November 6, 2011	407	1.070
When Kendra discovers Jon Lovitz wants her to audition for a proposed television show, she struggles to prepare with various media trainers. Hank then boosts her confidence with some much-needed -- and very creative -- encouragement and support.
43	8	"Booking It"	November 13, 2011	408	1.308
Kendra's book tour take her through every city she and Hank have lived in since they got married. Along the way, Kendra catches up with old friends and acquaintances, including pal Julie Dorenbos and the shock jock who once accused Kendra of having lost her sexiness - Erich "Mancow" Muller.
44	9	"The Homecoming King"	November 20, 2011	409	1.121
Kendra confronts Hank's past, including his ex-girlfriends, when they attend his high-school reunion.
45	10	"Homeward Bound"	November 20, 2011	410	1.121
Kendra helps Hank deal with his fears of returning home without being part of a football team.
