= Date Night (disambiguation) =

Date Night is a 2010 American comedy film.

Date Night may also refer to:

== Television ==
- Date Night (TV series), a 2018 Australian reality television series

=== Episodes ===
- "Date Night" (According to Jim)
- "Date Night" (At Home with Julia)
- "Date Night" (Back to You)
- "Date Night" (Brothers & Sisters)
- "Date Night" (Entourage)
- "Date Night" (Gigolos)
- "Date Night" (Kendra)
- "Date Night" (Kitchen Boss)
- "Date Night" (Parenthood)
- "Date Night" (Quintuplets)
- "Date Night" (Top Chef: Masters)
- "Date Night" (Woke Up Dead)

== Other media ==
- "Date Night" (The New Avengers), a story arc in the Marvel Comics series The New Avengers
- "Date Night" (Ultimate X-Men), a 2006 story arc in the Marvel Comics series Ultimate X-Men
- Date Night, a 1980s radio program hosted by Susan Block
- "Date Night", a song by Father John Misty from God's Favorite Customer
