= Habeck =

Habeck is a surname. Notable people with the surname include:

- Janine Habeck (born 1983), German model
- Mary R. Habeck (born 1963), American academic
- Michael Habeck (1944–2011), German actor
- Robert Habeck (born 1969), German writer and politician
