= CJ Gibson =

American actress and model

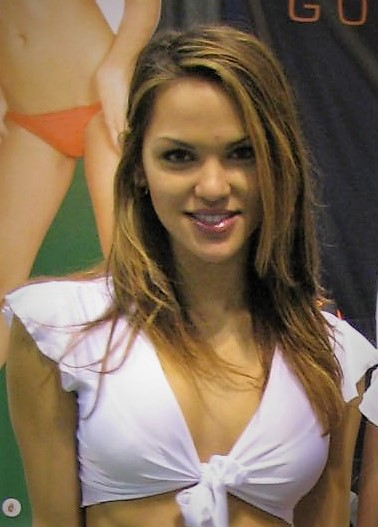
- Gibson at the 2008 PGA Merchandise Show
- Born: November 30, 1983 (age 42); Clearwater, Florida
- Height: 5 ft 7 in (1.70 m)

CJ Gibson (born November 30, 1983, in Clearwater, Florida) is an American model and actress of Filipino and Italian descent. Gibson was the Import Tuner magazine Model Search winner for May, 2007. CJ Gibson is a model for the Falken Drift Team, and can be seen at Formula Drift events.

She has also appeared in several magazines including FHM, American Curves as a cover model, Supreme, MuscleMag International, Muscle & Fitness, Teeze, and in a Bowflex ad.

In 2007, she appeared in a home workout video called ENVY. Her character's name is Eliana, which stands for the "E" in ENVY. She stars alongside Martina Andrews (Natasha), Kara Monaco (Vala), and Brittany Lee (Yvette).

Her younger sister, Raquel Gibson, is also a model and was Playboy magazine's Playmate of the Month for November 2005.
