= Sheryl Gascoigne =

British television personality and author (born 1963)

- Born: Sheryl Failes; 24 September 1963 (age 62)
- Occupation: Television personality
- Spouse(s): Colin Kyle (1986 – ?); Paul Gascoigne (1996–1998)
- Children: 3 (inc. Bianca Gascoigne and Regan Gascoigne)

Sheryl Gascoigne (née Failes; born 24 September 1963) is a British television personality and author. She is the former wife of footballer Paul Gascoigne and the mother of glamour model Bianca Gascoigne. Her television career includes a presenting role on ITV1's Loose Women, and she appeared as a contestant on the tenth series of the UK version of I'm a Celebrity...Get Me Out of Here!

== Life and career ==
Sheryl Gascoigne rose to prominence because of her high-profile relationship, and later marriage, to footballer Paul Gascoigne. Having met in around 1990, they were married in Hatfield, Hertfordshire in July 1996. However, the marriage was a turbulent and ultimately short-lived one, ending in divorce in August 1998. Paul had experienced difficulties with alcoholism and had been abusive towards his wife. In a July 1994 interview with a Sunday newspaper Paul Gascoigne admitted beating Sheryl on a regular basis for two years. The couple later tried to reconcile but without success.

Following her divorce in 1998 Sheryl Gascoigne campaigned for victims of domestic violence, and became a television personality. Among her credits include presenting role on ITV1's Loose Women and appearances in numerous television documentaries. In 2010 she appeared on series ten of I'm a Celebrity Get...Me Out of Here! Having turned down an offer to appear on the programme earlier in the year, she was persuaded to join after one of the other contestants, Gail Porter was forced to drop out, and she was allegedly offered a higher fee to take part. She was the first contestant to be voted off after 13 days.

In 2009 she published a book, Stronger: My Life Surviving Gazza, an autobiographical account of her marriage to Gascoigne in which she made claims about his violent behaviour towards her. She later said she wrote the book in response to accounts her former husband had published about their life together. The News of the World later featured a story under the title "You Lying Bitch!" giving Paul Gascoigne's reaction to the book. Sheryl Gascoigne subsequently sued the newspaper for libel and was awarded an undisclosed amount of compensation in at the High Court in May 2010. In November 2011 she gave evidence to the Leveson Inquiry, established to examine the activities of the media following the News International phone hacking scandal. She told the inquiry she had been portrayed as a gold-digger by the press, but that her former husband's advisers had urged her not to take legal action. She said the media had "constantly" followed her while she was pregnant and that on another occasion she had been forced to crawl around her house on her "hands and knees" to avoid press taking photographs of her through the windows. She said her children also found the media interest difficult.

== Personal life ==
She has two children, including Bianca, from her marriage to Colin Kyle, and a son, Regan, from her marriage to Paul Gascoigne. He adopted Sheryl's two children from her first marriage, and they took his surname. They have claimed that he hit them, which he denies.
