= I'm a Celebrity...Get Me Out of Here! (British TV series) series 10 =

I'm a Celebrity...Get Me Out of Here!
- Series 10
- Presented by: Anthony McPartlin; Declan Donnelly
- No. of days: 21
- No. of castaways: 13
- Winner: Stacey Solomon
- Runner-up: Shaun Ryder
- Companion show: I'm a Celebrity...Get Me Out of Here! NOW!
- No. of episodes: 19

Release
- Original network: ITV
- Original release: 14 November – 4 December 2010

Series chronology
- ← Previous; Series 9 Next → Series 11

I'm a Celebrity...Get Me Out of Here! returned for its tenth series on 14 November 2010. It ran for 3 weeks. Ant & Dec returned as the presenters for the main show, and its spin off show Get Me out of Here... Now returned, with Caroline Flack and Joe Swash as main presenters. On 4 December 2010, singer Stacey Solomon won the show.

Shaun Ryder and Gillian McKeith would return to the series thirteen years later to participate in I'm a Celebrity... South Africa alongside other former contestants to try to become the first I'm a Celebrity legend. They both became the first celebrities to be eliminated.

== Celebrities ==
On 10 November, ITV officially confirmed the 10 celebrities taking part. Dom Joly, Gail Porter and Alison Hammond, initially reported to be joining the show, were not on the list, but Joly and Hammond were later reported to be in Australia on standby for a possible late entry to the show. Playboy model Kayla Collins has been added to the list to complete the lineup.

At the beginning of the series the contestants were divided into separate camps, Camp Bruce (males) and Camp Sheila (females). The contestants entered the jungle either by skydiving into camp or paddling in on canoes. Those facing a watery entrance had to canoe across a lake before crawling through a damp and dark tunnel. The first five-part trial "Terrovision" rewarded the winners with one last night of luxury and punished the losers with a premature entrance into the jungle. The first four tasks earned the winning team one point each, the fifth and final task deciding which group makes their way into the bush.

Gillian McKeith became the second contestant in the history of the show to refuse a task (Kerry Katona was the 1st as she refused her trial in series 3). As the contestant for the task is chosen by a public vote using a premium rate phone number, ITV must refund anyone who asks the cost of their telephone vote.

Dom Joly and Jenny Eclair entered the jungle on 18 November, with more celebrities to enter the show later in the series. Alison Hammond was revealed as the 13th contestant to enter the jungle on Day 6 in I'm a Celeb NOW! she arrived in the jungle in a crate, but the others did not know who was inside.

Celebrity	Known for	Status
Stacey Solomon	The X Factor contestant	Winner on 4 December 2010
Shaun Ryder	Happy Mondays singer	Runner-up on 4 December 2010
Jenny Eclair	Comedian & novelist	Eliminated 10th on 3 December 2010
Dom Joly	Comedian	Eliminated 9th on 2 December 2010
Kayla Collins	Playboy model	Eliminated 8th on 2 December 2010
Aggro Santos	Rapper	Eliminated 7th on 1 December 2010
Linford Christie	Former Olympic sprinter	Eliminated 6th on 30 November 2010
Gillian McKeith	Nutritionist, author & television presenter	Eliminated 5th on 29 November 2010
Britt Ekland	Stage & screen actress	Eliminated 4th on 28 November 2010
Alison Hammond	This Morning presenter & Big Brother 3 housemate	Eliminated 3rd on 27 November 2010
Lembit Öpik	Former Liberal Democrat politician	Eliminated 2nd on 26 November 2010
Sheryl Gascoigne	Author	Eliminated 1st on 25 November 2010
Nigel Havers	Film & television actor	Withdrew on 22 November 2010

== Results and elimination ==
Indicates that the celebrity was immune from the vote
Indicates that the celebrity received the most votes from the public
Indicates that the celebrity received the fewest votes and was immediately eliminated (no bottom two)
Indicates that the celebrity was in the bottom two
Indicates that the celebrity received the second fewest votes and were not named in the bottom two

Daily results per celebrity
Celebrity	Day 12	Day 13	Day 14	Day 15	Day 16	Day 17	Day 18	Day 19		Day 20	Day 21 Final	Trials
Celebrity	Day 12	Day 13	Day 14	Day 15	Day 16	Day 17	Day 18	Round 1	Round 2	Day 20	Day 21 Final	Trials
Stacey	1st 55.94%	1st 53.86%	1st 52.65%	1st 50.59%	1st 55.26%	1st 53.95%	1st 63.0%	1st 66.64%	1st 74.08%	1st 78.67%	Winner; 80.07%	7
Shaun	2nd 26.73%	2nd 19.36%	2nd 19.81%	2nd 21.23%	2nd 15.77%	2nd 19.79%	2nd 16.48%	2nd 18.73%	2nd 15.07%	2nd 16.97%	Runner-up; 19.93%	5
Jenny	Immune	5th 2.73%	8th 2.66%	5th 4.28%	3rd 10.60%	3rd 8.58%	4th 5.93%	3rd 6.44%	3rd 6.29%	3rd 4.36%	Eliminated (Day 20)	5
Dom	3rd 6.98%	3rd 8.16%	3rd 7.78%	4th 5.64%	4th 6.86%	4th 5.77%	5th 5.32%	4th 4.21%	4th 3.92%	Eliminated (Day 19)		4
Kayla	Immune	4th 2.81%	9th 2.59%	3rd 9.92%	5th 3.88%	5th 4.75%	3rd 6.05%	5th 3.99%	Eliminated (Day 19)			3
Aggro	Immune	7th 2.44%	5th 3.01%	8th 1.88%	7th 2.66%	6th 4.08%	6th 3.22%	Eliminated (Day 18)				3
Linford	Immune	10th 1.89%	6th 3.00%	6th 2.89%	6th 2.79%	7th 3.07%	Eliminated (Day 17)					2
Gillian	4th 6.75%	6th 2.67%	4th 3.62%	7th 2.66%	8th 2.18%	Eliminated (Day 16)						7
Britt	Immune	8th 2.27%	7th 2.82%	9th 0.91%	Eliminated (Day 15)							1
Alison	Immune	9th 2.06%	10th 2.05%	Eliminated (Day 14)								2
Lembit	Immune	11th 1.76%	Eliminated (Day 13)									2
Sheryl	5th 3.60%	Eliminated (Day 12)										2
Nigel	Withdrew (Day 9)											1
Notes	1	None	2	None							3	
Bottom two (named in)	Dom, Sheryl	Lembit, Linford	Alison, Kayla	Britt, Gillian	Aggro, Gillian	Aggro, Linford	Aggro, Dom	None	Dom, Jenny	None		
Eliminated	Sheryl; 3.60% to save	Lembit; 1.76% to save	Alison; 2.05% to save	Britt; 0.91% to save	Gillian; 2.18% to save	Linford; 3.07% to save	Aggro; 3.22% to save	Kayla; 3.99% to save	Dom; 3.92% to save	Jenny; 4.36% to save	Shaun; 19.93% to win	
Eliminated	Sheryl; 3.60% to save	Lembit; 1.76% to save	Alison; 2.05% to save	Britt; 0.91% to save	Gillian; 2.18% to save	Linford; 3.07% to save	Aggro; 3.22% to save	Kayla; 3.99% to save	Dom; 3.92% to save	Jenny; 4.36% to save	Stacey; 80.07% to win	

=== Notes ===
^1 In order to win immunity from the first public vote all the celebrities took part in a task called "Kangaroo Court". The two losers from each round would then go to Jungle Jail (located in camp), in the end the celebrities left in jail at the end of the task would face the first public vote.
^2 Alison and Kayla were made to do a trial to decide who was eliminated. However, the trial came to a draw and both refused to take part in the final section. To break the tie, the elimination was decided based on the votes, which meant that Alison was eliminated.
^3 The public were voting for who they wanted to win rather than to save.

== The Camps ==
For the first three days of the show, the group of celebrities were split between two camps: "Camp Bruce" (the boys), and "Camp Sheila" (the girls). The celebrities in each group were:

- Camp Bruce: Aggro, Lembit, Linford, Nigel, Shaun
- Camp Sheila: Britt, Gillian, Kayla, Sheryl, Stacey

Both camps were supposed to be as good as each other, although there were some differences between the camps. Camp Sheila contained a pink and white recliner, a picture of a shirtless man holding a baby and the beds were pink. Camp Bruce contained a black leather recliner, a picture of a woman scratching her bottom in tennis clothes and the beds were blue, Camp Bruce also was slightly bigger.

On 18 November 2010, the two camps merged. The celebrities in the Camp Sheila moved into the Camp Bruce, as it was bigger.

== Bushtucker trials ==
The contestants take part in daily trials to earn food

The public voted for who they wanted to face the trial
The contestants decided who did which trial
The trial was compulsory and neither the public nor celebrities decided who took part

Trial number	Air Date	Name of trial		Celebrity participation	Public vote %	Winner/Number of Stars	Notes
1	14 November	Terrorvision	Hell Holes Kitchen	Kayla; Lembit	—N/a	Lembit	1
1	14 November	Terrorvision	Not The Ten O'Clock News	Gillian; Shaun	—N/a	Shaun	1
1	14 November	Terrorvision	The Bug Factor	Nigel; Sheryl	—N/a	Sheryl	1
1	14 November	Terrorvision	Who Wants To Eat A Willy On Air?	Aggro; Stacey	—N/a	Stacey	1
1	14 November	Terrorvision	Disastermind	Britt; Linford	—N/a	Britt	1
2	15 November	Crate Escape		Gillian; Lembit	63.07% 3.79%	Lembit	None
3	16 November	School Dinners		Gillian; Shaun	63.06% 3.72%	1/5 stars 5/5 stars	None
4	17 November	The Australian Job		Stacey	39.09%	4/10 stars	2
5	18 November	The Shack		Dom; Jenny	—N/a	12/12 stars	None
6	19 November	Aquatic Strife!		Gillian	63.97%	4/12 stars	None
7	20 November	Calamity Cave		Gillian	62.00%	5/13 stars	3,4
7	20 November	Calamity Cave		Sheryl	—N/a	5/13 stars	3,4
8	21 November	Dreaded Digger		Gillian	56.71%	0/13 stars	5
9 (Live)	21 November	Unfairground		Linford	12.17%	12/13 stars	6
10	23 November	Fisherman's Fiend		Dom; Gillian	6.50% 53.70%	6/6 stars 5/6 stars	None
11	25 November	Super Scario		Stacey; Aggro	16.26% 18.05%	12/12 stars	7
12	26 November	Starbugs		Alison; Jenny	—N/a	8/11 stars	8
13	27 November	Creepy Crawley		Aggro	—N/a	3/10 stars	None
14	28 November	The Dentalist		Alison; Kayla	2.05% 2.59%	Kayla	9
15	29 November	Dreaded Digger		Jenny	—N/a	7/8 stars	10
16	30 November	Savage Garden Centre		Dom	—N/a	3/7 stars	None
17	1 December	Stars in Their Pies		Stacey	—N/a	3/6 stars	None
18	2 December	Celebrity Cyclone		Dom; Jenny; Kayla; Shaun; Stacey	—N/a	5/5 stars	None
19	3 December	Rank Banquet		Jenny; Shaun; Stacey	—N/a	2/3 stars 3/3 stars	11
20 (Live)	4 December	Bush Spa		Shaun; Stacey	—N/a	3/3 stars	12,13,14

=== Notes ===
^1 The celebrities were split up into two camps (Camp Bruce for Boys and Camp Sheila for Girls), the winners (the Girls) spent their first night of the show in luxury and the losers (the Boys) spent their first night of the show in a makeshift camp.
^2 Britt, Gillian and Nigel were excluded from this trial on medical grounds.
^3 Alison was excluded because she was new to the camp.
^4 Gillian was allowed to bring someone to help her in this trial; she chose Sheryl.
^5 Gillian was the second celebrity ever to not attempt a Bushtucker Trial, after Kerry Katona in Series 3
^6 Gillian was originally selected to do the trial, but she allegedly fainted and was unable to start it. She received 56.15% of the vote to do the trial.
^7 Britt, Gillian and Alison were excluded from this trial on medical grounds.
^8 Britt was excluded from this trial on medical grounds.
^9 This trial decided who would leave camp and not how camp would be fed. When the trial ended in a draw with both refusing to face the tie-breaker, the public vote was used to decide.
^10 This trial previously was meant to be done by Gillian on Day 8, although she refused to take part.
^11 For the first time ever all celebrities took part in the trial to earn their final meal as a three.
^12 The final trial was the same trial that Dean Gaffney took part in on Series 6.
^13 The two remaining celebrities were allowed to choose any meal they wanted from anywhere, although it came with a price, the price was that they would have to take part in the final live trial.
^14 If Shaun refused to take part in any part of the trial Lembit would be punished and if Stacey refused to take part in any part of the trial Dom would be punished, although Shaun and Stacey did not refuse any part of the trial meaning Dom and Lembit were not punished.

== Star count ==
Celebrity	Number of Stars Earned	Percentage
Aggro Santos	15/22 stars	68%
Alison Hammond	8/11 stars	73%
Britt Ekland	—N/a	—N/a
Dom Joly	26/30 stars	87%
Gillian McKeith	15/36 stars	42%
Jenny Eclair	34/39 stars	87%
Kayla Collins	5/5 stars	100%
Lembit Öpik	—N/a	—N/a
Linford Christie	12/13 stars	92%
Nigel Havers	—N/a	—N/a
Shaun Ryder	16/16 stars	100%
Sheryl Gascoigne	5/13 stars	38%
Stacey Solomon	30/39 stars	77%

== Ratings ==
Official ratings are taken from the Broadcasters' Audience Research Board.

Episode	Date	Official ITV rating (millions)	ITV weekly rank	Official ITV HD rating (millions)	Total ITV viewers (millions)	Share
1	14 November	11.17	5	0.99	12.16	38.0%
2	15 November	9.53	7	0.65	10.18	35.7%
3	16 November	9.01	10	0.74	9.75	34.1%
4	18 November	9.17	8	0.60	9.77	34.4%
5	19 November	6.68	18	—N/a	6.68	21.8%
6	20 November	9.15	9	0.70	9.85	38.5%
7	21 November	10.73	3	0.75	11.48	38.7%
8	22 November	9.76	7	0.71	10.47	36.4%
9	23 November	9.57	8	0.67	10.24	35.5%
10	25 November	8.75	14	0.64	9.39	
11	26 November	9.28	12	0.65	9.93	
12	27 November	9.86	6	0.85	10.71	40.1%
13	28 November	10.51	3	0.85	11.36	38.6%
14	29 November	9.89	10	0.69	10.58	
15	30 November	8.89	13	0.62	9.51	
16	1 December	9.16	12	0.57	9.73	
17	2 December	10.12	7	0.72	10.84	
18	3 December	9.99	9	0.72	10.71	
19	4 December	12.37	3	1.11	13.48	46.5%
Series average	2010	9.66	—N/a	0.74	10.36	
Coming Out	6 December	7.84	15	0.51	8.35	
