= Mary Connor =

Mary Connor or Mary Conner may refer to:

- Mary Conner, a character in Roseanne
- Mary Connor, a referee in the Jack McGrath Cup Camogie Finals
- Mary Connor, a character in the 1931 British thriller film 77 Park Lane

== See also ==
- Mary O'Connor (disambiguation)
