= List of Playboy Playmates of 2006 =

The following is a list of Playboy Playmates of 2006. Playboy magazine names its Playmate of the Month each month throughout the year.

== January ==
Athena Lundberg

Personal details
- Born: April 12, 1986 (age 39); Mountain View, California, U.S.
- Height: 5 ft 6 in (168 cm)

Athena Lundberg (born April 12, 1986) is an American model. She was born in Mountain View, California. She is Playboy magazine's Playmate of the Month for January 2006. Her centerfold was photographed by Stephen Wayda. She had appeared in Playboy TV's Sexy Girls Next Door contest as Athena Dawnelle, winning the opportunity to become a Playmate.

== February ==
Cassandra Lynn
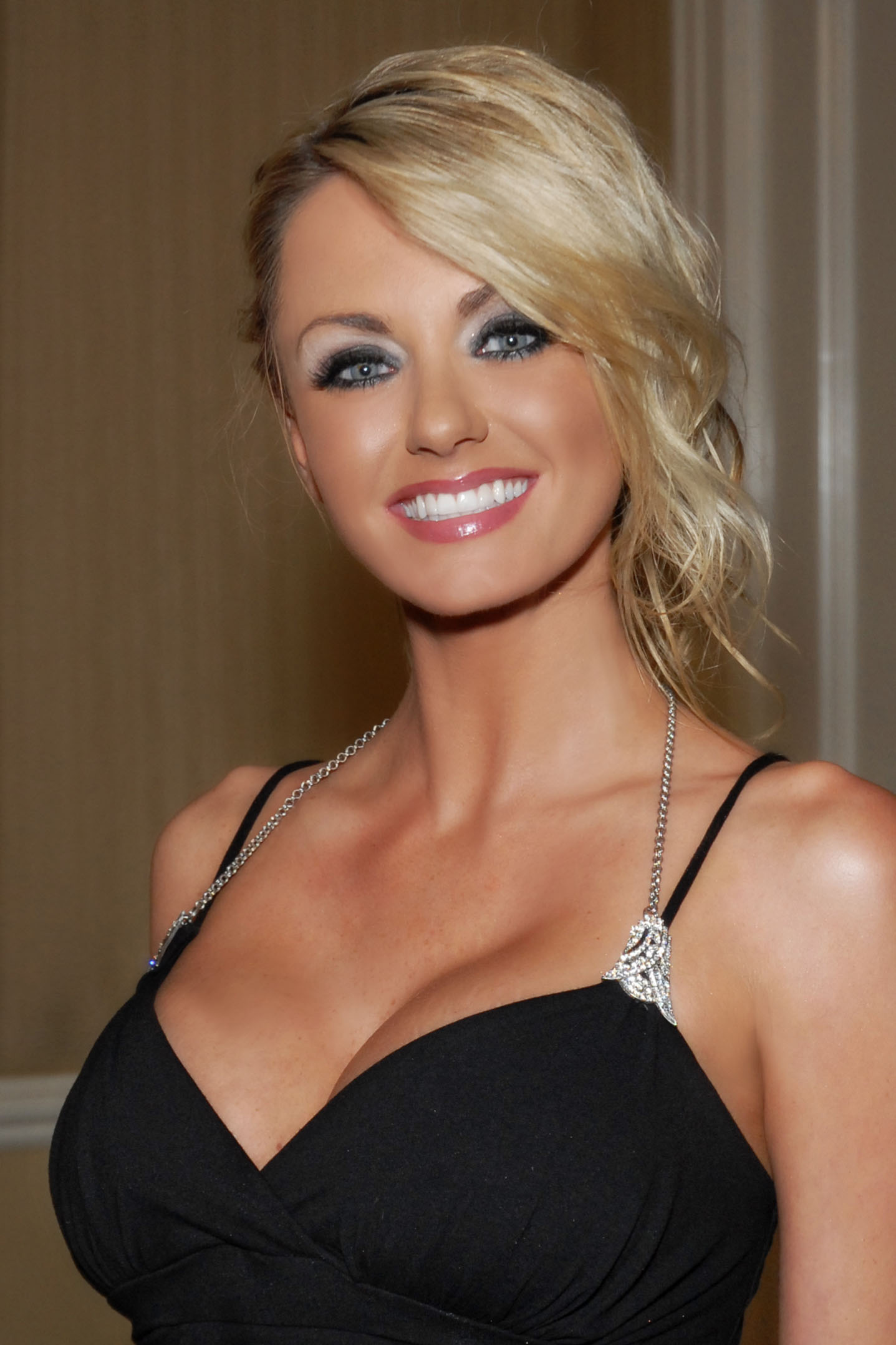
- Hensley in 2008

Personal details
- Born: Cassandra Lynn Jensen; August 15, 1979; Price, Utah, U.S.
- Died: January 15, 2014 (aged 34); Los Angeles, California, U.S.
- Height: 5 ft 5 in (165 cm)

Cassandra Lynn Hensley (née Jensen, previously D'Elia, August 15, 1979 – January 15, 2014) was an American model and is Playboy's Playmate of the Month for February 2006. At age eighteen, Hensley moved to Newport Beach, California to study to become an aesthetician. She also opened a tanning salon and did some modeling. After placing in the Top 20 in a Hawaiian Tropic pageant, she submitted photos to Playboy. It was not until the second time she submitted photos that she received a callback and became a Playmate. She made an appearance on the television series Bikini Destinations in 2008.

Hensley was born in Price, Utah. She was found dead of an apparent overdose, in the bathtub at a friend's home in Los Angeles, on January 15, 2014.

== March ==
Monica Leigh

Personal details
- Born: December 19, 1981 (age 43); Long Island, New York, U.S.
- Height: 5 ft 6 in (168 cm) 114 lb (52 kg; 8.1 st)

Monica Leigh (born December 19, 1981) is an American Playboy model. She began as Playboy's Cyber Girl of the Week for August 29, 2005, then Cyber Girl of the Month for December 2005. She became a Playmate of the Month in March 2006 and was announced as the 2006 Cyber Girl of the Year later that month.

== April ==
Holley Ann Dorrough
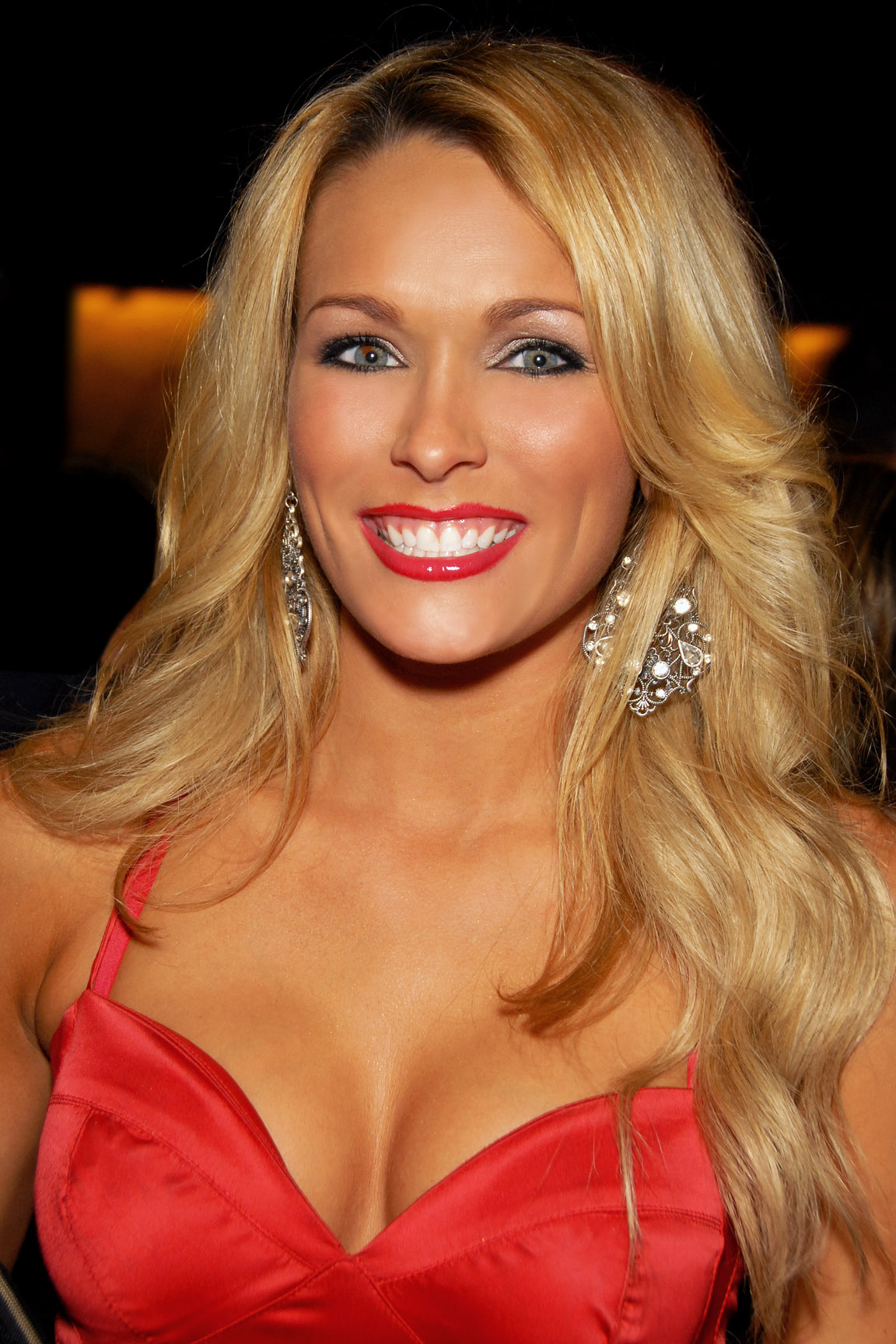
- Dorrough in 2010

Personal details
- Born: August 12, 1986 (age 39); Gadsden, Alabama, U.S.
- Height: 5 ft 8 in (173 cm)

Holley Ann Dorrough (born August 12, 1986) is an American model. She is the Playboy Playmate of the Month for April 2006.

== May ==
Alison Waite
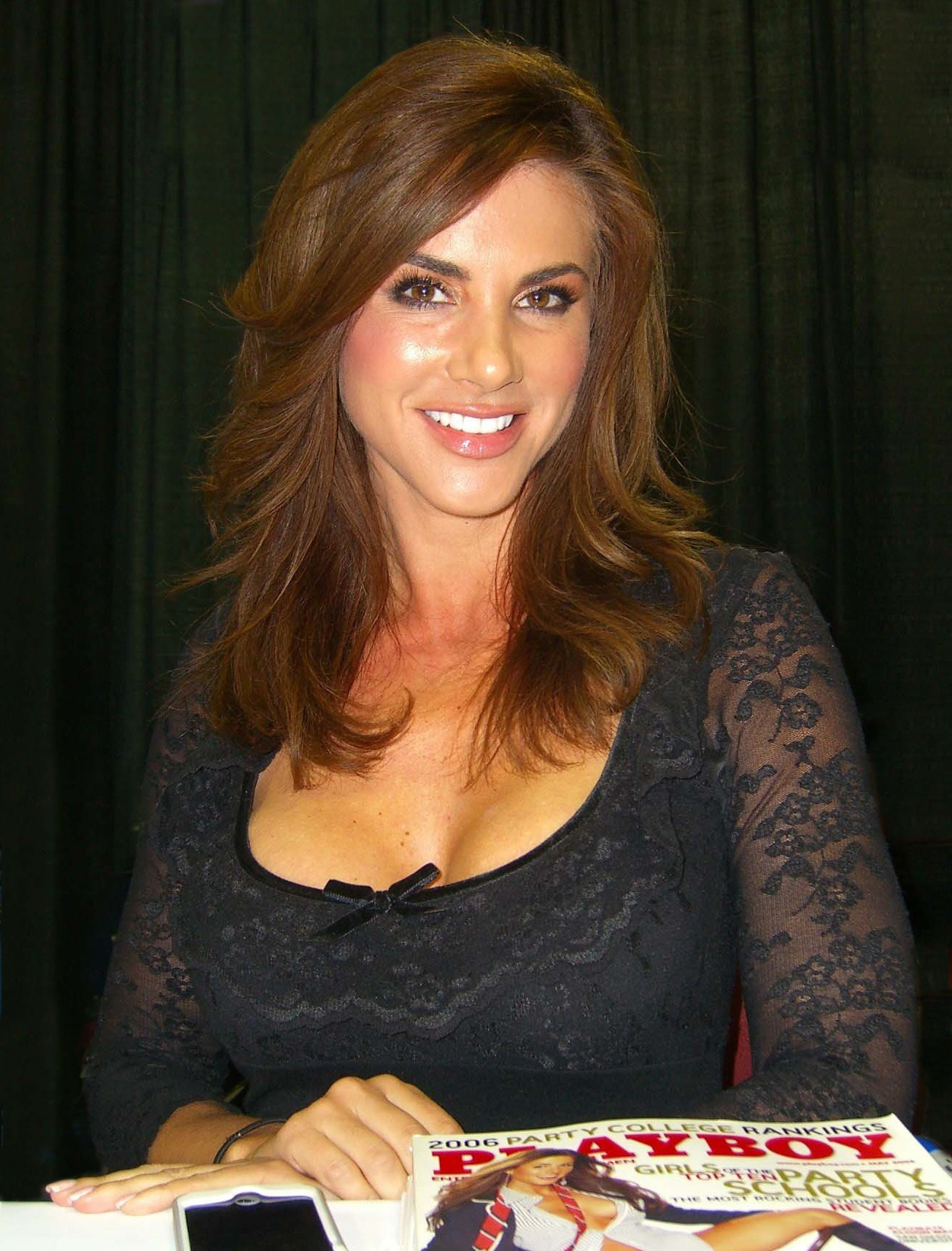
- Waite at the 2011 New York Comic Con

Personal details
- Born: November 10, 1981 (age 43); Los Altos, California, U.S.
- Height: 5 ft 6 in (168 cm)

Alison Waite (born November 10, 1981; Los Altos, California) is an American model. Waite appeared on the cover of the May 2006 issue of Playboy. She is the Playmate of the Month in the same issue. Waite was one of the four finalists for 2007 Playmate of the Year.

In 2014 PepsiCo hired Waite to be an on-camera correspondent for its Super Bowl festivities in Bryant Park in Manhattan, where Waite interviewed subjects including Top Chef Masters alumnus David Burke and New Orleans Saints quarterback Drew Brees.

== June ==
Stephanie Larimore
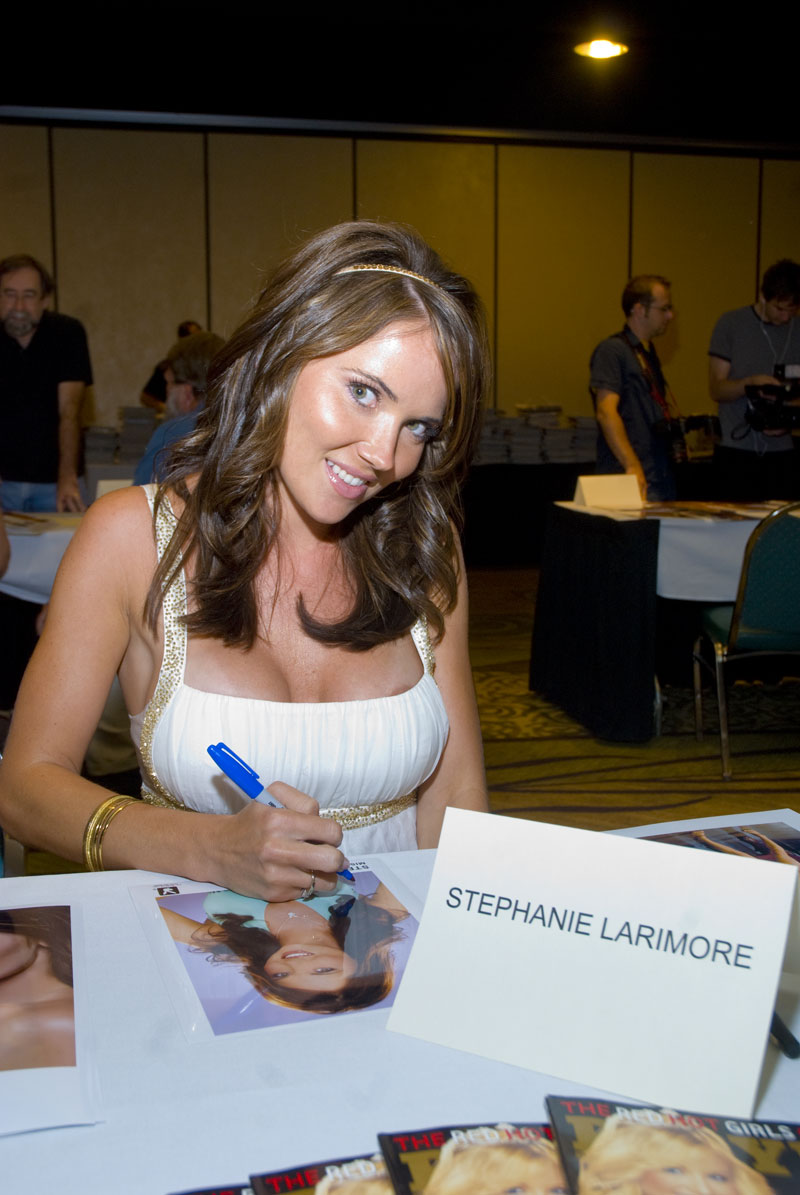

Personal details
- Born: April 21, 1981 (age 44); Fort Wayne, Indiana, U.S.
- Height: 5 ft 4 in (163 cm)

Stephanie Eve Larimore (born April 21, 1981) is an American model. She is Playboy magazine's Playmate of the Month for June 2006. Seven years later, Larimore appeared in the third episode of the ninth season of The Bachelorette where she is romantically linking with her boyfriend Brian Jarosinski, who was disqualified from the show after her appearance.

== July ==
Sara Jean Underwood
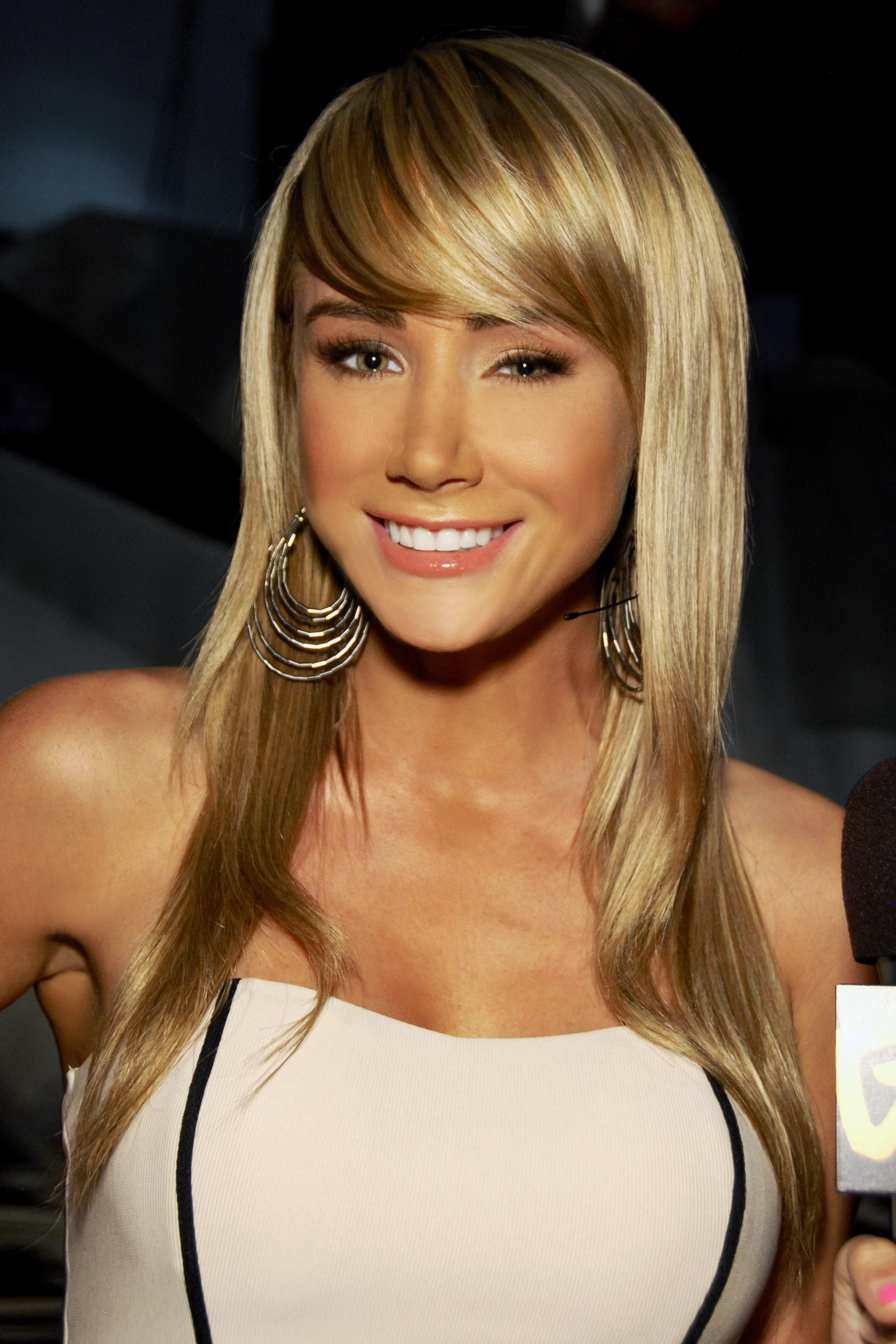
- Underwood in 2011

Playboy Playmate of the Year
- 2007
- Preceded by: Kara Monaco
- Succeeded by: Jayde Nicole

Personal details
- Born: March 26, 1984 (age 41); Portland, Oregon, U.S.
- Height: 5 ft 3 in (160 cm)

Sara Jean Underwood (born March 26, 1984) is an American model and actress who is the Playmate of the Month for the July 2006 issue of Playboy magazine and later became Playmate of the Year in 2007. Sara Underwood first appeared in Playboy as the October 2005 cover model, and in the accompanying The Girls of the Pac-10 pictorial.

== August ==
Nicole Voss
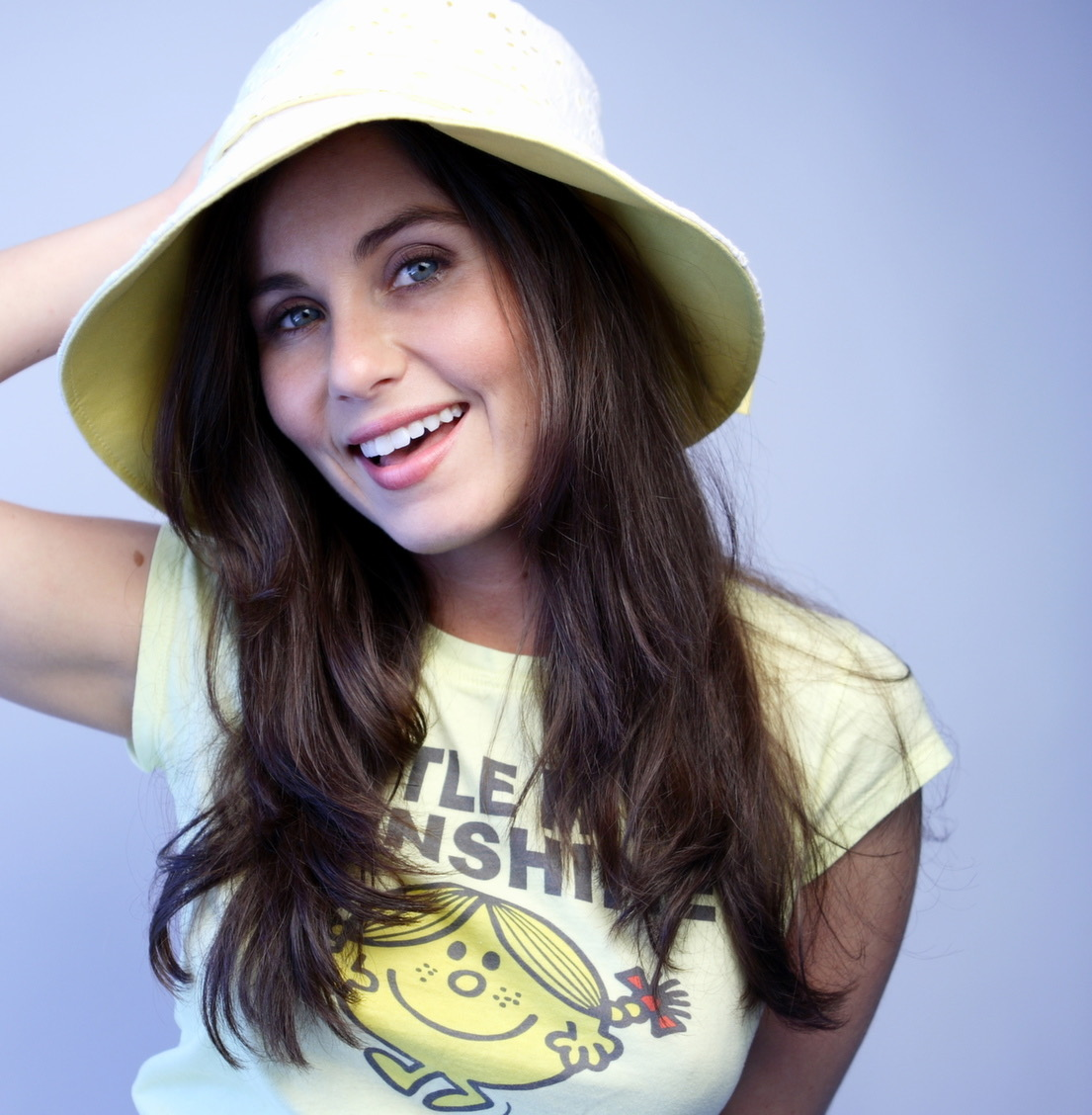
- Voss in 2008

Personal details
- Born: 19 September 1982 (age 42); Ocala, Florida, U.S.
- Height: 5 ft 5 in (165 cm)

Nicole Voss (born September 19, 1982) is an American model from the state of Florida. She is the Playmate of the Month for the August 2006 issue of Playboy. She was chosen to become a Playmate after snapping selfies at home and mailing them to Playboy Studios with a request to pose for the magazine.

== September ==
Janine Habeck

Personal details
- Born: 3 June 1983 (age 42); Berlin, Germany
- Height: 5 ft 6 in (168 cm)

Janine Carmen Habeck (born 3 June 1983; Berlin, Germany) is a German model. Her father is German and her mother is Italian. Habeck was the Playmate of the Month (PMOM) for February 2004 and Playmate of the Year in 2005 (2004 by German Playboy notation) for the German edition of Playboy. She later became the September 2006 PMOM for the United States edition of the magazine.

== October ==
Jordan Monroe

Personal details
- Born: April 14, 1986 (age 39); Denison, Iowa, U.S.
- Height: 5 ft 9 in (175 cm)

Jordan Monroe (born April 14, 1986) is an American glamour model. According to her Playboy pictorial, she is part Polish. She is the Playmate of the Month for October 2006. Monroe is said to be the first Playmate born in Iowa.

== November ==
Sarah Elizabeth

Personal details
- Born: August 9, 1983 (age 42); Glendale, Arizona, U.S.
- Height: 5 ft 5 in (165 cm)

Sarah Elizabeth (born August 9, 1983; Glendale, Arizona) is an American model. She was Playboy's Cyber Girl of the Week in the 4th week of December 2005, and Cyber Girl of the Month in April 2006. She is the Playmate of the Month for the November 2006 issue of Playboy. Her pictorial was photographed by Stephen Wayda.

== December ==
Kia Drayton

Personal details
- Born: April 11, 1983 (age 42); Goldsboro, North Carolina, U.S.
- Height: 5 ft 9 in (175 cm)

Kia Drayton (born April 11, 1983) is an American model who is Playboy magazine's Playmate of the Month for December 2006. She also was the 2004 Hooters Restaurant Swimsuit Calendar centerfold.

== See also ==
- List of people in Playboy 2000–2009

Athena Lundberg	Cassandra Lynn	Monica Leigh	Holley Ann Dorrough	Alison Waite	Stephanie Larimore
Sara Jean Underwood	Nicole Voss	Janine Habeck	Jordan Monroe	Sarah Elizabeth	Kia Drayton
