= Matter of O'Connor, 1988 =

Court case in the New York Court of Appeals

Matter of O'Connor, 1988 was a court case brought before the New York Court of Appeals.

== Mary O'Connor ==
Mary O'Connor was a 77-year-old woman who had experienced strokes in 1985, and was admitted to Westchester County Medical Center. She suffered from the loss of her gag reflex, which made it impossible for her to swallow food. Because O'Connor was unresponsive, physicians and her daughters took control of her care.

According to her daughters, although she was unable to feed herself, she did not want to be kept alive through artificial means.

Her physicians noted that treatment was necessary to preserve her life. They asked the ethics committee for a recommendation, as they felt that it was unethical to deny her the necessary life-preserving treatment.

== Court case ==
The daughters, (both nurses) argued successfully in two lower courts, that their mother did not wish to kept alive by such artificial means. An appeal reversed the two lower-court decisions which had been found in favor of the daughters.

The case was then referred to the New York Court of Appeals. The judge was Chief Judge Sol Wachtler, and a four judge majority ruled.

The Court noted that O'Connor was conscious and able to answer questions. The Court's decision was that O'Connor had not stated clearly that she "had made a firm and settled commitment, while competent, to decline this type of medical assistance".

The court used the ruling of an older case, In re Storar to "deny her the refusal" of receiving this care.
