= Cristal Camden =

American model

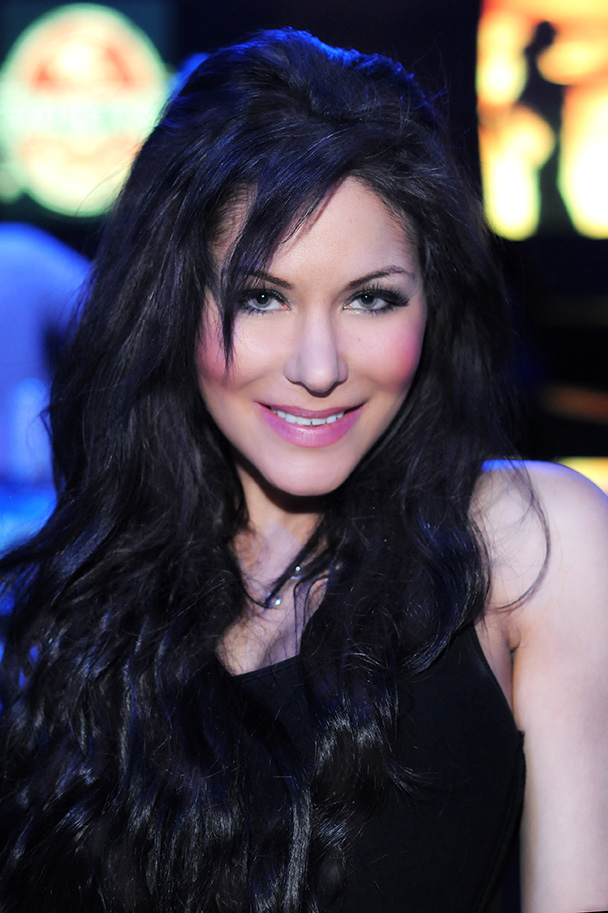
- Cristal Camden, Hollywood, California on May 4, 2014

Cristal Camden (born Cristal Cichowski on September 7, 1981) is a model who dated Playboy founder Hugh Hefner in 2003. She has appeared on the television show The Girls Next Door. Camden was the Playboy Cyber Girl of the Week for May 7, 2007. She sometimes is credited as Crystal Camden. She was born in San Jose, California. In 2022, she disclosed her experiences with bulimia nervosa.
