= Janine Habeck =

German model (born 1983)

Playboy centerfold appearance
- September 2006
- Preceded by: Nicole Voss
- Succeeded by: Jordan Monroe

Personal details
- Born: 3 June 1983 (age 42) West Berlin, Germany
- Height: 1.68 m (5 ft 6 in)

Janine Carmen Habeck (born 3 June 1983) is a German model. She was born in West Berlin. Her father is German and her mother is Italian.

Habeck was the Playmate of the Month (PMOM) for February 2004 and Playmate of the Year in 2005 (2004 by German Playboy notation) for the German edition of Playboy. She was later the September PMOM in 2006 for the United States edition of the magazine.

In November 2005, Habeck was awarded the title Miss Centerfold by readers of the German edition of Playboy, celebrating the 400th issue of the magazine.

Habeck's ten-kilogram weight gain and subsequent efforts to regain her figure were featured on the German tabloid show taff in 2007.

Athena Lundberg	Cassandra Lynn	Monica Leigh	Holley Ann Dorrough	Alison Waite	Stephanie Larimore
Sara Jean Underwood	Nicole Voss	Janine Habeck	Jordan Monroe	Sarah Elizabeth	Kia Drayton
