= List of Playboy Playmates of 2008 =

The following is a list of Playboy Playmates of 2008. Playboy magazine names their Playmate of the Month each month throughout the year.

== January ==
Sandra Nilsson
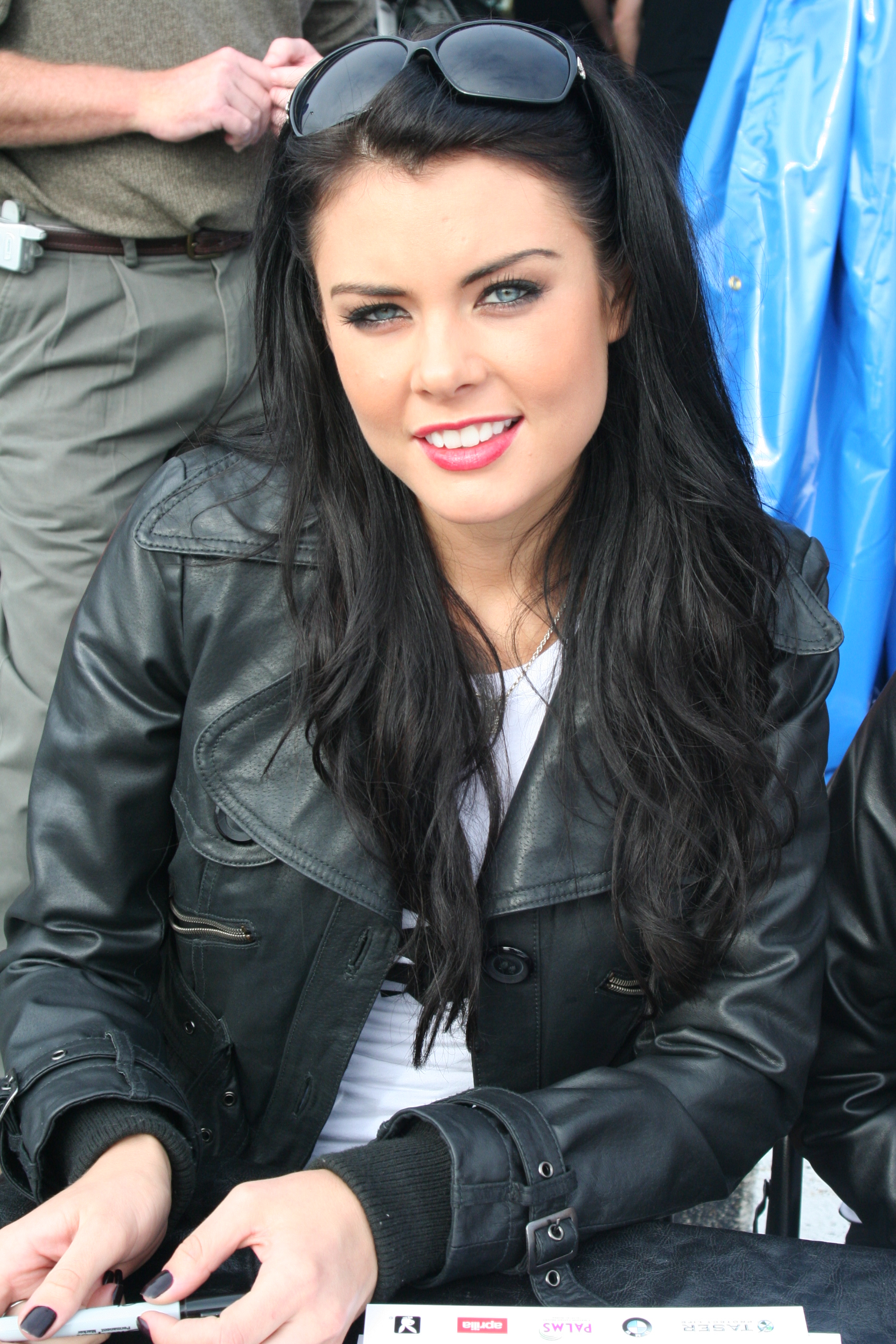
- Nilsson in 2008

Personal details
- Born: 17 February 1986 (age 40) Ystad, Sweden
- Height: 5 ft 9 in (1.75 m)

Sandra Nilsson (born 17 February 1986 in Ystad, Sweden) is a Swedish model who is the Playboy Playmate of the Month for January 2008.

== February ==
Michelle McLaughlin
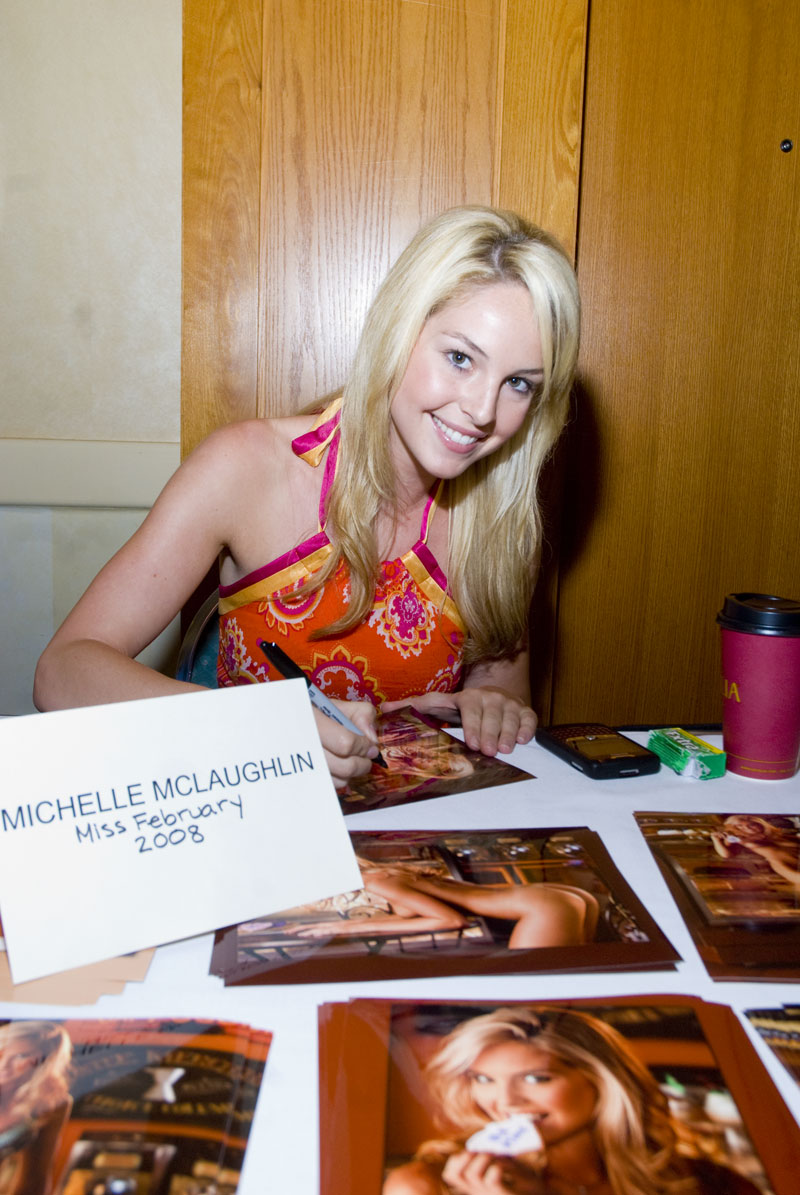

Personal details
- Born: June 19, 1986 (age 39) Redwood City, California, U.S.
- Height: 5 ft 7 in (1.70 m) 115 lb (52 kg; 8.2 st)

Michelle McLaughlin (born June 19, 1986) is Playboy's Playmate of the Month for February 2008. She was married to sports reporter and former baseball player (2010–2013) F. P. Santangelo.

== March ==
Ida Ljungqvist
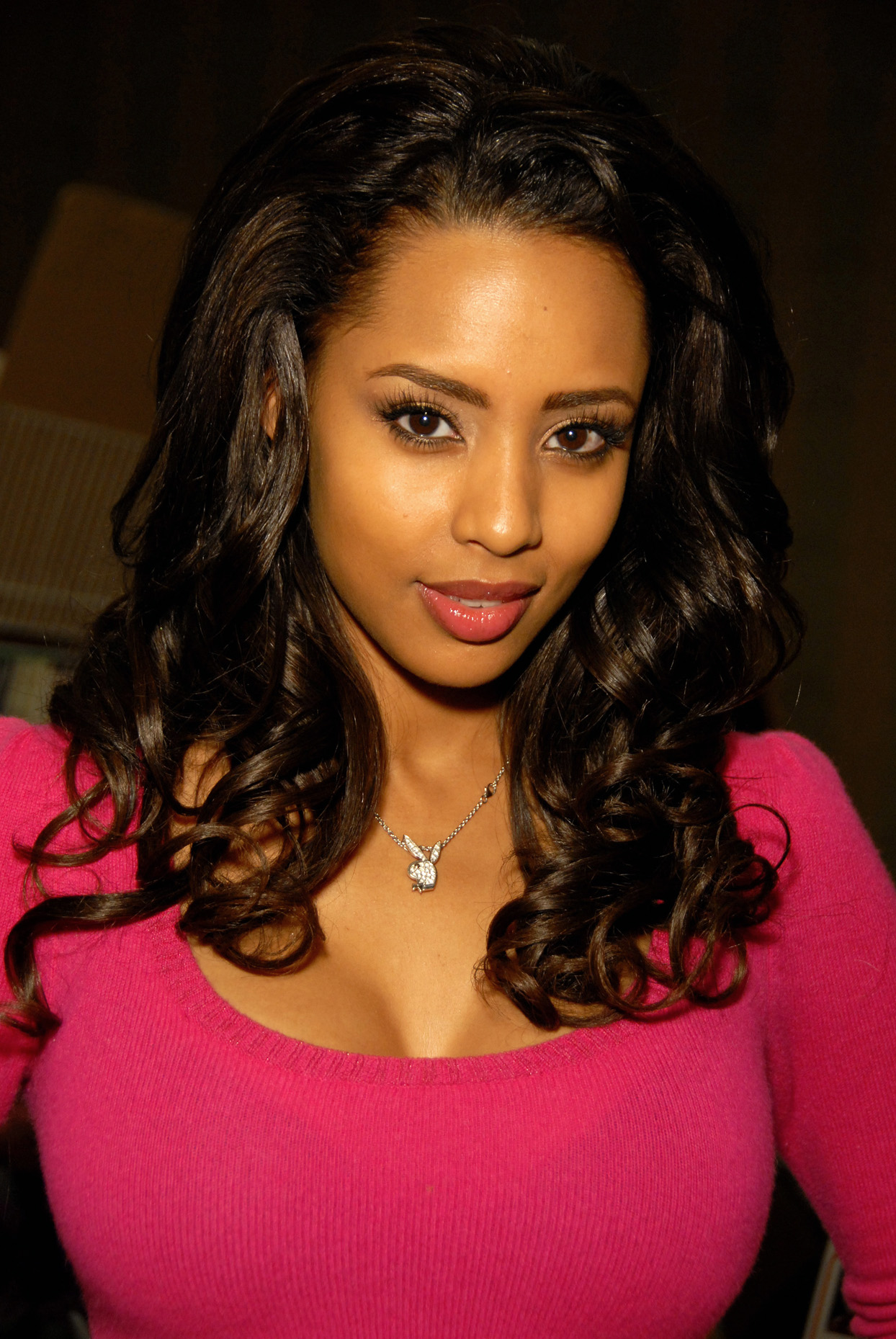
- Ljungqvist in 2010

Playboy Playmate of the Year
- 2009
- Preceded by: Jayde Nicole
- Succeeded by: Hope Dworaczyk

Personal details
- Born: 27 September 1981 (age 44) Tanzania
- Height: 5 ft 4 in (1.63 m)

Ida Ljungqvist (born September 27, 1981) is a Tanzanian-Swedish model. She is Playboy's Playmate of the Month for March 2008 and the 2009 Playmate of the Year. She is the first African-born and second Swedish model to be named a Playmate of the Year.

== April ==
Regina Deutinger

Personal details
- Born: 17 September 1982 (age 43) Munich, West Germany
- Height: 5 ft 9 in (1.75 m)

Regina Deutinger (born 17 September 1982) is a German model and is the Playboy Playmate of the Month for April 2008. She was also Playmate of the Month for the German edition of Playboy in October 2006, known as the "Oktoberfest" (or "Wiesn") playmate. She was born in Munich, West Germany.

== May ==
AJ Alexander

Personal details
- Born: Amanda Jane Herrmann; September 16, 1980 (age 45) Evansville, Indiana, U.S.
- Height: 5 ft 7 in (1.70 m)

Amanda Jane Herrmann(born September 16, 1980) is an American model and actress, better known by her stage name, AJ Alexander. She is the Playmate of the Month for the May 2008 issue of Playboy magazine. She made her film debut in the comedy The Pool Boys, in which she played a deaf DJ.

== June ==
Juliette Fretté

Personal details
- Born: December 25, 1983 (age 42) Santa Clara, California, U.S.
- Height: 5 ft 7 in (1.70 m)

Juliette Rose Fretté (born December 25, 1983) is an American artist, writer, and model. Fretté is the Playmate of the Month for the June 2008 issue of Playboy magazine, and wrote the article text that accompanied her pictures. She first posed for Playboy's October 2005 pictorial, "Girls of the Pac-10". In 2006 she was featured in the Playboy Cyber Club as a Coed of the Week (January) and Coed of the Month (March) under the name "Juliette Rose". She has written commentary for Music and Literature Review, Whitehot Magazine of Contemporary Art, Playboy, and the Huffington Post.

== July ==
Laura Croft

Personal details
- Born: January 30, 1983 (age 43) Jacksonville, Florida, U.S.
- Height: 5 ft 5 in (1.65 m)

Laura Croft (born January 30, 1983) is an American model. She is the Playmate of the Month for the July 2008 issue of Playboy magazine.

== August ==
Kayla Collins

Personal details
- Born: April 1, 1987 (age 39) Reading, Pennsylvania, U.S.
- Height: 5 ft 2 in (1.57 m)

Kayla Collins (born April 1, 1987) is a model. She is the Playmate of the Month for the August 2008 issue of Playboy magazine. She has appeared on several reality television programs, including a regular stint on the ITV reality show 10th Series of the UK version of I'm A Celebrity Get Me Out Of Here. She was born in Reading, Pennsylvania

Kayla Collins is an entrepreneur who plans on developing a business dedicated to highlighting the mental and physical benefits of yoga. "I basically want to introduce more people to yoga and have more people understand how amazing it is", she once explained. "I guess I have a few different things in mind, but I’m very entrepreneurial. I have that kind of spirit. I went to school for business marketing."

== September ==
Valerie Mason

Personal details
- Born: January 29, 1988 (age 38) Monroe, Louisiana, US
- Height: 5 ft 7 in (1.70 m)

Valerie Denise Mason (born January 29, 1988) is an American model. She is Playboy's September 2008 Playmate of the Month. She was born in Monroe, Louisiana.

== October ==
Kelly Carrington
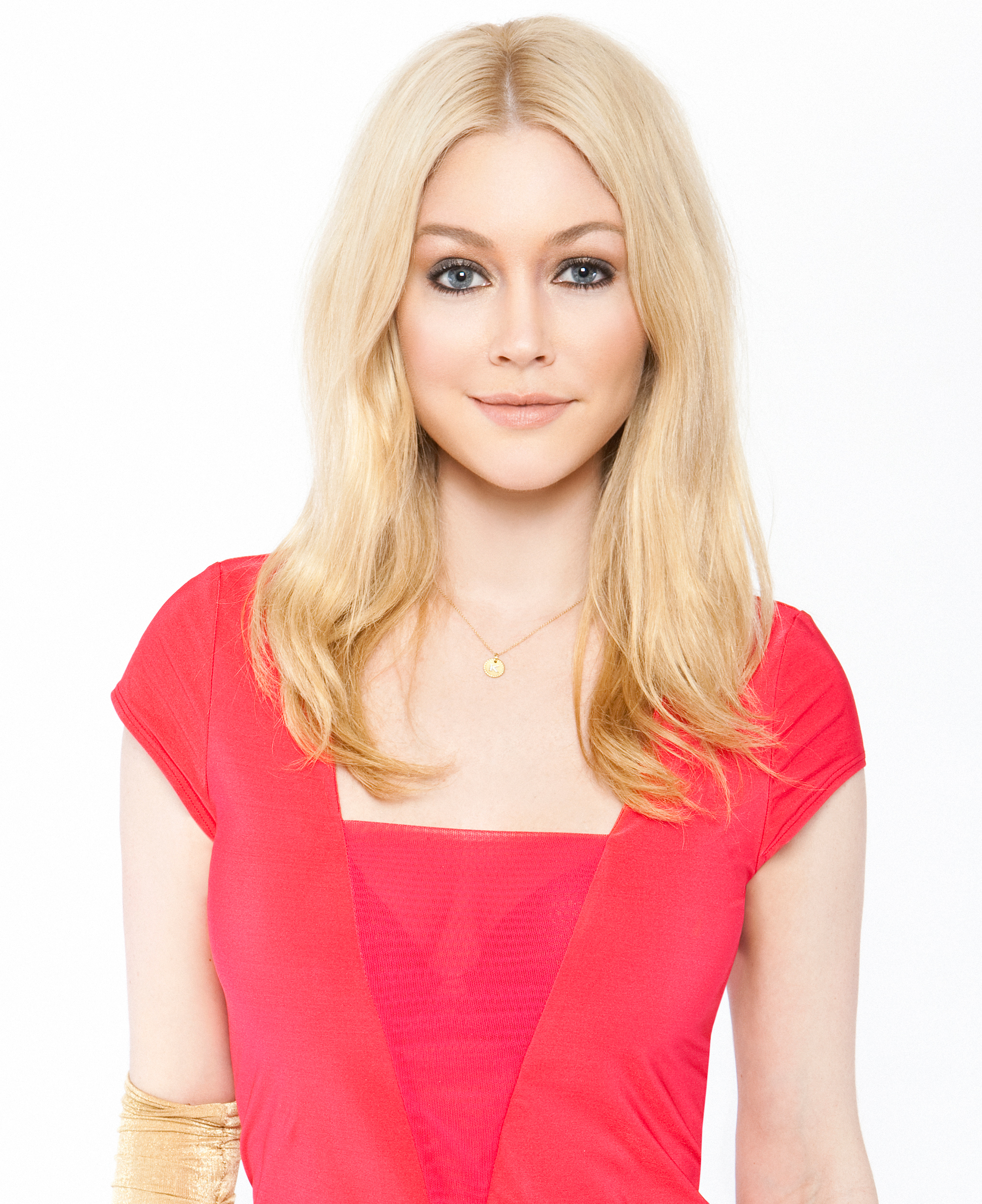

Personal details
- Born: June 24, 1986 (age 39) White Plains, New York, U.S.
- Height: 5 ft 5 in (1.65 m)

Kelly Carrington (born June 24, 1986) is a model. She is Playboy's October 2008 Playmate of the Month. She was also featured on the cover of the same issue. Her centerfold was photographed by Stephen Wayda.

== November ==
Grace Kim

Personal details
- Born: August 20, 1979 (age 46) Los Angeles, California, U.S.
- Height: 5 ft 6 in (1.68 m)

Grace Kim (born August 20, 1979) is an Asian-American model. She is Playboy's November 2008 Playmate of the Month. She was born in Los Angeles. Prior to becoming a Playmate, she wrote promotional copy for the Guitar Hero video game series. She got her bachelor's in English from University of California, Los Angeles and her master's in education from Cal State.

== December ==
Jennifer and Natalie Jo Campbell

Personal details
- Born: August 8, 1986 (age 39) Greeley, Colorado, U.S.
- Height: 5 ft 8 in (1.73 m)

Jennifer and Natalie Jo Campbell (born August 8, 1986) are identical twin sisters and American models. They are Playboy's December 2008 Playmates of the Month and the fifth set of Playmate twins.

== See also ==
- List of people in Playboy 2000–2009

Sandra Nilsson	Michelle McLaughlin	Ida Ljungqvist	Regina Deutinger	A. J. Alexander	Juliette Fretté
Laura Croft	Kayla Collins	Valerie Mason	Kelly Carrington	Grace Kim	Jennifer and Natalie Jo Campbell
