= Kara Monaco =

American model (born 1983)

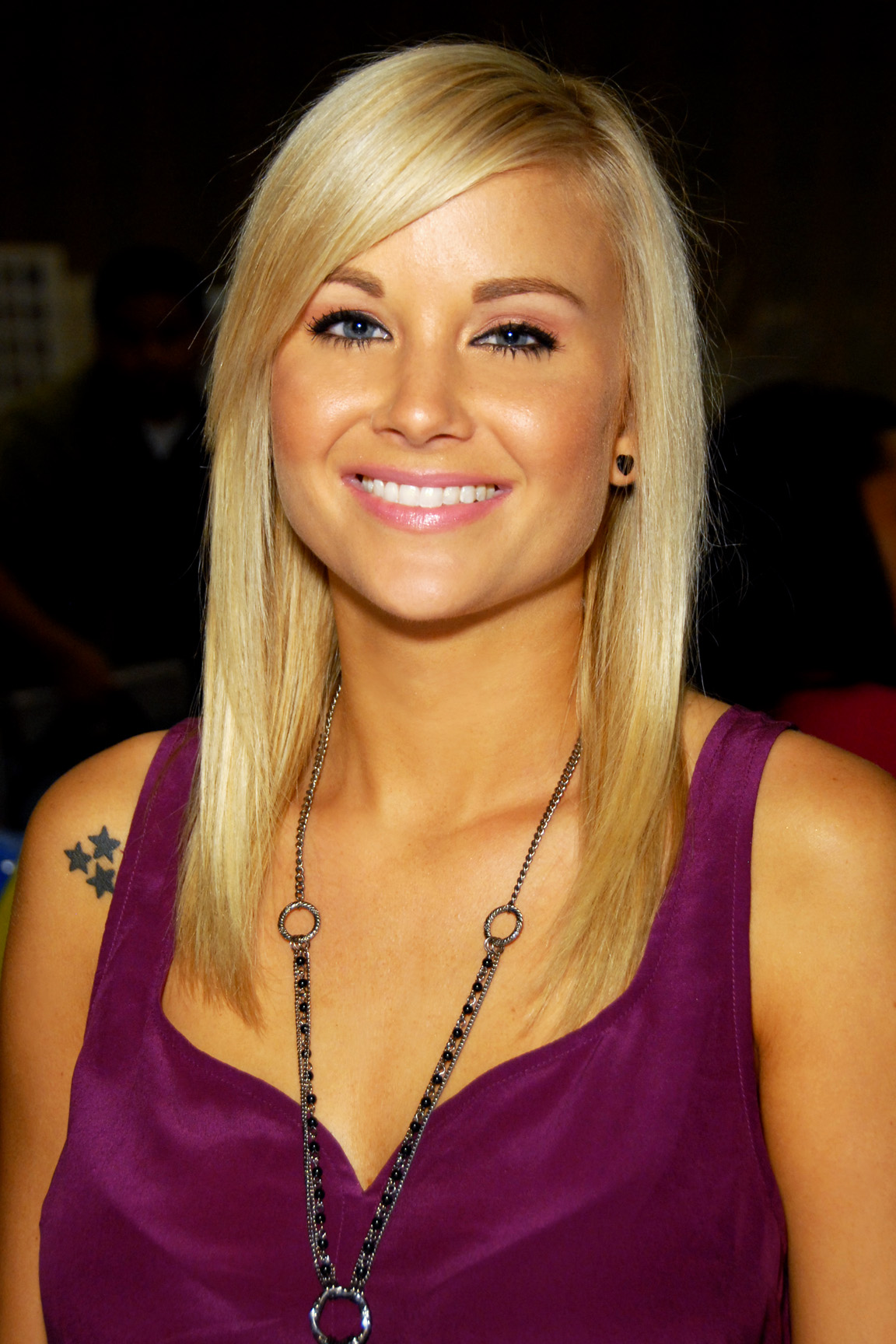
- Monaco in 2010

Playboy centerfold appearance
- June 2005
- Preceded by: Jamie Westenhiser
- Succeeded by: Qiana Chase

Playboy Playmate of the Year
- 2006
- Preceded by: Tiffany Fallon
- Succeeded by: Sara Jean Underwood

Personal details
- Born: February 26, 1983 (age 43) Lakeland, Florida
- Height: 5 ft 7 in (1.70 m)

Kara Monaco (born February 26, 1983) is an American model. She was chosen as Playmate of the Month by Playboy magazine in June 2005. She was named as 2006's Playmate of the Year.

== Early life ==
Kara Monaco was born on February 26, 1983, in Lakeland, Florida. She worked as a bartender, modeled swimwear and was a lingerie model. Monaco is a former competitive gymnast, and has spent time as a dance team coach in addition to her fitness video work. She also worked at Disney World, where she was one of the performers who portrayed characters such as Cinderella and Snow White in the resort. She is not related to fellow model and April 1997 Playboy Playmate Kelly Monaco.

== Career ==
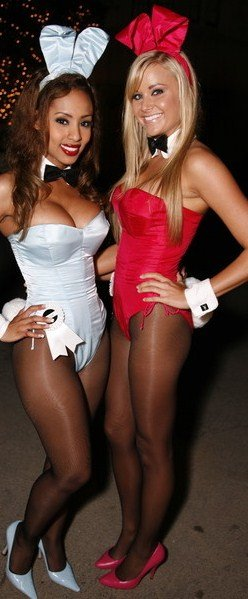
Kara (right) with fellow Playmate Ida Ljungqvist working at a promotional event in the Playboy Mansion.

Monaco has appeared in various reality television series, such as The Girls Next Door, Keeping Up with the Kardashians and Big Brother 14. Besides her Playmate appearance, she has been a part of various other Playboy related media, such as the 2006 Playmates at Play swimsuit calendar and Playboy Special Edition Girls of Summer.

Monaco appeared in FHM and Men's Fitness magazines. Her connection with Playboy began when she was chosen as one of "Playboy's Sexiest Bartenders 2004" and she appeared on the cover of Playboy Special Edition Girls of Summer in August 2004. Later, Monaco was chosen as Playmate of the Month by Playboy magazine for June 2005. That same year, she participated in a home video fitness program, Envy, the name "Vala" (the "V" in "Envy"), and acted together with C.J. Gibson, sister of Playmate Raquel Gibson. In June 2006, she was chosen as Playmate of the Year and later appeared in episodes of the E! reality television series The Girls Next Door which followed the lives of Playboy creator Hugh Hefner and his girlfriends.

In 2006, Monaco also appeared in the game show Identity and the television film Sideliners. She also appeared in the 2006 "Playmates at Play" swimsuit calendar. In 2007, Monaco appeared in three episodes of Up Close with Carrie Keagan; an episode of Model Dating: Hawaii; and on an episode of Jimmy Kimmel Live!, portraying Miss America for a skit. Branching off from reality television, Monaco portrayed Michelle in two episodes of the soap opera Passions. Monaco continued to make guest appearances in The Girls Next Door throughout 2007 and 2008. In 2008, she appeared in three episodes of another reality show, Mind of a Model.

On July 4, 2012, Monaco was revealed to be one of 16 HouseGuests participating in the fourteenth edition of the reality competition series Big Brother. Monaco was mentored by Big Brother 10 winner Dan Gheesling. She was evicted from the show on July 19 which was Day 13 in the house. Monaco was the second person evicted, coming in 15th place.

| Destiny Davis | Amber Campisi | Jillian Grace | Courtney Rachel Culkin | Jamie Westenhiser | Kara Monaco |
| Qiana Chase | Tamara Witmer | Vanessa Hoelsher | Amanda Paige | Raquel Gibson | Christine Smith |
