= Tiffany Fallon =

American model

Playboy centerfold appearance
- December 2004
- Preceded by: Cara Zavaleta
- Succeeded by: Destiny Davis

Playboy Playmate of the Year
- 2005
- Preceded by: Carmella DeCesare
- Succeeded by: Kara Monaco

Personal details
- Born: Tiffany Nicole Fallon; May 1, 1974 (age 52) Fort Lauderdale, Florida, United States
- Height: 5 ft 6 in (1.68 m)

Tiffany Nicole Fallon (born May 1, 1974) is an American model. In 2004, she was photographed by Stephen Wayda for Playboy and was named Playmate of the Month for December 2004. She was also named 2005's Playmate of the Year.

== Career ==
In addition to her work with Playboy, Fallon was a cheerleader for the Atlanta Falcons. Prior to that, she worked as a flight attendant.

== Personal life ==
Fallon is of Irish-American descent. She was Homecoming Queen and senior Class President at her high school where she played volleyball, soccer and ran track. She was Miss Georgia USA in 2001 and also 2nd-runner up for Miss USA in 2001. She has a degree in sports management from Florida State University.

Fallon married Joe Don Rooney, the lead guitarist of country music band Rascal Flatts on April 23, 2006, and she lives in Brentwood, Tennessee. They have three children. She and Rooney separated in 2021. The divorce was finalized in 2023.

== Television appearances ==
- Fallon first appeared in Toby Keith's country music video "Who's Your Daddy?".
- She had made several comedic guest star appearances on Spike TV's The Lance Krall Show.
- Fallon was on an episode of The Simple Life: Interns as a judge for a beauty pageant which Paris Hilton participated in.
- Co-host of the International Fight League's weekly program IFL Battleground with MMA legend, Bas Rutten.
- Fallon competed on The Celebrity Apprentice, playing for charity. She was the first contestant to be fired by Donald Trump.
- Appears in Cletus T Judd's country music video for "I Love Nascar."

Preceded by Patti Dunn	Miss Georgia USA; 2001	Succeeded by Heather Hogan

Colleen Shannon	Aliya Wolf	Sandra Hubby	Krista Kelly	Nicole Whitehead	Hiromi Oshima
Stephanie Glasson	Pilar Lastra	Scarlett Keegan	Kimberly Holland	Cara Zavaleta	Tiffany Fallon
