= List of Playboy Playmates of 2005 =

The following is a list of Playboy Playmates of 2005. Playboy magazine names its Playmate of the Month each month throughout the year.

== January ==
Destiny Davis

Personal details
- Born: August 24, 1985 (age 40) Glendora, California, U.S.
- Height: 5 ft 5 in (165 cm)

Destiny Davis is an American businesswoman and current executive of a real estate investment group in California. She received undergraduate degrees in economics and business law at the University of Nevada, Las Vegas as well as an MBA in Finance from Pepperdine University. While selling residential real estate, Davis appeared on Million Dollar Listing. In her late teens and early twenties, she was a model, and appeared in several episodes of the E! reality television series The Girls Next Door.

== February ==
Amber Campisi
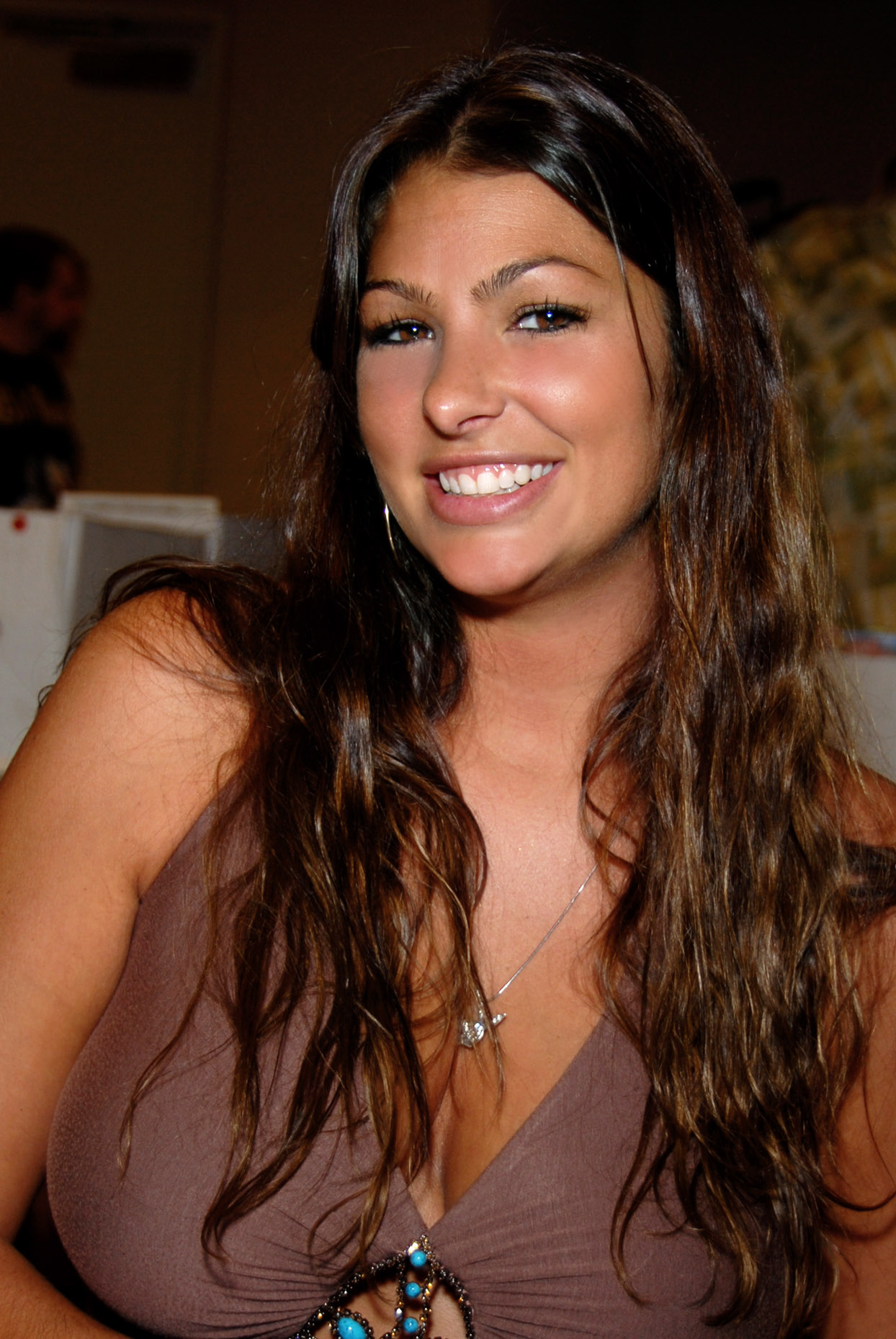
- Campisi at Glamourcon 2007

Personal details
- Born: June 21, 1981 (age 44) Dallas, Texas, U.S.
- Height: 5 ft 6 in (168 cm)

Amber Campisi is an American model. She is Playboy's Playmate of the Month for February 2005. Campisi tried out for Playboy scouts when they were searching for models for The 50th Anniversary Playmate Hunt. She appeared in the accompanying pictorial in the December 2003.

== March ==
Jillian Grace
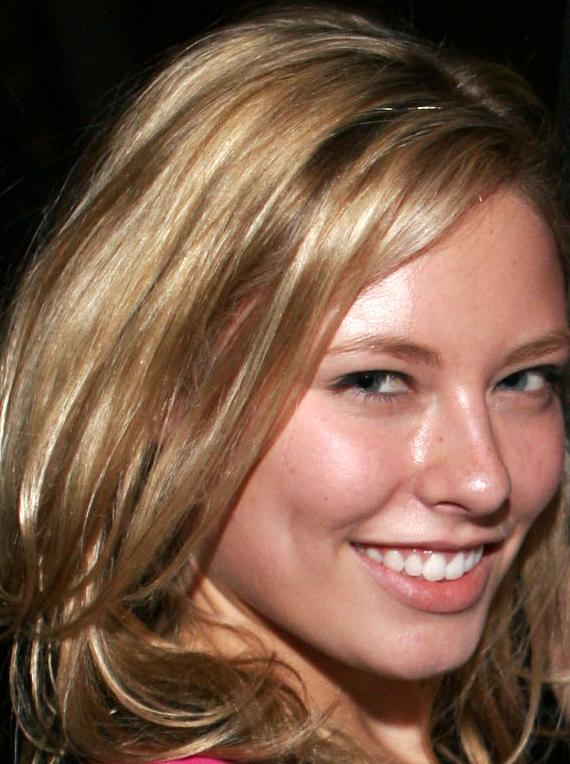

Personal details
- Born: Jillian Grace; December 20, 1985 (age 40) Berryville, Arkansas, U.S.
- Height: 5 ft 5 in (165 cm)

Jillian Grace (born Jillian Grace Harper December 20, 1985, in Conway, Arkansas) is an American model and actress. She is Playboy magazine's Playmate of the Month for March 2005.

On August 26, 2008, Grace gave birth to a daughter; the father is actor David Spade. As of 2019, Grace and her daughter live outside St. Louis, Missouri.

== April ==
Courtney Rachel Culkin

Personal details
- Born: February 23, 1983 (age 42) Long Island, New York, U.S.
- Height: 5 ft 3 in (160 cm)

Courtney Rachel Culkin is an American model. She is Playboy magazine's Playmate of the Month for April 2005. Culkin tried out for Playboy scouts when they were searching for models for The 50th Anniversary Playmate Hunt. She appeared in the accompanying pictorial in the December 2003 issue. Her centerfold was photographed by Arny Freytag.

== May ==
Jamie Westenhiser

Personal details
- Born: November 2, 1981 (age 44) Hollywood, Florida, U.S.
- Height: 5 ft 7 in (170 cm)

Jamie Westenhiser is an American model from Florida. She was the Playboy Playmate of the Month for May 2005. Prior to becoming a Playmate, she was a member of the National Bikini Team (NBT) and a Hawaiian Tropic model.

== June ==
Kara Monaco
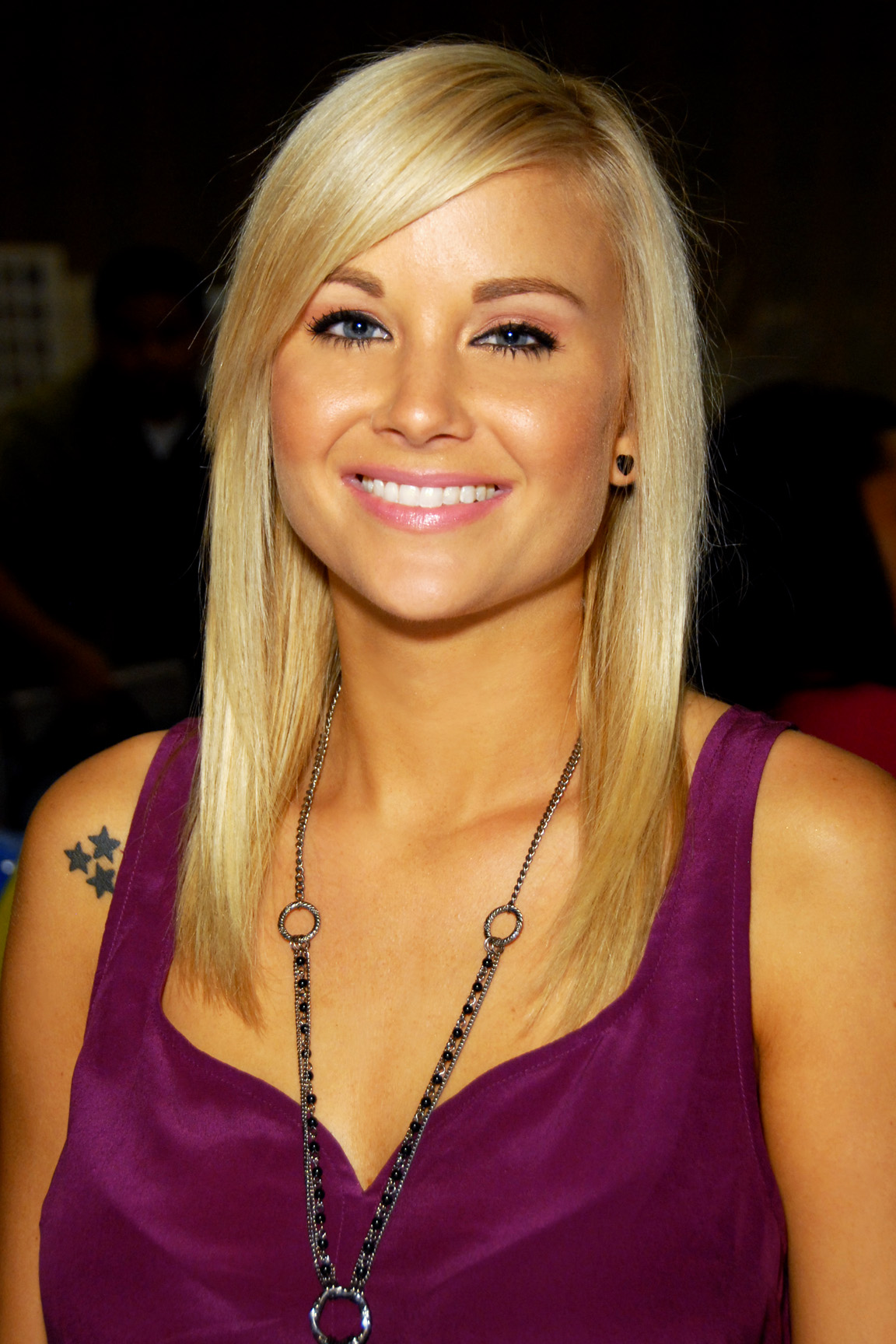
- Monaco at Glamourcon in 2010

Playboy Playmate of the Year
- 2006
- Preceded by: Tiffany Fallon
- Succeeded by: Sara Jean Underwood

Personal details
- Born: Kara Monaco; February 26, 1983 (age 42) Lakeland, Florida, U.S.
- Height: 5 ft 6 in (168 cm)

Kara Monaco (born February 26, 1983, in Lakeland, Florida) is an American model. She is Playboy magazine's Playmate of the Month for June, 2005. She appeared on the cover of the June 2006 issue of Playboy as the 2006 Playmate of the Year.

== July ==
Qiana Chase
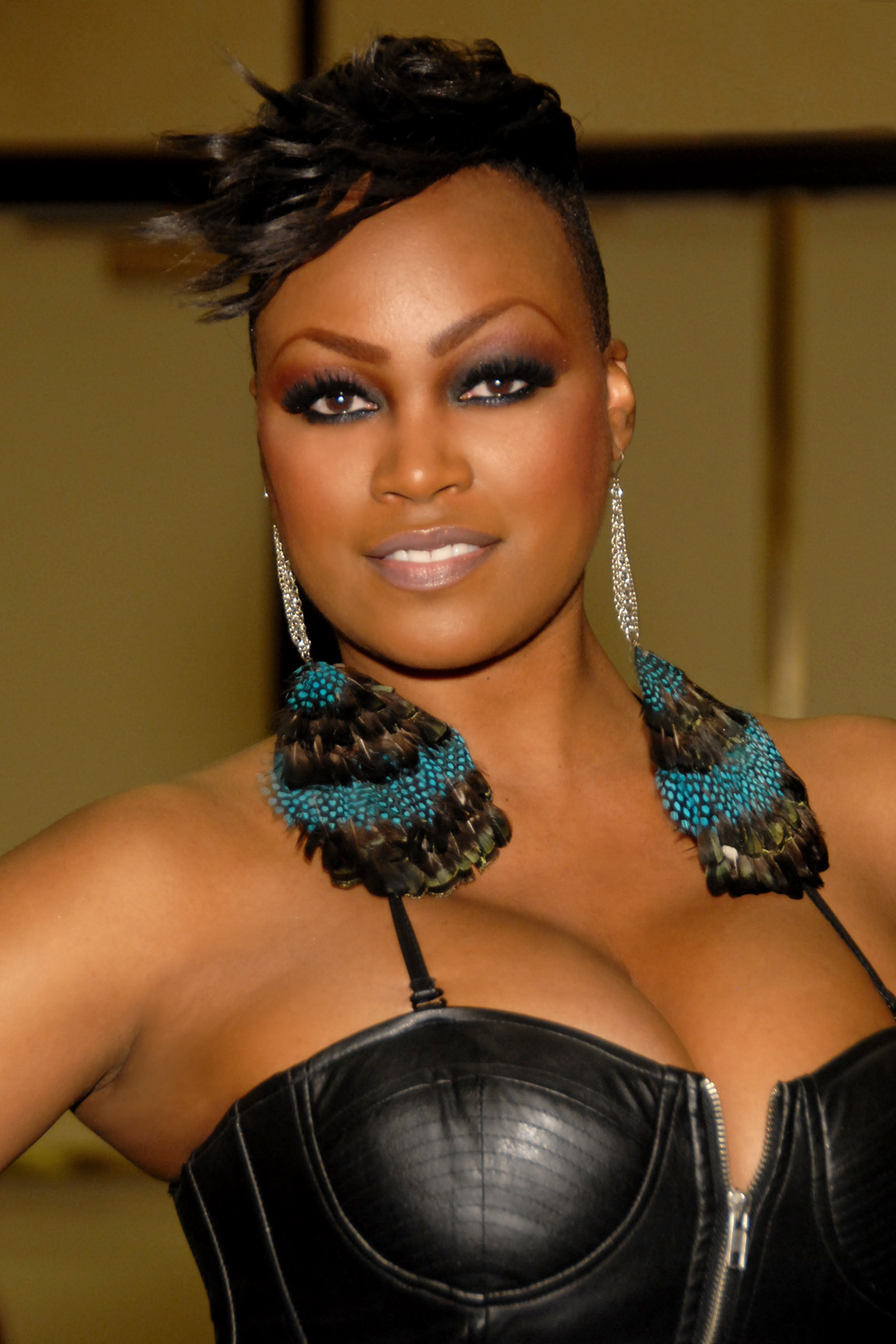
- Chase in 2011

Personal details
- Born: Qiana Chase; February 12, 1981 (age 45) Los Angeles, California, U.S.
- Height: 5 ft 9 in (175 cm)

Qiana Chase is an American model. She is Playboy's Playmate of the Month for July 2005. Chase tried out for Playboy scouts during The 50th Anniversary Playmate Hunt. She appeared in the accompanying pictorial in the December 2003 issue.

== August ==
Tamara Witmer
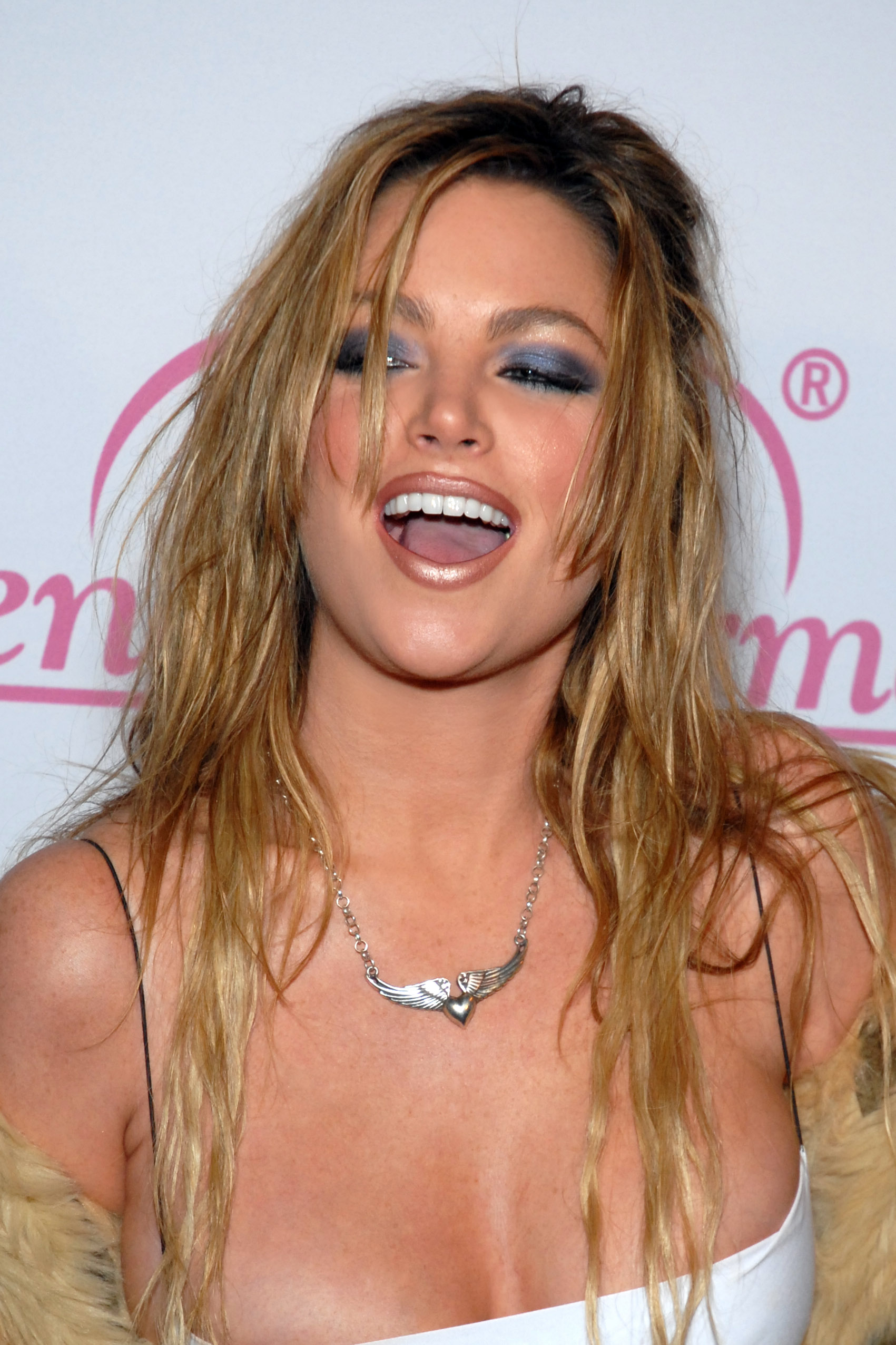
- Witmer attending the Benchwarmer Valentines Party at Area, Hollywood in 2008

Personal details
- Born: Tamara Lynn Witmer; March 21, 1984 (age 41) Valencia, California, U.S.
- Height: 5 ft 8 in (173 cm)

Tamara Witmer is an American model, actress and reality television star. She is best known as Playboy's Playmate of the Month, Miss August 2005, and was also the cover girl for the October 2006 issue.

== September ==
Vanessa Hoelsher

Personal details
- Born: January 19, 1982 (age 44) Atlanta, Georgia, U.S.
- Height: 5 ft 6 in (168 cm)

Vanessa Hoelsher is Playboys Playmate of the Month for September 2005.

== October ==
Amanda Paige
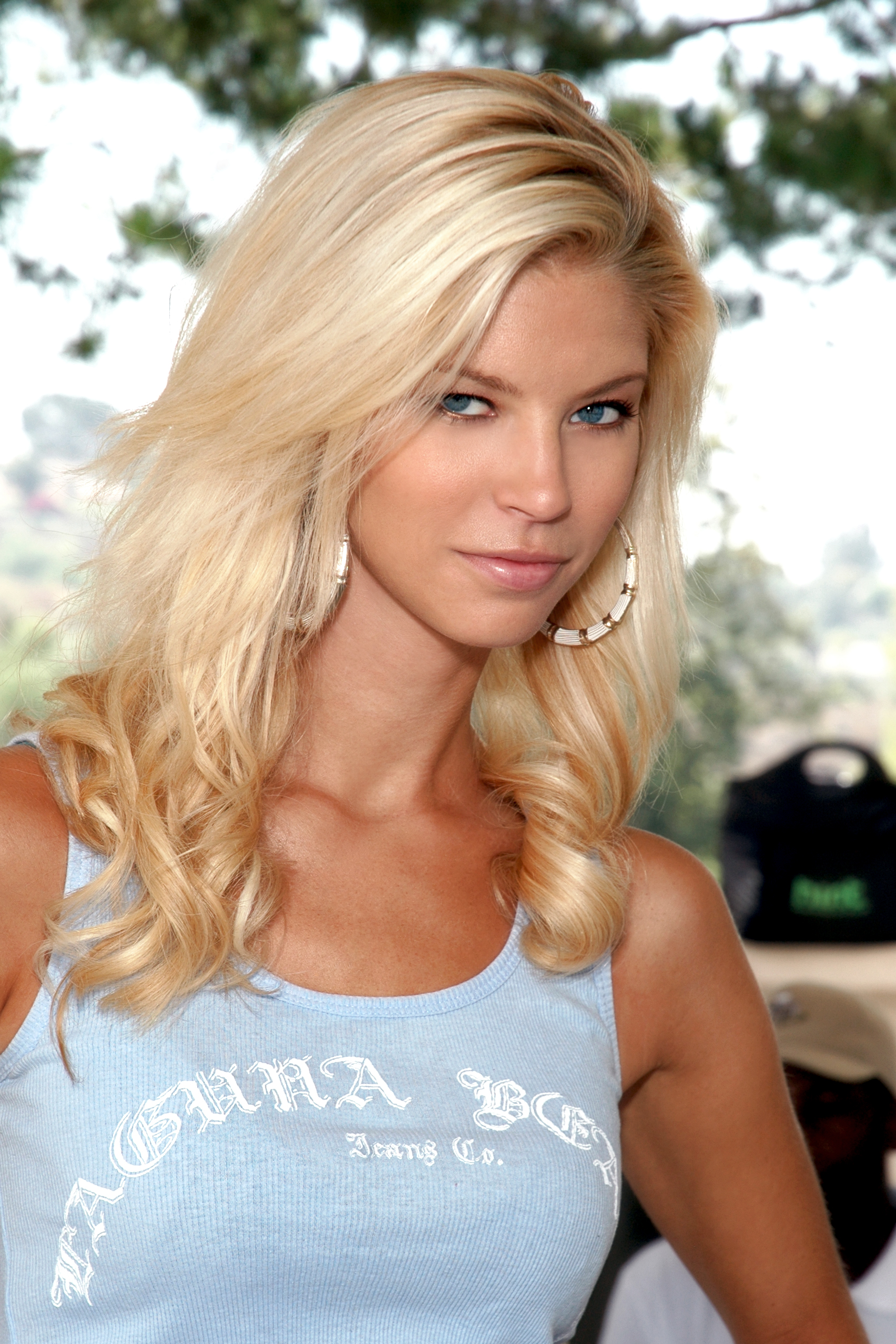
- Paige at a charity event in 2008

Personal details
- Born: Amanda Paige Blair; October 28, 1984 (age 41) Fayetteville, North Carolina, U.S.
- Height: 5 ft 8 in (173 cm)

Amanda Paige (born Amanda Paige Blair October 28, 1984) also known as Amanda Paige Gellar and Paige Gellar, is an American attorney and former model. She was Playboy's Playmate of the Month for October 2005, and was the cover model for the September 2007 issue. She received a B.A. in sociology from the University of Virginia in 2006 and received a J.D. from the University of Richmond School of Law in 2012. She is admitted to practice law in Virginia.

== November ==
Raquel Gibson
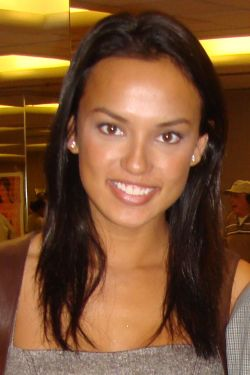

Personal details
- Born: June 14, 1985 (age 40) Clearwater, California, U.S.
- Height: 5 ft 4 in (163 cm)

Raquel Gibson is an American model and actress of Filipino and Italian descent. Gibson is Playboy magazine's Playmate of the Month for November 2005. Gibson has a culinary school degree from Chef Jean-Pierre Cooking School in Florida and speaks Tagalog and Japanese. Her older sister, CJ Gibson, is also a model.

== December ==
Christine Smith
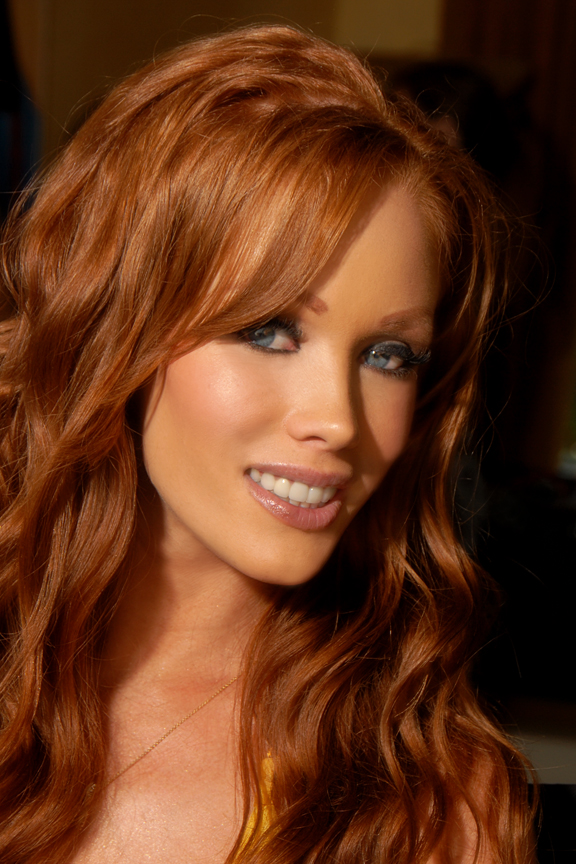
- Smith in 2009

Personal details
- Born: April 6, 1979 (age 46) San Dimas, California, U.S.
- Height: 5 ft 5 in (165 cm)

Christine Smith is Playboys Playmate of the Month for December, 2005. In October 2008, Smith appeared in a presidential election spoof video for Funny or Die.com. In 2011, she played a minor role in the movie Bad Teacher.

== See also ==
- List of people in Playboy 2000–2009

| Destiny Davis | Amber Campisi | Jillian Grace | Courtney Rachel Culkin | Jamie Westenhiser | Kara Monaco |
| Qiana Chase | Tamara Witmer | Vanessa Hoelsher | Amanda Paige | Raquel Gibson | Christine Smith |
