= African-American upper class =

Social class

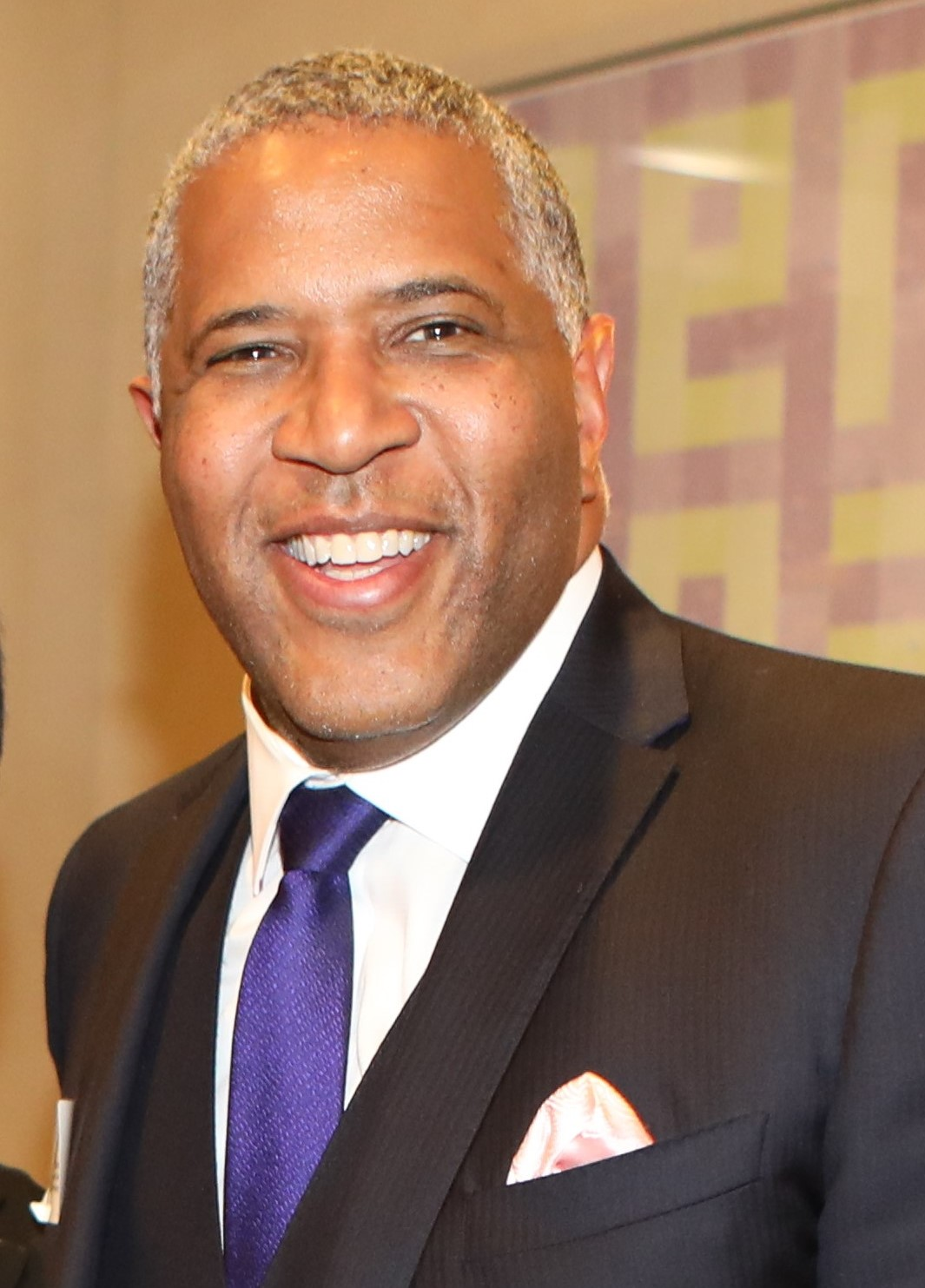
Robert Smith

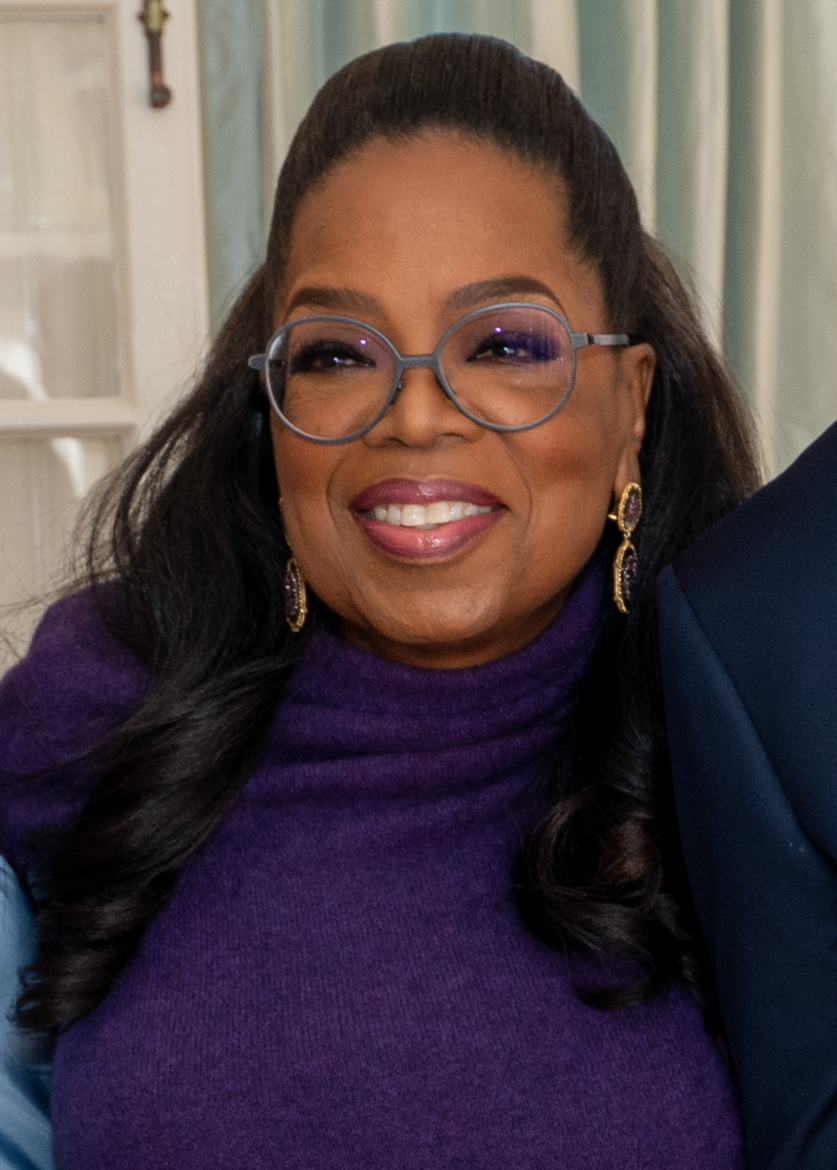
Oprah Winfrey

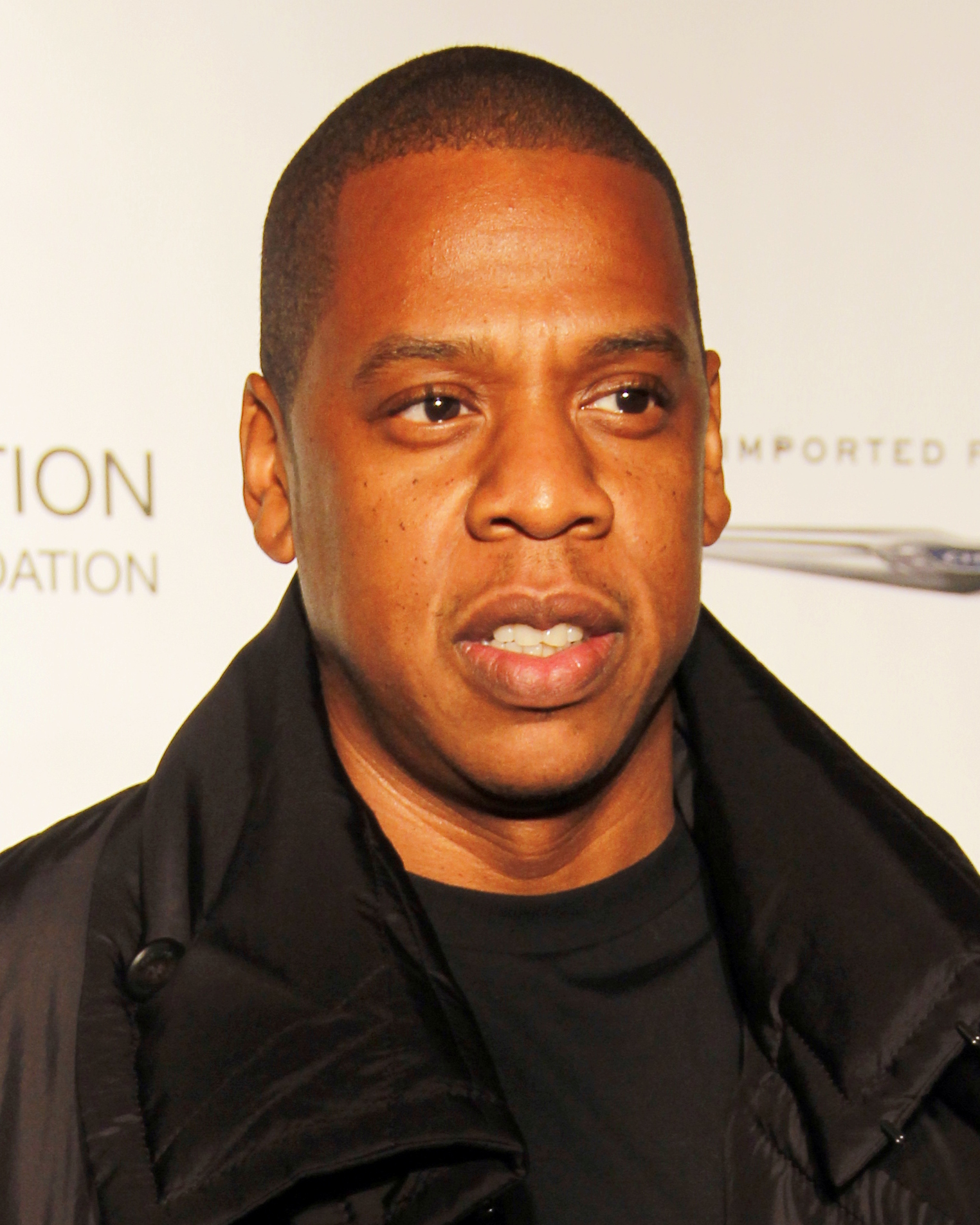
Jay-Z

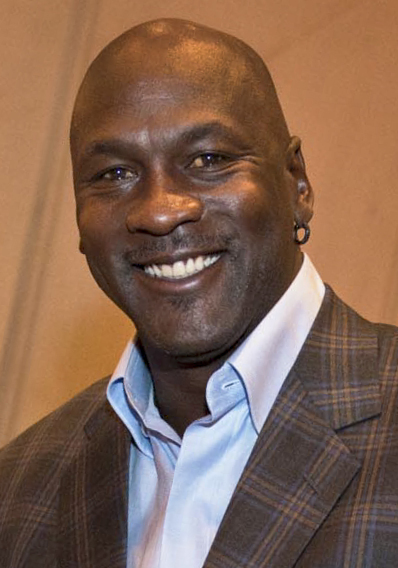
Michael Jordan

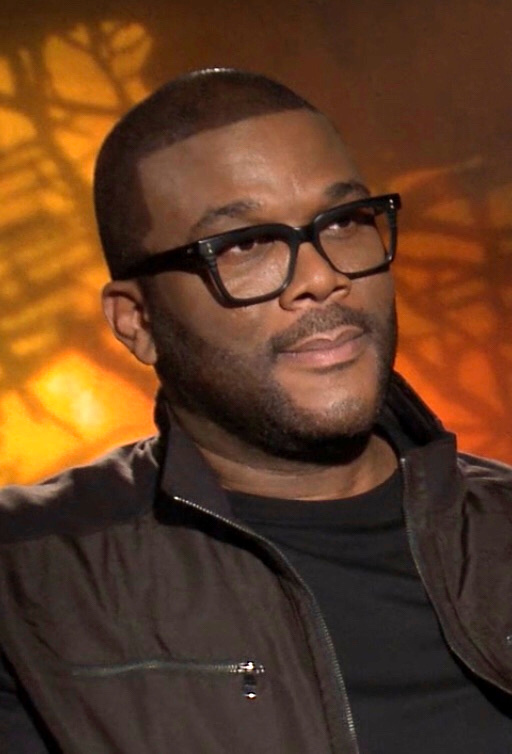
Tyler Perry

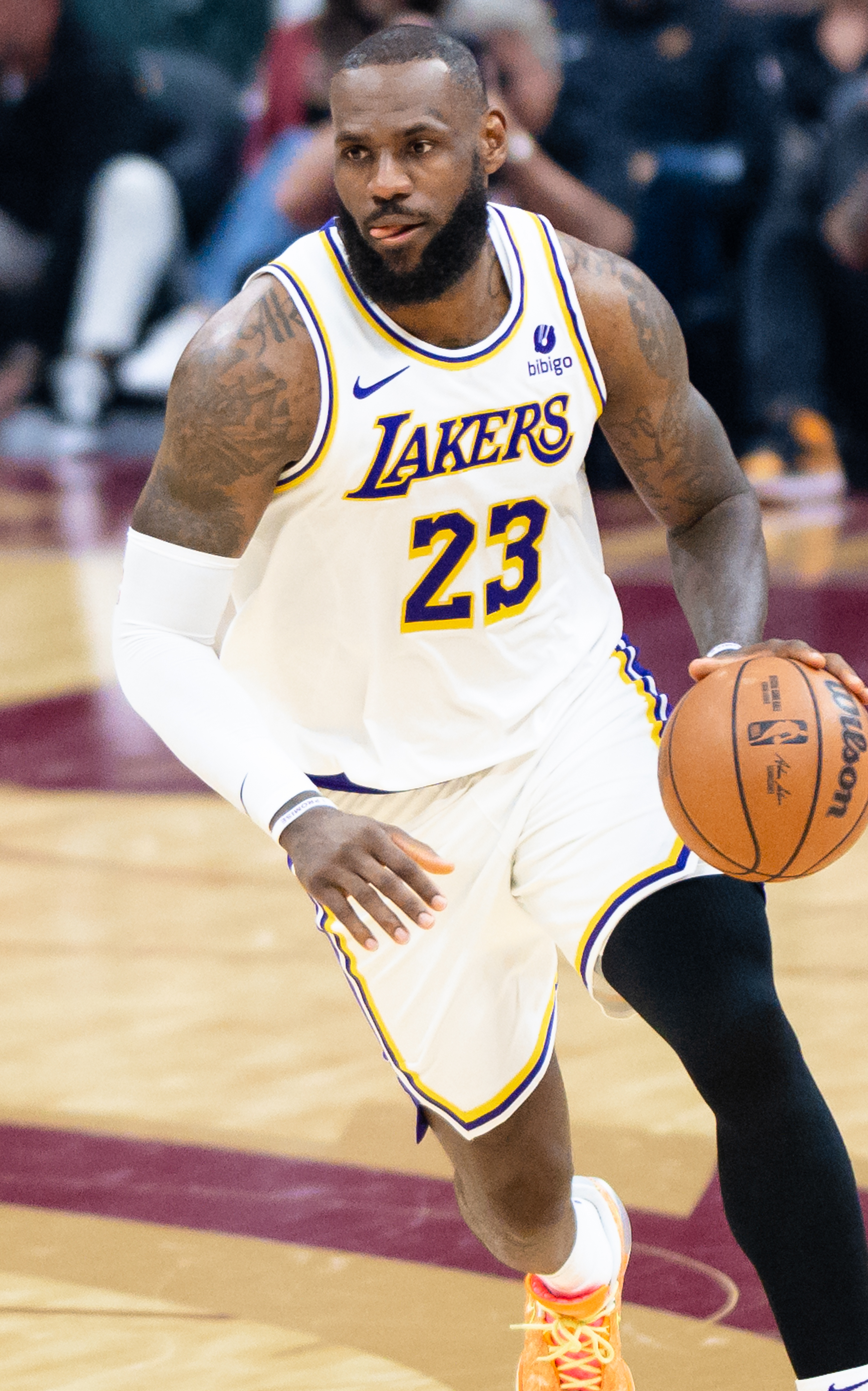
LeBron James

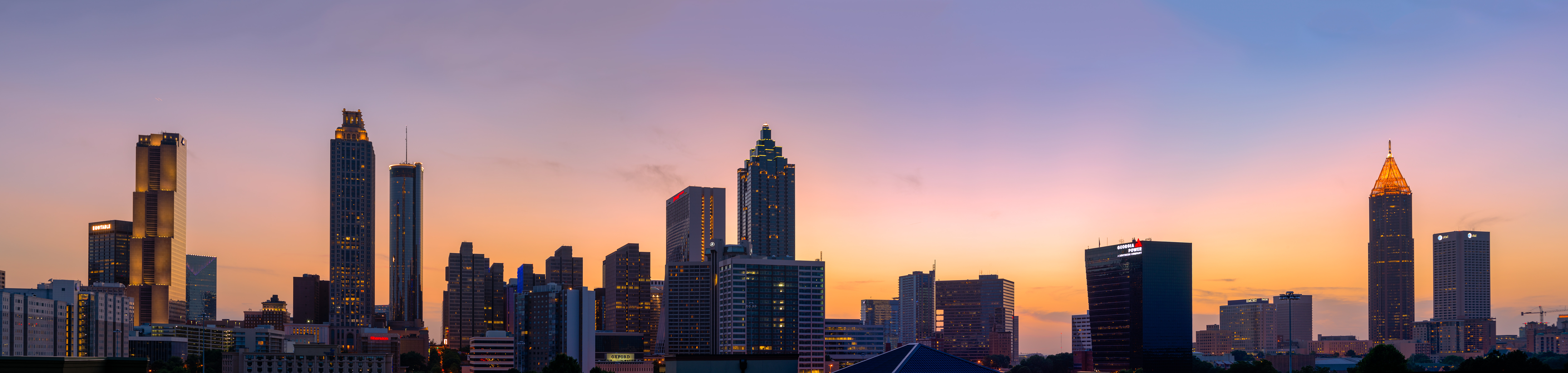
Atlanta has the most black millionaires in the United States.

The African-American upper class, sometimes referred to as the black upper class or black elite, is a social class that consists of African-American individuals who have high disposable incomes and high net worth. The group includes highly paid white-collar professionals such as academics, engineers, lawyers, accountants, doctors, politicians, business executives, venture capitalists, CEOs, celebrities, entertainers, entrepreneurs and heirs.

This group of black people has a history of organizations and activities that distinguish it from other classes within the black community, as well as from the white upper class. Many of these traditions, which have persisted for several generations, are discussed in Lawrence Otis Graham's 2000 book, Our Kind of People: Inside America's Black Upper Class. Scholarship on this class from a sociological perspective is generally traced to E. Franklin Frazier's Black Bourgeoisie (first edition in English in 1957 translated from the 1955 French original).

Today, the African American upper class exists throughout the United States, particularly in the Northeast and in the South, with the largest contiguous majority black high income neighborhoods being in the Washington, DC metropolitan area, particularly in Prince George's County and Charles County. Majority black high income neighborhoods are also found in the New York, Los Angeles, Chicago, Houston, Miami, Charlotte, San Antonio, Dallas, and Atlanta metropolitan areas.

David Steward is considered the richest African American person in the United States. He is the founder of World Wide Technology, a technology services company based in St. Louis.

== Historical background ==
When enslaved Africans were brought to the Americas in the 17th and 18th centuries, there began to be mixed-race children of African and European descent in the Americas. Then called "mulattoes", they were sometimes not enslaved by their white slave-holding fathers and comprised a large part of the free black population in the South. In addition, numbers of Africans escaped to freedom during the American Revolution. Others were manumitted by their enslavers. The free black community in the US had therefore increased considerably by 1800, and although most of them were very poor, some were fortunate enough to own farmland or to learn mechanical or artistic trades.

Some people escaped slavery and served in the American Civil War (1861–1865) for the Union.

Following the outbreak of the Civil War, abolitionists such as Frederick Douglass claimed that enlisting Black soldiers would strengthen the North in winning the war and would be a significant step forward in the fight for equal rights: "Once let the Black man get upon his person the brass letters, U.S.; let him get an eagle on his button, and a musket on his shoulder and bullets in his pocket," Douglass said, "and there is no power on earth which can deny that he has earned the right to citizenship." This is just what President Lincoln feared: He was concerned that arming African Americans, particularly former or escaped slaves, might lead to the loyal border states declaring independence. As a result, the Union's chances of winning the war would be slim to none.

Other former slaves, often mixed-race former house slaves who shared ancestry with their onetime owners and had acquired marketable skills such as cooking and tailoring, worked in domestic fields or opened small businesses such as restaurants and catering firms. Some free blacks in the North also founded small businesses and even newspapers. They were able to get a head-start on the blacks who were essentially still enslaved by their lack of access to wealth accumulation, particularly when it came to owning their own land.

== History of college education ==
Children of skilled former slaves who had been able to establish businesses or farms in the post-war period, often became alumni of historically black colleges and universities (HBCUs). HBCUs played a vital role in promoting social mobility and increasing wealth for Black Americans, enabling them to pursue more lucrative careers as skilled professionals, including doctors, lawyers, educators, nurses, engineers, scientists, mathematicians, accountants, and more. While today there are well over 100 HBCUs in the US, the mid-to-late 1800s established private HBCUs have consistently been the favorites for upper-class blacks. In particular, Howard University (1867), Morehouse College (1867), Clark Atlanta University (1865), Fisk University (1866), Hampton University (1868), Dillard University (1869), Tuskegee University (1881), and Spelman College (1881), have historically been heavily favored by the Black intelligentsia due to their selectivity, academic offerings, decorated black professors, name recognition, networking opportunities, black cultural enrichment, and cost in comparison to the typical private predominately white colleges.

However, since integration, many children of the black upper class have attended popular predominantly non-black colleges and universities. "In the first time period covered by the scholars, black colleges were attracting significant numbers of students from professional, middle-class black families. [These people] are now the students who are cherry-picked by highly selective, prestigious institutions that weren't looking for them in the 1970s", said Michael L. Lomax, president of the United Negro College Fund.

A small number of free blacks during the 19th century were also admitted into private, predominately white institutions such as Harvard and Amherst.

== Greek organizations ==
In 1904, Sigma Pi Phi fraternity, also known as "The Boulè", was established as the first Greek-letter fraternity for African Americans. It admitted only African-American men who were college graduates, had gained considerable achievement within their chosen industries, and measured as having good character. The fraternity is not present as an undergraduate fraternity. Within a decade, African American undergraduate college students established fraternities and sororities as small, selective social groups that later developed an emphasis on scholarship and social activism. Occasionally, alumni members of an undergraduate fraternity are invited to join Sigma Pi Phi as mid-career adults. Pi Gamma Omicron, founded in 1905 at Ohio State University, was one of the first documented Black collegiate fraternities.

Alpha Phi Alpha fraternity at Cornell University in 1906 was established as the first African-American intercollegiate fraternity. Today there are a total of nine historically black sororities and fraternities that make up the National Pan-Hellenic Council, sometimes referred to as the "Divine Nine". These include Alpha Phi Alpha (1906), Alpha Kappa Alpha (1908), Kappa Alpha Psi (1911), Omega Psi Phi (1911), Delta Sigma Theta (1913), Phi Beta Sigma (1914), Zeta Phi Beta (1920), Sigma Gamma Rho (1922), and Iota Phi Theta (1963).

Some argue that historically black Greek organizations differ from those that are traditionally all-white, because of their importance to blacks long after they have left their respective colleges and universities. Graham said in his book Our Kind of People: Inside America's Black Upper Class that these sororities and fraternities "are a lasting identity, a circle of lifetime friends, a base for future political and civic activism".

== Social and family organizations ==
Over the years, the black upper class has also founded numerous other organizations that allow them to socialize, build networks and get involved in communities.

=== Notable organizations ===
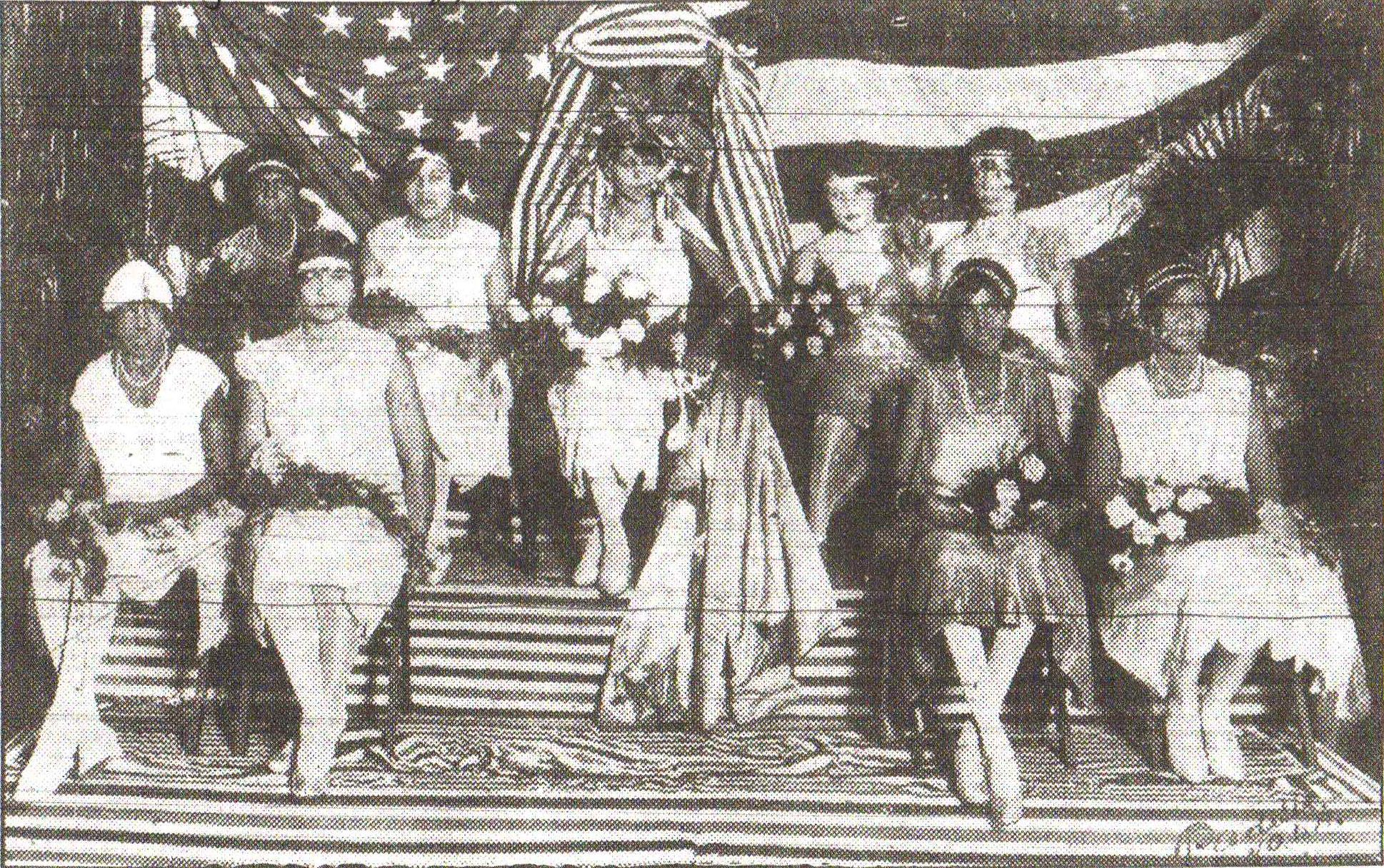
Black debutantes at the Young Men's Illinois Club Ball in New Orleans in 1927

One of the most notable is Jack and Jill of America, Inc., a mothers' club for African-American women founded in Philadelphia, Pennsylvania in 1938. It was created by a group of middle and upper middle class mothers who wanted to bring their children together to experience a variety of educational, social and cultural opportunities, which, due to segregation and racism, were not otherwise readily available to African-American children, regardless of the socio-economic status of their parents. As of 2000 there were around 218 chapters across the US and the world with about 9,500 members. Separated into age groups, children attend monthly activities extensively planned by the mothers of that age group, which may include philanthropic endeavors, community service, pool parties, ski weekends, theater, museums, lectures, and college tours. Membership is by invitation only and, even then, not guaranteed due to the extensive candidate selection process, which may last a year or longer and may include a vote by existing members. Membership is limited to mothers of children between the ages of 2–19. Annual costs of membership, including dues and activity fees, may easily reach thousands of dollars. Cory Booker's mother was a member and Booker participated in activities.

The Links, Incorporated, founded in 1946, is an invitation-only social service organization for women that requires each member to accumulate many volunteer hours. It is known for numerous annual social activities, including debutante cotillions, fashion show luncheons, auctions, and balls. Women interested in joining any of the local chapters must be nominated by a current member. Members include philanthropists, college presidents, judges, doctors, bankers, lawyers, executives, educators or the wives of well-known public figures including Kamala Harris, Marian Wright Edelman, and Betty Shabazz. As of 2008 there were about 12,000 members in 273 chapters in 42 states.

The 100 Black Men of America was founded in 1963 in New York City. The organization has chapters across the US and internationally, and is primarily composed of college-degreed black men. Its primary mission is to improve the quality of life within their communities and enhance educational and economic opportunities for all African-Americans. It currently has over 10,000 members.

The National Coalition of 100 Black Women was founded in 1970 in New York City. The organization has chapters across the US and its membership is primarily composed of black women who have college degrees. It advocates on behalf of black women and girls, as well as promotes leadership development and gender equity in health, education, and economic empowerment.

=== Other social and family organizations ===
The Girl Friends, Incorporated is a social organization of African American women. It was founded in 1927 during the Harlem Renaissance by a small group of close friends. As of 2016, the organization included more than 1,700 members in 47 chapters in cities across the country. Although the original concept was purely social, over the years, The Girl Friends, Incorporated expanded to include charitable and cultural activities. In 1989, the Girl Friends Fund founded a separate 501(c)3 organization to provide financial assistance to students countrywide.

The National Smart Set is a private social club founded in 1937 in Washington, DC. Members are African-American women who are leaders in their professions and, often, leaders of other respected and notable clubs and organizations. There are 700 members in 26 chapters. Each of the 26 local chapters provides philanthropic services and financial support to causes within the geographic region. At the national level, the organization donates to member-agreed causes including the MLK Memorial, Smithsonian's National Museum of African-American History and Culture, NAACP Legal Defense Fund, Lupus Foundation, and the Hampton University Proton Therapy Institute. Membership to the National Smart Set is by invitation and the organization seeks to contain its size to ensure that members develop and nurture nation-wide bonds and relationships.

National Tots and Teens, Incorporated is another well-noted family organization. It is unique in that fathers hold membership with mothers; single father-headed households are eligible for membership. Tots and Teens was founded by Geraldine Jacoway-Ross of Los Angeles, California in May 1952. In 1953 its second chapter was organized in Baltimore, Maryland. Ross wanted to expose her daughter and other youths to experiences they would not otherwise be exposed to. Tots and Teens holds a variety of activities for youth and parents such as ski trips, debutante cotillions, volunteer projects, and cultural events. Membership is by invitation only and requires two families for sponsorship and the first year the family is viewed as a prospective member without full membership status.

Twigs, Incorporated was founded by Clara J. Bostic in Yeadon (Philadelphia) in 1948 as "an association whose objective is to encourage and foster mental, physical, social and cultural development of the children who are members." The organization is national in scope and sponsors a wide variety of activities. It has sponsored ACT/SAT prep sessions, book fairs geared toward African-American children, and leadership development for Twigs youth groups. Twigs has sponsored an annual scholarship competition through its chapters for community youth graduating from high school and continuing their education at four-year institutions. The organization has an archival repository housed at the Historical Society of Pennsylvania.

Other prominent women's groups include Chums, Incorporated; Knights of Peter Claver & Ladies Auxiliary; Continental Societies, Inc.; the Drifters, Inc.; the CARATS, Incorporated; the Moles, Inc.; the Pierians; the Carrousels; Top Ladies of Distinction (TLOD); The National Association of Negro Business and Professional Women's Club, Inc.; National Women of Achievement, Inc.; and the Northeasterners.

A few organizations have been founded specifically for upper class black men. Some of these include the Comus Social Club, the What Good Are We Social Club a.k.a. "The Whats" (Howard University, Washington, DC), the Reveille Club, the Hellians (Washington, DC; Baltimore, Maryland; and Jackson, Mississippi), the Chesterfield Club of Selma, Alabama the Thebans, the Tux Club, the Consorts, Bachelor-Benedict Club, the National Association of Guardsmen, the El Dorado Club of Houston, Texas, and the Bonanza Social Club of Baton Rouge, Louisiana.

== Home ownership rates ==
According to a 2007 estimate, 80 percent of upper-class blacks own their own homes. This is compared to 66 percent of all Americans earning more than $50,000 and 52 percent of those who earn between $30,000 and $49,999 in income.

== Notable black business districts during segregation ==
The following are a few black business districts, areas, and cities that swelled with success during the era of legal segregation, which also contributed to the rise of the African-American upper class.

- U Street, NW in Washington, D.C.
- Pennsylvania Avenue in Baltimore, Maryland
- "Black Wall Street" in Tulsa, Oklahoma
- "Sweet" Auburn Avenue in Atlanta, Georgia
- Harlem, New York
- South side of Chicago, Illinois
- Central Avenue, Los Angeles
- "The Deuce" in Richmond, Virginia
- Black Bottom in Detroit, Michigan (also called "Paradise Valley")
- "Black Wall Street" in Durham, North Carolina
- Indiana Avenue, Indianapolis, Indiana
- Riverside Terrace, Houston
- Black Doctors Row, in Philadelphia, Pennsylvania
- Five Points, in Denver, Colorado
- Black Business District, Walnut Street, Louisville, Kentucky

== Criticism ==
Academic Donald Earl Collins has criticized members of the black middle- and upper-classes for having attitudes and values similar to their white counterparts. Some in the black community have been very critical of the black upper class community, in particular after the release of Graham's book Our Kind of People. Darren Walker of the Rockefeller Foundation says that the behaviors of the black upper classes exclude many from the privileges the group enjoys, arguing "one part of our community seems quite comfortable adopting the exclusive practices of the majority community that for many years kept us out."

Black individuals in upper-class status often lack the wealth and assets possessed by their non-black peers in upper-class status. Blacks were significantly underrepresented on the 2024 Forbes list of the 400 richest Americans, with only four individuals (1%) included.

== Notable people ==
As of 2020, a Forbes Billionaire ranking demonstrated that there were 7 African American billionaires in the United States. The list included former athlete and sports executive Michael Jordan, financier Robert F. Smith, talk show host, actress and media proprietor Oprah Winfrey, rapper and music executive Jay-Z, actor and TV and film producer Tyler Perry, and tech businessman David Steward. Rapper and fashion designer Kanye West was also included at the time, but is currently a multi-millionaire.

== See also ==
- Affluence in the United States
- African-American middle class
- American upper class
- Black Ivy League
- Black billionaires
- Black elite
- Black mecca
- Brown Paper Bag Test
- Cultural liberalism
- Historically black colleges and universities
- Negroland: A Memoir
- Social class in the United States
- The Talented Tenth
