= TBX =

TBX may refer to:

- TBX (company)
- TermBase eXchange
- ICAO code for Tobago Express
