= Hope Dworaczyk Smith =

American Playboy model

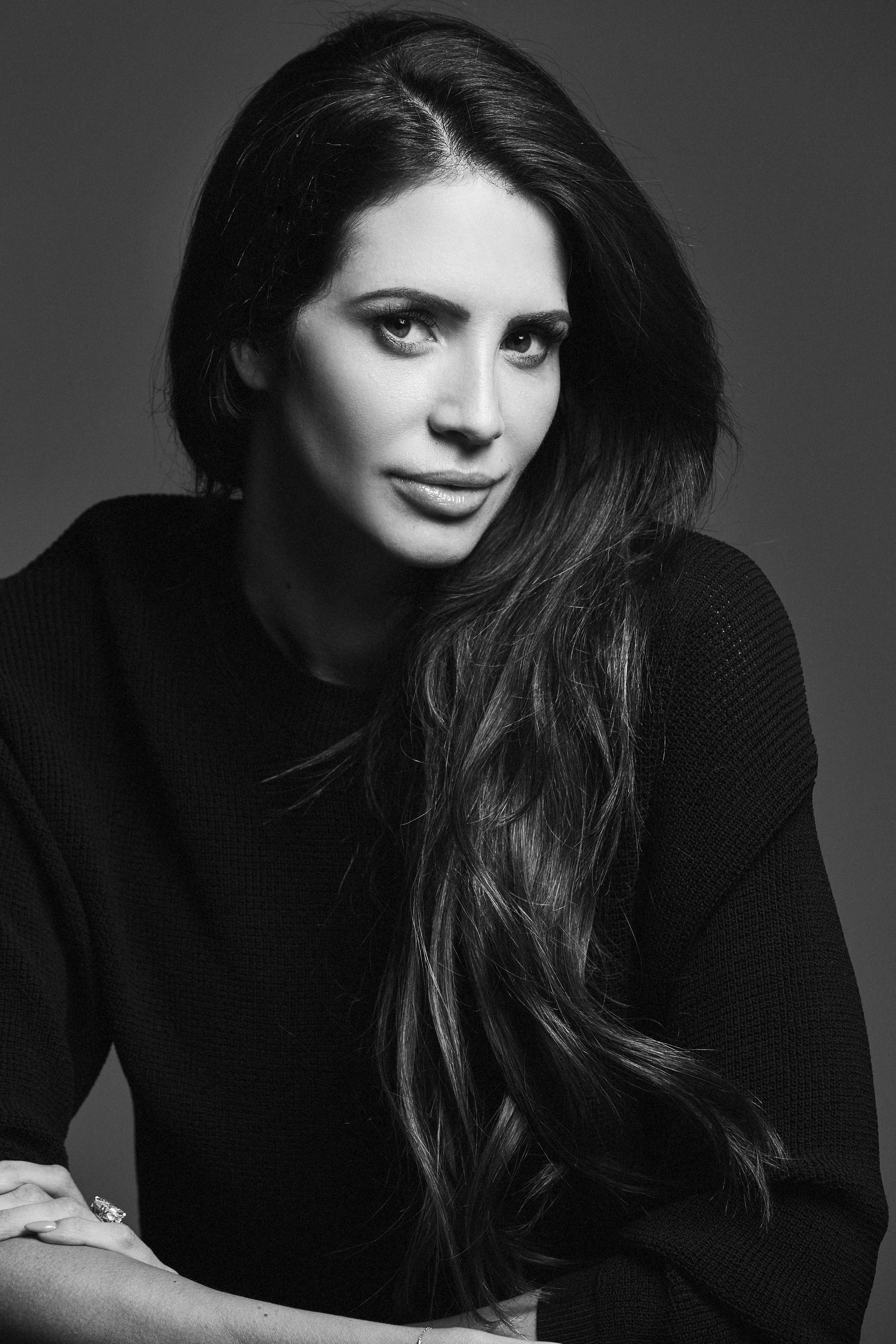
- Photo of smith

Playboy centerfold appearance
- April 2009
- Preceded by: Jennifer Pershing
- Succeeded by: Crystal McCahill

Playboy Playmate of the Year
- 2010
- Preceded by: Ida Ljungqvist
- Succeeded by: Claire Sinclair

Personal details
- Born: November 21, 1984 (age 41) Port Lavaca, Texas, U.S.
- Height: 5 ft 10 in (1.78 m)

Hope Dworaczyk Smith (/dəˈrɑːsɪk/ dvo-RAH-chick; born November 21, 1984) is an American entrepreneur, model, and reality television personality. She is the founder and CEO of MUTHA, a skincare company, and was the host of Inside Fashion. Smith was Playboy magazine's Playmate of the Month for April 2009, and later became the 2010 Playmate of the Year.

== Career ==
=== Modeling ===
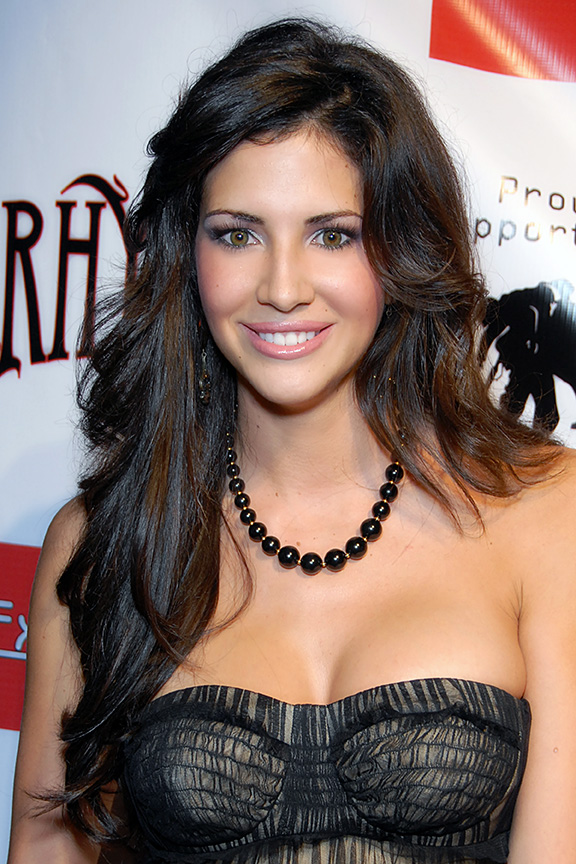
Dworaczyk in 2009

She began her modeling career after competing in the Miss Texas Teen USA competition when she was 16 years old. From there, she was signed to Wilhelmina Models, which represented her for runway shows including Balenciaga.

Smith appeared on the cover of the April 2009 issue of Playboy magazine together with Seth Rogen. Her centerfold pictorial was photographed by Stephen Wayda. She was later selected as the 2010 Playmate of the Year. Her PMOY pictorial was in the June 2010 issue of the magazine, which included a 3-D fold-out image of her.

She has also worked as a runway model, toured for labels such as Versace, and hosted and co-produced Inside Fashion in Canada on the E! channel.

Her runway work includes such names as Balenciaga, Robert Rodriguez, Lana Fuchs, Leila Rose, Abaete, Joanna Mastroianni, Rosa Cha, XOXO, and Miss Sixty. Other career highlights include a world tour for Versace with visits to Tokyo, Milan, London, and New York City, and print campaigns for brands such as Patek Philippe and Elie Saab, among others.

=== Television ===
Smith was a contestant in the spring 2011 edition of Celebrity Apprentice. She won the task as project manager in week 7, and won $40,000 for her charity, Best Buddies International.

Of her appearance in the show, she stated: "I went on the show with one goal. Not to leave until I won money for Best Buddies. I chose to play for them because it’s a great cause."

In 2012, she participated in Fox's dating game show The Choice.

=== Business ventures ===
Smith opened her first business, Oasis Med Spa, in Houston, Texas, in 2005. She received an aesthetician license prior to opening the medical spa, which she sold for an undisclosed amount in 2007.

Smith is the founder and CEO of MUTHA, a skincare company. The brand is projected to net US$3 million in 2021. As of 2020, MUTHA donated 5% of sales to maternal care programs in regions with high maternal mortality rates.

Smith published a book titled Your Body is Magic in March 2022. The book discusses her pregnancy and birth experiences and offers advice to pregnant and post partum women.

== Personal life ==
Smith was born and raised in Port Lavaca, Texas. She graduated from high school at 16. She is of Polish descent through her father, and Mexican through her mother.

Smith has worked with several charities, including International Medical Corps, Together We Rise, and Unlikely Heroes.

On July 25, 2015, Smith married billionaire Robert F. Smith, the founder of Vista Equity Partners. Smith and her husband have four children together. Smith gave birth to the couple's first child, a son named Hendrix Robert Smith, on December 19, 2014. Smith gave birth to their second child, a son named Legend Robert Smith, on March 16, 2016. In 2020, the Smiths welcomed twin daughters Zuri and Zya, who were born via surrogate.

Dasha Astafieva	Jessica Burciaga	Jennifer Pershing	Hope Dworaczyk	Crystal McCahill	Candice Cassidy
Karissa Shannon	Kristina Shannon	Kimberly Phillips	Lindsey Gayle Evans	Kelley Thompson	Crystal Harris
