= Black billionaires =

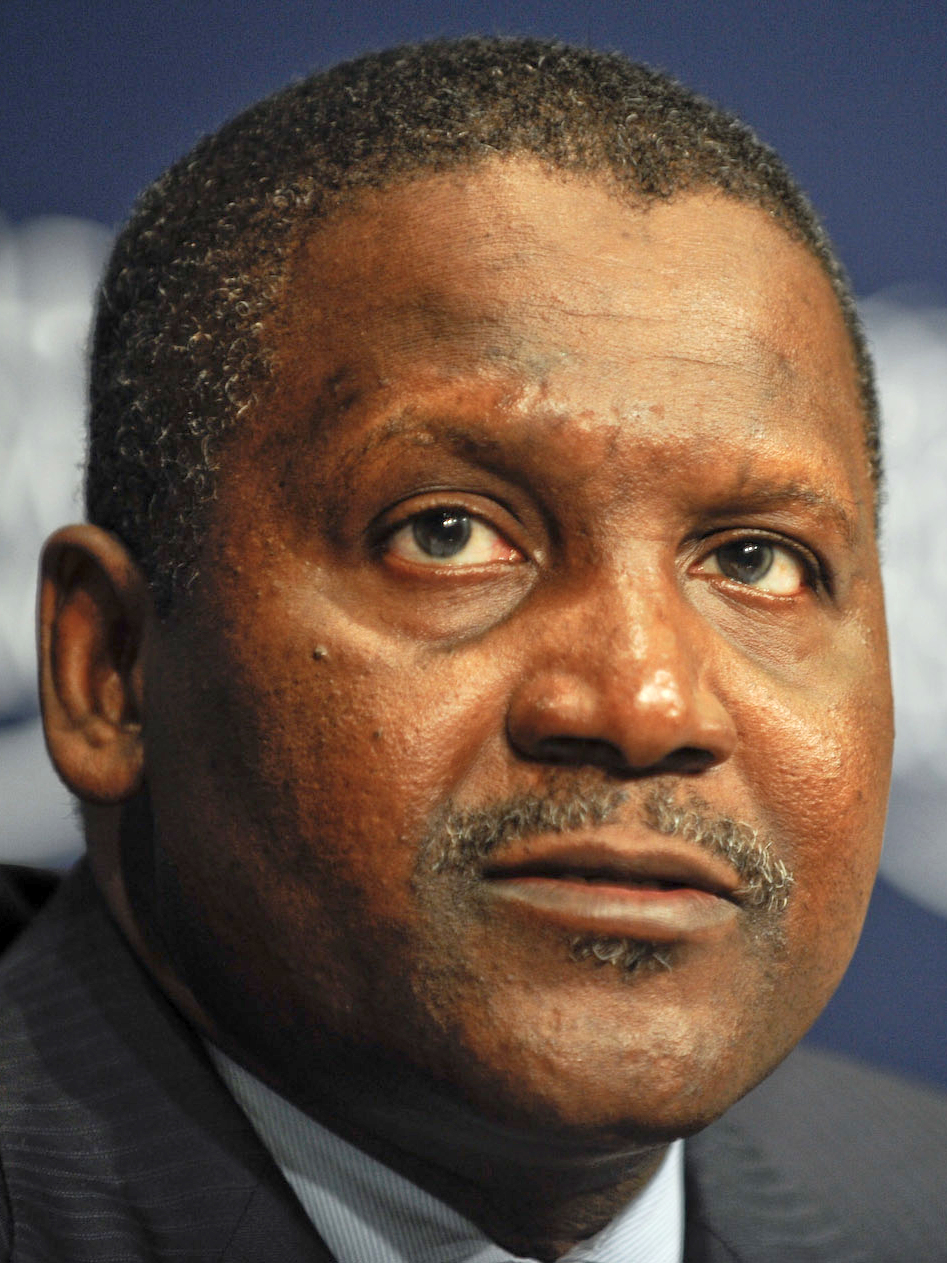
The richest black person, Aliko Dangote, at the World Economic Forum, 2011

Black billionaires are individuals who are of predominantly black African ancestry with a net worth of at least US$1 billion.

Nigerian business magnate Aliko Dangote had a net worth of US$30.3 billion and was the world's richest black man, according to the 2025 ranking of the world's billionaires by Forbes Real Time Billionaires and Bloomberg Billionaires Index.

Other billionaires of African descent on the 2025 Forbes list included Nigerian businessman Mike Adenuga with $7.1 billion, American investor Robert Smith with $12.0 billion, American businessman David Steward with $12.8 billion, American media mogul Oprah Winfrey with $3.7 billion, South African gold magnate Patrice Motsepe with $4.3 billion, Zimbabwe Strive Masiyiwa with $2.2 billion, Barbadian music artist/entrepreneur Rihanna with $1.9 billion, American rapper Jay-Z with $2.5 billion, American rapper Kanye West with $2.7 billion, sports executive Michael Jordan with $3.5 billion, Jamaican-Canadian businessman Michael Lee-Chin with $1.6 billion, Nigerian businessman Abdul Samad Rabiu with US$14.6 billion, Nigerian businesswoman Folorunsho Alakija with $1.1 billion, Mo Ibrahim of the United Kingdom with $1.3 billion, American athlete Tiger Woods with $1 billion, American media mogul Tyler Perry with $1 billion, and American professional basketball player LeBron James with $1.2 billion.

From 2001 to 2003, Forbes listed American television network executive Bob Johnson as a billionaire, but dropped him after his fortune was split in his divorce. He returned to the Forbes Billionaire list in 2007 with a net worth of $1.1 billion. In 2008 Johnson's wealth dropped again, this time to approximately $1.0 billion, and by 2009 he fell off the list again. Nigerian petroleum executive Femi Otedola briefly emerged as a billionaire in 2009 but did not remain one in subsequent years. He returned to the list in the company of a fellow Nigerian, sugar tycoon Abdul Samad Rabiu, in 2016, but both were dropped from the rankings the following year. Otedola re-emerged as a billionaire in 2024. Haitian medical entrepreneur Herriot Tabuteau joined the list in 2025 with an estimated net worth of US$1.1 billion.

Multiracial billionaires with significant African ancestry have been identified over the years. Saudi Arabian billionaire Mohammed Al Amoudi, of Hadhrami Yemeni and Amhara Ethiopian descent, has been on the Forbes billionaire list since 2002 and in 2025 had a net worth of $10.3 billion. Michael Lee-Chin of Canada, who is Jamaican of Chinese and Black ancestry, was on the list from 2001 to 2010 but dropped off in 2011. Isabel dos Santos is of both Angolan and Russian ancestry is worth US$4.0 billion in 2018. The net worth of Alex Karp exceeded US$18.6 billion in 2025. He is cofounder and CEO of Palantir Technologies, and has a Black mother. Rihanna is of both Guyanese and Irish descent.

Of all the above-mentioned billionaires identified by Forbes, only Oprah Winfrey qualified for Forbes 2009's list of the world's 20 most powerful billionaires, a list which considered not only wealth, but also market sway and political clout. Winfrey was considered especially powerful because of her influence on American consumer choices and her pivotal role in Barack Obama's successful 2008 U.S. presidential campaign.

== List of Black billionaires ==
(Wealth valuations by Forbes & Bloomberg Billionaires Index )

Year	Black billionaires	Bi/Multiracial billionaires with Black ancestry	All billionaires
2001	1: Bob Johnson, $1.6 billion (United States)	1: Michael Lee-Chin, $1 billion (Jamaica) (Canada)	538; Richest: Bill Gates, $114 billion (United States)
2002	1: Bob Johnson, $1 billion (United States)	2: Mohammad Al Amoudi, $1.5 billion (Ethiopia) (Saudi Arabia); Michael Lee-Chin, $1.1 billion (Jamaica) (Canada)	497; Richest: Bill Gates, $52.8 billion (United States)
2003	2: Bob Johnson, $1.2 billion (United States); Oprah Winfrey, $1 billion (United States)	2: Mohammad Al Amoudi, $1.5 billion (Ethiopia) (Saudi Arabia); Michael Lee-Chin, $1.4 billion (Jamaica) (Canada)	476; Richest: Bill Gates, $40.7 billion (United States)
2004	1: Oprah Winfrey, $1.1 billion (United States)	2: Michael Lee-Chin, $2.4 billion (Jamaica) (Canada); Mohammad Al Amoudi, $1.4 billion (Ethiopia) (Saudi Arabia)	587; Richest: Bill Gates, $46.6 billion (United States)
2005	1: Oprah Winfrey, $1.3 billion (United States)	2: Michael Lee-Chin, $2.5 billion (Jamaica) (Canada); Mohammad Al Amoud, $2.5 billion (Ethiopia) (Saudi Arabia)	691; Richest: Bill Gates, $46.5 billion (United States)
2006	1: Oprah Winfrey, $1.4 billion (United States)	2: Mohammad Al Amoudi, $6.9 billion (Ethiopia) (Saudi Arabia); Michael Lee-Chin, $2.1 billion (Jamaica) (Canada)	793; Richest: Bill Gates, $50 billion (United States)
2007	2: Oprah Winfrey, $1.5 billion (United States); Bob Johnson, $1.1 billion (United States)	2: Mohammad Al Amoudi, $8 billion (Ethiopia) (Saudi Arabia); Michael Lee-Chin, $1.6 billion (Canada) (Jamaica)	946; Richest: Bill Gates, $56 billion (United States)
2008	5: Aliko Dangote, $3.3 billion (Nigeria); Oprah Winfrey, $2.5 billion (United States); Mo Ibrahim, $2.5 billion (Sudan) (United Kingdom); Patrice Motsepe, $2.4 billion (South Africa); Bob Johnson, $1 billion (United States)	2: Mohammad Al Amoudi, $9 billion (Ethiopia) (Saudi Arabia); Michael Lee-Chin, $1.8 billion (Jamaica) (Canada)	1,125; Richest: Warren Buffett, $62 billion (United States)
2009	5: Oprah Winfrey, $2.7 billion (United States); Aliko Dangote, $2.5 billion (Nigeria); Mo Ibrahim, $2 billion (Sudan) (United Kingdom); Femi Otedola, $1.6 billion (Nigeria); Patrice Motsepe, $1.3 billion (South Africa)	2: Mohammad Al Amoudi, $9 billion (Ethiopia) (Saudi Arabia); Michael Lee-Chin, $1 billion (Jamaica) (Canada)	793; Richest: Bill Gates, $40 billion (United States)
2010	3: Oprah Winfrey, $2.4 billion (United States); Patrice Motsepe, $2.3 billion (South Africa); Mo Ibrahim, $2 billion (Sudan) (United Kingdom)	2: Mohammad Al Amoudi, $10 billion (Ethiopia) (Saudi Arabia); Michael Lee-Chin, $1 billion (Jamaica) (Canada)	1,011; Richest: Carlos Slim Helu & family, $53.5 billion (Mexico)
2011	5: Aliko Dangote, $13.8 billion (Nigeria); Patrice Motsepe, $3.3 billion (South Africa); Oprah Winfrey, $2.7 billion (United States); Mike Adenuga, $2 billion (Nigeria); Mo Ibrahim, $1.8 billion (Sudan) (United Kingdom)	1: Mohammad Al Amoudi, $12.3 billion (Ethiopia) (Saudi Arabia)	1,210; Richest: Carlos Slim Helu & family, $74 billion (Mexico)
2012	5: Aliko Dangote, $11.2 billion (Nigeria); Mike Adenuga, $4.3 billion (Nigeria); Patrice Motsepe, $2.7 billion (South Africa); Oprah Winfrey, $2.7 billion (United States); Mo Ibrahim, $1.1 billion (Sudan) (United Kingdom)	1: Mohammad Al Amoudi, $12.3 billion (Ethiopia) (Saudi Arabia)	1,210; Richest: Carlos Slim Helu & family, $74 billion (Mexico)
2013	5: Aliko Dangote, $16.1 billion (Nigeria); Mike Adenuga, $4.7 billion (Nigeria); Patrice Motsepe, $2.9 billion (South Africa); Oprah Winfrey, $2.8 billion (United States); Mo Ibrahim, $1.1 billion (Sudan) (United Kingdom)	2: Mohammad Al Amoudi, $13.5 billion (Ethiopia) (Saudi Arabia); Isabel dos Santos, $2 billion (Azerbaijan) (Angola)	1,426; Richest: Carlos Slim Helu & family, $73 billion (Mexico)
2014	7: Aliko Dangote, $25 billion (Nigeria); Mike Adenuga, $4.6 billion (Nigeria); Oprah Winfrey, $2.9 billion (United States); Patrice Motsepe, $2.9 billion (South Africa); Florunsho Alakija, $2.5 billion (Nigeria); Abdul Samad Rabiu, $1.2 billion (Nigeria); Mo Ibrahim, $1.1 billion (Sudan) (United Kingdom)	2: Mohammad Al Amoudi, $15.3 billion (Ethiopia) (Saudi Arabia); Isabel Dos Santos, $3.7 billion (Angola)	1,645; Richest: Bill Gates, $76 billion (United States)
2016	11: Aliko Dangote, $15.4 billion (Nigeria); Mike Adenuga, $10 billion (Nigeria); Robert Smith, $4.4 billion (United States); Oprah Winfrey, $3.1 billion (United States); Femi Otedola, $1.85 billion (Nigeria); Strive Masiyiwa, $1.8 billion (Zimbabwe); Folorunsho Alakija, $1.55 billion (Nigeria); Patrice Motsepe, $1.15 billion (South Africa); Michael Jordan, $1.14 billion (United States); Abdul Samad Rabiu, $1.1 billion (Nigeria); Mo Ibrahim, $1.07 billion (Sudan) (United Kingdom)	2: Mohammed Al-Amoudi, $8.3 billion (Ethiopia) (Saudi Arabia); Isabel Dos Santos, $3.1 billion (Angola)	1,810; Richest: Bill Gates, $75 billion (United States)
2019	12: Aliko Dangote, $10.4 billion (Nigeria); Mike Adenuga, $9.2 billion (Nigeria); Robert Smith, $5 billion (United States); David Steward, $3.9 billion (United States); Oprah Winfrey, $2.7 billion (United States); Strive Masiyiwa, $2.4 billion (Zimbabwe); Patrice Motsepe, $2.3 billion (South Africa); Michael Jordan, $1.9 billion (United States); Abdul Samad Rabiu, $1.6 billion (Nigeria); Folorunsho Alakija, $1.1 billion (Nigeria); Mo Ibrahim, $1.1 billion (Sudan) (United Kingdom); Jay-Z, $1 billion (United States)	4: Mohammad Al-Amoudi, $8.6 billion (Ethiopia) (Saudi Arabia); Isabel Dos Santos, $2.3 billion (Angola); Michael Lee-Chin, $1.9 billion (Jamaica) (Canada); Alex Karp, $1.3 billion (United States)	2,153; Richest: Jeff Bezos, $110 billion (United States)
2020	14: Aliko Dangote, $8.3 billion (Nigeria); Mike Adenuga, $5.6 billion (Nigeria); Robert Smith, $5 billion (United States); David Steward, $4 billion (United States); Abdul Samad Rabiu, $3.2 billion (Nigeria); Oprah Winfrey, $2.7 billion (United States); Strive Masiyiwa, $2.4 billion (Zimbabwe) (United Kingdom); Patrice Motsepe, $2.3 billion (South Africa); Michael Jordan, $2.1 billion (United States); Kanye West, $1.2 billion (United States); Folorunsho Alakija, $1.1 billion (Nigeria); Mo Ibrahim, $1.1 billion (Sudan) (United Kingdom); Jay-Z, $1 billion (United States); Tyler Perry, $1 billion (United States)	4: Mohammad Al-Amoudi, $7.6 billion (Ethiopia) (Saudi Arabia); Alex Karp, $3 billion (United States); Isabel Dos Santos, $2.3 billion (Angola); Michael Lee-Chin, $1.9 billion (Jamaica) (Canada)	2,095; Richest: Jeff Bezos, $113 billion (United States)
2021–2022	17: Aliko Dangote, $11.5 billion (Nigeria); Mike Adenuga, $6.1 billion (Nigeria); Robert Smith, $5 billion (United States); David Steward, $4 billion (United States); Abdul Samad Rabiu, $3.2 billion (Nigeria); Oprah Winfrey, $2.7 billion (United States); Strive Masiyiwa, $2.4 billion (Zimbabwe) (United Kingdom); Patrice Motsepe, $2.3 billion (South Africa); Kanye West, $2 billion (United States); Michael Jordan, $1.6 billion (United States); Tope Awotona, $1.4 billion (Nigeria) (United States); Jay-Z, $1.4 billion (United States); Mo Ibrahim, $1.2 billion (Sudan) (United Kingdom); Tyler Perry, $1 billion (United States); LeBron James, $1 billion (United States); Sean Combs, $1 billion (United States); Magic Johnson, $1 billion (United States)	6: Mohammad Al-Amoudi, $5.45 billion (Ethiopia) (Saudi Arabia); Alex Karp, $1.1 billion (United States); Michael Lee-Chin, $1.9 billion (Jamaica) (Canada); Rihanna, $1.7 billion (Barbados); Isabel Dos Santos, $1.4 billion (Russia) (Angola); Tiger Woods, $1.0 billion (United States)	
2023	15: Aliko Dangote, $14.2 billion (Nigeria); Abdul Samad Rabiu, $8.2 billion (Nigeria); Robert Smith, $8 billion (United States); Mike Adenuga, $6.1 billion (Nigeria); David Steward, $6 billion (United States); Patrice Motsepe, $2.7 billion (South Africa); Oprah Winfrey, $2.5 billion (United States); Michael Jordan, $2 billion (United States); Strive Masiyiwa, $1.9 billion (Zimbabwe) (United Kingdom); Jay-Z, $2.5 billion (United States); Magic Johnson, $1.2 billion (United States); Mo Ibrahim, $1.2 billion (Sudan) (United Kingdom); Tope Awotona, $1.2 billion (Nigeria) (United States); Tyler Perry, $1 billion (United States); LeBron James, $1 billion (United States)	5: Mohammad Al-Amoudi, $9.05 billion (Ethiopia) (Saudi Arabia); Michael Lee-Chin, $1.4 billion (Jamaica) (Canada); Rihanna, $1.4 billion (Barbados); Alex Karp, $1.3 billion (United States); Tiger Woods, $1.1 billion (United States)	2,540; Richest: Bernard Arnault & family, $211 billion (France)
2024	17: Aliko Dangote, $13.9 billion (Nigeria); Robert Smith, $12.0 billion (United States); David Steward, $12.8 billion (United States); Mike Adenuga, $6.9 billion (Nigeria); Abdul Samad Rabiu, $5.9 billion (Nigeria); Michael Jordan, $3.4 billion (United States); Oprah Winfrey, $3.3 billion (United States); Patrice Motsepe, $3.2 billion (South Africa); Jay-Z, $2.8 billion (United States); Strive Masiyiwa, $3.1 billion (Zimbabwe) (United Kingdom); Adebayo Ogunlesi $1.7 billion (Nigeria) (United States); Femi Otedola, $1.5 billion (Nigeria); Tope Awotona, $1.4 billion (Nigeria) (United States); Tyler Perry, $1.4 billion (United States); Mo Ibrahim, $1.3 billion (Sudan) (United Kingdom); LeBron James, $1.2 billion (United States); Magic Johnson, $1.2 billion (United States)	6: Mohammad Al-Amoudi, $9.43 billion (Ethiopia) (Saudi Arabia); Alex Karp, $7.9 billion (United States); Michael Lee-Chin, $1.4 billion (Jamaica) (Canada); Rihanna, $1.4 billion (Barbados); Tiger Woods, $1.3 billion (United States); Sheila Johnson, $1 billion (United States)	2,781; Richest: Bernard Arnault & family, $233 billion (France)
2025	20: Aliko Dangote, $30.3 billion (Nigeria); David Steward, $12.4 billion (United States); Robert Smith, $11.1 billion (United States); Mike Adenuga, $6.9 billion (Nigeria); Abdul Samad Rabiu, $8.9 billion (Nigeria); Michael Jordan, $3.8 billion (United States); Patrice Motsepe, $3.4 billion (South Africa); Oprah Winfrey, $3.2 billion (United States); Jay-Z, $2.5 billion (United States); Adebayo Ogunlesi $2.5 billion (Nigeria) (United States); Magic Johnson, $1.5 billion (United States); Femi Otedola, $1.6 billion (Nigeria); Tope Awotona, $1.4 billion (Nigeria) (United States); Tyler Perry, $1.4 billion (United States); Mo Ibrahim, $1.3 billion (Sudan) (United Kingdom); LeBron James, $1.3 billion (United States); Strive Masiyiwa, $1.3 billion (Zimbabwe) (United Kingdom); Herriot Tabuteau, $1.1 billion (Haiti) (United States); Bob Johnson, $1 billion (United States); Byron Allen, $1 billion (United States); Dr. Dre, $1 billion (United States)	7: Alex Karp, $18.6 billion (United States); Mohammad Al-Amoudi, $10.3 billion (Ethiopia) (Saudi Arabia); Tiger Woods, $1.4 billion (United States); Rihanna, $1.4 billion (Barbados); Michael Lee-Chin, $1.1 billion (Jamaica) (Canada); Sheila Johnson, $1 billion (United States); Beyoncé, $1 billion (United States)	3,028; Richest: Elon Musk, US$1.1 trillion (South Africa) (Canada) (United States)
