= List of Haitians by net worth =

As of 2025, there are xx billionaires in Haiti descent, according to Forbes.

== 2025 Haitian billionaires list ==
Global ranking	Name	Citizenship	Net worth (USD)	Sources of wealth
#2790	Herriot Tabuteau	United States	1.1 Billion	Axsome Therapeutics
xxx	Gilbert Bigio	Haiti	1 Billion	GB Group

== See also ==
- Lists of billionaires
- List of countries by the number of billionaires
- Lists of people by nationality
- List of Haitian people
