= Baltimore Presstman Cardinals =

Information
- League: Baltimore
- Location: Baltimore, Maryland
- Founded: 1962
- Management: Jason Booker (Team info.)
- President: Reggie Smith
- General manager: Ray Hale
- Manager: Reggie Smith

The Baltimore Presstman Cardinals is an independent developmental baseball organization based in Baltimore City. The P.C. will once again field teams 10u, 12u, 14u, 16u, 18u, and collegiate level. The teams will compete local, regional, national and international. The Cardinals is owned and operated by the non-profit, The Presstman Cardinals Baseball Club, Inc. is funded through donations, sponsorship, and fundraising. pcard3307.wixsite.com/theforce

== History ==
In 1962, Robert E. Smith, created the Cardinals as a youth baseball team. The Presstman Cardinals were borne of a local flavor that is inherent it in its name: “Presstman” for the street he lived on and “Cardinals” in recalling the birds that perched on his car to rest. And so began the establishment of the local baseball club that provided opportunities for prospective baseball players who would not necessarily otherwise have a chance. Within a few years, the Presstman Cardinals began winning and garnering local attention. By 1981 the team rose to local prominence by fielding teams in all age groups, 10–12, 13–14, 15–16,17-18 and a collegiate level team. The Presstman Cardinals soared and expanded during the 1980s into the 1990s. Using each age group as feeder for the next age level, Presstman Cardinals became one of the most successful organizations in the State of Maryland. During that period, many of the ballplayers elevated to the college level, which led to the creation of the successful college team that participated in the Metro area Baltimore Major League, winning three championships in their eight years in the league. The Presstman Cardinals also played in the Central Atlantic and Washington Industrial League. Many of the players were either drafted or signed as free agents in professional baseball. The Presstman Cardinals also produced the NCAA stolen base champion Jason Booker in 1986; batting crown champion Adrian Price in 1994; and several college, minor and independent coaches throughout its history.
