= RLJ Companies =

American asset management firm

The RLJ Companies
- Type: Private
- Industry: Various
- Founded: 2002; 24 years ago
- Headquarters: Bethesda, Maryland
- Key people: Robert L. Johnson
- Products: Investment Holdings
- AUM: $5 billion
- Website: www.rljcompanies.com

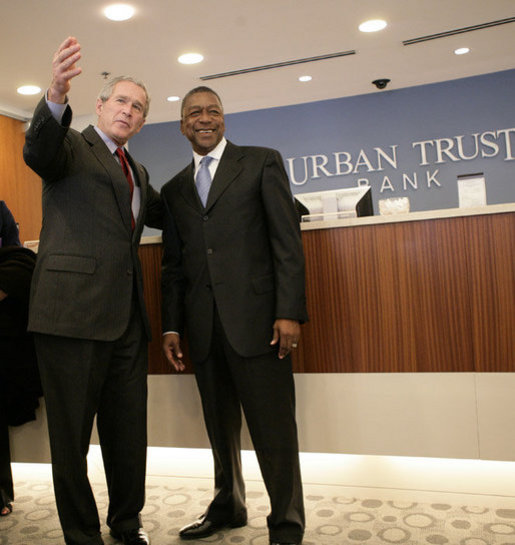
President George W. Bush is welcomed by Robert Johnson, founder and chairman of the RLJ Companies, to the Urban Trust Bank for a discussion on the economy with small business owners and community bankers, Oct. 23, 2006 in Washington, D.C.

The RLJ Companies is an American asset management firm owned by entrepreneur Robert Louis Johnson. After selling Black Entertainment Television in 2001, Johnson's first company, he created RLJ Companies in Bethesda, Maryland. The company's network includes hotel real estate investment, private equity, financial services, asset management, insurance services, car dealerships, sports and entertainment, and video lottery terminal (VLT) gaming. The company is headquartered in Bethesda and has additional offices in Charlotte, North Carolina; Little Rock, Arkansas; Los Angeles, California; San Juan, Puerto Rico, and Monrovia, Liberia.

== History ==
Robert L. Johnson founded The RLJ Companies in 2002 in Bethesda, Maryland. Johnson is chairman of the company. Previous to founding The RLJ Companies, Johnson owned BET, which he sold to Viacom in 2001. He remained on at BET as its CEO through 2006.

In 2001, Johnson and Tom Baltimore started RLJ Lodging Trust with six hotels. RLJ Lodging Trust started as RLJ Development and changed its name when it went public on the New York Stock Exchange under RLJ on May 13, 2011. The company operates in 21 states with 97 hotels under global brands including Courtyard by Marriott, Hilton Garden Inn, Hyatt Place and Embassy Suites Hotels. In 2008, RLJ Companies formed a partnership with Global Building Solutions to build a 78-room luxury resort and spa in Monrovia, Liberia. The RLJ Kendeja Resort & Villas opened in March 2009. Thomas J. Baltimore Jr. was president and CEO of RLJ Lodging Trust until his resignation on April 27, 2016, so that he could assume a similar role with Hilton's REIT. Ross H. Bierkan was appointed CEO on August 1, 2016. Leslie D. Hale was then appointed CEO of RLJ Lodging Trust, and has remained in the position since 2018.

David Rubenstein and Johnson partnered with Carlyle Group in 2006 to form RLJ Equity Partners, a middle-market equity firm. RLJ Equity Partners invested in CVC, the largest tour operator in Latin America, in January 2010. In September 2010, it partnered with Enhanced Recovery Corp to gain more presence in the Southeast. It has also invested in Fleischmann's Vinegar, LAI International, TMone, Naylor and R. Thompson Trucking Inc.

In 2014, RLJ Equity Partners acquired Naylor Association Solutions, with its headquarters in Gainesville, Florida.

Johnson collaborated with Mack McLarty and Steve Landers to create RLJ-McLarty-Landers Automotive Holdings, LLC in 2007. It is the parent company for Little Rock, Arkansas based RML Automotive. Johnson holds 60% of RLJ-McLarty-Landers Automotive Holdings, LLC, making it the largest minority-owned automotive dealership in the country.

In response to the 2010 Haiti earthquake, Global Building Solutions collaborated with RLJ Companies to form Caribbean Opportunity Holdings in April 2010.

Trading under NASDAQ as RLJAU, RLJ Acquisition was formed as a special-purpose acquisition company in December 2010 with the purpose of consummating business combinations. H. Van Sinclair is CEO.

RLJ Entertainment Inc. formed when the RLJ Companies acquired Acorn Media Group, Inc. and Image Entertainment Inc. in 2012. It traded under the NASDAQ ticker RLJE. In 2018 it went private after being acquired by AMC Networks.
