= Nexthink =

Swiss software company

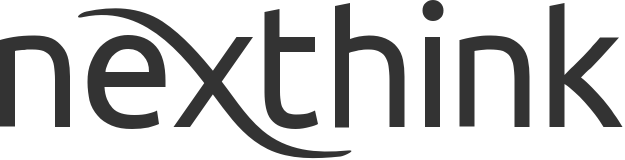
- Type: Private
- Industry: Software, IT services
- Founded: 2004
- Founders: Pedro Bados, Patrick Hertzog, Vincent Bieri
- Headquarters: Prilly, Lausanne, Switzerland
- Area served: Worldwide
- Key people: Pedro Bados (CEO)
- Products: Digital Employee Experience Management Software
- Revenue: $294.9 million (2024)
- Owner: Vista Equity Partners (majority, since March 2026)
- Number of employees: 1,200 (2026)
- Website: www.nexthink.com

Nexthink is a Swiss software company specializing in digital employee experience (DEX) management. Founded in 2004, the company provides IT teams with real-time analytics, automation, and employee feedback tools to monitor and enhance the digital workplace experience. As of October 2025, the software was used by about 1,500 enterprise customers with a combined 25 million employees, according to investor Index Ventures.

Nexthink is dual-headquartered in Prilly, Lausanne, Switzerland and Boston, USA. It also operates a further 10 offices worldwide, including London, Paris, Frankfurt, Madrid, Dubai, Riyadh, and Bangalore.

== History ==
Nexthink was founded by Pedro Bados, Patrick Hertzog, and Vincent Bieri in Prilly in 2004. The company originated from research in artificial intelligence at the École Polytechnique Fédérale de Lausanne (EPFL).

In April 2016, Nexthink raised $40 million in a funding round led by Highland Europe, with participation from Waypoint Capital, Auriga Partners, and Galeo Ventures.

In December 2018, Nexthink raised $85 million in a funding round led by Index Ventures, with participation from existing investors and TOP Funds and Olivier Pomel, co-founder and CEO of Datadog.

In December 2020, Nexthink surpassed $100 million in annual recurring revenue (ARR). In February 2021, Nexthink secured $180 million in a Series D funding round, with a valuation of $1.1 billion. The investment was led by Permira, with participation from existing investors such as Highland Europe and Index Ventures.

In early 2024, Nexthink acquired AppLearn, a UK-based provider of digital adoption services.

In February 2025, Nexthink won G2.com's 2025 "Best EMEA Software Award". Gartner has placed Nexthink in the Leaders quadrant of its Magic Quadrant for Digital Employee Experience Management Tools in every edition since the first in 2024, most recently in June 2026.

An agreement announced in October 2025 gave Vista Equity Partners a majority stake in Nexthink, bought from existing shareholders including Permira, at a valuation of about $3 billion; Bados stayed on as chief executive. The purchase closed in March 2026 and was financed in part by $750 million of private credit, split between a $650 million term loan and a $100 million revolving credit facility, with Blue Owl Capital providing the largest share. Vista reported that recurring revenue from Nexthink's AI products had risen from $20 million in the first quarter of 2025 to $109 million a year later.

== Products ==
Nexthink provides a cloud-based software platform focused on the digital employee experience (DEX). Its real-time analytics monitor aspects like device performance, application usage, network connectivity, and security status from the end-user's device. The software identifies specific IT problems and applies automated solutions through its automation and remediation capabilities. It also enables IT teams to collect user input using surveys and notifications for employee feedback. The platform gives IT departments data across the IT environment, providing visibility into physical, virtual, and cloud systems.

For measurement, the company calculates metrics related to the digital employee experience. This platform can integrate with other IT service management (ITSM) and security software. Organizations use it for various tasks, including IT support, resource management, service desk operations, managing technology changes, and monitoring IT sustainability indicators.

In January 2026, the company released Spark, an AI agent built on its Infinity platform that diagnoses and resolves employees' IT problems automatically.
