= Robert Brockman =

American billionaire (1941–2022)

- Born: Robert Theron Brockman; May 28, 1941; St. Petersburg, Florida, U.S.
- Died: August 5, 2022 (aged 81)
- Education: Centre College; University of Florida
- Occupation: Businessman
- Spouse: Dorothy Kay Brockman (m. 1968)

Robert Theron Brockman (May 28, 1941 – August 5, 2022) was an American billionaire businessman and once CEO of Ohio-based Reynolds & Reynolds software company.

== Early life and education ==
Brockman was born in St. Petersburg, Florida. His father Alfred Eugene Brockman was a gas-station owner, and his mother, Pearl, was a physiotherapist. Thomas David Brockman was his brother.

Brockman briefly attended Centre College in Danville, Kentucky. He later graduated summa cum laude from the University of Florida in 1963, and was a member of its business honor society.

== Career ==
Brockman started his career in 1964 as a marketing trainee with Ford Motors, and was a Marine Corps reservist at the same time. From 1966 to 1970, he worked at IBM and was the leading U.S. salesman in IBM's service bureau.

Brockman founded Universal Computer Systems, a computer systems and software provider for car dealerships, in 1970 in his living room. The company sold its first in-dealership computer system in 1982. In the late 1980s, Brockman introduced what remains one of his core software operating systems, called Power.

The company merged with Reynolds & Reynolds on August 8, 2006. He became the CEO after the merger.

== Tax fraud charges ==
On September 5, 2018, IRS agents and Bermudan police executed a search warrant for a raid in Bermuda on the home office of Evatt Tamine ("Tamine"), a lawyer who worked closely with Brockman for 14 years and who, according to the Government, helped Brockman illegally conceal assets offshore.

A 39-count indictment was filed against Brockman in September 2020 in the Northern District of California. Brockman was accused of engaging in a 20-year long scheme to hide around $2 billion in income from the IRS. His charges included tax evasion, wire fraud, money laundering, and failure to disclose assets held overseas. Brockman pleaded not guilty, and was released on a $1 million bond. In October 2021, Brockman was among those listed in the Pandora Papers revelations, which exposed offshore tax shelters of the financial assets of hundreds of politicians, business people, and celebrities.

Brockman was later placed under an IRS assessment targeting taxpayers who may flee. In March 2022, he offered to put up $1.45 billion to relax IRS liens on his property and assets. In May 2022, he was ruled mentally competent to stand trial by Judge George C. Hanks Jr. of the United States District Court for the Southern District of Texas.

Brockman was an investor in Vista Equity Partners. Its founder Robert F. Smith reached a non-prosecution agreement with the United States Department of Justice, agreeing in October 2020 to assist the DOJ in a case against Brockman who was charged that month with what the DOJ called the "largest ever" tax fraud scheme by a U.S. citizen, and to pay a fine of $139 million.

In December 2025, Brockman's heirs settled with the IRS, paying $750 Million which includes $456 million in back taxes and $294 million in penalties, in the largest tax fraud case involving an individual.

== Personal life ==
Brockman married at age 18 in Kentucky, and later divorced. He married Dorothy Kay Brockman in 1968; the couple lived in Houston. He was a very private individual and refused public interviews.

He was a prolific donor to Republican groups and causes.

On August 6, 2022, Brockman's attorney Kathy Keneally confirmed that he had died the previous day. He was 81 years old. Before his death, Brockman had been diagnosed with dementia.

=== Philanthropy and board memberships ===
In July 2013, Centre College in Danville, Kentucky announced that it had received a $250 million donation from Brockman's charitable trust. This donation was later withdrawn, when a "significant capital market event", upon which the gift was contingent, did not occur.

Brockman donated money to, and has two named buildings on the campus of, Rice University in Houston. He was also on the Council of Overseers of the Jesse H. Jones Graduate School of Business.

He served on the board of trustees of Centre College and Baylor College of Medicine.
