= Reynolds and Reynolds =

Private corporation based in Ohio

The Reynolds and Reynolds Company
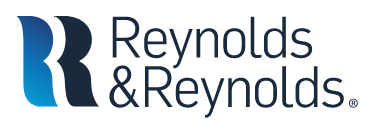
- Formerly: Reynolds and Gardner (1866–1867)
- Type: Private
- Founded: March 1866; 160 years ago
- Founders: Lucius Reynolds; James Gardner
- Headquarters: 1 Reynolds Way, Dayton, Ohio, U.S.
- Area served: Worldwide
- Key people: Chris Walsh (CEO)
- Products: Automotive retailer forms, software and services
- Number of employees: 4,600 (5000+)
- Website: Official website

The Reynolds and Reynolds Company is a private corporation based in Dayton, Ohio, United States. Its primary business is providing business forms, management software and professional services to car dealerships. Its software is used to manage sales logistics at dealerships. It also produces forms used in medicine and insurance.

Reynolds and Reynolds was founded in 1866 as a printer of standardized business forms. It began developing and marketing digital products in the 1960s. This was followed by a major downsizing of the printing division and subsequent advancements in its software products. By the 1980s, Reynolds and Reynolds had won contracts with all of the Big Three automotive manufacturers, as well as some insurance businesses. The company went public in 1961, but was re-formed as a private company in 2006, when it was merged with Universal Computer Systems, resulting in a culture clash between the two companies.

== History ==
=== Early history ===
Reynolds and Reynolds was founded by Lucius Reynolds and his brother-in-law, James Gardner, in June 1866 in Dayton, Ohio. It was a small printing shop founded with $500 in capital and originally named Reynolds and Gardner. It made standardized business documents using carbon copy paper. A year after Reynolds was founded, Gardner sold his interest in the company to co-founder Lucius' father, Ira Reynolds, and the company was renamed to its current namesake, Reynolds and Reynolds. Co-owners Ira and Lucius died in 1880 and 1913 respectively. The youngest of the Reynolds family, Edwin Stanton Reynolds, took over.

In 1927, Reynolds and Reynolds won a contract to provide all of the business forms for Chevrolet dealerships. The company opened new offices throughout the U.S. in the 1930s, and had 19 sales offices by the end of the decade. A controlling interest in the company was acquired in 1939 by Richard Hallam Grant Sr., ending the Reynolds family ownership. He became the company's president in 1941. A new printing facility was built in 1948 in Celina, Ohio, and another in 1953 in Dallas, Texas, in addition to the one built in Los Angeles in 1928. Reynolds became a public company in 1961. In the 1960s, Reynolds opened new printing facilities in North Hollywood, Los Angeles, New Jersey and Canada. In 1963, Reynolds expanded into Canada through the acquisition of the automotive business unit of Windsor Office Supply, forming Reynolds and Reynolds (Canada) Ltd. By the end of the decade it had about $50 million in revenues.

=== Establishment of software business ===
Reynolds and Reynolds first entered into the electronic accounting market with the acquisition of a Boston-based accounting software developer in 1960. The software division was doing well in the 1970s, but its products were out-of-date by the 1980s. At the time, data could not be shared between departments and only one user was allowed on the system at a time. Each computer came at a cost of more than $100,000. Even as the computer division grew, the company's overall business revenue declined due to paper business forms becoming obsolete. In 1986, the company acquired Arnold Corporation, which increased Reynolds' revenues 50 percent and expanded its market presence to other industries besides car dealerships. The head of the computers division, David Holmes, was appointed CEO in 1989. He led the company's first large-scale lay-off in the printing division, cutting headcount and manufacturing space in half. The employees resisted the changes he incorporated. According to Forbes, this move was necessary and led to increases in profit and revenues.

After Holmes retired, he was replaced by former IBM executive Lloyd G. "Buzz" Waterhouse, who created an eBusiness department to focus on internet technologies. In 2000, Reynolds also acquired the HAC Group, a learning, customer relationship management and web services company for retailers and manufacturers. The following year CarsDirect.com and Reynolds and Reynolds introduced a car shopping website called CarsDirect Connect. (Note: CarsDirect.com was later acquired by KKR Group) In November 2002, it acquired Networkcar Inc. (now Verizon Networkfleet) and further developed its telematics device, CAReader. This product communicates a car's mechanical status to a dealer. Reynolds sold Networkcar to Hughes Telematics for $17.7 million in 2006.

=== Acquisitions and growth ===
In the 1980s, Reynolds and Reynolds signed agreements with the rest of the Big Three automotive manufacturers, several major insurers, General Electric and others. In 1986 the company acquired National Medical Computer Services and a business forms company called Arnold Corporation. By the end of that year, Reynolds had more than $200 million in annual revenue, 42% of which came from business forms. Reynolds acquired several smaller technology companies in the 1990s and further developed its software products. Reynolds and Reynolds acquired PD Medical Systems in 1994, forming Reynolds Healthcare Systems. Reynolds Healthcare Systems later acquired a business document company, Fiscal Information, which serves radiologists. From 1994 to 1996, David Holmes led the acquisition of several other business forms and computer businesses outside the automotive industry for a total of $155 million. By 2000, Reynolds and Reynolds had revenues of $800 million and more than one-third of its users were General Motors dealerships. It sold the Information Solutions Group (ISG), which primarily sold business forms and supplies to non-automotive companies, that year to the Carlyle Group for $360 million.

On August 8, 2006, Reynolds and Reynolds announced it was becoming a private company through a $2.8 billion acquisition by Houston-based Universal Computer Systems (UCS). The combined organization had a 40% market share in the dealership management systems sector. According to Automotive News, there was a "major culture clash" between the two companies. For example, the new CEO would not hire smokers and required annual physicals to maintain health insurance.

=== Recent history ===
After the merger with UCS, Robert Brockman became CEO of the combined entity. He introduced more discipline to the company's software development, resulting in more modern software products and a greater breadth of features.

A series of legal disputes between Reynolds and General Motors (GM) began in 2007. Through a GM program called the Integrated Dealership Management System (GMIDMS), Reynolds provided software to GM dealerships through GM. When Reynolds would not make changes to its software requested by GM, GM alleged it was a breach of contract. A settlement was reached in 2008, which ended Reynolds' participation in GM's program.

In 2008, Reynolds acquired DiversiForm, a Beaverton, Oregon-based printer of forms and business documents for car dealerships. The terms of the deal were not disclosed. In August 2013, it acquired the newsletter company IMN. This was followed by an acquisition that November of the customer retention software vendor XtreamService, also for a non-disclosed sum. It acquired AddOnAuto in May 2014, which was the company's fifth acquisition in a little over twelve months. AddOnAuto develops software for shopping for car accessories. In 2017, Reynolds acquired Xpressdocs, a Fort Worth, Texas-based company specializing in the marketing needs of franchise organizations.

On February 14, 2020, Reynolds announced that they were acquiring GoMoto, a developer of a self-service kiosk technology for checking in at dealerships in North America.

In October 2020, federal court documents were unsealed showing that Brockman had been indicted for charges of money laundering, evidence tampering, destruction of evidence, and wire fraud totaling. Brockman is accused of using "a family charitable trust based in Bermuda and other offshore entities to hide assets from the Internal Revenue Service while failing to pay taxes", totaling $2 billion in untaxed income. Brockman pleaded not guilty and was released on a $1 million bond.

On December 17, 2020, Reynolds announced that they were acquiring ReconTRAC®, a developer of a web-based software that is meant to assist dealerships with the process of reconditioning used cars.

On June 8, 2021, Reynolds announced that they were acquiring Gubagoo, a leading provider of conversational commerce and digital retail tools for both automotive dealerships and OEMs in North America.

On July 29, 2022, Reynolds announced that they were acquiring Proton Technologies, Inc, a provider of cybersecurity and technology services in the automotive vertical.

On January 6, 2023, Reynolds and Reynolds announced the acquisition of American Guardian Warranty Services, an F&I Product and Service Provider which includes a multitude of protection plans, warranties, and aftermarket products.

On April 3, 2023, Reynolds and Reynolds announced the acquisition of DealerCorp Solutions, a software company that develops cloud-based solutions for dealerships in Canada.

On June 8, 2023, Reynolds and Reynolds announced the acquisition of AutoVision, a technology startup that will enhance the Reynolds Retail Management System with a suite of tools to retail used vehicles more efficiently and profitably.

On July 13, 2023, Reynolds and Reynolds announced the acquisition of Xzilon, a company that develops products that provide exterior and interior coating protection for vehicles.

== Current software and services ==
Reynolds and Reynolds is a software and document printing company that primarily serves the automotive industry. It develops and markets the ERA and POWER suites of auto dealership management systems. Its software is used for inventory, accounting, contract documents and other business logistics. For example, one Reynolds application called AddOnAuto can visualize what a car will look like with accessories, while docuPAD adds a touch-screen on top of a desk that customers use to go through vehicle sales paperwork and interact with options. Reynolds also provides paper business forms, consulting and training. It provides some software and services to other industries, like medical and insurance. Its customer service has been recognized with awards like the STAR (Software Technical Assistance Recognition) Award from The Help Desk Institute. It is one of the three largest vendors in the dealership management software segment.

=== Product history ===
Reynolds and Reynolds started as a printer of standardized business forms on carbon paper. By the 1940s, Reynolds' business was divided into four main areas: automotive, medical, custom forms and Post-Rite Peg Boards. Reynolds' first electronic accounting service was introduced in 1963. Its parts inventory software product, called Electronic Parts Inventory Control (EPIC), was released in beta in 1966. It was renamed upon full release the following year as RAPIC. This was followed by the accounting and management software called LEASe and an accounts receivable product.

At first clients sent hole-punched accounting records to a Reynolds processing center, which would print a complete accounting that is sent back to the client by mail. The development of modems and internet technology in the 1970s led to several advancements. Reynolds provided 3,600 specialized modems to dealerships between 1974 and 1978. The modems communicated with Reynolds' VIM-brand minicomputers at 80 Reynolds locations, which provided computing power and printed forms. This eliminated the need for clients to ship data to Reynolds in tapes and allowed daily access to online services. By the end of the 1970s, batch processing and computer processing centers were being phased out in response to personal computers kept at the dealership. In the years 1978 and 1982, Reynolds introduced VIM-brand computer systems that were kept at dealerships.

By 1986, the VIM-based dealer management computer systems had helped Reynolds acquire a 45 percent market-share and was on its fifth generation with 9,000 installations. In 1987 Reynolds moved to a software model with its first release of the ERA dealer management software, which was a complete rewrite of its prior programming. ERA allows users to manage logistics for sales, finance, service and parts across departments. That same year Reynolds developed a digital, graphical parts catalog program for selecting and ordering automotive parts. This was followed by the Vehicle Locators and Marketing Network sales toolsets.

By 1997, Reynolds and Reynolds had more than 30 applications for various functions of a car dealership. In February 2000, Reynolds formed a joint venture with Automatic Data Processing, Inc. and CCC Information Services, Inc. to create a web-based dealer-to-dealer parts network called ChoiceParts.

In January 2002, Reynolds and Reynolds announced it was switching from a Unix to a Windows-based system for its core software. This caused "a flurry of discussion in the automobile market." According to Automotive News, the Unix-based system could support more users, but the Microsoft software was compatible with more of the newer applications being used by dealerships. Reynolds also developed the Reynolds Generations Series Suite in collaboration with Microsoft, but the product was not successful in the marketplace. It was discontinued in 2005.

In 2011 Reynolds and Reynolds introduced the current version of its dealer management software, called ERA-IGNITE, which reduced the number of screens needed to perform tasks by two-thirds.

In 2024, Reynolds and Reynolds decided to end their digital advertising services.
