= Jim Kavanaugh =

American businessman (born 1963)

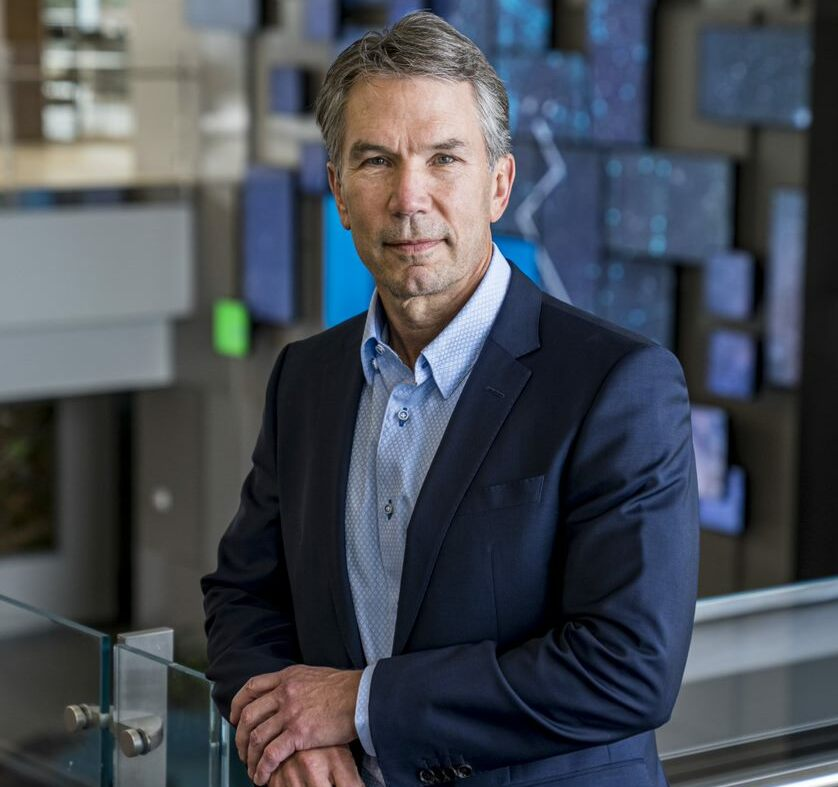
- Born: 1963 (age 62–63); United States
- Education: Saint Louis University
- Occupation: CEO of World Wide Technology
- Board member of: St. Louis Scott Gallagher Soccer Club; Saint Louis University; Stifel; Privoro
- Children: 3
- Website: www.wwt.com/people/jim-p-kavanaugh/

James P. Kavanaugh (born 1963) is an American businessman, and the CEO and co-founder of World Wide Technology.

== Early life ==
Kavanaugh received his Bsc. in Business administration from Saint Louis University in 1986.

=== Sports ===
Kavanaugh played soccer at Saint Louis University. In 1983, he was selected as Missouri amateur player of the year and competed for the United States in the 1983 Pan American Games. Kavanaugh was also on the U.S. men's team at the 1984 Summer Olympics.

In 1986, Kavanaugh was drafted to the Los Angeles Lazers, a Major Indoor Soccer League team, as the second overall pick. The following year, he was traded to the St. Louis Steamers. Kavanaugh was CEO of the United Soccer League's Saint Louis FC from 2014 – 2020, as well as president of the St. Louis Scott Gallagher Soccer Club. In 2012, Kavanaugh purchased a minority stake in the St. Louis Blues hockey team. He is also a minority investor in St. Louis City SC, a Major League Soccer franchise launched in 2023.

== Career ==
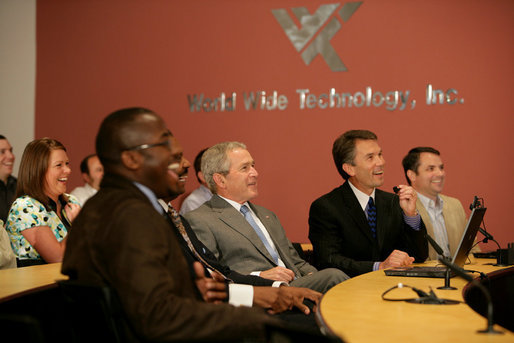
Kavanaugh with President George W. Bush in 2008

Kavanaugh worked as a sales manager for Future Electronics. In 1990, Kavanaugh and David Steward co-founded World Wide Technology (WWT), a company that provides technology products and services. He was chief executive officer (CEO), while the company grew to billions of dollars in revenue. By 2015 it had become one of the largest companies in the St. Louis area. In 2021, WWT revenues were over $13 billion.

== Awards ==
- 2022: Junior Achievement of Greater St. Louis Hall of Fame
