= Robert L. Johnson =

American businessman (born 1946)

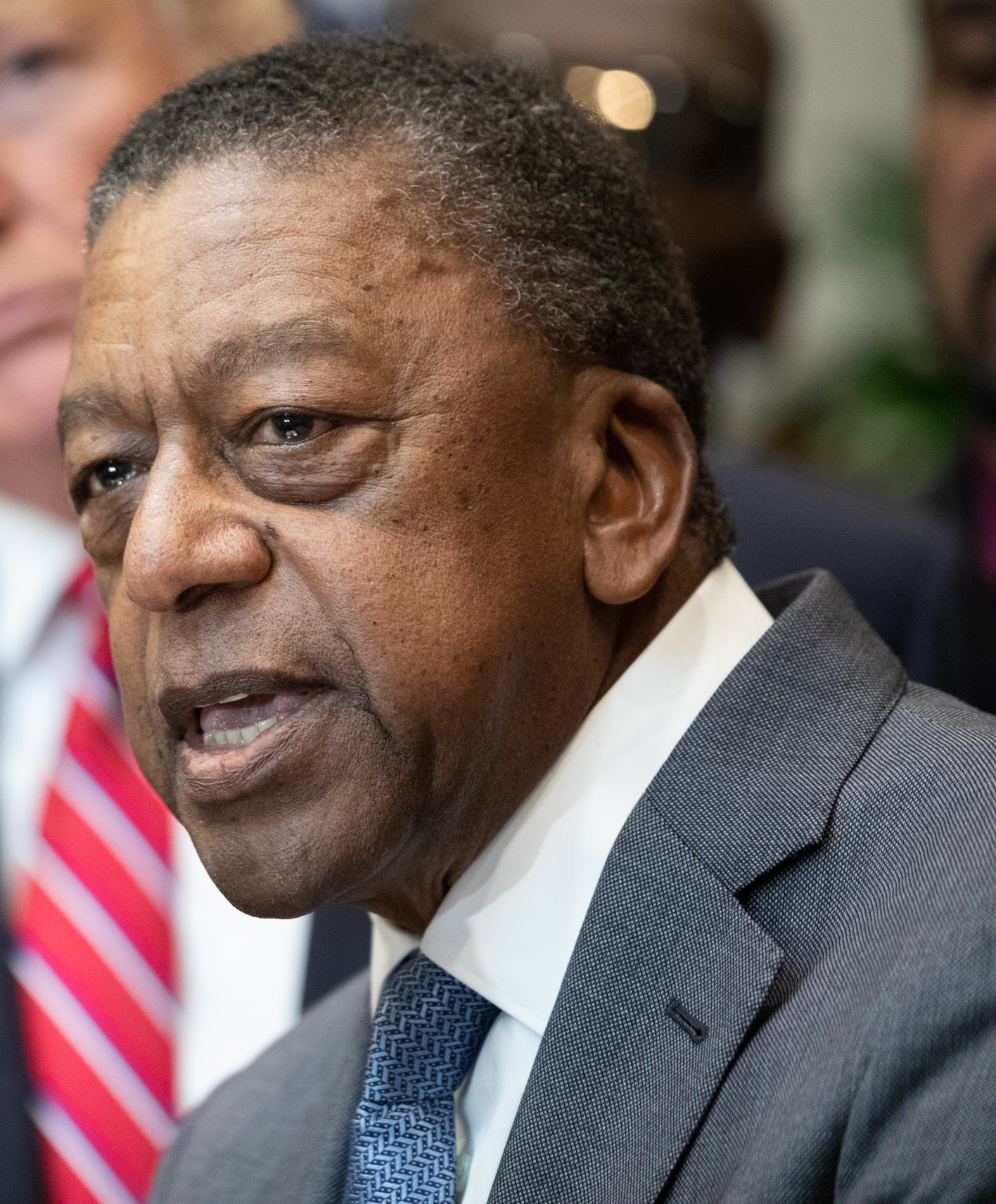
- Johnson in 2018
- Born: Robert Louis Johnson; April 8, 1946 (age 80); Hickory, Mississippi, U.S.
- Education: University of Illinois at Urbana–Champaign (BA); Princeton University (MPA)
- Occupations: Entrepreneur; media executive; investor
- Years active: 1979–present
- Known for: Co-founder of BET
- Spouses: Sheila Johnson (m. 1969; div. 2001) Lauren Wooden (m. 2016; div. 2020)
- Children: 2
- Website: Official website

Robert Louis Johnson (born April 8, 1946) is an American entrepreneur, media magnate, executive, philanthropist, and investor. He is the co-founder of BET, which was acquired by Viacom in 2001. He also founded RLJ Companies, a holding company that invests in various business sectors. Johnson is the former majority owner of the Charlotte Bobcats (now Charlotte Hornets). He became the first African American billionaire in 2001. Johnson's companies have counted among the most prominent African-American businesses in the late twentieth and early twenty-first centuries.

== Early life and education ==
Johnson was born in 1946 in Hickory, Mississippi, the ninth out of ten children to Edna and Archie Johnson. His mother was a schoolteacher and his father was a farmer. His parents moved the family to Freeport, Illinois, when he was a child. He was an honors student in high school. Johnson graduated from the University of Illinois in 1968 with a bachelor's degree in social studies. While at the University of Illinois, Johnson became a member of the Beta chapter of Kappa Alpha Psi fraternity. He received an master's degree in public affairs from the Woodrow Wilson School at Princeton University in 1972.

== Career ==
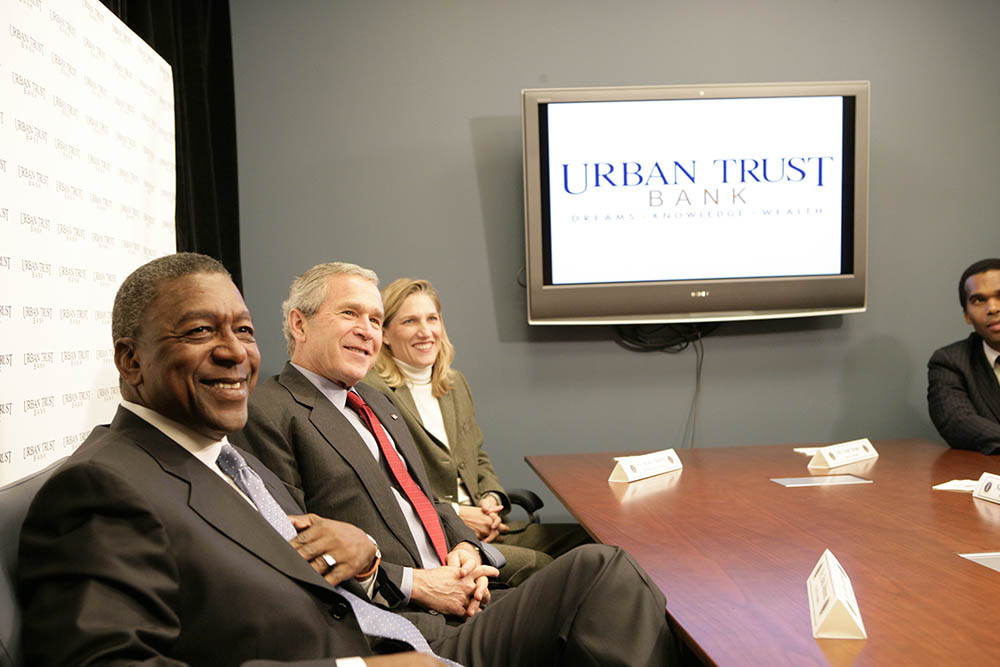
President George W. Bush sits with Johnson during a meeting to discuss the economy with small business owners and community bankers in 2006

After graduating from Princeton, Johnson found a job in Washington, D.C., which introduced him to the television industry. He served as the public affairs director for the Corporation for Public Broadcasting. Around the same time he also worked as the director of communications for the Washington, D.C. office of the National Urban League. Johnson worked as a press secretary for Congressman Walter E. Fauntroy. He later became vice president of government relations at the National Cable and Television Association (NCTA). In 1980, Johnson launched Black Entertainment Television, which became a full-fledged channel in 1983.

Johnson left NCTA in 1979 to create Black Entertainment Television, the first cable television network aimed at black Americans. When the network launched in 1980, it only aired for two hours on Friday night. BET first turned a profit in 1985 and it became the first black-controlled company listed on the New York Stock Exchange in 1991. In 1998, Johnson and Liberty Media bought all outstanding shares of the company. This purchase gave Johnson 42% of the company. Viacom acquired BET in 2001 for a reported $3 billion; Johnson earned over $1 billion from the sale, making him the first black American billionaire. He remained BET CEO until 2006.

Johnson founded The RLJ Companies, a holding company with a diverse portfolio including hotel real estate investment, private equity, financial services, asset management, automobile dealerships, sports and entertainment, and Video lottery terminal gaming. The RLJ Companies is headquartered in Bethesda, Maryland.

By January 2009, Ion Media had another subchannel network, Urban TV, in the works with him targeted to black Americans. Axiom Bank N.A. Maitland, Florida, was founded by Robert Johnson, who also founded the Black Entertainment Network (BET). As of 2013, Johnson was a member of the board of directors for RLJ Lodging Trust, RLJ Entertainment, Inc., KB Home, Lowe's Companies, Inc., Strayer Education, Think Finance, Inc., NBA Board of Governors, The Business Council, and the Smithsonian Institution's National Museum of African American History and Culture. Johnson has also served as a member of the board of directors for several other companies and organizations, including US Airways, Hilton Hotels, General Mills, the United Negro College Fund, and Deutsche Bank's Americas Advisory Board.

Johnson became the first black American majority club owner of a major American sports league team with his 2002 purchase of the Charlotte Bobcats. In 2010, Johnson sold his majority stake in the Charlotte Bobcats to Michael Jordan.

In 2016, Johnson finalized a partnership agreement with AMC Networks through his RLJ Company after launching his own video on demand streaming service Urban Movie Channel in 2014. According to the agreement, AMC will use its programming and distribution clout to benefit Acorn and UMC. Additionally, the RLJ-AMC partnership will allow for greater investment in content from black American creatives, Johnson emphasized. The agreement called for AMC to provide RLJ with a $60 million loan on a seven-year term and $5 million on a one-year term. AMC has received warrants to purchase at least 20 million shares or the equivalent of 50.1% of the company. The time frame for exercising those warrants is open-ended, AMC said.

== Philanthropy ==
In 2011, Johnson worked with Morgan Freeman to raise funds for hurricane preparedness in the Bahamas. Johnson released a neckwear line in coordination with PVH and The Ella Rose Collection, the RLJ Ella Rose Africa Tie Collection, in 2012 to benefit the charitable organization Malaria No More.

In 2007, Johnson created the Liberia Enterprise Development Fund with a $30 million investment. The fund provides credit for Liberian entrepreneurs.

== Political activity ==
=== Role in 2008 election ===
During the 2008 Democratic Party presidential primaries, Johnson was a prominent surrogate for Hillary Clinton's presidential campaign. During the campaign, he was a "HillRaiser", a term for a leading fundraiser for Clinton's campaign. Following her defeat in the primary, Johnson wrote to members of the Congressional Black Caucus (CBC), where he urged representatives to lobby Obama to select Clinton as his running mate.

==== January 2008 Obama remarks controversy ====
In January 2008, Johnson attracted controversy over remarks made about Barack Obama, Clinton's primary rival, which were interpreted as a criticism of Obama's admitted use of drugs (marijuana and cocaine) in his youth:

As an African-American, I'm frankly insulted that the Obama campaign would imply that we are so stupid that we would think Bill and Hillary Clinton, who have been deeply and emotionally involved in black issues when Barack Obama was doing something in the neighborhood that I won't say what he was doing, [but] he said it in his book.

The Clinton campaign denied that Johnson was referring to Obama's past drug use, stating that his comments were referring to Obama's work as a community organizer. Critics accused Johnson of hypocrisy, given that BET has prominently featured artists that glorify drug use and distribution. On January 17, 2008, Johnson sent Obama the following apology:

I'm writing to apologize to you and your family personally for the un-called-for comments I made at a recent Clinton event. In my zeal to support Senator Clinton, I made some very inappropriate remarks for which I am truly sorry. I hope that you will accept this apology. Good luck on the campaign trail.

On April 14, 2008, Johnson made comments to the effect that Obama would not be the Democratic Party's leading candidate if he were not black, in defense of a similar comment made by Geraldine Ferraro. He also went on to say "I make a joke about Obama doing drugs [and it's] 'Oh my God, a black man tearing down another black man.'"

=== Political activity since 2016 ===
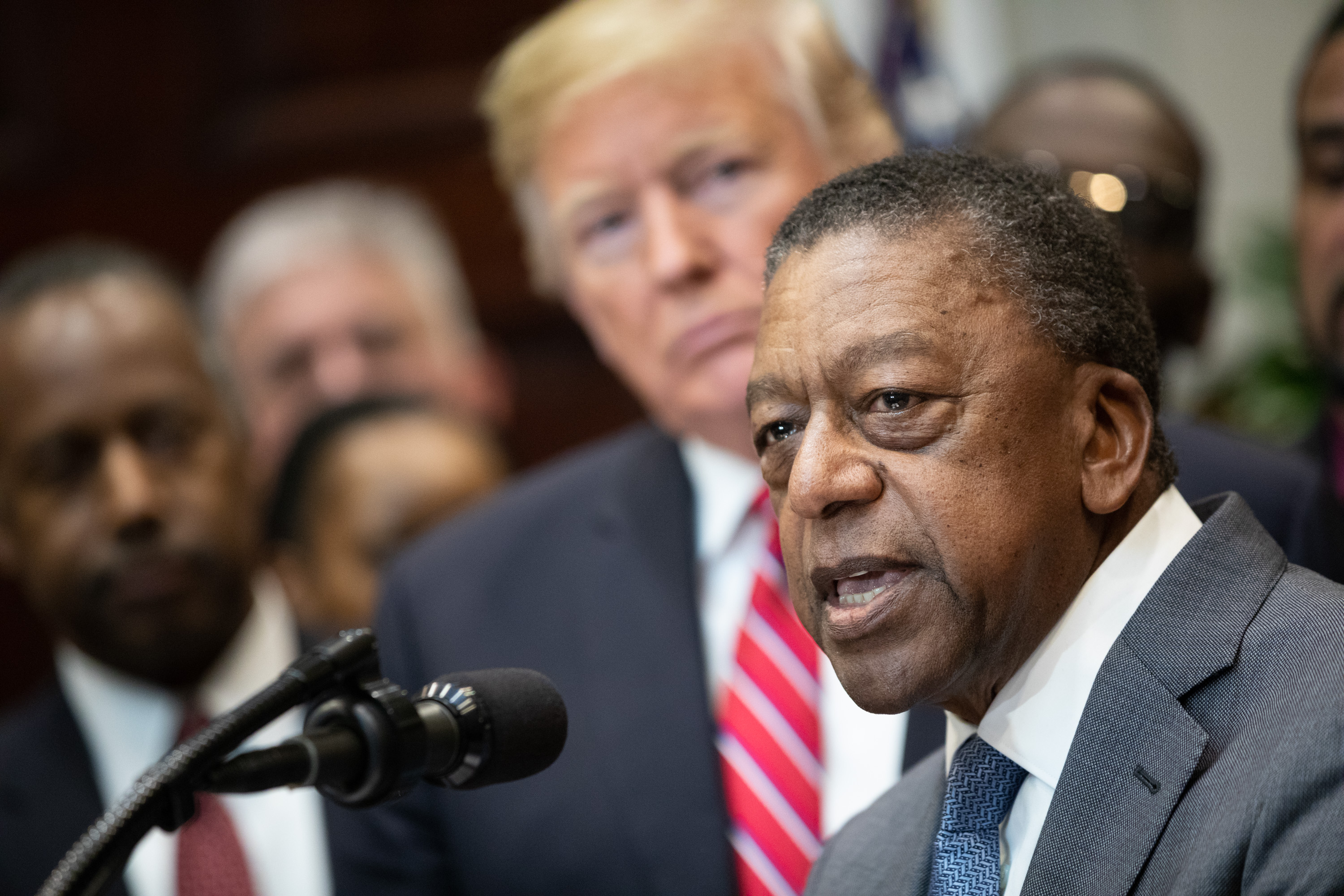
Johnson speaking at a signing ceremony for an executive order by President Donald Trump on December 12, 2018

Following Donald Trump's victory in the 2016 presidential election, Johnson met with the then-president-elect for a meeting at Trump International Golf Club. Johnson stated in a CNBC interview that he had known Trump personally for years, and urged Black Americans to give Trump a chance. Johnson argued that Black voters should not be wedded to either party in the American two-party system, stating that overwhelming Black support for the Democratic Party means "we are locked into one party which undoubtedly limits and dilutes our voting power". In 2018, he stated that he declined an unspecified position in the Trump Administration.

In 2019, Johnson praised Trump's economic policies, stating that he "[gives] the president a lot of credit for moving the economy in a positive direction that’s benefiting a large amount of Americans". He argued that tax cuts implemented under Trump helped stimulate the economy and inspire confidence among businesspeople. He stated that the Democratic Party moved too far to the left, and indicated he did not have a "particular candidate" he supported in the 2020 Democratic primary.

In September 2020, during the 2020 general election, Johnson made comments that were interpreted as him indicating a preference for Trump's reelection candidacy over Joe Biden's campaign. However, CNBC noted that "Johnson, when pressed, refused to outright endorse Trump". During the interview, Johnson stated that "[w]here I come out as a businessman, I will take the devil I know over the devil I don't know anytime of the week."

== Personal life ==
Johnson married Sheila Johnson in 1969. They divorced in 2001 and have two children. She is CEO of Salamander Hotels and Resorts and owner of Salamander Innisbrook Resort and Golf Club in Palm Harbor. Johnson began dating Lauren Wooden, who is 33 years his junior, in 2010. As of 2016, Wooden was pursuing an international business-management doctorate in Paris. They married in May 2016 with Greg Mathis officiating. They later divorced in 2020.

== See also ==
- List of black American firsts
- Black billionaires

Sporting positions
Preceded by George Shinn as Charlotte Hornets	Charlotte Bobcats owner 2004–2010	Succeeded by Michael Jordan
