= TBX (company) =

American technology and logistics company

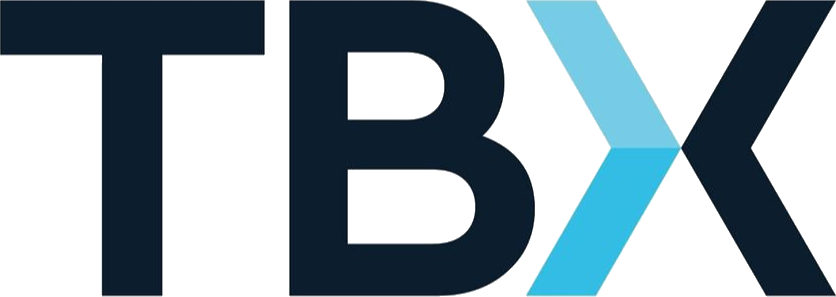
- Industry: Technology; Information Technology
- Founded: 1999; 26 years ago
- Founders: David Steward; Jim Kavanaugh
- Headquarters: St. Louis, Missouri
- Website: tbxservices.com

TBX (formerly known as Telcobuy) is an American technology and supply chain management company founded by David Steward and Jim Kavanaugh in 1999. The company provides enterprise networking services and data center security. It is also a reseller of information technology hardware.

Headquartered in St. Louis, Missouri, the company operates more than 2 million square feet of warehousing, distribution, and integration space throughout the United States. It is a privately held Minority Business Enterprise (MBE).

== History ==
Telcobuy.com, LLC was created in 1999 by World Wide Technology (WWT) and its founders David Steward and Jim Kavanaugh as a telecom-focused affiliate. During its first year of business, the company sold 94 percent of its equipment inventory to SBC Communications Inc., Bell Atlantic Corp. and GTE Corp.

The company filed a registration statement for an initial public offering in 2000 remained privately held. In 2022, WWT rebranded the Telcobuy business as TBX.

== Operations ==
TBX has included supplier diversity in its supply chain — spending more than $57 million with minorities, women, and Service Disabled Veteran-Owned Businesses (SDVOB) since 2001.

In October 2009, the company partnered with IBM for Cisco systems as a Cisco Certified Gold Partner. The company ships in-stock Cisco equipment directly from its inventory, while non-stocked items are processed and drop-shipped from Cisco.

== See also ==
- World Wide Technology
