= Brian Sheth =

American businessman

Brian N. Sheth
- Born: November 25, 1975 (age 50)
- Education: University of Pennsylvania
- Occupation: Former President of Vista Equity Partners

Brian N. Sheth (born 1975) is an American billionaire businessman, and the former president of Vista Equity Partners, a private equity fund based in Austin, Texas. Sheth was listed in the Forbes 2018 World Billionaires list with an estimated net worth of $2 billion. He was included in Forbes and Fortune’s “40 under 40” lists in 2015. In 2020, Forbes ranked him No. 359 in their list of the richest people in the US.

== Early life ==
Sheth's father was an immigrant from India who worked in finance and marketing, and his Irish Catholic mother worked as an insurance analyst.

== Education and career ==
Sheth holds a B.S. in economics from the University of Pennsylvania.

He worked in the mergers and acquisitions groups at Goldman Sachs and Deutsche Morgan Grenfell, where he advised clients on software, hardware, semiconductors, and online media. Sheth then worked at Bain Capital, where he focused on leveraged buyouts of technology companies.

In 2000, Sheth joined Vista Equity Partners as vice president. In 2010, Sheth became president, and was given the title of co-founder. In November 2020, Sheth resigned from Vista.

In 2011, Sheth established the Sangreal Foundation, which is dedicated to wildlife conservation.
