= Robert F. Smith (investor) =

American businessman and philanthropist (born 1962)

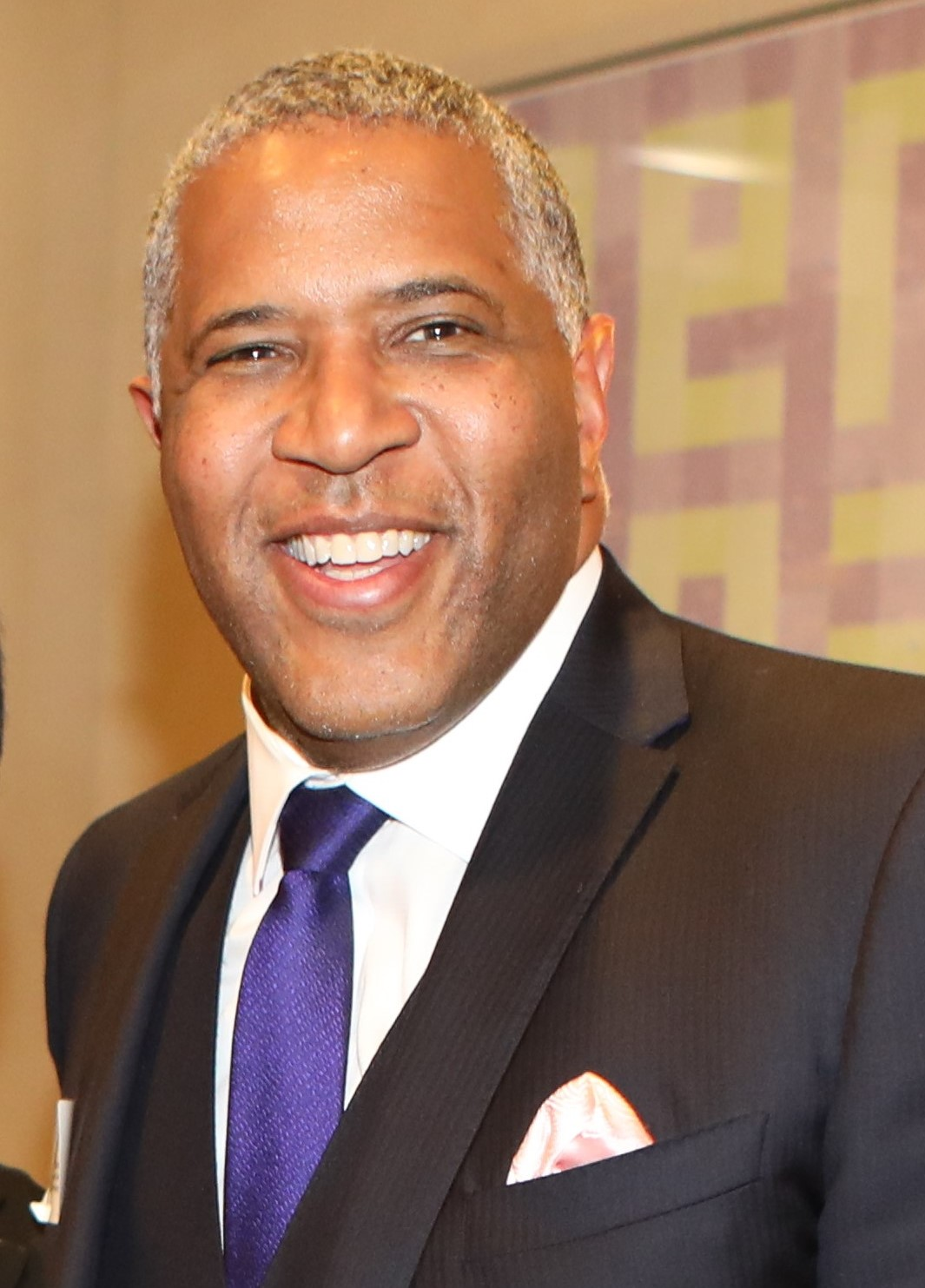
- Robert F. Smith in 2018
- Born: Robert Frederick Smith; December 1, 1962 (age 63); Denver, Colorado, U.S.
- Education: Cornell University (BEng); Columbia University (MBA)
- Occupations: Businessman, philanthropist
- Title: Founder Chairman & CEO, Vista Equity Partners
- Spouses: Suzanne McFayden (m. 1988; div. 2014) Hope Dworaczyk (m. 2015)
- Children: 7
- Website: robertsmith.com

Robert Frederick Smith (born December 1, 1962) is an American businessman. He is the founder, chairman, and CEO of private equity firm Vista Equity Partners. Globally, Smith is among The World's Billionaires with a net worth exceeding US$10.6 billion as of 2025.

== Early life ==
Smith was born in Denver, Colorado, the fourth generation in his family to be born in Colorado. His parents were Dr. William Robert Smith, an elementary school principal, and Dr. Sylvia Myrna Smith, the principal of George Washington High School. Both parents had PhDs in education.

Smith grew up in a predominantly African-American middle class neighborhood in East Denver. When he was an infant, his mother carried him to the March on Washington, where Martin Luther King Jr. delivered his "I Have a Dream" speech.

== Education and early career ==
Smith attended East High School ('81) in Denver. While in high school, he applied for an internship at Bell Labs, but was told the program was intended for college students. Smith persisted, calling each Monday for five months. When a student from M.I.T. did not show up, he got the position, and that summer he developed a reliability test for semiconductors.

Smith earned a bachelor's degree in chemical engineering from Cornell University in 1985. While there, he won the Procter and Gamble Technical Excellence Award for chemical engineering. In 1982 he became a brother of Alpha Phi Alpha (ΑΦΑ) fraternity.

After graduating from Cornell, Smith worked at Goodyear Tire and Rubber Company and Air Products & Chemicals. Later, he worked at Kraft General Foods as a chemical engineer, and registered two United States and two European patents as the principal inventor.

In 1994, he received his Master of Business Administration from Columbia University, with concentrations in finance and marketing.

From 1994 to 2000, after receiving his MBA he worked for investment bank Goldman Sachs in technology investment banking. He first worked for it in New York City, and then moved to Silicon Valley in 1997 where he started Goldman's technology-focused merger and acquisitions efforts there. He advised on $50 billion in merger and acquisition activity with companies such as Apple, Microsoft, Texas Instruments, eBay, and Yahoo.

== Vista Equity Partners ==
In 2000, Smith founded Vista Equity Partners, an Austin, Texas-based private equity and venture capital firm of which he is the principal founder, chairman, and chief executive. Vista purchased enterprise software businesses and brought performance improvements to the businesses. According to Black Enterprise magazine, Smith was credited with consistently generating a 30% rate of return for his investors from the company's inception through 2020. As of 2019, Vista Equity Partners was the fourth-largest enterprise software company, after Microsoft, Oracle, and SAP, including all their holdings. Vista has invested in companies such as STATS, Ping Identity, and Jio. As of 2019, Vista Equity Partners had closed more than $46 billion of funding.

In the 2020s, Vista expanded its artificial intelligence (AI) initiatives across its portfolio companies. Smith stated in 2024 that generative AI was being adopted throughout the firm's investments, including through AI-assisted software development tools intended to improve productivity and software development. In 2026, CNBC reported that Vista had developed an “agentic factory” initiative focused on deploying agentic AI technologies across its portfolio companies, with Smith describing AI adoption as an important factor in the future of enterprise software.

In July 2026, the company had $103 billion in assets under management.

== Tax fraud case and tax fine ==
In the 1990s, businessman Robert T. Brockman approached Smith about creating a private equity fund, and offered to back the initial fund. As part of the deal, Brockman required an offshore trust be set up to conceal earnings from tax authorities and avoid litigation in US courts. Brockman also required that the first fund be located in the Cayman Islands, and set aside some of the interest earned to protect him against losses. Brockman's proposal was a "take-it-or-leave-it offer". According to Smith's later non-prosecution agreement, Brockman dictated "the unique terms and unorthodox structure to the arrangement" and he accepted the offer as a "unique business opportunity he eagerly wanted to pursue". Brockman's lawyer helped Smith set up the offshore entity.

Following the introduction of the Swiss Bank Program by the DOJ, Smith filed Foreign Bank Account Reports (FBARs) and amended tax returns with assistance from experts, including former IRS Commissioner Fred Goldberg. The IRS rejected Smith's disclosures, and in 2015, an audit completed by the IRS found "no badges of fraud" related to Smith's 2013 amended tax returns.

Smith is mentioned in the 2021 Pandora Papers alongside Robert Brockman. Both were clients of CILTrust, a trust operated by Glenn Godfrey, a former attorney general of Belize. In April of 2021, the lawyer who established the trust on Smith's behalf was indited for allegedly committing fraud. The United States Department of Justice accused Smith of setting up the trust for the purpose of hiding assets from the IRS.

In October 2020, Smith entered into a non-prosecution agreement with the DOJ, agreeing to assist them in a separate case against Brockman who was charged that month with what the DOJ called the "largest ever" tax fraud scheme by a U.S. citizen. This was a part of Smith's settlement on his own charges. Smith's non-prosecution agreement settlement required him to pay a penalty of $139 million. In the agreement, Smith admitted that he had "engaged in an illegal scheme to conceal income and evade taxes". Brockman died in August 2022, while his trial was pending.

=== Reputation management ===
In May 2026, The New York Times reported how Terakeet was hired by several prominent clients including Smith to improve their reputation and Google search results for past misdeeds such as the past tax fraud case that Smith was involved in.

== Philanthropy ==
In 2015, Smith sponsored the college education of all returned Boko Haram girls. The following year, in 2016, Smith donated $20 million to the National Museum of African American History and Culture.

That same year, he committed $50 million to Cornell University, which subsequently named the Robert Frederick Smith School of Chemical and Biomolecular Engineering in his honor.

In 2018, Smith donated $2.5 million to the Prostate Cancer Foundation and $1 million to the Cultural Performance Center at the Denny Farrell Riverbank State Park in Harlem, which was later renamed the Robert Frederick Smith Center for Performing Arts.

In January 2019, Smith donated $1.5 million to Morehouse College to be used for the Robert Frederick Smith Scholars Program and a campus park. Later that year, on May 19, during his commencement speech at Morehouse College, Smith announced he would pay off the entire student loan debt of the 2019 Morehouse graduating class. The graduating class consisted of 396 students, and those students owed a reported $34 million in student loan debt (including the debt incurred by parents and guardians).

Through Fund II Foundation, Smith established internXL in 2019 to help match internship candidates with paid internships. That same year, he made a gift to buy and preserve the homes of Martin Luther King Jr. through the National Park Service. The following year, in a June 2020 report, Time announced the launch of Smith’s Student Freedom Initiative (SFI) with a contribution of $50 million from Fund II Foundation to benefit HBCU students.

In February 2022, Smith and SFI partnered with Prudential Financial to provide up to $1.8 million in microgrants to students of HBCUs. In May 2022, Smith donated $15 million to Cornell University to support engineering students from historically underrepresented communities. The gift established an undergraduate scholarship fund providing grants of up to $45,000 annually for up to seven students from urban high schools, as well as graduate fellowships for 12 master’s students and five doctoral students who previously attended HBCUs.

In June 2023, Smith donated to the launch of a new branch location of Grameen America in Atlanta, Georgia, to help support entrepreneurial women of color. Smith has also donated $300,000 to Jane Goodall's youth environmental program Roots & Shoots.

== Politics ==
In December 2022, Smith spoke out against anti-Semitism together with New York City Mayor Eric Adams, Reverends Al Sharpton and Conrad Tillard, Shmuley Boteach, and Elisha Wiesel. The group hosted a joint Hanukkah and Kwanzaa ceremony at Carnegie Hall.

== Other ventures ==
In 2014, Smith became the founding director and president of Fund II Foundation.

Smith became the board chairman of Carnegie Hall in 2016, the first African-American to hold that position; he had been a member of the board since 2013. Since 2018, Smith has been a board member of the Louis Armstrong House Museum.

In June 2020, Smith shared a plan called the 2% Solution, in which large corporations would use 2% of their annual net income over the span of ten years to empower minority communities.

In August 2025, Smith released his book, Lead Boldly, which focuses on leadership and values related to seven speeches of Martin Luther King Jr.

== Honors and awards ==
Smith has received a number of awards throughout his life, including the Ripple of Hope Award from the Robert F. Kennedy Center for Justice and Human Rights in 2010, an inclusion in the Time 100 in 2020, and the National Equal Justice Award by the Legal Defense and Educational Fund.

Smith has also received honorary doctorates from Huston-Tillotson University in 2014, and Morehouse College in 2019.

== Personal life ==
In 1988, Smith married his first wife, fellow Cornell alum Suzanne McFayden. They divorced in 2014. Smith married Hope Dworaczyk, the founder and CEO of skincare company MUTHA, a former Playboy playmate, healthy living advocate, and fashion editor, on July 25, 2015, after she gave birth to their first child in December 2014. Smith has three children with his first wife. He also has two sons and two daughters with his wife Hope. Smith owns homes in Austin, Texas; Malibu, California; New York City; Denver; and Florida.

Smith partnered with businessman Matthew Burkett to purchase the historic Lincoln Hills, Colorado property in Gilpin County in 2007 and convert it into an exclusive invitation-only fly fishing club. Lincoln Hills was founded in 1922 as a destination summer resort for Black families. He now uses it to host musicians and underprivileged schoolchildren.

In a 2018 cover story, Forbes stated that Smith had passed Oprah Winfrey as the wealthiest African American. In 2025 Bloomberg reported Smith's net worth to be $10.6 billion.

== See also ==
- African American upper class
- Black billionaires
- Black elite
