= World Wide Technology =

American technology company

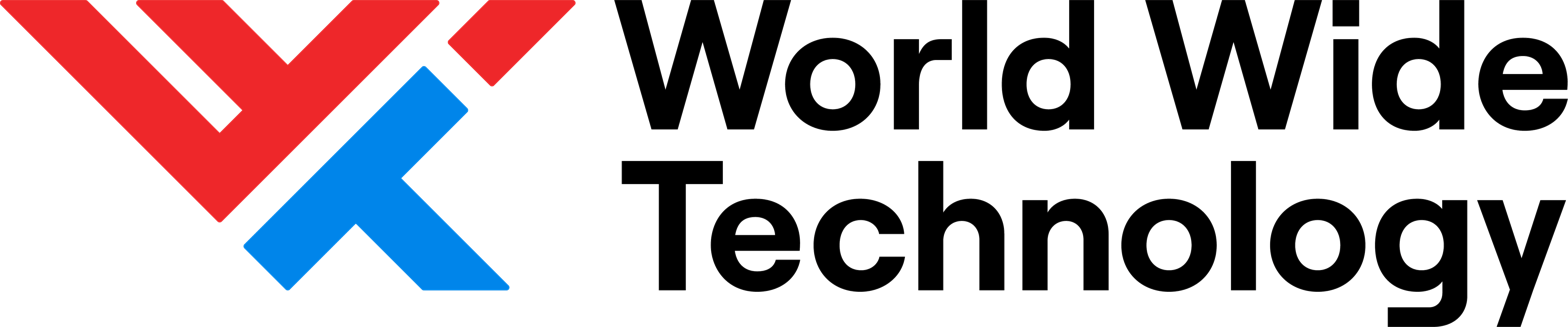
- Type: Technology
- Founded: 1990
- Founders: David Steward (Chairman); Jim Kavanaugh (CEO)
- Headquarters: Maryland Heights, Missouri, United States of America
- Revenue: $20 billion (2024)
- Number of employees: 14,000 (2025)
- Website: wwt.com

World Wide Technology (WWT) is an American privately-held technology services company based in St. Louis, Missouri. The company has an annual revenue of $20 billion (the 19th largest private company in the US and the biggest black-owned company in the US) and employs over 14,000 people. WWT works in the areas of cloud computing, computer security, data centers, data analytics and artificial intelligence, computer networks, application software development, cell phone carrier networking, and consulting services.

== History ==
World Wide Technology was co-founded by David Steward and Jim Kavanaugh in July 1990 as a reseller of technology equipment.

In 1994, WWT entered into a partnership with Cisco Systems to resell hardware and software. WWT also established partnerships with technology companies including Dell, Hewlett Packard Enterprise, Intel, Microsoft, NetApp, F5, Tanium and VMware.

WWT opened its first warehouse in 1996 and operates more than 20 facilities with five million square feet of warehousing, distribution and integration space.

In 1999, Telcobuy.com, LLC, was founded as a separate company, owned by WWT, Steward and Kavanaugh. Telcobuy planned an initial public offering of about $100 million, but as the dot-com bubble burst, the plan was withdrawn in the early 2000s recession. In January 2003, it was merged back into WWT under a holding company.

WWT created its first large-scale integration lab in St. Louis to increase capacity for secure system configuration. Additional integration labs were established in Europe and Asia, with locations in Amsterdam and Singapore opening in 2015, and Mumbai in 2019.

In 2009, WWT opened its Advanced Technology Center to allow engineers, customers and partners to evaluate hardware and software. The Advanced Technology Center was made accessible online.

In a lawsuit filed in March 2025, it was alleged that Missouri state officials in the Office of Administration unlawfully favored World Wide Technology when awarding lucrative IT contracts in a manner that bypassed competitive bidding laws.

== Golf ==
World Wide Technology hosts the World Wide Technology championship, a golf tournament on the PGA Tour. The tournament debuted in 2007 and is played on the El Cardonal golf course at the Diamante Cabo San Lucas resort.

== Acquisitions ==
World Wide Technology purchased Baltimore, Maryland-based Performance Technology Group in January 2010 for an undisclosed amount.

In 2015, WWT acquired St. Louis software company Asynchrony.

In 2025, WWT completed the acquisition of Softchoice Corporation.

== Awards and recognition ==
- In 2020, WWT received Webby Awards in the Health & Fitness and People's Voice categories for its St. Jude Children's Research Hospital Patient Care App.
- WWT has been named on Fortune's 100 Best Companies to Work For list from 2012 to 2026.
- In 2021, Time named WWT among the 100 Most Influential Companies, in the "Leaders" category.
- In 2024, WWT was named one of Fast Company’s Best Workplaces for Innovators.
- In 2026, WWT received two Webby Awards for its 2026 Special Olympics USA Games "Champions" app.

== Sponsorships ==
From 2018-2021, WWT sponsored Richard Petty Motorsports driver "Bubba" Wallace Jr.

In 2019, WWT announced a naming rights sponsorship of Gateway Motorsports Park, now known as the World Wide Technology Raceway.

WWT also sponsors PGA golfers Erik van Rooyen and Austin Eckroat, as well as PGA Tour Champions golfer Billy Andrade and LPGA player Lauren Stephenson.
