= Vista Equity Partners =

American investment firm

Vista Equity Partners Management, LLC
- Type: Private
- Industry: Private credit
- Founded: 2000; 26 years ago
- Founder: Robert F. Smith
- Headquarters: Austin, Texas, US
- Number of locations: 6
- Key people: David Breach (president)
- AUM: US$103 billion (2026)
- Number of employees: 700 (2025)
- Website: vistaequitypartners.com

Vista Equity Partners Management, LLC (Vista) is an American private equity firm that invests in software businesses and manages over $103 billion in assets.

== History ==
=== 2000–2009 ===
Founded in 2000 by American businessman Robert F. Smith, Vista Equity Partners opened its first office in San Francisco that same year. In November 2008, it closed a funding round for its first institutional fund, Flagship Fund III, and raised a total of $1.3 billion.

=== 2010–2019 ===
In 2010, Vista closed its First Foundation Fund that targeted middle-market companies. Also in 2010, Brian N. Sheth was promoted to president and awarded the title of co-founder of the firm. He remained in this role until 2020.

After opening an office in Austin, Texas in 2011, Vista has added several private equity and credit funds to its portfolio; its first credit fund raised $196 million. In 2017, the firm raised $560 million for its first fund to invest in early-stage enterprise software companies.

In September 2019, Vista raised $16 billion for its flagship fund, which was the largest technology-focused fund raised by an independent private equity firm at the time. That same year, Vista started a permanent capital investment fund and took its first company public with Ping Identity.

=== 2020–present ===
In October 2020, after being named in a tax evasion case along with investor Robert T. Brockman, Vista CEO Robert F. Smith signed a non-prosecution agreement with the IRS, agreeing to pay $139 million and testify against Brockman. In August 2022, the year after the announcement that its COO David Breach would be its new president, it agreed to acquire tax automation software platform maker Avalara for $8.4 billion including debt.

In September 2023, a month after it was reported that it had $100 billion in assets, the company launched Vista Credit Strategic Lending, a company focused on investments in enterprise software, data, and credit. In October, Vista, along with Blackstone acquired Energy Exemplar, an Australian energy software company for approximately $1.6 billion.

In 2025, Vista launched VistaOne, opening direct access to its private equity platform for eligible private investors outside the United States. In June, the firm ranked 20th in Private Equity International's PEI 300 ranking of the largest private equity firms in the world.

In July 2025, two months after agreeing to buy enterprise resource planning provider Acumatica for $2 billion, the company sold its minority stake in Cvent to Blackstone in a deal valued at $1.3 billion. On October 27, Vista closed a deal to acquire a majority stake in the Swiss software company Nexthink, valuing it at US$3 billion.
