= Robert L. Shook =

American author (born 1938)

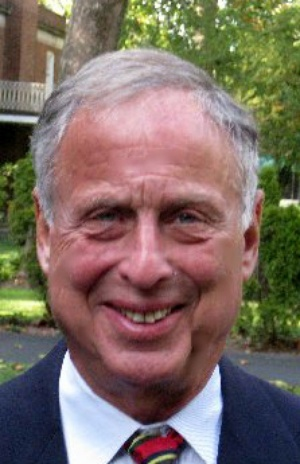
- Born: April 7, 1938 (age 88); Pittsburgh, Pennsylvania, U.S.
- Education: Ohio State University
- Occupation: Author
- Years active: 1974–present
- Website: www.robertlshook.com

Robert L. Shook (born April 7, 1938) is an American author who specializes in business books.

== Career ==
Shook's early books were mainly about selling and entrepreneurship. He has written several books profiling successful Americans. These books include: The Entrepreneurs, The Real Estate People, The chief executive officers, and Why Didn't I think of That, with chapters on products such as the Pet Rock, the Slinky, the Mood ring, the Hula hoop and the Frisbee.

He collaborated with Francis "Buck" Rodgers, the senior vice president of worldwide marketing at IBM to write The IBM Way. He has been the chief proselytizer of the IBM religion...preaching the beliefs to the legions of IBM employees and thousands of outsiders. The book argues that "the closer one gets to IBM, the more it becomes apparent that the majority of employees, whatever their personal ties, are, as professionals, unusually upright and uniformly dedicated to the notion that the customer pays their salaries.".

In Honda: An American Success Story, Shook recounts Honda's history, and then looks at the reasons for its success. "The Honda Way comprises many different beliefs, none of which is unique," he writes. "Rather it is the application of those beliefs that is uniquely Honda."

Longaberger: An American Success Story, the autobiography of basket entrepreneur Dave Longaberger with which Shook was involved, was a number one best seller on The New York Times best seller list in 2001.

Shook has interviewed many of the most successful people in the U.S. Miracle Medicines required him to interview scientists and researchers in the pharmaceutical industry. He says, "The scientists are the most dedicated people I have ever met in my life. They’re in their labs working 60, 70, 80 hours a week to benefit mankind. A vast majority of them will never make a discovery that gets into the marketplace."

== Books ==
- How to be The Complete Professional Salesman by Robert L. Shook (Frederick Fell Publishers, Inc., 1974) ISBN 8122304222
- Total Commitment by Robert L. Shook and Ronald Bingaman (Frederick Fell Publishers, Inc., 1975) ISBN 0811902323
- Winning Images (Macmillan Publishing Co., Inc., 1975) ISBN 0-02-610540-3
- Ten Greatest Salespersons (Harper & Row Publishers, Inc., 1978) ISBN 0-06-0140127
- Successful Telephone Selling in the 1980s by Martin Shafiroff and Robert L. Shook (Harper & Row Publishers, Inc., 1982) ISBN 0-06-014952-3
- How To Make Big Money Selling, by Joe Gandolfo and Robert L. Shook (Harper & Row Publishers, Inc., 1984) ISBN 0-06-015324-5
- How to Close Every Sale, by Joe Girard with Robert L. Shook (Warner Books, paperback 1989) ISBN 0-446-38929-3
- The Entrepreneurs by Robert L. Shook (Harper & Row Publishers, Inc., 1980) ISBN 0-06-014025-9
- The Real Estate People by Robert L. Shook (Harper & Row Publishers, Inc., 1980) ISBN 0-06-014038-0
- The chief executive officers by Robert L. Shook (Harper & Row Publishers, Inc., 1981) ISBN 0-06-014897-7
- Why Didn't I Think of That by Robert L. Shook (The New American Library, Inc., 1982) ISBN 0-453-00419-9
- The IBM Way by Francis G. "Buck" Rodgers with Robert L. Shook (Harper & Row Publishers, Inc., 1986) ISBN 0-06-015522-1
- Honda: An American Success Story by Robert L. Shook (Prentice Hall Press, 1988) ISBN 0-13-394610-X
- Longaberger: An American Success Story by Dave Longaberger with Robert L. Shook (HarperCollins Publishers, Inc., 2001) ISBN 0-06-662105-4
- The Shaklee Story by Robert L. Shook, (Harper & Row Publishers, Inc. 1982) ISBN 0-06-015005-X
- The Business of America is Business by Robert L. Shook & Carrie Coolidge, (Phaedon Press Limited) ISBN 978-1-83866-413-8
- Doing Business by the Good Book: 52 Lessons on Success Straight from the Bible, (Hachette Books, 2012) ISBN 978-1-4013-4294-4
