= David Steward =

American businessman (born 1951)

- Born: David Lloyd Steward; July 2, 1951 (age 75); Chicago, Illinois, U.S.
- Education: Central Missouri State University (BS)
- Known for: Chairman and founder of World Wide Technology
- Spouse: Thelma
- Children: 2, including Kimberly

David Lloyd Steward (born July 2, 1951) is an American billionaire businessperson. Globally, he is the 213th richest and the second-richest African American, after Alex Karp, with a fortune exceeding $10B as of 2025. He is chairman and founder of World Wide Technology, one of the largest African-American-owned businesses in America.

== Early life ==
Steward was born in 1951 in Chicago, Illinois, the son of Dorothy Elizabeth Massingale, a homemaker, and Harold Lloyd Steward, a mechanic. In 1953, the family moved to Clinton, Missouri. As a child growing up in Clinton, Steward faced poverty and discrimination.

"I vividly remember segregation—separate schools, sitting in the balcony at the movie theater, being barred from the public swimming pool," notes Steward, who was among a small group of African-American high-school students who integrated the public swimming pool in Clinton in 1967.

Steward received his Bachelor of Science in business from Central Missouri State University in 1973.

== Business career ==
After graduating from college, Steward worked at Wagner Electric as a production manager (1974–1975), a sales representative at Missouri Pacific Railroad (1975–1979), and a senior account executive at FedEx (1979–1984), where he was recognized as salesman of the year and inducted into the company's hall of fame in 1981. He owned Transportation Business Specialists and Transport Administrative Services in the years leading up to founding World Wide Technology. He is also a founder of Telcobuy, a global technology and supply chain management company.

=== World Wide Technology ===
In 1990, Steward founded World Wide Technology, a systems integrator. In 1993, WWT concentrated its focus on the implementation of enterprise wide imaging, conversion services, and telecommunication networks.

In 1999 WWT spun off its telecommunications division to form Telcobuy.com. Sales for the two companies continued to grow, although revenues slipped in 2002 as WWT felt the impact of the technology recession. In 2003 combined reported revenues passed $1 billion, and Steward formed World Wide Technology Holding Company as the parent company for the two firms.

WWT's 2018 revenue was estimated to be greater than $11 billion, which would've ranked it as one of St. Louis's largest private companies.

== Civic and community involvement ==
Steward has been on committees and boards that include: Civic Progress of St. Louis; the St. Louis Regional Chamber and Growth Association; Missouri Technology Corporation, appointed by the Governor of Missouri; Webster University; BJC Health System; First Banks, Inc.; Saint Louis Science Center; United Way of Greater St. Louis; The Greater St. Louis Area Council of Boy Scouts of America and Harris–Stowe State University African-American Business Leadership Council. In 2011, Steward was appointed to the board of curators, University of Missouri by Governor Jay Nixon, although he resigned before his term was through.

== Philanthropy ==
Steward and his wife, Thelma Steward, established the Steward Family Foundation, which supports initiatives in education, health, and human services, with a focus on underrepresented communities and faith-based organizations. Through the foundation and personal giving, the Stewards have contributed millions of dollars to regional and national organizations, including the United Way of Greater St. Louis, Variety the Children's Charity of St. Louis, and numerous educational and cultural programs.

Steward has served on the boards of several civic and educational institutions, including Washington University in St. Louis, the Missouri Botanical Garden, and the Horatio Alger Association. He has also supported STEM education initiatives aimed at increasing access for minority and low-income students, and his foundation has sponsored workforce development programs throughout the Midwest.

== Political activities ==
In 2019, while Steward served on the Washington University in St. Louis board of trustees, he supported a measure in Missouri General Assembly that would affect Title IX investigations at universities. The measure was initiated by a lobbyist, employed by Steward at the time, whose son was expelled from Washington University following a Title IX violation.

Steward was finance chair of the Trust In The Mission PAC, a super PAC supporting Senator Tim Scott's Republican 2024 Presidential Campaign. In 2024, Steward donated about $230,000 to PACs supporting Republican candidates, including Mike Parson and Mike Kehoe.

== Publications ==
- Doing Business by the Good Book (with Robert L. Shook)

== Recognition ==
- 100 Leaders for the Millennium, St. Louis Business Journal, 2000
- 100+ Most Influential Black Americans - Ebony magazine
- 14th Best American Entrepreneur, Success Magazine, 1998
- Business Person of the Year for Missouri, Small Business Administration
- Company of the Year, Black Enterprise, 1999
- Entrepreneur of the Year, Black Enterprise, 2000
- Ernst & Young Entrepreneur of the Year, 1998
- Five time winner, Fast 50 Awards
- Granville T. Woods Award for Outstanding CEO, 1997
- Minority Small Business Person of the Year, Small Business Administration, 1997, 1998
- Phoenix Award, St. Louis Minority Business Council, 2000
- Small Business Association Hall of Fame, 2001
- The American Marketing Association 1996 Distinguished Executive
- Top 100 Industrial/Service Companies, Black Enterprise, 11th in 1998, 6th in 1999, 1st in 2000 and 2001
- Top 100 List of St. Louis Leaders, 2002
- Top Minority Entrepreneur, Small Business Administration, 1998
- Black Engineer of the Year, BEYA STEM Conference, 2012
- Horatio Alger Award, Horatio Alger Association of Distinguished Americans, 2014
- Silver Buffalo Award, Boy Scouts of America
