= Herriot Tabuteau =

Haitian-American physician (born 1968)

- Born: 1968 (age 57–58); Haiti
- Citizenship: United States
- Education: Bachelor of Arts, Wesleyan; Medical Doctor, Yale School of Medicine
- Occupation: Founder of Axsome Therapeutics
- Website: herriottabuteau.org

Herriot Tabuteau is a Haitian-American physician, businessman and entrepreneur. He founded Axsome Therapeutics Nasdaq: AXSM in 2012.

== Biography ==
Tabuteau immigrated from Haiti when he was nine years old. Herriot grew up on the Upper East Side of Manhattan He received his medical degree from Yale University School of Medicine and his bachelor's degree in molecular biology and biochemistry from Wesleyan University.

Tabuteau worked in healthcare finance prior to founding Axsome. He was a partner at hedge fund Healthco/S.A.C. Capital.

He took Axsome public in 2015. His 22% stake and options were worth $465 million in 2021 according to Business Insider. As of 2025, he owns 15%.

He is listed as the inventor on over 200 patents.
