= Speedrun (disambiguation) =

A speedrun is a play-through of a video game (or a selected part of it) performed with the intent of completing it as fast as possible.

Speedrun or Speed Run or Speedrunner may also refer to:

- Tool-assisted speedrun, a speedrun performed using special tools
- Speed Run (video game), a 1988 video game
- Mos Speedrun, a 2011 video game
- SpeedRunners, a 2016 video game
- MDV 1200-class fast ferry vessels (includes a list of HSC Speedrunner vessels)
- Scientology speedrunning, a series of pranks on social media
- Wikiracing, commonly referred to as Wikipedia Speedrunning
- Running
