= Sandy Bentley =

American model and twin

Sandy Bentley (born May 18, 1978 in Joliet, Illinois) now Sandra Kaufman from Westlake Village, CA is notable both individually and with her sister Amanda (Mandy) Bentley as the Bentley Twins. The 5 foot 9 inch tall twins were featured on the May 2000 cover of Playboy and were well known as Hugh Hefner's live-in lovers at the Playboy Mansion during 1999 and 2000.

The sisters were featured on the October 3, 2005 episode of Two and a Half Men, the September 17, 2000 episode of Sex and the City, and the April 24, 2000 episode of The Daily Show with Jon Stewart.

== The Mark Yagalla episode ==
During her relationship with Hefner, Sandy became involved with financier Mark Yagalla, who lavished her with expensive gifts, including jewels. After Yagalla was arrested for conducting a Ponzi scam, a USA federal receiver was appointed to recover assets which Yagalla had embezzled from the clients of his $40 million Asbury Capital Fund. Sandy was ordered to return the gifts he had given her, including nearly one million dollars in jewelry.

Sandy and her new boyfriend, nightclub doorman Michael Tardio, collaborated to sell some of the jewelry. Tardio made arrangements to meet a potential buyer on the evening of September 2, 2002; however, Tardio and his accomplice Christopher Monson were found later that night, riddled with bullets in a burning Mercedes SUV, parked in Studio City, California. The jewelry was never recovered. Sandy signed an affidavit stating she didn't have any more jewelry to avoid prosecution from the police. But several people have witnessed her wearing the jewelry on multiple occasions.

In 2003, Yagalla pleaded guilty to securities fraud, and was sentenced to five years and five months at Pensacola Federal Prison. The government recovered $1.3 million from an auction of his assets.

In February 2011, the crime was featured in the CBS documentary series 48 Hours Mystery and a $75,000 reward was offered by the City Council of Studio City, California, to help solve the crime. Many of those involved in the events were patrons of Garden of Eden nightclub, where Tardio was a doorman.

== Bibliography ==
- New York Daily News, Nancy Dillon, 2/19/2011
- Millions of Dollars in Hot Jewelry Leads to Murder, CBS News, Greg Fisher, 2/19/2011
- A Playmate, a Ponzi scheme, Jewels and Murder, CBS News, Chris O'Connell, Ira Sutow and Greg Fisher, 2/19/2011
- Fund Manager, 23 Years Old, Is Arrested on Fraud Charges, Seth Schiesel, New York Times, 10/18/2000
- Reward Offered For Info In 2002 Double Murder, CBS Los Angeles, 2/18/2011
- Police seek help solving 2002 LA double killing, Thomas Watkins, Washington, Times, 2/18/2011
- A Camera-Ready Life, Gina Piccalo and Louise Roug, Los Angeles Times, 12/12/2001
- Hedge Fund Has-Beens Amanda Cantrell, CNN/Money, 7/11/2005
- City Council offers $75,000 reward in Studio City murder case, C.J. Lin, Daily News Los Angeles, 2/18/2011
- Carpet Burns and a Bite Mark TV Guide
- Police Revisit 2002 Homicide Case Richard Fausset and Andrew Blankstein, Los Angeles Times, 12/19/2003
- The Playboy After Dark, Sharon Waxman, Washington Post, 10/10/1999
