= Arthur Rolland Kelly =

American architect (1878–1959)

- Born: July 4, 1878; Ohio, US
- Died: March 25, 1959 (aged 80); Los Angeles County, California, US
- Occupation: Architect
- Spouse: Enid Harrod Kelly
- Buildings: Christie Hotel; Playboy Mansion

Arthur Rolland Kelly (1878–1959) was an American architect who designed approximately five hundred homes and buildings, mostly in the Los Angeles area.

== Early life ==
Arthur Rolland Kelly was born in Ohio to Irish parents who emigrated from Dublin sometime around 1876.

Kelly studied architecture at the University of Illinois Urbana-Champaign under Nathan Clifford Ricker, and graduated in 1902. He settled in Los Angeles later that year, after a three-month tour of Europe.

== Career ==
One of Kelly's first jobs was at the architectural firm Greene and Greene in Pasadena. Kelly opened his own firm a few years later, initially creating homes in Hollywood and its surrounding areas. The majority of his work during this time was Colonial Revival in design.

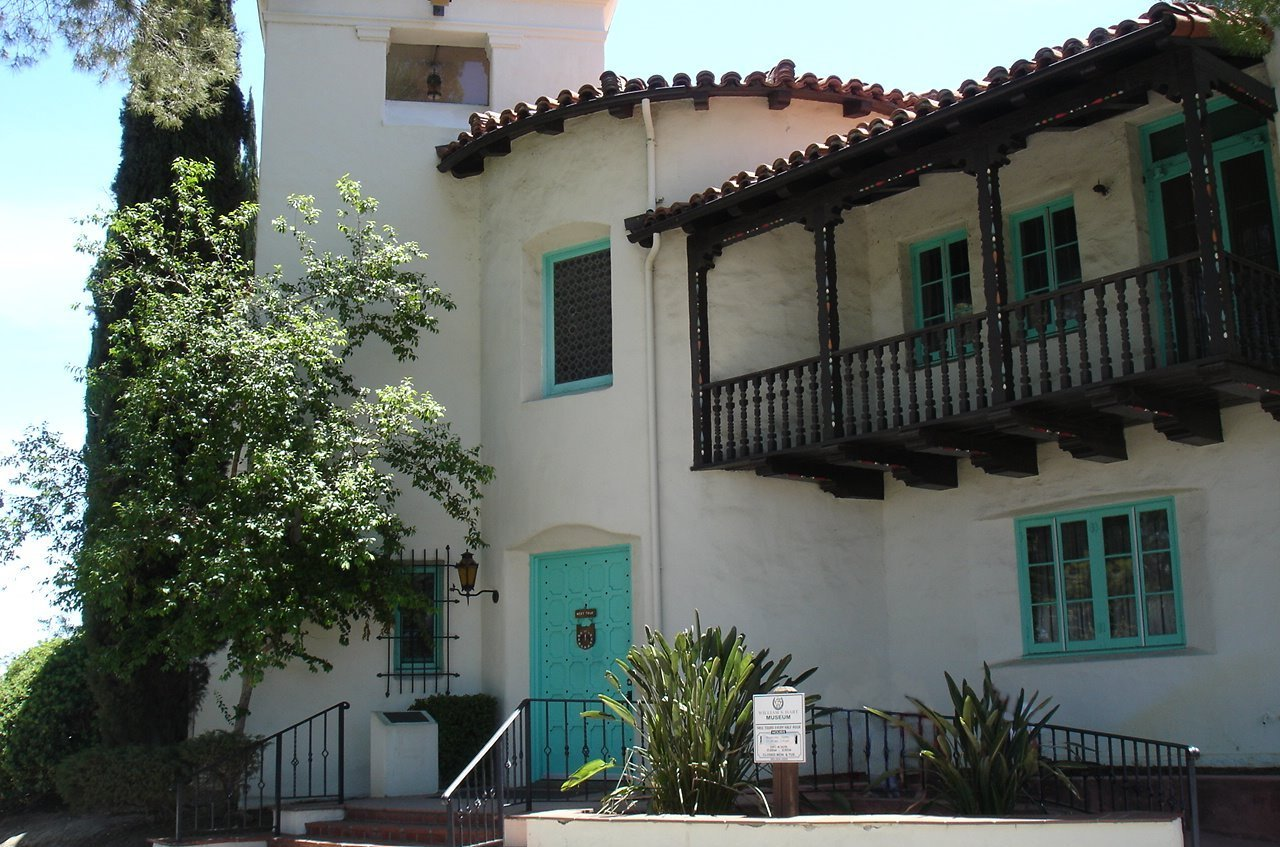
William S. Hart House

The 1920s was a very prolific period for Kelly. He specialized in Spanish Colonial Revival and Tudor Revival homes, with most of his works made for clients who had purchased lots in Holmby Hills and Beverly Hills. Kelly's most notable works during this time period include the Arthur Letts Jr. estate in Holmby Hills (now known as the Playboy Mansion); Beverly Hills estates for J. Crampton Anderson, John Blystone, Richard Dix, and Johnny Mack Brown; and the William S. Hart House in Newhall. Kelly also designed the Westlake School for Girls, Wilshire Country Club, and Christie Hotel during this time.

From the 1930s to the early 1950s, Kelly worked in association with his son Joseph Rolland Kelly.

== Personal life ==
Arthur married Enid Harrod Kelly and they had one son named Joseph.

== Death ==
Kelly died on March 25, 1959 in Los Angeles County, California.

== List of works ==
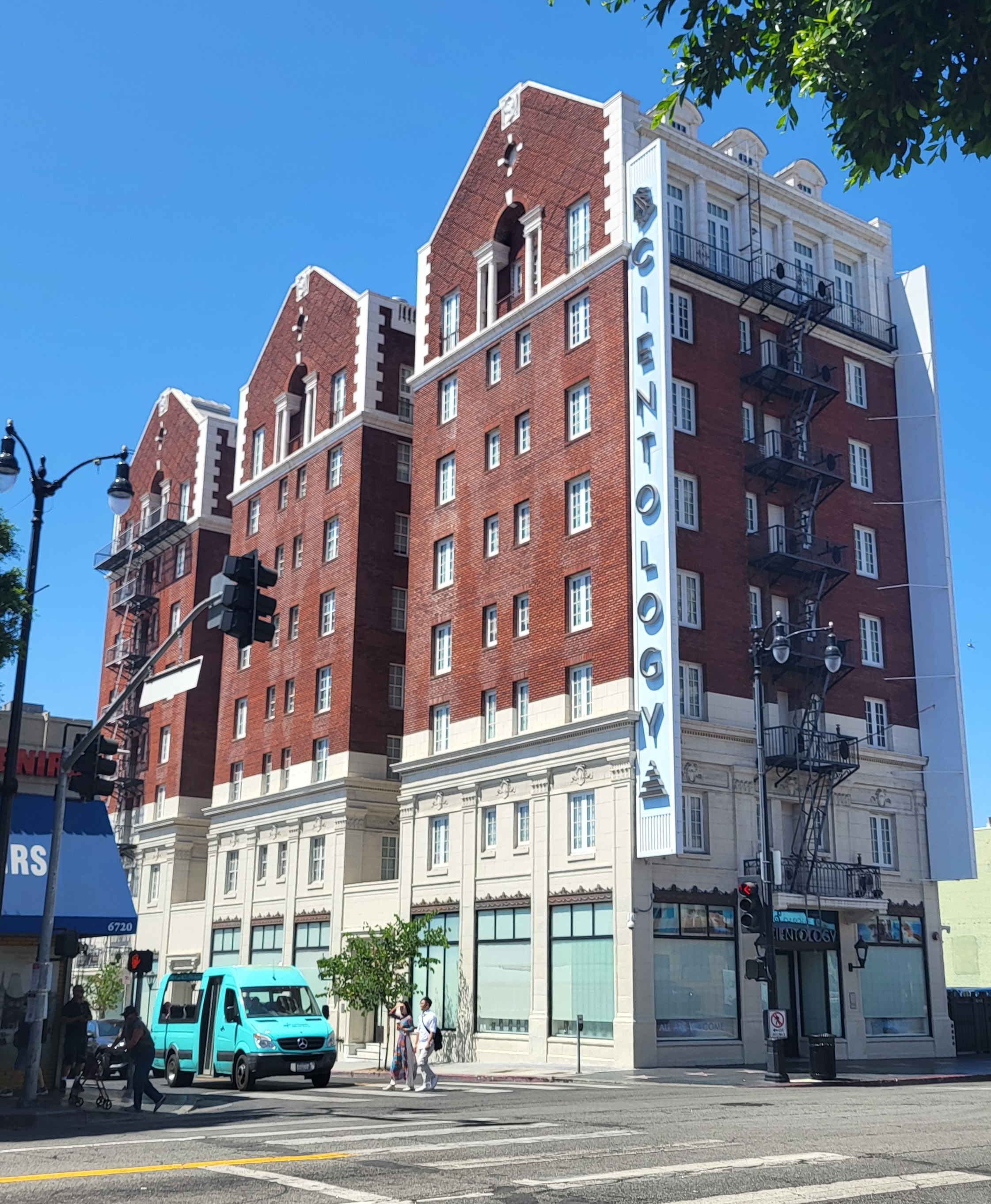
Christie Hotel

Notable Kelly works include (in Los Angeles unless otherwise noted):

- John T. Allen Ranch House (1909)
- Everest House, Monrovia (1909)
- Baltimore Hotel #2 (1909-1910)
- Frost-Tufts House (1911)
- Wilshire Country Club (1919)
- Earle C. Anthony Home (1921)
- Christie Hotel (1922), contributing property in the Hollywood Boulevard Commercial and Entertainment District
- 1920 Laughlin Park Drive (1922)
- William S Hart House, Newhall (1925)

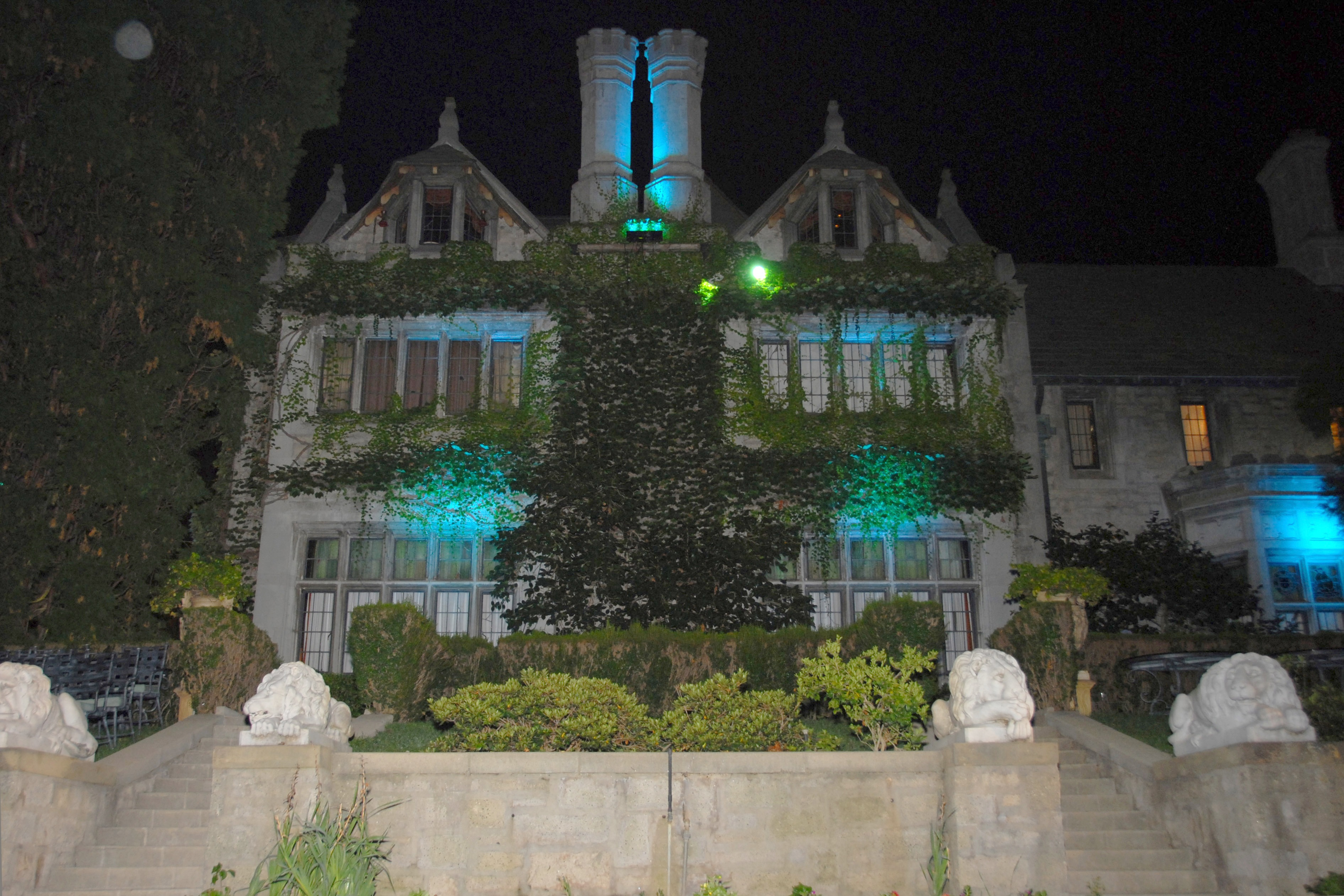
Arthur Letts Jr House

- Arthur Letts Jr House (1927)
- Westlake School for Girls (1927)
- W. B. Cline House, Beverly Hills (1930)
- E. J. Fuss House (1939)
