= List of people from Santa Clarita, California =

Santa Clarita, California
- Location within California Location within the United States
- Coordinates: 34°23′30″N 118°32′33″W
- Country: United States
- State: California
- County: Los Angeles

Santa Clarita (/ˌsæntə kləˈriːtə/; Spanish for "Little St. Clare") is a city in northwestern Los Angeles County, California, United States. It is located about 30 miles (48 km) northwest of downtown Los Angeles, and occupies 70.75 square miles (183.2 km2)[12] of land in the Santa Clarita Valley.

Two silent film superstars called what is now the city of Santa Clarita home : William S. Hart and Harry Carey. Hart has a presence throughout the city, with his former ranch house now William S. Hart Regional Park, and a high school and a school district bearing his name. At least 60 pictures feature him as director or actor. Harry Carey's former home is now Tesoro Adobe Historic Park; he appeared in over 250 films. His son Harry Carey Jr. was a well known character actor. More modern audiences will recognize Cesar Milan, celebrity dog trainer whose facility is in northern Santa Clarita; and Naya Rivera, star of Glee, whose life was tragically cut short.

Santa Clarita is a powerhouse in modern times for athletics. Indycar racer Colton Herta, and his father Bryan Herta, both hail from Santa Clarita. Shane Vereen has a super bowl ring from his time with the New England Patriots.

Santa Clarita is well known for baseball, and her high schools have produced many major league players. Three World Series champions - Kevin Millar, known for helping the Red Sox break their curse by playing in the world series, Mike Montgomery, who saved game 7 of his series for the Chicago Cubs, and Bob Walk, rookie winning pitcher in game 1 of his series. World Series participants include Tyler Glasnow, currently a pitcher for the Los Angeles Dodgers, and a 2024 all star; Trevor Bauer, an all star and Cy Young Award winner; James Shields, who played in 2008 for the Tampa Bay Rays, then in 2014 for the Kansas City Royals; Danny Worth, current coach of the Waves at Pepperdine University; and Todd Zeile, who shares with Tommy Milone the distinction of having played for 11 teams in his career.

Santa Clarita has also produced several Olympians, including Crystl Bustos, two-time gold medal winner with the softball team as a designated hitter; Alysia Montaño, track and field star with a bronze medal in 2012; Cory Snyder, part of the 1984 silver medal team for baseball; and Abbey Weitzeil, a swimmer with six Olympic medals.

== Athletes ==
Name	Image	Birth	Death	Known for	Association	Reference
Trevor Bauer		January 17, 1991		Major League Baseball pitcher	Graduate of Hart High School	
Crystl Bustos		September 8, 1977		Olympic softball player	Born and raised in Canyon Country	
Tyler Glasnow		August 23, 1993		Major League Baseball pitcher for Los Angeles Dodgers	Raised in Santa Clarita, Graduate of Hart High School	
Bryan Herta		May 23, 1970		race strategist and former race car driver.	Raised in Santa Clarita, Graduate of Hart High School	
Colton Herta		March 30, 2000		race car driver.	Raised in Santa Clarita	
Faith Jeffries		August 5, 1999		professional wrestler	Graduate of Golden Valley High School	
Kevin Millar		September 24, 1971		Major League Baseball first baseman, outfielder	Graduate of Hart High School	
Tommy Milone		February 16, 1987		Major League Baseball pitcher	Graduate of Saugus High School	
Mike Montgomery		July 1, 1989		Major League Baseball pitcher, World Series champ 2016	Graduate of Hart High School	
Alysia Montaño		April 23, 1986		runner	Graduate of Canyon High School	
Olivia Moultrie		September 17, 2005		soccer player	Born and raised in Canyon Country, California	
James Shields		December 20, 1981		Major League Baseball pitcher	Born and raised in Newhall, California	
Cory Snyder		November 11, 1962		Major League Baseball right fielder	Born and raised in Canyon Country, California	
Shane Vereen		March 2, 1989		running back	Born and raised in Valencia, California	
Bob Walk		November 26, 1956		Major League Baseball pitcher, World Series champ 1980	Raised in Newhall, Graduate of Hart High School	
Abbey Weitzeil		December 3, 1996		Olympic swimmer and medalist	Born and raised in Santa Clarita. Graduate of Saugus High School	
Danny Worth		September 30, 1985		Major League Baseball infielder and coach	Raised in Valencia, California	
Todd Zeile		September 9, 1965		Major League Baseball, 11 teams over 16 years	Graduate of Hart High School	

== Entertainment Industry ==
Name	Image	Birth	Death	Known for	Association	Reference
Harry Carey		January 16, 1878	September 21, 1947	Superstar silent film actor	Lived and farmed a ranch in Saugus, California	
Harry Carey Jr.		May 16, 1921	December 27, 2012	actor	Born and raised on his father's ranch in Saugus, California	
Mandy Gonzalez		August 22, 1978		actress, singer	Born and raised in Santa Clarita, graduate of Saugus High School	
William S. Hart		December 6, 1864	June 23, 1946	silent film actor, screenwriter, director and producer	Lived on a ranch in Newhall, California	
Taylor Lautner		February 11, 1992		actor	Attended Valencia High School	
Cesar Milan		August 27, 1969		actor, dog trainer	Located in Santa Clarita since 2009	
Kelly Packard		January 29, 1975		actress	Lived in Santa Clarita from her teens, graduate of Canyon High School	
Tyler Posey		October 18, 1991		actor, musician	Raised in Santa Clarita	
Naya Rivera		January 12, 1987	July 8, 2020	actress, singer, model	Raised in Santa Clarita	
Atticus Shaffer		June 19, 1998		actor, YouTuber	Born in Santa Clarita	

== Political ==
Name	Image	Birth	Death	Known for	Association	Reference
Mike Garcia		April 24, 1976		fighter pilot, former representative for California's 27th congressional district (Note: The 27th district was numbered as the 25th from 2013 to 2023.)	Graduate of Saugus High School (California)	
Katie Hill		August 25, 1987		former representative for California's 25th congressional district	Graduate of Saugus High School (California)	
Buck McKeon		September 9, 1938		former representative for California's 25th congressional district	mayor and council member of City of Santa Clarita	
Dee Dee Myers		September 1, 1961		White House press secretary	Graduate of Hart High School	
