= Izabella St. James =

Television personality (born 1975)

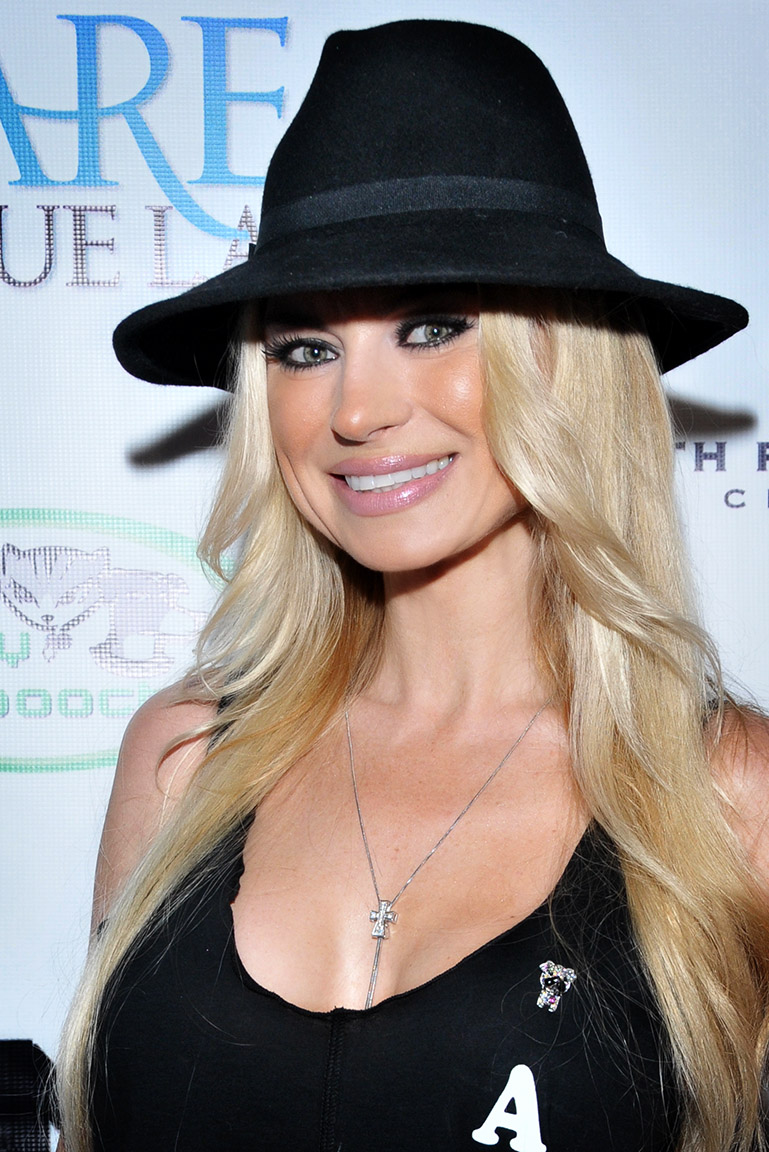
- St. James in 2015
- Born: 25 September 1975 (age 51); Kraków, Poland
- Education: McGill University (BA); Pepperdine University (JD)

Izabella St. James (born 25 September 1975) is a television personality and a former girlfriend of Hugh Hefner, editor/publisher of Playboy magazine. She is best known as the author of a memoir entitled Bunny Tales: Behind Closed Doors at the Playboy Mansion, published 2006, about activities at the Playboy Mansion in Los Angeles.

== Biography ==
Izabella St. James was born in Kraków, Poland, when that country was under Communist rule. When St. James was ten years old her parents moved to Athens, Greece, where they lived for a year. Her family then moved to British Columbia, Canada. A year later they settled further east in the province of Ontario, Canada. St. James lived in Kitchener-Waterloo for five years while she attended high school, and graduated with an award for academic excellence. After high school, she moved to Montreal, Canada, to attend McGill University. She started with a double major in political science and history, but switched to a humanistic studies major, and studied art history, classical music, literature and Spanish.

She then attended Pepperdine University School of Law in Malibu, California. She finished law school in December 2001, earning her Juris Doctor degree by graduating a semester early, having completed study abroad programs at Universidad Complutense, Madrid, Spain, and at the Jagiellonian University in her native Poland. However, she did not complete the bar examination the following February.

In September 2000, she met Hugh Hefner and his girlfriends in a Los Angeles nightclub, and began attending parties at the Playboy Mansion. In January 2002, after finishing law school, St. James became part of Hefner's girlfriend posse, spending nights out and traveling regularly with him and his girlfriends. In April 2002, Hefner invited her to move into the Playboy Mansion and become one of his "official girlfriends". St. James lived at the Mansion for two years, moving out and ending her relationship with Hefner in May 2004.

Since leaving the Playboy Mansion, St. James has been acting and writing. In August 2006, she published Bunny Tales: Behind Closed Doors at the Playboy Mansion, a memoir of her time as one of Hugh Hefner's girlfriends.

In 2015, she starred in the first season of the Polish reality TV series called Żony Hollywood ("Hollywood Wives") which is based on The Real Housewives franchise.

She runs a rescue service for pugs and is known on social media as "The Pug Queen".

== Books ==
- Bunny Tales: Behind Closed Doors at the Playboy Mansion (2006), Running Press

== Selected filmography ==
=== Film ===
- The Goods: The Don Ready Story (2009)
- Ninja Cheerleaders (2007)
- Thunder Over Reno (2007) – Paige Raider

=== Television ===
- Bernie Mac
- VH1 Fabulous Life of Hugh Hefner
- MTV Cribs Playboy Mansion
- The Surreal Life – Season One, The Wedding and Goodbye
- Playboy's 50th Anniversary Celebration on A&E
- Sharon Osbourne Show
