= Hugh M. Hefner Moving Image Archive =

University of Southern California archive

The Hugh M. Hefner Moving Image Archive
- Location: Norris Theater at the University of Southern California Los Angeles, California
- Type: Audiovisual Archive
- Founder: Herbert E. Farmer
- Director: Dino Everett
- Website: hmharchive.com

The Hugh M. Hefner Moving Image Archive, also known as the HMH Foundation Moving Image Archive, is an audiovisual archive located on the campus of University of Southern California Los Angeles, California. Founded as Audio-Visual Services (A-V Services) by Herbert E. Farmer, a former student, the archive was once an important distributor and producer of educational films. In 2007, the archive received a donation from Hugh Hefner and was renamed in his honor.

In October 2014, archive director Dino Everett premiered the anthology film "Shock Value The Movie: How Dan O'Bannon and Some USC Outsiders Helped Invent Modern Horror" at USC Norris Cinema Theatre, with a panel featuring Alec Lorimore, Terence Winkless, Diane O'Bannon, Mary Burkin, and New York Times reporter Jason Zinoman, who penned the book Shock Value that inspired the anthology. Everett plans to raise the funds to properly preserve each film in the anthology, which includes films by former USC alumni John Carpenter and Dan O'Bannon.

== Collections ==
1. Student Films and The Trojan Newsreel
2. University Film and Video Association Collection
3. Silent Film Collection
4. Motion Picture History Booklist
5. Herbert E. Farmer Technology Collection
6. The Fred Engelberg Collection
7. Helen Miller Bailey Travel Film Collection
