= Christie Hotel =

Building in Los Angeles, California, U.S.

- U.S. Historic district – Contributing property
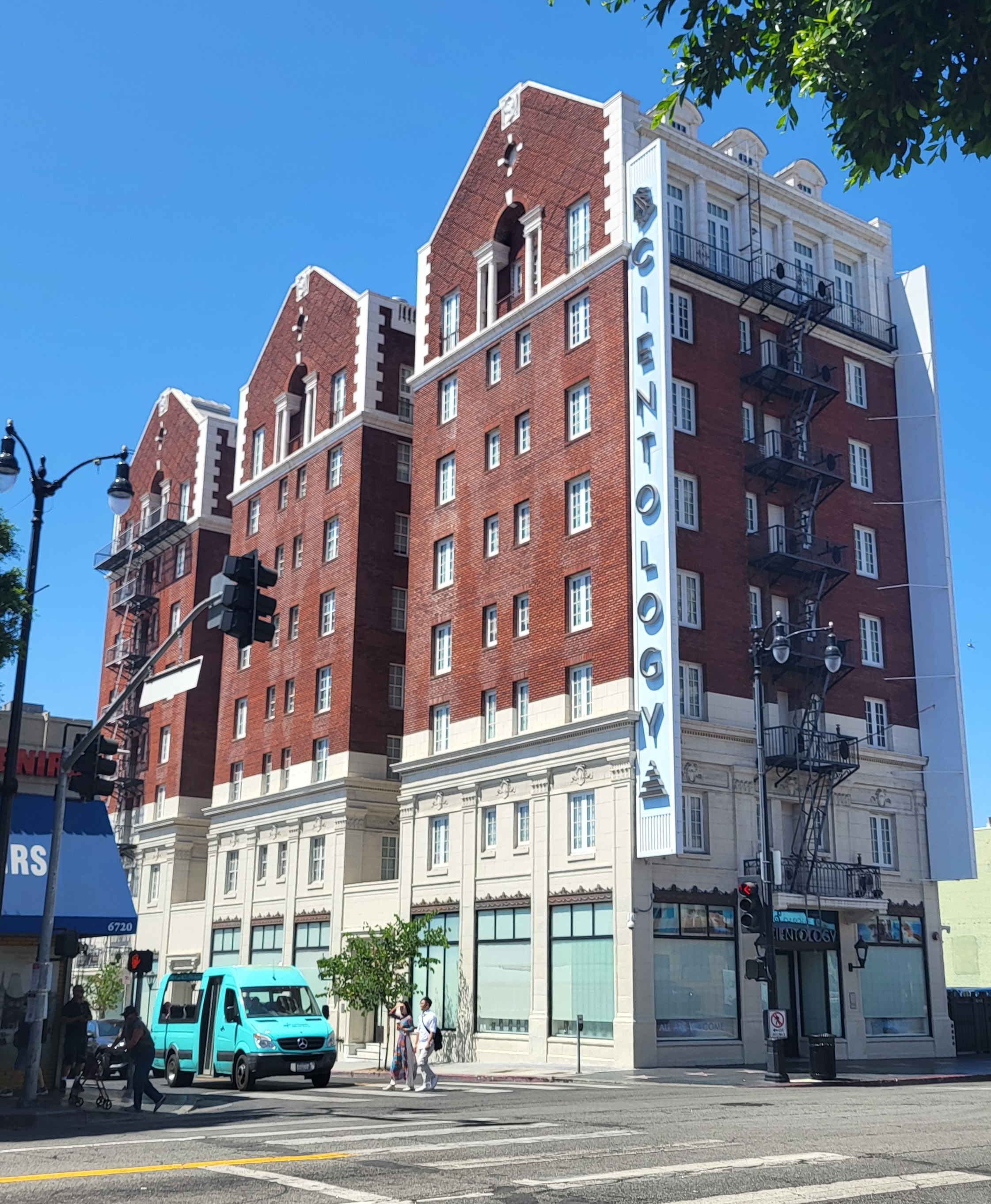
- The building in 2024

- Location within the Los Angeles metropolitan area
- Location: 6724 W. Hollywood Blvd., Hollywood, California
- Coordinates: 34.101°N 118.337°W
- Built: 1922
- Architect: Arthur Rolland Kelly
- Architectural style: Georgian Revival
- Part of: Hollywood Boulevard Commercial and Entertainment District (ID85000704)
- Designated CP: April 4, 1985

Christie Hotel, formerly The Hollywood Inn and The Drake, also known as the Church of Scientology Information Center, is a historic eight-story building at 6724 W. Hollywood Blvd. in Hollywood, California. Considered Hollywood's first skyscraper and also its first luxury hotel, the building features Georgian Revival architecture and has been described as "an excellent example of its style" by the United States Department of the Interior.

== History ==
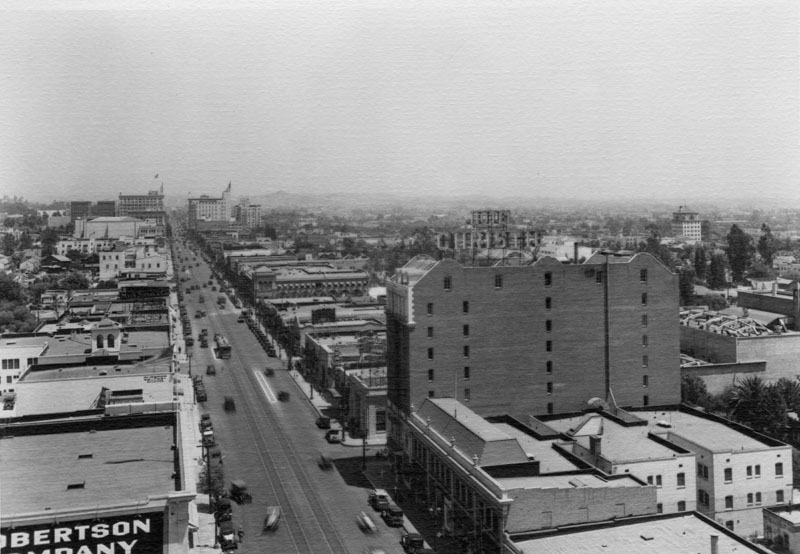
Christie Hotel on Hollywood Boulevard, 1928

Built in 1922, the Christie Hotel was designed by Arthur Rolland Kelly and owned by the Christie brothers, two of early Hollywood's most powerful movie moguls who also owned the nearby Christie Realty Building. The building, considered Hollywood's first skyscraper and also its first luxury hotel, was state-of-the-art for its time period, and consisted of 100 guestrooms, each with steam heat and an individual bathroom.

In 1933, due to the effects of the Stock Market Crash of 1929 and the ensuing Great Depression, the Christie brothers's companies were forced to file for bankruptcy. Assets, including this hotel, were sold away. Between 1933 and 1974, the hotel exchanged hands several times, at one point operating as The Drake and another point The Hollywood Inn. In 1974, the Church of Scientology purchased the building for $1.25 million ($8.16 million in 2025) and remodeled it into their information center, with apartments on the upper floors.

In 1985, the Hollywood Boulevard Commercial and Entertainment District was added to the National Register of Historic Places, with Christie Hotel listed as a contributing property in the district. In 2026, Christie Hotel and several nearby Scientology facilities were subject to Scientology speedrunning.

== Architecture and design ==
Christie Hotel is made of brick and features Georgian Revival architecture, with classical proportion and detailing evident in the massing and decorations. The building is divided into three towers, each of which has a dormer with rounded pediments that project above the roofline. The United States Department of the Interior considers the building "an excellent example of its style."

== See also ==
- List of contributing properties in the Hollywood Boulevard Commercial and Entertainment District
