= Hugh Hefner =

American magazine publisher (1926–2017)

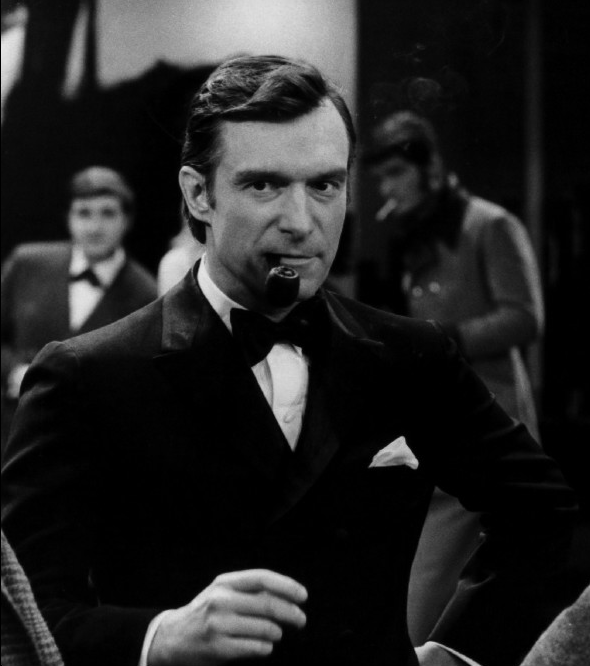
- Hefner in 1970
- Born: Hugh Marston Hefner; April 9, 1926; Chicago, Illinois, U.S.
- Died: September 27, 2017 (aged 91); Los Angeles, California, U.S.
- Resting place: Westwood Village Memorial Park Cemetery
- Other name: Hef
- Education: University of Illinois, Urbana-Champaign (BA); Northwestern University (attended)
- Years active: 1953–2017
- Title: Editor-in-Chief of Playboy; Chief Creative Officer of Playboy Enterprises
- Spouses: Mildred Williams (m. 1949; div. 1959); Kimberley Conrad (m. 1989; sep. 1998; div. 2010); Crystal Harris (m. 2012)
- Partners: See list: Barbi Benton (1969–1976); Sondra Theodore (1976–1981); Carrie Leigh (1983–1988); Brande Roderick (1999–2000); Holly Madison (2001–2008); Bridget Marquardt (2002–2009); Izabella St. James (2002–2004); Kendra Wilkinson (2004–2008)
- Children: 4, including Christie and Cooper
- Military service
- Branch: United States Army
- Service years: 1944–1946
- Rank: Private first class
- Conflicts: World War II

Hugh Marston Hefner (April 9, 1926 – September 27, 2017) was an American magazine publisher and businessman. He was the founder and editor-in-chief of Playboy magazine, a publication with sexualized photographs of women, articles, and fiction, and lengthy interviews with politicians, musicians, artists, and writers. Hefner extended the Playboy brand into a world network of Playboy Clubs. He also resided in luxury mansions where Playboy Playmates shared his partying lifestyle, fueling media interest.

== Early life and education ==
Hefner was born on April 9, 1926, in Chicago, the first child of accountant Glenn Lucius Hefner (1896–1976) and his wife Grace Caroline (Swanson) Hefner (1895–1997) who worked as a teacher. His parents were from Nebraska. He had a younger brother named Keith (1929–2016). His mother was of Swedish ancestry, and his father was German and English.

Hefner was a descendant of Plymouth governor William Bradford through his father's line. He described his family as "conservative, Midwestern, Methodist.” His mother had wanted him to become a missionary.

Hefner attended Sayre Elementary School and Steinmetz High School, then served from 1944 to 1946 as a United States Army writer for a military newspaper. He graduated from the University of Illinois Urbana-Champaign in 1949 with a Bachelor of Arts in psychology and a double minor in creative writing and art, having earned his degree in two and a half years. In the spring of 1950, he took a semester of graduate courses in sociology at Northwestern University, but he dropped out soon after.

== Career ==
In January 1952, Hefner left his job as a copywriter for Esquire after he was denied a $5 raise. In 1953, he took out a mortgage loan of $600 and raised $8,000 from 45 investors (including $1,000 from his mother—"not because she believed in the venture," he told E! in 2006, "but because she believed in her son") to launch Playboy, which was initially going to be called Stag Party. The first issue was published in December 1953 and featured Marilyn Monroe from a 1949 nude calendar shoot she did under a pseudonym. That first issue sold more than 50,000 copies, but Monroe was not paid by Playboy or Hefner for the photos. (Hefner never met Monroe, but he bought the crypt next to hers at the Westwood Village Memorial Park Cemetery in 1992 for $75,000.)

Esquire magazine rejected Charles Beaumont's science fiction story "The Crooked Man" in 1955, so Hefner agreed to publish it in Playboy. The story highlighted straight men being persecuted in a world where homosexuality was the norm. The magazine received angry letters, so Hefner responded, "If it was wrong to persecute heterosexuals in a homosexual society then the reverse was wrong, too." In 1961, Hefner watched Dick Gregory perform at the Herman Roberts Show Bar in Chicago, and he hired Gregory to work at the Chicago Playboy Club. Gregory attributed the launch of his career to that night.

Hefner promoted a bon vivant lifestyle in his magazine and in the television shows that he hosted, Playboy's Penthouse (1959–1960) and Playboy After Dark (1969–1970). He was also the chief creative officer of Playboy Enterprises, the publishing group which operates the magazine.

On June 4, 1963, Hefner was arrested for promoting obscene literature after he published an issue of Playboy featuring nude shots of Jayne Mansfield in bed with a man present. The case went to trial and resulted in a hung jury.

In the 1960s, Hefner created "private key" clubs that were racially diverse. During the civil rights movement in 1966, Hefner sent Alex Haley to interview American Nazi Party founder George Lincoln Rockwell, much to Rockwell's shock because Haley was black. Rockwell agreed to meet with Haley only after gaining assurance that he was not Jewish, although Rockwell kept a handgun on the table throughout the interview. In Roots: The Next Generations (1979), the interview was recreated with James Earl Jones as Haley and Marlon Brando as Rockwell. Haley had also interviewed Malcolm X in 1963 and Martin Luther King Jr. in 1966 for the newly established 1962 "playboy interview".

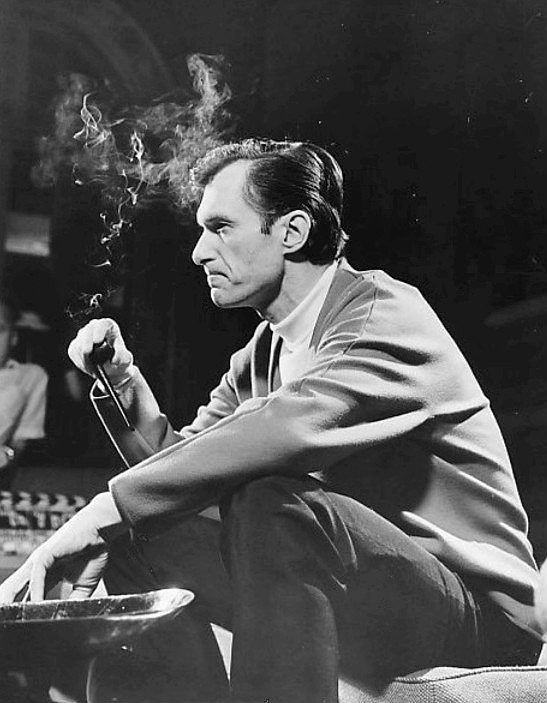
Hefner with his trademark Playboy Pipe in 1966

In 1970, Hefner stated that "militant feminists" are "unalterably opposed to the romantic boy-girl society that Playboy promotes" and ordered an article in his magazine against them.

In his later years, Hefner's star dimmed, but he remained a well-known personality, often appearing in cameo roles. In the 1993 The Simpsons episode "Krusty Gets Kancelled", Hefner voiced himself. In 1999, Hefner financed the Clara Bow documentary Discovering the It Girl. "Nobody has what Clara had," he said. "She defined an era and made her mark on the nation". Hefner guest-starred as himself in the 2000 Sex and the City episode "Sex and Another City". In 2005, he guest-starred on the HBO shows Curb Your Enthusiasm and Entourage. He guest-starred as himself in a 2006 episode of Seth Green's Robot Chicken on the late-night programming block Adult Swim. In the 2007 Family Guy episode "Airport '07", he voiced himself. He has a star on the Hollywood Walk of Fame for television and made several movie appearances as himself. In 2009, he was nominated for a Golden Raspberry Award for Worst Supporting Actor for his performance as himself in Miss March. On his official Twitter account, he joked about this nomination: "Maybe I didn't understand the character."

Brigitte Berman's documentary Hugh Hefner: Playboy, Activist and Rebel was released on July 30, 2010. He had previously granted full access to documentary filmmaker and television producer Kevin Burns for the A&E Biography special Hugh Hefner: American Playboy in 1996. Hefner and Burns later collaborated on numerous other television projects, most notably on The Girls Next Door, a reality series that ran for six seasons (2005–2009) and 90 episodes. Hefner also made a voice-only appearance as himself in the 2011 film Hop.

In 2012, Hefner announced that his youngest son Cooper would succeed him as the public face of Playboy.

== Personal life ==
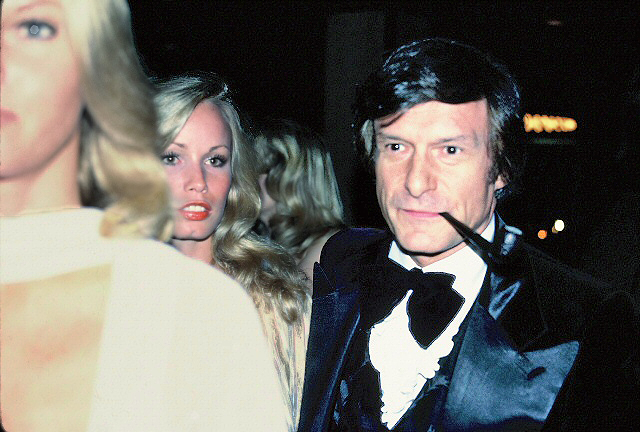
Hefner at the premiere of Sylvester Stallone's movie F.I.S.T. in 1978

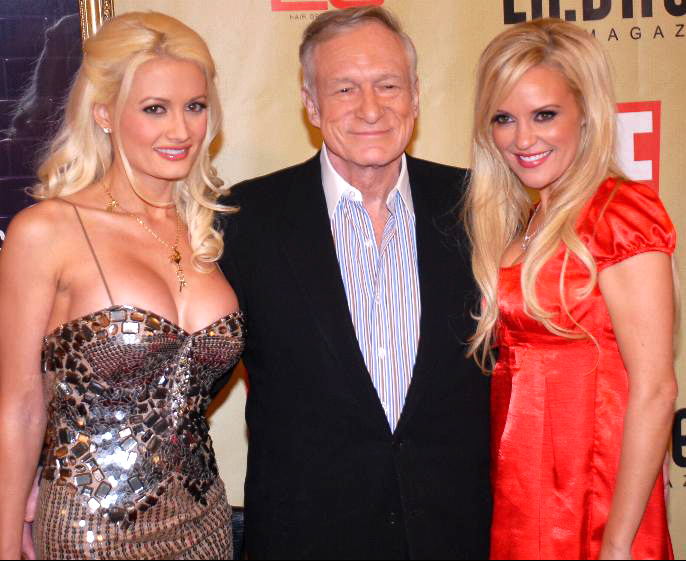
Hefner with his partners Holly Madison (left) and Bridget Marquardt in 2007

Hefner was known to friends and family simply as "Hef". He married Northwestern University student Mildred ("Millie") Williams (1926–2025) in 1949. They had a daughter named Christie (born 1952) and a son, David (born 1955). Before the wedding, Mildred confessed that she had an affair while he was away in the army. He called the admission "the most devastating moment of my life." A 2006 E! True Hollywood Story profile of Hefner revealed that Mildred allowed him to have sex with other women, out of guilt for her own infidelity and in the hope that it would preserve their marriage. The couple divorced in 1959.

Hefner remade himself as a bon vivant and man about town, a lifestyle that he promoted in his magazine and television shows. He is often known for wearing a robe as his signature look. He admitted to being "'involved' with maybe eleven out of twelve months' worth of Playmates" during some years. Donna Michelle, Marilyn Cole, Lillian Müller, Shannon Tweed, Barbi Benton, Karen Christy, Sondra Theodore, and Carrie Leigh were a few of his many lovers; Leigh filed a $35 million palimony suit against him. In 1971, he acknowledged that he experimented in bisexuality. Also in 1971, he established a second residence in Los Angeles with the acquisition of Playboy Mansion West, and moved there permanently from Chicago in 1975.

On March 7, 1985, Hefner had a minor stroke at age 58, whereupon he re-evaluated his lifestyle, making several changes. He toned down the wild, all-night parties, and his daughter Christie took over the operation of Playboy's commercial operations in 1988. The following year, he married Playmate of the Year Kimberley Conrad; they were 36 years apart in age. The couple had sons Marston Glenn (b. 1990) and Cooper (b. 1991). The E! True Hollywood Story profile noted that the Playboy Mansion had been transformed into a family-friendly homestead. He and Conrad separated in 1998, after which she moved into the house next door to the mansion. Hefner filed for divorce from Conrad in 2009 after an 11-year separation, citing irreconcilable differences. He stated that he only remained nominally married to her for the sake of their children, and their youngest child had just turned 18. The divorce was finalized in 2010.

Hefner became known for moving an ever-changing coterie of young women into the Playboy Mansion, including twins Mandy and Sandy Bentley. He dated as many as seven women concurrently. He also dated Brande Roderick, Izabella St. James, Tina Marie Jordan, Holly Madison, Bridget Marquardt, and Kendra Wilkinson. Madison, Wilkinson, and Marquardt appeared on The Girls Next Door depicting their lives at the Playboy Mansion. In October 2008, all three of them decided to leave the mansion.

In January 2009, Hefner began a relationship with Crystal Harris; she joined the Shannon Twins after his previous "number one girlfriend" Holly Madison had ended their seven-year relationship. On December 24, 2010, he became engaged to Harris, but she broke off their engagement on June 14, 2011, five days before their planned wedding. The July issue of Playboy reached store shelves and customers' homes within days of the wedding date; it featured Harris on the cover, and in a photo spread as well. The headline on the cover read "Introducing America's Princess, Mrs. Crystal Hefner". Hefner and Harris subsequently reconciled and married on December 31, 2012.

Hefner was very distantly related to the 41st and 43rd presidents of the United States, George H. W. Bush and George W. Bush, respectively. Hefner's brother Keith died at age 87 on April 8, 2016, one day before Hefner's 90th birthday.

== Playboy Mansion ==
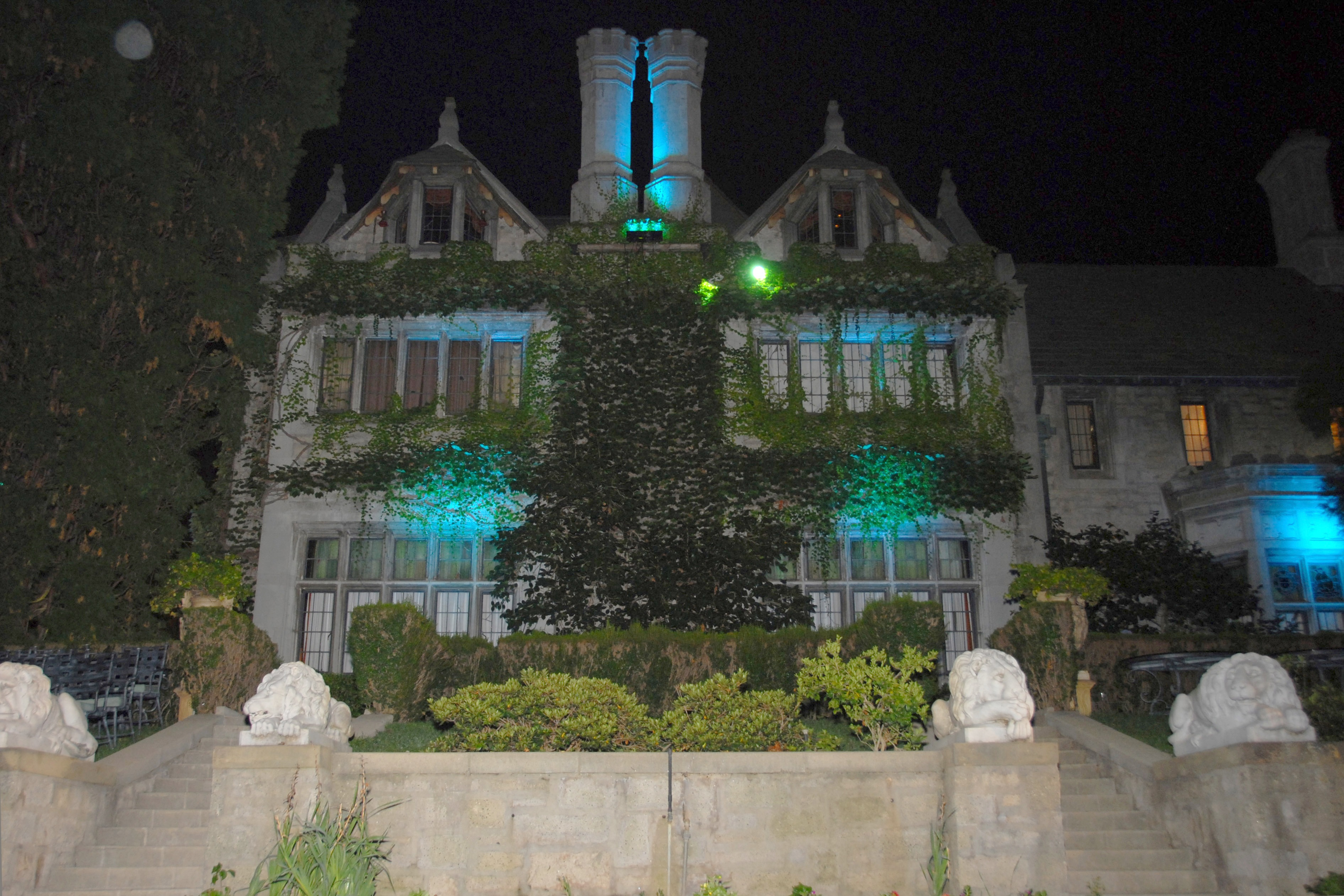
Playboy Mansion West

In January 2016, the Playboy Mansion was put on the market for $200 million, on condition that Hugh Hefner would continue to work and live in the mansion. Later that year it was sold to Daren Metropoulos, a principal at private equity firm Metropoulos & Co, for $100 million. Metropoulos planned to reconnect the Playboy Mansion property with a neighboring estate that he had purchased in 2009, combining the two for a 7.3-acre (3-hectare) compound as his own private residence.

In May 2017, Eugena Washington was the last Playmate of the Year to be announced by Hugh Hefner at the Playboy Mansion.

== Politics and philanthropy ==
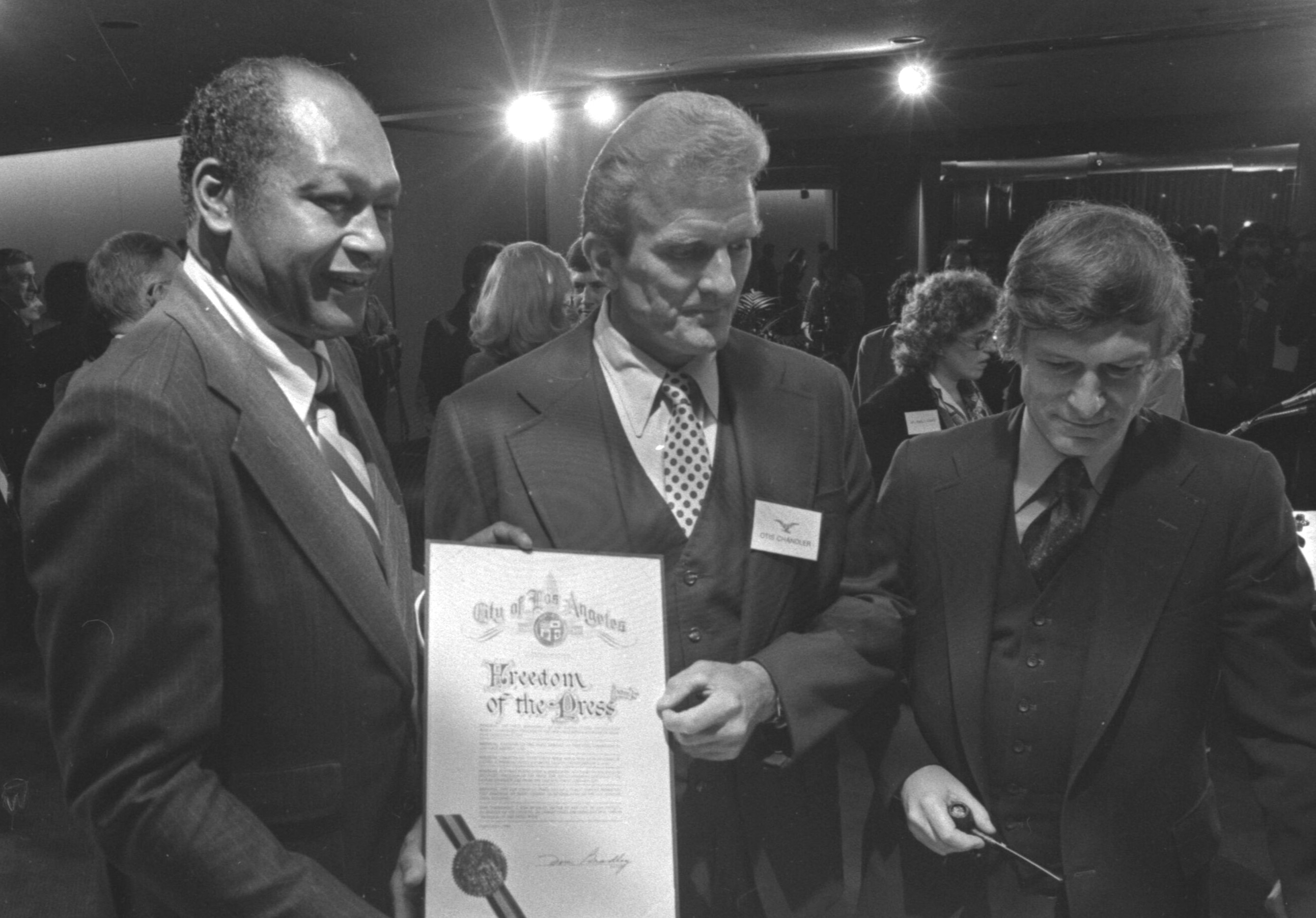
Hefner with Mayor Tom Bradley and Otis Chandler, 1980

In 1964, Hefner established the Hugh M. Hefner Foundation to "facilitate individual rights in our democratic society". The foundation funded Marty Goddard's prototype of the rape kit as part of its efforts to support women's empowerment. Additionally, the Hugh M. Hefner First Amendment Award was created by Christie Hefner "to honor individuals who have made significant contributions in the vital effort to protect and enhance First Amendment rights for Americans."

Hefner debated The Playboy Philosophy with William F. Buckley Jr., on Firing Line in Episode 26, recorded on September 12, 1966.

Hefner donated and raised money for the Democratic Party. In 2011, he referred to himself as an independent due to dissatisfaction with both the Democratic and Republican parties. Nonetheless, in 2012, he supported Barack Obama's reelection campaign.

In 1978, Hefner helped organize fund-raising efforts that led to the restoration of the Hollywood Sign. He hosted a gala fundraiser at the Playboy Mansion and contributed $27,000 (or 1/9 of the total restoration costs) by purchasing the letter Y in a ceremonial auction.

Hefner stated in a 2000 interview with Playboy, "It's perfectly clear to me that religion is a myth. It's something we have invented to explain the inexplicable." Lee Strobel, a Christian author who interviewed Hefner regarding his theological positions, later described Hefner as having a "very minimalistic, deistic view of God."

Hefner donated $100,000 to the University of Southern California's School of Cinematic Arts to create a course called "Censorship in Cinema", and $2 million to endow a chair for the study of American film. In 2007, the university's audiovisual archive at the Norris Theater received a donation from Hefner and was renamed to the Hugh M. Hefner Moving Image Archive in his honor.

Both through his charitable foundation and individually, Hefner also contributed to charities and other organizations outside the sphere of politics and publishing, throwing fundraiser events for Much Love Animal Rescue as well as Generation Rescue, an anti-vaccinationist campaign organization supported by Jenny McCarthy.

On April 26, 2010, Hefner donated the last $900,000 sought by a conservation group for a land purchase needed to stop the development of the vista of the Hollywood Sign. Sylvilagus palustris hefneri, an endangered subspecies of marsh rabbit, is named after him in honor of financial support that he provided.

On November 18, 2010, Children of the Night founder and president Lois Lee presented Hefner with the organization's first-ever Founder's Hero of the Heart Award in appreciation for his unwavering dedication, commitment and generosity.

The Barbi Twins, who are among a notable cohort of celebrity Playmates, including Pamela Anderson and Hefner's third wife Crystal Harris, praised the publishing icon for providing centerfold models and extended members of the Playboy family with a platform for activism and advocacy on behalf of animal populations in need.

Hefner supported legalizing same-sex marriage, calling it "a fight for all our rights. Without it, we will turn back the sexual revolution and return to an earlier, puritanical time."

== Death ==
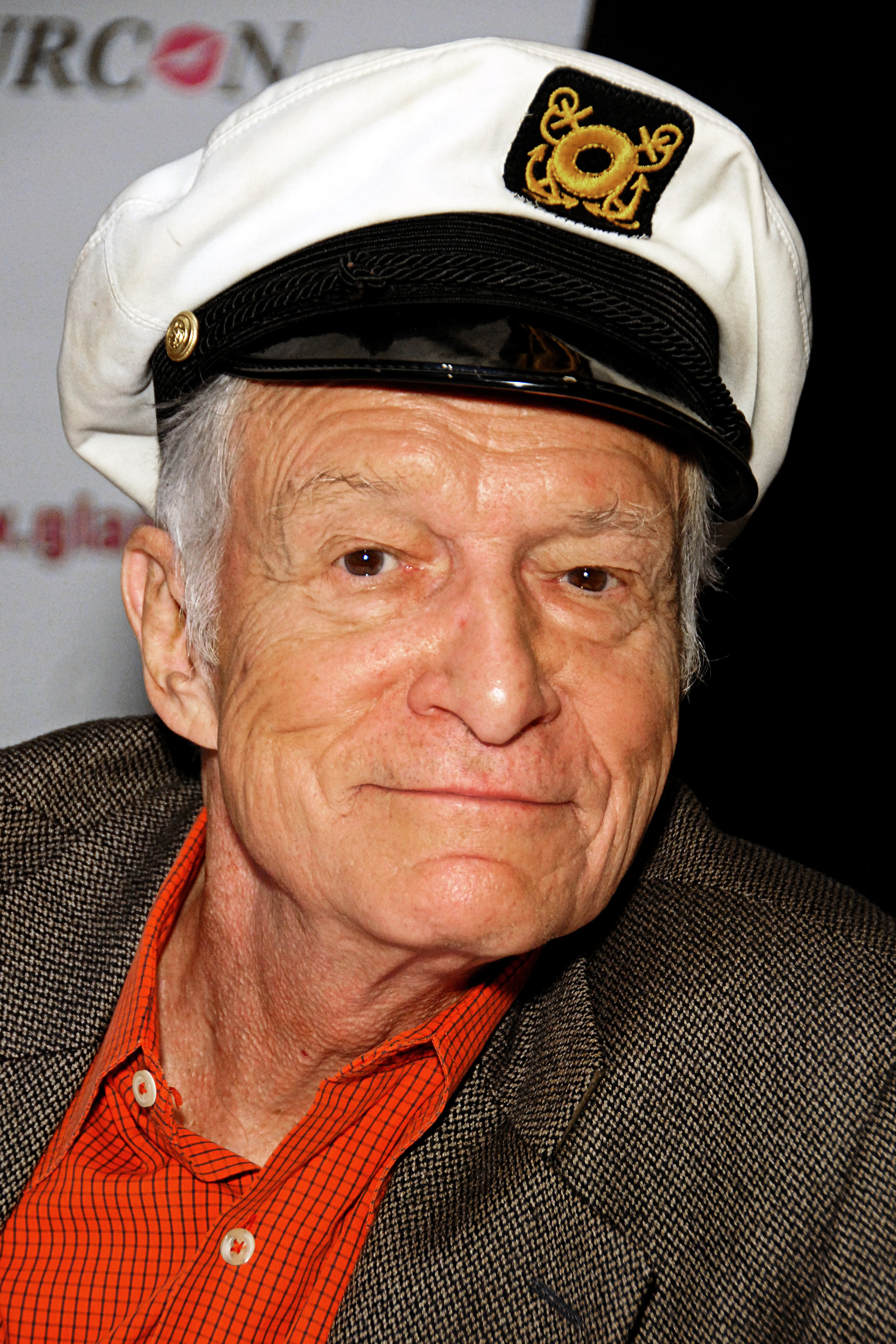
Hefner in 2010

Hefner died at the Playboy Mansion on September 27, 2017, at the age of 91. The immediate cause of death was cardiac arrest and respiratory failure, with Hefner going into sepsis brought on by an E. coli infection.

He is interred at Westwood Memorial Park in Los Angeles, in the crypt beside Marilyn Monroe, for which he paid $75,000 in 1992. "Spending eternity next to Marilyn is an opportunity too sweet to pass up," Hefner had told the Los Angeles Times in 2009.

== Criticism and accusations ==
Suzanne Moore wrote in The Guardian that Hefner threatened to file a lawsuit against her for calling him a "pimp". Defending her position, Moore argued that "he was a man who bought and sold women to other men". She further stated that "part of Hefner's business acumen was to make the selling of female flesh respectable and hip, to make soft porn acceptable." Julie Bindel argued in The Independent that Hefner "caused immeasurable damage by turning porn—and therefore the buying and selling of women's bodies—into a legitimate business."

Robin Abcarian wrote in the Los Angeles Times, quoting Wendy Hamilton, that Hefner "probably did more to mainstream the exploitation of women's bodies than any other figure in American history," adding that he "managed to convince many women that taking off their clothes for men's pleasure was not just empowering, but a worthy goal in itself." She further stated that Hefner "embodied the aesthetic notion that images of women—and women themselves—exist to please men."

Hefner's former girlfriend Holly Madison said that he "would encourage competition—and body image issues—between his multiple live-in girlfriends. His legacy is full of evidence of the exploitation of women for professional gain." Ed Stetzer wrote in Christianity Today that Hefner would have the residence systematically cleaned whenever Christie Hefner visited in order "to keep the realities from his own daughter". Stetzer further lamented the consequences of Hefner's role as a "general" of the "sexual revolution":

It's hard to fathom that anyone would have known what this would have turned into. Parents growing up today are fighting to keep their children pure. Spouses are fighting to keep their marriages intact. And many enslaved and trapped in the adult entertainment industry have been figuratively and literally stripped not only of their clothes, but their very value as people made in the image of God. If this does not concern us, what will?

A 12-part television documentary series, Secrets of Playboy, debuted on A&E January 24, 2022, in which Hefner's former male and female employees and partners made claims of systematic sexual misconduct and manipulation, recreational and manipulative drug use, peer pressure, sextortion, blackmail, rape, forced and violent anal sex, sexual assault without consent and/or while victims were in a state of drug-induced stupor or unconsciousness, spying, videotaping without consent, and the rape of minors by Hefner and his celebrity friends and guests at the Playboy Mansion and other locations. The PLBY group, now publicly owned, distanced itself from Hefner in a statement released shortly before the first episode was broadcast, saying, "Today's Playboy is not Hugh Hefner's Playboy. We trust and validate these women and their stories and we strongly support those individuals who have come forward to share their experiences."

In January 2024, Hefner's widow Crystal, who previously brushed away criticism, wrote a memoir where she alleged she experienced a hostile environment while at the Playboy Mansion, even claiming that she was "imprisoned" while there.

== Depictions ==
The Amazon original series American Playboy: The Hugh Hefner Story was released in April 2017. It stars Matt Whelan in the title role, along with Emmett Skilton and Chelsie Preston Crayford. The ten episodes are a combination of interviews, archival footage (including moments found in Hefner's vast personal collection), and cinematic re-enactments that cover the launch of the magazine as well as the next six decades of Hefner's personal life and career. The series was filmed in Auckland.

In October 2017, Playboy Enterprises announced that a Hugh Hefner biopic directed by Brett Ratner with the screenplay by Jeff Nathanson was greenlit with Jared Leto rumored to play Hefner. In November 2017, it was indefinitely put on hold following sexual harassment allegations against Ratner, and Leto's representatives stated that reports of him being attached to the film at any point were false.

A highly fictionalized version of him appears in James Ellroy's 2026 novel Red Sheet.

== Filmography ==
Film
Year	Film	Role	Notes
1981	History of the World, Part I	Ancient Roman Entrepreneur	
1982	The Comeback Trail	Himself	
1987	Beverly Hills Cop II	Himself	
2005	The Aristocrats	Himself	Archive footage
2008	The House Bunny	Himself	
2009	Miss March	Himself	
2011	Hop	Voice at Playboy Mansion	

Television
Year	Show	Role	Notes
1959–1961	Playboy's Penthouse	Himself/Host	
1969–1970	Playboy After Dark	Himself/Host	
1974	The Odd Couple	Himself	Episode: One for the Bunny
1977	Saturday Night Live	Himself/Host	
1993	The Fresh Prince of Bel-Air	Himself	Episode: Fresh Prince After Dark
1993	The Simpsons	Himself	Episode: Krusty Gets Kancelled
1993	The Larry Sanders Show	Himself	Episode: Broadcast Nudes
1996	Roseanne	Himself	Episode: What a Day for a Daydream, credited as Hugh M. Hefner
2000	The Daily Show	Himself	
2000	Sex and The City	Himself	
2003	The Bronx Bunny Show	Himself	
2005	Entourage	Himself	Episode: Aquamansion
2005	The Girls Next Door	Himself	
2005	Curb Your Enthusiasm	Himself	Episode: The Smoking Jacket
2006	The Boondocks	Himself	Episode: The Real
2006	The Late Late Show with Craig Ferguson	Himself	
2006	Robot Chicken	Himself	Episode: Drippy Pony
2007	Family Guy	Himself	Episode: Airport '07

Music Videos
Year	Title	Artist	Role	Notes
2000	"Playmate of the Year"	Zebrahead	Himself	cameo
2005	"Beverly Hills"	Weezer	Himself	

== Books ==
- Hefner, Hugh Marston (1963). The Playboy Philosophy. HMH Publishing Company.
