= Playboy's Penthouse =

American variety/talk TV series

- Genre: Variety
- Starring: Hugh Hefner
- Opening theme: "Playboy's Theme" by Cy Coleman
- Country of origin: United States
- Original language: English
- No. of seasons: 2
- No. of episodes: 44

Production
- Running time: 48 minutes

Original release
- Network: Syndication
- Release: October 24, 1959 – March 5, 1961

Playboy's Penthouse is an American variety/talk television show hosted by Playboy founder and then-editor/publisher Hugh Hefner. It was first broadcast on October 24, 1959, and ran in syndication for two seasons.

== Development ==
The show was designed as a way to spread Playboy magazine's influence beyond the printed page and to help non-readers get to know Hefner.

The show, initially recorded at ABC's Chicago station WBKB, was set up as if it were a party at Hefner's own apartment, with many Playboy Playmates and bunnies in attendance. Celebrity guests would engage in conversation with Hefner and then perform, as well. The theme was written by Cy Coleman. The first season ran slightly more than one year with a second season starting on September 9, 1961, with Jack E. Leonard, Anita O'Day, Buddy Greco, and George Wein. After the second season's planned programs were completed, Sammy Davis Jr. was booked to play a Chicago nightclub and expressed a desire to appear on the show. Hefner was unable to book additional production time at the WBKB Studios on State Street, but was able to strike a deal with CBS's WBBM-TV to reconstruct the Playboy's Penthouse set at their McClurg Court studios and tape an additional five programs there in November and December 1960, the Davis guest appearance being the first segment taped. In Chicago, the WBBM-TV tapings were shown on WBKB as part of the continuous second season run.

== Legacy ==
In 1969, Hefner launched a show in a very similar style, Playboy After Dark which was taped in Los Angeles. Episodes of Playboy's Penthouse were included in the DVD release of Playboy After Dark in 2006 and footage from the show was used on Hefner's non-scripted program, The Girls Next Door. The concept was revived in the late 1980s by Worldvision Enterprises as After Hours, but it did not last long.

The TBS television show American Dad! parodied the show in the Season 16 episode "Rabbit Ears".
