= Daren Metropoulos =

American businessman (born 1983)

- Metropoulos in 2013
- Born: James Daren Metropoulos; August 1983 (age 43)
- Education: University of Connecticut (Note: Metropoulos did not graduate, dropping out of college after his sophomore year.)
- Occupations: Businessman; investor
- Known for: Pabst Brewing Company and Hostess Brands
- Children: 1

Daren Metropoulos (born August 1983) is an American businessman and real estate investor who co-owned Pabst Brewing Company and Hostess Brands. Since 2016, he has owned the Playboy Mansion in Los Angeles.

== Early life and education ==
James Daren Metropoulos was born in August 1983 to Marianne and Dean Metropoulos, a Greek-American billionaire. He and his older brother Evan were raised in Stowe, Vermont, before moving to Greenwich, Connecticut. Metropoulos studied business at the University of Connecticut, but dropped out after his sophomore year.

== Career ==
As a teenager, Metropoulos worked for various food businesses owned by his family. From 2010 to 2014, he was the "co-CEO" of Pabst Brewing Company. With his family, he co-owned Hostess Brands until 2016. Metropoulos runs his family's investment firm, Metropoulos & Co, with his brother and father.

=== Real estate ===
In 2009, Metropoulos purchased a property in Holmby Hills, Los Angeles, for $18 million; seven years later, he purchased the neighboring property – Hugh Hefner's Playboy Mansion – for $100 million. At the time, it was Los Angeles County's largest recorded sale. After rumours surfaced that he would demolish the Playboy Mansion, Metropoulos signed an agreement with then-city councilmember Paul Koretz to restore the property to its original condition.

In June 2024, Metropoulos paid $148 million for a home in Palm Beach, Florida. In 2026, Metropoulos sold a home in Miami Beach for $22 million. He owns additional properties in Florida and Vermont, as well as in New York City, Kauaʻi, and Martha's Vineyard.

== Personal life ==
Metropoulos is married. He and his wife, Yuliya, have one son.

Metropoulos was previously in a relationship with former Playboy Playmate Dalene Kurtis. In 2009, Kurtis filed a lawsuit alleging that Metropoulos had assaulted her; the lawsuit was later dismissed.
