= Dean Metropoulos =

American billionaire businessman

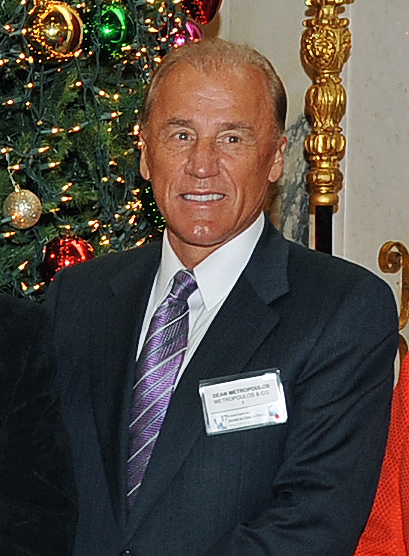
- Metropoulos in 2015
- Born: May 1946 (age 80); Tripoli, Kingdom of Greece
- Education: Babson College
- Occupations: Chairman and CEO of C. Dean Metropoulos and Company
- Known for: Hostess Brands and Pabst Brewing Company
- Children: 2, including Daren

Charles Dean Metropoulos (Greek: Ντιν Μητρόπουλος; born May 1946 in Tripoli, Greece) is a Greek-American billionaire investor and businessman. He was the owner of Pabst Brewing Company, which was founded by Jacob Best in 1844. On the Forbes 2020 list of the world's billionaires, he was ranked #875 with a net worth of US$2.6 billion.

== Early life ==
Metropoulos was ten years old when he and his parents emigrated from Greece to the U.S., settling at Watertown, Massachusetts.

Metropoulos has a bachelor's degree and an MBA from Babson College, located in Wellesley, Massachusetts.

At age 25, he went to Geneva, Switzerland, to become a financial director for GTE International's (now Verizon) European, Middle Eastern, and African operations. Later he returned to the U.S. as the company's youngest controller.

== Career ==
In 1981, Metropoulos made his first acquisition of Stella Foods Inc., a Vermont-based cheese company, which later sold to Robert Bass for $375 million.

Some of the buy-build private equity transactions of Metropoulos have included Pinnacle Foods, Ghirardelli Chocolate Company, International Home Foods, Pabst Brewing Company, The Morningstar Group, Inc. (sold to Suiza Foods which has become Dean Foods), Solar Marine ("a private, European based, international dry cargo shipping company"), Bumble Bee Foods, Vlasic Pickles, and Mumm's/Perrier-Jouët champagnes.

Metropoulos is the executive chairman and chief executive officer of C. Dean Metropoulos & Company. The company was founded in 1993 and is based in Greenwich, Connecticut. As of 2011, C. Dean Metropoulos & Co. has been involved in over 72 acquisitions with over $12 billion in invested capital. The company jointly owned Hostess Brands along with Apollo Global Management.

In September 2014 American entrepreneur Eugene Kashper, backed by TSG Consumer Partners, announced an agreement to acquire Pabst Brewing from C. Dean Metropoulos & Co for $700 million. The sale represented a gain of $550 million more than what the company paid for it in 2010. Bumble Bee Tuna is another brand owned by a company "bought and flipped" by the firm.

On July 7, 2015 there were rumors of a Hostess Brands IPO. Metropoulos stated that there was no plan for an IPO. In July 2016, a Hostess IPO was announced.

In February 2021, Nestlé SA agreed to sell most of its North American bottled-water brands, including Poland Spring, Arrowhead and Pure Life, to Metropoulos & Co and One Rock Capital Partners LLC for $4.3 billion.

== Personal life ==
Metropoulos lives in Palm Beach, Florida, with his wife Marianne, who in 2011, was President and Principal of Aegean Entertainment, a movie production company in Beverly Hills. They are parents of sons Evan and Daren. Daren purchased the Playboy Mansion for $100 million in 2016.
