= Playboy Mansion =

Former home of Playboy magazine founder Hugh Hefner

Playboy Mansion West
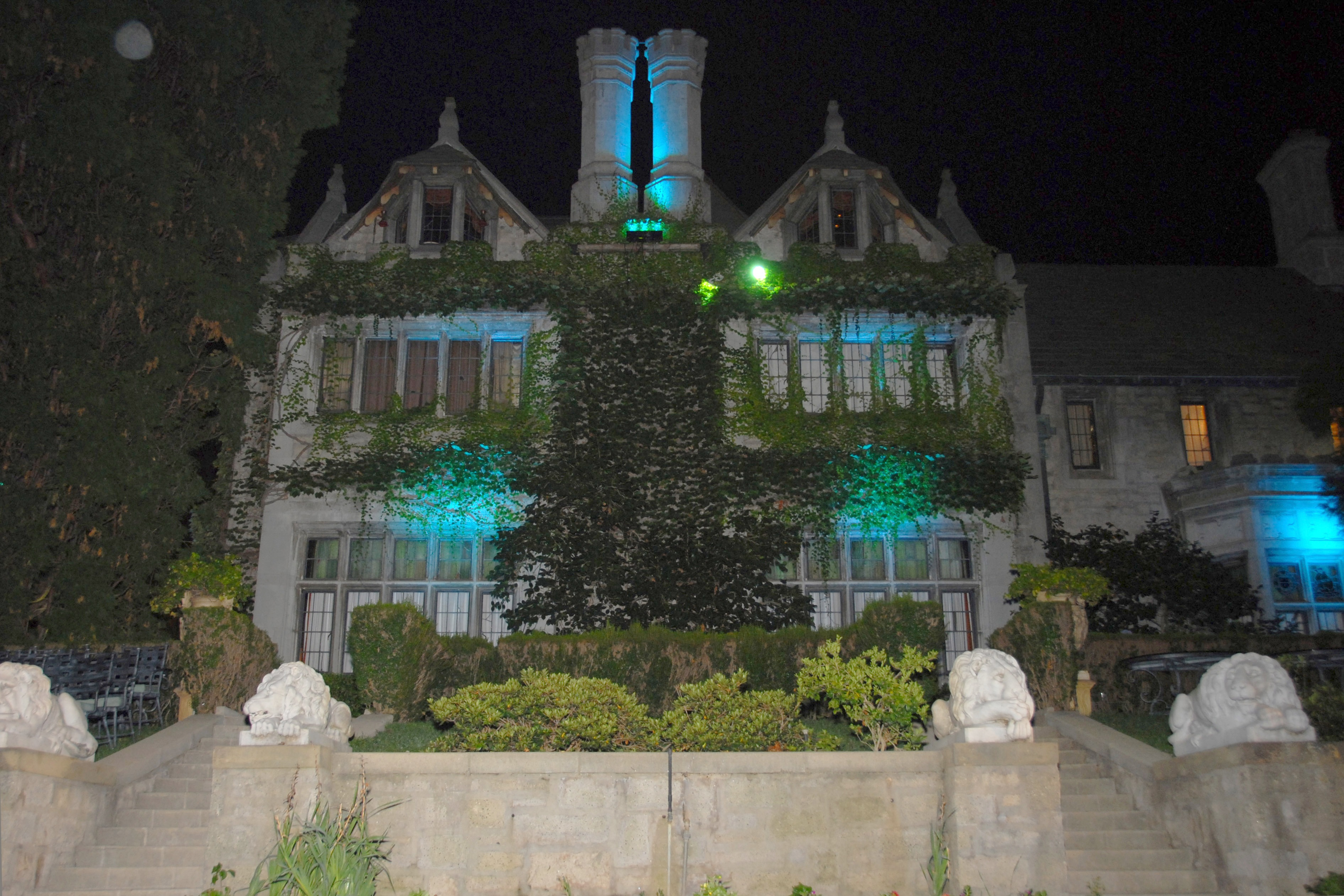

- Location within the Los Angeles metropolitan area Location within California Location within the United States

General information
- Type: House
- Architectural style: Gothic Revival; Tudor Revival
- Location: 10236 Charing Cross Road, Los Angeles, California
- Coordinates: 34°4′35.0″N 118°25′46.6″W
- Construction started: 1927
- Owner: Daren Metropoulos

Technical details
- Floor area: 21,987 sq ft (2,042.7 m^{2})

Design and construction
- Architect: Arthur R. Kelly

Other information
- Number of rooms: 29

The Playboy Mansion, also known as the Playboy Mansion West, is the former home of Playboy magazine founder Hugh Hefner, who lived there from 1971 until his death in 2017. Barbi Benton convinced Hefner to buy the home located in Holmby Hills, Los Angeles, California, near Beverly Hills. From the 1970s onward, the mansion became the location of lavish parties held by Hefner which were often attended by celebrities and socialites. It is currently owned by Daren Metropoulos, the son of billionaire investor Dean Metropoulos, and is used for corporate activities. It also serves as a location for television production, magazine photography, charitable events, and civic functions.

Hefner established the original Playboy Mansion in 1959. It was a brick and limestone residence in Chicago's Gold Coast, which had been built in 1899. Hefner had founded Playboy in Chicago in 1953. After he permanently relocated to California in 1975, his company eventually leased the mansion for a nominal rent to the School of the Art Institute of Chicago and then donated it to the school outright. The school later sold the mansion, which was then redeveloped for luxury condominiums.

== History ==
The 21,987-square-foot (2,042.7 m^{2}) house is described as being in the "Gothic-Tudor" style of architecture by Forbes magazine, and sits on 5.3 acres (2.1 ha). It was designed by Arthur R. Kelly in 1927 as Holmby House for Arthur Letts Jr., son of The Broadway department store founder Arthur Letts.

The estate was acquired by Playboy Enterprises (as with the earlier Chicago Mansion, Hefner nominally rented his living accommodations from the company, which also designated the homes as promotional facilities) in 1971 for $1.05 million (equivalent to $8.35 million in 2025). Its previous owner was Louis D. Statham (1908–1983), a foundational biomedical engineer and prominent chess aficionado who had acquired the estate in 1961 before implementing a two-year renovation program and thence divesting the property in the broader context of the 1965 death of his first wife, Anne, a socially prominent figure known for her membership in the Southern California Symphony Association and past presidencies of the Beverly Hills Women's Club and the Beverly Hills Garden Club. As Statham had largely relocated to the rural Owens Valley enclave of Lone Pine, California (where he would host and endow the annual Lone Pine International chess tournament) in the wake of her death, the estate (now known as Statham House) was primarily utilized throughout the late 1960s by the Les Dames de Champagne hospitality group, composed of socialites who served as a "welcoming committee" for visiting dignitaries in Los Angeles; Statham (who shared his late wife's penchant for classical music) sang a selection from The Magic Flute at one of the group's annual masked balls during this period. In early 2011, it was valued at $54 million. It sits close to the northwestern corner of the Los Angeles Country Club, near the University of California, Los Angeles and the Bel-Air Country Club. Following the company's acquisition of the property, $15 million was invested in renovation and expansion. Although greatly augmented, much of the Statham-era staff (including more than a dozen gardeners and property superintendent Dick Hall, who would emerge as an integral project-management stakeholder throughout the estate's 1970s renovations) was retained by Playboy Enterprises, often for decades.

During Hefner's 46 years in residence, the main house encompassed 29 rooms, including five guest bedrooms (routinely housing such "Rabbit Pack" mainstays as James Caan, Bill Cosby, Tony Curtis, Max Lerner and Hefner's best friend John Dante for indefinite [and typically extended] periods throughout the 1970s and 1980s, these bedrooms later domiciled Hefner's retinue of girlfriends in the 2000s; by this juncture, corporate controls ensured that the publisher was required to pay tens of thousands of dollars of rent per month to Playboy Enterprises for their accommodations); the two-story Great Hall (with 22-foot ceilings and staircases leading directly from the entrance area to the second floor); a catering kitchen (with walk-in refrigerator and freezer), butler's pantry, Regency era-inspired dining room and adjacent, breakfast-oriented Mediterranean Room (colloquially characterized as the "Med Room"; while Hefner continued to hew to the Chicago Mansion's tradition of 24-hour food service at Playboy Mansion West, non-menu orders at the latter facility were explicitly contingent on available resources); a wine cellar (with a Prohibition-era secret door); a library (frequently utilized as a formal meeting room and backgammon/Monopoly-oriented gaming space by Hefner, who instead stored the preponderance of his media collections in his suite/office); and a living room with a built-in pipe organ that increasingly functioned as a dedicated screening room (replete with projection facilities added by Hefner, who continued his Chicago-era tradition of showing first-release films during a Sunday evening buffet dinner alongside similar events oriented around other films and major boxing matches) throughout Playboy's era of ownership. The house also contained six full bathrooms and two half-bathrooms, some of which were en suite in Hefner's bedroom and the other guest bedrooms. The servants' quarters in the west wing were reconfigured to house various administrative offices, including several on the second floor that were occupied by longtime Hefner majordomo Mary O'Connor, social secretary/former Playmate Joni Mattis and other key members of Hefner's personal staff.

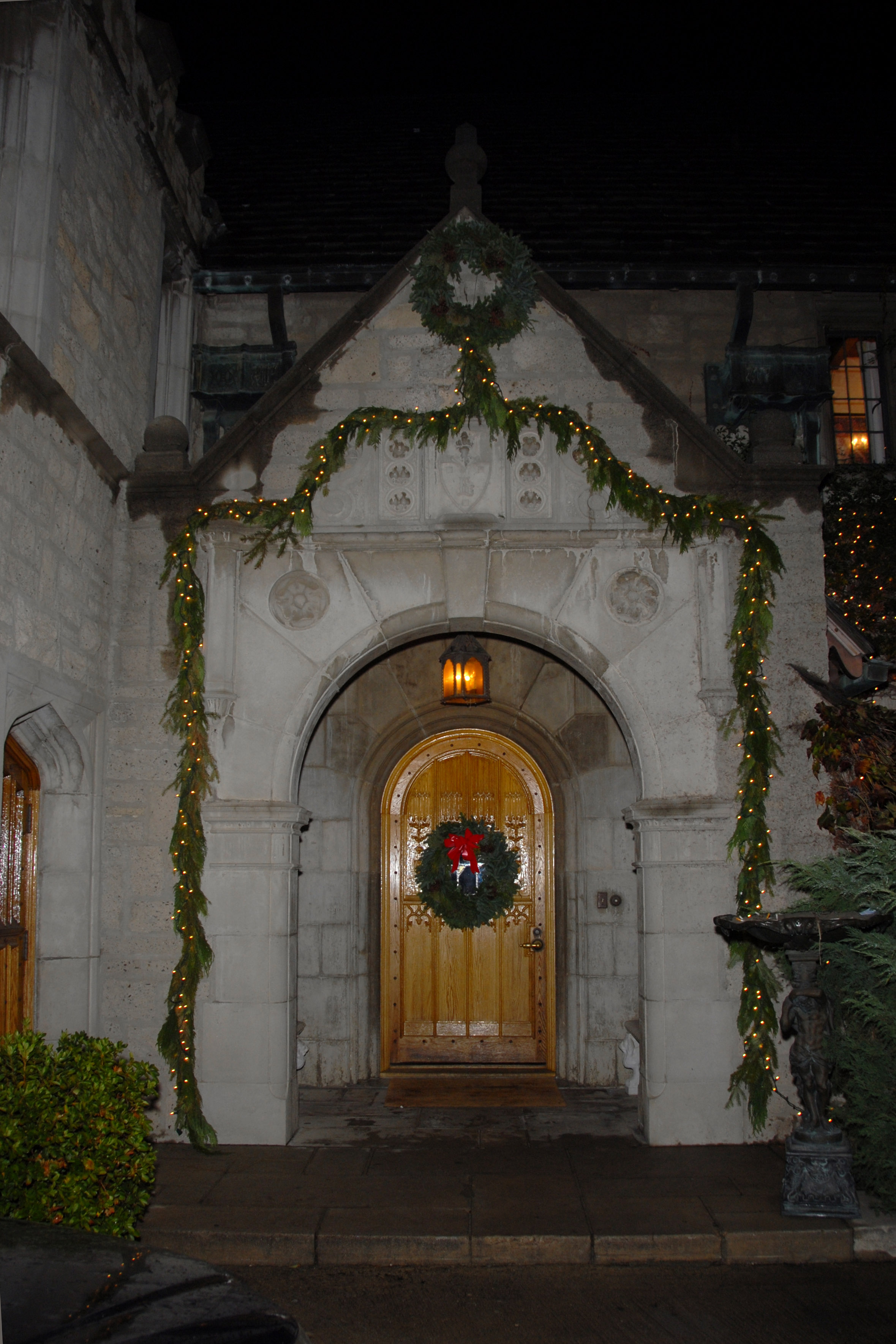
The mansion's front door in 2007

In addition, the estate featured several outbuildings and external amenities, including an aviary (featuring an array of birds, lizards and exotic flora alongside tropical aquaria) derived from the property's original trio of greenhouses (the main aviary was the principal greenhouse, which housed a rare orchid collection maintained by Anne Statham); one of the only private licensed zoos in the United States (replete with several primate enclosures and reportedly envisioned in part by Hefner to rankle the members and guests of the adjacent Los Angeles Country Club [which had refused to admit him following his migration to the West Coast], it was completed in the early 1980s after a decade of more improvisatory post-licensing accommodations in the aviary, backyard and redwood forest); a four-room guest house that was initially decorated by Barbi Benton in an early Americana motif (originally offering comparatively minimalistic, Holiday Inn-style accommodations for visiting models and various figures in Hefner's extended social orbit, it was later remodeled by Holly Madison in a Playboy-centric theme exemplified by decorated bedrooms inspired by the likes of Marilyn Monroe and Pamela Anderson); a Hefner-stipulated sunken tennis court with a stone-adorned, chaise longue-suffused bar/lounge area (completed by the spring of 1972 but no longer extant in its original form, the court itself was long favored by Timothy Leary for practicing yoga, while longtime Playboy Enterprises architect Ron Dirsmith extolled the bar/lounge area as his favorite part of the Hefner-era estate, in part due to its optimal vantage for sunsets and relative tranquility amid the bustle of the main house and its immediately adjacent amenities) and then-atypical wind-minimizing landscaping (attracting hundreds of Hollywood-oriented charitable events and visits from such venerable talents as Pancho Gonzales, it also was frequently employed as an ad hoc roller rink/basketball court/miscellaneous event space by the late 1970s); the backyard's celebrated waterfall/swimming pool area (finished by Dirsmith's team in early September 1971 upon adhering to a four month deadline spontaneously imposed by Hefner, it included large stone outcroppings alongside a patio and outdoor kitchen/barbecue area facing the pool; embedded alongside the outcroppings, a publicly surreptitious grotto connected the pool to several then-au courant hot tubs with unprecedented "hydrotherapy" capabilities in a diaphanously lit environment germane to Hefner's epochal group sex preoccupations; while a 1980s-era basement gym was added [likely to appease Hefner's then-partner Carrie Leigh] below the bathhouse, which included several early-to-mid-1970s-era dressing rooms with stone-encased showers, an oversized sauna, tanning beds and a lounging area). Extensive landscaping shielded the property from the adjacent Los Angeles Country Club and was exemplified by the likes of a large koi pond with an artificial stream, a small citrus orchard and two well-established forests of tree ferns and redwoods (the latter was ultimately developed with nearly a mile of walkways).

Initially coterminous with the main bedroom and bathroom, Hefner's personal suite retained the Queen Anne style furniture and verdant color schemes effectuated by Anne Statham during much of his "bicoastal" period; however, it was gradually redecorated in a more masculine style and had been outfitted with large CRT projector televisions (alongside the customary array of secondary televisions and advanced video and stereo equipment) by early 1975. A finished attic added thousands of square feet of personal office and storage space in the half-decade thereafter, culminating in the addition of a carved-oak decor in the office and bedroom installed circa 1980. Otherwise, the mansion proper was maintained in its original Gothic Revival furnishings for the most part. The pipe organ was restored in the last decade. These features and others have been shown on television.

Located on the north side of the property, the game house outbuilding was added by the Stathams as a playhouse for their grandchildren before serving as Statham's office (including a meeting room, trophy room, and the earliest iteration of the game room) by the late 1960s. It was favored by many Mansion West visitors and habitués, often functioning as a relatively isolated oasis of sexual ribaldry and drug use among "Rabbit Pack" or "Gang List" affiliates during protracted formal events and Hefner family visits. There were two sidewalks from the fountain in front of the main entrance, running past a wishing well. A path on the right led to the game house and ran past a duplicate Hollywood Walk of Fame star of Hefner. Its front entrance opened to a game room with a pool table in the center. Ostensibly patterned after the Chicago Mansion's game room (an area in fact distinguished by its relative dearth of sexual activity amid Hefner's stringently styled, dextroamphetamine-adjacent gaming interludes of the late 1960s and early 1970s), it contained vintage and modern arcade games and pinball machines (including some that were originally housed at the Chicago Mansion) in addition to a player piano, jukebox, television, stereo, and couch. The remainder of the outbuilding was devoted to several small bedrooms which frequently hosted impromptu sexual encounters. The left wing contained a sexually propitious "alcove room" (later primarily characterized as the "van room" due to its resemblance to an internally customized Dodge Ram Van of the 1970s) reportedly customized circa 1979 with a television, en suite bathroom and a soft-cushioned floor (possibly of vanguard construction in the 1970s, 2000s-era visitors reported its abject lack of comfortability during extended "scenes") surrounded by unabashedly voyeuristic wall-to-wall mirrors. The right wing of the game house has a smaller restroom and entrance to a bedroom. This bedroom was connected to another bedroom (both featured sprawling ceiling mirrors and were frequently employed for ephemeral trysts during parties), which had an exit that faced a rear yard maintained with lounge chairs and gates on both sides.

In 2006, Hefner's former girlfriend, Izabella St. James, wrote in her memoir, Bunny Tales, that the main house had been severely neglected in the decades since Playboy Enterprises's halcyon years in the publishing, hospitality and gambling industries and required extensive renovations: "Everything in the Mansion felt old and stale, and Archie the house dog would regularly relieve himself on the hallway curtains, adding a powerful whiff of urine to the general scent of decay." She also observed: "Each bedroom had mismatched, random pieces of furniture. It was as if someone had gone to a charity shop and bought the basics for each room", and that: "The mattresses on our beds were disgusting – old, worn and stained. The sheets were past their best, too."

During Hefner's marriage to Kimberly Conrad, the Mansion adopted a more conservative atmosphere, with many lingerie-foregrounded events (including the annual New Year's Eve party) transitioning to a black tie dress code for the duration of their relationship.

The mansion next door is a mirror image of the Playboy Mansion layout, only smaller, and was purchased by Hefner in 1996, which would eventually serve as the home for Conrad and their children, Marston and Cooper, when she and Hefner separated. Hefner and Conrad married in 1989 and separated in 1998. In March 2009, Hefner and Conrad put the property up for sale for the asking price of $28 million. In August 2009, the property was purchased by Daren Metropoulos for $18 million.

In 2002, Hefner purchased a house across and down the street from the mansion for use by Playmates and other guests who would prefer to stay further from the busy activity of the Mansion proper. That residence was commonly referred to as the Bunny House. In April 2013, the Bunny House was listed for sale for the asking price of $11 million. In September 2017, the property was sold to an unidentified buyer for $17.25 million. In February 2019, 2 episodes of Million Dollar Listing Los Angeles (S11.E8–E9) aired which documented an attempt to purchase the Bunny House & the neighboring Mommie Dearest Home by a developer with the goal of forming a large compound/development. In the episode the sale went through and it is suspected that this was the sale referenced in New York Post based on 2/3 of the same real estates mentioned being involved in the on-screen sale.

=== Sale of the Playboy Mansion ===
In January 2016, the Playboy Mansion was listed for sale by Playboy Enterprises, Inc. for the asking price of $200 million, subject to the condition Hefner be allowed to continue to rent the mansion for life. In August 2016, the Playboy Mansion was bought for $100 million by Daren Metropoulos, the co-owner of Hostess Brands and a principal in the investment firm C. Dean Metropoulos & Co. Metropoulos intends to renovate and restore the mansion to its original form.

In 2009, Metropoulos bought the mansion next door to the Playboy Mansion from Hefner and his ex-wife Kimberly Conrad, and ultimately now wants to join the two properties. The Playboy Mansion and the mansion next door owned by Metropoulos were both designed by American architect Arthur Rolland Kelly and each estate has a common boundary with the Los Angeles Country Club.

In May 2016, Eugena Washington was the last Playmate of the Year to be announced by Hefner at the Playboy Mansion.

=== Permanent protection covenant ===
In March 2018, Daren Metropoulos, the owner of the Playboy Mansion, entered into an agreement with the City of Los Angeles which permanently protects the mansion from demolition. The agreement between Metropoulos and the City of Los Angeles, referred to between the parties as a "permanent protection covenant," is binding on all future owners. The agreement protects the mansion from demolition, but still allows Metropoulos to make modernizations and substantial renovations and repairs to the property "following a long period of deferred maintenance while under Playboy ownership."

Under the permanent protection covenant, Metropoulos has further agreed to restore the house and facade to "its original grandeur." The compromise agreement reversed a move in November 2017 by Los Angeles City Councilmember Paul Koretz to seek landmark status for the mansion in the hope of protecting the architectural integrity of the estate for what he called "an excellent example of a Gothic-Tudor." If designated a historic landmark, Metropoulos would have faced a lengthy process for permitting and review for the rehabilitation of the property. The permanent protection covenant avoided a potentially drawn out and contentious legal action between the City of Los Angeles and Metropoulos for the City of Los Angeles seeking the formal designation of the mansion as a historic landmark.

=== Original Chicago Mansion ===
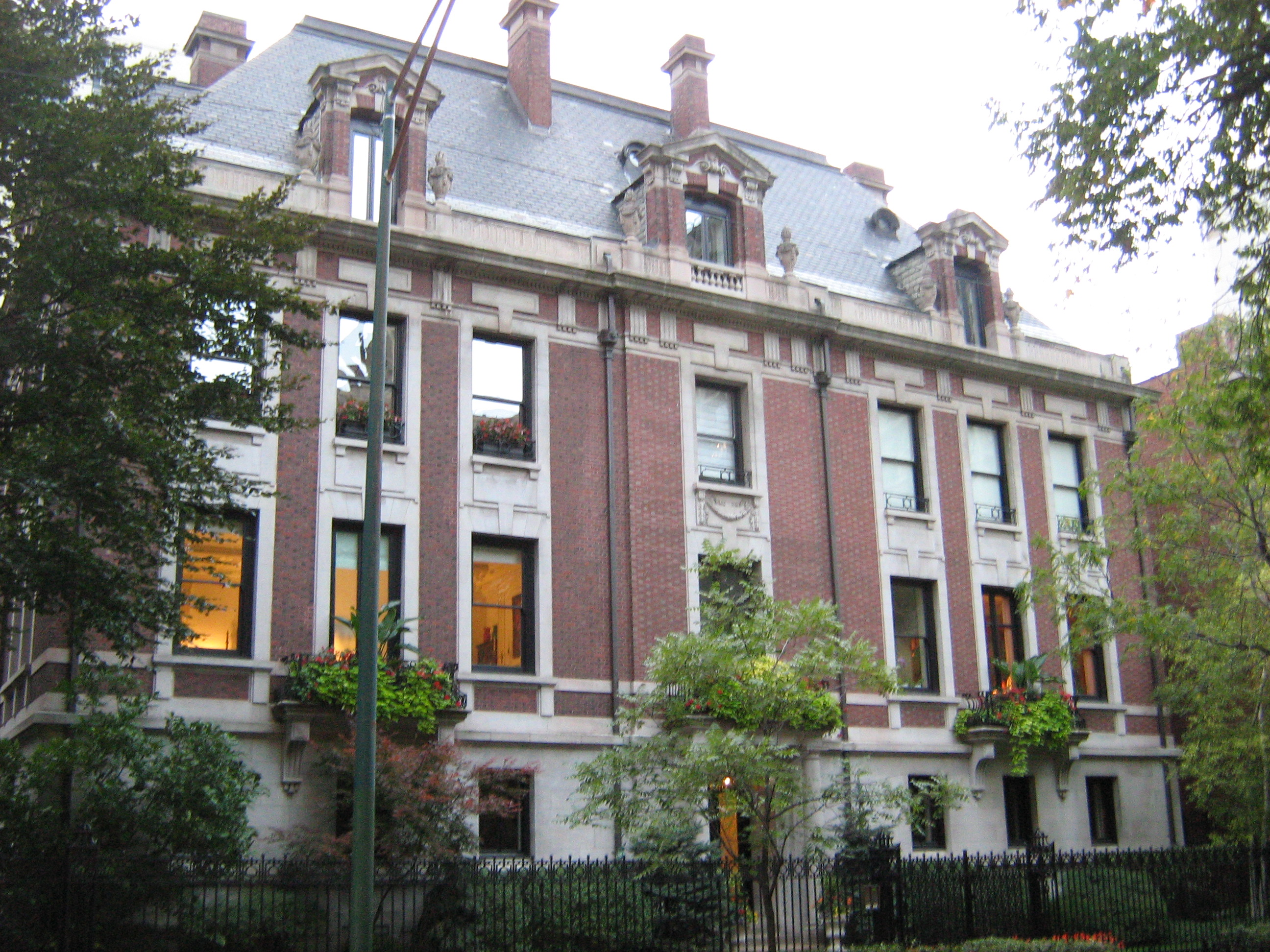
The original Playboy Mansion in Chicago

The original Playboy Mansion was a 54-room 30,000 sq ft (2,800 m^{2}) classical brick and limestone residence in Chicago's Gold Coast district at 1340 North State Parkway which had been built in 1899 (or 1903) for $100,000 (equivalent to $3.6 million in 2025). Its original owner was Dr. George Swift Isham, a prominent surgeon whose social circle included Theodore Roosevelt and Robert Peary. The building was designed by architect James Gamble Rogers, best known for his work at Yale University and Columbia University.

==== Acquisition by Playboy ====
In December 1959, the building was acquired by Playboy Enterprises in a $370,000 (equivalent to $4.1 million in 2025) cash transaction. Initially dominated by the house's garage, the Chicago Mansion's basement was renovated upon occupancy to encompass a swimming pool with a glass wall and a Tiki culture-themed attached bar; a putatively secluded nook adjacent to the pool was designated as the Woo Grotto (presaging the later amenity at Playboy Mansion West) and "could only be entered by swimming through a waterfall softly splashing between the thatched huts and fake palm trees" that constituted the prevalent decor, although a secret button in the upstairs ballroom "lifted a trap door in the floor of the ballroom above the Woo Grotto" as a reification of "Hefner's little joke: couples canoodling on the grotto's plastic cushions would suddenly find a square hole, rimmed by leering faces, had appeared in the roof."

In addition to other basement facilities (including a six-car garage, steam rooms, a tanning room and an exercise/game room), a large ballroom dominated the first two stories of the house. Although this capacious area was employed most prominently during Hefner's residency as the center of the house's weekly Friday parties, open to most of the media company's staff; more occasional major fundraisers for political and charitable causes, particularly after Hefner's bellicose post-1968 embrace of left-liberal politics (much to the chagrin of longtime Playboy editorial director/associate publisher A. C. Spectorsky); and weekly-to-semiweekly buffets accompanied by film screenings that were attended by Hefner's closest friends and various employees, it also served as a de facto corporate meeting space, media room (in the context of press conferences) and living room for Hefner, particularly amid the protracted board game sessions that occupied much of his time in the early 1970s.

Alongside a restaurant-type kitchen, the residence contained a top-floor dormitory for Bunnies employed at the Chicago Playboy Club, up to six discrete apartments and seven deluxe furnished guest rooms. Most notable in contemporaneous press accounts were the luxurious Blue Room and Red Room, which were immediately accessible from the ballroom (sharing a common bathroom) and were frequently occupied by Hefner's closest associates. These ranged from Playmates completing protracted photo shoots to visiting Playboy contributors like Norman Mailer and peripatetic cartoonist-songwriter Shel Silverstein, a lifelong Hefner confidante who lived in the Red Room during extended stays in their mutual hometown until the mothballing of the Chicago Mansion in 1975. Longtime Hefner aide Bobbie Arnstein also resided consecutively in two of the house's apartments throughout much of her tenure, while Hefner's best friend John Dante (a onetime Chicago nightclub owner who worked for Playboy Enterprises in various capacities [ranging from head Bunny recruiter to Chicago Mansion house manager] during the 1960s and early 1970s) lived in a three-and-a-half room apartment at the house from the mid-1960s until circa early 1974.

Located on the second floor of the building, Hefner's personal suite (containing a three-room apartment and bathroom) was prominently connected to the Roman Bath, an "elaborate bathing/sleeping area" designed for marathon group sex sessions that almost always encompassed Hefner, Dante and their respective paramours; installed circa 1970, it contained "baroque gold spigots and faucets that sprayed and showered" alongside "a tub with chest-high water" and a mirrored alcove with an early (and mink-covered) waterbed. Hefner's suite also was connected to three additional rooms that were employed as the publisher's nominal office (notwithstanding his oft-publicized penchant for working in his bedroom's metonymous round rotating/vibrating bed).

The Chicago Mansion also boasted a brass plate on the door—gifted to Hefner by A. C. Spectorsky, the magazine's influential editorial director—with the Latin inscription Si Non Oscillas, Noli Tintinnare ("If you don't swing, don't ring").

==== Expansion ====
An adjacent 20-room townhouse at 1336 North State Parkway (originally built with a connection to 1340 North State Parkway as a residence for Isham's daughter in 1914) was reincorporated into the complex in 1970; acquired in cash for $550,000 (equivalent to $4.6 million in 2025), it contained a board room, ancillary offices and bedrooms (including an addition to the Bunny dormitory, which could now accommodate more than 30 boarders). In addition, a single-lane bowling alley (possibly built for Christie Hefner and featuring a gold-plated ball for the elder Hefner, who largely eschewed the sport after proving to be a middling bowler) was furnished in the annex's basement; following nearly two years of "planning, remodeling, and building," the facility opened in July 1972.

==== Hefner's declining Chicago presence ====
From 1971 until mid-1974 (while generally adhering to an every-other-week pattern of residency that had been established in the context of his earlier Sunset Boulevard apartment since circa July-August 1968), Hefner divided his time relatively evenly between the Chicago Mansion and the Playboy Mansion West, although he was ensconced in Chicago for extended periods in 1971-72 (as the initial renovation phases at Playboy Mansion West were completed) and again in early-to-mid-1973 amid business difficulties and an intensifying romantic relationship. Thereafter, he moved his legal permanent residence to Los Angeles at an indeterminate juncture in 1975 (likely in tandem with its official September 1975 "mothballing") and continued to utilize his Chicago Mansion apartment as an irregular pied-à-terre for several weeks of the year until late 1976. According to a 1979 U.S. Securities and Exchange Commission decision, the publisher spent as much as 71% of his time (8.5 months) at the Chicago Mansion in 1972, a metric that dwindled to approximately 55% (6.6 months) in 1973 and approximately 40% (4.8 months) in 1974. These tabulations were slightly attenuated by as much as a month in practice because they also encompassed Hefner's most frenetic period of non-Los Angeles business and leisure travel, including stays in such locales as Nashville, Tennessee (where Benton was partially based during the period), New York City, Miami Beach, Florida (by virtue of the ill-fated Playboy Plaza Hotel venture), the state of Hawaii and Walt Disney World.

Although Playboy Enterprises remained headquartered in Chicago until 2012, Hefner's aforementioned 1975 designation of the Mansion West as his primary residence followed the criminal conviction and ensuing death by suicide of Bobbie Arnstein, the culmination of an "investigation of drug use in Hefner's mansion" by U.S. Attorney for the Northern District of Illinois (and future Governor of Illinois) James R. Thompson that attracted significant publicity after Arnstein's March 21, 1974 indictment. Arnstein's death by suicide (which occurred at the Maryland Hotel, situated in the immediate vicinity of the Chicago Mansion) followed the high-profile September 1973 death of Adrienne Pollack—a 23-year-old Bunny and former dormitory resident who was rumored to have served as Arnstein's deputy in proffering recreational drugs for guests and orgy participants at the Chicago Mansion—from a methaqualone overdose. While former Playboy editor and unauthorized Hefner biographer Frank Brady asserted in an addendum for the paperback edition of his book that Arnstein "barely knew who [Pollack] was," it remains unclear if his reporting was rooted in secondhand (and potentially obfuscatory) assertions from Hefner and/or other colleagues.

Hefner's use of the Chicago Mansion had already declined precipitously following his circa mid-April 1974 breakup with Playmate Karen Christy, who had been domiciled there as his primary companion in the city (Barbi Benton seldom visited Chicago after the acquisition of the Mansion West) since 1971. Attorneys also had likely advised Hefner to keep a professional distance from Arnstein (who was in the early stages of preparing to move to Los Angeles—under the stipulation of residing offsite [initially at the Sunset Marquis, with an eventual plan of sharing a house with the family of best friend/longtime aide Shirley Hillman and Marilyn Cole] instead of Playboy Mansion West as a legally shielding condition of maintaining her role with the company—at the time of her death) for the duration of her proceedings, prompting him to spend even more of his time at the Mansion West no later than August 1974 (as inferred from the dates of newspapers that remained in Hefner's apartment for much of the next decade).

Additionally, the December 1974 resignation of Robert J. Adelman (then chairman of the Rubloff Company, an influential Chicago real estate conglomerate) from Playboy Enterprises's board in the aftermath of the Arnstein conviction appears to have further estranged Hefner from the local business community, which was long circumspect of his lifestyle. "Things were very different here [in Los Angeles] from Chicago," Hefner later recalled. "Tom Bradley, the mayor, attended the opening of the Playboy Club and was a frequent guest at the parties and so was Jerry Brown, the governor." According to Hefner friend and fellow pornographer Suze Randall, the Chicago Mansion "had for some time been hired out for large business meetings" (such as a January 1975 convention for the Texas food industry that coincided with Arnstein's death and a Randall business trip) "in an attempt to make it pay its way" as a profitable event space. During a thwarted attempt to sell the property amid Playboy Enterprises' financial difficulties in July 1975, Senior Vice President Victor Lownes estimated that the publisher only spent three weeks at the Chicago Mansion (including several short business trips, a visit centered around Arnstein's funeral and a similar stay for a May 1975 backgammon tournament) during the previous year. "After [Arnstein] died, there really wasn't a lot of reason for going back [to the Chicago Mansion]," Hefner recalled in 2009. "There really wasn't anything left for me there."

Unbeknownst to the public at the time, the decision to officially "mothball" the Chicago Mansion in 1975 also coincided with a substantial increase (from $7,800 to $36,000 per year) in the fair rental value of the publisher's Chicago accommodations—likely in anticipation of 1978 disputes with the Internal Revenue Service and a shareholder group concerning Hefner's potential embezzlement of corporate assets through the Mansion lease agreements—prompting the publisher to only renew his Playboy Mansion West lease thereafter after years of residency in both facilities contingent on ad hoc extensions of his 1969-72 Chicago Mansion lease. Indeed, sources told Larry Ingrassia of the Chicago Sun-Times that a skeleton staff had already been effectively instituted at the Chicago Mansion in the weeks immediately following Arnstein's death, but operating costs for the complex remained in the vicinity of $600,000 per year even in such a relatively quiescent state; while a full closure would have reduced operating expenses to $48,000 per year pending its sale, Hefner's voluble nostalgia for the house (buttressed perhaps by the tacitly political factors that spurred his relocation) precluded the seemingly inevitable drawdown for nearly a decade.

The contemporaneous sale of the Big Bunny (the company's heavily modified 1969 McDonnell Douglas DC-9-32 business jet, which was almost exclusively employed for commutation purposes by Hefner and his immediate entourage or flown under the auspices of Ozark Air Lines-operated, Playboy-serviced air charters retained by the likes of Elvis Presley and Sonny & Cher, in addition to the requisite patina of a philanthropic mien, such as an April 1975 excursion during Operation Babylift) would largely render his previous lifestyle untenable due to his disdain of commercial aviation.

==== "Mothballing" and later visits ====
Beginning in the summer of 1975, the Chicago Mansion was maintained with a "skeleton staff" of approximately 10 to 12 security and maintenance employees (having previously burgeoned to a height of 50 staff members during the facility's 1960s heyday, approximately 15 full-time staffers remained when Lownes instituted layoffs in mid-1975) and primarily opened thereafter to the public for "occasional charity benefits and business functions" following the concomitant closure of the Bunny dormitory. The oft-publicized "hutch"'s population had already dwindled to 20 (against a total capacity of 36 berths following the acquisition of the 1336 North State Parkway annex; residents included 12 Bunnies assigned to the Chicago Playboy Club and eight "Jet Bunnies" who provided flight attendant service on Big Bunny flights in addition to their Club duties) by September 1973 due to onerously restrictive on-site visitation policies and paternalistic provisions governing the boarders' alcohol use at the Mansion. Although these restrictions were offset by an egalitarian $50/month berth rent (equivalent to $363/month in 2025), daily maid service and inexpensive, a la carte 24-hour room service from the Mansion kitchen, only six Bunnies lived in the dormitory by mid-1975. During this period, Derick Daniels (who served as president and chief operating officer of Playboy Enterprises from 1976 to 1982) lived in a Chicago Mansion apartment throughout his first year with the company.

While Hefner vowed to "spend more time" in the city amid various meetings (and a lengthy press conference) at the Chicago Mansion following the controversial dismissal of Anthony Jackson (a recruiter then characterized as Playboy's highest-ranking Black executive) in August 1975, his few documented visits to the Chicago Mansion thereafter consisted of October and November 1975 stays referenced in subsequent press reports, at least four spring-to-autumn 1976 trips (most notably a July visit pegged to an awards luncheon for Elton John and Bernie Taupin) that effectively ceased after Daniels assumed his role as president in September, a December 1978 holiday jaunt coinciding with one of the magazine's 25th anniversary parties (with a guest list that ran the gamut from Hefner's polyamorous Los Angeles circle to onetime Chicago Mansion stalwarts like Shel Silverstein) and a November 1979 trip in conjunction with his longstanding support of the Chicago International Film Festival; actor Harry Reems (alleged by contemporaneous Mansion butler Stefan Tetenbaum to have engaged in distinct sexual assignations during this period with both Hefner and his longtime executive assistant, Mary O'Connor) accompanied the publisher on the visit en route to a New York City theatrical engagement. (In place of external caterers or temporary employees, Mansion West staff accompanied Hefner on the latter two stays to supervise house operations.)

==== Sale and conversion ====
Although the complex had been put on sale for $2.3 million (equivalent to $13 million in 2025) by late 1976 (increased to $2.5 million [equivalent to $13.3 million in 2025] a year later), Hefner's apartment and office (including many of his remaining personal effects) remained virtually untouched during the ensuing interregnum.

When no buyers manifested, the main building was leased for $10 per year as a dormitory (under the imprimatur of Hefner Hall) for the School of the Art Institute of Chicago in August 1984; as part of the agreement, the School purchased 1336 North State Parkway outright for $500,000 (equivalent to $1.5 million in 2025), while Playboy Enterprises formally deeded 1340 North State Parkway to the Art Institute when the agreement lapsed in 1989. In 1993, the Chicago Mansion was sold to developer Bruce Abrams and converted into seven high-price luxury condos. In 2011, one 7,874 sq ft (731.5 m^{2}) condominium was placed for sale at an asking price of $6.7 million.

== In popular culture and media appearances ==
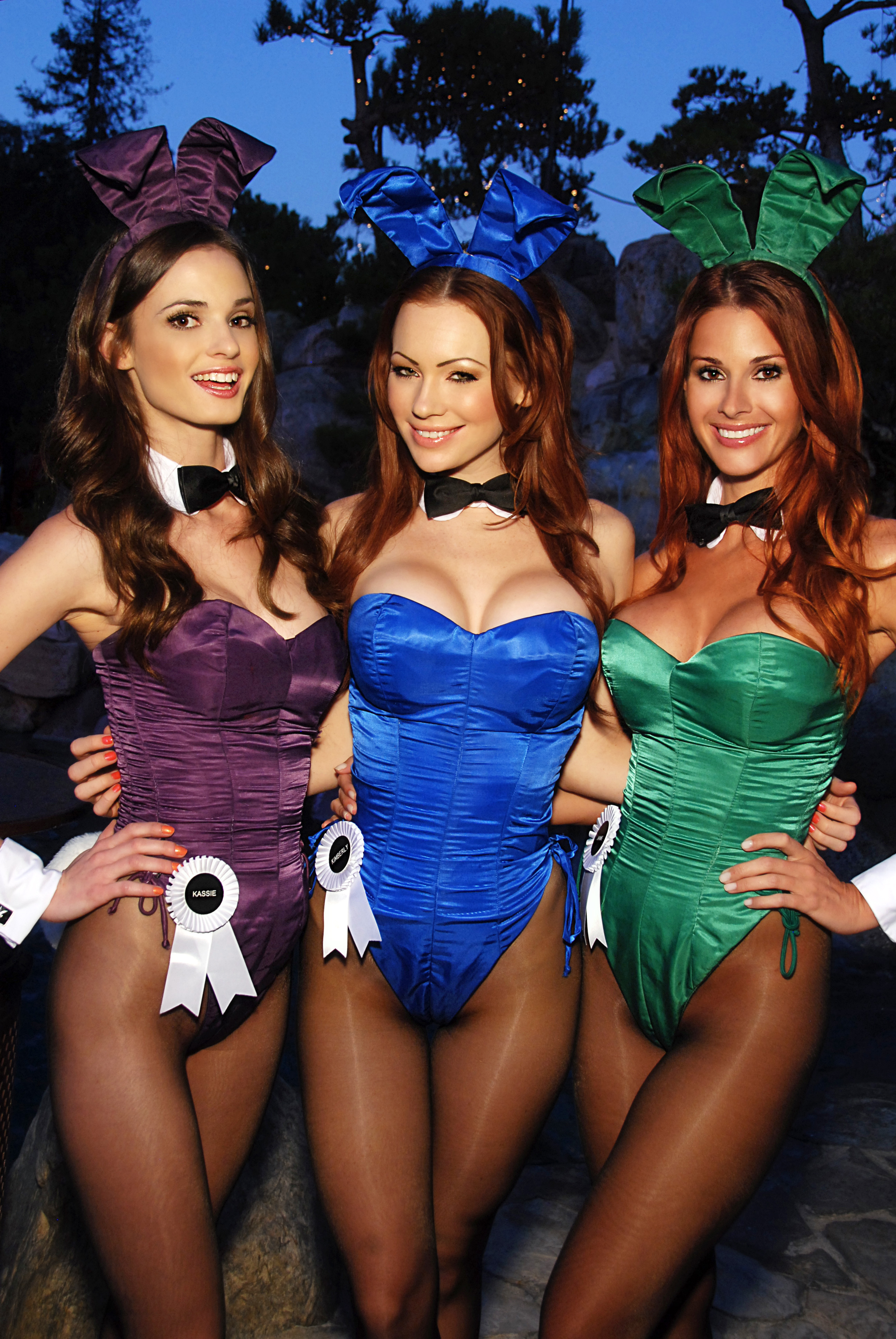
Playboy Bunny waitresses at the Mansion in 2011

=== Film and television ===
- The Mansion appears in the 1966 film Madame X, prior to its purchase by Playboy the following decade.
- It was used as a filming location in Beverly Hills Cop II, in which Hefner makes a cameo appearance as himself.
- The Mansion served as the Starting Line for the 12th season of CBS's long-running reality competition series The Amazing Race.
- The property appears as a party venue in the first season of the television series Entourage.
- The Mansion and Hefner were prominently featured in the 2005 episode "The Smoking Jacket" of Curb Your Enthusiasm.
- The Mansion was a central setting in the 2008 film The House Bunny, with Hefner again portraying himself.
- In the 2011 film Hop, the Mansion's front gate is featured in a scene in which the character EB attempts to gain entry. Hefner, in a voice-only cameo, declines the request. Later, during a separate scene, Hefner again appears over the entry phone before the Pink Berets destroy the camera.
- The Mansion is also featured briefly in the 2019 film Once Upon a Time in Hollywood.

=== Music and video games ===
- Despite its location in Holmby Hills, the Mansion served as the setting for the 2005 music video to "Beverly Hills" by the band Weezer.
- A property modeled on the Playboy Mansion appears in the 2013 video game Grand Theft Auto V.

=== Other appearances ===
- The Mansion is briefly mentioned in the last panel of the Big Nate comic strip October 10, 2016 edition, which depicts Mr. Galvin denying Nate permission to interview him for the school newspaper, as the last time Nate wrote about him he included a photoshopped image of Mr. Galvin's head on Leonardo DiCaprio's body at the Playboy Mansion, leading readers to begin to view Mr. Galvin as a "philandering party animal."

== Financial ==
According to Playboy Enterprises' SEC filings, Hefner paid Playboy rent for "that portion of the Playboy Mansion used exclusively for him and his personal guests' residence as well as the per-unit value of non-business meals, beverages and other benefits received by him and his personal guests". This amount was $1.3 million in 2002, $1.4 million in 2003, and $1.3 million in 2004.

Playboy paid for the Mansion's operating expenses (including depreciation and taxes), which were $3.6 million in 2002, $2.3 million in 2003, and $3.0 million in 2004, net of rent received from Hefner.

== Charity events ==
The Playboy Mansion has hosted charity events, including Karma Foundation, the Celebrity Poker Tournament, a fundraising party for the Marijuana Policy Project, and an event to benefit research into autism.

== 2011 bacterial outbreak ==
In February 2011, 123 people complained of fever and respiratory illness after attending a DomainFest Global conference event held at the Playboy Mansion. After an investigation in response to the reported illnesses of the DomainFest attendees, epidemiologists from the Los Angeles County Department of Public Health disclosed their findings at a Centers for Disease Control conference. The disease outbreak was traced to a hot tub in the mansion's famed grotto, where they found Legionella pneumophila, which causes Legionnaires' disease.

== Abuse allegations ==
The 2022 A&E documentary series Secrets of Playboy featured interviews with former Playboy employees who alleged numerous acts of sexual and drug abuse took place at the mansion during Hefner's lifetime. Before the first episode of the documentary series aired on January 24, 2022, Playboy released a statement which dissociated itself from Hefner. On June 21, 2022, a California civil trial jury found that comedian Bill Cosby sexually assaulted 16-year-old Judith Huth at the Playboy Mansion in 1975.

In response to Sondra Theodore's later claim that Hefner manipulated her into an orgy and hosted prostitution sex parties known as "Pig Nights" during the time she lived at the Playboy Mansion, a spokesperson for Playboy issued a statement to Fox News Digital in August 2022 saying that "Today's Playboy is not Hugh Hefner's Playboy," and that "We trust and validate these women and their stories, and we strongly support those individuals who have come forward to share their experiences. As a brand with sex positivity at its core, we believe safety, security and accountability are paramount." Soon afterwards, renowned Playmate Jenny McCarthy, who was affiliated with Playboy in later time in 1993 and 1994, claimed to Fox News that she did not experience the claims described in Secrets of Playboy and that the mansion had become "almost like Catholic school" by the time she was living there, but also did not speak out against the claims made by the Secrets Of Playboy accusers, stating "I think I went in there in a window of time that was kind of safe, but hearing some of these girls' stories was really rough."

In 2024, Hefner's widow Crystal would publish a memoir backing allegations that the Mansion was an environment of sexual abuse, and also describing it as a place where she felt "imprisoned." Crystal also told The Guardian that "Hef was on the extreme side of narcissism" and "I had to play mind games to survive."

== See also ==
- Stocks House
