= Scientology speedrunning =

2026 online trend

- Location: Church of Scientology branches
- Also known as: Scientology run challenge
- Type: Internet fad

Scientology speedrunning, sometimes called a Scientology run, is a 2026 social media trend which originated on TikTok. Participants attempt to "speedrun" through Church of Scientology facilities, attempting to run in as far as possible before getting stopped while filming themselves.

The trend, which was inspired by video game speedrunning, began with a viral video posted on TikTok in March 2026. It quickly spread as creators attempted increasingly deeper and more disruptive incursions, resulting in police responses, media commentary, and the removal of many videos. It received mixed responses from reporters and journalists. The trend also caught the attention of current and former Scientology members, some of whom alleged that it constituted a hate crime.

== Origin ==
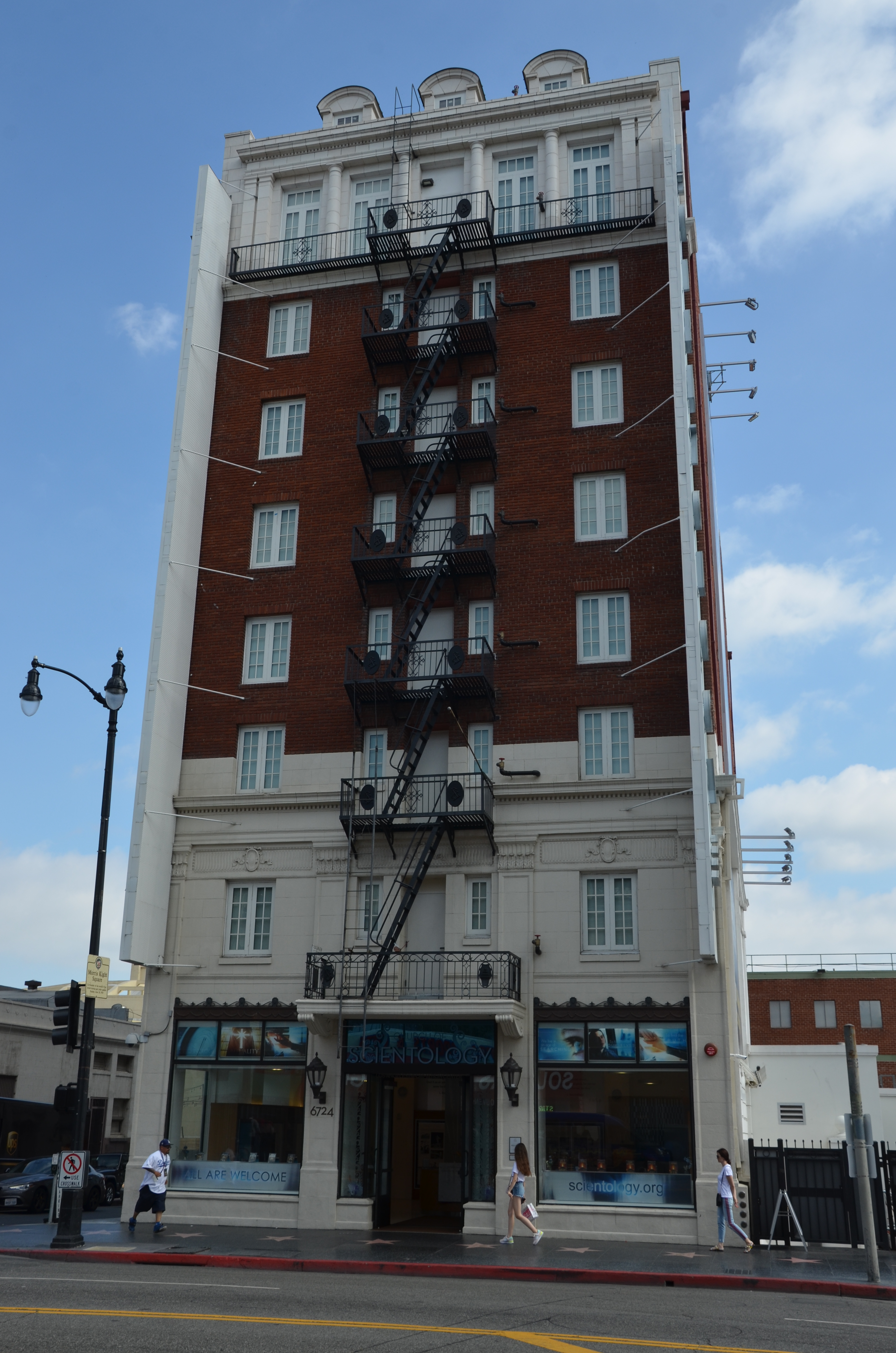
The Church of Scientology Information Center on Hollywood Boulevard, pictured in 2019, where many speedruns have taken place

The trend started in March 2026 at the Church of Scientology Information Center in Hollywood, Los Angeles, California. On March 25, TikToker isDurpyy posted a video of himself running deep inside the building shouting, "Xenu!" until he was escorted out. Separately, a user named Swhileyy was impressed by the views on a video of himself buying a book in the building. The men decided to collaborate, and on March 31 filmed themselves running through the building together into a back office. The video was viewed 90 million times before it was taken down.

More creators started to replicate the video made by Swhileyy and isDurpyy, with many escalating the runs. The Church claims there has been property damage. On April 25, 2026, dozens of individuals rushed into the information center, who, according to the police report filed by the church, knocked over staff and caused property damage, with at least two of them wanted on suspicion of crimes — one on suspicion of burglary and another on suspicion of felony vandalism. Many people also tried to "one-up each other" and achieve the "deepest run", though most attempts end quickly. Some viewers have used the videos to map out the Hollywood facility.

On TikTok, many Scientology run videos have been removed. The Los Angeles Police Department have investigated runs, and at one time detained some of the participants. In late April, the information center in Hollywood removed their door handles in response to the intrusions, as well as public access.

== Development ==
After the initial speedruns in Hollywood, California, and elsewhere in the United States, runs have occurred in other countries, including in Australia, Belgium, Canada, France, Germany, the Netherlands, Switzerland, and the United Kingdom.

On May 1, 2026, two teenage boys filmed themselves speedrunning through a Church of Scientology in the Sydney central business district in Australia, and posted the video on TikTok. The boys were placed under citizen's arrest upon exiting the building, then arrested by the New South Wales Police Force and dealt with under the Youth Offenders Act 1997. The police warned that anyone attempting the challenge could potentially be arrested and charged with trespassing. After the video went viral, the organization increased its security measures in Australia.

In Downtown Vancouver on May 2, 2026, approximately 300 youth descended on the branch. The crowd dispersed within a short period of time, but returned two hours later. One youth was arrested and later released with no charges. On the same day in Times Square in Manhattan, about 25 young people entered and damaged parts of the Scientology branch. Scientology said they considered the incident a "coordinated attack." This led police in San Diego and Vancouver to thwart large Scientology speedruns.

On May 9, 2026, around 200 people attempted to storm the Scientology branch in the Brisbane central business district in Australia, when people arrived after organizing on social media. The attempt failed due to doors being locked. Police arrived at the scene, and some teenagers hopped on top of a police car and used it as a makeshift BMX bike ramp. No arrests were made. On the same day, a group of teenagers broke into a locked Scientology building in Seattle, Washington using a crowbar. Three teens were charged with second-degree burglary and committing a hate crime offense.

== Reception ==
Responses to the activity have been mixed, but cautionary. Vice magazine stated that the trend was humorous but suggested "maybe a better use of Scientology infiltration tactics would be an investigative piece rather than a viral speed run". Gizmodo described it as "this whole situation seems like it can just be chalked up to some kid doing something dumb, and it got out of hand". John Walker of Kotaku found the trend humorous, incredibly childish, and "probably not a good idea to try". CBC News described the trend as "following the blueprints" of Storm Area 51, a similar 2019 trend which saw a sardonic attempt at "raiding" the military facility.

Journalists and anti-Scientology activists have been split on the topic. Some have stated that the runs are an effective form of protest, viewing the Church's reputation for secrecy as a reason to "apply pressure and push for answers". Jenna Miscavige Hill has said that the trend is disrupting the Church's recruitment. Other critics of the organization believed the running trend would backfire. Actress and former Scientologist Leah Remini cautioned that the runs would not be helpful toward exposing the dangers of Scientology because the members inside are dedicated and radicalized. She advised that the incursions would not "lead them to reconsider what they've given up their entire lives for" but instead confirm their beliefs and cause them to further dedicate themselves. Likewise, Yashar Ali says the trend "plays right into Scientology indoctrination that the outside world is a violent place that wishes to disrupt the dissemination of Scientology".

A Scientology official alleged the incidents were "organized trespass" and harassment just for social media attention, that there had been property damage, staff knocked down, and one injury. As of April 28, the LAPD had received just two reports on speedrunning incidents, and was tasked with investigating an April 23 incident "as an alleged hate crime". A former police officer told the Los Angeles Times that participants colliding with Church staff were at legal risk of a charge for battery. Brian Levin, a professor emeritus at Cal State San Bernardino and the founder of the Center for the Study of Hate and Extremism, viewed the runs as a violent invasion of a religious center.

One of the participants said the runs were "a mix of exposure, prank and activism". After the trend went viral, one of the originators of the trend, Swhileyy, publicly urged others to stop.

== See also ==
- Scientology and the Internet
- Area 51 raid
