= Mos Speedrun =

2011 video game

- Developer(s): Physmo
- Platform(s): iOS, Android, Microsoft Windows, Linux
- Release: April 7, 2011
- Genre(s): Platformer

Mos Speedrun is an 8-bit retro-style game by British developer Physmo, released in April 2011 for iOS, October 2011 for PC, and January 2012 for Android.

Gameplay revolves around clearing levels and collecting coins as quickly as possible but forgoes the virtual d-pad typically used by iOS platformers in favor of a simplified two button control system.

Physmo later came out with a sequel, named Mos Speedrun 2.
