= William S. Hart Regional Park =

County park in Santa Clarita, California

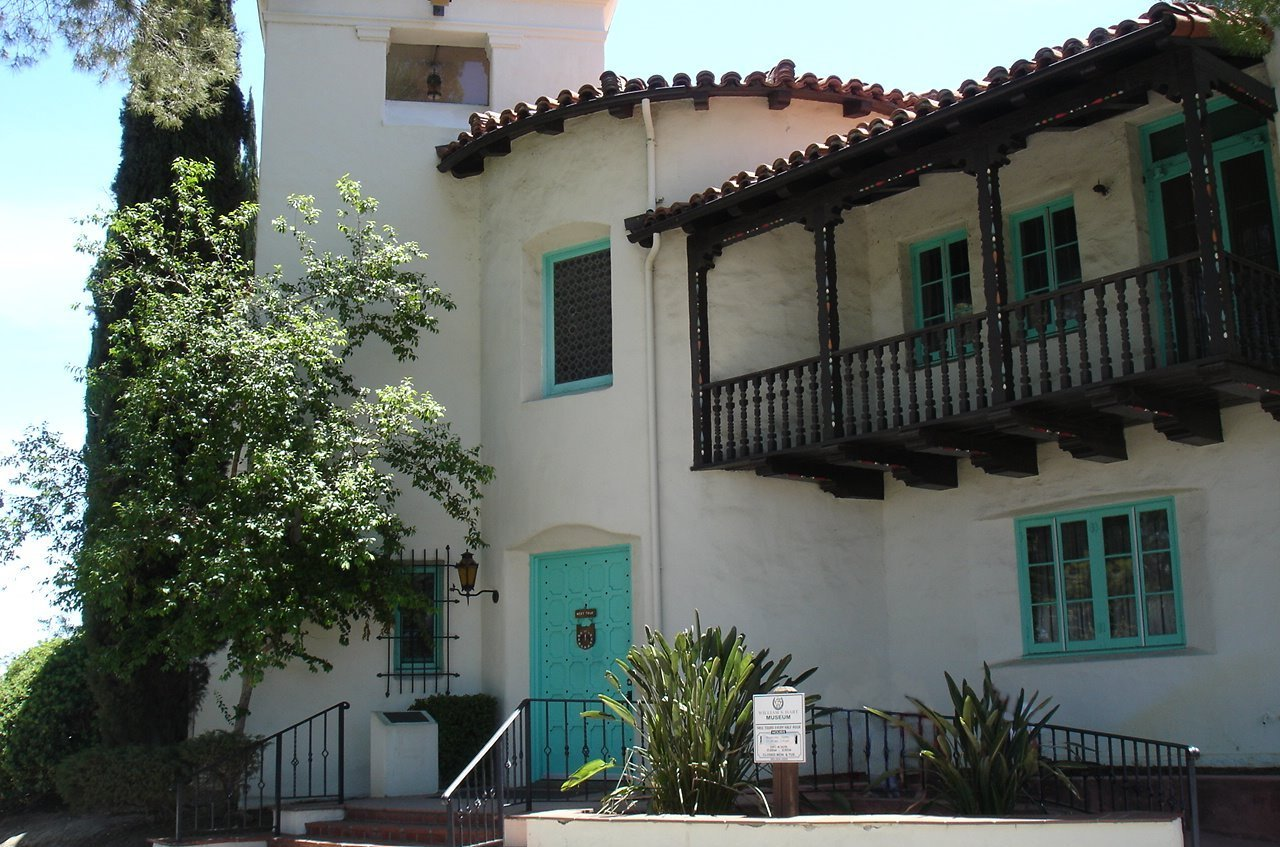
- La Loma de los Vientos, built between 1924 and 1928.

- Location within Santa Clarita
- Location: 24151 Newhall Avenue; Santa Clarita, California 91321
- Coordinates: 34°22′27″N 118°31′38″W
- Area: 265 acres (107 ha)
- Owner: City of Santa Clarita
- Website: hartpark.santaclarita.gov

William S. Hart Regional Park, colloquially called Hart Park, is a 265-acre (107 hectare) city park located within the Newhall neighborhood of Santa Clarita, California, United States.

== History ==
Upon the death of American silent film actor William S. Hart in 1946, he bequeathed his ranch and home to Los Angeles County so that it could be converted into a park and museum.

Since 2015, the park has been home to the Santa Clarita Cowboy Festival and Annual Hart of the West Powwow. The former was previously held at Melody Ranch.

On July 12, 2022, the Los Angeles County Board of Supervisors and City of Santa Clarita entered negotiations in order to transfer ownership of William S. Hart Regional Park and the William S. Hart Museum from the Natural History Museum of Los Angeles County to the City of Santa Clarita.

As of July 14, 2025, the City of Santa Clarita officially assumed ownership of William S. Hart Park and Museum from LA County.

== Attractions ==
- William S. Hart Museum - a satellite of the Natural History Museum of Los Angeles County. The museum features an extensive collection of early 20th century cowboy paraphernalia and indigenous American artifacts.
- Santa Clarita History Center - a history museum and the headquarters of the Santa Clarita Valley Historical Society.
- Mogul Engine 1629 and Caboose - a 2-6-0 steam locomotive and caboose, both formerly operated by Southern Pacific. The locomotive was trucked from Tucson, Arizona to Hart Park in June 1957. The caboose was trucked from nearby Fillmore to Hart Park in December 2021.
- A petting zoo, including a small herd of American bison that can be seen grazing on about 22 acres (8.9 ha) of Hart Park.

=== Historic buildings ===
- La Loma de los Vientos - adobe mansion built between 1924 and 1928. It currently houses the William S. Hart Museum.
- Mitchell Adobe - adobe ranch home built by Thomas Finley Mitchell around 1865. In 1872, his wife Martha Catherine Taylor would go on to teach her children and her neighbors children within the single-room adobe, establishing the first schoolhouse in Santa Clarita Valley. The adobe was relocated to William S. Hart Regional Park in 1989, narrowly avoiding demolition by bulldozer.
- Pardee House - meeting hall of the International Organisation of Good Templars, built by Henry Clay Needham in 1890. Later became the home of pioneer Ed Pardee and his family from 1893 to 1946; a telephone exchange for the Pacific Telephone and Telegraph Company from 1946 to 1969; an after-school activities center of the Boys & Girls Clubs of America from 1969 to 1977; and the seat of the Newhall-Saugus Chamber of Congress from 1977 to 1987. The building was returned to Pacific Bell in 1987 before being purchased by the Santa Clarita Valley Historical Society and relocated to Hart Park in 1992. It currently houses the Santa Clarita History Center.
- Saugus Train Station - train station built by Union Pacific in 1888, originally located at the corner of Drayton Street and Railroad Avenue across from the Saugus Cafe. The station was closed in 1978 and transferred to William S. Hart Regional Park in 1980.

== Events ==
Since 2021, the Education and Cultural Learning Department of the Fernandeño Tataviam Band of Mission Indians government have partnered with the William S. Hart Museum to host the annual Traveling Tataveaveat: Acorn Harvest museum program. The event educates the public on the indigenous history of the Santa Clarita Valley while demonstrating traditional methods of harvesting and processing the acorns of coast live oak into acorn flour.

== See also ==
- Central Park
- Placerita Canyon State Park
