= List of people in Playboy 2000–2009 =

This list of people in Playboy 2000–2009 is a catalog of women and men who appeared in Playboy magazine between the years 2000 and 2009, inclusive. Not all of the people featured on the cover or in the magazine model in the nude.

Entries in blue indicate that the issue marks the original appearance of that year's Playmate of the Year (PMOY).

== 2000 ==
Month	Cover model	Centerfold model	Interview subject	20 Questions	Pictorials
January	Peter Max cover art	Carol Bernaola and Darlene Bernaola	Hugh Hefner	Rupert Everett	Verne Troyer as 'Mini-Hef'
February	Angie Everhart	Suzanne Stokes	Jeff Bezos	Steven Van Zandt	Angie Everhart
March	Caprice Bourret	Nicole Marie Lenz	Jon Stewart	Cindy Margolis	Caprice
April	Bijou Phillips	Brande Roderick	Rowland Evans & Robert Novak	Barry White	Bijou Phillips
May	Sandy Bentley, Mandy Bentley (alternate Canadian cover featured Samantha Speer)	Brooke Berry	Pete Rose	Michael Palin	Sandy and Mandy Bentley
June	Jodi Ann Paterson	Shannon Stewart	Trey Parker & Matt Stone	James Coburn	Carré Otis, Jodi Ann Paterson – PMOY
July	Jaime Bergman	Neferteri Shepherd	George Clooney	Carson Daly	Jaime Bergman
August	Darva Conger	Summer Altice	John Malkovich	Aimee Mann	Darva Conger, Dorothy Stratten
September	Shari Belafonte	Kerissa Fare	Jennifer Lopez	Seth Green	Shari Belafonte, Sherry Lynne White
October	Lauren Michelle Hill	Nichole Van Croft	Bob Costas	Michael Johnson	College Girls of Conference USA
November	Chyna	Buffy Tyler	Ben Stiller	Neil LaBute	Chyna
December	Carmen Electra	Cara Michelle	Drew Barrymore	Jakob Dylan	Carmen Electra

== 2001 ==
Month	Cover model	Centerfold model	Interview subject	20 Questions	Pictorials
January	Gabrielle Reece	Irina Voronina	Gary Johnson	Carol Alt	Gabrielle Reece
February	Anna Nicole Smith	Lauren Michelle Hill	Vince McMahon	Sela Ward	Anna Nicole Smith [reruns and outtakes from June 1993], surfer Amy Cobb
March	Kylie Bax	Miriam Gonzalez	Bobby Knight	Traci Lords	Kylie Bax
April	Irina Voronina	Katie Lohmann	Metallica	Wyclef Jean	
May	Brooke Burke	Crista Nicole	Tom Green	Mariska Hargitay	Brooke Burke, Temptation Island's Lola Corwin
June	Brande Roderick	Heather Spytek	Charlie Sheen	Edward Burns	Brande Roderick – PMOY
July	Pamela Anderson	Kimberley Stanfield	Chris Matthews	Johnny Knoxville	Pamela Anderson, police officer Ginger Harrisson
August	Belinda Carlisle	Jennifer Walcott	Tim Burton	Jon Bon Jovi	Belinda Carlisle
September	Jerri Manthey	Dalene Kurtis	Dale Earnhardt Jr.	Stanley Tucci	Jerri Manthey, Vampirella model Sascha Knopf
October	Julia Schultz, Stephanie Heinrich, Nicole Lenz	Stephanie Heinrich	cast of The West Wing: Martin Sheen, Rob Lowe, Aaron Sorkin, John Wells, Thomas Schlamme, Pat Caddell, John Spencer, Bradley Whitford, Janel Moloney, Allison Janney, Richard Schiff and Dulé Hill	Marg Helgenberger	Track athlete Leilani Rios, College Girls of the Southeastern Conference
November	Angelica Bridges	Lindsey Vuolo	Coen Brothers	Will Ferrell	Angelica Bridges
December	Gena Lee Nolin	Shanna Moakler	Will Smith	Catherine Bell	Gena Lee Nolin, Bebe Buell

== 2002 ==
Month	Cover model	Centerfold model	Interview subject	20 Questions	Pictorials
January	Chyna	Nicole Narain	Brit Hume	Dan Patrick	Joanie Laurer
February	Dedee Pfeiffer	Anka Romensky	Gary Hart	Hugh Jackman	Dedee Pfeiffer
March	Kira Kener, Dasha, Tera Patrick	Tina Marie Jordan	Allen Iverson	Jamie Foxx	boxer Amy Hayes
April	Tiffany	Heather Carolin	Lennox Lewis	Sarah Silverman	Tiffany
May	Kiana Tom	Christi Shake	Bill O'Reilly	Milla Jovovich	Kiana Tom
June	Dalene Kurtis	Michele Rogers	Curt Schilling	Oscar De La Hoya	Dalene Kurtis – PMOY
July	Shallan Meiers, Christina Santiago, Lauren Anderson	Lauren Anderson	Fred Durst	Chris Isaak	Adriana Karembeu
August	Christine Nielsen	Christina Santiago	Harrison Ford	Amanda Peet	Rosie and Renee Tenison
September	Jordan	Shallan Meiers	Larry Ellison	Lenny Kravitz	Jordan, Anita Marks
October	Teri Marie Harrison	Teri Marie Harrison	Al Michaels	Jamie Oliver	College Girls of the Big 12
November	Kristy Swanson	Serria Tawan	Willie Nelson	Marshall Faulk	Kristy Swanson
December	Dita Von Teese	Lani Todd	Denzel Washington	Greg Kinnear	Dita Von Teese

== 2003 ==
Month	Cover model	Centerfold model	Interview subject	20 Questions	Pictorials
January	Tia Carrere	Rebecca Anne Ramos	Halle Berry	Ron Insana	Tia Carrere
February	Alison Eastwood	Charis Boyle	Jimmy Kimmel	Bernie Mac	Allison Eastwood, Tila Tequila
March	Dorismar	Pennelope Jimenez	Colin Farrell	Juliette Lewis	spy Katrina Barellova
April	Carmen Electra	Carmella DeCesare	Jay-Z	Andy Richter	Carmen Electra
May	Torrie Wilson	Laurie Fetter	Billy Bob Thornton	Jorja Fox	Torrie Wilson
June	Sarah Kozer	Tailor James	Mike Piazza	Nelly	Sarah Kozer, PMOY Christina Santiago
July	Nikki Ziering	Markéta Jánská	Lisa Marie Presley	Rachel Weisz	Nikki Ziering
August	Jenna Morasca, Heidi Strobel	Colleen Marie	Tobey Maguire	Charles Rangel	Jenna Morasca and Heidi Strobel, Carnie Wilson
September	Signe Nordli	Luci Victoria	Jon Gruden	Nicolas Cage	Jenny Haase, Women of Starbucks
October	Lauren Michelle Hill	Audra Lynn	O. J. Simpson	Joe Rogan	Deanna Merryman, College Girls of the Big Ten
November	Daryl Hannah	Divini Rae	Quentin Tarantino	Bill Murray	Daryl Hannah
December	Shannen Doherty	Deisy Teles and Sarah Teles	John Cusack	William H. Macy	Shannen Doherty

== 2004 ==
Month	Cover model	Centerfold model	Interview subject	20 Questions	Pictorials
January	none	Colleen Shannon	Jack Nicholson	Al Franken	
February	Jaime Pressly	Aliya Wolf	Kiefer Sutherland	Dave Matthews	Jaime Pressly
March	Sable, Torrie Wilson (two alternative covers)	Sandra Hubby	Jim Carrey	William Petersen	Sable, Torrie Wilson
April	Rachel Hunter	Krista Kelly	50 Cent	Kevin Smith	Rachel Hunter
May	Pamela Anderson	Nicole Whitehead	Johnny Depp	Matthew Perry	Pamela Anderson
June	Charisma Carpenter	Hiromi Oshima	Derek Jeter	Jude Law	Charisma Carpenter, PMOY Carmella DeCesare
July	Peta Wilson	Stephanie Glasson	Michael Moore	Christina Applegate	Peta Wilson
August	Eva Herzigova	Pilar Lastra	Matt Damon	Spike Lee	Eva Herzigova
September	Amy Acuff	Scarlett Keegan	Sergey Brin & Larry Page	Terrell Owens	
October	Evelyn Gery	Kimberly Holland	Donald Trump	Jimmy Fallon	
November	Brooke Burke	Cara Zavaleta	Oliver Stone	John Carmack	Brooke Burke, Kari Ann Peniche, College Girls of the Atlantic Coast Conference
December	Denise Richards	Tiffany Fallon	Bernie Mac	Dustin Hoffman	Denise Richards

== 2005 ==
Month	Cover model	Centerfold model	Interview subject	20 Questions	Pictorials
January	Jenny McCarthy	Destiny Davis	Toby Keith	James Caan	Jenny McCarthy
February	Teri Polo	Amber Campisi	Nicole Kidman		Teri Polo
March	Paris Hilton	Jillian Grace	The Rock	Kid Rock	Debbie Gibson
April	Christy Hemme	Courtney Rachel Culkin	Les Moonves	Mena Suvari	Christy Hemme
May	Michelle Baena	Jamie Westenhiser	James Spader	Vitali Klitschko	The Amazing Race's Victoria Fuller
June	Bai Ling	Kara Monaco	Lance Armstrong	Paul Giamatti	Playmate of the Year Tiffany Fallon, Bai Ling
July	Joanna Krupa	Qiana Chase	Owen Wilson	Scarlett Johansson	Joanna Krupa, Karina Lombard
August	Diora Baird	Tamara Witmer	Ewan McGregor	Kate Hudson	Diora Baird
September	Jessica Canseco	Vanessa Hoelsher	Thomas L. Friedman	Kurt Busch	Jessica Canseco
October	Sara Jean Underwood (identified as Sara Jean with Victoria Thornton on the inside of the foldout cover)	Amanda Paige	George Carlin	Ozzy Osbourne	Fiona Horne, College Girls of the Pac-10
November	Holly Madison, Bridget Marquardt & Kendra Wilkinson	Raquel Gibson	Jamie Foxx	Steve Carell	The Girls Next Door, Kelly Monaco
December	Marilyn Monroe	Christine Smith	Pierce Brosnan	Al Pacino	Rachel Veltri

== 2006 ==
Month	Cover model	Centerfold model	Interview subject	20 Questions	Pictorials
January	Lisa Guerrero	Athena Lundberg	Mark Cuban	Kate Beckinsale	Lisa Guerrero
February	Adrianne Curry	Cassandra Lynn	Al Franken	Hugh Laurie	Adrianne Curry
March	Jessica Alba	Monica Leigh	Kanye West	Franz Ferdinand	Willa Ford
April	Candice Michelle	Holley Ann Dorrough	Keanu Reeves	Craig Ferguson	Candice Michelle
May	Alison Waite	Alison Waite	Ozzie Guillén	Rebecca Romijn	Rachel Sterling
June	Kara Monaco	Stephanie Larimore	Shepard Smith	Jason Lee	PMOY – Kara Monaco
July	Vida Guerra	Sara Jean Underwood	Jerry Bruckheimer	Dana White	Vida Guerra
August	Monica Leigh	Nicole Voss	Denis Leary	Luke Wilson	Stacey Dash
September	Kendra Wilkinson, Holly Madison & Bridget Marquardt	Janine Habeck	Michael D. Brown	Eva Longoria	The Girls Next Door, Paris Hilton impersonator Natalie Reid
October	Tamara Witmer	Jordan Monroe	Ludacris	Johnny Knoxville	Christine Dolce, College Girls of the Big 12
November	Mercedes McNab	Sarah Elizabeth	Arianna Huffington	Tenacious D	Mercedes McNab
December	Cindy Margolis	Kia Drayton	Dixie Chicks	Samuel L. Jackson	Cindy Margolis, Danielle O'Hara

== 2007 ==
Month	Cover model	Centerfold model	Interview subject	20 Questions	Pictorials
January	Pamela Anderson	Jayde Nicole	T. Boone Pickens	Ellen Pompeo	Pamela Anderson
February	Tricia Helfer	Heather Rene Smith	Simon Cowell	Bettie Page	Tricia Helfer, Michelle Manhart, Jesse Jane
March	Mariah Carey	Tyran Richard	Jeremy Piven	Mariah Carey	Erica Chevillar
April	Ashley Massaro	Giuliana Marino	Bill Maher	Will Arnett	Ashley Massaro
May	Anna Nicole Smith	Shannon James	Steve Nash	Fergie	Anna Nicole Smith, College Girls of Conference USA
June	Kristine Lefebvre	Brittany Binger	Matt Groening	Don Rickles	PMOY – Sara Jean Underwood, Kristine Lefebvre
July	Amanda Beard	Tiffany Selby	Bruce Willis	Danica Patrick	Amanda Beard
August	Garcelle Beauvais	Tamara Sky	Chris Tucker	Paul Rudd	Garcelle Beauvais-Nilon, Vicki, Sarah, and Rachel Satterfield
September	Amanda Paige	Patrice Hollis	Clive Owen	Jaime Pressly	Christa Campbell
October	Giuliana Marino	Spencer Scott	Keith Olbermann	Ali Larter	Alicia Machado, College Girls of the Southeastern Conference
November	Lindsey Roeper	Lindsay Wagner	Robert Redford	Matt Leinart	Barry Bonds' mistress Kimberly Bell
December	Kim Kardashian	Sasckya Porto	Bill Richardson	Joaquin Phoenix	Kim Kardashian, Leona Rajacic

== 2008 ==
Month	Cover model	Centerfold model	Interview subject	20 Questions	Pictorials
January	Adrianne Curry	Sandra Nilsson	Tina Fey	Helena Bonham Carter	Adrianne Curry
February	Tiffany Fallon	Michelle McLaughlin	Matthew McConaughey	Rachel Bilson	Irish McCalla
March	Kendra Wilkinson, Holly Madison & Bridget Marquardt	Ida Ljungqvist	Garry Kasparov	Charles Barkley	Coco Austin
April	Maria Kanellis	Regina Deutinger	Chad Kroeger	Jenna Fischer	Maria Kanellis
May	Olga Kurbatova	AJ Alexander	Fareed Zakaria	Bob Saget	Women of Russia, Jennifer Leigh
June	Jayde Nicole	Juliette Fretté	Steve Carell	Harvey Levin	Jayde Nicole – PMOY
July	Cindy Margolis	Laura Croft	Drew Pinsky	Lewis Black	Cindy Margolis, Marilyn Monroe
August	Ashley Harkleroad	Kayla Collins	Ben Stiller	Selma Blair	Ashley Harkleroad, Susie Feldman
September	Anna Faris	Valerie Mason	Dana White	Anna Faris	Beauty and the Geek's Amanda Corey
October	Kelly Carrington	Kelly Carrington	Pete Wentz	Kevin Connolly	Kristy Morgan, College Girls of the Big Ten
November	Rachelle Leah	Grace Kim	Daniel Craig	Chelsea Handler	Rachelle Leah
December	Carol Alt	Jennifer and Natalie Jo Campbell	Hugh Jackman	Rosario Dawson	Carol Alt

== 2009 ==
Month	Cover model	Centerfold model	Interview subject	20 Questions	Pictorials
January	Carmen Electra	Dasha Astafieva	Richard Branson	Marston and Cooper Hefner	Carmen Electra
February	Holly Madison, Bridget Marquardt, Kendra Wilkinson	Jessica Burciaga	Hugh Laurie	Josh Holloway	Holly Madison, Bridget Marquardt, Kendra Wilkinson
March	Aubrey O'Day	Jennifer Pershing	Kenny Chesney	Flight of the Conchords	Aubrey O'Day
April	Seth Rogen, Hope Dworaczyk	Hope Dworaczyk	Seth Rogen	Amy Smart	Bettie Page
May	Lisa Rinna	Crystal McCahill	Chuck Palahniuk	Zachary Quinto	Lisa Rinna
June	America Olivo	Candice Cassidy	Shia LaBeouf	Scott Boras	America Olivo, PMOY – Ida Ljungqvist
July/August Double Issue	Olivia Munn	July Karissa Shannon and Aug. Kristina Shannon	Alec Baldwin	Judd Apatow	Olivia Munn
September	Heidi Montag	Kimberly Phillips	Seth MacFarlane	Diane Kruger	Heidi Montag, Michelle More & Suzanne Stonebarger
October	Kiera Gormley, Tuuli Shipster	Lindsey Gayle Evans	Woody Harrelson	Shawne Merriman	College Girls of the Atlantic Coast Conference
November	Marge Simpson or Alina Puscau	Kelley Thompson	Benicio del Toro	Tracy Morgan	Alina Puscau, Marge Simpson, Farrah Fawcett
December	Chelsea Handler or Joanna Krupa	Crystal Harris	James Cameron	Quinton "Rampage" Jackson	Joanna Krupa, Sasha Grey as Lolita

== See also ==
- List of Playboy Playmates of the Month
- List of people in Playboy 1980–1989
