= Colleen Shannon =

American Playboy Playmate (born 1978)

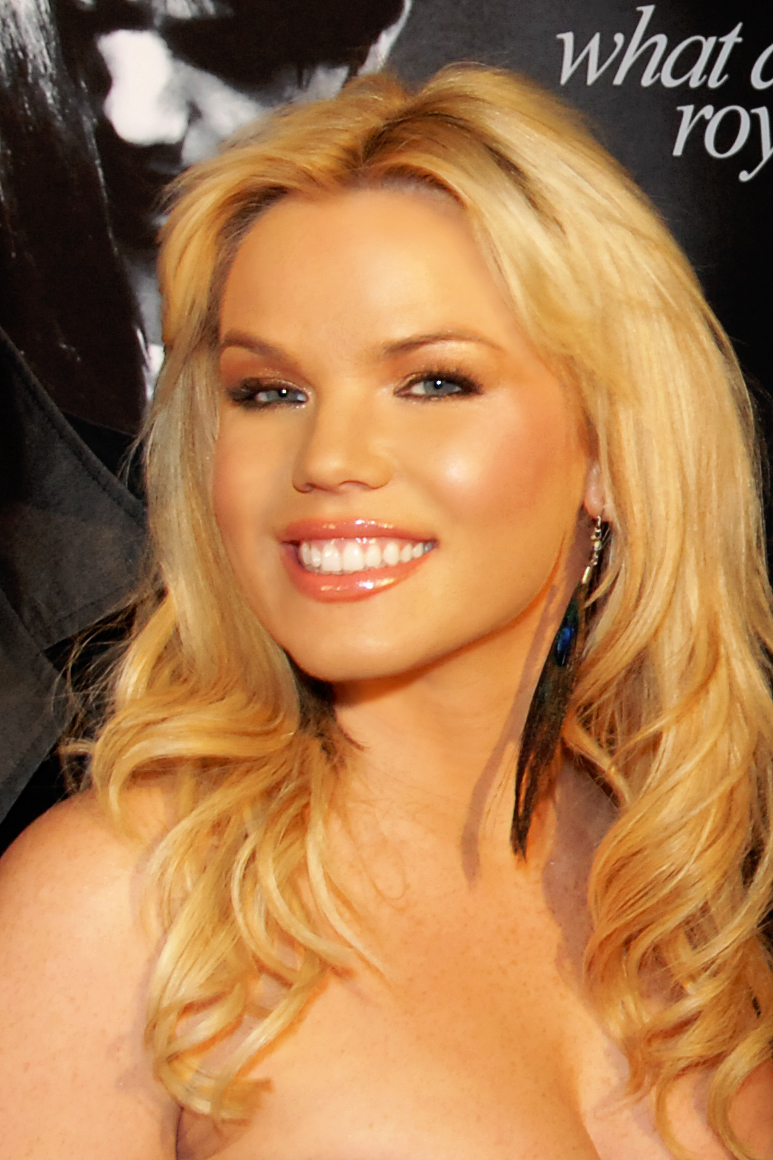
- Shannon in 2008

Playboy centerfold appearance
- January 2004
- Preceded by: Deisy and Sarah Teles
- Succeeded by: Aliya Wolf

Personal details
- Born: April 14, 1978 (age 48) Alaska, U.S.
- Height: 5 ft 2 in (1.57 m)
- Official website

Colleen Shannon (born April 14, 1978) is known as Playboy magazine's Playmate of the Month for January 2004 and the magazine's 50th anniversary Playmate. She is now exclusively managed by Starr Magnet Entertainment Incorporated in Orlando, Florida.

== Early life ==
Shannon was born in Alaska and was raised in Pelican, Alaska. She attended high school in California.

== Career ==
Shannon was Playboy's 50th Anniversary Playmate in 2004. She also was featured in Playboy videos.

Shannon is a disc jockey and has performed with Snoop Dogg, Paul Oakenfold, and Funkmaster Flex. She has DJ'd at Harrah's Atlantic City, the Seminole Hard Rock Hotel and Casino Tampa, and LG Fashion Week. Shannon has also performed internationally in Lebanon, Abu Dhabi, Sweden, Mexico, South Africa and elsewhere.

She has appeared on How I Met Your Mother and in Miss Cast Away and the Island Girls. She has also been featured in OK!, Maxim, and Loaded.

== Legal issues ==
Shannon was arrested in August 2012 for smuggling her Canadian boyfriend, Robert Skojo, into the United States. He was smuggled over the border at the St. Regis Mohawk Reservation in New York. Shannon and Skojo were arrested at Fort Covington, New York. She pleaded guilty in June 2013 of illegally "transporting an alien". In October 2013, she was sentenced to four months in United States Federal Prison and to pay a $5,000 fine.

== Discography ==
Year	Album	Label	Release date
2010	Red Hot 2010	Sony Music Canada	March 16, 2010
2024	No One Does It Like You Featuring Santiago Cortes - Single	Starr Magnet Entertainment	February 2, 2024
2024	Metaverse - Single	Starr Magnet Entertainment	March 16, 2010

Colleen Shannon	Aliya Wolf	Sandra Hubby	Krista Kelly	Nicole Whitehead	Hiromi Oshima
Stephanie Glasson	Pilar Lastra	Scarlett Keegan	Kimberly Holland	Cara Zavaleta	Tiffany Fallon
