= Hiromi Oshima =

Japanese glamour model

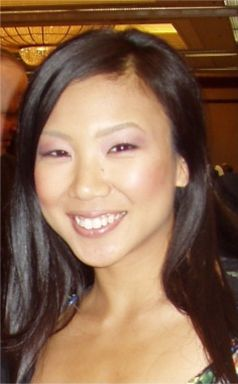

Playboy centerfold appearance
- June 2004
- Preceded by: Nicole Whitehead
- Succeeded by: Stephanie Glasson

Personal details
- Born: January 6, 1980 (age 46) Tokyo, Japan
- Height: 5 ft 4 in (1.63 m)
- Official website

Hiromi Oshima (大島 浩美, オオシマ・ヒロミ, Ōshima Hiromi) is a Japanese glamour model. In June 2004, she became the second Japanese-born Playboy Playmate.

== Career ==
=== Modeling ===
Oshima was relocating to Miami Beach from Playa del Carmen, Mexico where she was living and working. Through a mutual acquaintance, she met Playboy photographer, Jarmo Pohjaniemi. Oshima stated in her Playmate appearance interview, "I could never have been a model in Japan. I would be considered too busty." After her discovery, she was brought to California for a test shoot as a candidate for The 50th Anniversary Playmate Hunt in the December 2003 Playboy, her first magazine appearance was the pictorial of models auditioning.

In addition to her Anniversary Playmate search pictorial, she also made several appearances in other Playboy editions. Oshima was the covergirl of the 2003 Playboy Special Editions Exotic Beauties and she has also starred in a number of Playboy videos.

In June 2004, she became the second Japanese-born Playboy Playmate. The first Japanese-born Playmate was Lieko English who appeared in the June 1971 issue of Playboy.

She appeared in the 2005 Playmates at Play at the Playboy Mansion swimsuit calendar as the January calendar girl. The calendar was the inaugural Playmates at Play calendar and was shot on the grounds of the Playboy Mansion in 2004. It was the magazine's first attempt at creating a non-nude swimsuit calendar featuring Playmates similar in style with those from the Sports Illustrated swimsuit issue. While all Playmates appeared in bikinis in the calendar, only Oshima and Karen McDougal appeared in painted-on bikinis. She has also been listed as a Photo Production Coordinator in various issues of Playboy Special Editions.

=== Appearances ===
Before her Playmate appearance, Oshima appeared in the music video for Nelly's single "Shake Ya Tailfeather". She also appeared in several episodes of The Girls Next Door reality show on the E! network. She was cast as herself in the comedy movie The House Bunny (2008), and was also in the sci-fi movie Race to Witch Mountain (2009). Oshima has also appeared in the television sitcom Community, the Beyoncé-Lady Gaga music video for their single "Telephone", and in 2013, the comedy feature film Dealin' with Idiots and the romantic comedy The Wedding Ringer (2015).

In 2011, Oshima was featured in a print ad/billboard advertising campaign for Virgin America.

In 2017, she was featured in the music video for the song "Little Dark Age" by the rock band MGMT.

== Personal life ==
Oshima was born and raised in Tokyo, Japan, then later moved to the United States. She has a degree in Communications and lived in Miami Beach, Florida, before to modeling for Playboy. She is married to New Zealand singer-songwriter Connan Mockasin. The couple have one daughter.

=== Appearances in Playboy Calendars ===
- Playboy's 2005 Playmate Calendar - August 2005
- Playboy's 2006 Playmate Calendar - July 2006

== See also ==
- List of people in Playboy 2000–2009

| Colleen Shannon | Aliya Wolf | Sandra Hubby | Krista Kelly | Nicole Whitehead | Hiromi Oshima |
| Stephanie Glasson | Pilar Lastra | Scarlett Keegan | Kimberly Holland | Cara Zavaleta | Tiffany Fallon |
