= Shallan Meiers =

American model and actress (born 1981)

Playboy centerfold appearance
- September 2002
- Preceded by: Christina Santiago
- Succeeded by: Teri Harrison

Personal details
- Born: September 30, 1981 (age 43); San Diego, California
- Height: 5 ft 10 in (1.78 m)

Shallan Meiers (born September 30, 1981) is an American model and actress. She was born in San Diego, California.

She was chosen as Playboy's Playmate of the Month for September, 2002 after appearing on the TV special Who Wants to Be a Playboy Centerfold?, that was broadcast on Fox in May 2002. Meiers was a second runner-up, losing to Lauren Anderson and Christina Santiago. All three would eventually become Playmates.

Nicole Narain	Anka Romensky	Tina Marie Jordan	Heather Carolin	Christi Shake	Michele Rogers
Lauren Anderson	Christina Santiago	Shallan Meiers	Teri Harrison	Serria Tawan	Lani Todd
