= Michelle Rogers =

Michelle Rogers may refer to:

- Michelle Rogers (judoka) (born 1976), British judoka
- Michele Rogers, American model and actress
