= Katie Lohmann =

American model (born 1981)

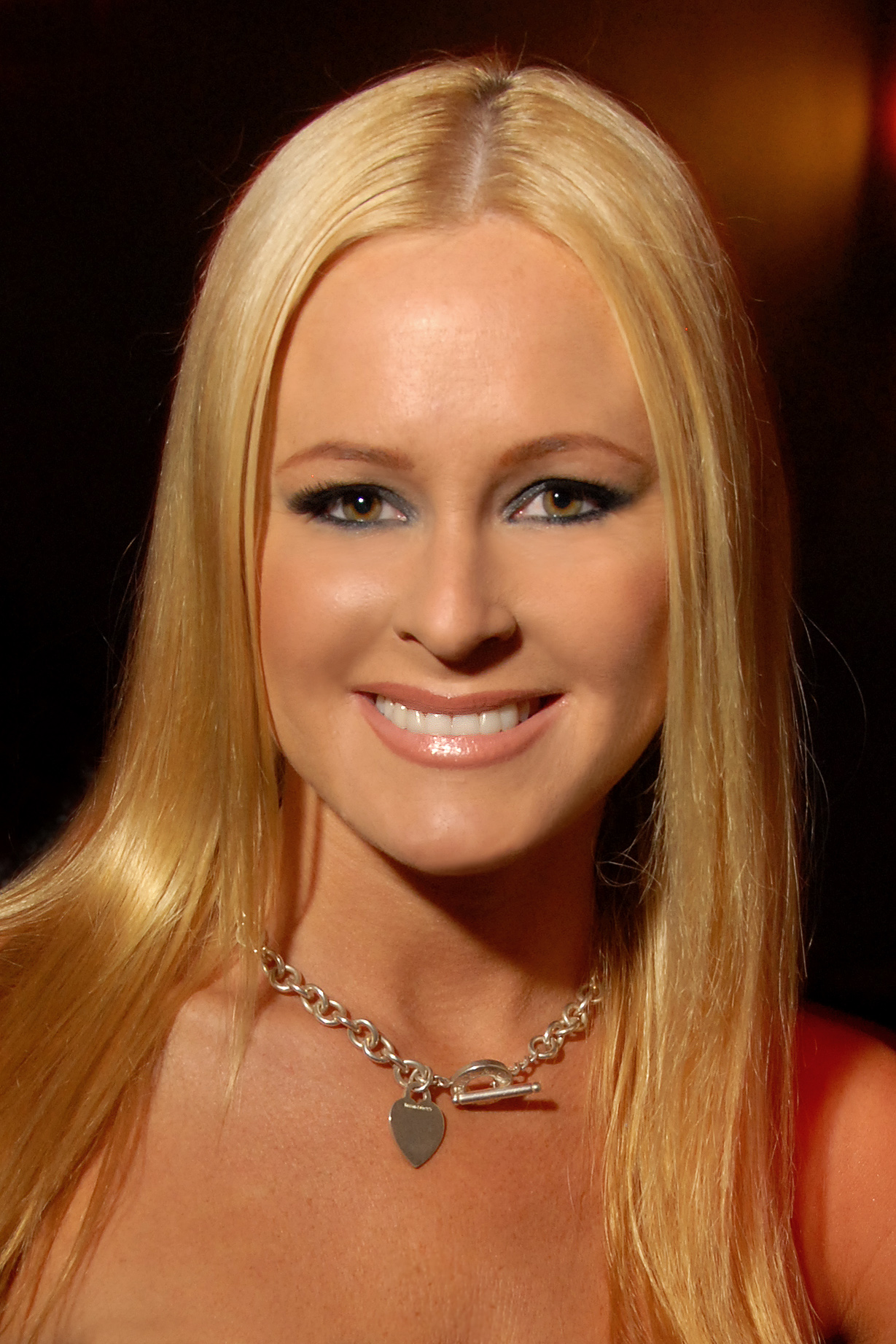
- Lohmann in 2009

Playboy centerfold appearance
- April 2001
- Preceded by: Miriam Gonzalez
- Succeeded by: Crista Nicole

Personal details
- Born: January 29, 1980 (age 46) Scottsdale, Arizona, U.S.
- Height: 5 ft 4 in (1.63 m)

Katie Lohmann (born January 29, 1980) is an American model and actress. She was the Playmate for the Month in April 2001. She was a girlfriend of Hugh Hefner from early 2000 to late 2001.

Her first appearance in Playboy was in the Playmate 2000 search pictorial, published in the December 1999 issue. In that pictorial, she was described as a 19-year-old massage therapist. She is a Scientologist.

In November 2006, Lohmann was part of a trio of Playmates (along with Tina Marie Jordan and Karen McDougal) who appeared in the Celebrity Playmate Gift Guide pictorial of Splat, a paintball enthusiasts magazine. The pictorial showcased new paintball products for the 2006 holiday season.

Lohmann appeared as Hardbody of the Month in Iron Man several times, including a pictorial together with frequent collaborator Karen McDougal in the November 2009 issue.

== Filmography ==
- 2012 – The Deceit
- 2010 – Dahmer vs. Gacy
- 2007 – Strike
- 2006 – Room 6
- 2003 – Dorm Daze
- 2003 – The Mummy's Kiss
- 2002 – The Hot Chick
- 2001 – Tomcats

Irina Voronina	Lauren Michelle Hill	Miriam Gonzalez	Katie Lohmann	Crista Nicole	Heather Spytek
Kimberley Stanfield	Jennifer Walcott	Dalene Kurtis	Stephanie Heinrich	Lindsey Vuolo	Shanna Moakler
