= Reid Brignac =

American baseball player and coach (born 1986)

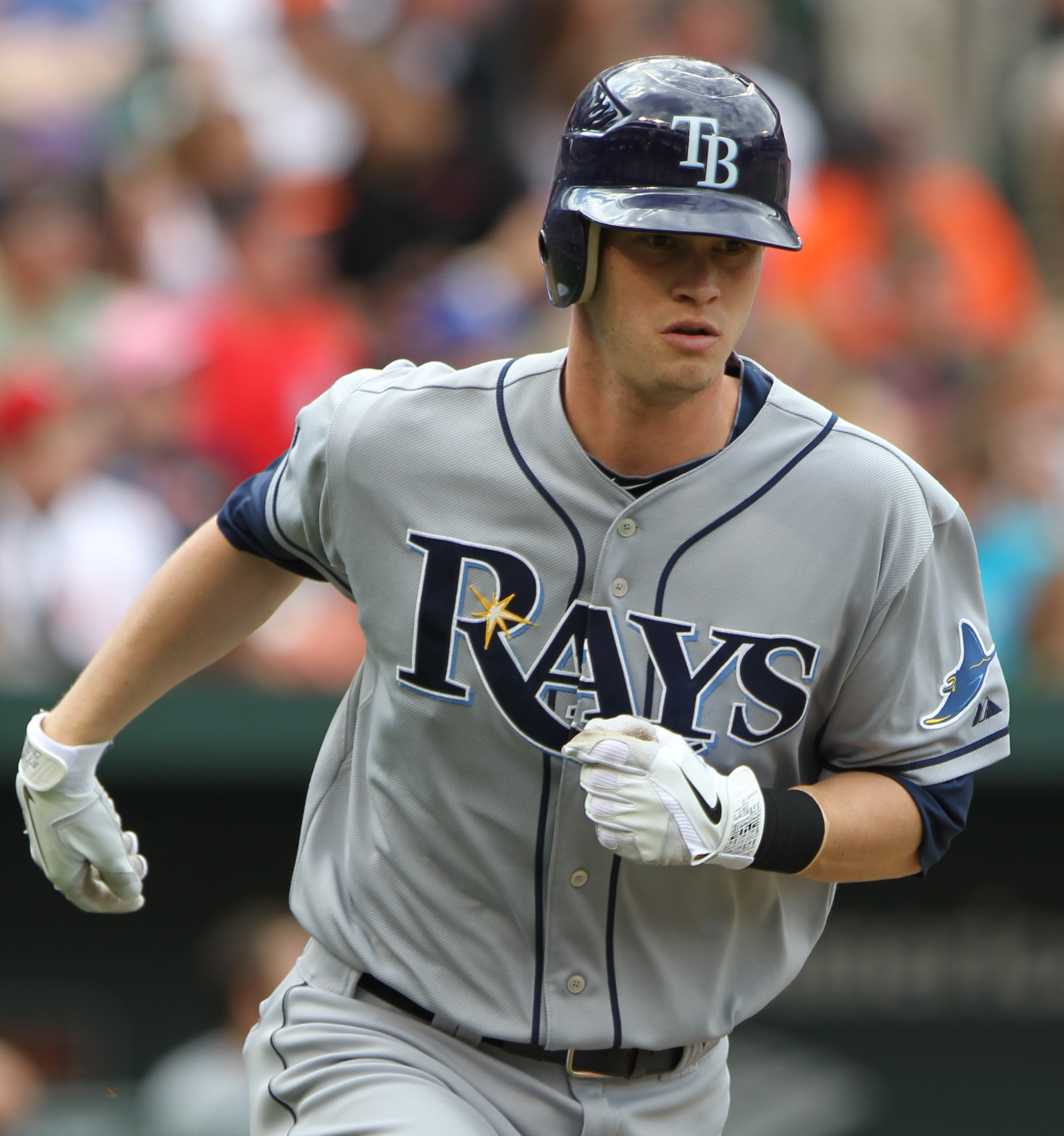
- Brignac with the Tampa Bay Rays
- Infielder
- Born: January 16, 1986 (age 40); St. Amant, Louisiana, U.S.
- Batted: Left Threw: Right

MLB debut
- July 4, 2008, for the Tampa Bay Rays

Last MLB appearance
- May 26, 2016, for the Atlanta Braves

Career statistics
- Batting average: .219
- Home runs: 12
- Runs batted in: 84
- Stats at Baseball Reference

Teams
- Tampa Bay Rays (2008–2012); Colorado Rockies (2013); New York Yankees (2013); Philadelphia Phillies (2014); Miami Marlins (2015); Atlanta Braves (2016)

Reid Michael Brignac (pronounced Brin-yack) (born January 16, 1986) is an American former professional baseball infielder and current coach. He played in Major League Baseball (MLB) for the Tampa Bay Rays, Colorado Rockies, New York Yankees, Philadelphia Phillies, Miami Marlins, and Atlanta Braves. He currently serves as an assistant manager for the Durham Bulls.

== Amateur career ==
Brignac attended St. Amant High School in Louisiana where he played baseball and football and earned a 3.5 GPA. Brignac was recruited to play college baseball at Southern Miss and Louisiana before ultimately accepting a scholarship to play at Louisiana State.

== Professional career ==
=== Tampa Bay Rays ===
Brignac was drafted by Tampa Bay Rays in the second round (45th overall) of the 2004 Major League Baseball draft out of St. Amant High School as a shortstop. He made his professional debut on August 4 with Advanced Rookie Princeton, where in 25 games, he hit .361 with a home run and 25 RBI. He also had a 3-game stint with Single-A Charleston, where he went 7-for-14 (.500). Brignac played all of 2005 with Single-A Southwest Michigan, where in 127 games as the Devil Rays shortstop, he hit .264 with 15 home runs, 61 RBI, 77 runs and 39 doubles. He was also the Eastern Division's starting shortstop in the Midwest League All-Star Game. Brignac had a breakout year with High-A Visalia, hitting .326 with 21 home runs, 83 RBI, 82 runs, 26 doubles and a league-leading .939 on-base plus slugging (OPS) in 100 games as the Oaks shortstop. He earned a promotion to Double-A Montgomery for the last month of the season, along with third baseman Evan Longoria, and in 28 games with the Biscuits, he hit .300 with three home runs, 16 RBI and 18 runs. He was a Mid and Post-Season All-Star in the California League, and he was named the League's MVP and Rookie of the Year. Baseball America rated Brignac as the 17th best MLB prospect in 2007 and 39th best in 2008.

Brignac was Montgomery's shortstop for 2007, where in 133 games and a league-leading (with Emilio Bonifacio) 596 plate appearances, he hit .260 with 17 home runs, 81 RBI. He also posted a league-leading 91 runs and 30 doubles. After the year, he played in the Arizona Fall League with Scottsdale, where he hit .177 (20–113) with two home runs and 6 RBI in 26 games. Brignac began 2008 with Triple-A Durham as their shortstop, where he was hitting .265 with seven home runs and 38 RBI through the first 3 months.

Brignac was called up from the minors on July 3, 2008, after Jason Bartlett was placed on the 15-day disabled list. He made his major league debut on July 4, 2008. He was optioned back to Durham on July 15, 2008, having gone hitless in his first 10 major league at-bats with 1 walk and 5 strikeouts over 4 games. On August 6 in a game against Richmond, he was hit by a pitch on the wrist from Jo-Jo Reyes, and left the game after the third inning. He would miss the rest of the season, and a possible September call-up, because of the injury. In 97 games with Durham in 2008, he hit .250 with nine home runs, 43 RBI, 43 runs and 26 doubles.

Brignac began 2009 as Durham's shortstop, where he was hitting .291 in the first month and a half before he earned a promotion to Tampa Bay on May 22. He got his first career hit, a single, that day off Renyel Pinto of Florida. He was optioned to Durham when Bartlett returned from the disabled list on June 15. In his 21-game stint, he hit .271 with 2 RBI. After a 4-day, 1-game stint back in Tampa in mid-August, he returned on September 3 after the rosters had expanded. On September 14, 2009, Brignac hit his first major league home run off of David Hernandez of the Baltimore Orioles. He finished the game 4-for-4 with three RBIs, a run, a stolen base and a triple shy of hitting for the cycle. In 31 games with the Rays in 2009, he hit .278 with a home run, 6 RBI and 10 runs.

Brignac made the Opening Day roster in 2010 with Tampa Bay as a second baseman and backup shortstop, and stayed there for the whole season. In 113 games in 2010, he hit .256 with eight home runs and 45 RBI. On September 13, Brignac hit a walk-off home run off Sergio Mitre of the Yankees, putting the Rays in first place in the division, half a game ahead of the Yankees. The Rays ultimately won the AL East that year, finishing one game ahead of New York.

Brignac was the Rays Opening Day shortstop in 2011, and he split time there with Elliot Johnson. He hit 14-for-63 (.222) in April, 4-for-41 (.098) in May, 11-for-56 (.196) in June and 7-for-27 (.259) in July before being demoted to Durham on July 22, 2011, to make space for Rays prospect Desmond Jennings, and Sean Rodriguez became the starting shortstop. Manager Joe Maddon said:

There's no question Reid is a Major League caliber shortstop. And I don't like the idea of him not playing defense for us. But moving down the road we have to get better on the offensive side of the ball.

At the time of his demotion, Brignac was hitting .193 with a home run and 10 RBI in 68 games. After an 11-game stint in Durham, he was recalled on August 10 after outfielder Justin Ruggiano was placed on the disabled list. Brignac finished the year with Tampa Bay. In 96 games with the Rays, he hit .193 with a home run and 15 RBI.

Brignac began 2012 splitting time with Rodriguez at shortstop, but after hitting .118 in 8 games with the Rays, he was optioned to Durham in favor of Brandon Allen. Rodriguez was awarded the starting shortstop job, although he eventually relinquished to Johnson and subsequently Ben Zobrist. Brignac spent the next 4 months at Durham, where in 99 games, he hit .231 with eight home runs and 46 RBI.

He was designated for assignment on February 5, 2013.

=== Colorado Rockies ===
Brignac was traded to the Colorado Rockies in exchange for cash considerations on February 14, 2013. Brignac made the Opening Day roster as a backup infielder, and had a pinch-hit single in his Rockies debut. He hit 9-for-35 (.257) in April and was hitting 3-for-13 (.231) in May before he was designated for assignment on May 16. In 29 games with Colorado, Brignac hit .250 with a home run and 6 RBI.

=== New York Yankees ===
Brignac was traded to the New York Yankees for cash considerations on May 18, 2013. He split time with Jayson Nix at shortstop before he was designated for assignment on June 21, 2013. He was released a few days thereafter. In 17 games with New York, he hit .114 with 1 double.

=== Colorado Rockies (second stint) ===
Brignac signed a minor league contract with the Colorado Rockies on June 26, 2013. He was assigned to the Triple-A Colorado Springs Sky Sox, where in 48 games all over the infield, he hit .230 with two home runs and 11 RBI. After the season, Brignac became a minor league free agent following the season.

=== Philadelphia Phillies ===
On November 19, 2013, Brignac signed a minor league deal with the Philadelphia Phillies that included an invitation to spring training. The Phillies selected his contract from the Triple-A Lehigh Valley IronPigs on May 9, 2014.

On June 11, 2014, Brignac hit a walk-off home run off Padres reliever Nick Vincent for his first home run as a Phillie.

Shortly after, Brignac was placed on the disabled list (on June 20) with a high ankle sprain. Before heading to the DL, Brignac hit .258/.329/.409 with five doubles, one triple, one home run, 10 RBI, seven walks, 24 strikeouts and one stolen base in 66 at-bats.

The Phillies designated Brignac for assignment on August 23, 2014. He elected free agency in October 2014.

=== Miami Marlins ===
Brignac signed a minor league contract with Miami Marlins for the 2015 season. After recording only one hit through 17 plate appearances, the Marlins designated him for assignment on May 8.

=== Atlanta Braves ===
Brignac signed a minor league contract with the Atlanta Braves on November 24, 2015. He was designated for assignment on May 27, 2016.

=== Houston Astros ===
On December 9, 2016, Brignac signed a minor league contract with the Houston Astros organization. During his tenure with the Astros, Brignac began experimenting as a switch hitter in an effort to prolong his career in the majors. He played in 110 games for the Triple–A Fresno Grizzlies, hitting .251/.326/.411 with 13 home runs and 52 RBI. Brignac elected free agency following the season on November 6, 2017.

=== Washington Nationals ===
On January 29, 2018, Brignac signed a minor league contract with the Washington Nationals. Brignac was released March 24, near the end of spring training.

=== New Britain Bees ===
On April 21, 2018, Brignac signed with the New Britain Bees of the Atlantic League of Professional Baseball. Brignac announced his retirement from professional baseball, following his final game as a Bee, on July 6, 2018, in which he went 2-for-4 with a stolen base and two RBI. In total he played in 61 games for New Britain, hitting .296/.364/.382 with one home run, 23 RBI, and four stolen bases.

== Post-playing career ==
=== New York Mets ===
On January 7, 2020, Brignac was named manager of the Columbia Fireflies, the Single-A affiliate of the New York Mets. On March 8, 2021, Brignac was announced as the new manager for the St. Lucie Mets, New York's Low-A affiliate.

On January 6, 2022, Brignac was named manager of the Binghamton Rumble Ponies, a Double-A affiliate of the New York Mets. Following the 2025 season, in which the Rumble Ponies won the Eastern League championship, Brignac won the Manager of the Year award.

=== Tampa Bay Rays ===
On December 7, 2025, Brignac was hired to serve as an assistant coach for the Durham Bulls, the Triple-A affiliate of the Tampa Bay Rays.

== Personal life ==
Since 2010, Brignac is married to Playboy Playmate Miss July 2002, Lauren Anderson. They have two children together.

Brignac is Cajun.
