= Tina Marie Jordan =

American glamour model and actress (born 1972)

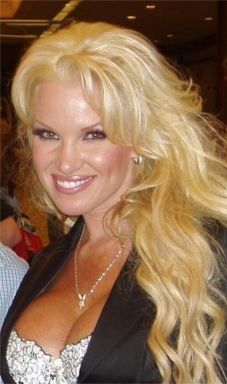

Playboy centerfold appearance
- March 2002
- Preceded by: Anka Romensky
- Succeeded by: Heather Carolin

Personal details
- Born: August 21, 1972 (age 54) North Hollywood, Los Angeles, California
- Height: 5 ft 5 in (1.65 m)

Tina Marie Jordan (born August 21, 1972) is an American glamour model and actress. Jordan is the Playmate of the Month for March 2002 and a former girlfriend of Hugh Hefner. She was the main girlfriend of Hugh Hefner from late 2001 to late 2002.

== Career ==
She tried many career paths, including college, business school, and cosmetology school, and was working as a loan processor and trying to get her real estate license when she met Playboy publisher Hugh Hefner. They became romantically involved, and she moved into Hefner's Playboy Mansion, before appearing as Playmate of the Month for March 2002.

=== Appearances ===
Jordan has made numerous appearances on The Howard Stern Show, before and after she was a Playmate. She has appeared in several Playboy videos since her appearance as a Playmate.

Since September 1, 2004, Jordan co-hosted the radio show Two Chicks and a Bunny. The show aired on Los Angeles radio station KLSX 97.1. It was announced in 2006 that Jordan would be on Season 7 of The Surreal Life.

In November 2006, Jordan was part of a trio of Playmates (along with Karen McDougal and Katie Lohmann) that appeared in the "Celebrity Playmate Gift Guide" pictorial of Splat magazine, a paintball enthusiasts magazine. The pictorial showcased new paintball products for the 2006 holiday season.

She was also one of the models in the PC game Street Racing Syndicate.

== Personal life ==
Jordan grew up in Los Angeles with seven sisters and two brothers. She has a daughter from a prior relationship who was three years old at the time of her centerfold appearance.

Nicole Narain	Anka Romensky	Tina Marie Jordan	Heather Carolin	Christi Shake	Michele Rogers
Lauren Anderson	Christina Santiago	Shallan Meiers	Teri Harrison	Serria Tawan	Lani Todd
