= Lindsey Vuolo =

American glamour model and actress (born 1981)

Lindsey Vuolo Handrinos

Playboy centerfold appearance
- November 2001
- Preceded by: Stephanie Heinrich
- Succeeded by: Shanna Moakler

Personal details
- Born: October 19, 1981 (age 45) Princeton, New Jersey
- Height: 5 ft 8 in (1.73 m)

Lindsey Eve (Vuolo) Handrinos (born October 19, 1981) is an American glamour model and actress best known for her appearance in Playboy as the November 2001 Playmate of the Month. She has appeared in a number of Playboy Special Editions, and in Playboy videos. She also appeared on TV shows such as The Girls Next Door and The Celebrity Apprentice.

== Early life ==
Vuolo's family was Jewish from Hungary and Italy. She was a Communications major at Indiana University of Pennsylvania. In 1999 she went on a two-week exchange program in Israel, and describes her experience at the Western Wall as a profoundly emotional and transformative one for her.

== Career ==
Prior to her posing for Playboy, Vuolo had been working two jobs as a cocktail waitress to pay for college when a friend and coworker suggested sending in photos to the magazine. Despite Vuolo's belief that she was not "Playboy material", Vuolo, whose only modeling experience at that point was posing for a local swimsuit calendar, eventually told her coworker that she could send in photos of her if she wanted. After Playboy contacted Vuolo in early 2001, she flew to Los Angeles without telling her parents. She was photographed at the magazine's Santa Monica studios while sharing a bedroom at the Playboy Mansion with Christi Shake, Playboy's Miss May 2002 and one of Hugh Hefner's seven girlfriends at the time. After returning home and informing her mother of her recent activities, Hefner invited her back to the mansion for his 75th birthday party that April.

Vuolo's pictorial appeared in the November 2001 issue of Playboy. Some have incorrectly claimed that Vuolo is the first Jewish Playmate. Vuolo herself has agreed it is more likely that she merely is the first openly Jewish Playmate. Photos of her 1994 bat mitzvah ceremony at age 13 were included in her pictorial. The fact that she attended synagogue while she was active with Playboy led to a fair amount of media attention, including an interview with columnist Shmuley Boteach, who criticized Vuolo for her pictorial, and argued that she was exploited by Playboy, and that it and pornography in general dehumanizes women, and could lead to things like rape and spousal violence. Boteach paralleled the effects of pornography on men's perception of women with American slavery and The Holocaust. Vuolo challenged this view, saying that Playboy is not pornography, and that her experience with the magazine was one of expansion of her career opportunities, and not exploitation. Vuolo's membership in her college sorority was also revoked as a result of her pictorial.

Vuolo has starred in several Playboy features and was a recurring model for several years in Playboy's special edition magazines, such as Voluptuous Vixens. She was also photographed by Howard Stern's sidekick Artie Lange for a nude pictorial in the "Celebrity Photographer" section of their website.

In late 2006 Vuolo guest-starred in two episodes of the second season of the E! reality television series The Girls Next Door, which chronicled life at the Playboy Mansion for three of Hefner's girlfriends. Vuolo appeared in the seventh episode that season, "Sleepwear Optional", in which she was one of the invited guests at a slumber party thrown by Holly Madison, Bridget Marquardt and Kendra Wilkinson, and in the eleventh episode, "The 21 Club", in which Vuolo was one of Wilkinson's Playmate friends who took a bus with her to Las Vegas, where Wilkinson celebrated her 21st birthday.

Vuolo appeared in the second-season premiere of The Celebrity Apprentice, which aired March 1, 2009. In the episode, Brande Roderick, a former Playboy Playmate herself, and a member of that season's all-female team, Athena, enlisted Playboy employees at the magazine's Manhattan headquarters to help her team sell cupcakes. Vuolo appeared in a red Playboy bunny outfit in order to assist in the effort.

== Personal life ==
Vuolo herself says she is a practicing Jew, who observes the High Holy Days. She considers herself to be a practitioner of Conservative Judaism. At the time of her interview with Rabbi Boteach, she was single, and had never dated a non-Jewish man, saying she would prefer not to do so. She later stated in a lifestylemagazine.com interview that she would not marry a non-Jew, saying, "I'm terrified that once my maternal grandfather passes away, no one will know how to recite the Passover Haggadah. It's very important for me to marry someone who can do that, and that my children know how too."

Vuolo does not drink or smoke.

Vuolo married Jason Handrinos in Athens, Greece in 2013.

== Filmography ==
- The Weekend (2007)
- Playmates in Bed
- Playboy Video Playmate Calendar 2003
- Playmates Unwrapped

Irina Voronina	Lauren Michelle Hill	Miriam Gonzalez	Katie Lohmann	Crista Nicole	Heather Spytek
Kimberley Stanfield	Jennifer Walcott	Dalene Kurtis	Stephanie Heinrich	Lindsey Vuolo	Shanna Moakler
