= Audra Lynn =

American model and actress (born 1980)

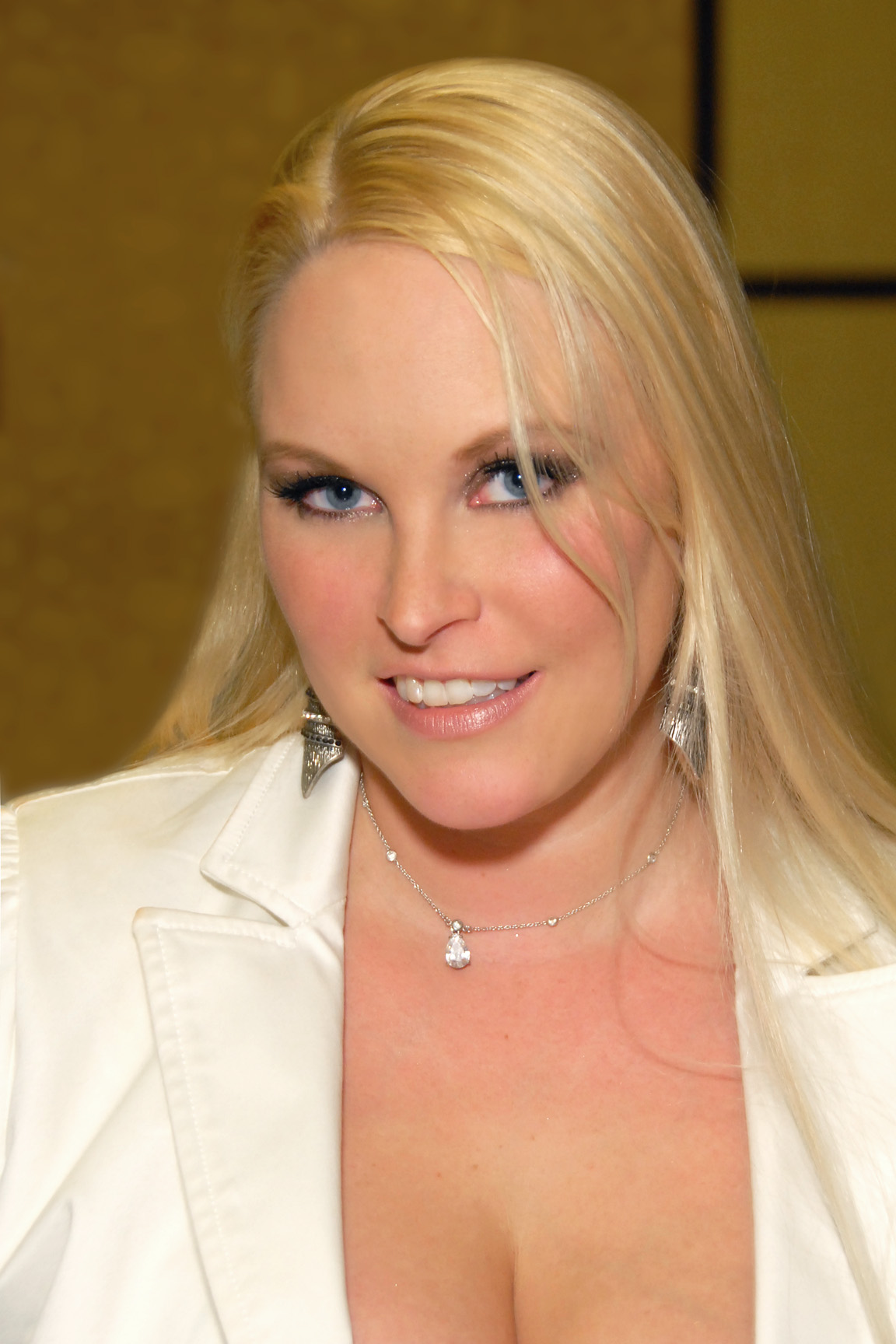
- Lynn in Los Angeles, October 2011
- Born: January 31, 1980 (age 45); Albert Lea, Minnesota, U.S.
- Occupation(s): model, actress
Playboy centerfold appearance
- October 2003
- Preceded by: Luci Victoria
- Succeeded by: Divini Rae
Personal details
- Height: 5 ft 8 in (1.73 m)

Audra Lynn (born Audra Lynn January 31, 1980) is an American model and actress. She was Playboy magazine's Miss October 2003.

She also was on the cover of the March 2005 issue of the Italian edition of Rolling Stone magazine.

She appeared in an episode of Viva La Bam on MTV. She also appeared in several episodes of the E! reality television series, The Girls Next Door. She was a special guest on Frasier in the "Freudian Sleep" episode. She has also been on Mad TV, a celebrity week of Family Feud, won a game of Street Smarts for charity, was mentioned by Sum 41 on MTV's Total Request Live due to a shoot that Sum 41 did of her, was on Jimmy Kimmel Live!, Carson Daly, Late Show with David Letterman, The Tonight Show with Jay Leno, and Spring Break MTV 2003.

Lynn was photographed nude by Sum 41 for the celebrity photographer section of Playboy.com. Her Playmate centerfold was photographed by Stephen Wayda and Arny Freytag.

Lynn was the featured celebrity interview for Amore magazine's 25th Anniversary edition. She spends her time promoting charities including Hollygrove, a child-centered, family-focused community organization serving abused and neglected children and those at risk of abuse.

In the June 2006 High Times, she discussed her discovery of medical marijuana. It helped ease her chronic pain from fibromyalgia.

| Rebecca Ramos | Charis Boyle | Pennelope Jimenez | Carmella DeCesare | Laurie Fetter | Tailor James |
| Markéta Jánská | Colleen Marie | Luci Victoria | Audra Lynn | Divini Rae | Deisy and Sarah Teles |
