= Serria Tawan =

American model, actress, author (born 1978)

Playboy centerfold appearance
- November 2002
- Preceded by: Teri Harrison
- Succeeded by: Lani Todd

Personal details
- Born: September 4, 1978 (age 46); Chicago, Illinois
- Height: 5 ft 8 in (1.73 m)

Serria Tawan (born September 4, 1978) is an African-American model, actress, and published author.

== Career ==
She was chosen as Playboy's Playmate of the Month in November, 2002 and has appeared in numerous Playboy videos. She guest-starred on a special Playmates vs. Bachelors edition of Family Feud.

== Author ==
She has published a book with two other playmates titled The Bunny Book: How To Walk, Talk, Tease, and Please Like a Playboy Bunny.

Nicole Narain	Anka Romensky	Tina Marie Jordan	Heather Carolin	Christi Shake	Michele Rogers
Lauren Anderson	Christina Santiago	Shallan Meiers	Teri Harrison	Serria Tawan	Lani Todd
