= Teri Harrison =

American model and actress (born 1981)

Teri Marie Harrison
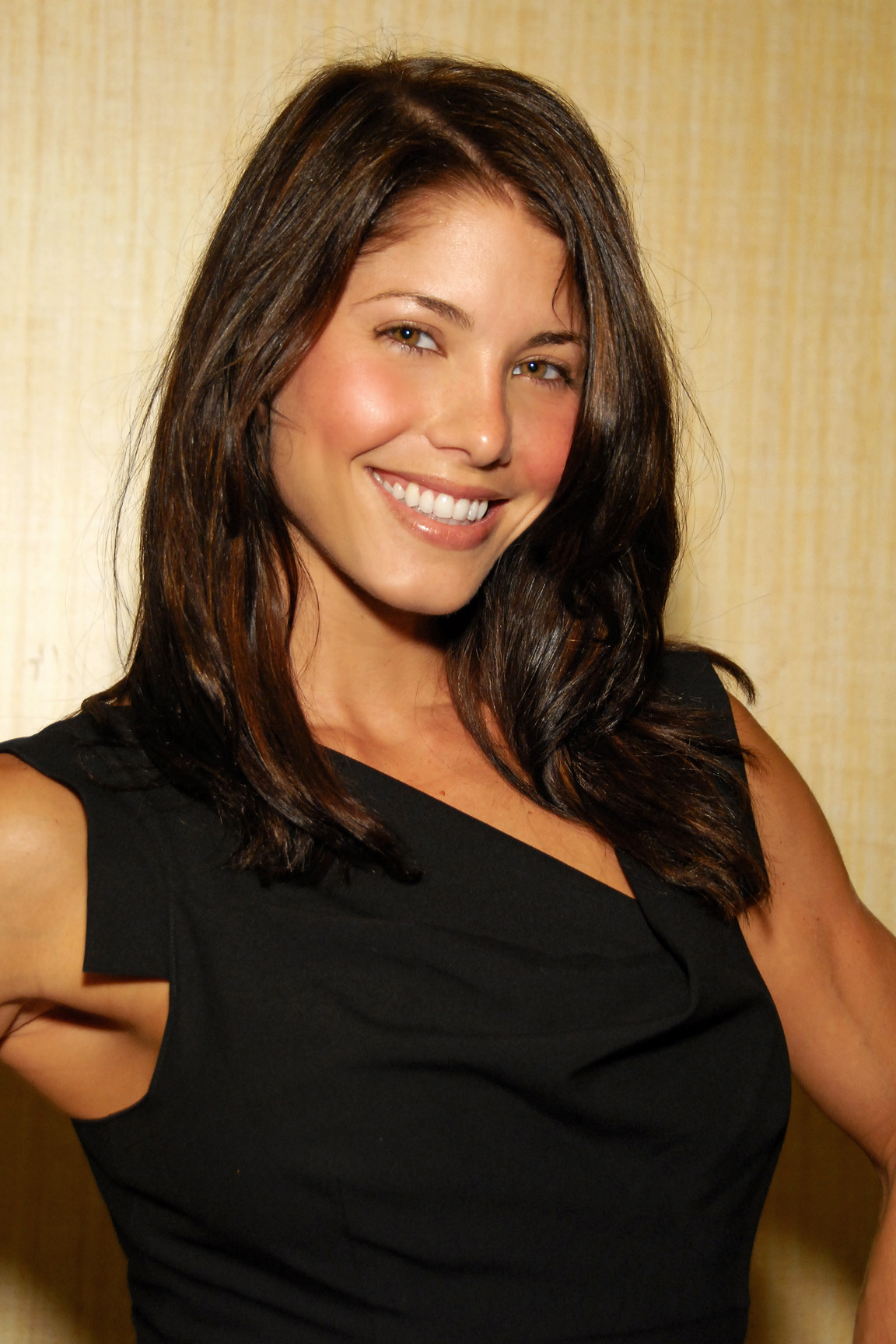
- Teri Harrison, Los Angeles, CA on October 1, 2011

Playboy centerfold appearance
- October 2002
- Preceded by: Shallan Meiers
- Succeeded by: Serria Tawan

Personal details
- Born: February 16, 1981 (age 45) Bradenton, Florida, U.S.
- Height: 5 ft 6 in (1.68 m)
- Official website

Teri Marie Harrison Rose (born February 16, 1981, in Bradenton, Florida, United States) is an American model and actress. A former student of the University of Central Florida, she was Playboy's Playmate of the Month in October 2002. She was photographed by Stephen Wayda. Her involvement with Playboy began when her best friend encouraged her to send pictures of herself to the magazine. Although she was chosen almost immediately as a Playmate, it was a year before she was assigned a month. She was also the German Playboy Playmate of the Month, for January 2003. According to Teri, her father is German and her mother is half-Japanese.

She appeared in the 2005 Playmates at Play at the Playboy Mansion swimsuit calendar as calendar girl of December. The calendar was the inaugural Playmates at Play calendar and it was shot on the grounds of Playboy Mansion in 2004. It was Playboy's first attempt at creating a non-nude swimsuit calendar featuring Playmates similar in style with those from Sports Illustrated Swimsuit Issue.

She was also a Barker's Beauty on The Price Is Right from 2002 to 2005.

She has appeared in radio commercials as a "remarkable mouth" for KDKB and WLZR

Harrison was married to Sevendust drummer Morgan Rose and they have a son together. They have since divorced.

Nicole Narain	Anka Romensky	Tina Marie Jordan	Heather Carolin	Christi Shake	Michele Rogers
Lauren Anderson	Christina Santiago	Shallan Meiers	Teri Harrison	Serria Tawan	Lani Todd
