= List of Playboy Playmates of 2004 =

The following is a list of Playboy Playmates of 2004, the 50th anniversary year of the publication. Playboy magazine names its Playmate of the Month each month throughout the year.

== January ==
Colleen Shannon
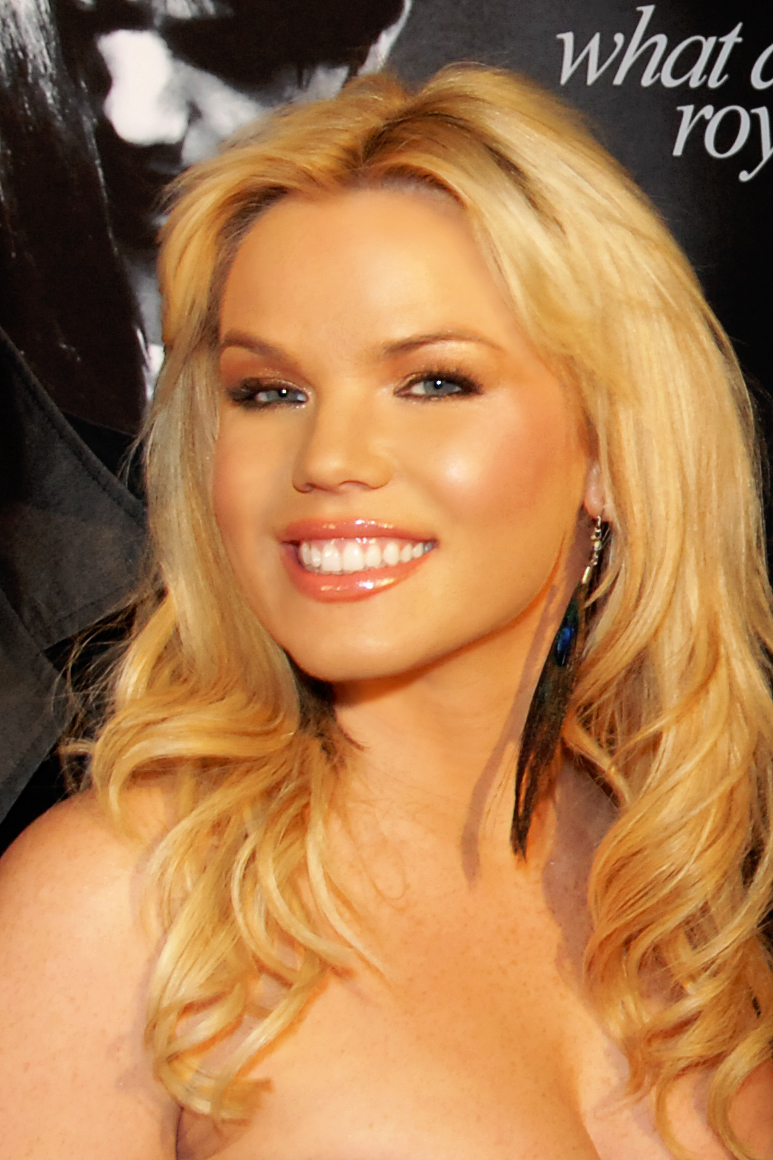
- Shannon in 2008

Personal details
- Born: April 14, 1978 (age 48) Pelican, Alaska, U.S.
- Height: 5 ft 2 in (1.57 m)

Colleen Shannon (born April 14, 1978) is an American DJ and model who is Playboy's Playmate of the Month for January 2004. She is the magazine's 50th anniversary Playmate.

== February ==
Aliya Wolf

Personal details
- Born: January 17, 1975 (age 51) Stephenville, Texas, U.S.
- Height: 5 ft 7 in (1.70 m)

Aliya Wolf (born January 17, 1975, in Stephenville, Texas) is an American model and photographer who is Playboy magazine's Playmate of the Month for February 2004.

A model since she was nineteen, she is a former Miss Houston and Star Search spokesmodel. Wolf tried out for Playboy scouts for the 50th Anniversary Playmate Hunt. She appeared in its pictorial in the December 2003 issue. Wolf lives in Texas, and is married and has children. She rides Harley-Davidsons and maintains horses.

== March ==
Sandra Hubby

Personal details
- Born: November 23, 1978 (age 47) Norton, Ohio, U.S.
- Height: 5 ft 4 in (1.63 m)

Sandra Hubby (born November 23, 1978) is an American model and the March 2004 Playmate of the Month in Playboy magazine. Hubby was born and raised in Ohio, just outside Columbus. She worked on a farm. She is a former contestant in the Miss Hawaiian Tropic pageant representing Columbus. She heard that Playboy was casting models while listening to the radio and went to Cleveland to try out. Hubby appeared in the 2005 Playmates at Play at the Playboy Mansion swimsuit calendar as the April calendar girl.

== April ==
Krista Kelly

Personal details
- Born: June 18, 1977 (age 49) Toronto, Canada
- Height: 5 ft 9.5 in (1.77 m)

Krista Kelly (born June 18, 1977) is a Canadian model. She is Playboy's Playmate of the Month for April 2004.

== May ==
Nicole Whitehead

Personal details
- Born: November 5, 1980 (age 45) Birmingham, Alabama, U.S.
- Height: 5 ft 4 in (1.63 m)

Nicole Whitehead (born November 5, 1980, in Birmingham, Alabama) is an American model. She is Playboy's Playmate of the Month for May 2004. Prior to that, she was Cyber Girl of the Week for January 28, 2002, and then Cyber Girl of the Month for May 2002.

== June ==
Hiromi Oshima
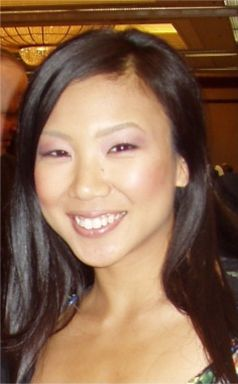

Personal details
- Born: 6 January 1980 (age 46) Tokyo, Japan
- Height: 5 ft 4 in (1.63 m)

Hiromi Oshima (大島 浩美, オオシマ・ヒロミ, Ōshima Hiromi; born on 6 January 1980 in Tokyo) is a Japanese model, in June 2004 she became the second Japanese to be featured as a Playboy Playmate of the month.

Oshima lives in Los Angeles, where she now works as a professional photo stylist and actively pursues her passion for dance as a Playmate Dancer. "I never dance sexy when I go out, but on stage, it's liberating", she once explained. "In fact, I feel much sexier when I’m performing with the Playmate Dancers."

== July ==
Stephanie Glasson
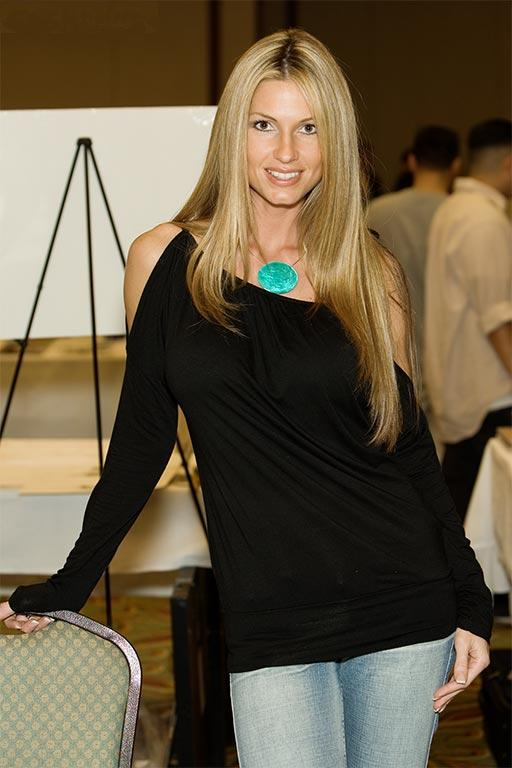

Personal details
- Born: December 1, 1975 (age 50) Memphis, Tennessee, U.S.
- Height: 5 ft 7 in (1.70 m)

Stephanie Glasson is an American model. She is the Playboy Playmate of the Month for July 2004. Married former NHL goalie Curtis Joseph in 2012.

== August ==
Pilar M. Lastra
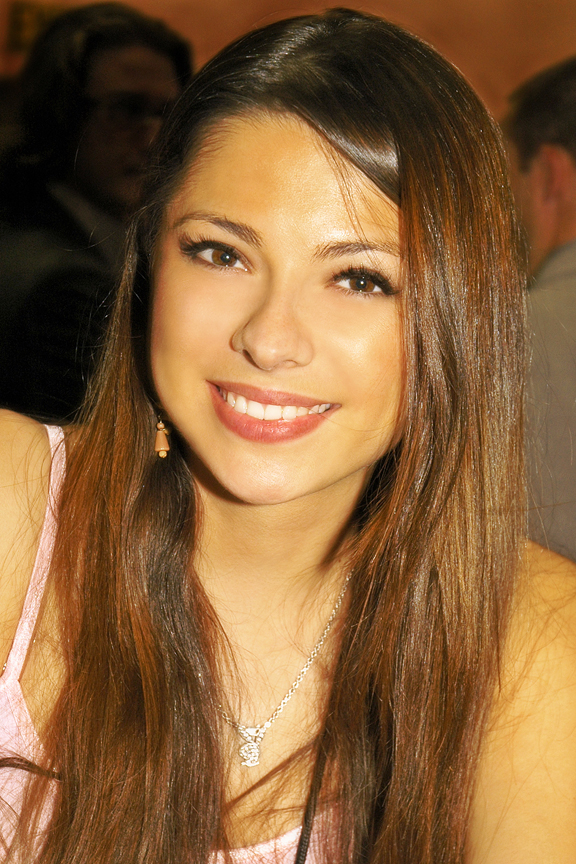
- Lastra in 2006

Playboy centerfold appearance
- August 2004

Personal details
- Born: Pilar Montserrat Lastra; January 15, 1981 (age 45) Monterey Park, California, U.S.
- Height: 5 ft 5.5 in (1.66 m)

Pilar Lastra (born January 15, 1981) is a model and the Playboy Playmate of the Month for August 2004. After her appearance in 2004, she stepped away from nude modeling but still worked for Playboy by hosting "The Playmate Hour" on Playboy Radio. Lastra was a model on Deal or No Deal. Lastra has been in three movies and two episodes of the television show Las Vegas. In addition to her modeling and acting, she has written a book, Treat Me Like Your Car, A Man's Guide to Treating a Lady.

== September ==
Scarlett Keegan

Personal details
- Born: May 18, 1984 (age 42) Westlake Village, California, U.S.
- Height: 5 ft 5 in (1.65 m)

Scarlett Keegan (born May 18, 1984, in Westlake Village, California) is an American model and Playboy's Playmate of the Month for September 2004.

Scarlett Keegan's mom was born in Ireland and lived there until the age of 15. Keegan takes the time to visit Ireland annually with her husband who is also of Irish descent. "I visit Dublin at least once a year, and I’m happy to say that I have spent at least one St. Patrick's Day in the city", she told the website Playmates.com. "It's a bank holiday there, so the streets were completely packed. My favorite part was the huge parade that takes place in the city center."

After Playboy, Keegan pursued an acting career in the mid- and late 2000s, including a small part in Walk Hard: The Dewey Cox Story. As of 2019, Keegan lives in southern California with her husband and two children.

== October ==
Kimberly Holland
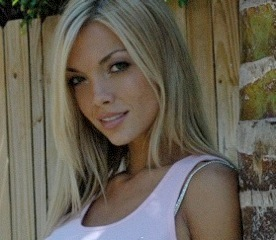

Personal details
- Born: August 1, 1982 (age 44) Humble, Texas, U.S.
- Height: 5 ft 5 in (1.65 m)

Kimberly Holland (born August 1, 1982) is an American model and Playmate of the Month for October 2004. Gorgeous, buxom, and voluptuous blonde bombshell Kimberly Ann Holland was born on August 1, 1982, in Humble, Texas. Kimberly graduated from Humble High School in 2000. She tried out for "Playboy" for the 50th Anniversary Playmate Hunt. After making her debut in a pictorial in the December, 2003 issue of "Playboy", Holland was chosen to be the Playmate of the Month for the October, 2004 issue of the famous men's magazine. She has appeared in a couple of "Playboy" videos. Moreover, Kimberly was the "Playboy" Cyber Girl of the Week for the fourth week of January, 2004 and the Cyber Girl of the Month for May, 2004. That same year Holland also graduated from the University of Houston with a degree in marketing. In 2010 she graduated with a degree in nursing from the University of Miami. As of 2019, Holland is living in Florida and has one son.

== November ==
Cara Zavaleta

Personal details
- Born: June 15, 1980 (age 46) Bowling Green, Ohio, U.S.
- Height: 5 ft 6 in (1.68 m)

Cara Zavaleta (born June 15, 1980, in Bowling Green, Ohio) is an American model and reality TV personality. She is the Playboy Playmate of the Month for November 2004.

Cara Zavaleta is a wine enthusiast who would like to eventually become an independent winemaker. "I must make wine", she has said. "There's just one problem: I’m equally obsessed with Southern California, which isn’t exactly Napa Valley in terms of wine production. The good news is that a few different Malibu-based vineyards produce great wine. So who knows? Maybe I’ll combine my two passions—wine and Southern California—and become the next big Malibu winemaker."

== December ==
Tiffany Fallon

Playboy Playmate of the Year
- 2005
- Preceded by: Carmella DeCesare
- Succeeded by: Kara Monaco

Personal details
- Born: May 1, 1974 (age 52) Ft. Lauderdale, Florida, U.S.
- Height: 5 ft 6 in (1.68 m)

Tiffany Fallon (born May 1, 1974, in Ft. Lauderdale, Florida) is an American model and is Playboy's Playmate of the Month for December. She is also the 2005 Playmate of the Year. She married country singer Joe Don Rooney; the couple has two children.

== See also ==
- List of people in Playboy 2000–2009

Colleen Shannon	Aliya Wolf	Sandra Hubby	Krista Kelly	Nicole Whitehead	Hiromi Oshima
Stephanie Glasson	Pilar Lastra	Scarlett Keegan	Kimberly Holland	Cara Zavaleta	Tiffany Fallon
