= Carmella DeCesare =

American model (born 1982)

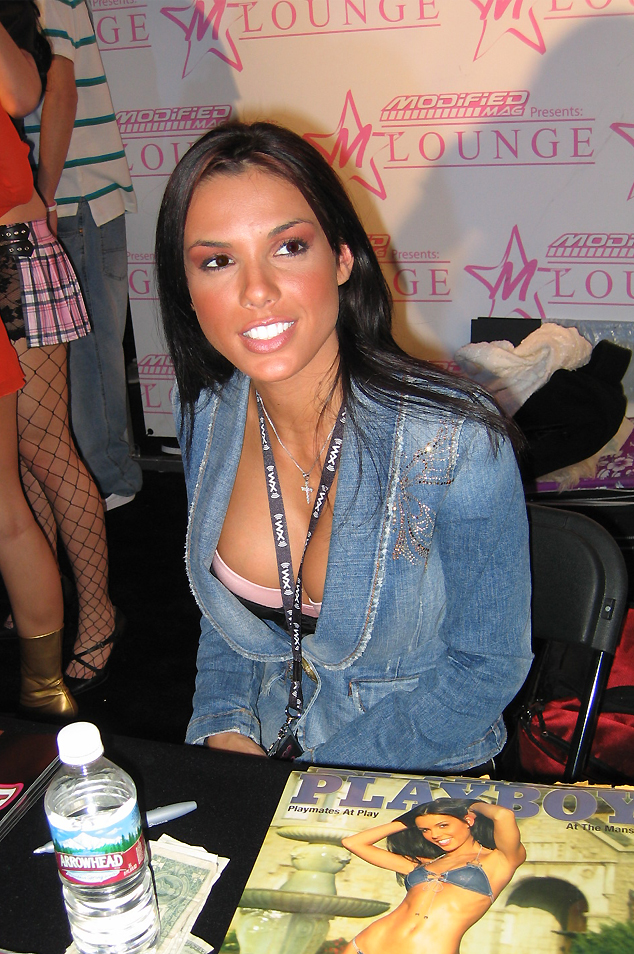
- DeCesare at Hot Import Nights, 2006
- Born: Carmella Danielle DeCesare; July 1, 1982 (age 44); Avon Lake, Ohio, U.S.
- Other name: Carmella Danielle Garcia
- Occupations: Model; professional wrestler; realtor
- Years active: 2003–2008 (model); 2004 (wrestler)
- Spouse: Jeff Garcia (m. 2007; div. 2020)
- Children: 4

Playboy centerfold appearance
- April 2003
- Preceded by: Pennelope Jimenez
- Succeeded by: Laurie Fetter

Playboy Playmate of the Year
- 2004
- Preceded by: Christina Santiago
- Succeeded by: Tiffany Fallon
- Professional wrestling career
- Ring name: Carmella
- Billed height: 5 ft 8 in (1.73 m)
- Billed weight: 118 lb (54 kg)
- Billed from: Avon Lake, Ohio
- Trained by: World Wrestling Entertainment
- Debut: October 19, 2004
- Retired: November 18, 2004

Carmella Danielle Garcia (née DeCesare; born July 1, 1982) is an American former model and professional wrestler. She was Playboy magazine's Miss April 2003, and Playboy’s 2004 Playmate of the Year. She is also known for her time as a contestant in the 2004 WWE Diva Search.

As of 2026, Garcia works as a realtor for Oppenheim Group in California. The same year, she joined the cast of the twentieth season of the Bravo reality series The Real Housewives of Orange County.

== Early life ==
DeCesare is a native of Avon Lake, Ohio. She is of Italian and Puerto Rican ancestry.

== Modeling career ==
DeCesare originally came to Playboy's attention after she applied to Playboy TV's reality television show; Who Wants to Be a Playboy Centerfold. She was selected as a finalist to take part of the show but withdrew before filming due to having second thoughts about the endeavor. When Playboy founder Hugh Hefner learned this, he invited her to his birthday party and convinced her to change her mind. She was then subsequently chosen as the Playboy Cybergirl of the Week, then becoming Playboy Cybergirl of the Month, before officially becoming Playboy's Miss April in 2003.

DeCesare posed nude for Playboy magazine and featured as the cover girl on multiple occasions, including on the June 2004 edition of the magazine where she was named the 2004 Playmate of the Year. She appeared in the 2005 Playmates at Play at the Playboy Mansion Swimsuit Calendar as Miss March. Between 2005 and 2007, she appeared in multiple episodes of E! Network's, reality television series The Girls Next Door.

DeCesare appeared in multiple Playboy specials, including an individual direct to video special titled; Playboy Video Centerfold: Playmate of the Year Carmella DeCesare.

In 2006, she posed for Muscle & Fitness online.

In 2008, DeCesare posed in the Sports Illustrated Swimsuit Issue, player's wife feature, as the wife of Jeff Garcia.

== World Wrestling Entertainment (WWE) ==
DeCesare appeared for the WWE participating in the WWE's 2004 reality competition; WWE Diva Search, where she ultimately placed as the runner-up losing to Christy Hemme. During her time in the WWE Diva Search, she no-showed a WWE Diva Dodgeball game at the WWE 2004 SummerSlam pay-per-view. She also participated in the controversial, infamous Diss The Diva challenge hosted by Stacy Keibler, during an episode of RAW DeCesare alongside remaining diva search contestants; Amy Weber, Christy Hemme and Joy Giovanni competed in a live shoot promo challenge. The segment has gained notoriety for being one of WWE's most explicit segments in history. The segment began with contestant Maria Kanellis being eliminated and giving DeCesare the middle finger. Once the contest began, Amy Weber called DeCesare a "whore" and told her that "having a cock in her mouth, had nothing to do with wrestling", before calling her a bitch. DeCesare responded to Weber by claiming she tried out for Playboy but they laughed at her audition. Christy Hemme called DeCesare a "cum burping, gutter slut". Joy Giovanni called out DeCesare stating; "Carmella, you talk a lot of shit, but look at you, you've got a gap so wide you could drive a truck right through there baby!". DeCesare responded by outing Giovanni as a mother, something she had not told WWE higher-ups, as during this time there was a stigma against women having children in the industry.

Despite placing second, DeCesare went on to briefly feud with eventual winner Christy Hemme, which led to a Lingerie Pillow Fight Match at the 2004 Taboo Tuesday pay-per-view in a losing effort. This was her last appearance for the promotion. During an interview on the Girls Next Level podcast in 2023, DeCesare revealed she wanted to stay with the company but her agent at the time was asking for double the amount of money that the WWE were offering her to sign a contract.

== Legal issues ==
On September 10, 2004, DeCesare pleaded not guilty to assault in a Cleveland, Ohio court after a physical fight in a bar on August 21, 2004, with a woman named Kristen Hine. She was acquitted of the assault charge on January 12, 2005, but found guilty of violating a restraining order. She was sentenced to do 24 hours of community service, given one year probation and fined $150.

During the trial, DeCesare testified that her then boyfriend Jeff Garcia, and at the time the quarterback for the Cleveland Browns, had been involved in an affair with Hine, after their relationship began. Garcia went on to comment; "It's embarrassing that I am here today, to be caught up in a situation like this."

== Personal life ==
On April 21, 2007, DeCesare married then NFL quarterback Jeff Garcia at the CordeValle Resort in San Martin, California. They have four children together. Their first daughter was born in 2008, their second was born in 2009, their third was born in 2010 and in December 2011, their fourth child was born. In a Christmas Day post in 2020, Garcia revealed on his official Instagram page that he and DeCesare were officially divorced saying; "Things happen, but we are still great friends and co parent our beautiful 4 kids together."

DeCesare and Garcia together founded the Garcia Pass It On Foundation, in order to share resources with people in less fortunate circumstances across America.

== Filmography ==
Film and television
Year	Title	Role	Notes
2002	Who Wants to Be a Playboy Centerfold	Self; contestant	
2003	Playboy Cybergirls	Self; playmate	1 episode
2004	Lingo	Self; contestant	1 episode
2004	Street Smarts	Self; contestant	1 episode
2004	Family Feud	Self; contestant	1 episode
2004	Howard Stern	Self; guest	1 episode
2004	WWE RAW Diva Search Casting Special	Self; contestant	TV special
2004	WWE 2004 RAW Diva Search	Self; contestant	2nd place, 10 episodes
2005–2007	The Girls Next Door	Self; playmate	4 episodes
2010	Playboy Shootout	Self; judge	7 episodes
2011	Hooters 2011 International Swimsuit Pageant	Self; audience member	TV special
2014	The Real Housewives of San Diego	Self; guest	1 episode
2018	Playboy Anthology	Self; 2004 Playmate of the Year	1 episode
2022	Secrets of Playboy	Self; 2004 Playmate of the Year	1 episode
2023	Selling Sunset	Self; realtor	1 episode
2023	Girls Next Level Podcast	Self; guest	2 episodes
2026	The Real Housewives of Orange County	Self; main cast member	Season 20

Direct to video
Year	Title	Role	Notes
2003	Playboy Video Playmate Calendar 2004	Self; Miss February	
2004	Playboy Video Centerfold: Playmate of the Year Carmella DeCesare	Self; Playmate	
2004	Playboy: 50 Years of Playmates	Self; Miss April 2003	
2004	Playboy Video Playmate Calendar 2005	Self; Miss December	
2005	Playboy's Nude Dorm Party	Self; Playmate	

Preceded by Sara Schwartz	Playboy Cyber Girl of the Week; October 21, 2002	Succeeded by Katie Hadorn
Preceded by Mary Beth Decker	Playboy Cyber Girl of the Month; February 2003	Succeeded by Heather McQuaid

Rebecca Ramos	Charis Boyle	Pennelope Jimenez	Carmella DeCesare	Laurie Fetter	Tailor James
Markéta Jánská	Colleen Marie	Luci Victoria	Audra Lynn	Divini Rae	Deisy and Sarah Teles
