= Lauren Anderson (model) =

American model

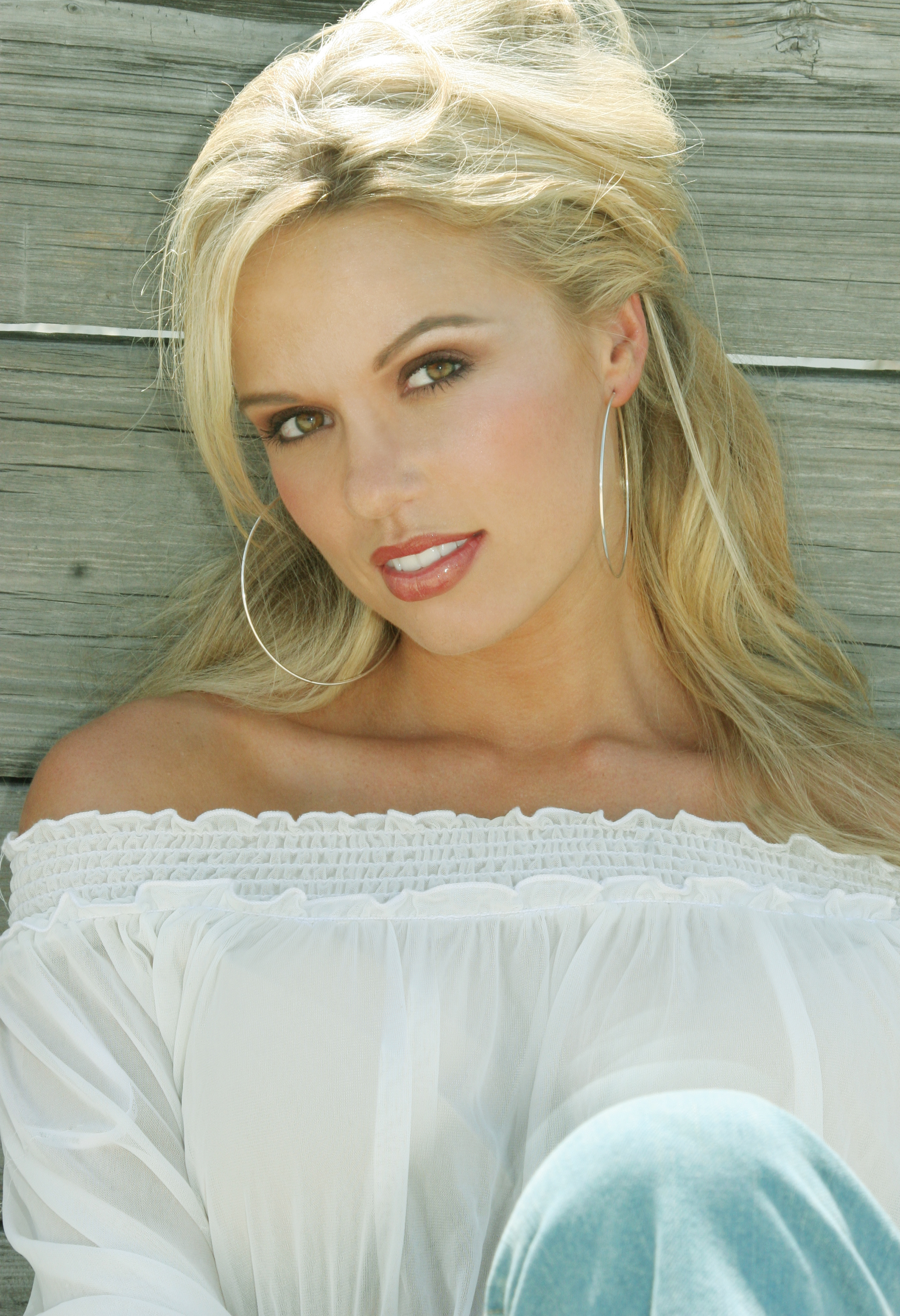
- Spouse: Reid Brignac (m. 2010)

Playboy centerfold appearance
- July 2002
- Preceded by: Michele Rogers
- Succeeded by: Christina Santiago

Personal details
- Born: 6 June 1980 (age 46) Milwaukee, Wisconsin, U.S.
- Height: 5 ft 9 in (1.75 m)

Signature
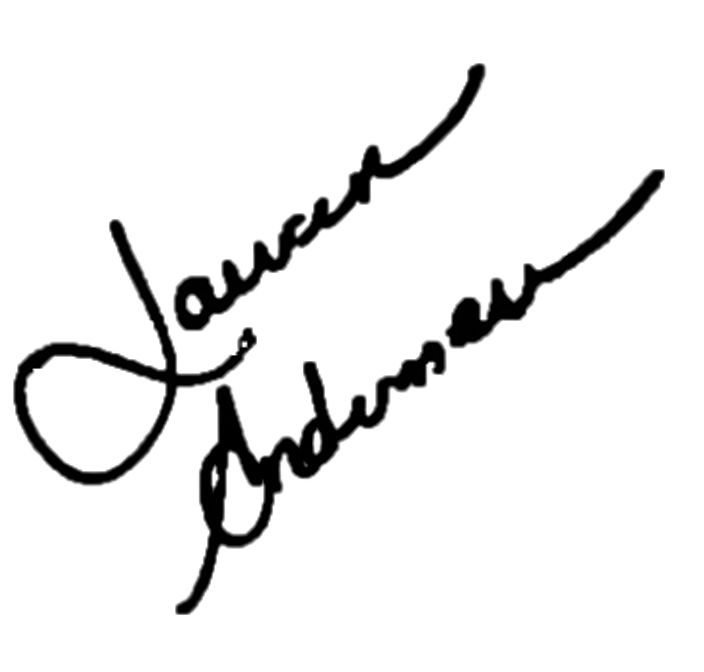

Lauren Anderson (born June 6, 1980) is an American model. She was Playboy's Playmate of the Month in July 2002.

== Modeling career ==
Anderson was the winner of the television special Who Wants to Be a Playboy Centerfold?, broadcast on Fox in May 2002. She was Playboy's Playmate of the Month in July 2002, and has appeared in numerous Playboy videos. She starred in the variety production "Headlights and Tailpipes" in Las Vegas at the Stardust Resort & Casino. Anderson appeared in the March 2008 issue of Playboy Spain, on the cover and in a pictorial, alongside an interview.

== Animal rights activism ==
Anderson originally hoped to open an animal rescue shelter, and became a PETA member in 2007. She joined multiple protests against the American Meat Institute's Annual Hot Dog Day on Capitol Hill by dressing in a lettuce bikini and handing out vegetarian hot dogs, including in 2002, 2005, and 2007.

== Personal life ==
Anderson is from a small town in Florida. Anderson married former baseball player Reid Brignac in 2010. They have two children together.

== Filmography ==
- Playboy: Who Wants to Be a Playboy Centerfold? (2002)
- Playboy Video Playmate Calendar 2003 (2002)

== Television appearances ==
Anderson has appeared on The Girls Next Door, Fear Factor, The Howard Stern Show, and The Two Coreys.

Nicole Narain	Anka Romensky	Tina Marie Jordan	Heather Carolin	Christi Shake	Michele Rogers
Lauren Anderson	Christina Santiago	Shallan Meiers	Teri Harrison	Serria Tawan	Lani Todd
