= List of Playboy Playmates of 2001 =

The following is a list of Playboy Playmates of 2001. Playboy magazine names its Playmate of the Month each month throughout the year.

== January ==
Irina Voronina
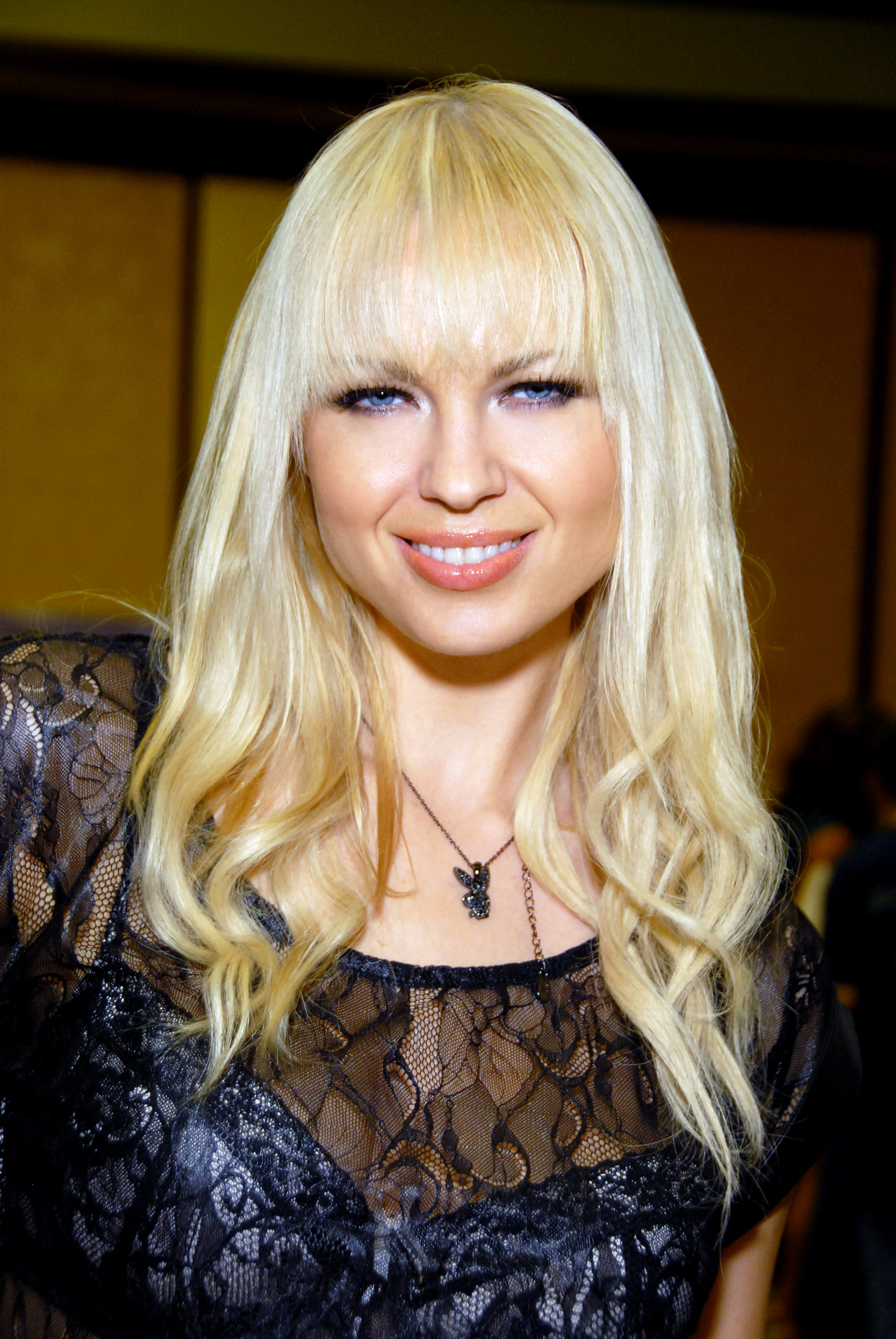
- Irina Voronina, Los Angeles, California on October 1, 2011

Personal details
- Born: December 19, 1977 (age 48) Dzerzhinsk, Russia
- Height: 5 ft 9.5 in (1.77 m)

Irina Voronina (Russian: Ирина Воронина, born December 19, 1977, in Dzerzhinsk, Russia) is a Russian model and Playboy's Playmate of the Month for January 2001. She has also modeled for Perfect 10.

== February ==
Lauren Michelle Hill

Personal details
- Born: June 27, 1979 (age 47) Columbia, South Carolina, U.S.
- Height: 5 ft 6 in (1.68 m)

Lauren Michelle Hill (born June 27, 1979) is an American model and actress. She appeared on the cover of Playboy on the October (Girls of Conference USA) 2000 issue. She is Playboy Playmate of the Month in February 2001. Hill was a cheerleader at the University of South Carolina while studying journalism. While modeling and acting, she is known as Lauren James.

She is married to actor Sean Patrick Flanery and they have two sons together.

== March ==
Miriam Gonzalez
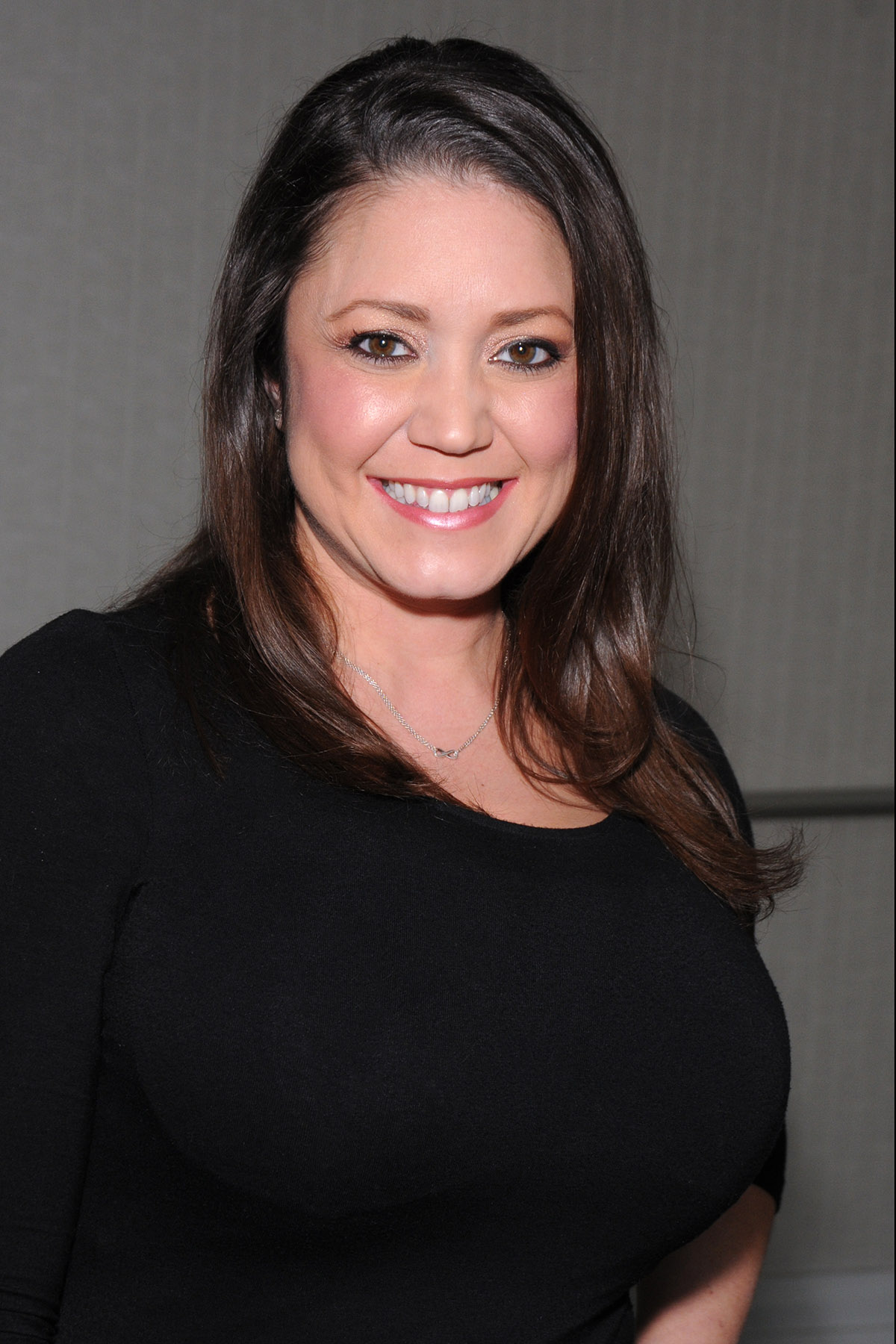
- Miriam Gonzalez, Hollywood, California on January 4, 2014

Personal details
- Born: July 8, 1977 (age 49) Queens, New York, U.S.
- Height: 5 ft 4 in (1.63 m)

Miriam Gonzalez (born July 8, 1977, in Queens, New York) is an American glamour model. She is Playboy's Playmate of the Month for March 2001. She has appeared in Playboy videos and Playboy Special Editions.

== April ==
Katie Lohmann
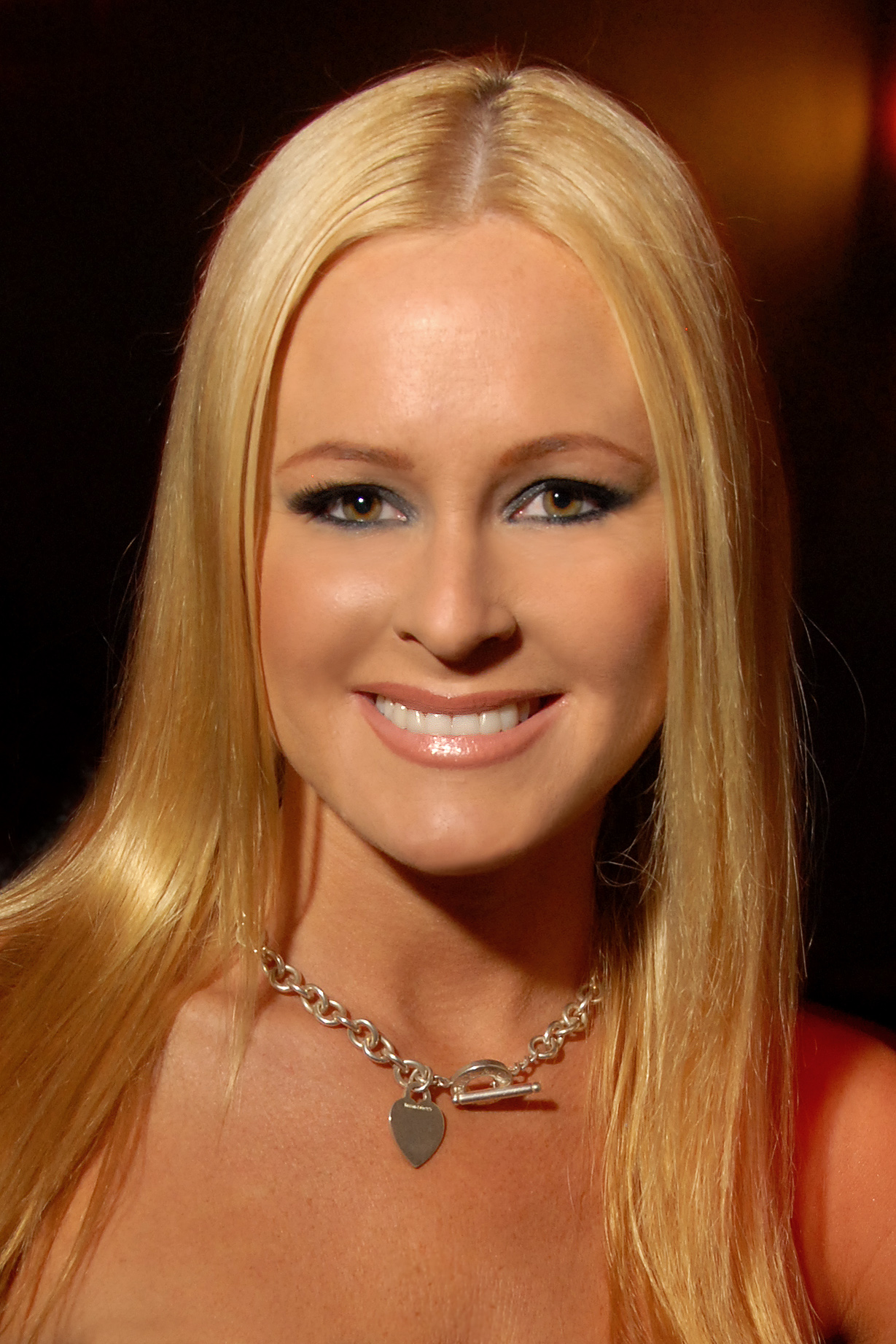
- Katie Lohmann attending Alana Curry's Birthday Party at Vice, Hollywood, California on May 7, 2009

Personal details
- Born: January 29, 1980 (age 46) Scottsdale, Arizona, U.S.
- Height: 5 ft 4 in (1.63 m)

Katie Lohmann (born January 29, 1980 in Scottsdale, Arizona) is a model, actress, and the Playboy Playmate of the Month for April 2001. Her first appearance in Playboy was in the Playmate 2000 search pictorial, published in the December 1999 issue, according to which she was described as a massage therapist.

== May ==
Crista Nicole

Personal details
- Born: Crista Nicole Wagner; July 24, 1978 (age 48) Springfield, Ohio, U.S.
- Height: 5 ft 9 in (1.75 m)

Crista Nicole Wagner (born July 24, 1978) better known as Crista Nicole is an American model. She is Playboy's Playmate of the Month for May 2001. Her centerfold was photographed by Arny Freytag.

== June ==
Heather Spytek

Personal details
- Born: December 17, 1977 (age 48) Woodbury, New Jersey, U.S.
- Height: 5 ft 6 in (1.68 m)

Heather Spytek (born December 12, 1977) is an American model. She is Playboy's Playmate of the Month in June 2001 and has appeared in numerous Playboy videos.

== July ==
Kimberley Stanfield

Personal details
- Born: November 18, 1981 (age 44) Vancouver, British Columbia, Canada
- Height: 5 ft 6 in (1.68 m)

Kimberley Stanfield (born November 18, 1981, in Vancouver, British Columbia) is a Canadian model. She is Playboy magazine's Playmate of the Month for July 2001.

== August ==
Jennifer Walcott

Personal details
- Born: May 8, 1977 (age 49) Youngstown, Ohio, U.S.
- Height: 5 ft 3 in (1.60 m)

Jennifer Walcott (born May 8, 1977, in Youngstown, Ohio) is an American glamour model and actress best known as Playboy magazine's Playmate of the Month for August 2001.

Walcott is married to former NFL safety Adam Archuleta. They live in Los Angeles and had their first child on April 10, 2008.

== September ==
Dalene Kurtis

Playboy Playmate of the Year
- 2002
- Preceded by: Brande Roderick
- Succeeded by: Christina Santiago

Personal details
- Born: November 12, 1977 (age 48) Apple Valley, California, U.S.
- Height: 5 ft 5 in (1.65 m)

Dalene Kurtis (born November 12, 1977, in Apple Valley, California) is an American model. She was Playboy's Playmate of the Month for September 2001 and Playmate of the Year for 2002. She is the first Playboy Playmate to shoot with shaved pubic area.

== October ==
Stephanie Heinrich

Personal details
- Born: November 13, 1979 (age 46) Cincinnati, Ohio, U.S.
- Height: 5 ft 3 in (1.60 m)

Stephanie Heinrich (born November 13, 1979) is an American model and actress. She became Playboy's first Cyber Girl of the Week in September 2000 and the first Cyber Girl of the Month (in January 2001). She is Playboy's Playmate of the Month for October 2001 and has appeared in Playboy videos.

In 2015 she published a memoir, "A Bunny Tells All", about her work for Playboy.

== November ==
Lindsey Vuolo

Personal details
- Born: October 19, 1981 (age 44) Princeton, New Jersey, U.S.
- Height: 5 ft 8 in (1.73 m)

Lindsey Eve Vuolo (born October 19, 1981) is an American model best known for her appearance in Playboy as the November 2001 Playmate. Vuolo has appeared in Playboy features and in its special edition magazines. She was also photographed by Artie Lange for a nude pictorial in the "Celebrity Photographer" section of its website.

Pictures of Vuolo's bat mitzvah ceremony at age 13 were included in her Playboy pictorial. The fact that she attended synagogue while she was active with Playboy (although none of the men in the synagogue acknowledged recognizing her) led to a fair amount of media attention. "I consider myself a nice Jewish girl", Vuolo says of herself.

Vuolo married Jason Handrinos in Athens, Greece in 2013.

== December ==
Shanna Moakler
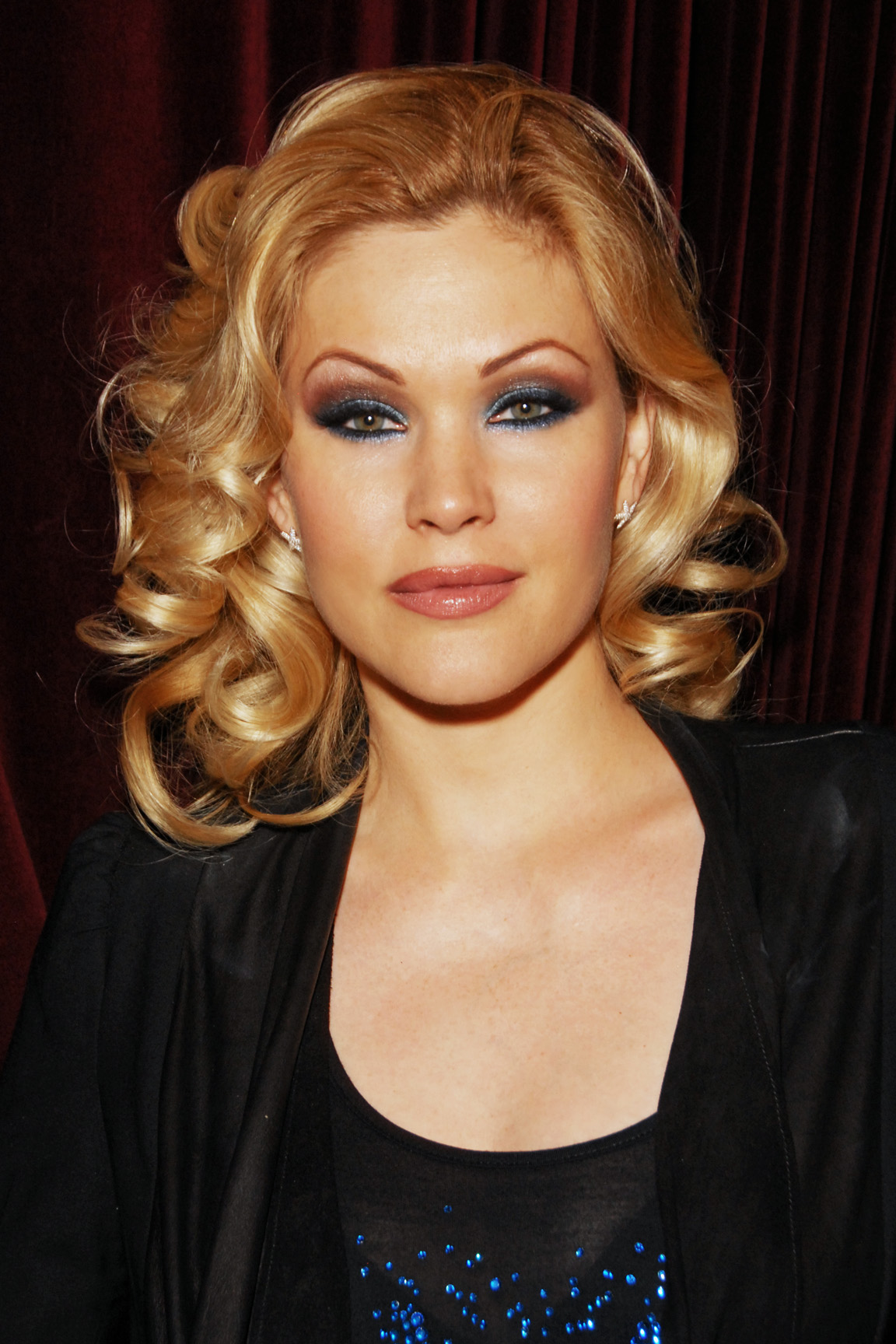
- Shanna Moakler at a Party for Miss California 2009: Nicole Johnson at The Crown Bar, Hollywood, California of May 1, 2010

Personal details
- Born: March 28, 1975 (age 51) Providence, Rhode Island, U.S.
- Height: 5 ft 8 in (1.73 m)

Shanna Moakler (born March 28, 1975) is an American model, actress, reality television star and a former beauty queen. She was the winner of the Miss New York USA pageant in 1995 and was originally the first runner-up at Miss USA 1995. She was later crowned Miss USA after Chelsi Smith won Miss Universe.

Moakler began her modeling career at the age of fifteen. She appeared in various publications, including such magazines as Cosmopolitan and Brentwood. She is Playboy's December 2001 Playmate of the Month. She has admitted that posing nude was "a little scary at first."

== See also ==
- List of people in Playboy 2000–2009

Irina Voronina	Lauren Michelle Hill	Miriam Gonzalez	Katie Lohmann	Crista Nicole	Heather Spytek
Kimberley Stanfield	Jennifer Walcott	Dalene Kurtis	Stephanie Heinrich	Lindsey Vuolo	Shanna Moakler
