= List of Playboy Playmates of 2003 =

The following is a list of Playboy Playmates of 2003. Playboy magazine names their Playmate of the Month each month throughout the year.

== January ==
Rebecca Anne Ramos

Personal details
- Born: August 26, 1967 (age 59) San Antonio, Texas, U.S.
- Height: 5 ft 5 in (1.65 m)

Rebecca Anne Ramos (born August 26, 1967) is an American model and actress. She has appeared in a few Playboy videos and is Playboy's Playmate of the Month for January 2003. At the time was the 2nd oldest woman to ever become a playmate, after Dolores Donlon. She was also Playboy's Cyber Girl of the Week for September 3–9, 2001.

Ramos is the granddaughter of Congressman Henry B. Gonzalez. She now works as a licensed practicing attorney in San Antonio, Texas

== February ==
Charis Boyle

Personal details
- Born: August 31, 1976 (age 50) Alexandria, Virginia, U.S.
- Height: 5 ft 8 in (1.73 m)

Charis Boyle (born August 31, 1976, in Alexandria, Virginia) is an American glamour model. She became Playboy's Playmate of the Month for February 2003 after having been a Playboy Cyber Girl in August 2001. Her centerfold was photographed by Stephen Wayda.

== March ==
Pennelope M. Jimenez

Personal details
- Born: July 26, 1978 (age 48) San Diego, California, U.S.
- Height: 5 ft 7 in (1.70 m)

Pennelope Jimenez (born July 26, 1978, in San Diego, California) is an American model and actress. She is Playboy's Playmate of the Month of March 2003 and has appeared in Playboy videos. She is partly of Mexican heritage.

== April ==
Carmella DeCesare
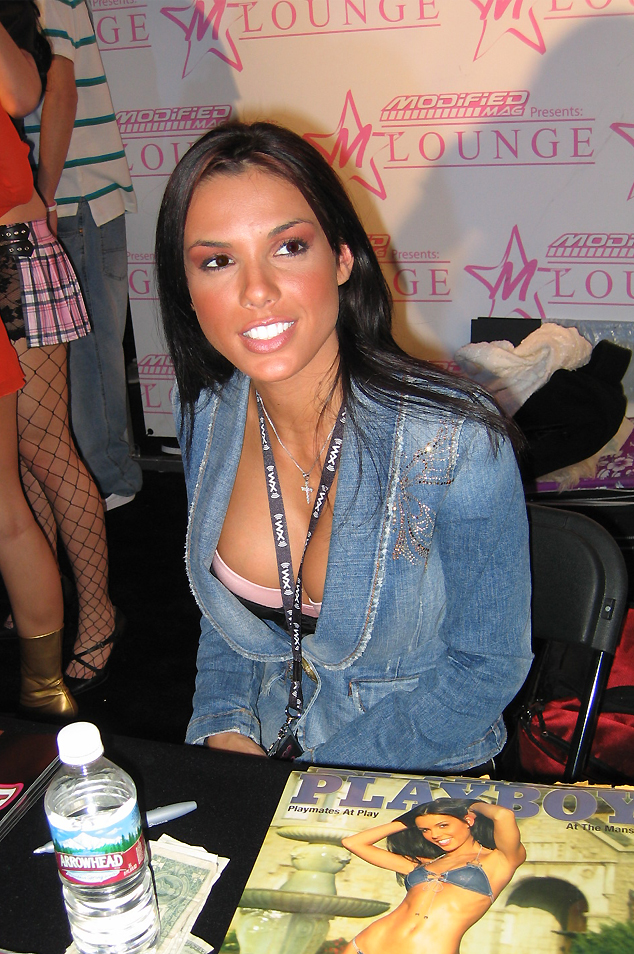

Playboy Playmate of the Year
- 2004
- Preceded by: Christina Santiago
- Succeeded by: Tiffany Fallon

Personal details
- Born: July 1, 1982 (age 44) Avon Lake, Ohio, U.S.
- Height: 5 ft 8 in (1.73 m)

Carmella DeCesare (born July 1, 1982) is an American model who is Playboy magazine's Miss April 2003 and Playmate of the Year for 2004. She performed in WWE's 2004 Diva Search.

Decesare married NFL quarterback Jeff Garcia in 2007. The couple has four children.

== May ==
Laurie Fetter

Personal details
- Born: January 9, 1982 (age 44) Chicago, Illinois, U.S.
- Height: 5 ft 8 in (1.73 m)

Laurie Fetter (born Laurie Jo Fetter on January 9, 1982, in Chicago, Illinois) is an American model and actress. She is Playboy's Playmate of the Month for May 2003.

== June ==
Tailor James
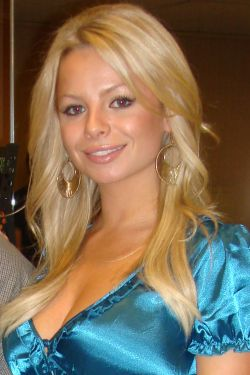

Personal details
- Born: July 21, 1980 (age 46) Mississauga, Ontario, Canada
- Height: 5 ft 4 in (1.63 m)

Tailor James (born July 21, 1980, in Mississauga, Ontario) is a Canadian model. Prior to her Playboy Playmate of the Month appearance in the June 2003 issue, she was Cyber Girl of the Week in September 2001, and Cyber Girl of the Month in January 2002.

== July ==
Markéta Jánská
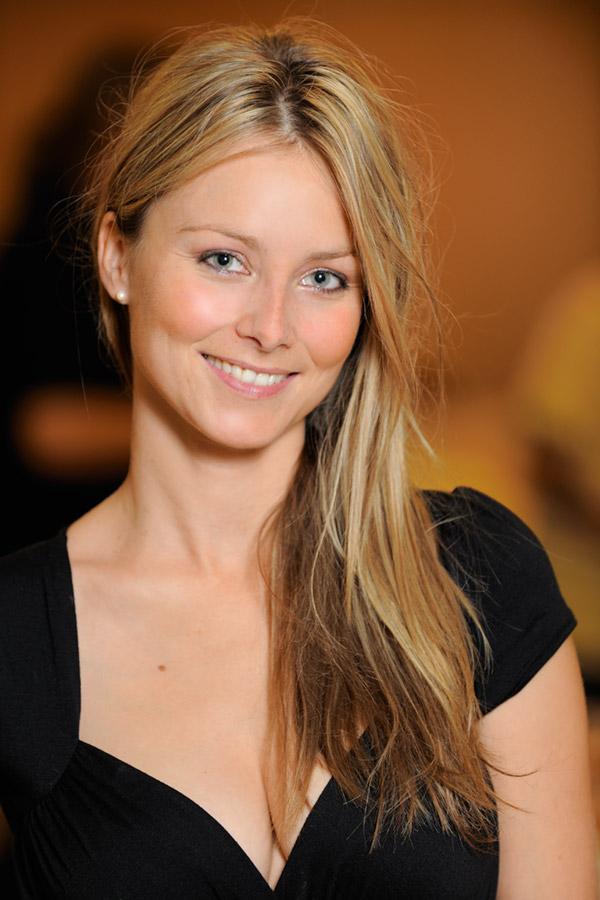

Personal details
- Born: 24 May 1981 (age 45) Most, Czechoslovakia
- Height: 5 ft 7 in (1.70 m)

Markéta Jánská (born 24 May 1981 in Most, Czechoslovakia) is a Czech model. She was Playboy magazine's Playmate of the Month for July 2003. Janska started modeling as a teenager and has aspirations of becoming a singer. After leaving home to travel Europe, she then came to the United States on a work permit hoping to become an American citizen.

Since her Playmate pictorial, she has appeared on a variety of television series such as CBS's CSI: Miami (2003) and Swingtown (2008), The Sharon Osbourne Show (2006), HBO's True Blood (2009) and 90210 as well as the 2010 comedy film Couples Retreat.

In 2015, after a trip to Tanzania, it was reported that Janska launched an online fundraising campaign via GoFundMe called "Desks for Kids". The purpose of the campaign is to purchase new desks and supplies for students she met while traveling.

== August ==
Colleen Marie
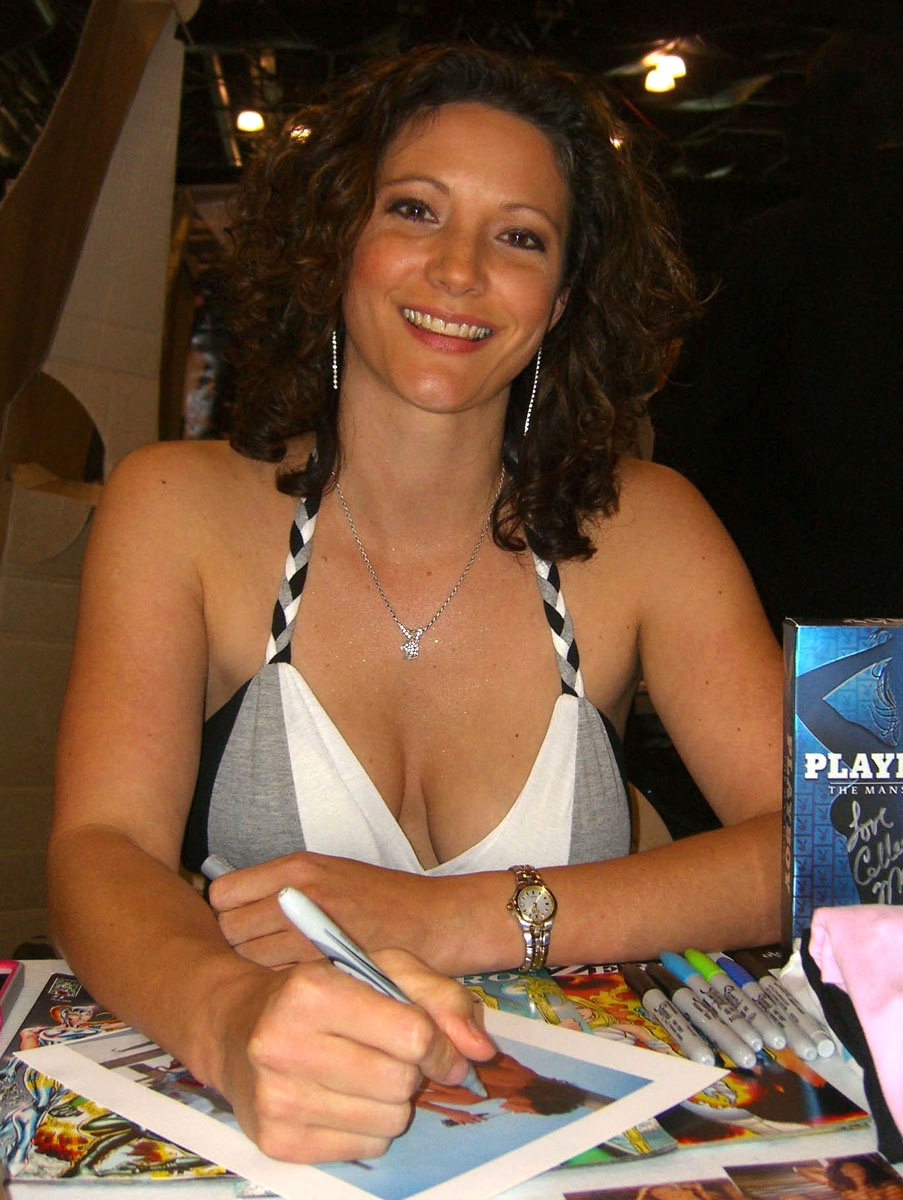
- Marie at the 2012 New York Comic Con.

Personal details
- Born: August 28, 1977 (age 49) Oklahoma City, Oklahoma, U.S.
- Height: 5 ft 7 in (1.70 m)

Colleen Marie (born Colleen Marie Dwyer on August 28, 1977, in Oklahoma City, Oklahoma) is an American model. She is Playboy magazine's Playmate of the Month for August 2003. Her centerfold was photographed by Arny Freytag.

== September ==
Luci Victoria

Personal details
- Born: Luci Victoria Oldfield; 2 February 1982 (age 44) Sheffield, England, UK
- Height: 5 ft 10 in (1.78 m)

Luci Victoria (born Luci Victoria Oldfield 2 February 1982 at Sheffield, England) is a British model. She is the Playboy Playmate of the Month in the US version of the magazine for September 2003. Her centerfold was photographed by Stephen Wayda.

== October ==
Audra Lynn
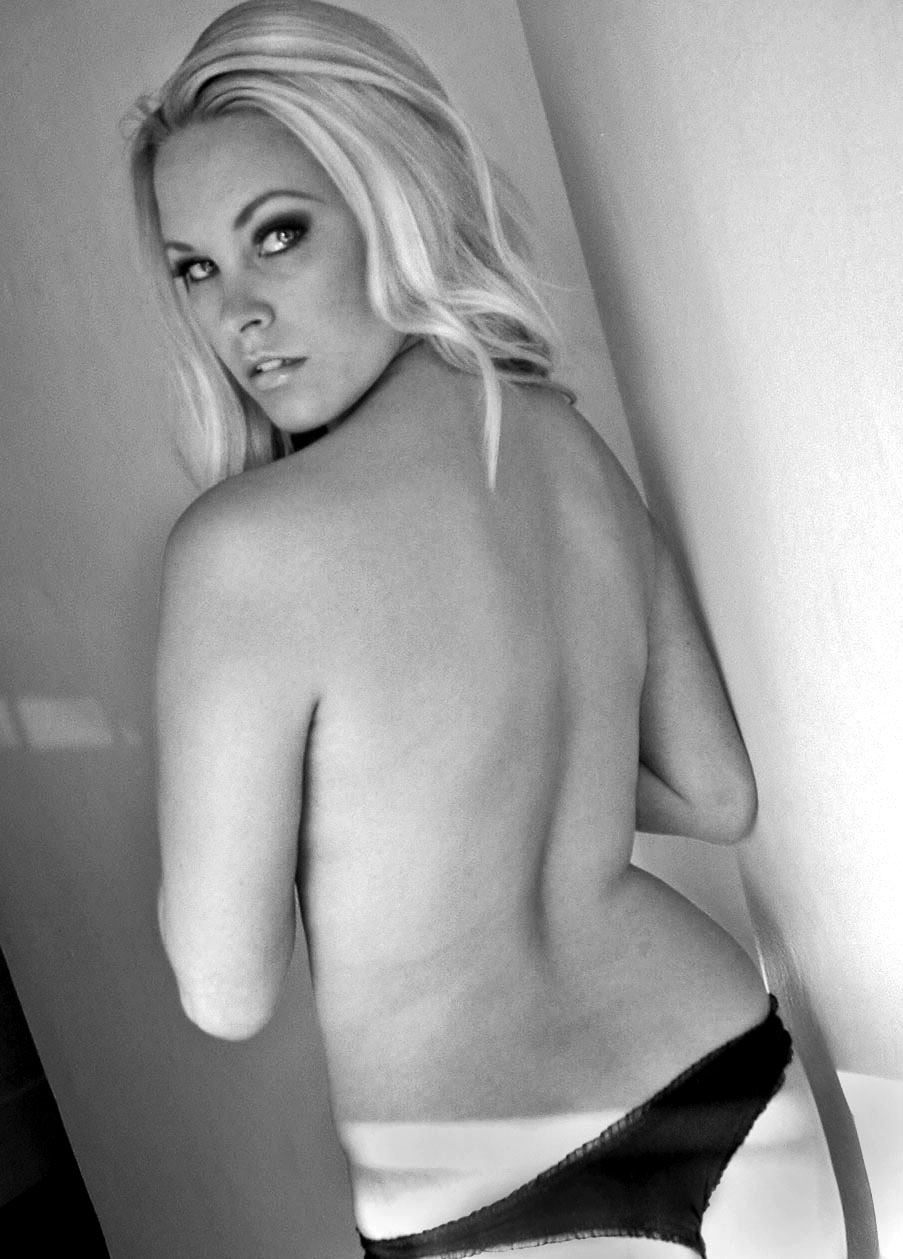

Personal details
- Born: Audra Lynn Christiansen; January 31, 1980 (age 46) Albert Lea, Minnesota, U.S.
- Height: 5 ft 8 in (1.73 m)

Audra Lynn (born Audra Lynn Christiansen January 31, 1980) is an American model and actress. She is Playboy magazine's Playmate of the Month for October 2003. Lynn was also photographed by Sum 41 for the celebrity photographer section of Playboy.com. Her Playmate centerfold was photographed by Stephen Wayda and Arny Freytag.

== November ==
Divini Rae

Personal details
- Born: July 31, 1977 (age 49) Alaska, U.S.
- Height: 5 ft 8 in (1.73 m)

Divini Rae (born July 31, 1977, in Alaska), aka Divini Rae Sorenson, is a motivational speaker, fitness personality and entrepreneur. She lives between Tanana, Alaska, and Oklahoma City, Oklahoma. She is Playboy magazine's Playmate of the Month for November, 2003.

== December ==
Deisy and Sarah Teles

Personal details
- Born: May 16, 1983 (age 43) Mucum, Brazil
- Height: 5 ft 8 in (1.73 m)

Deisy and Sarah Teles (born 16 May 1983 in Muçum, Brazil) are the Playboy Playmates of the Month for December 2003. They were the fourth identical twins to appear as playmates. The siblings first posed nude in a cover pictorial for the Brazilian Playboy in March 2003, after being chosen among 30,000 couples of twin sisters.

== See also ==
- List of people in Playboy 2000–2009

Rebecca Ramos	Charis Boyle	Pennelope Jimenez	Carmella DeCesare	Laurie Fetter	Tailor James
Markéta Jánská	Colleen Marie	Luci Victoria	Audra Lynn	Divini Rae	Deisy and Sarah Teles
