= List of Playboy Playmates of 2002 =

The following is a list of Playboy Playmates of 2002. Playboy magazine names its Playmate of the Month each month throughout the year.

== January ==
Nicole Narain

Personal details
- Born: July 28, 1974 (age 51) Chicago, Illinois, U.S.
- Height: 5 ft 4 in (1.63 m)

Nicole Narain (born July 28, 1974) is a Guyanese-American model and actress. She is Playboy's Playmate of the Month for January 2002 and has appeared in Playboy videos. She has also been featured in music videos and on reality TV programs.

== February ==
Anka Romensky

Personal details
- Born: 16 September 1980 (age 45) Kiev, Ukrainian SSR, Soviet Union
- Height: 5 ft 10 in (1.78 m)

Anka Romensky (born 16 September 1980) is a Ukrainian model. She is Playboy magazine's Playmate of the Month for February 2002.

== March ==
Tina Marie Jordan
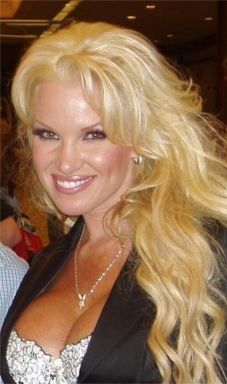

Personal details
- Born: August 21, 1972 (age 53) North Hollywood, Los Angeles, California, U.S.
- Height: 5 ft 5 in (1.65 m)

Tina Jordan (born August 21, 1972) is an American model and radio personality. She had been romantically involved with Hugh Hefner before appearing as Playmate of the Month for March 2002.

== April ==
Heather Carolin

Personal details
- Born: August 15, 1982 (age 43) Harbor City, California, U.S.
- Height: 5 ft 4 in (1.63 m)

Heather Carolin (born August 15, 1982) is an American model and actress, born in Harbor City, California.

== May ==
Christi Shake
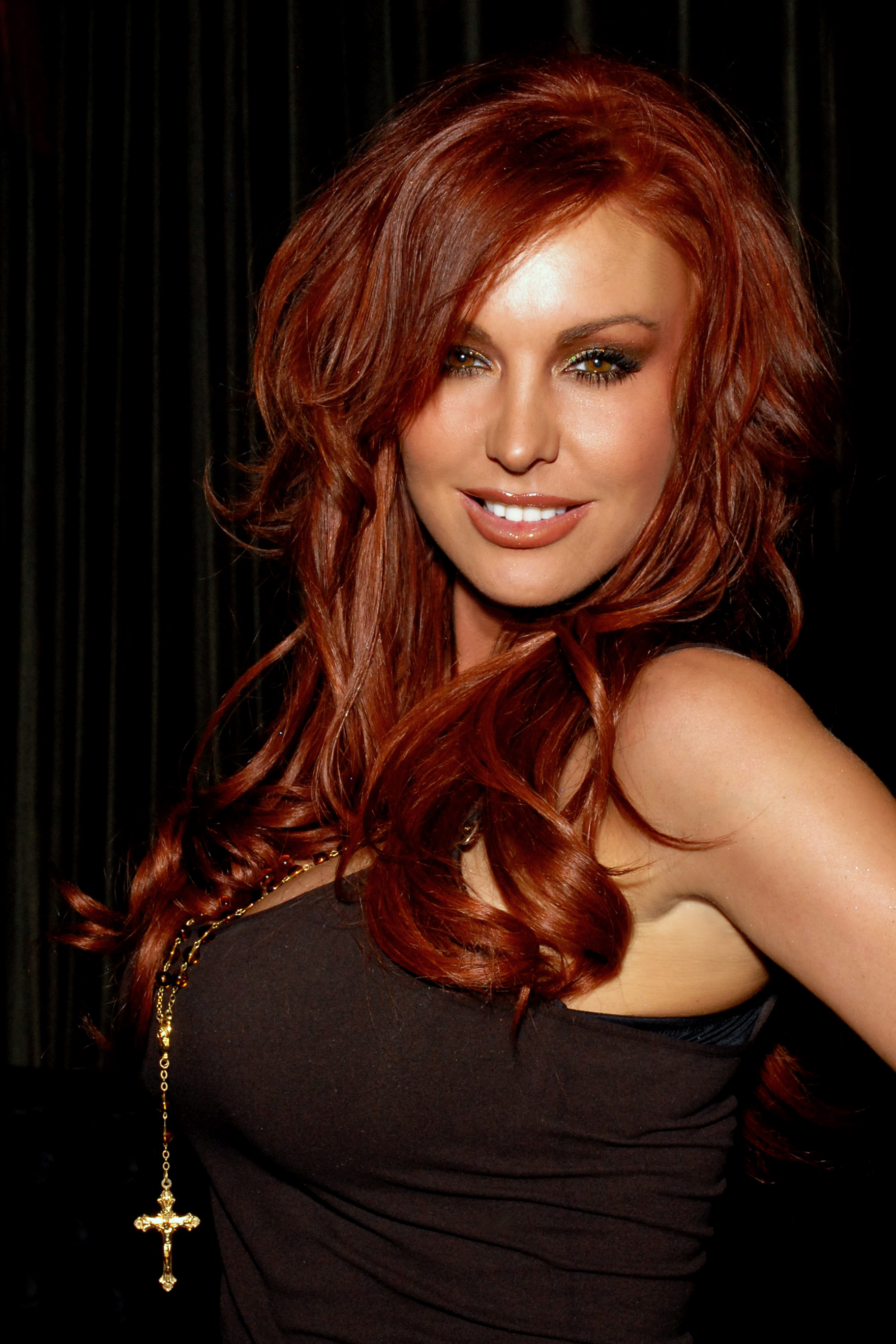
- Christi Shake attending a Benchwarmer Party at Bar Delux, Hollywood, California on April 18, 2009

Personal details
- Born: August 22, 1980 (age 45) Baltimore, Maryland, U.S.
- Height: 5 ft 7 in (1.70 m)

Christi Shake (born August 22, 1980) is an American model and actress. She is of Czech, German, Polish, Swedish and Dutch ancestry. Shake is Playboy magazine's Playmate of the Month for May 2002. She has appeared in Playboy videos.

== June ==
Michele Rogers

Personal details
- Born: May 14, 1976 (age 49) Honolulu, Hawaii, U.S.
- Height: 5 ft 3 in (1.60 m)

Michele Rogers (born May 14, 1976) is an American model and actress. She is Playboy's Playmate of the Month for June 2002, and has appeared in Playboy videos. In her Playmate pictorial she said her occupation was makeup artist.

== July ==
Lauren Anderson
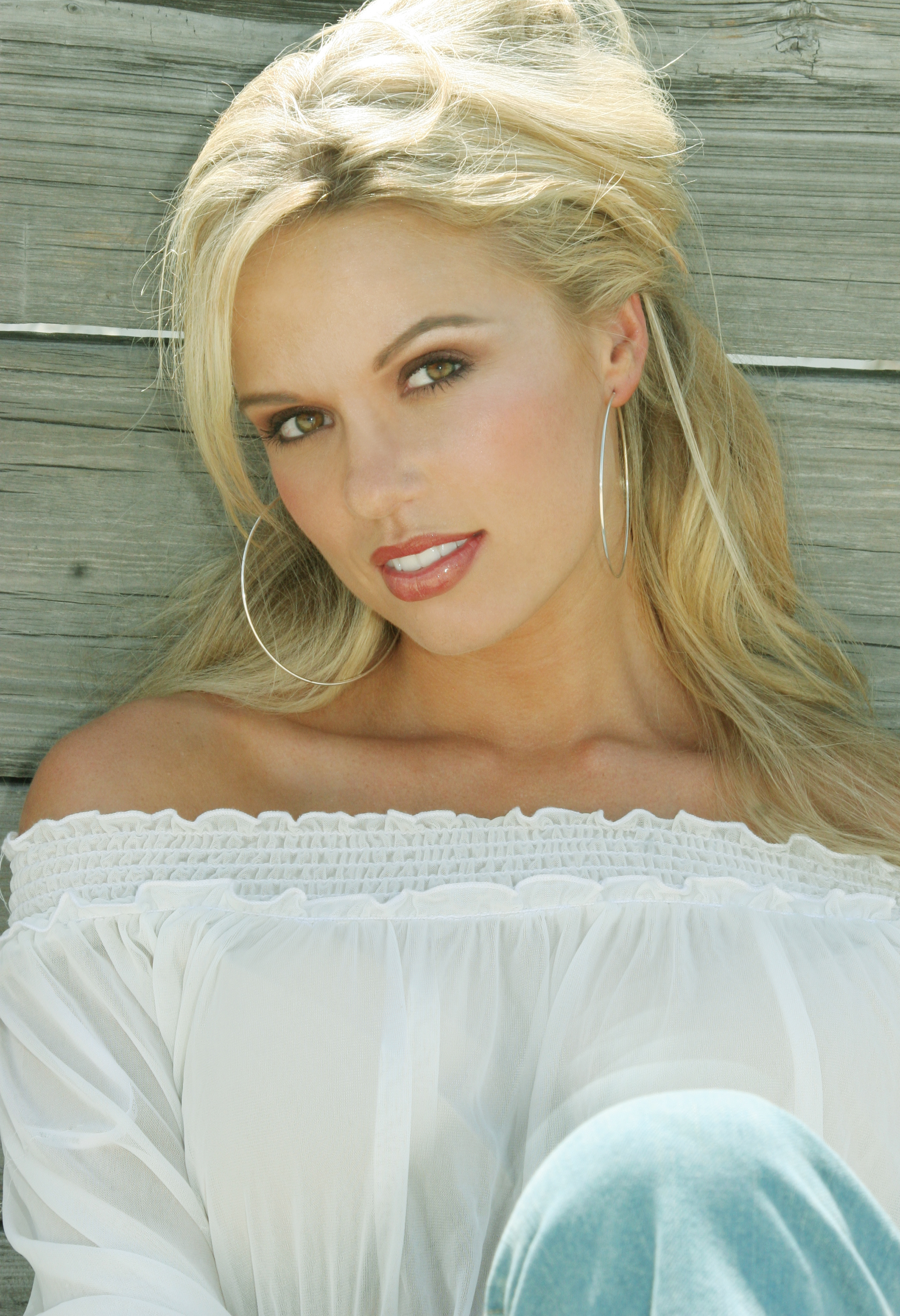

Personal details
- Born: June 6, 1980 (age 45) Milwaukee, Wisconsin, U.S.
- Height: 5 ft 9 in (1.75 m)

Lauren Anderson (born June 6, 1980; Milwaukee, Wisconsin) is an American model who was chosen as Playboy's Playmate of the Month for July 2002, and has appeared in Playboy videos. Lauren was the winner of the TV special Who Wants to Be a Playboy Centerfold?, broadcast on Fox in May 2002. She appeared in the variety production "Headlights and Tailpipes" in Las Vegas at the Stardust Resort & Casino.

== August ==
Christina Santiago
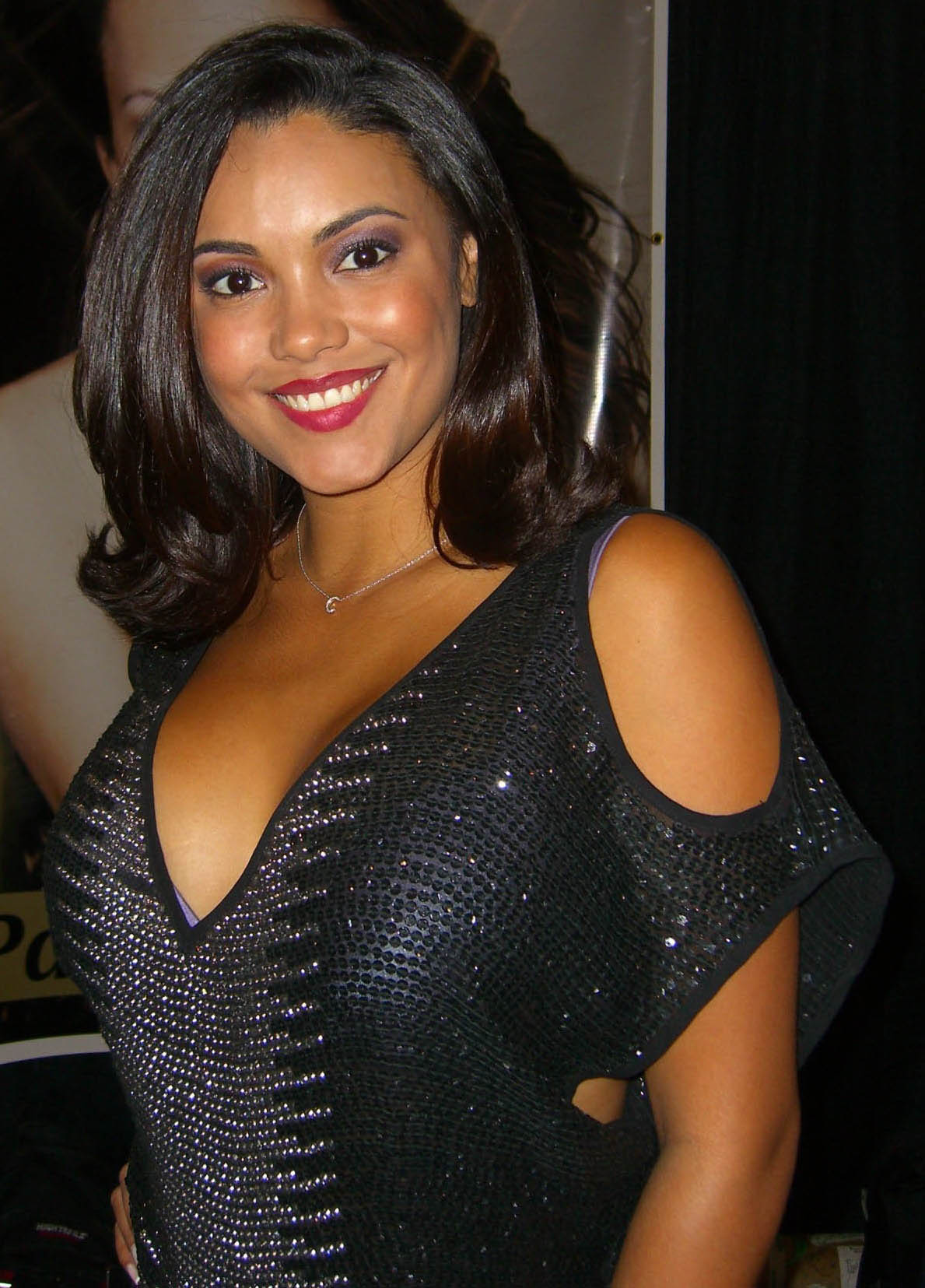
- Santiago at the 2012 New York Comic Con.

Playboy Playmate of the Year
- 2003
- Preceded by: Dalene Kurtis
- Succeeded by: Carmella DeCesare

Personal details
- Born: October 15, 1981 (age 44) Chicago, Illinois, U.S.
- Height: 5 ft 5 in (1.65 m)

Christina Santiago (born October 15, 1981, in Chicago, Illinois) of Puerto Rican descent, is an American model and actress. She was one of three finalists of the Fox TV special Who Wants to Be a Playboy Centerfold? and was chosen as Playboy's Playmate of the Month for August 2002. She then became Playmate of the Year in 2003.

== September ==
Shallan Meiers

Personal details
- Born: September 30, 1981 (age 44) San Diego, California, U.S.
- Height: 5 ft 10 in (1.78 m)

Shallan Meiers (born September 30, 1981, in San Diego, California) is an American model. She was chosen as Playboy's Playmate of the Month for September, 2002 after being a second runner-up on the Fox TV special Who Wants to Be a Playboy Centerfold? in May 2002.

== October ==
Teri Marie Harrison
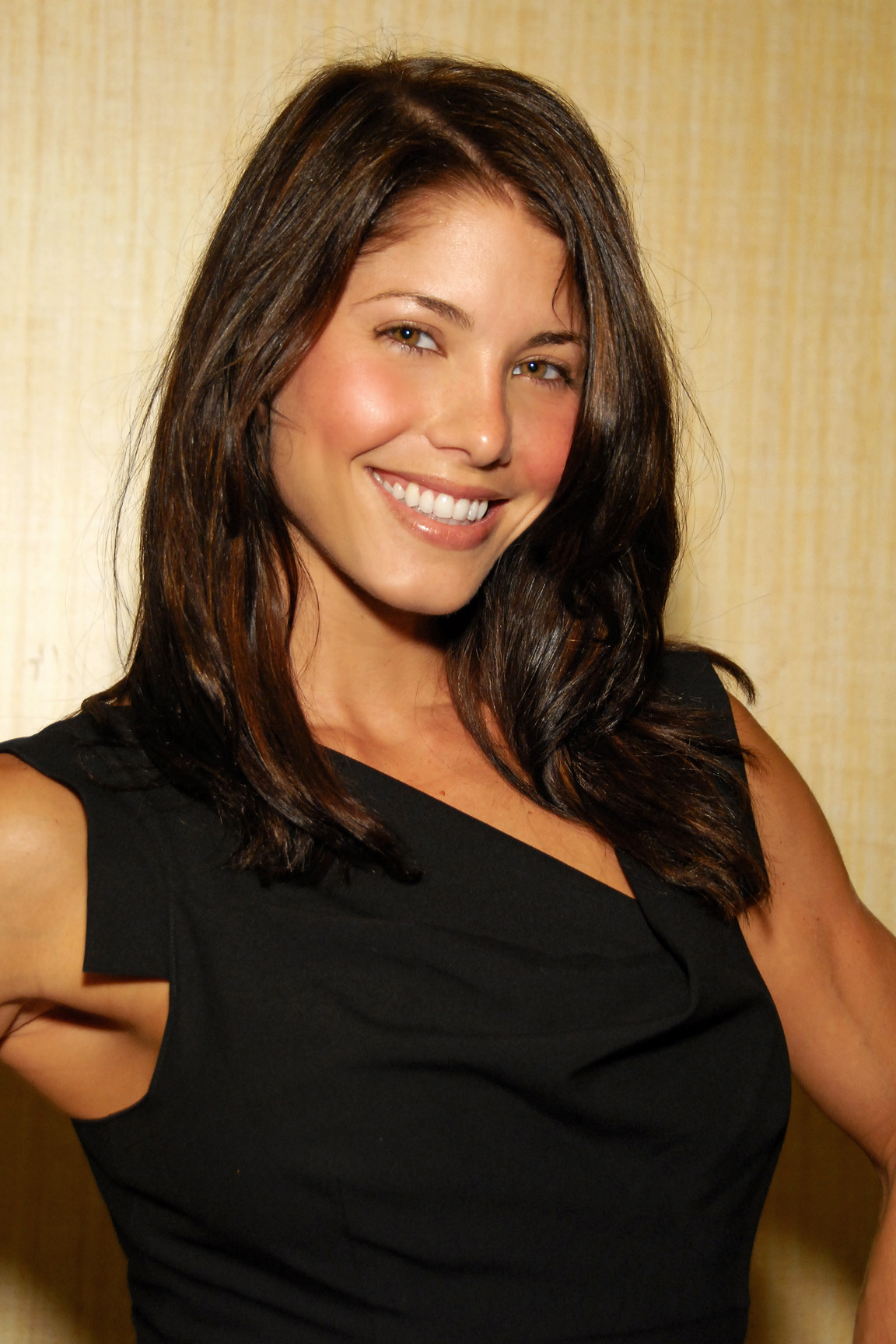
- Teri Harrison, Los Angeles, California on October 1, 2011

Personal details
- Born: February 16, 1981 (age 44) Bradenton, Florida, U.S.
- Height: 5 ft 6 in (1.68 m)

Teri Harrison (born February 16, 1981, in Bradenton, Florida, United States) is an American model and actress. Harrison is Playboy's Playmate of the Month for October 2002. She was photographed by Stephen Wayda.

== November ==
Serria Tawan

Personal details
- Born: September 4, 1978 (age 47) Chicago, Illinois, U.S.
- Height: 5 ft 8 in (1.73 m)

Serria Tawan (born September 4, 1978) is an African-American model and actress. She is Playboy's Playmate of the Month for November 2002, and has appeared in numerous Playboy videos.

== December ==
Lani Todd

Personal details
- Born: June 4, 1981 (age 44) Philadelphia, Pennsylvania, U.S.ef name=deckingly />
- Height: 5 ft 7 in (1.70 m)

Lani Todd (born June 4, 1981) is an American model. She is Playboy's Playmate of the Month for December 2002, and appeared in three Playboy videos.

== See also ==
- List of people in Playboy 2000–2009

Nicole Narain	Anka Romensky	Tina Marie Jordan	Heather Carolin	Christi Shake	Michele Rogers
Lauren Anderson	Christina Santiago	Shallan Meiers	Teri Harrison	Serria Tawan	Lani Todd
