= Josh Strickland =

American entertainer (born 1983)

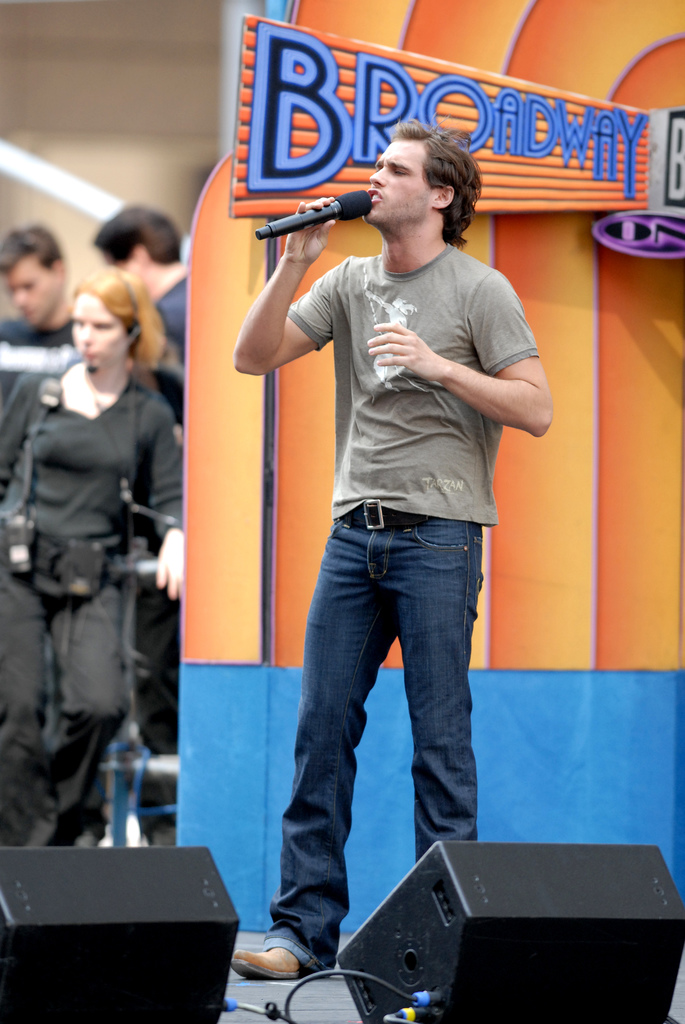
- Strickland in September 2006
- Born: October 23, 1983 (age 42); Charleston, South Carolina
- Occupations: Stage actor, singer
- Website: http://www.joshstrickland.com

Joshua Strickland (born October 23, 1983) is an American singer and actor from Charleston, South Carolina. He attended high school at the Charleston County School of the Arts, where he studied vocal with Robin A. Rogers. He also attended Middleton High School in Charleston for his junior year. He attended the College of Charleston, where he studied voice with Deanna McBroom. During 5th grade, Josh was "discovered" by teacher and Producer/Founder/CEO of The Charleston Youth Company, Chuck Long. He performed with this company for 8 years receiving drama, voice, and dance instruction. This company has been serving the talented students since 1978.

== Career ==
Strickland appeared on season 2 of Fox's American Idol and in March 2007 as himself on All My Children.

He starred as Tarzan in Disney's production of Tarzan on Broadway at the Richard Rodgers Theatre.

The production's run ended after some 14 months and Strickland performed the final show along with the rest of the original cast, minus Shuler Hensley, who had left the production to work on the new Mel Brooks musical Young Frankenstein and was replaced by Rob Evan. The final performance was on July 8, 2007.

In 2009, Strickland became an original cast member of Peepshow in Las Vegas. He has befriended his costar Holly Madison and could be seen regularly in her television reality show Holly's World. He is also a friend of Laura Croft, Miss July 2008 Playboy Playmate as well as stage Actress/Dancer Angel Porrino.

On February 16, 2011, Strickland debuted his first ever solo artist single on iTunes titled "Report to the Floor." The track was co-produced by Grammy Award winning producer Damon Elliott and by Norwegian pop/dance producer Axident. This was closely followed by his second single titled "Last Dance".

As of September 12, 2013, Strickland was cast as one of the lead roles in VEGAS! the Show, performing as Elvis and other iconic artists in the world famous "Vegas themed" musical showing at the Saxe Theater inside Planet Hollywood Resort & Casino's Miracle Mile Shops. Strickland was immediately cast by David Saxe after the closing of Peepshow and subsequently replaced longtime VEGAS! the Show Elvis performer, Lou Gazzara.

== Selected appearances ==
In addition to American Idol and Tarzan, Josh has also appeared in:

- The U.S. national tour of Rent as the understudy for the characters of Mark and Roger
- Carolina Idol 2002
- CBS’s Star Search 2004
- The Spoleto Festival USA as a guest vocalist with jazz musician Kevin Mahogany
- as a guest vocalist with Shania Twain
- Peepshow (2009)
- Disney's Broadway Hits at Royal Albert Hall (2016)
- The Disney Family Singalong: Volume II 2020
