= Casino de Paris =

Musical hall in Paris, France

Coordinates: 48.8783°N 2.33004°E

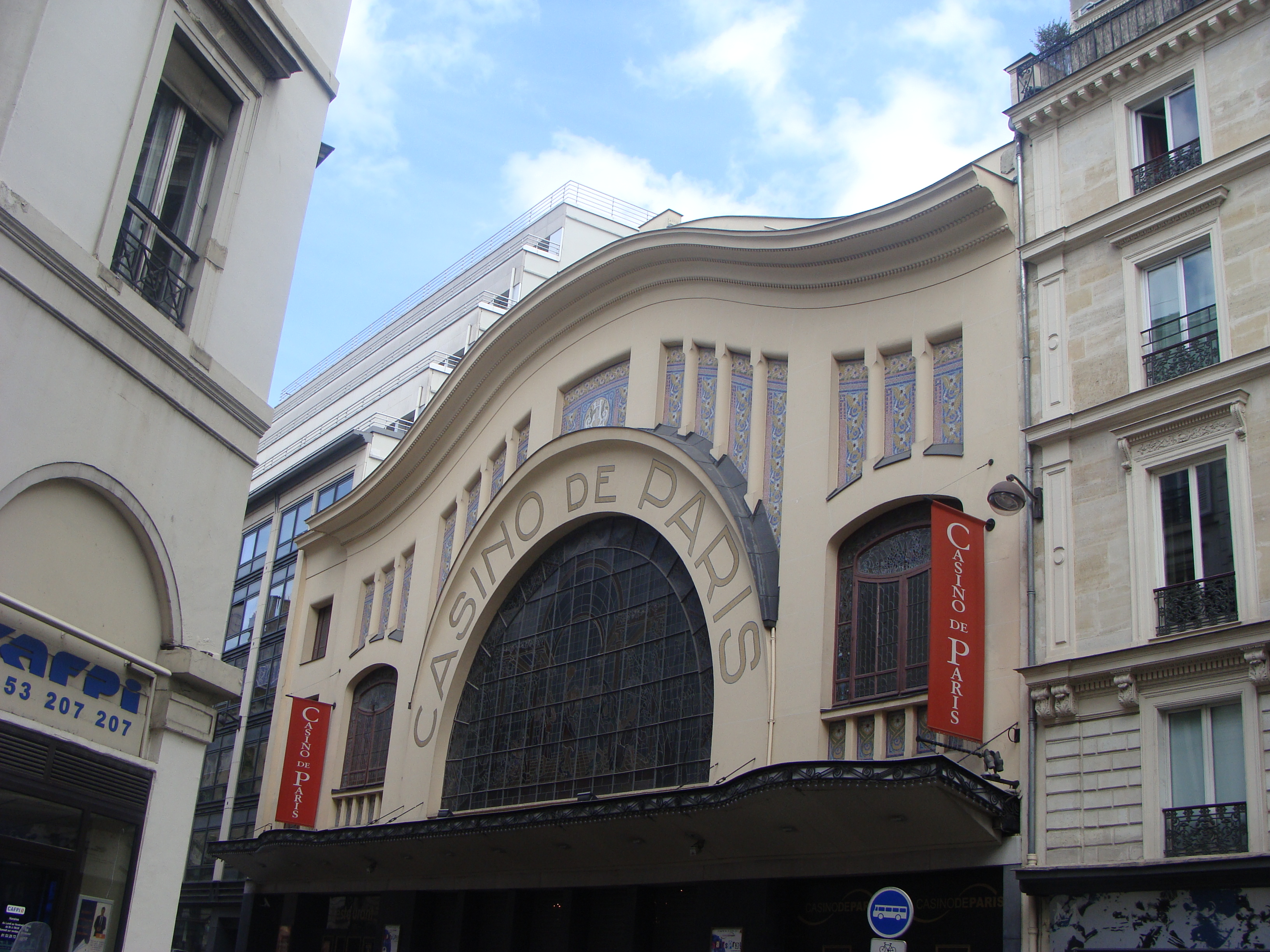
- Main façade, 2011
- Former names: Palace-Théâtre (1880–91)
- Address: 16 Rue de Clichy; 75009 Paris, France
- Location: IX^{e} arrondissement
- Capacity: 2,057

Construction
- Opened: 1880
- Renovated: 1890–91; 1925
- Closed: 1914–18; 1922–25; 1940–44; 1980–82
- Reopened: 17 October 1891
- Architects: Aimé-Louis Sauffroy & Ferdinand Grémailly; Édouard-Jean Niermans (1890–91 renovations); Marcel Oudin (1920s renovations)

Website
- Venue website

The Casino de Paris (French pronunciation: [kazino d(ə) paʁi]), located at 16 Rue de Clichy in the 9th arrondissement, is one of the best-known music halls of Paris. It dates to the 18th century and is a performance venue, not a gambling house.

The closest Métro/RER stations are Liège, Trinité–d'Estienne d'Orves, and Haussmann–Saint-Lazare.

The first building at this location where shows could be mounted was erected by the Duc de Richelieu around 1730, while after the Revolution the site was renamed Jardin de Tivoli and was the venue for fireworks displays. In 1880 it became the Palace Theatre, which housed shows of different types, including wrestling.

At the beginning of the First World War, the modern Casino de Paris began to take shape when the venue was converted into a cinema and music hall. After the war's bombardments interrupted performances, the revue format was resumed, one which lasted through a good part of the twentieth century.

The hall has hosted performances by Mistinguett, Maurice Chevalier, Josephine Baker, Micheline Bernardini, Tino Rossi, Essi Moh, Line Renaud, Shakin' Stevens, OMD, A-ha, Carla Bruni, Georges Guétary, and Zizi Jeanmaire. Writers who have contributed work have included Serge Gainsbourg and Jean Ferrat; Yves Saint Laurent designed for the Casino in the 1970s, and poster artists have included Erté and Jules Chéret.

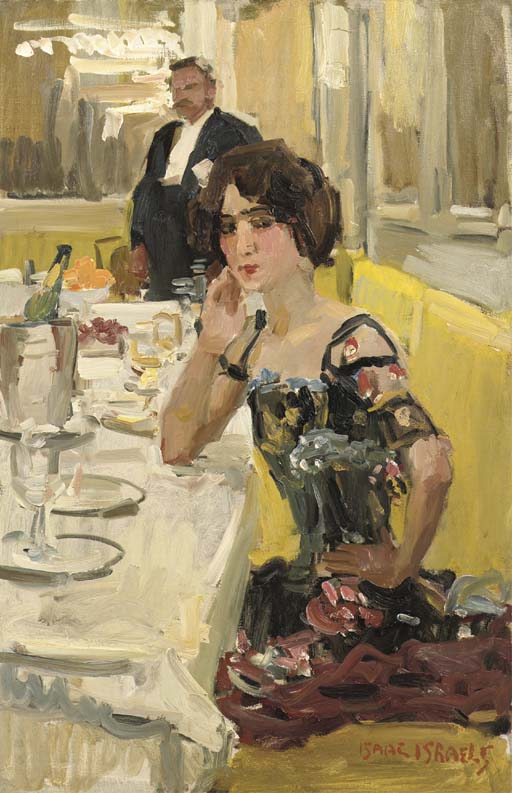
A table at the restaurant Le Perroquet, at the Casino de Paris, by Isaac Israëls, between 1905 and 1923

The restaurant Le Perroquet is on the mezzanine of the foyer under the large glass roof of the Casino de Paris.

== See also ==
- Showgirl
- Iris Mittenaere (Miss Universe 2016)
- fr:Revue (théâtre)
- Revue
- Peepshow

Venues:

- Folies Bergère
- Le Lido
- Minsky's Burlesque
- Moulin Rouge
- Olympia (Paris)
- Paradis Latin
- Tropicana Club
- Stardust Resort and Casino, venue for Lido de Paris and Enter the Night

Theatre groups:

- Cabaret Red Light

Shows:

- Absinthe – a Las Vegas show
- Jubilee! – a revue show in Las Vegas
- Peepshow – a burlesque show in Nevada
- Sirens of TI – a Las Vegas casino show

== Sources ==
- "Plus qu'une salle de spectacles, un des hauts lieux dans l'histoire des revues hautes en couleurs de la capital" from Le Figaro
- "At the Big Casino de Paris" from The New York Times, November 2, 1890
- Costille, Marine (2016). Spectacles au music-hall. Le cas de quatre salles parisiennes, 1917-1940 (in French). École d'Histoire, Université Paris 1 Panthéon-Sorbonne. "Alhambra, Ambassadeurs, fr:Casino de Paris et fr:Folies-Bergères, quatre salles emblématiques dont ce mémoire propose une étude de cas afin de dresser un état des lieux du music-hall parisien entre 1917 et 1940."
