= New Morning (club) =

Jazz club in Paris, France

Coordinates: 48.8730°N 2.3535°E

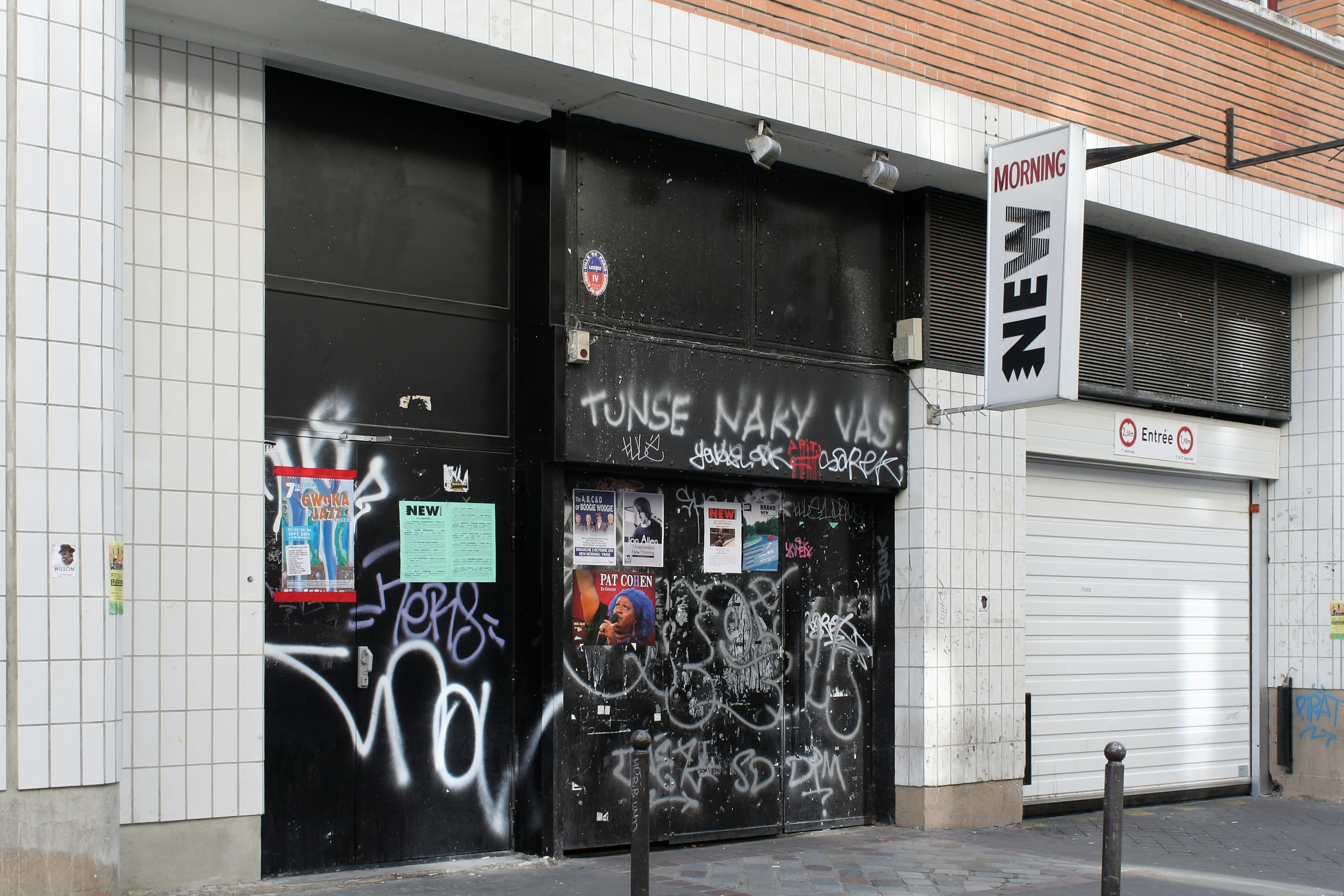
Entrance of New Morning, 7-9 rue des Petites-Écuries

New Morning is a Parisian music nightclub (Rue des Petites Ecuries) that opened in 1981, specializing in jazz and blues. Its concerts are often featured on Mezzo TV.

== History ==
The first concert was given on 16 April 1981 by Art Blakey and the Jazz Messengers. It has also hosted George Russell, Stan Getz, Chet Baker, Robben Ford, Pat Metheny, Charlie Haden, Dizzy Gillespie, Arturo Sandoval, Dexter Gordon, Elvin Jones, Freddie Hubbard, Bobby Hutcherson, Branford Marsalis, Roy Hargrove, Kenny Clarke, Essi Moh, Monty Alexander, and French violinist Didier Lockwood.

Blues musicians who have appeared there include Taj Mahal, Music Maker, Terry Evans, Mighty Mo Rodgers and Roland Tchakounte.

Although mainly a jazz venue, it has also featured Stan Ridgway, Bob Dylan, Prince, Jean-Jacques Goldman, Michel Berger and Elliott Murphy.

Born in Egypt in 1922, Eglal Farhi founded New Morning in 1981. In 2010, Catherine Farhi took over from her mother as the club's director. Eglal died on September 25, 2019, in Neuilly-sur-Seine.

"Madame Farhi passed away a few years ago at the age of 97 and came to many of my shows when she was well into her 90’s," the longtime expatriate American guitarist Elliott Murphy wrote in 2021. "She was a classy, generous and elegant lady – they don’t make them like that anymore."
