= Angel Porrino =

American television personality, actress, dancer and showgirl

- Born: May 6, 1989 (age 36); United States
- Years active: 2008-present
- Known for: Holly's World
- Television: Holly's World
- Height: 5 ft 6 in (1.68 m)
- Spouse: Unknown (2007-2009)
- Children: Roman (son)

Angel Porrino (born May 6, 1989) is an American television personality, actress, dancer and showgirl, best known for appearing on the E! network's reality television show Holly's World as Holly Madison's personal assistant/best friend. She was one of the stars of Absinthe at Caesars Palace, leaving the show in 2014.

== Early life ==
Porrino grew up in Las Vegas. In her youth, she studied modern dance at Preston's Class Act Dance and Gymnastics and Dance Fx of Las Vegas until she was a freshman in high school. She attended Mountain View Christian School where she was a cheerleader and became student body president.

== Personal life ==
She first met Holly Madison (then one of Hugh Hefner's girlfriends) in 2007 when Porrino went to Los Angeles, California, to test for Playboy, as depicted on the television show The Girls Next Door. She was not signed as a Playmate, but her friendship with Madison remained, and she appeared on The Girls Next Door show again in 2008, the only girl there who did not appear in the magazine.

She and her son Roman (born in 2009) lived in Madison's house in Las Vegas as of 2010. Porrino briefly mentioned in Holly's World that she was married to Roman's father, but they later divorced.

For Porrino's 21st birthday, Madison paid for Porrino to undergo surgery in order to enlarge her breasts, reportedly up to three cup sizes larger.

== Career ==
For one week from September 13–19, 2010, Porrino substituted for Madison as Bo Peep in the lead role of Peepshow, a production show at Planet Hollywood Resort and Casino. The show's producers then signed Porrino to a contract under which she filled in for Madison in the lead role for nine weeks during 2011. Porrino returned to the lead role in Peepshow temporarily in 2012 after Madison left the show during her pregnancy.

On April 19, 2011, Porrino debuted a starring role in Spiegelworld's show Absinthe, a carnival burlesque themed show at Caesars Palace, Las Vegas.

Porrino also appeared in the music video "Bad" by The Cab.
