= Aladdin (hotel and casino) =

Historic hotel and casino in Nevada, United States

- Location within Las Vegas Strip Location within Nevada
- Interactive map of Aladdin
- Location: Paradise, Nevada, U.S.; 3667 South Las Vegas Boulevard; 36°06′36″N 115°10′17″W
- Opened: December 24, 1962; 63 years ago (as Tallyho) April 1, 1966; 60 years ago (as Aladdin)
- Closed: November 25, 1997; 28 years ago
- Theme: Arabian
- No. of rooms: 1,100
- Gaming space: 37,000 sq ft (3,400 m^{2})
- Signature attractions: Aladdin Theatre for the Performing Arts
- Notable restaurants: Continental; Hickory Grill; The Oasis Coffeehouse; Genie Buffet; Fishery; The Deli
- Owner: Aladdin Holdings
- Architect: Homer Rissman,Lee Linton,Martin Stern Jr.
- Previous names: Tallyho (1962–64); King's Crown Tallyho (1964–66)
- Renovated in: 1964, 1966, 1969, 1972, 1975–76

The Aladdin was a hotel and casino located on the Las Vegas Strip in Paradise, Nevada. Toy manufacturer Edwin S. Lowe originally opened the 450-room Tallyho Hotel on the property in 1962. The Tallyho was the only major hotel in Nevada to not include a casino; it closed at the end of the year and was sold to Kings Crown Inns of America, a hotel chain which reopened the property a month later as the King's Crown Tallyho. The company added a casino and showroom but plans to open the casino were halted when the Nevada Gaming Control Board declined to issue a gambling license because of concerns about the resort being inadequately financed.

Milton Prell purchased the hotel and began an extensive $3 million renovation of the property before reopening it as the Aladdin on April 1, 1966. A 19-story hotel tower was added in 1976. After various ownership changes, the Aladdin was closed in 1997 and demolished the following year to make room for a new Aladdin resort that opened in 2000.

== History ==
=== Tallyho (1962–1963) ===
The English Tudor-styled Tallyho hotel was conceived by owner Edwin S. Lowe, a New York toy manufacturer who also served as the president of the hotel. Lowe, who believed that there were some Las Vegas tourists who were not interested in gambling, chose not to add a casino to the Tallyho. The hotel was built on the Las Vegas Strip, across the street from the Dunes resort. Construction of the Tallyho was underway in March 1962, with an opening planned for July. In May 1962, the Clark County Ground Water Board denied an application for a water well that would be used for a nine-hole pitch and putt golf course, which Lowe planned to construct at the rear of the property. A nine-hole golf course was ultimately added to the final plans.

In June 1962, the hotel's opening was delayed until October 1, 1962. Simultaneously, county officials discovered that the three-story stucco hotel may be in violation of fire codes. A request was made for the owner to propose plans to fireproof the hotel's wooden roof and attic. County officials suggested the installation of either a sprinkler system or sheet rock in the attic, as well as the addition of fire-proof materials on the roof of the hotel structures. In November 1962, key positions in the resort were being named while an opening date of Christmas week was being planned.

The Tallyho Hotel and Country Club opened on December 24, 1962, at a cost of $12 million. Grand opening celebrations were held in February 1963. It was the only major resort in Nevada to not include a casino. The hotel featured 450 rooms, 32 villas, six restaurants, horseback and bicycle-riding facilities, and a helicopter service to take guests to nearby attractions such as Mount Charleston and Lake Mead. Despite the lack of a casino, the business was operating successfully at the time of its opening. However, the Tallyho closed on October 10, 1963, because of low revenue caused by the lack of a casino. The closure affected 100 employees, and Lowe conceded that it was a mistake to not open the hotel with an adjoining casino.

=== King's Crown Tallyho (1963–1966) ===
Kings Crown Inns of America, Incorporated, a chain of hotels, purchased the Tallyho at a cost of $7 million, and reopened it as the King's Crown Tallyho on November 5, 1963. Kings Crown planned to add a casino and showroom as soon as possible. The Tallyho was Kings Crown's first hotel in the western United States.

Lighting and sound system details for the showroom were being finalized in March 1964, while Kings Crown planned to have the showroom opened in the summer. Sound men who designed the showroom consulted with sound engineers at the University of California, Los Angeles. Film producer Steve Parker, husband of actress Shirley MacLaine, was named as the head of the hotel's showroom, to be named the Crown Room Theater-Restaurant. In addition, Parker was named as a part owner in the resort. In April 1964, a fire started in one of the hotel rooms and caused smoke damage to part of the hotel. The fire was believed to have been started by a cigarette.

Groundbreaking ceremonies for the casino and showroom were scheduled for the weekend of April 11–12, 1964. Celebrities, including MacLaine, were expected to attend the ceremonies. Other additions in the $3 million expansion project would include a convention hall and another restaurant. Future plans included the addition of a 15-story hotel structure with 500 rooms. Construction of the casino and showroom was underway in May 1964, while Parker was planning a show that would feature non-topless showgirls, a concept that was not present in other showgirl shows in Las Vegas.

By the end of 1964, a partnership of six corporations, with a total of 17 stockholders, was seeking a gambling license to open the casino as part of a $500,000 investment. On December 22, 1964, the Nevada Gaming Control Board deferred action on the approval of a gambling license until the following month to allow time for an investigation of the partnership's finances. A New Year's Eve opening date had been planned for the casino, while the possibility remained for a showroom lounge and two new restaurants to open at that time, although they ultimately did not. A total of 500 people were expected to be employed at the resort's new facilities. In January 1965, the Gaming Board considered the request for a gambling license, but agreed to the hotel's request to delay action for another 30 days so financial agreements could be worked out between people in the partnership. By that time, the partnership consisted of 18 people with a total investment of $800,000.

In February 1965, as the Gaming Board was considering the issuance of a gambling license, the hotel submitted multiple partnership changes that would include increasing Parker's ownership from eight percent to twenty percent. The Gaming Board deferred action on the gambling license until the following month. Board member W. E. Leypoldt said, "I don't think it's fair to ask us to act on something that's entirely different from what was presented Monday. It would do the casino industry a great deal of harm if you opened and in six months went broke because of lack of financing."

The request for a gambling license was withdrawn in March 1965, to allow more time to reorganize the partnership. Later that month, a suit was filed by Kings Crown Tallyho Inn Incorporated, Equitable Real Estate Investment Trust, and Fidelity Real Estate Investment Trust, all of which requested that the present leasees of the hotel be removed for not paying $632,000 in rent and other payments. The companies stated that other groups were interested in taking over the resort as soon as the leasees, including Chuck Luftig and Edward Nealis, could be removed.

Phone service to the hotel was cut off in April 1965, due to unpaid phone bills dating back to January. All 50 non-permanent guests were asked to leave the hotel. Luftig and Nealis were removed as lessees at the end of the month, after a judge ruled that the hotel be vacated and returned to Kings Crown. The next month, Luftig and Nealis asked for a $3.3 million judgment, alleging that Kings Crown failed to finish necessary improvements to the property during the period of August 1964 to January 1965, leading to financial losses.

=== Aladdin (1966–1998) ===
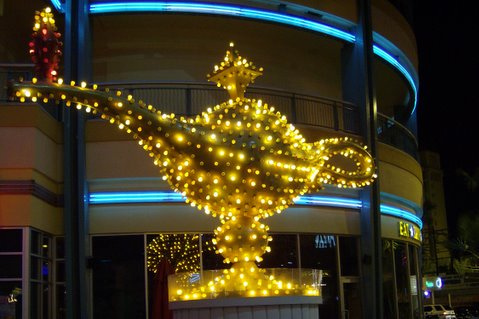
The original Aladdin's Lamp in 2008, now part of the Neon Museum

On January 1, 1966, Milton Prell agreed to purchase the King's Crown Tallyho, which was owned by three trusts overseen by the Cook brothers of Indiana. Prell agreed to purchase the resort for $10 million, which would be delivered in monthly payments.

Prell announced plans to remove the old English theme and reopen the resort as the Oriental-themed Aladdin on April 16 following an extensive $3 million renovation. Prell also planned to construct a $20 million, 40-story hotel addition with 600 rooms. Construction of the high-rise was expected to begin later in the year. Martin Stern Jr. was the architect for the Aladdin project, while R. C. Johnson and Associates was the contractor and was hired to construct new facilities and renovate existing structures. Renovation plans included the remodeling of the showroom and lounge, as well as the casino and the hotel's front side. Elevators and escalators were also installed at the hotel's two main front entrances. The original English-themed room wings were kept, but received an Arabian Nights theme along with the rest of the resort. The Aladdin was named after the character of the same name. A serrated canopy was added along with a $750,000, 15-foot "Aladdin's Lamp" sign.

Two weeks after Prell took over the property, a new opening date of April 1 was announced due to the fast progress of renovations, while construction of the high-rise was expected to begin in the fall. Later in the month, Prell requested a gambling license to operate 27 table games and 350 slot machines, with casino operations to be financed at a cost of $400,000 through Prell and his partners, Gil Gilbert and Sidney Krystal. Prell owned a 20-percent interest in the hotel corporation, while Gilberts, the corporate vice president, held five percent and Krystal, secretary-treasurer, had seven percent. A large group of investors owned the remaining stock. Prell named Joe Rollo and Bernie Richards, both of Beverly Hills, to serve as entertainment director and head of orchestrations respectively. The Gaming Board recommended approval of Prell's request for a gambling license in February 1966. Prell was approved the next month for gaming and liquor licenses, with approval to operate 351 slot machines and 29 table games.

==== Opening and ownership changes ====
The resort opened as Milton Prell's Aladdin at midnight on April 1, 1966, becoming the first major resort to open on the Las Vegas Strip in nine years. The Aladdin included the largest casino on the Las Vegas Strip and the 500-seat Bagdad Theatre. People present at the grand opening included Prell and his wife, as well as County Commission Chairman William H. Briare, Las Vegas mayor Oran K. Gragson, and Las Vegas Sun publisher Hank Greenspun. The Aladdin, located on 35 acres (14 ha), included a golf course and five dining facilities. A week after opening, the sign for the Dunes casino welcomed the Aladdin and wished the new resort "good luck." The Aladdin was considered one of the most luxurious resorts on the Las Vegas Strip, although profits were usually low. Construction of the high-rise hotel addition was scheduled to begin in October 1966.

In September 1966, nine people – including Prell's daughter Sheila – were approved to invest $287,500 for a combined 11.5 percent interest in the Aladdin. At the end of 1966, Prell stopped making payments to the trusts, stating he could not afford the overall $10 million sale price. The trusts agreed to reduce the sale price to $5 million, and Prell's purchase of the property was completed on February 9, 1967. Prell Hotel Corporation was the new owner.

In May 1967, the Aladdin was host to Elvis and Priscilla Presley's wedding.

In 1968, MK Investment Corporation made a failed offer to purchase the Aladdin. Renovations totaling $750,000 were completed in August 1969, which included making the Sinbad Lounge enclosed and leveled above the casino floor with Arabic motif.

In 1969, Parvin Dohrmann Corporation took over the Aladdin, and the company was renamed as Recrion Corporation. In February 1971, a group led by Las Vegas resident Walter Gardner agreed to purchase the Aladdin at a cost of $16.5 million. The sale was to be completed once the new owners received licensing to operate the Aladdin's casino. Recrion's agreement with Gardner required that the sale be completed by May 15, 1971. Gardner was a former executive at the Binion's Horseshoe in downtown Las Vegas, and his group included six unnamed investors. In May 1971, Recrion granted the group an extension in order to raise the money to complete the purchase. The deal was cancelled later in the month after Gardner failed to make the purchase, which resulted in Recrion filing a $250,000 suit against Gardner.

By the end of 1971, Recrion was planning a $5 million sale of the Aladdin, which would help pay off the resort's debts. The Aladdin was sold to Sam Diamond, St. Louis politicians Peter Webbe and Sorkis Webbe, and St. Louis attorney Richard L. Daly for $5 million. The new owners announced plans for the $25 million, 24-story, 800-room Regency Tower, to be built adjacent to the Aladdin and expected to be opened in late 1973. Under the new owners, a $60 million face lift was conducted, including the addition of a 17-story tower and the new 7,500-seat Performing Arts Center replacing the golf course, which was $4 million over budget.

Construction began on the 19-story "Tower of Majesty" in May 1975. It was designed by Lee Linton, and built by the Del E. Webb Corporation. The tower opened on June 1, 1976.

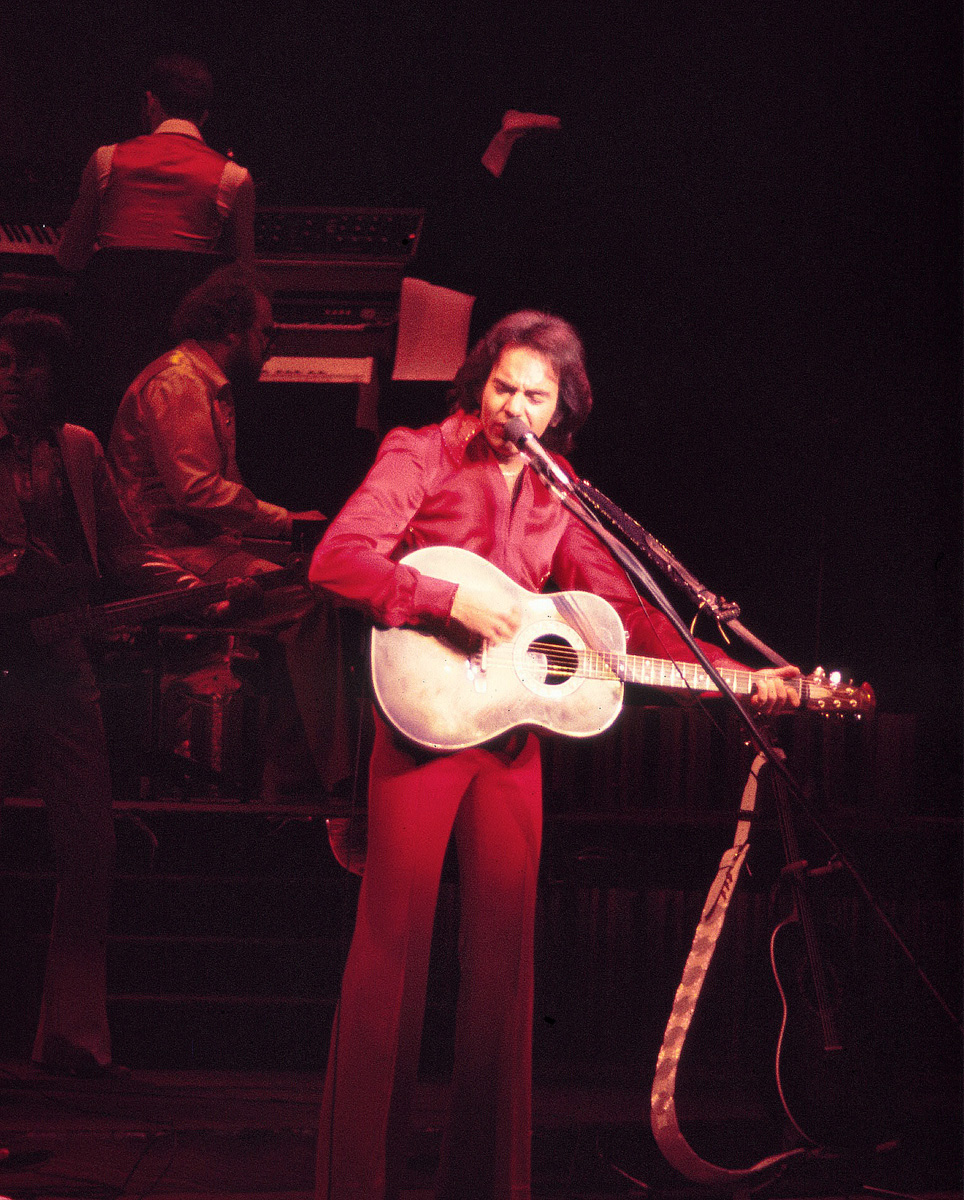
Neil Diamond performing at the Aladdin Theatre for the Performing Arts on July 2, 1976

A $250,000 porte-cochere continued the tower's arabesques. The Aladdin added a new $300,000 140-foot (43 m) blockbuster sign with little neon, huge attraction panels and none of the arabesque of the Aladdin's original sign. The Aladdin celebrated the grand opening of their new "Aladdin Theatre for the Performing Arts" with singer Neil Diamond being paid $650,000 for four shows; July 2 through July 5, 1976. In 1981, heavy metal band Iron Maiden played at the Aladdin – it was their first-ever concert in America.

In August 1979, several individuals were convicted by a Detroit Federal Jury of conspiring to allow hidden owners to exert control over the resort, and the Nevada Gaming Commission then closed the hotel.

The resort was sold to Wayne Newton and Ed Torres in 1980 for $85 million, snubbing an offer from comedian Johnny Carson. Newton sold his share to Torres 21 months later. Newton sued NBC, who had alleged in broadcasts, that his purchase of the Aladdin was tied to the mafia. He won a $22.8 million judgement, which was overturned on appeal. In February 1984, the Aladdin went into Chapter 11 bankruptcy.

In 1986, Japanese businessman Ginji Yasuda purchased the Aladdin out of bankruptcy for $54 million. Yasuda spent an additional $35 million to refurbish the resort. Yasuda was removed as the casino's operator by state regulators in September 1988. Yasuda placed the resort in Chapter 11 bankruptcy in October 1989, and died two months later. The property was publicly put up for sale in 1990, after months of unsuccessful private attempts to locate a buyer.

The New Jersey–based Bell Atlantic-Tricon Leasing Corporation acquired the resort out of bankruptcy from Ginji Corporation in 1991. That year, Bell Atlantic-Tricon put the property up for sale at a minimum price of $44 million. In January 1994, businessman and eventual future President Donald Trump considered purchasing the Aladdin for $51 million, although Bell Atlantic-Tricon declined to sell the property for less than $60 million. Trump decided not to purchase the Aladdin as he felt the price was too high. Interest in the property increased following the news of Trump's potential purchase, with several prospective buyers emerging. At the time, the resort consisted of a 1,000-room hotel and a 37,000 square-foot casino. Later in 1994, Jack Sommer, a Las Vegas real estate developer, and the Sommer Family Trust purchased the hotel. The Sommer Family Trust owned the Aladdin through Aladdin Gaming Corporation – which also operated the resort – and Aladdin Holdings LLC. A pair of endangered peregrine falcons nested on the hotel tower during the mid-1990s.

In May 1996, plans were approved by the Clark County Commission for a $600 million renovation and expansion of the Aladdin, which had 1,100 hotel rooms at the time. Sommer and the county spent six months working on the design of the project, which would retain the original hotel tower and theater. The expansion would include four new hotel towers, including a centerpiece 400-foot-high rectangular tower. Other additions would include a 256-room timeshare condominium, a 300-room hotel-casino, and a shopping mall that would be co-managed by Eddie DeBartolo. The hotel would continue operations during the expansion project, which was expected to take 24 to 30 months. On December 6, 1996, American psychedelic rock band Phish performed at the Aladdin, marking the first appearance in Las Vegas by the band. The performance was ultimately released as a CD/DVD release entitled Vegas 96. The concert featured a guest appearance by members of the band Primus and a group of Elvis impersonators.

In January 1997, Aladdin Gaming Corporation announced that London Clubs International would invest $50 million for a 25 percent interest in the Aladdin resort. London Clubs planned to add a luxury gaming facility to the Aladdin, aimed at attracting high rollers. The new facility would include 30 gaming tables and 100 slot machines. It would be part of the two-year renovation and expansion project, which was expected to cost $750 million and was scheduled to begin later in 1997. The new gaming facility would feature a European design. The Aladdin had been struggling to compete against larger resorts on the Las Vegas Strip.

In March 1997, Aladdin Holdings announced that the resort would add a 450,000 sq ft (42,000 m^{2}) shopping mall as part of the expansion project. It would feature the Aladdin's Arabian theme and was expected to open in 1999, with TrizecHahn Corporation handling construction, leasing, and operations. The mall, to be known as Desert Passage, was expected to cost $210 million. For the expansion project, Jack Sommer considered various options, which included closing the resort to renovate it, and demolishing the resort entirely to build a new one.

==== Closure and demolition ====
On September 25, 1997, it was announced that the Aladdin would close in two months and eventually be demolished to make room for a new Aladdin resort that would be three times larger than the original, and would include the Desert Passage mall. The Aladdin had 1,485 employees, while the new resort would employ over 7,000 people. The Aladdin's 7,000-seat Theater for the Performing Arts would be retained and modernized for the new resort. Among the final performances in the Aladdin theater was Jane's Addiction.

The Aladdin closed at 6:00 p.m. on November 25, 1997. Few casino guests expressed sadness about the closure. The Aladdin theater hosted its final performance later that night, with a show by Mötley Crüe. The performance turned chaotic when the band encouraged the audience to stand up, as one person tried to grab the hat worn by guitarist Mick Mars, accidentally knocking him down. Demolition was expected to begin in December 1997, and an implosion of the hotel tower was expected to occur in February 1998. The Aladdin's porte cochere contained 9,230 light bulbs, which cost a total of $23,499 to light up during 1997. In February 1998, Aladdin Gaming announced that it had financed plans for the new Aladdin resort, expected to cost $826 million. National Content Liquidators conducted an on-site liquidation sale of the Aladdin beginning on March 6, 1998.

On April 27, 1998, the hotel tower was imploded at 7:27 p.m. to make way for construction of the new Aladdin resort. It was the fifth Las Vegas resort to be imploded. The tower was imploded by Controlled Demolition, Inc., who had handled every hotel implosion on the Strip to this point. According to company president Mark Loizeaux, the tower used a poor concrete block design. He said, "This is the worst construction I've ever seen. It's shoddy. It's a poor man's high-rise. It is extremely susceptible to collapse. It is not a building I'd want to be in in an earthquake". The design meant that bringing down the tower in the implosion would be easy, but it also posed a challenge for getting the building to come down in the right direction. Because the tower would be easy to bring down during the implosion, Loizeaux decreased the amount of explosives from 370 pounds to 232 pounds.

An estimated 20,000 people arrived to watch the implosion from nearby. Aladdin executives set up a 1,000-person tent near the Aladdin and charged $250 a ticket for people to watch the implosion from inside the tent, with the proceeds benefiting the Make-A-Wish Foundation of Southern Nevada. The old resort's sign read, "Out of the dust Aladdin rises anew. See you in 2000." Frank Wright, the curator of the Nevada State Museum, said about the Aladdin's lack of success: "I don't know why it never made it. It never had the glamour of the Sands or the exotic dancers of the Tropicana or the Dunes or Stardust. Maybe it was location, but the Hacienda was farther out, and it was a success." Don Payne, the former chief of the Las Vegas News Bureau, said the Aladdin "certainly couldn't match the Flamingo or the Dunes. It never had the big name entertainment policy. It didn't have the advertising the big guys had. But it was a well-thought-of place."

=== New resort (since 2000) ===
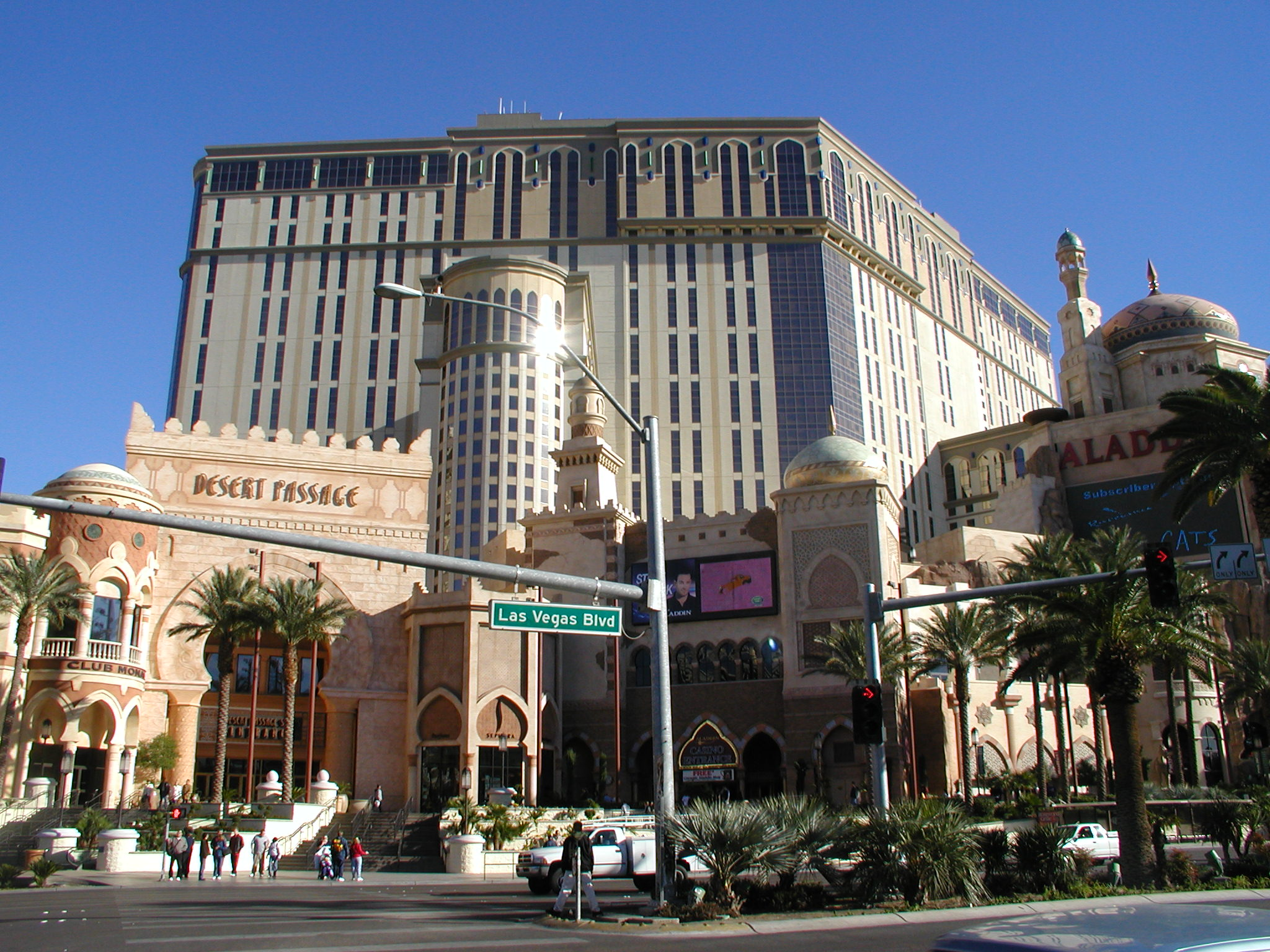
The new Aladdin in 2005 before being rebranded as Planet Hollywood

The new Aladdin resort opened in August 2000. It experienced financial problems and entered Chapter 11 bankruptcy protection in September 2001. In February 2002, Aladdin Gaming was searching for potential buyers. The resort was sold in bankruptcy on June 20, 2003 to a partnership of Planet Hollywood and Starwood. After a renovation, the resort began operating in 2007 under the name "Planet Hollywood".

== Film history ==
Robert Hirsch, a Las Vegas location consultant and the former director of the Nevada Motion Picture Division, said that film and television crews "always loved the porte cochere" of the Aladdin, but that they "just didn't like the rest of the place." The Aladdin's casino was featured substantially in the 1979 film Going in Style and the 1986 film Heat. The porte cochere and casino appeared in the 1993 film, Best of the Best II, while the theatre appeared in the 1997 documentary film, Dancing for Dollars. Behind Closed Doors, a documentary series, shot footage of the hotel tower's demolition preparations prior to its implosion. The series also placed cameras inside the tower to give an interior view of the building during the implosion. The Aladdin was also featured in a 1998 episode of Ohh Nooo! Mr. Bill Presents, in which the character of Mr. Bill performs at the resort. Footage of the implosion was used in Gambling, Gods and LSD (2002), in the closing credits of the 2003 film The Cooler and in the 2021 film The Misfits.

== See also ==
- List of casinos in Nevada
