= Planet Hollywood Las Vegas =

Casino resort in Paradise, Nevada

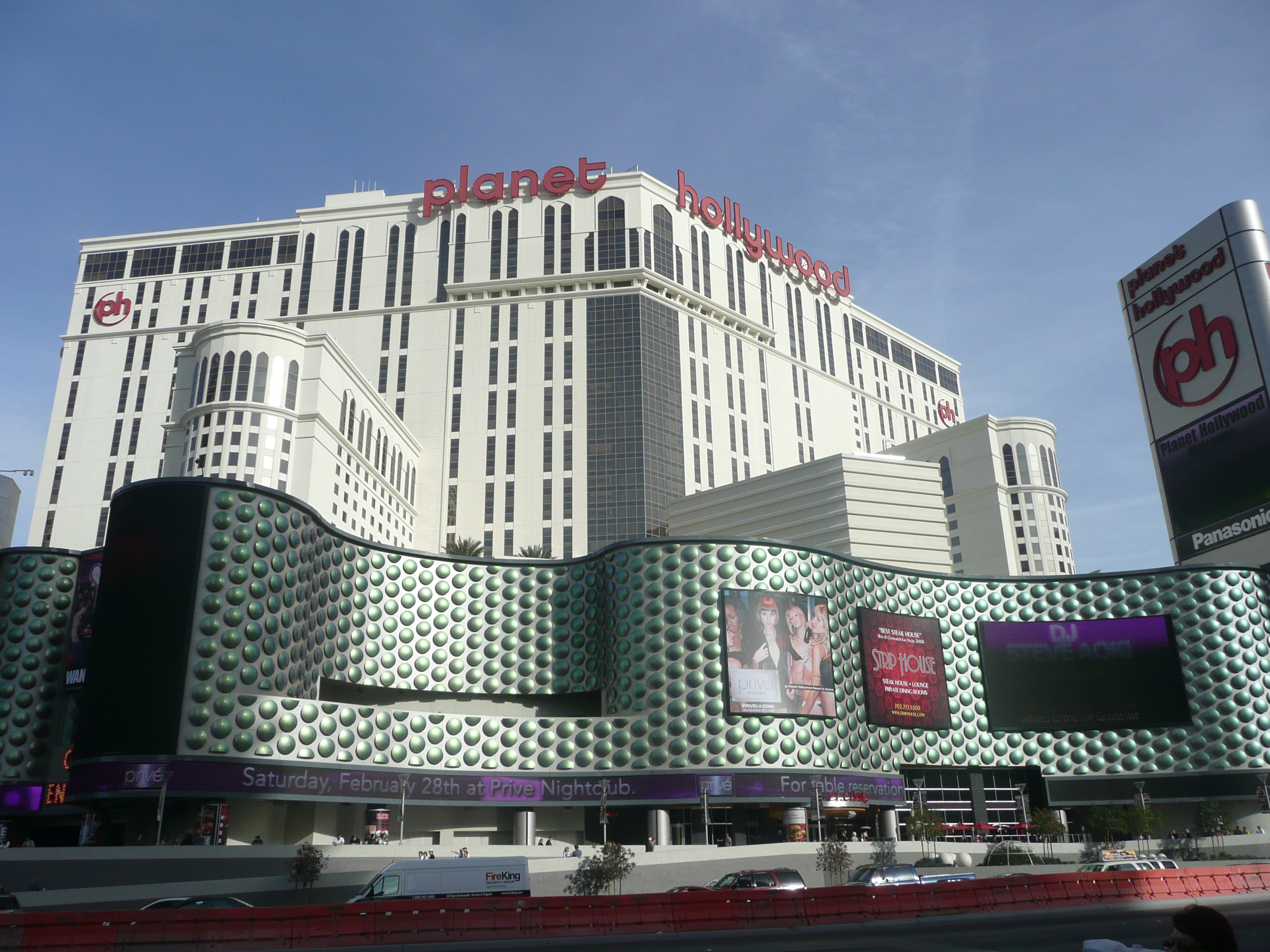
- Planet Hollywood Las Vegas in 2009

- Location within Las Vegas Strip Location within Nevada
- Interactive map of Planet Hollywood Las Vegas
- Location: Paradise, Nevada, United States; 3667 South Las Vegas Boulevard; 36°06′36″N 115°10′17″W
- Opened: August 18, 2000; 26 years ago (as Aladdin)
- Theme: Hollywood; Arabian (formerly, as Aladdin)
- No. of rooms: 2,496
- Gaming space: 68,600 sq ft (6,370 m^{2})
- Permanent shows: Criss Angel MINDFREAK; Chippendales
- Signature attractions: PH Live
- Notable restaurants: Caramella; Gordon Ramsay Burger
- Owner: Caesars Entertainment
- Previous names: Aladdin (2000–2007)
- Renovated in: 2005–2007, 2017
- Website: caesars.com/planet-hollywood

Planet Hollywood Las Vegas (formerly the Aladdin) is a casino resort on the Las Vegas Strip in Paradise, Nevada, United States. It is owned and operated by Caesars Entertainment. The resort includes approximately 68,600 sq ft (6,370 m^{2}) of casino space and about 2,500 hotel rooms and suites. It also features PH Live, a 7,000-seat entertainment venue.

The current resort was built on the site of the original Aladdin, an Arabian-themed hotel and casino that operated from 1966 to 1997. Real estate developer Jack Sommer demolished the original resort in 1998 to make way for a new version, with London Clubs International as his partner. The new Aladdin opened on August 18, 2000. It faced immediate financial difficulties and filed for Chapter 11 bankruptcy in September 2001.

Planet Hollywood International and Starwood Hotels acquired the resort in 2004 and launched a renovation to convert it into Planet Hollywood, a project completed in 2007. The resort later suffered further financial difficulties amid the Great Recession, and Harrah's Entertainment, later renamed Caesars Entertainment, took ownership in 2010.

== History ==
=== Predecessor resorts (1962–1998) ===
The site was originally developed as the Tallyho Hotel by Edwin S. Lowe, a businessman and toy manufacturer. The hotel opened in December 1962 and was unusual among major Nevada resorts of the period because it did not include a casino. The lack of casino revenue contributed to the property's closure in 1963. It was subsequently sold and reopened as the King's Crown Tallyho. Plans to add a casino were delayed and later abandoned after the Nevada Gaming Control Board raised concerns about the property's financing.

Casino operator Milton Prell purchased the property and renovated it with an Arabian theme, reopening it as the Aladdin on April 1, 1966. The resort included a casino, dining venues, a showroom, and a golf course. It later became known for several notable events, including the 1967 wedding of Elvis Presley and Priscilla Beaulieu.

The Aladdin experienced financial difficulties and several ownership changes during its history. In 1994, it was purchased by Las Vegas real estate developer Jack Sommer and the Sommer Family Trust. Sommer later partnered with London Clubs International through Aladdin Gaming, and plans were announced in 1997 to replace the resort with a larger version. The Aladdin closed on November 25, 1997, and its hotel tower was imploded on April 27, 1998. The Aladdin Theatre for the Performing Arts, now PH Live, was retained and incorporated into the new resort.

=== New Aladdin (1998–2007) ===
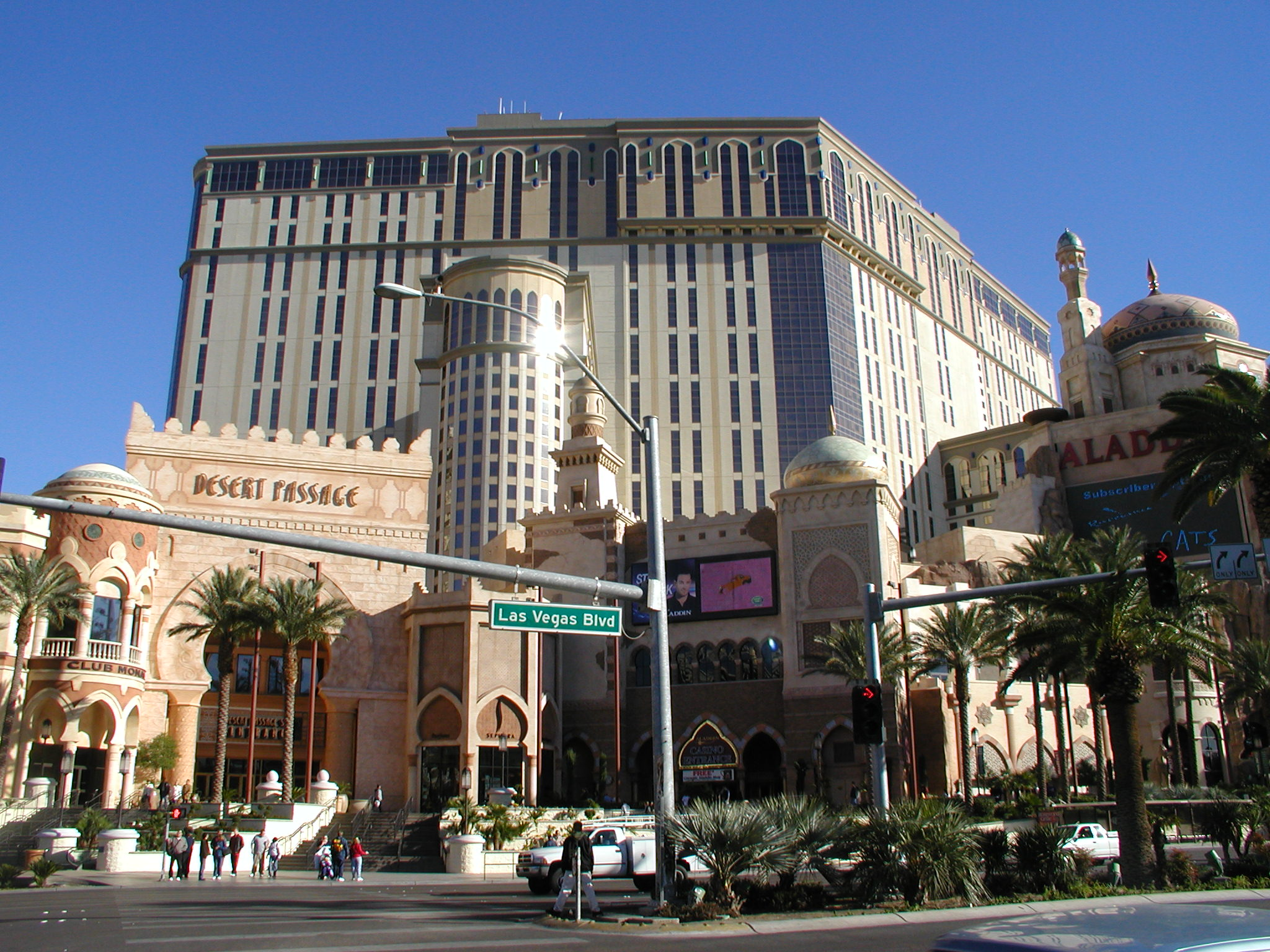
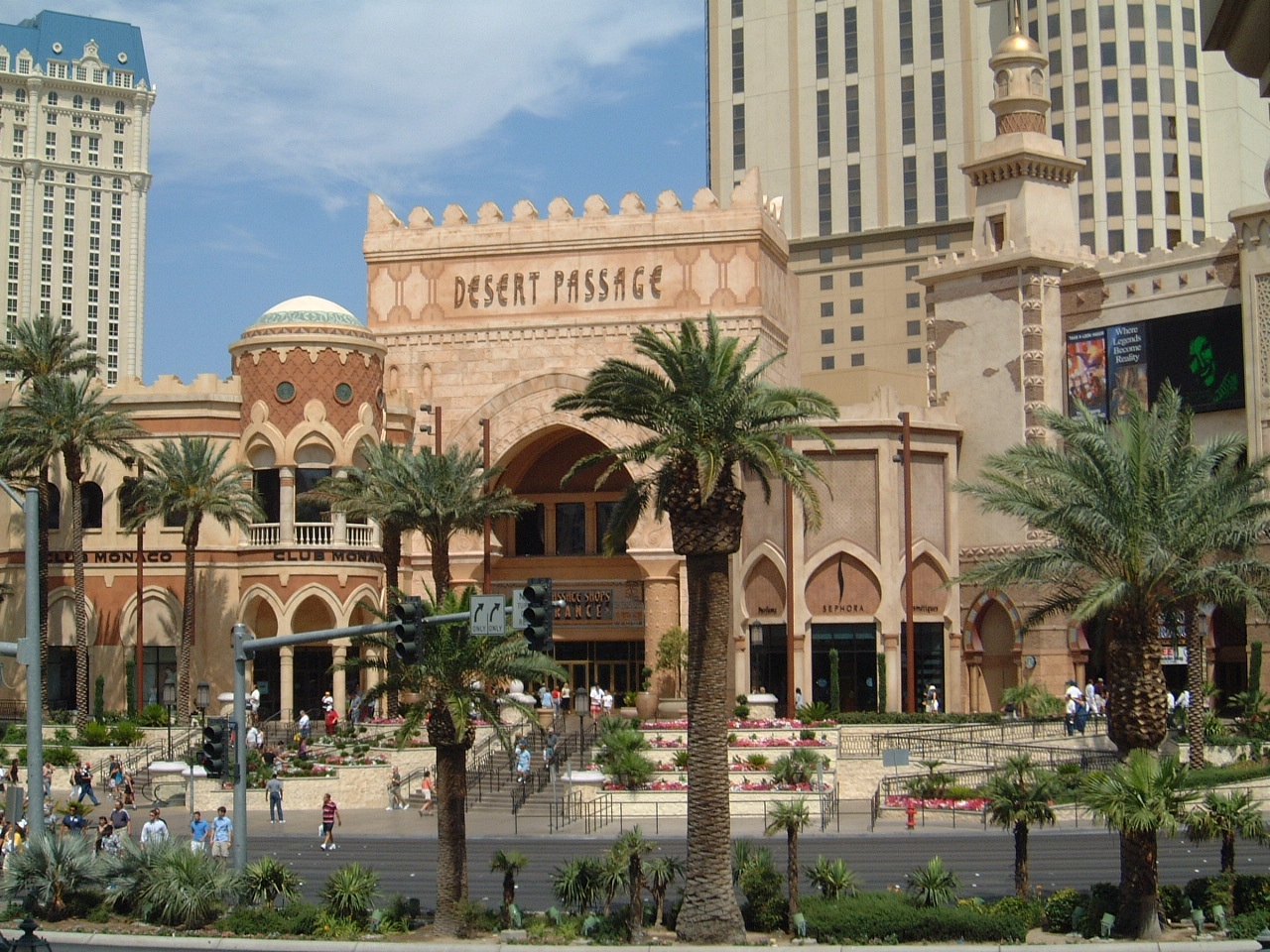
The Aladdin entrance and Desert Passage along the Strip

Fluor Corporation was hired to design and build the new Aladdin. In February 1998, Aladdin Gaming finalized an $826 million financing plan for the resort. Planet Hollywood International also planned to develop a music-themed resort, Sound Republic, behind the Aladdin, although the project was canceled later that year after Aladdin Gaming ended its partnership with the company.

The cost of the Aladdin project eventually rose to $1.4 billion, partly because of design changes that included a larger pool area and moving the resort closer to the Las Vegas Strip sidewalk. The total did not include the adjacent Desert Passage shopping center, which was separately owned.

The Aladdin opened on August 18, 2000, a day later than planned because of delays related to fire safety testing. The resort faced immediate financial problems. Analysts and former executives later cited several design and marketing issues, including poor foot traffic caused by an elevated casino floor, an entrance that was considered uninviting and easy to miss, and an interior layout that allowed mall and restaurant visitors to bypass the casino. The resort also lacked an established hotel reservation network, a database of gamblers, and sufficient funds for an aggressive pre-opening marketing campaign.

The September 11 attacks in 2001 worsened the resort's financial problems, leading to layoffs and a Chapter 11 bankruptcy filing later that month.

=== Planet Hollywood (2007–present) ===
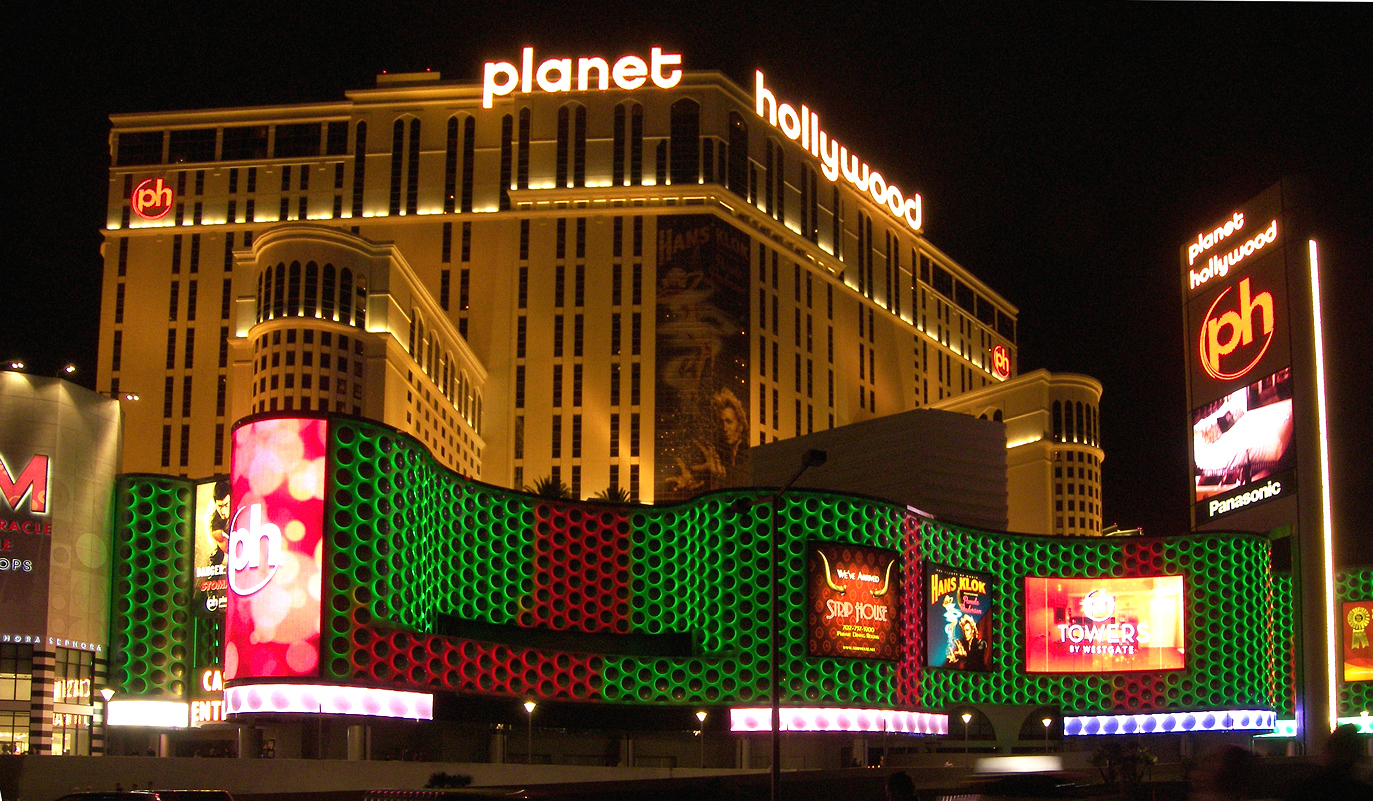
Planet Hollywood, November 2007

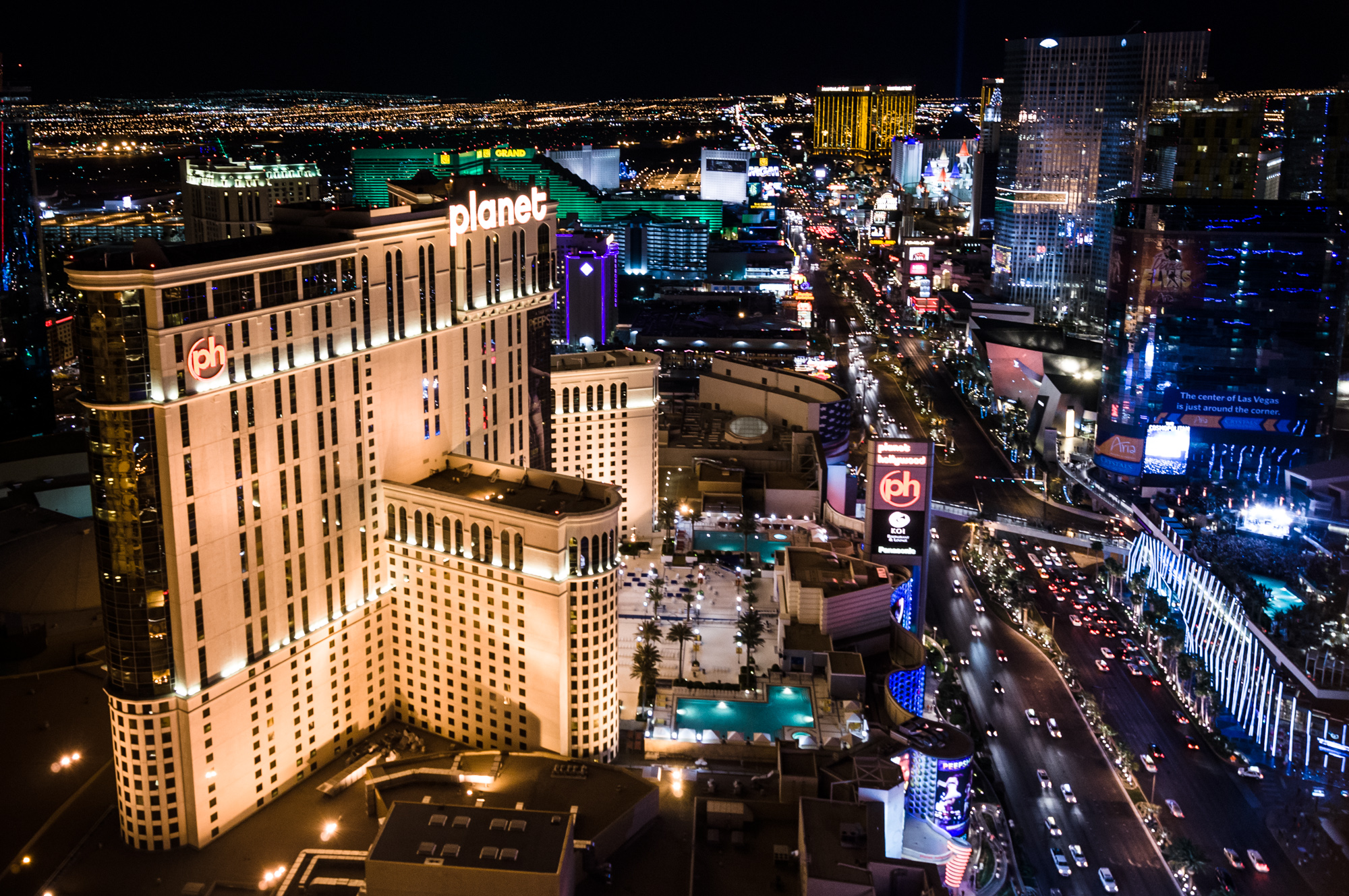
View from the Eiffel Tower replica at the adjacent Paris Las Vegas, 2012

In April 2003, an agreement was reached to sell the Aladdin to OpBiz, a partnership between Planet Hollywood International, Starwood Hotels, and Bay Harbour Management, for $635 million. The new owners planned to renovate and rebrand the property as Planet Hollywood. Starwood, with a 15-percent ownership stake, was to manage hotel operations. Planet Hollywood had previously considered building a Las Vegas resort on the site of the Desert Inn during the mid-1990s.

The sale of the Aladdin was finalized on September 1, 2004, with renovations beginning 13 months later. Renovations occurred in phases to keep the resort operational. Although initially expected to be completed by 2005, challenges such as renovating while operational and lengthy permitting processes delayed the project. The redesign included a Times Square-inspired facade with LED screens and escalators leading to the casino entrance. The separately owned Desert Passage mall was also renovated, and renamed Miracle Mile Shops.

The name change to Planet Hollywood became effective on April 17, 2007, and the grand opening occurred on November 16, 2007, featuring celebrity performances. The resort showcased a modern design with a Hollywood theme, including celebrity-named penthouses available to the public when not in use.

Planet Hollywood International, founded by Robert Earl, had faced financial difficulties, and the resort was intended as a comeback. However, the Great Recession impacted the resort's finances. In 2009, Harrah's Entertainment purchased part of the $860 million mortgage, and took full ownership in February 2010. With the acquisition and its other properties, Harrah's had control of 126 acres (0.51 km^{2}) on the east side of the Strip between Flamingo Road and Harmon Avenue. Harrah's later rebranded as Caesars Entertainment.

A $100 million renovation of the resort's 2,496 hotel rooms and suites was completed in 2017.

The casino's poker room closed on July 11, 2021. A new 23-table poker room opened on the mezzanine level on May 9, 2025. Caesars announced that the room would cease operations after January 31, 2026, with poker operations consolidated at Caesars Palace and Horseshoe Las Vegas.

== Union dispute ==
When the Aladdin opened in 2000, it was one of the few nonunion resorts on the Strip, along with the Venetian and the Imperial Palace. The Culinary Workers Union represented most resort workers on the Strip and opposed the Aladdin opening as a nonunion property. Resort executives said they were neutral regarding union representation and sought to resolve the dispute through a secret ballot, while the union favored a card check.

A protest with approximately 1,000 union members took place in front of the Aladdin on the night of its planned opening, although the group dispersed after several hours once the opening was delayed. Another protest took place in 2003, with Culinary seeking to unionize 1,500 of the resort's 2,300 employees. That year, the Culinary Workers Union and Bartenders Union Local 165 brought unfair labor practice charges against Aladdin Gaming before the National Labor Relations Board.

The majority of eligible Aladdin workers signed union cards in 2003, although the owners at the time declined to recognize the union. After Robert Earl's group took over ownership, it reached a card-check agreement with Culinary in 2004, allowing workers to gain union representation. In 2005, the NLRB found that Aladdin Gaming had committed several unfair labor practices during the organizing campaign and ordered remedial action, including posting notices and correcting certain disciplinary records.

== Features ==
Casino floor and mezzanine level, 2007

Planet Hollywood includes approximately 68,600 sq ft (6,370 m^{2}) of casino space. As of 2025, Caesars listed the casino with approximately 890 slot machines and 80 table games. When it opened as the Aladdin, it included a 35,000 sq ft (3,300 m^{2}) "casino within a casino" by LCI, intended to attract wealthy foreign gamblers. It marked the company's first American casino. The overall casino opened with 2,800 slot machines, 1,000 of which came from the previous Aladdin. To help alleviate the resort's financial problems, the number of slot machines was reduced to 2,270 shortly after opening, making for a less-cluttered layout. Despite the financial problems, LCI's high-limit gaming area proved successful.

The resort has approximately 2,500 rooms and suites, including 2,496 redesigned guest rooms and suites completed as part of a June 2017 room renovation. It includes a 39-story hotel tower. Upon its opening, the resort included 75,000 sq ft (7,000 m^{2}) of meeting space, as well as its own on-site utility plant, providing hot and cold water, as well as backup electricity. Like the original Aladdin, the new incarnation also featured an Arabian theme, most of which was removed during the Planet Hollywood rebranding. Some elements remained in place at the separately owned Desert Passage mall after its conversion into the Miracle Mile Shops. The resort is connected to the Miracle Mile Shops, a 475,000 sq ft (44,100 m^{2}) retail, dining, and entertainment mall.

The Aladdin opened with approximately 20 restaurants, including those located in the mall. Pink's Hot Dogs opened a location at the resort in 2005. Koi, a small chain of Japanese restaurants, opened a Las Vegas location at Planet Hollywood in 2007. Koi closed in January 2024, and the space was later replaced by Caramella, an Italian restaurant and lounge developed by Caesars Entertainment and Tao Group Hospitality. Chef Gordon Ramsay opened Gordon Ramsay Burger at the resort in 2012. The restaurant includes a 30-foot-long glass wall containing flames.

A nightclub, Privé, opened at the end of 2007. It was closed in July 2009, following a year-long investigation into allegations including drug use, prostitution, the admission of minors, and assaults by employees against customers. Nevada gaming regulators issued a $500,000 fine against Planet Hollywood, which agreed to improve security and oversight at the club. It reopened in August 2009.

== Live entertainment ==
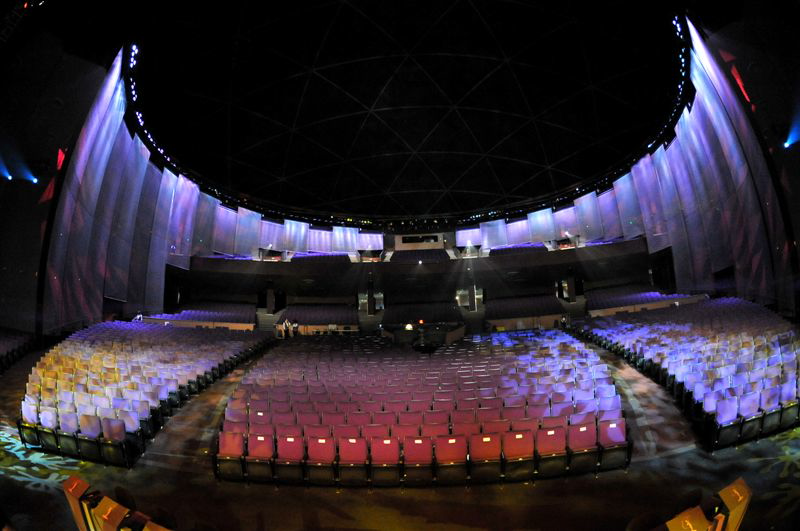
The main theater in 2009

Planet Hollywood includes PH Live, a 7,000-seat auditorium that originally opened in 1976 as part of the original Aladdin. The theater was renovated and reopened in 2000 as part of the new Aladdin, and has since operated under several names. In 2023, the venue was renamed Bakkt Theater as part of a partnership between Caesars Entertainment and Bakkt Holdings, coinciding with multimillion-dollar enhancements to the venue. By 2025, Caesars again referred to the venue as PH Live. The venue is booked in partnership with Live Nation and is surrounded by the Miracle Mile Shops.

The theater was renovated in 2005, with live entertainment planned as a major attraction for the new Planet Hollywood resort. Clear Channel Entertainment was hired to manage entertainment in the venue.

Britney Spears performed in a concert residency, Britney: Piece of Me, in the theater from 2013 to 2017. The venue has also hosted residencies and limited engagements by performers including Jennifer Lopez, Pitbull, Gwen Stefani, Lionel Richie, the Backstreet Boys, Christina Aguilera, John Legend, Shania Twain, Miranda Lambert, Keith Urban, The Chicks and Bini.

The resort also includes two smaller mezzanine-level theaters: the Criss Angel Theater and the Chippendales Theater. The Criss Angel Theater is a 1,500-seat showroom that has hosted numerous productions, including Peepshow, a topless production which ran from 2009 to 2013. Criss Angel began performing MINDFREAK there in 2018, and the show remains in production at the resort.

The Chippendales Theater was previously known as the Sin City Theater. It hosted Crazy Girls, a long-running topless show, from 2015 to 2021. In 2025, Chippendales moved into the former Sin City Theater, which was renamed Chippendales Theater. The venue is located on the mezzanine level across from the Criss Angel Theater.

== In media ==
The resort has been used as a filming location for several films. The 2008 films 21 and What Happens in Vegas used Planet Hollywood as a shooting location. The resort also appears in Knocked Up (2007), Race to Witch Mountain (2009), and Think Like a Man Too (2014).

Planet Hollywood also hosted several film premieres, including Resident Evil: Extinction (2007), Rambo (2008), 21, and the Las Vegas premiere of The Expendables (2010).

The resort has also appeared in reality television. Criss Angel Mindfreak shot footage at the resort in 2006, while Holly's World (2009–2011) chronicled television personality Holly Madison and her role in Peepshow.

== See also ==
- List of casinos in Nevada
- List of integrated resorts
