= Edwin Lowe =

Edwin Lowe may refer to:

- Edwin S. Lowe (1910–1986), American toymaker and entrepreneur, promoter of the game Bingo
- Ted Lowe (1920–2011), English snooker commentator
