= Holly's World =

American reality television series

- Genre: Reality television
- Starring: Holly Madison
- Opening theme: "Ms. Las Vegas"
- Country of origin: United States
- Original language: English
- No. of seasons: 2
- No. of episodes: 19

Production
- Executive producer: Kevin Burns
- Production location: Las Vegas, Nevada
- Camera setup: Single
- Running time: 23 minutes
- Production companies: Prometheus Entertainment; Alta Loma Entertainment; Fox Television Studios

Original release
- Network: E!
- Release: December 6, 2009 – April 3, 2011

Related
- The Girls Next Door

Holly's World is an American reality television series starring former Girls Next Door co-star Holly Madison. The series, which follows Madison's new life and career in Las Vegas, premiered December 6, 2009, on the E! cable network with a viewership of 1.879 million and ran for two seasons.

== Synopsis ==
Having left Los Angeles for the bright lights of The Las Vegas Strip, Holly Madison sets out to make her mark on the world. She stars as lead dancer in the Vegas show Peepshow at Planet Hollywood and hangs with a new group of friends, including Angel Porrino, her personal assistant/best friend, Josh Strickland, a former Broadway performer who plays the male lead in Peepshow, and Laura Croft, Holly's party ready roommate. In season 2, Claire Sinclair, Playmate of the Year 2011 and former Crazy Horse Paris burlesque performer, became the new addition to the group.

== Development ==
In July 2009, Kevin Burns revealed in an interview that he was in talks to create a show featuring Madison, with E! hoping to continue the success they had with Kendra in the summer of 2009 as it had set many records for the network, including being the highest-rated premiere since 2002. Initially a one-off special, success in the ratings led to E! ordering an eight-episode season that began airing on June 13, 2010. The show is the second spin-off to The Girls Next Door, with the first being Kendra.

In January 2010, E! announced that the ratings for the special led them to order an eight-episode season that would premiere in the summer of 2010. While The Las Vegas Sun stated in mid-2011 that a third season of the show would begin filming in September, the second season of the show became its last. The cancellation came about in July when then-new E! president Bonnie Hammer vowed to "get rid of the more Playboy trashy element" from the network - a goal that was ultimately achieved as Kendra was also canceled.

== Episodes ==
=== Series overview ===
Season	Episodes	Originally released	
Season	Episodes	First released	Last released
Pilot		December 6, 2009	
1	8	June 13, 2010	August 1, 2010
2	10	January 23, 2011	April 3, 2011

=== Pilot (2009) ===
Title	Original release date
Pilot	December 6, 2009

=== Season 1 (2010) ===
No. overall	No. in season	Title	Original release date	U.S. viewers (millions)
1	1	"Opening a Cancun of Worms"	June 13, 2010	1.897
2	2	"Better Date Than Never"	June 20, 2010	1.742
3	3	"A Housewarming Divided"	June 27, 2010	1.601
4	4	"It Takes Balls"	July 5, 2010	1.577
5	5	"Road Trippin'"	July 11, 2010	1.557
6	6	"Breast Intentions"	July 18, 2010	1.625
7	7	"Operation Angel"	July 25, 2010	1.744
8	8	"Careful What You Wish For"	August 1, 2010	2.224

=== Season 2 (2011) ===
No. overall	No. in season	Title	Original release date	U.S. viewers (millions)
9	1	"Diva Las Vegas"	January 23, 2011	2.006
10	2	"The Way We Weren't"	January 30, 2011	2.417
11	3	"On a Claire Day"	February 13, 2011	1.077
12	4	"The Trouble with Angel"	February 20, 2011	1.462
13	5	"A Hard Night's Day"	February 21, 2011	N/A
14	6	"Whatever Happened to Baby Jayde"	March 6, 2011	1.698
15	7	"A Separate Piece"	March 13, 2011	1.627
16	8	"The Parent Trip"	March 20, 2011	1.370
17	9	"Mothers and Other Strangers"	March 27, 2011	1.562
18	10	"Absinthe of Malice"	April 3, 2011	1.543

== Ratings ==
The first season premiere was viewed by 1.879 million viewers beating multiple episodes of Kendra that had recently been broadcast. The following four episodes debuted to less viewers than the week previously, but remained almost consistent with the target 18-49 demographic. This downward trend was finally reversed by the sixth episode with 1.625 million viewers watching, a 4.37% increase from the previous week. Ratings continued to improve for the rest of the season, reaching an all-time high with 2.224 million viewers watching the season finale. The season averaged 1.746 million viewers.

The second season premiere was viewed by 2.006 million viewers, once again beating multiple episodes of Kendra that had recently been broadcast. The following week saw ratings at an all-time high with 2.417 million viewers. The season averaged 1.640 million viewers. (Note: This excludes the ratings for the fifth episode due to ratings information for the episode not being released because it aired outside of its usual timeslot.)
