= Juliette Fretté =

American model (born 1983)

Playboy centerfold appearance
- June 2008
- Preceded by: AJ Alexander
- Succeeded by: Laura Croft

Personal details
- Born: December 25, 1983 (age 42) Santa Clara, California, U.S.
- Height: 5 ft 7 in (1.70 m)
- Official website

Signature
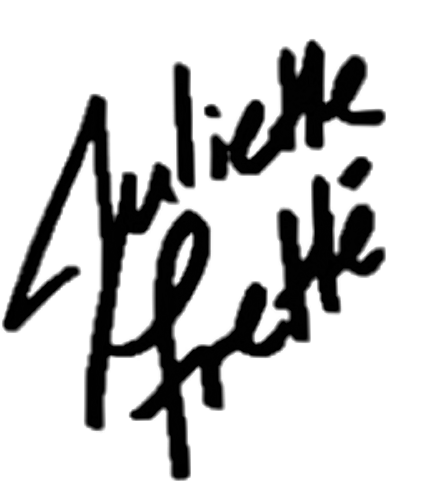

Juliette Rose Fretté (born December 25, 1983) is an American comedian, writer, artist, activist, and model. Known as "The Naughty Feminist", in 2017, she began writing for National Lampoon and Weekly Humorist, headlining with her spoof series "The Adventures of Angry Vagina".

The Playmate of the Month for the June 2008 issue of Playboy magazine, as a UCLA undergrad, Fretté first posed nude for Playboy's October 2005 issue, "Girls of the Pac-10". She was featured in the Playboy Cyber Club as a Coed of the Week (January 2006) and Coed of the Month (March 2006) under the name "Juliette Rose".

As a writer, she is featured several times in The Huffington Post, Whitehot Magazine of Contemporary Art, and Music & Lit Review. Known as Playboy's 'Feminist Playmate', she has written on a wealth of feminist topics via Examiner, beginning a 'Women's Issues' column on March 13, 2009.

Sandra Nilsson	Michelle McLaughlin	Ida Ljungqvist	Regina Deutinger	A. J. Alexander	Juliette Fretté
Laura Croft	Kayla Collins	Valerie Mason	Kelly Carrington	Grace Kim	Jennifer and Natalie Jo Campbell
