= Down the Rabbit Hole (memoir) =

Memoir by ex-Playboy Bunny Holly Madison

Down the Rabbit Hole: Curious Adventures and Cautionary Tales of a Former Playboy Bunny
- Author: Holly Madison
- Genre: Memoir; Nonfiction
- Published: June 23, 2015
- Publisher: Dey Street Books
- ISBN: 978-0062372109

Down the Rabbit Hole: Curious Adventures and Cautionary Tales of a Former Playboy Bunny is a New York Times bestselling memoir by ex-Playboy Bunny Holly Madison. Madison's debut tell-all features her early life and her infamous adventures as the former main girlfriend of Hugh Hefner and star of the television show The Girls Next Door.

Published on June 23, 2015, by Dey Street Books, this 352-page book was featured in many online and print news sources like TMZ, People magazine, Us Weekly, and Huffington Post, explained Madison's perspective of life at the Playboy Mansion.

In her memoir, Madison revealed that she hadn't planned on penning the tell-all until she realized young fans had a wrong idea about life within the mansion. The book not only caused tension between Madison and ex-boyfriend Hugh Hefner but former girlfriend Kendra Wilkinson as well. Wilkinson was so bothered by the memoir that it became spurred into an ongoing feud between herself and Madison.

Madison criticized the environment she lived in while living at the Playboy Mansion, describing it as Hefner's "twisted world" and a place where she was tempted to commit suicide.

In 2015 Madison told E! Online the possibility of a TV movie in the future.

Madison's follow-up to Down the Rabbit Hole, titled The Vegas Diaries: Romance, Rolling the Dice, and the Road to Reinvention, was published on May 17, 2016, by Dey Street Books.
