= Peepshow (burlesque) =

Show by Jerry Mitchell in Paradise, Nevada

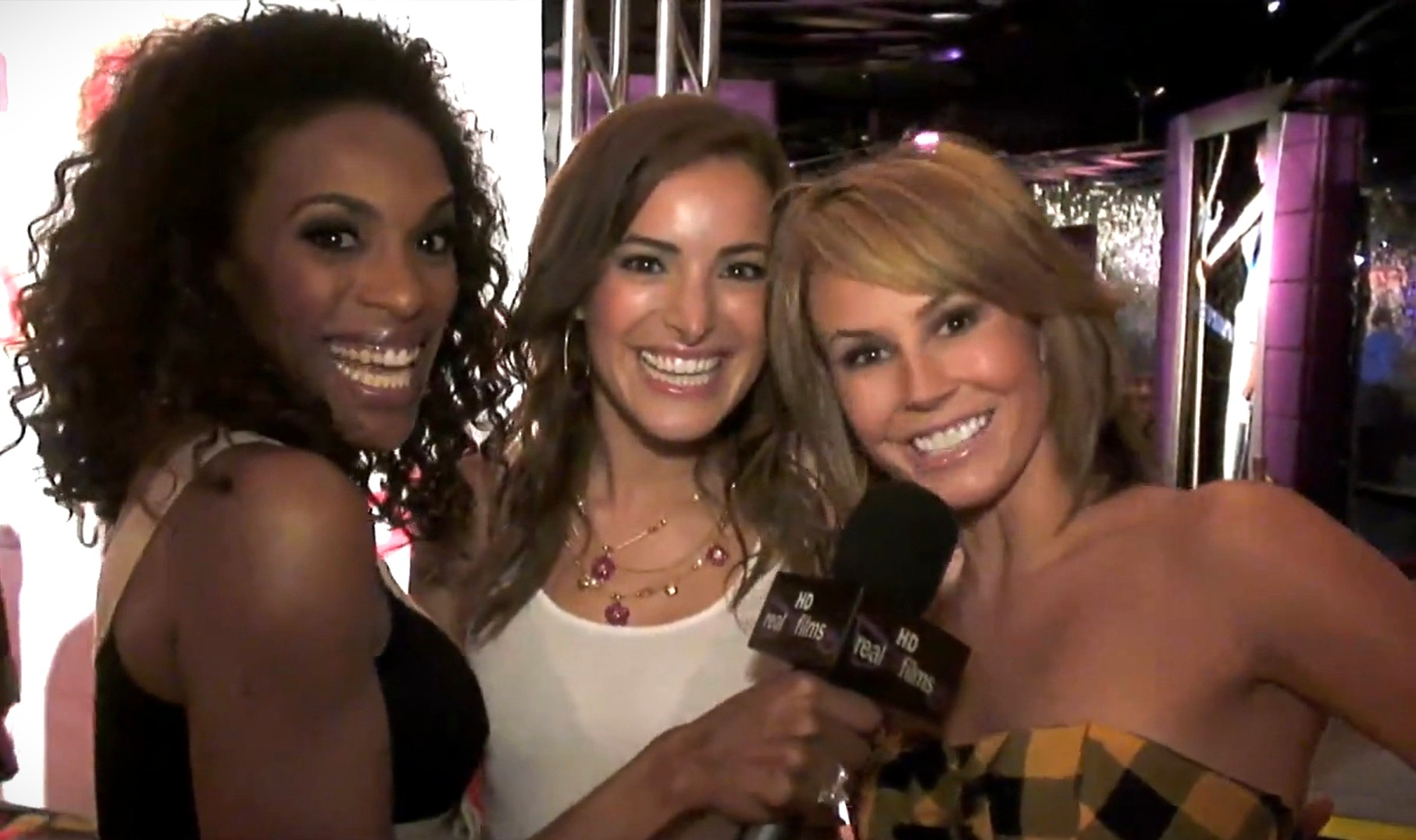
- Left to right: Cheaza Figueroa, Jackie Seiden, Keltie Colleen representing Peepshow in 2009
- Genre: Burlesque show
- Show type: Resident show
- Date of premiere: April 2009
- Final show: September 2013
- Location: Planet Hollywood Resort and Casino

Creative team
- Creator: Jerry Mitchell

Peepshow was a burlesque show created by Jerry Mitchell and the longest-running live show at Planet Hollywood Resort and Casino in Paradise, Nevada. The show ran from April 2009 to September 2013.

Celebrities who headlined the show include:

- Playboy Playmate and actress Kelly Monaco (April – June 2009)
- Singer and former Spice Girl Melanie Brown (April – June 2009)
- American Idol contestant and Broadway performer (Tarzan) Josh Strickland (April 2009 – September 2013)
- Reality TV personality Holly Madison (July 2009 – October 2012)
- Broadway singer (Wicked) Shoshana Bean (July – September 2009)
- Singer, dancer, and former member of Danity Kane Aubrey O'Day (October – December 2009)
- Singer, dancer and comedian Cheaza Figueroa (March 2010 – September 2013)
- Dancer Angel Porrino (October 2012 – December 2012)
- Model and reality television personality Coco Austin (December 2012 – September 2013)

The production premiered in April 2009, with Kelly Monaco and Melanie Brown as its initial headliners, and with a plan to replace both headliners every three months to keep the show fresh. Monaco performed the non-singing role of Bo Peep, with Brown portraying the singing Peep Diva. While the show does feature nudity, neither Monaco nor Brown appeared nude. Monaco performed in the production until her three-month contract expired in June 2009. Although it was briefly rumored that Lindsay Lohan would replace her, the role of Bo Peep ultimately went to Holly Madison. Madison started with a three-month contract, but was so popular that she was renewed for another three months, and then assumed the role on a permanent basis.

Melanie Brown portrayed the role of Peep Diva from the opening of the show until her three-month contract expired in June 2009, when she was replaced by Shoshana Bean, who also had a three-month contract. In September 2009, it was announced that Bean would be replaced by former Danity Kane member Aubrey O'Day. Both Madison and O'Day, unlike their predecessors, performed topless in the show. Blogger Perez Hilton created a brief controversy when he posted unauthorized photos of O'Day's topless performance, criticizing both O'Day's performance and her physique.

The show closed briefly from January – March 2010, while it was retooled. A new version of the production opened on March 1, 2010, with Holly Madison as the sole female celebrity lead performer as Bo Peep, along with American Idol alum Josh Strickland as the male lead (Strickland had been playing the role since the show started, but the role was expanded in retooling). The role of Peep Diva still existed in the show, but it was no longer reserved for celebrities, and was filled by singer Cheaza Figueroa (who had been the understudy in the role for all previous Peep Divas).

For one week from September 13 to 19, 2010, the role of Bo Peep was played by Angel Porrino, who gained celebrity as Madison's personal assistant on her reality TV series Holly's World. In October 2012, Madison left Peepshow because of her pregnancy, and Porrino once again stepped in as a temporary replacement (with a contract from October 22 to December 2).

On December 3, 2012, Coco Austin assumed the role of Bo Peep. She continued to play the role until the show's last performance on September 1, 2013.
