= Laura Croft =

American model (born 1983)

Playboy centerfold appearance
- July 2008
- Preceded by: Juliette Fretté
- Succeeded by: Kayla Collins

Personal details
- Born: January 30, 1983 (age 42); Jacksonville, Florida

Laura Croft (born January 30, 1983) is an American model. She was the Playmate of the Month for the July 2008 issue of Playboy magazine.

A native of Jacksonville, Florida, Croft attended Edward H. White High School, then attended Flagler College, where she majored in communication and minored in art history. Croft also appeared in the Miss Hawaiian Tropic contest in Orlando, Florida and won. She later participated in a reality show Outback Jack.

Working for Hooters, Croft appeared in several of their calendars and participated in the 2004 Miss Hooters International Pageant. Croft also appeared in a Hooters television commercial that featured Terry Bradshaw and Lee Corso. She was also a Miss BetUS calendar girl featured in April 2007. Croft sent some of her pictures to Playboy on a friend's suggestion. A week later, Playboy contacted Croft, and she posed for them. Croft appeared in the October 26, 2008, episode of E!'s The Girls Next Door when she assisted in the remodeling of the house next to the Playmate Mansion purchased by Hugh Hefner for the Playmates to live in.

On March 9, 2009, Croft appeared as WWE wrestler Randy Orton's "wife" in an angle on an episode of WWE Raw. She was a co-star in the E! series Holly's World.

Sandra Nilsson	Michelle McLaughlin	Ida Ljungqvist	Regina Deutinger	A. J. Alexander	Juliette Fretté
Laura Croft	Kayla Collins	Valerie Mason	Kelly Carrington	Grace Kim	Jennifer and Natalie Jo Campbell
