= Milton Prell =

American businessman (1905–1974)

- Born: September 6, 1905; St. Louis, Missouri, U.S.
- Died: June 2, 1974 (aged 68); Newport Beach, California, U.S.
- Occupations: hotel owner, developer
- Spouse: Devorah Zion (1945–1974, his death)
- Children: 1

Milton Gus Prell (September 6, 1905 – June 2, 1974) was an American hotel owner and developer most notable for his projects in Las Vegas, Nevada.

== Early life ==
Prell was born to a Jewish family in Saint Louis, Missouri; as a young man he moved to Los Angeles, California. He was good friends with Colonel Tom Parker, best known as the manager of Elvis Presley. Elvis married Priscilla in Prell's apartment at Las Vegas' Aladdin hotel-casino in a private wedding shielded from the media. Prell was married to Devorah Zion on July 9, 1945; they had one child, Sheila Prell (Sonenshine).

== Career ==
Prell started in the gambling business with a "bingo palace" in California. Prell ordered that the prizes were to be given honestly to the players and word got out that the place was to be trusted. The bingo palace thrived.

Prell was an automobile salesman and later a successful jewelry salesman in Los Angeles. In 1937, he moved to Butte, Montana, where he opened the 30 Club.

Prell and his family eventually relocated to Las Vegas in 1945, with plans to open a small hotel there. Prell's first project in Las Vegas was Club Bingo, opened on the Las Vegas Strip in 1947. Prell later opened the $5.5 million Sahara hotel-casino on the property in 1952. Called "The Jewel in the Desert" by Prell, the Sahara had a Moroccan theme with statues of camels standing in front of the hotel. Prell sold the Sahara to Del Webb in 1961.

In 1965, Prell bought the Aladdin hotel-casino from the Indiana-based Cook Brothers Trusts for $10.25 million on the Las Vegas Strip. The place had been failing and Prell remodeled it and added an Arabian Nights theme; it opened in 1966. Prell had added restaurants, a lounge, a 500-seat showroom and a golf course.

At the same time, Prell's brother-in-law sold his mattress business so Prell could purchase The Mint Hotel and Casino on Fremont Street. Prell promised his brother-in-law a job and made him the manager.

== Illness and death ==
Some time later, Prell suffered a stroke. Prell needed to use a wheelchair much of the time, but continued to walk with two canes through the casino to his office each morning. The Aladdin's profits were dropping and eventually he could not keep up and the Aladdin was sold. He died in Newport Beach, California on June 2, 1974, aged 69.
