= Frank Wright (historian) =

American historian

- Born: Richard Franklin Wright; June 15, 1938; Salt Lake City, Utah
- Died: April 25, 2003 (aged 64); Las Vegas, Nevada
- Known for: Las Vegas and southern Nevada historian

Richard Franklin "Frank" Wright (June 15, 1938 – April 25, 2003) was a historian in the Las Vegas, Nevada, area.

Wright was born in Salt Lake City, Utah. He received a political science degree from the University of Utah. He moved to Las Vegas in 1968 and taught at Nevada Southern University, later known as the University of Nevada, Las Vegas. In the late 1970s, he began working at the Binion's Horseshoe casino as an auditor and later as hotel manager.

In the 1980s, Wright became curator of education for the Nevada State Museum and Historical Society. Because of his knowledge of Las Vegas history, he was often consulted by film and television productions, as well as reporters and journalists. He sought to dispel common misconceptions about the city's history.

Wright was diagnosed with colon cancer in 2001, and retired from the museum in 2002. He died in Las Vegas the following year, at the age of 64. At the time of his death, he sat on the boards for numerous organizations, including the Neon Museum and the Springs Preserve. He was survived by his wife Dorothy, a stepson, four grandchildren, and a brother. Shortly after his death, the city voted to name part of a new park in his memory. Known as Frank Wright Plaza, it was located at the northwest corner of Stewart Avenue and 4th Street. It closed a few years later, after attracting a homeless population.
