= Doggy Fizzle Televizzle =

American sketch comedy television series

- Created by: Vernon Chatman; Michele Megan Dix; Jesse Ignjatovic
- Developed by: Snoop Dogg
- Directed by: Jesse Ignjatovic
- Starring: Snoop Dogg (as the host); The Snoopadelics; Don "Magic" Juan
- Country of origin: United States
- No. of episodes: 8

Production
- Executive producers: Snoop Dogg; Vernon Chatman; Tom Calderone
- Running time: approx. 30 minutes (per episode)
- Production company: MTV Networks

Original release
- Network: MTV
- Release: November 25, 2002 – August 3, 2003

Doggy Fizzle Televizzle is a sketch comedy television series created by Vernon Chatman, Michele Megan Dix and Jesse Ignjatovic for MTV. It was produced by and starred rapper Snoop Dogg. It aired from November 25, 2002 to August 3, 2003.

Snoop Dogg stated that according to the contract, the show was to air six times, but was later extended to eight episodes. The second season was canceled due to payment negotiation issues, since Snoop Dogg asked for $1 million for his role, which MTV refused to pay him.

In the beginning of every show Snoop is seen sitting bored in a leather armchair in an empty room while switching channels from Jerry Springer to a cart race then to black and white burlesque figure skating after that to a strip show and finally to a Richard Marx music video when he decides to change the situation and the idea of Doggy Fizzle Televizzle comes to his mind. This ends the intro and the main theme follows with Snoop rapping.

== Episodes ==
Here are the episodes with the list of segments long enough to be notable.

=== Pilot - The Race Card ===
Airdate: November 25, 2002

Intro: MTV News about Snoop is challenging Lance Bass to a space race, when gets kidnapped by UFOs.
Special guest appearances by Samuel L. Jackson, Colin Farrell, Killer Mike, Big Boi, Bootsy Collins, George Clinton

- Snoop reveals the blurred parts in his videos censored by MTV.
- Undercover Snoop works at the Arby's R & B car drive-through fast food restaurant as a window receptionist.
- Snoop answers the fans' questions.

Quotes:

1. Q1:Snoop, are you involved in any charities?
  - Snoop:Man of course, you know me, I'm involved in a very important charity all the time. You know, once a year I treat two ladies to a ten seconds shopping spree at a 99-cent store. Check this out! (illustrative shortfilm)
2. Q2:Snoop, what do you think about police brutality?
  - Snoop:Police brutality isn't too horrible. I think the way police are treated is disgusting, sick. Man, if you have ever seen the latest incident that happened in Inglewood. Rodney King tape looked like a pillow fight, it wasn't that serious.(illustrative shortfilm where neighborhood people even kids are beating a police officer).
3. Q3:Snoop, I know you're not a judge. But do you think R. Kelly is guilty?
  - Snoop:Man, you can trust what you can see on that tape. There's even a tape going around where people saying it's me. I swear it's not me on that tape for real. Besides she said she was 18. Judge for yourself. (illustrative shortfilm with a Snoop look-alike having sex with a grandma).
- Snoop teaches in a kindergarten wearing a disguise.
- Advertisement for From Da Palace to tha Pre-school CD, a children's edition album.
- MTV's Becoming : Snoop Dogg (parody).
- Adventures of Cap'n Pimp, that is Captain Pimp, one of the recurring comedy characters of Snoop.
- Snoop joins the training of the Oakland Raiders
  - Special guest appearances by Sebastian Janikowski, Jerry Rice, Lincoln Kennedy, coach Willie Brown.
- Outro song: "From tha Chuuch to da Palace" (live acoustic).
  - performed by Snoop Dogg and the Snoopadelics.

=== Episode 1 - Snoop Goes to a Strip Joint ===
Airdate: June 22, 2003

- Snoop visits a twilight home and takes the elder people to a one-day off tour to spend the day with him in Snoop style.
- Snoop Dogg introduces the Race card which allows black people to exclaim against possible discrimination (real or hysterical) by simply showing up a credit card sized black piece of paper with a white fist on it.
- Parody of MTV's Crib Crashers with Snoop changing an Asian student's room into a jail cell.
- Snoop answers the fans' questions.
- Snoop presents the W-I-G-O-U-T force, a team devoted to convert white rap culture worshippers (see Wigga) into everyday middle-class bourgeoisie.
- MTV News by Swayne Dizzle, a parody of Sway Calloway done by Snoop.
- Snoop gives away his One millionth loan.
- A short movie called The Negrotiator (a parody inspired by the motion picture The Negotiator)
- Outro song: "Pimp Slapp'd" (live acoustic)
  - performed by Snoop Dogg and the Snoopadelics.

=== Episode 2 - Snoop Teaches English ===
Airdate: June 29, 2003

- Snoop teaches proper English in a night school for foreigners.
- Advertisement for Hate-a-Rade, an energy drink for haters.
- Parody of MTV's Diary, this time is of pimp Big Jeffrey played by Snoop.
- The Braided Brunch, a parody of the family sitcom The Brady Bunch.
  - Starring Bobb'e J. Thompson
  - Theme song by Nate Dogg.
- Snoop answers the fans' questions.

Quotes:

1. Q1:Hey Snoop, are you recognized wherever you go?
  - Snoop:Oh yeah, that's why I have to wear disguise whenever I go out in public so I won't be bothered. Check it! (illustrative short film showing Snoop in the street in a crocodile costume).
2. Q2:Hey Snoop! You're good with the ladies what can I do to keep my girl happy?
  - Snoop:It's real simple. All you gotta do is get her some nice every day. Like look at what I do (short movie with Snoop robbing a shop to get money for himself, candy and roses for his girls)
3. Q3:Have you ever done any volunteer work?
  - Snoop:Actually I have. I recently joined this big brother program to show a kid what it's like to have a big brother.(illustration)
4. Q4:I know you are not doing drugs any more. But I do wanna know what made you decide to quit?
  - Snoop:After what happened to me, I never even think about doing drugs.(the clip shows Snoop smoking weed and talking to a dollar)
- Snoop presents his 12-step program for those who want to put down drugs.
  - Special guest appearance by Redman and Ludacris.
- Advertisement for the Wake N' Bake Oven, a plastic toy for kids that bakes weed cookies.
- MTV News with Swayne Dizzle.
- Two seconds long freestyle battle between two MCs in the Doggy Fizzle studio.
- Snoop works as an ice cream man in the suburbs.
- Black History Moment with Snoop.
- Outro song: Lodi Dodi (live acoustic)
  - performed by Snoop Dogg and the Snoopadelics.

=== Episode 3 - Snoop Visits the Mansion ===
Airdate: July 6, 2003

Intro: Snoop reads a bedtime story from Big black Booty tales-book.

- Snoop enters the studio and presents the "National Pimp Appreciation Day" celebration parade in downtown Detroit and Los Angeles.
  - special guest appearance by Carmen Electra
- Snoop Dogg visits the Playboy Mansion.
  - special guest appearance by Hugh Hefner
  - special guest appearance by Pacman Jones
  - special guest appearance by Lil Bow Wow
- Next episode of The Braided Bunch.
- Big Jeffrey gives the viewers tips for how to get a girl.
- Snoop answers the fans' questions.
- Snoop protests against the wearing of fur coats, especially if they were stolen from rich white people previously.
- MTV News with Swayne Dizzle.
- Adventures of Cap'n Pimp.
- Black History Moment with Snoop.
- Outro song: Frank Sinatra's "New York, New York"

=== Episode 4 - Snoopermarket ===
Airdate: July 13, 2003

Snoop Dogg opens up the episode with a guest appearance by pro wrestler Triple H and him wrestling.

Snoop Dogg rehashes his life and choices through a series of humorous videos.

Snoop Dogg gives the audience Snoop Dogg bobbleheads.

- Special guest appearances by Master P, Alan Spotts, and Cris Bourgnine

=== Episode 5 - Blackass ===
Airdate: July 20, 2003

- Snoop participates in Blackass, featuring Steve-O and Wee-Man

=== Episode 6 - Snoop Hangs with S.W.A.T. ===
Airdate: July 27, 2003

- Special guest appearances by Fred Berry, Samuel L. Jackson, Colin Farrell, and Jillian Barberie

=== Episode 7 - Best of ===
Airdate: August 3, 2003

New sketches:

- Snoop Dogg hosts from the backstage of The Rock the Mic tour
  - Special guest appearances by Soopafly, 50 Cent, Lloyd Banks, Young Buck, DJ Whoo Kid.
- Snoop hangs out with white kids
  - Special guest appearance by Steve-O
- Snoop advertises his new foundation and charity hot-line 1-888-SAVE-RAPP
  - Archive footage of Ice-T, Coolio, MC Hammer, Heavy D, 3rd Bass.
- Outro song: "(I've Had) The Time of My Life"
  - Performed by Bill Medley & Jennifer Warnes
