= Edwin S. Lowe =

American salesman, toymaker & game entrepreneur (1910–1986)

- Born: 1910; Poland
- Died: February 23, 1986 (age 75); Manhattan, New York, United States
- Occupations: salesman, toymaker, gaming entrepreneur, real estate developer, film and theatrical producer
- Known for: Popularization of Bingo
- Spouse: Barbara Lowe
- Children: 1

Edwin S. Lowe (1910 – February 23, 1986) was a American salesman, toymaker, game entrepreneur and real estate developer whose promotion of a game he renamed Bingo made it popular as a national pastime and fundraising activity for churches and schools. His company the E. S. Lowe Company produced bingo games and materials in addition to plastic toys and the dice game Yahtzee. He later worked in film and stage production, including the Broadway 1981 play A Talent for Murder, featuring Claudette Colbert. Lowe also opened the Tallyho hotel on the Las Vegas Strip in 1962.

== Biography ==
Lowe was born in Poland, the eldest son of an Orthodox rabbi, and studied in the British Mandate of Palestine before relocating to the United States at the age of eighteen. While working as a traveling toy salesman in December 1929, Lowe encountered a group at an Atlanta, Georgia carnival engaged in a game called Beano. Returning to his Brooklyn, NY, home, he organized a game with several friends, one of whom became so excited at winning, she shouted "Bingo!" The popularity of the game among his acquaintances prompted Lowe to print game cards, which he later sold under the name Bingo. He established the E. S. Lowe Company for the production of his Bingo game cards, which initially were released as 24-card sets. The company later increased the number of variations to more than 6,000 card combinations, adding to the game's popularity.

E. S. Lowe produced miniature chess and checker game sets that circulated widely among U.S. service personnel in World War II. The company continued to produce games and plastic toys after the war, including a boxed toy casino set called Monte Carlowe. In 1956, he bought rights from a Canadian couple who approached him with a concept of a game that they played on their yacht. Lowe highlighted its origins in naming the game – Yahtzee. In 1959, Lowe produced the popular "Renaissance Chess Set" which featured highly detailed chessmen based on the Renaissance period. The beautiful design of these chess pieces has made them a favorite with chess players and collectors. Milton Bradley Company purchased E. S. Lowe Company in 1973 for $26 million.

In 1962, Lowe opened the 450-room Tallyho hotel on the Las Vegas Strip. It was the only major hotel in Nevada without a casino, as Lowe believed that there were some tourists to the city who were not interested in gambling. Because of low revenue caused by the lack of a casino, the hotel closed later that year, with Lowe stating that it was a mistake to open without a casino.

== Personal life ==
His last wife was Barbara (Zolnerowich) Lowe. He had one daughter Gail Ann Lowe Haymes Maidman with Jeanette Marmott Lowe, Gail. He maintained a home at Quogue, Long Island, New York, but died at his Manhattan residence on February 23, 1986, at the age of 75.
