= Essi Moh =

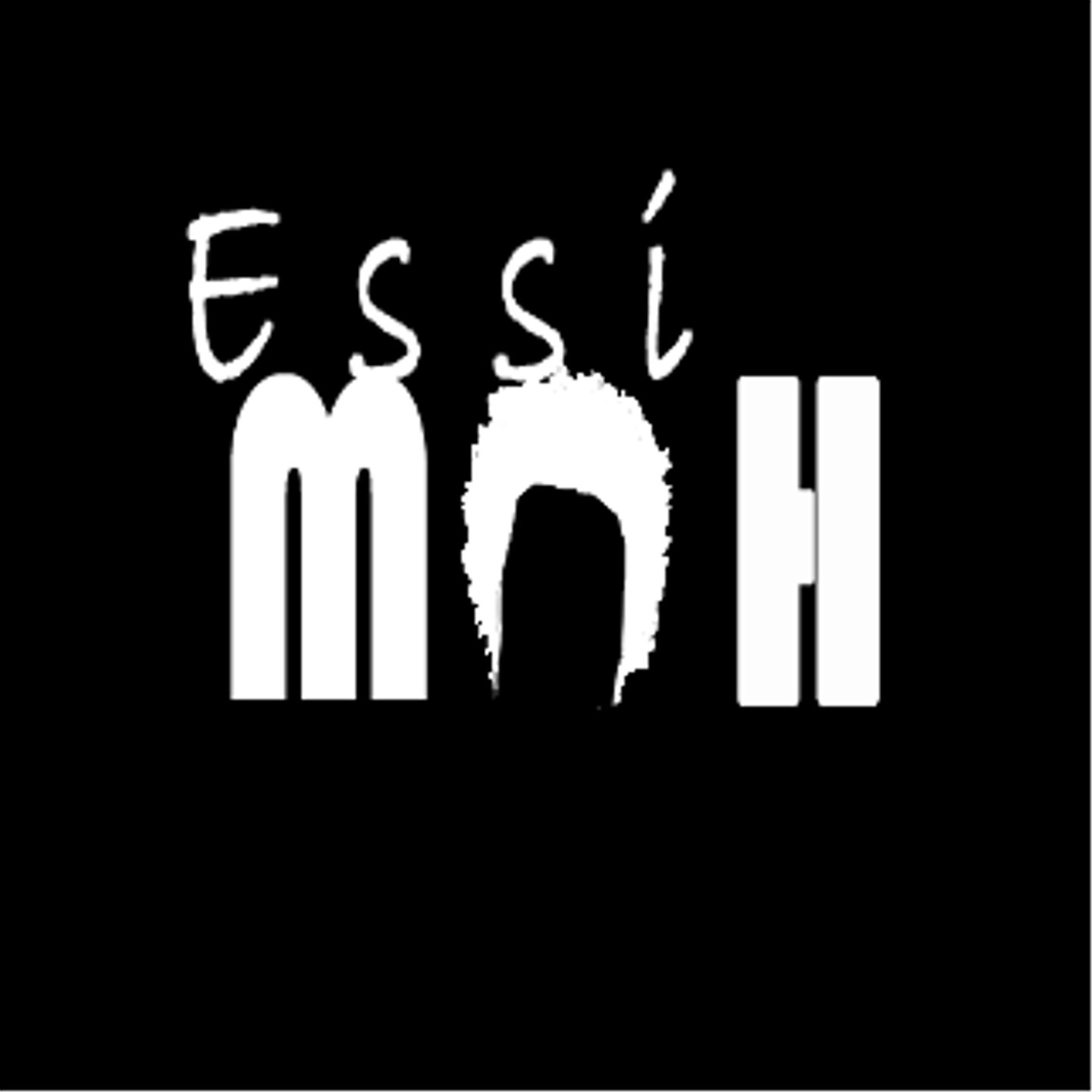

Background information
- Genres: Ethnic Blues
- Label: Roubla Productions
- Website: www.essimoh.com

Essi Moh is a singer, actor, songwriter and guitar player.

Moh's name refers to the Algerian saying "Dar Essi moh, edkhoul ou rouh", which means : "Essi Moh’s place, you can enter it and leave it whenever you want!". Moh started his career as a guitarist playing reggae, soul music, chanson française, blues, and gnawi.

In 2010, Moh and songwriter Karim Kiared recorded EP Zenjabil. Its success encouraged Moh to produce his first full album. Zenjabil v2.0 in 2011.

Moh acted in the movie Les zanamours transitoires by Lazh Lo and also wrote and produced the music.

== Discography ==
- 2010: Khatini
- 2011: Zenjabile v2.0
