= MrBeast Burger =

American virtual restaurant chain

- Type: Joint venture
- Industry: Fast food
- Founded: November 10, 2020; 6 years ago in Wilson, North Carolina
- Founder: Jimmy Donaldson
- Number of locations: 2,000 virtual restaurants; 1 physical restaurant; (2023)
- Areas served: Australia; Bahrain; Brazil; Canada; Colombia; Germany; Ireland; Kuwait; Lithuania; Mexico; New Zealand; Peru; Philippines; Slovenia; Sweden; Switzerland; Saudi Arabia; United Arab Emirates; United Kingdom; United States
- Products: Burgers; Sandwiches; Fries; Drinks
- Website: mrbeastburger.com

MrBeast Burger is an American virtual restaurant founded and developed by Internet personality MrBeast, in partnership with Virtual Dining Concepts, LLC. There are over 2,000 virtual locations internationally, including 600 in the United States, with plans to expand to more countries and increase the number of locations significantly.

The chain features a menu consisting of various burgers, french fries, desserts, and canned beverages. Customers order food from a delivery app, which in turn is prepared at the brick-and-mortar locations of contracted restaurants.

== History ==
=== Pre-release ===
Although it is unclear when Donaldson began working on MrBeast Burger, he said on his Twitter account that he had been planning on the release "for forever". Will Hyde, a manager for Donaldson's YouTube channel, said that the project had been in the works for several months, while Reed Duchscher, another manager, stated that it had been planned for over a year. The official Twitter account for MrBeast Burger was created on August 12, 2020, and locations began appearing to users on delivery apps days before the official release.

=== Official opening ===
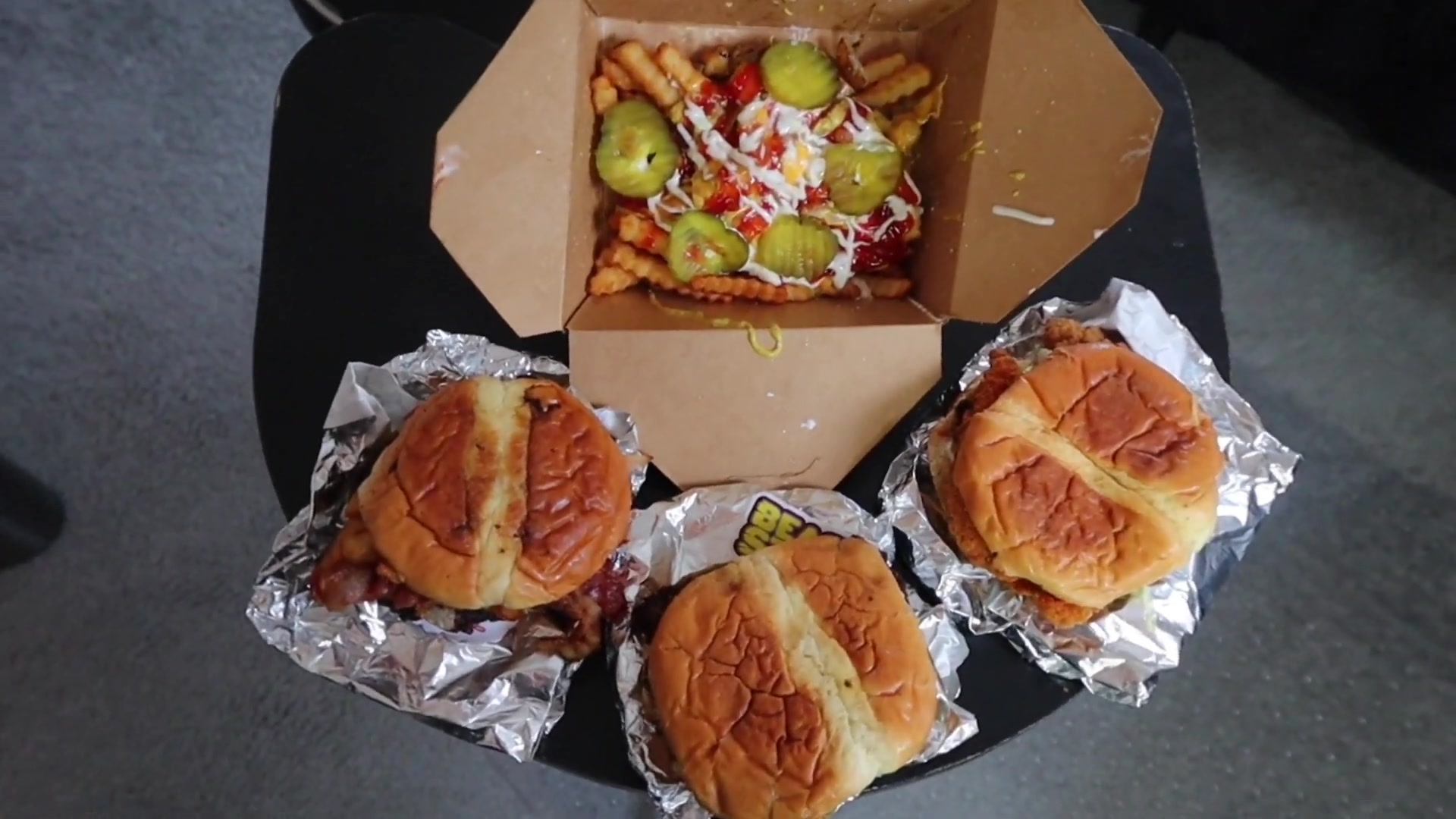
Clockwise from top: Beast Style Fries, Nashville Hot Chicken Tender Sandwich, Beast Style Burger, Chris Style Burger

The first MrBeast Burger location officially opened on November 10, 2020, in Wilson, North Carolina. This location, which was a temporarily redecorated Burger Boy restaurant, was one of the only physical locations of the restaurant. As part of a YouTube video, Donaldson advertised free food and gave away money, technology, and even a new car to patrons who lined up in the building's drive-through. The event attracted thousands of customers, with the line reaching as far as 20 miles (32 km) at times.

Although police worked to control traffic, the line eventually became too long to handle and, at the request of the police department, the line was closed. Donaldson uploaded a video of this event to his YouTube channel on December 19, 2020, where he officially announced the chain's opening with pop-up and contracted 300 locations across the United States. Donaldson also announced that a portion of each order would be donated to charities helping to ensure food security worldwide.

MrBeast Burger rapidly rose to popularity after it was announced. Shortly after the video was uploaded, it reached the #1 trending spot on YouTube, and the corresponding MrBeast Burger apps rose to the top spot on the Apple App Store and Google Play Store. The apps were downloaded at such a rate that servers became overwhelmed, causing temporary service outages for some users. The issue was fixed shortly thereafter. Due to its surge in popularity, almost all of the pop-up and contracted 300 locations reported running out of food on the first night.

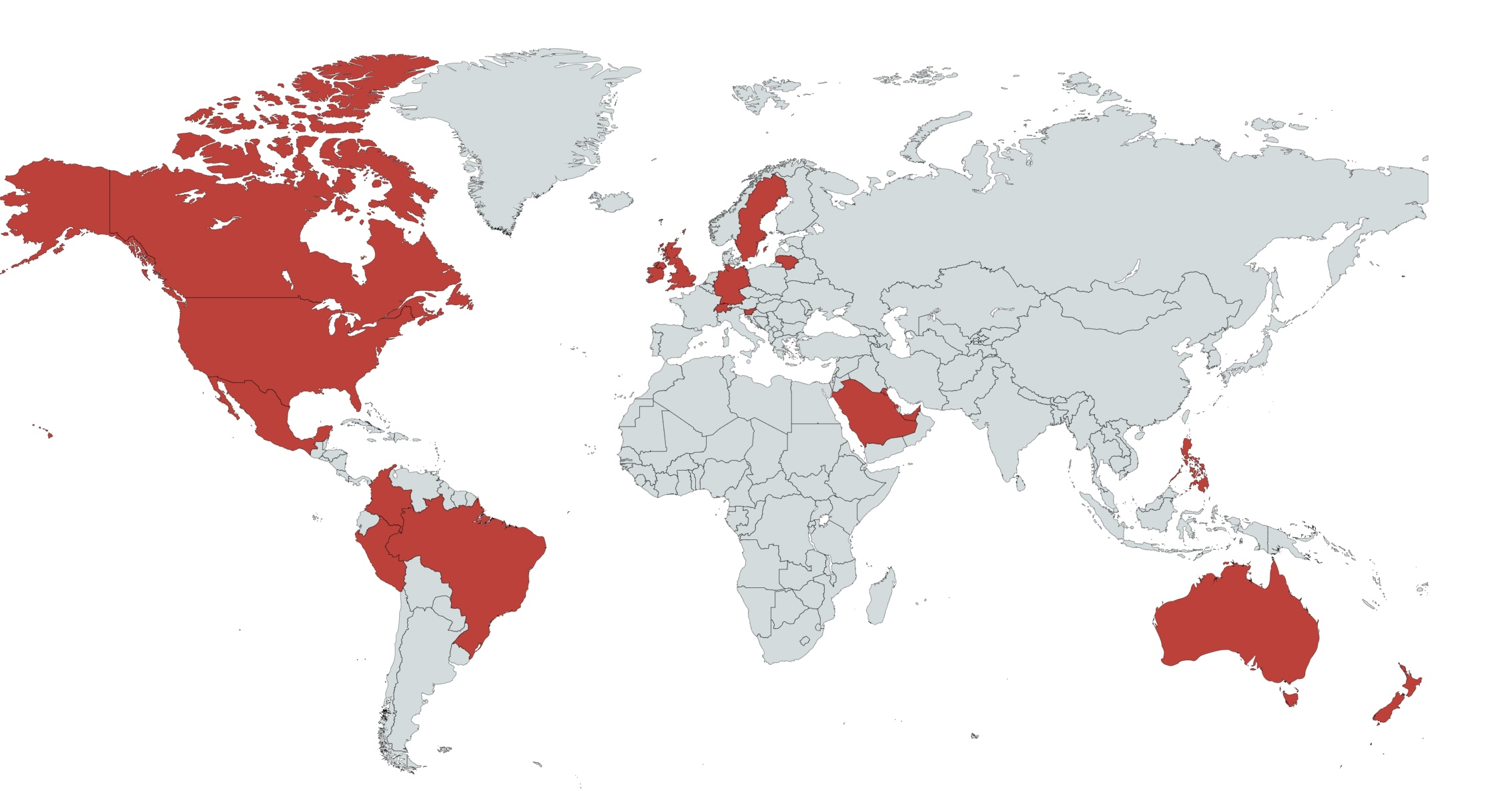
Map of countries where MrBeast Burger is available

Four months after its opening, MrBeast Burger passed one million burgers sold.

On April 26, 2021, MrBeast Burger announced a partnership with YouTuber Dream involving the introduction of a new limited-time Dream Burger featuring two smashed beef patties, American cheese, lettuce, mayo, bacon, two pickles, and smashed avocado.

On October 7, 2021, Christopher Hedgecock filed a class action complaint against Virtual Dining Concepts. Hedgecock claimed to have been overcharged by $3.16 on a Beast Style Burger Combo, despite Oregon law prohibiting the charge of sales tax on fast food.

On March 18, 2022, Donaldson uploaded a video on his MrBeast 2 channel, titled "I Made 100 People Try This!". It featured the release of the newest item on the MrBeast Burger menu, the Shrek Quesadilla. Universal Studios had allowed him to license the Shrek IP. The quesadilla consists of two beef patties, cheese, pickles, and onions.

=== Expansion ===
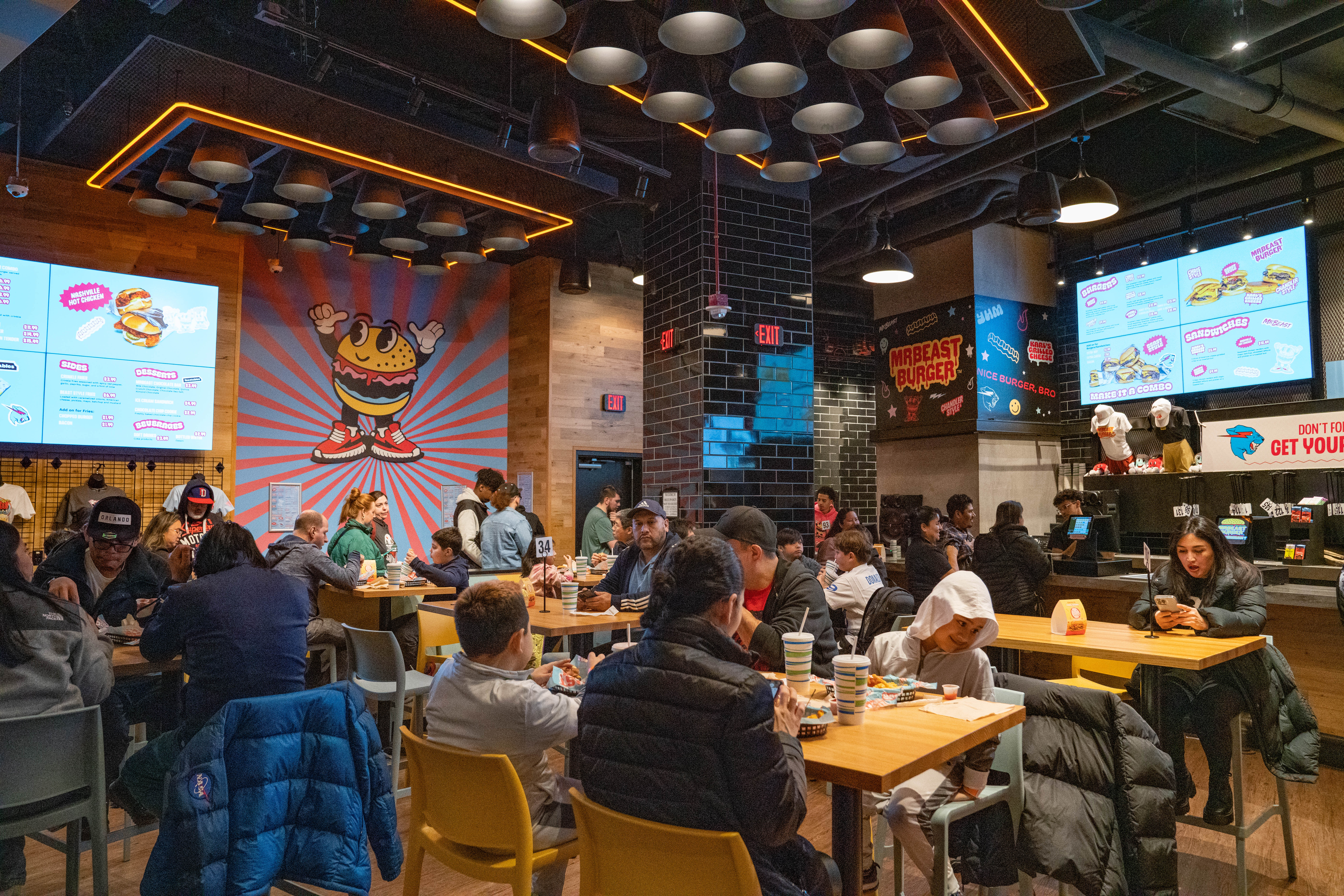
The American Dream Mall holds the first MrBeast Burger restaurant in the United States.

Since its initial opening, plans for the expansion of MrBeast Burger locations have been announced. Following complaints from fans who did not live in areas served by delivery, Donaldson acknowledged the issue and stated that efforts were underway to double and triple the number of locations.

The first locations in Canada were opened in early February in Toronto, Edmonton and Calgary, with additional locations opening shortly after in Vancouver, Halifax and Winnipeg. The first locations in the United Kingdom opened in early May, with five locations.

On August 30, 2022, Donaldson announced that he would bring a MrBeast Burger shop to the American Dream Mall in East Rutherford, New Jersey, near New York City, to be the location of his first U.S. restaurant. The restaurant then proceeded to open on September 4, 2022, where thousands of patrons flooded the mall so much so that New Jersey state troopers were called in to control the crowd situation.

It also opened its first Southeast Asian virtual location in the Philippines in partnership with JustKitchen Philippines and GrabFood on March 22, 2023.

MrBeast Burger has over 300 virtual locations across the US mainland, and a location in Puerto Rico. In 2023, the business came to Mexico. In 2024, the chain debuted in Brazil. Since 2023, the chain serves in Colombia.

In 2025, the franchise launched in Germany. In July, the chain also announced plans to launch in New Zealand.

== Reception ==
=== Quality concerns ===
Upon opening, MrBeast Burger received mixed reviews. Many customers shared their opinions on Twitter, with some praising the chain while others complained of poor service and long waiting times. Additionally, accusations surfaced that chains were serving uncooked food.

Although many customers tried to contact Donaldson to express their complaints directly, others came to Donaldson's defense and redirected the blame to the restaurants preparing the orders. Because the chain is operated as a ghost kitchen, the orders are cooked by staff of the contracted restaurant, hence the quality of an order can be dependent on the location it was ordered from. Donaldson addressed the complaints on Twitter, stating, "I'll be the first to admit we are not perfect!...[S]ome people had problems and I will gladly refund them and do what I have to to make it right!"

=== Benefit to struggling restaurants ===
MrBeast Burger became a second source of revenue for struggling restaurants during the COVID-19 pandemic. The chain featured a menu that easily suits many restaurant kitchens without the need for new equipment or training. One location outside Dallas reported earning over $7,000 on their first day open. Most of the restaurants that Beast Burger operates from are Buca di Beppos, Bertucci's, and Bravo! Italian Kitchens, but other restaurants can also apply to become a MrBeast Burger location.

== Lawsuit ==
On June 17, 2023, after a fan tweeted a query on the deletion of the MrBeast Burger announcement video, Donaldson replied, stating that he is "moving on from MrBeast Burger" to "focus on Feastables and making snacks". He said he regrets signing "a bad deal" with Virtual Dining Concepts, LLC, but said the company "won't let me stop even though it's terrible for my brand". Donaldson's replies were deleted soon after.

On July 31, 2023, Donaldson filed a lawsuit against Virtual Dining Concepts for breach of contract. Donaldson's complaint stated his belief that the company behind his chain has failed to uphold the quality he so desired, alleging that it was more focused on its own growth than the quality of the venture's product. The filing also stated that Virtual Dining Concepts trademarked MrBeast without the knowledge of Donaldson, and because of such, Donaldson has not received any compensation from MrBeast Burger.

Virtual Dining's lawyers quickly dismissed the complaints and alleged that Donaldson's allegations are "riddled with false statements and inaccuracies", noting that Donaldson recently attempted to negotiate a new contract with Virtual Dining. The firm, represented by Greenberg Traurig, further claims that Donaldson used "bullying tactics" to escape from his existing contractual obligations without sensible reasoning. Virtual Dining "had hoped Mr. Donaldson would act honorably", but said he had "elevated greed over his word and the truth", and that he "will face the consequences in court when Virtual Dining files it [sic] claims against him". The case will be heard in the United States District Court for the Southern District of New York, with no judge assigned as of yet.

Virtual Dining Concepts later counter-sued, alleging that Donaldson "walked away from a promising deal" and failed to meet various contractual obligations, including promotional appearances for the brand. In 2026, more leaked messages showed that Donaldson was resentful of the brand.

== See also ==
- List of hamburger restaurants
- Lunchly
- Pink Sauce
