= Robert Earl =

English-American businessman (born 1951)

- Born: Robert Ian Leigh; 29 May 1951 (age 75); Hendon, Middlesex, England
- Citizenship: United Kingdom; United States
- Occupations: Film producer, investor, restaurateur, and television personality
- Title: Owner, founder and CEO, Planet Hollywood; Host, Robert Earl's Be My Guest television program; Chairman, Planet Hollywood Resort & Casino Las Vegas; Chairman, Buca di Beppo Italian Restaurants; Founder and chairman, Earl of Sandwich Restaurants
- Spouse: Tricia Earl
- Children: Beth, Cara, Robbie
- Father: Robert Earl

Robert Earl (born 29 May 1951) is an English-American film producer, investor, restaurateur, and television personality. He is the founder and CEO of Planet Hollywood, chairman of the Planet Hollywood Resort & Casino in Las Vegas, and host of Robert Earl's Be My Guest television program which airs weekly on the Cooking Channel.

== Early life ==
Robert Earl was born Robert Ian Leigh, son of British entertainer Robert Earl. Earl grew up in Hendon and was educated at the local school, but also travelled around a great deal in the UK, Europe and the United States, following his father's career.

Earl graduated from the University of Surrey with an honours degree in Hotel and Catering Management. In 2012, he set up the Robert Earl Scholarship, awarded each year to 14 students across the School of Hospitality and Tourism Management, worth up to £2,500 each.

== Business career and investments ==
Earl was named one of "The 25 Most Influential Americans" by Time in 2001.

=== President Entertainment ===
Earl began his career with his first Beefeater medieval theatre-themed restaurant in 1972. With its success, Earl opened additional themed restaurants, The Cockney Club, Shakespeare's Tavern, and Talk of London, in the late 1970s. Seeing the US market as having more growth potential, he attempted to sell the concepts to developers working on Disney's EPCOT, but the deal fell through. He stayed to open several theme restaurants with medieval and Wild West concepts in the Orlando market. Amongst those themed restaurants in central Florida were Caruso's Palace (now Race Rock), King Henry's Feast, and the original Shakespeare's Tavern on Church Street.

Earl enlarged the business to include 70 restaurants by the time he merged his company President Entertainment with Pleasurama PLC, a London-based leisure group, in 1987. The transaction yielded Earl $63 million.

=== Pleasurama PLC and Hard Rock Cafe ===
Joining the board, he was tasked with undertaking the purchase of Hard Rock Cafe. After becoming the brand's CEO, Earl enlarged it from 7 to 22 units in 5 years, resulting in the eventual sale of the brand to Rank Group. Earl was also a director of Pelican Group PLC, which owns the Café Rouge, Dôme, and Mamma Amalfi brands, leaving the company after its sale to Whitbread PLC.

=== Planet Hollywood ===
==== Planet Hollywood Restaurants ====
In 1991, Earl founded Planet Hollywood, negotiating celebrity investments from Arnold Schwarzenegger and Bruce Willis, and partnerships including Demi Moore, and Sylvester Stallone. The company has filed for Chapter 11 bankruptcy twice, but Earl still owns a large amount of stock with original investors Stallone and Willis, alongside new Asian investors.

==== Planet Hollywood Hotels ====
In June 2003, in partnership with Bay Harbour Management LC and Starwood, Earl purchased the Aladdin Resort and Casino on the Las Vegas Strip. In 2007 it was relaunched as the Planet Hollywood Resort & Casino. In 2010, Earl sold the property to Caesars Entertainment, but retained the brand's license.

=== Earl of Sandwich ===
In 2004, Robert Earl, Lord John Montagu, and Orlando Montagu founded Earl of Sandwich, a series of sandwich shops, and opened the first location at Downtown Disney. Earl of Sandwich has since become a franchise, with 36 locations, with Earl serving as the chairman.

=== Everton Football Club ===
In October 2006, Earl became a 23% owner and director of English Premier League club Everton, buying the shareholding of Paul and Anita Gregg via his BCR Sports investment vehicle registered in the British Virgin Islands.

In March 2016, Earl sold his stake in Everton Football Club to Farhad Moshiri at a reported £175 million valuation.

=== Buca di Beppo Italian Restaurants ===
In 2008, he acquired the casual dining company Buca di Beppo and its chain of 88 restaurants, which serve family-style Italian-American food. He has since expanded the chain into new locations in the US and internationally.

=== Bertucci's Brick Oven Pizzeria Restaurants ===
In 2018, he acquired the Bertucci's Company and its 59 locations, predominantly located in New England and the northeastern United States.

=== Chicken Guy! ===
In 2018, Earl and Guy Fieri collaborated to open a fried chicken fast-food chain called Chicken Guy! The first location opened at Disney Springs in Orlando, Florida. Additional locations have opened at FedEx Field, Levi's Stadium, the Aventura Mall in Aventura, Florida, and 200 American Canyon Rd in American Canyon, California.

=== Bravo! Italian Kitchen and Brio Italian Grille ===
In June 2020, Earl, through Earl Enterprises, acquired the Bravo! Italian Kitchen and Brio Italian Grille restaurant chains for $30 million after they went bankrupt in April. The acquisition included 45 of their locations across 19 U.S. states and the rehiring of over 4,000 previous employees.

=== Virtual Dining Concepts ===
In 2018, Earl launched Virtual Dining Concepts, a company centered around starting virtual kitchen businesses that are delivery only. Some concepts created include Wing Squad, as well as various celebrity collaborations, such as Tyga Bites (with rapper Tyga) and MrBeast Burger.

== Entertainment media ==
=== Television series ===
==== Robert Earl's Be My Guest ====
As host of Robert Earl's Be My Guest, Earl travels the world exploring popular restaurants and dishes out his knowledge from decades in the dining industry. The series premiered in September 2014 and airs weekly on the Cooking Channel. The show's success was celebrated with a primetime marathon in February 2015.

==== Food Fortunes ====
On the Food Fortunes television programme, food visionaries pitch their products to a rotating panel of investors, who are some of the biggest names in the food, online and retail industry. Earl was a recurring castmember during Season 1, as a member of the panel of investors. The series, which premiered on 9 March 2015, airs weekly on the Food Network.

==== On The Menu ====
In 2014, Earl was a guest judge on two episodes of the television series On the Menu, which was produced by Mark Burnett and aired on TNT television network. Two episodes centred around restaurant chains owned by Earl, for which he served on the panel of judges deciding the winner. In Season 1, Episode 4, the final challenge was creating a dessert for Earl's Planet Hollywood restaurants. In Season 1, Episode 9, the final challenge was creating a pasta dish for Earl's Buca di Beppo restaurants.

== Personal life ==
Earl and his wife Tricia have three children: Beth, Cara, and Robbie. They reside in Orlando, Florida.
