= Virtual Dining Concepts =

American virtual restaurant company

Virtual Dining Concepts, LLC
- Type: Private
- Industry: Virtual restaurants
- Founded: 2020; 6 years ago
- Founder: Robert Earl; Robbie Earl; Trish Giordano
- Headquarters: Orlando, Florida, United States
- Key people: Robert Earl (president)
- Website: joinvdc.com

Virtual Dining Concepts, LLC (VDC) is an American company specializing in virtual restaurants. It was founded in 2020 and has produced independent concepts and celebrity collaborations. In 2023, VDC was sued by American YouTuber MrBeast, alleging a breach of contract and failing to uphold the quality of the virtual restaurant MrBeast Burger. VDC denied MrBeast's allegations and counter-sued against him.

== History ==
VDC was co-founded by English-American businessman and Planet Hollywood founder Robert Earl, his son Robbie, and Trish Giordano in 2020. Its first CEO and current president was Robert Earl. In 2022, he was replaced as CEO with former DoorDash enterprise partnerships lead Stephanie Sollers, who stepped down as a board executive in January 2024. Their headquarters are in Orlando, Florida, United States.

== Products ==
VDC has produced concepts such as Wing Squad, P.Za Kitchen, Midtown Salads, and City Burger Co. as well as celebrity collaborations such as FaZe Subs, MrBeast Burger, Pauly D's Italian Subs, Tyga Bites, and NASCAR Refuel.

== MrBeast Burger lawsuit ==
On July 31, 2023, MrBeast (Jimmy Donaldson) filed a lawsuit against Virtual Dining Concepts for breach of contract. Donaldson's complaint stated his belief that the company behind his chain has failed to uphold the quality he so desired, alleging that it was more focused on its own growth than the quality of the venture's product. The filing also stated that Virtual Dining Concepts trademarked MrBeast without the knowledge of Donaldson, and because of such, Donaldson has not received any compensation from MrBeast Burger.

Virtual Dining's lawyers quickly dismissed the complaints and alleged that Donaldson's allegations are "riddled with false statements and inaccuracies", noting that Donaldson recently attempted to negotiate a new contract with Virtual Dining. The firm, represented by Greenberg Traurig, further claims that Donaldson used "bullying tactics" to escape from his existing contractual obligations without sensible reasoning. Virtual Dining "had hoped Mr. Donaldson would act honorably", but said he had "elevated greed over his word and the truth", and that he "will face the consequences in court when Virtual Dining files it [sic] claims against him". The case will be heard in the United States District Court for the Southern District of New York, with no judge assigned as of yet.
