= Planet Hollywood Goa =

Planet Hollywood Beach Resort
- Location within Goa

General information
- Location: Goa, India
- Coordinates: 15.3168°N 73.8997°E
- Opening: December 2014
- Owner: Sachiin Joshi
- Management: Planet Hollywood

Website
- planethollywoodgoa.com

Planet Hollywood Beach Resort, (stylized as planet hollywood) is a luxury 5 star hotel based in Goa, India inspired by the popular Las Vegas casino hotel Planet Hollywood and it was launched in Goa December 2014, it is India's first Hollywood themed Beach Resort in Goa. Sachiin Joshi is the founder and Vice Chairman of this beach resort, who is an Indian film actor, producer and son of JMJ Group owner Jagdish Mohanlal Joshi .
