= I May Never Pass This Way Again =

Song by Murray Wizell and Irving Melsher

Song by Perry Como with the Ray Charles Singers and Mitchell Ayres orchestra
- B-side: "Prayer for Peace"
- Released: May 1958
- Recorded: 1958
- Length: 2:08
- Label: RCA Victor
- Songwriter(s): Murray Wizell, Irving Melcher

"I May Never Pass This Way Again" is a popular song, written by Murray Wizell and Irving Melsher. Perry Como performed the song on his TV show in November 1957, but it was first a hit for Robert Earl in the UK, where it reached No. 14 in 1958.

== Background ==
The lyrics were first written by Murray Wizell, who then asked Irving Melsher to write the music. Soon after the song was written, Wizell and Melsher then became engaged in a legal dispute over the ownership of the song. The song was performed by Perry Como on his US TV show a number of times, first in November 1957; The performance was well-received and generated some interest, but before Como could record it, British singer Robert Earl had recorded and released the song in the UK, together with another version by Ronnie Hilton with the Michael Sammes Singers. Earl's version reached No. 14 on the UK chart in May 1958, while Hilton's version reached No. 27. Como's recording charted a month after the first two, peaking at No. 15 in the UK in June 1958.

Como's version features the Ray Charles Singers and Mitchell Ayres' orchestra. The song was included in his 1958 album When You Come to the End of the Day.

== Other versions ==
The song was covered by other artists in 1958, including Dennis Lotis, and Jo Stafford.

Kate Smith recorded the song in 1965, on her gospel album, How Great Thou Art.
