= Showcase Mall =

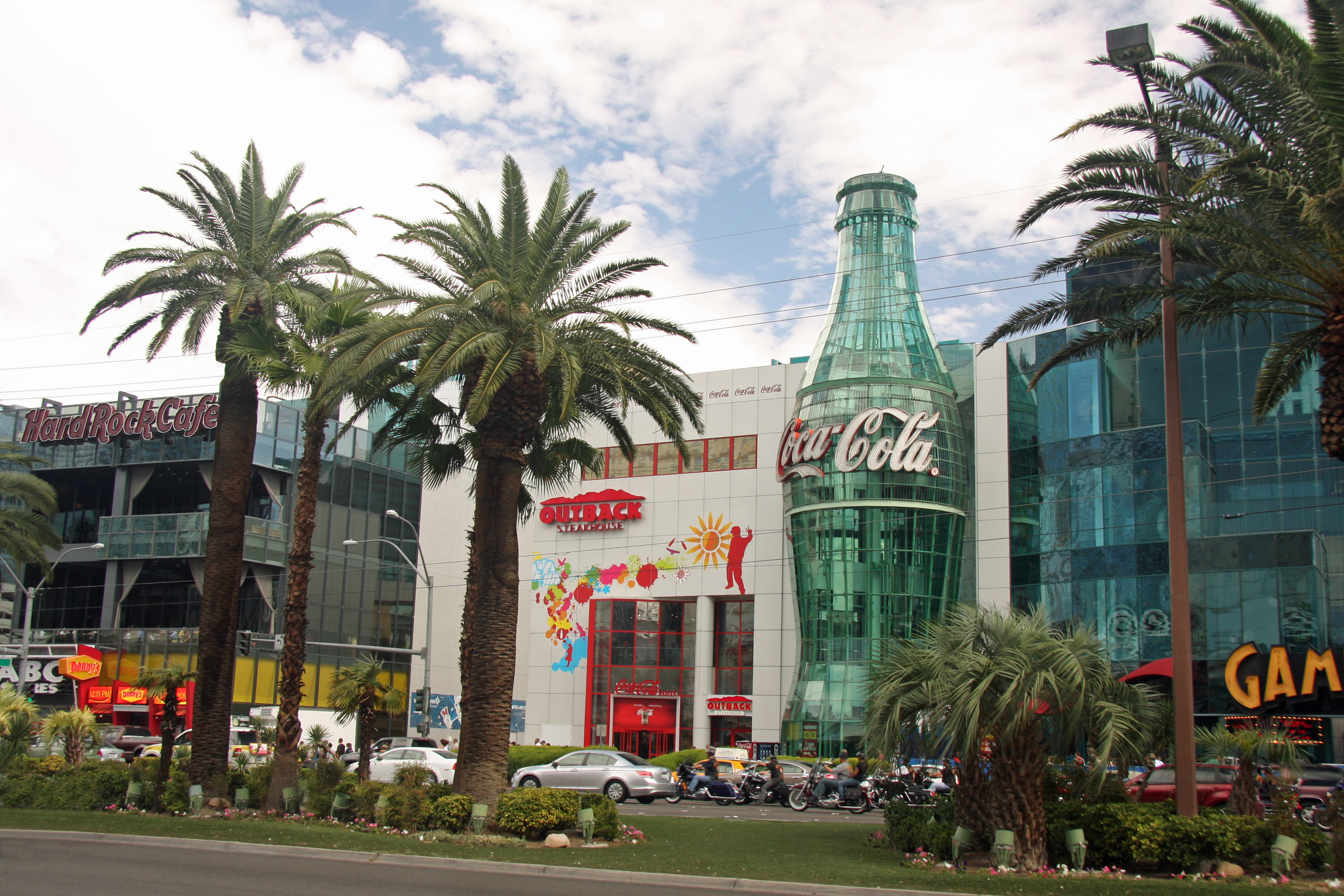
- The mall's facade as seen in October 2009
- Location: Paradise, Nevada, U.S.
- Coordinates: 36.10342°N 115.17236°W
- Address: 3785 South Las Vegas Boulevard
- Opened: December 15, 1996; 29 years ago
- Developer: Forest City Enterprises
- Manager: Gindi Capital and Nakash Holdings
- Owner: Gindi Capital and Nakash Holdings
- Num. of stores: 35+
- Floors: 4
- Parking: Parking lot
- Website: gindicapital.com/success-history/showcase-mall/

Showcase Mall is a shopping center on the Las Vegas Strip in Paradise, Nevada. It is known for its landmark facade, featuring a 100-foot (30 m) tall Coca-Cola bottle and a colossal bag of M&M's.

== History ==
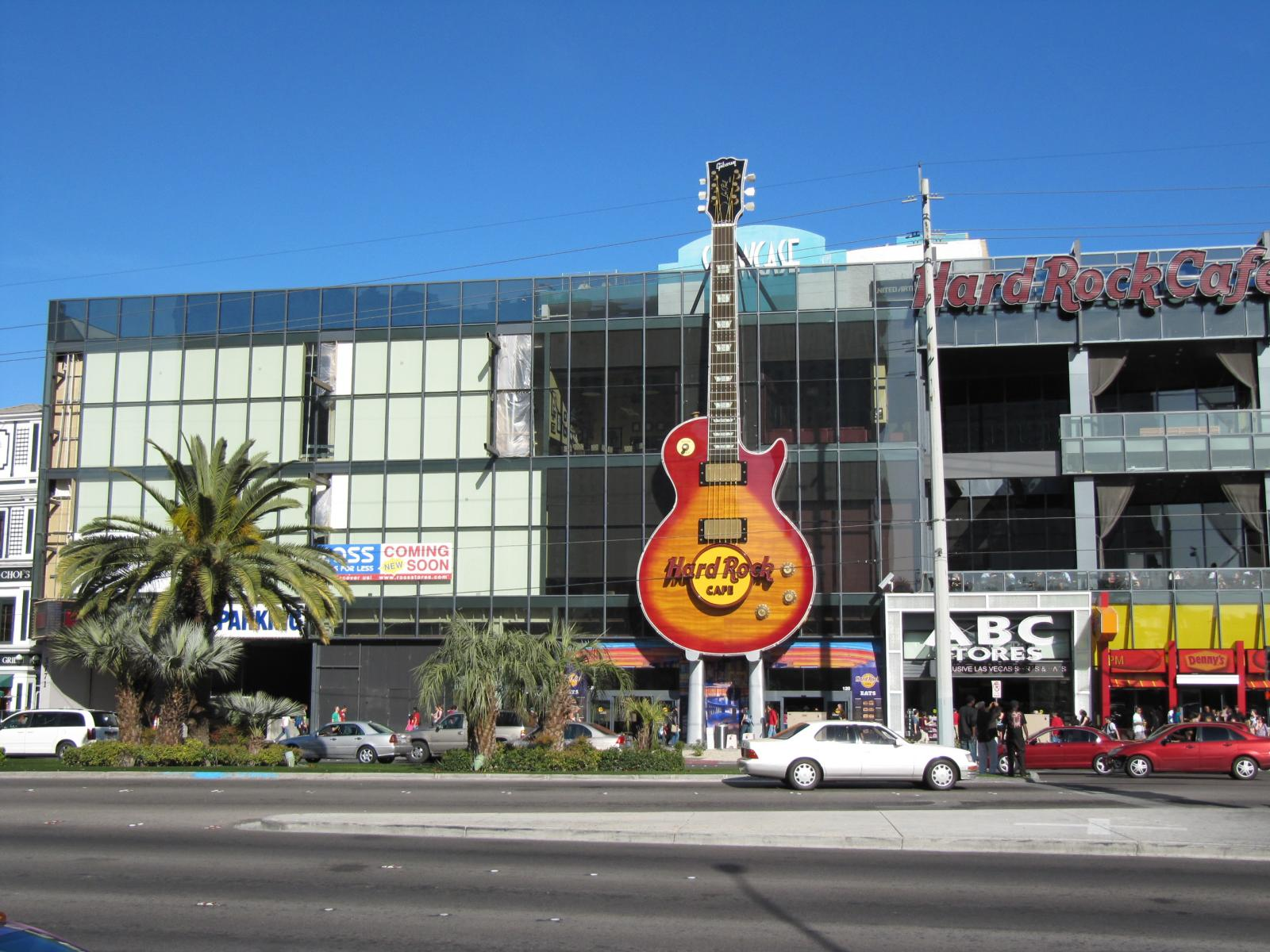
The facade of the mall's third phase in 2010, shortly after it opened. Hard Rock Cafe is visible.

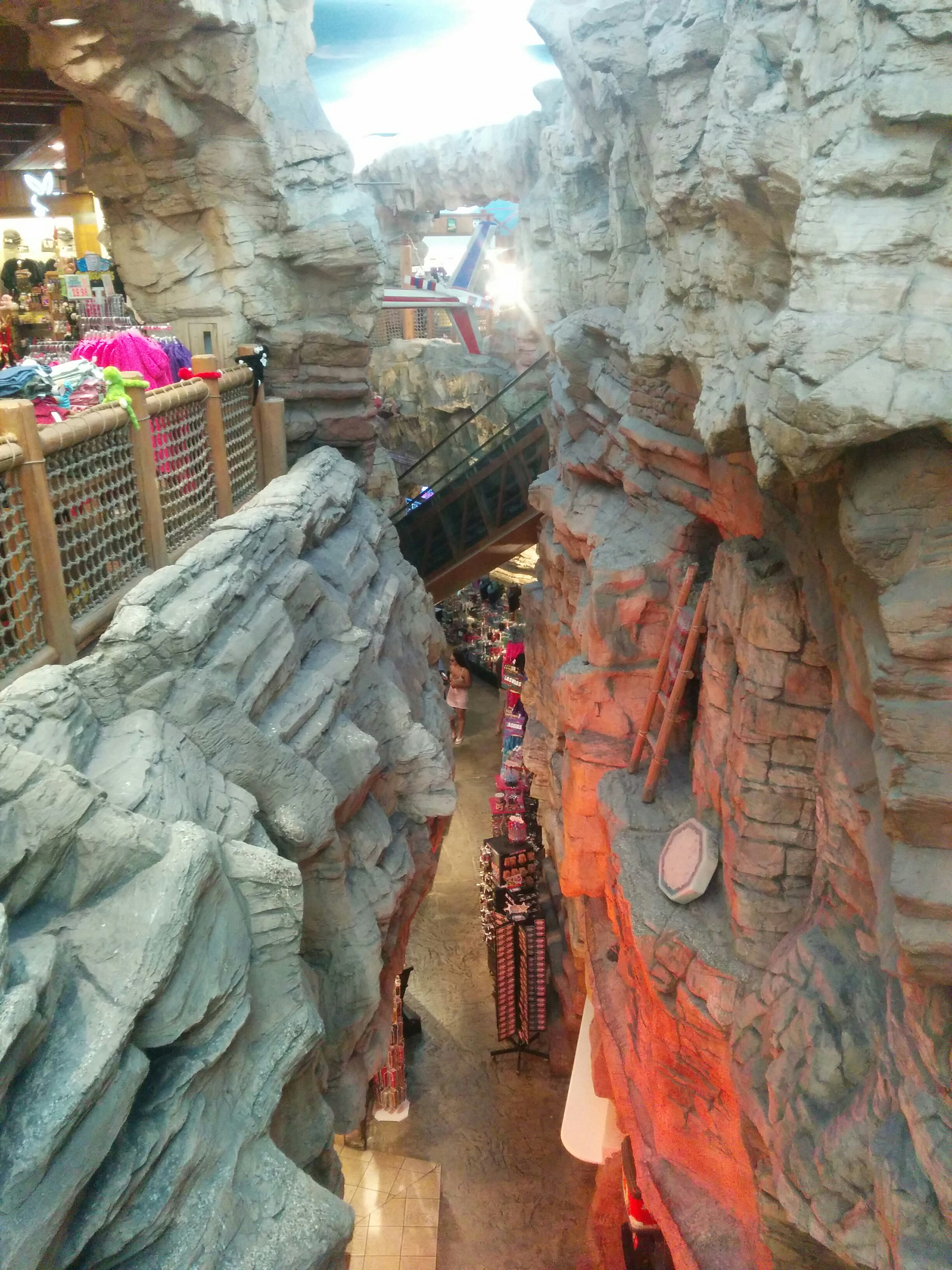
Interior of the Grand Canyon Experience gift shop

After the 1989 announcement of plans for the MGM Grand hotel and casino, attorney Bob Unger recognized the investment potential of an adjacent property where he was handling an eviction case. Unger approached his friend, banker Barry Fieldman, for financing, and the two partnered to form Makena Development Corp. in 1992. Makena purchased Island Plaza, a small shopping center on the site that would become the southern part of Showcase Mall. They then beat out MGM in an effort to purchase two gas stations to the north of Island Plaza.

Forest City Enterprises, a national real estate developer with interests in Las Vegas including the Galleria at Sunset mall, signed on to provide additional funding and expertise to the project, taking a 20% ownership stake.

The first business at the mall, the Official All Star Cafe, opened on December 15, 1996. An eight-screen United Artists Theater opened in March 1997.

Island Plaza was demolished in 1999 to make way for the second phase of Showcase Mall, with 43,000 square feet (4,000 m^{2}) of retail space and a $33-million budget. The second phase, south of the original building, opened in 2000, featuring a gift shop with an interior designed to resemble the Grand Canyon.

North of the original portion of the mall, a parcel occupied by a Denny's restaurant was earmarked for a third phase of construction. In 2003, Westgate Resorts announced a $180-million plan to build a 54-story tower with over 700 timeshare units on the Denny's site. Facing strong opposition from MGM Grand and concerns from county officials about the size of the project, the plan was scaled back to 42 stories, but was ultimately rejected by the Clark County Commission.

In 2005, the developers sold the first phase of the mall for $142 million, to a partnership of San Francisco-based City Center Retail and New York investment firm Angelo Gordon & Co. The buyers also spent $30 million to acquire a leasehold interest in the Denny's site.

The mall's third phase was built in 2009 with 97,400 square feet of space, anchored by a Hard Rock Cafe and a Ross Dress For Less store. The City Center / Angelo Gordon partnership sold this portion of the mall in 2011 to Unilev Capital Corp., a California real estate investment company, for $93.5 million.

In July 2014, City Center and Angelo Gordon sold the original center section of the mall for $145 million to a partnership between the Nakash family (founders of Jordache) and investor Eli Gindi. The Nakashes and Gindi, along with home-curtains manufacturer Elyahu Cohen, then purchased the third, northern section of the mall from Unilev Capital for $139.5 million in January 2015. The Nakashes and Gindi consolidated their control of the mall in December 2015, buying the southern portion from Fieldman for $82.9 million.

A planned expansion of the mall was approved in September 2017. Earlier in the year, the Nakashes and Gindi had paid $59.5 million to purchase a building to the north of the mall, which had previously housed the Smith & Wollensky steakhouse. Plans called for the building to be demolished and replaced with a new four-story, 145,000-square-foot (13,500 m^{2}) building. It would be anchored by Target and Burlington department stores. Both stores opened in 2020 in the new building.
