= Pink Sauce =

Dipping sauce by Chef Pii

The Pink Sauce
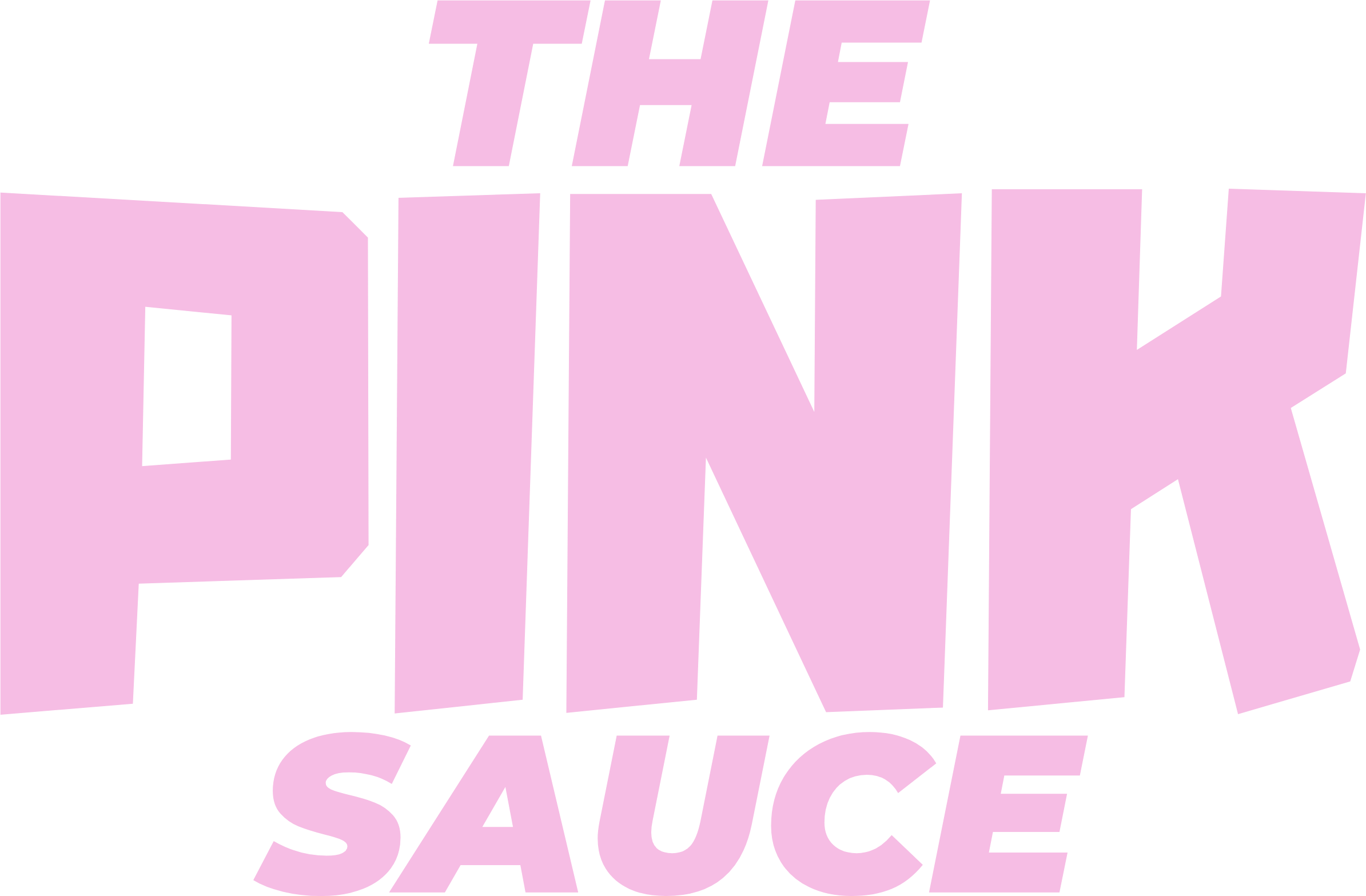
- Logo used since 2022

- Dave Gourmet's Pink Sauce shown in a video in 2023.
- Product type: Condiment
- Current owner: Dave's Gourmet
- Produced by: Veronica Shaw
- Introduced: January 11, 2023; 3 years ago
- Registered as a trademark in: United States; August 4, 2022
- Ambassador: Veronica Shaw
- Website: thepinksauce.com

Pink Sauce is a pink dipping sauce created by TikTok user Veronica Shaw, better known by her screen name Chef Pii, in summer 2022. Food safety and labeling concerns caused the Food and Drug Administration to stop the production and online sale of Pink Sauce. A recipe change and partnership with Dave's Gourmet brought it to store shelves in January 2023.

== History ==
Chef Pii revealed the Pink Sauce in a TikTok video on June 11, 2022, and subsequently began fulfilling orders for the sauce. The sauce went viral on TikTok in the summer of 2022, with the hashtag #pinksauce gaining over 80 million views. Customers noticed inconsistencies in the ingredient list, with many raising concerns that the sauce may cause botulism. TikTok users also pointed out that the sauce was not "FDA-approved" — that is, the sauce's sale was not compliant with the regulations set by the Food and Drug Administration, including typos in its ingredients list, among other issues.

The product was revised for safety purposes and went back on sale on July 1, 2022. It sold out sometime around August 3, 2022. Chef Pii planned to mass-produce the sauce in the fall of 2022. The ingredients include water, sunflower seed oil, raw honey, distilled vinegar, garlic, dragon fruit, pink Himalayan sea salt, dried spices, lemon juice, milk and citric acid.

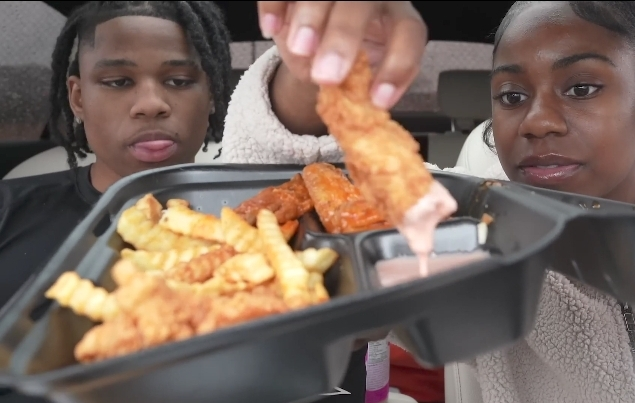
Dave's Gourmet reformulated and redesigned The Pink Sauce (shown here being used as a dipping sauce) for proper consumer consumption in January 2023.

On January 11, 2023, following a reformulation of the recipe and packaging redesign to adhere to Food and Drug Administration regulations, Pink Sauce was made available in 4,000 Walmart locations across the United States.

== Controversy ==
The sauce garnered controversy due to food safety and labeling concerns. Customers noted that the sauce's color varied between batches, the product was poorly packaged, and that the sauce contained milk which, when packaged in a bag, could be infected by botulism. There were also discrepancies between the amount of sauce in the bottle and the amount specified on the label, and allegations that the sauce contained ingredients which were not included on the label (such as mayonnaise). The bottle was also incorrectly labelled with 444 servings instead of 30 serving for 444 grams, causing confusion. Misspellings were also found on the bottle and nutritional information of the product were not available at the website.

Some consumers experienced food poisoning and were hospitalized. Others reported that the product smelled and appeared rotten. One TikTok user faked their death after consuming Pink Sauce as a "social experiment to see how quickly other people could spread misinformation".

On August 21, 2022, YouTuber MatPat made a video about the Pink Sauce on the "Food Theorists" YouTube channel, claiming the ingredients list was unrealistic and that the portions listed on the label were inaccurate. He recommended viewers to not consume the sauce due to potential health risks, but instead to make their own.

=== Response from Chef Pii ===
Chef Pii claimed that she had never weighed the product, so the discrepancy between the amount of sauce indicated on the label and the amount actually in the bottle was due to guesswork. When asked whether her product was approved by the Food and Drug Administration, she stated that her product is not a "medical product", causing further backlash from commenters who noted that the Food and Drug Administration is responsible for regulating food alongside drugs. She also defended herself from the backlash, stating: "My apologies, I’m only human, I’m not perfect” and "this is a small business that is just moving really, really fast."

In October 2022, Chef Pii appeared on Karamo Brown's talk show, Karamo, to address the controversies surrounding her sauce. She appeared alongside fellow TikTok user Alle Brean, a critic of the sauce who had sent a sample to a lab for testing. While the mistake in labeling was acknowledged, Chef Pii did not address concerns over the shipment of perishable ingredients. Chef Pii criticized Brean for her commentary on the sauce, and accused Brean of "fabricating" claims about her product to "tear down [Chef Pii's] business and livelihood". The results of Brean's commissioned lab test were never presented during the segment. Chef Pii's response on the show was met with backlash and the episode was deleted. Chef Pii later apologized to Brean through a private message on TikTok.

=== FDA approval ===
"The F, f'ing, DA, federal, came to my business yesterday. I am 100% compliant, I'm abiding with the FDA...I'm not in trouble. I'm not going to jail. Nobody can accuse the Pink Sauce of anything going forward."

— Chef Pii

On August 2, 2022, the Food and Drug Administration opened an investigation into the Pink Sauce. Chef Pii requested and received help from Dave's Gourmet to appropriately alter the recipe, production, and packaging, to adhere to federal food safety standards. The reformulated product received approval from the Food and Drug Administration and was made available in Walmart stores in January 2023.

=== GoFundMe Page ===
On August 16, 2023, Chef Pii made a GoFundMe page alleging that Dave's Gourmet did not pay her royalties for The Pink Sauce and that she was financially struggling, living off twenty dollars a day and facing eviction. She requested $100,000 on this page. Dave's Gourmet claimed that they had been paying her the contracted amount, which was $120,000 as of August 2023. In October 2023, Dave's Gourmet stated that it had made further payments to Pii, and that it was considering a defamation lawsuit.

== See also ==
- Lunchly
