= Robert Earl (singer) =

English singer (1926–2025)

- Born: Montague Levy; 17 November 1926
- Origin: London, England
- Died: 27 January 2025 (aged 98) Aventura, Florida, U.S.
- Years active: 1950–1970
- Labels: Philips Records

Montague Leigh (born Montague Levy; 17 November 1926 – 27 January 2025) was an English singer of traditional pop music who made his name in the 1950s, enjoying three UK singles chart hits. He was the father of the businessman Robert Earl.

== Life and career ==
Earl was born on 17 November 1926, and hailed from London, England. He began his singing career at local functions around London's East End, and soon progressed to singing with some of the top bands of the day, such as those of Sydney Lipton, Nat Temple and Van Straten. In 1953, Earl auditioned for Norman Newell of Philips Records and was offered a recording contract.

Earl's style was operatic, like fellow crooners David Whitfield, David Hughes and Edmund Hockridge, who were also popular in the 1950s. In 1957, Earl had a contract with George Baines and Will Hammer, and starred in Big Splash, an Aqua Show at The Derby Baths, Blackpool, for the summer season.

Earl enjoyed three chart hits during this period, while signed to Philips: "I May Never Pass This Way Again" (No. 14) and "More Than Ever" ("Come Prima") (No. 26) in 1958 and "The Wonderful Secret of Love" (No. 17) in 1959.

His agent was Michael Sullivan, who also represented Shirley Bassey. After a 20-year career as a professional singer, Earl retired in 1970, and then devoted much of his time to the Grand Order of Water Rats, a showbusiness charitable organisation. He latterly lived in the United States. There have been two CD compilations of his recordings available, The Magic of Robert Earl (Spectrum, 2004), and If You Can Dream, released in 2013 by Vocalion Records.

In July 1989, 19 years after he retired, Earl sang "You'll Never Walk Alone", at the funeral service of his fellow Londoner Tommy Trinder.

Earl died in Aventura, Florida on 27 January 2025, at the age of 98. His wife Daphne predeceased him. His son, also named Robert Earl, is a noted entrepreneur in the hospitality industry.

== Singles discography ==
- "If You Love Me" / "Crying in the Chapel" – Philips PB185 – September 1953
- "You Alone" / "Timber" – PB228 – January 1954
- "The Book" / "Yiddisher Tears" – PB238 – February 1954
- "My Son, My Son" / "Far Away" – PB331 – September 1954
- "Face of an Angel" / "Time After Time" – PB406 – February 1955
- "My Loving Hands" / "I Wonder" – PB433 – April 1955
- "Three Galleons" / "Till the Last Rose Has Faded" – PB481 – July 1955
- "He" / "With Your Love" – PB517 – October 1955
- "My September Love" / "Now and Forever" – PB552 – February 1956
- "Believe in Me" / "If You Can Dream" – PB593 – June 1956
- "More" / "Your Home Can Be a Castle" – PB622 – September 1956
- "I'm Free" / "The Golden Key" – PB657 – January 1957
- "All" / "You Alone" – PB684 – April 1957
- "Fascination" / "Song of the Valley" – PB730 – September 1957
- "My Special Angel" / "There's Only You" – PB767 – November 1957
- "I May Never Pass This Way Again" / "Someone" – PB805 – March 1958 (UK No. 14)
- "More Than Ever (Come Prima)" / "No One But You (In My Heart)" – PB867 – September 1958 (UK No. 26)
- "The Wonderful Secret of Love" / "The Boulevard of Broken Dreams (Gigolo And Gigolette)" – PB891 – January 1959 (UK No. 17)
- "Anything" / "Every Day's a Wonderful Day" – PB927 – 1959
- "The Key" / "The Test of Time" – PB960 – 1959
- "Oh So Wunderbar" / "I'm Rich" – PB986 – 1960
- "A Strange and Wonderful Feeling" / "A Place in the Sun" – PB1015 – 1960
- "Wanderlust" / "One of the Lucky Ones" – PB1077 – 1960
- "Love Me" / "April Serenade" – PB1129 – 1961
- "Lonely" / "Time Will Tell" – 326556BF – 1962
- "Shalom" / "When You're in Love" – PB1209 – 1962
- "Falling in Love with Love" / "Give Me My Chance" – BF1289 – 1963
- "Walk Hand in Hand" / "Never" – BF1379 – 1964
