= Official All Star Café =

Chain of sports-themed restaurants

Official All Star Cafe
- Type: Division
- Industry: Casual dining restaurants
- Founded: 1995
- Defunct: 2007
- Headquarters: Orlando, Florida, United States
- Owner: Planet Hollywood International Inc.

The Official All Star Cafe was a chain of sports themed restaurants developed by Planet Hollywood. Planet Hollywood recruited Wayne Gretzky, Joe Montana, Shaquille O'Neal, Ken Griffey Jr., Andre Agassi, and Monica Seles to invest in the concept. Restaurants featured "stadium cuisine" and sales of professional sports merchandise and souvenirs.

== History ==
The chain's first location opened on December 18, 1995, at Times Square in New York City. Two more locations opened the next year in Cancun and at the Showcase Mall on the Las Vegas Strip.

Planet Hollywood International announced on September 25, 1997, the formation of a joint venture for an Official All Star Hotel.

With theme restaurants' novelty wearing off and Planet Hollywood's reorganizing by December 1998, Planet placed the chain up for sale. Also, the plans for a Chicago location were canceled.

From 1997 until 2001, Official All Star Cafe locations also were to be operated alongside Planet Movies by AMC entertainment complexes at select locations in the United States. An Official All Star Cafe was also located at Disney's Wide World of Sports Complex in 1997, its opening year.

With its parent company's first bankruptcy filing of October 11, 1999, one location was closed, leaving nine corporate locations. In February 2000 after exiting bankruptcy, Disney offered to purchase the location at its sports complex. The last Official All Star Cafe, the Disney's Wide World of Sports location, closed on September 23, 2007.

== Hotel ==
The Official All Star Hotel was a joint venture of Planet Hollywood International (20%), Vornado Realty Trust (40%), and Hotel Properties, Limited (40%). Hotel Properties, Limited is a Singapore company involved in entertainment, lodging, and retail whose managing director at the time, Ong Beng Seng, was then a major stockholder of Planet Hollywood and an investor in rival Hard Rock Cafe. Planet Hollywood would have received trademark royalties for use of "Official All Star" as a percentage of merchandise sale and hotel room rate at the hotel.

Planet Hollywood, Vornado Realty Trust, and Hotel Properties formed on September 24, 1997, a joint venture for an Official All Star Hotel. The joint venture would revamp the Hotel Pennsylvania over a two-year period. The plans were halted by mid-1999 as Planet Hollywood sold its stake to a New Jersey–based real estate investment trust.
