= Buca di Beppo =

American restaurant chain

Buca Texas Restaurants, LP
- Trade name: Buca di Beppo Italian Restaurant
- Type: Subsidiary
- Industry: Restaurant
- Genre: Casual dining
- Founded: 1993; 33 years ago in Minneapolis, MN
- Founder: Phil Roberts
- Headquarters: Atlanta, Georgia, U.S.
- Number of locations: 40
- Area served: United States
- Key people: Daniel Halpern, CEO, Jackmont Hospitality; Jeff Ritson, Senior Vice-President, Buca di Beppo
- Products: Italian-American food, including spaghetti and meatballs, fettuccine alfredo, lasagna, chicken parmesan, pizza, salads, and desserts.
- Total equity: N/A – privately held company
- Number of employees: 5,000–10,000
- Parent: Independent (1993–2008); Planet Hollywood International, Inc. (2008–2024); Main Street Capital Corporation (2024–present)
- Website: www.dineatbuca.com

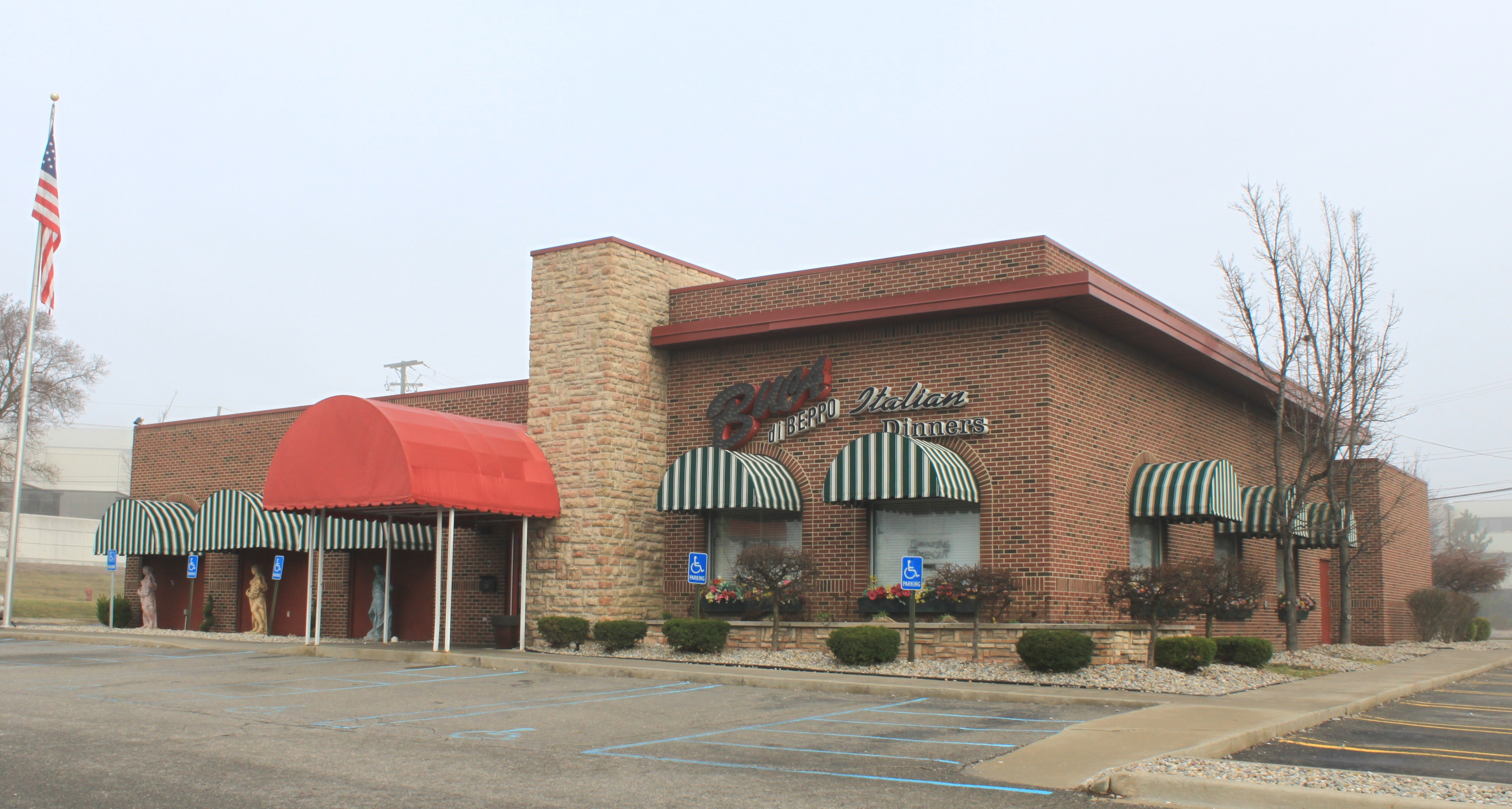
Buca di Beppo, Livonia, Michigan

Buca di Beppo is an American restaurant chain specializing in Italian-American food. (Note: Buca, which literally means "hole" or "pit", can be a dialectal word in Tuscany for a small room or place, and Beppo is a diminutive of the name Giuseppe.) The chain of 40 establishments across the United States was previously a subsidiary of Planet Hollywood from 2008–2024. In November 2024, Main Street Capital Corporation invested over $30 million to acquire Buca di Beppo out of bankruptcy, hoping to position it for long-term success. To lead its attempted resurgence, Main Street partnered with Atlanta-based Jackmont Hospitality Inc. to oversee operations as the brand tries to embark on its next chapter.

== Menu ==
The food at Buca di Beppo is served family style, each item served à la carte and shared among the dining party. Some locations also have a lunch menu, featuring individual-sized portions.

== History ==
Phil Roberts founded Buca di Beppo in 1993 inspired by "red sauce joints", Italian-American family restaurants in the northeast United States. Roberts wanted his restaurant's depiction to be "intentionally in bad taste, but good-natured bad taste". He hired Vittorio Renda, a Milanese chef, and Roberts's architect son decorated the restaurant with Italians' family photographs from flea markets. In 1996, a new CEO, Joseph Micatrotto, brought less exaggerated Italian-American cultural depictions, based on his family's history, to the chain as it prepared to go public.

The first restaurant, named Buca Little Italy, was opened in the basement level of a Minneapolis apartment building in 1993 by Twin Cities restaurant company Parasole Restaurant Holdings. Five years later, it was spun off and renamed Buca di Beppo. By 1999, there were 21 locations when Buca, Inc., began trading on the NASDAQ stock exchange. In December 2001, the company acquired the Boston-based Vinny Testa restaurant chain for $18 million. By this time, Buca operated 68 locations in 22 states.

In February 2005, the U.S. Securities and Exchange Commission ordered an investigation into the company to determine if it had violated securities laws relating to its accounting practices between February 2001 and March 2005. A month later, Buca had dismissed two top executives. In February 2006, a class-action lawsuit was filed against Buca di Beppo on behalf of the company's investors, accusing the company of overstating its revenue and failing to follow generally accepted accounting practices. Three Buca di Beppo sites were closed and the Vinny T's chain was listed as "discontinued operations" in the company's fourth quarter 2005 earnings statement.

Buca attempted to sell the Vinny T chain, but by May 2006, the company announced that it would instead convert the Vinny T's stores into Buca di Beppo locations. On September 25, 2006, Buca, Inc. sold its 11 Vinny T's of Boston restaurants to Bertucci's Corp. for $6.8 million.

On June 7, 2006, the SEC filed securities fraud charges against Micatrotto, former CFO Greg Gadel, and former Controller Daniel J. Skrypek for stealing more than $200,000 from the company.

On August 5, 2008, Planet Hollywood's parent company, Planet Hollywood International, Inc., agreed to purchase the Buca chain for $28.5 million. Under terms of the deal, Buca became a wholly owned subsidiary of Planet Hollywood. Its founder, Robert Earl, restored Buca di Beppo's gaudy decor of photographs covering walls.

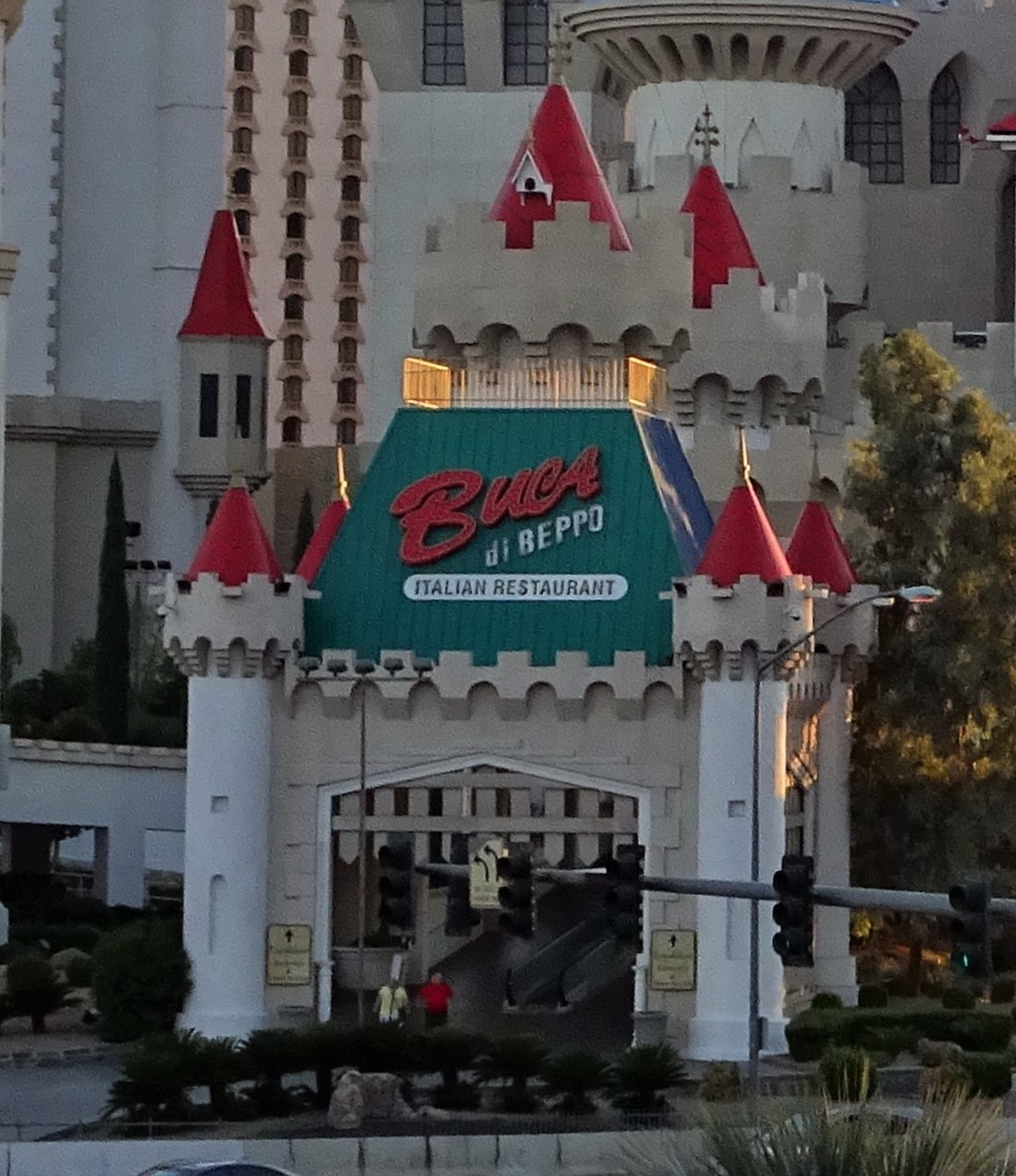
The Buca di Beppo at Excalibur Hotel & Casino in Las Vegas, Nevada, opened in 2011.

In 2011, Buca moved its headquarters from Minneapolis to Orlando, Florida, home of its parent company, citing financial incentives. In 2012, Rick Tasman was named CEO & President. In 2015, Rich Saultz was named the new CEO & President and is currently in that position.

By 2016, the company had 100 locations in the U.S. and U.K.

As of 2019, the chain has 77 restaurants in 24 states; Honolulu was the highest-grossing location. In 2019, Earl Enterprises announced that a point-of-sale credit card breach affected credit-card users who visited Buca (or other Earl Enterprise-owned restaurants) between May 23, 2018, and March 18, 2019.

In November 2024, Main Street Capital Corporation, a Houston-based private investment firm, acquired Buca di Beppo following the company's August 2024 bankruptcy filing. To lead its resurgence, Main Street has partnered with Jackmont Hospitality Inc. to oversee operations as the brand embarks on the next chapter of growth.

=== Bankruptcy ===
On August 1, 2024, Buca di Beppo closed 13 underperforming restaurants nationwide, caused by impacts of the COVID-19 pandemic as part of the decision.

On August 5, 2024, Buca di Beppo filed for Chapter 11 bankruptcy. The company announced it would use bankruptcy proceedings to improve operations and will also sell itself. On November 6, 2024, it was announced that Buca di Beppo would be sold to private equity firm Main Street Capital Corporation for $27 million after a deal was approved in bankruptcy court on November 1.

== See also ==
- List of Italian restaurants
