= Bertucci's =

U.S. restaurant chain

Bertucci's Brick Oven Pizza & Pasta

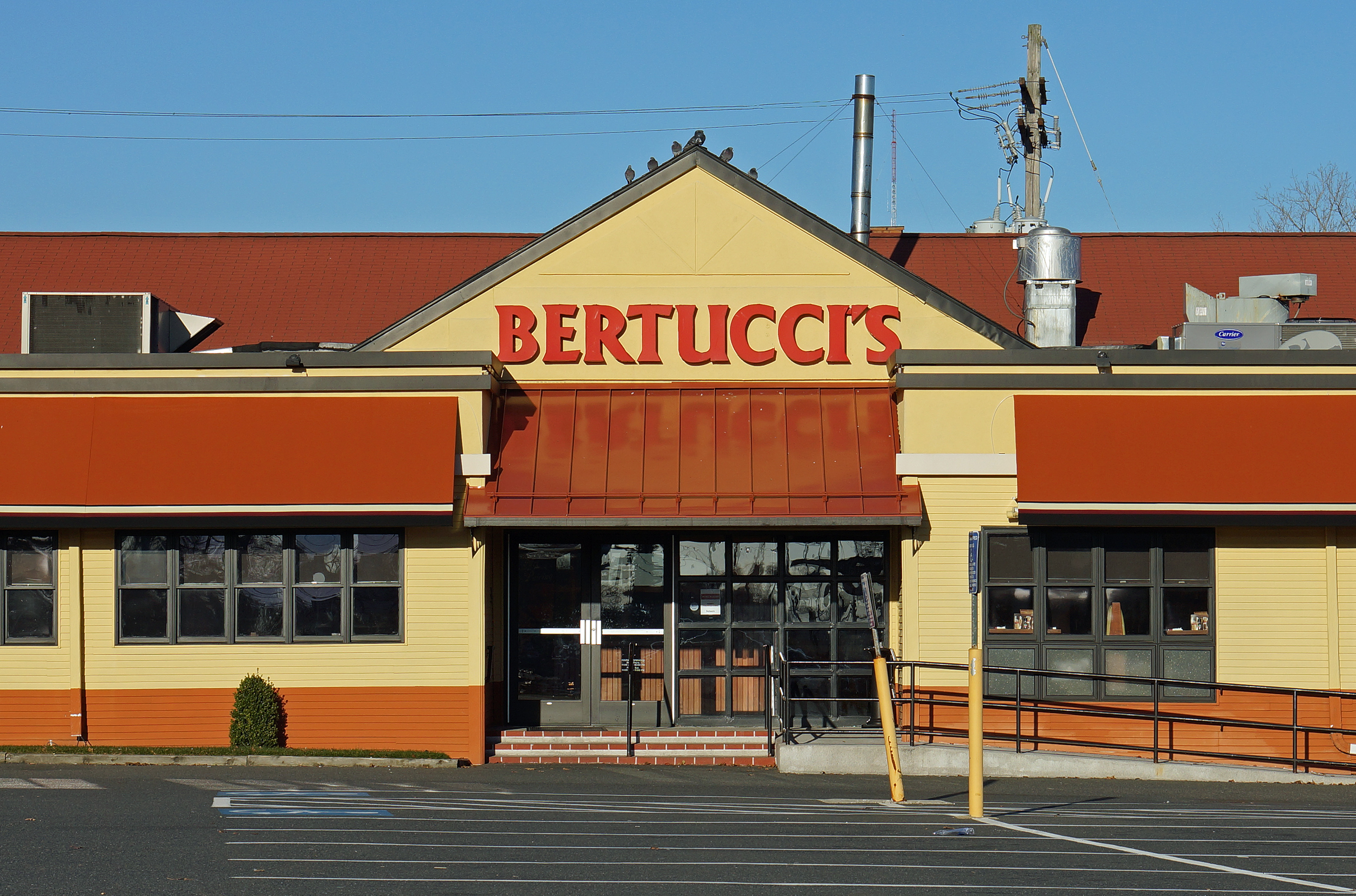
- A Bertucci's in Peabody, Massachusetts (Closed 2023)
- Type: Subsidiary
- Industry: Restaurant
- Genre: Casual dining
- Founded: November 3, 1981; 44 years ago, in Davis Square, Somerville, Massachusetts, as (Bertucci's Pizza and Bocce)
- Founder: Joseph Crugnale
- Fate: Chapter 11 bankruptcy
- Headquarters: Northborough, Massachusetts; U.S.
- Key people: Len Carpenter (CEO)
- Products: Italian-American cuisine: pizza; pasta; soups; salads; desserts
- Parent: N.E. Restaurant Co. Inc. (1998–2001); Bertucci's Corp. (2001–2018); Earl Enterprises (2018–present)
- Website: www.bertuccis.com

Bertucci's is an American chain of Italian restaurants offering pizza and other Italian food, founded by Joey Crugnale in Davis Square, Somerville, Massachusetts, in November 1981. The company expanded rapidly during the 1990s. N.E. Restaurant Co. Inc. bought out Bertucci's in 1998, adopting the Bertucci's Corp. name in 2001. Today, Bertucci's has 11 locations; 9 in Massachusetts, and one each in Delaware and Pennsylvania.

== History ==
Joseph ("Joey") Crugnale, Bertucci's founder, was born in Sulmona, Abruzzo, Italy. He landed his first job in a restaurant while in high school, after immigrating to Boston. He worked as a porter at the Sonesta Hotel in Cambridge, Massachusetts. In 1974, he opened his first ice cream stand. In 1975, he refinanced his father's home and purchased Steve's Ice Cream from founder Steve Herrell for $80,000. Crugnale established 26 stores before selling the concept to Integrated Resources in 1983 for $4.5 million.

The first 'Bertucci's Pizza and Bocce' was opened in November 1981, two doors from Steve's Ice Cream in Davis Square. Bertucci's was opened to eliminate the possibility of an ice cream competitor moving in. The name was found in a magazine during a flight to New York City. The original location had a bocce court in the basement.

=== 1980s ===
USA Today listed Bertucci's as one of America's top 10 pizza restaurants in 1989; by then, its headquarters were in Woburn, Massachusetts.

=== 1990s ===
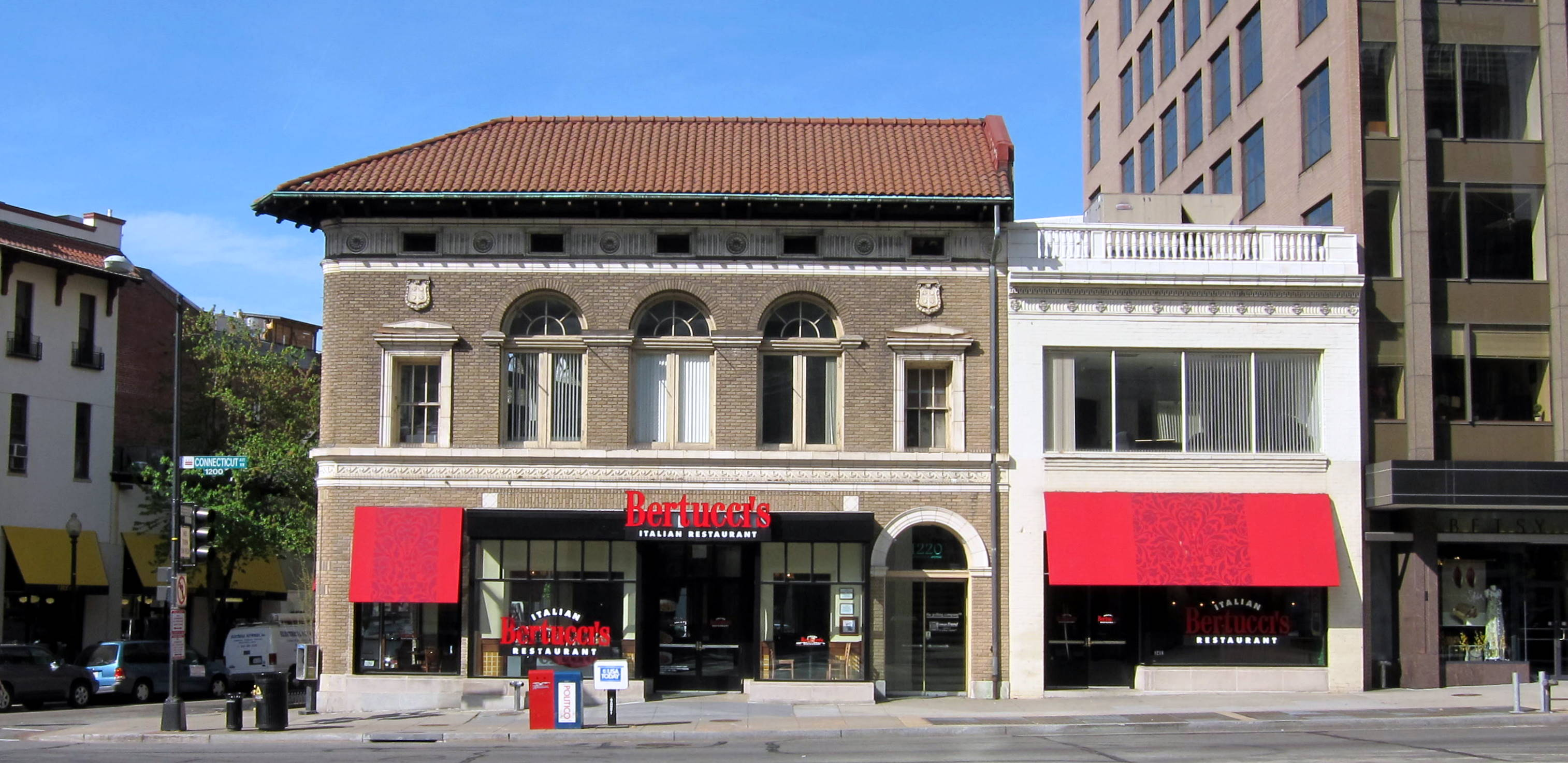
Bertucci's in the Dupont Circle neighborhood of Washington, D.C. (Now closed)

Bertucci's became a publicly owned company in July 1991. The company offered 21 units for $13 per share. That year sales increased 30% to $37.4 million and net income increased by 90% to $3 million. Stock prices nearly doubled, selling for $24.75 per share.

Joey Crugnale attempted to take the chain private again in 1998, but though the board approved his attempt, he was outbid. N.E. Restaurant Co. Inc. purchased Bertucci's for $10.50 a share during the buyout.

=== 2000s ===
In 2001, N.E. Restaurant Co. Inc. sold its Chili's and On the Border restaurants to Brinker International, and changed its name to Bertucci's Corp. A $4 million advertising tagline "Everybody Eats" was developed in April 2002. In 2006, Italian chain Vinny T's rebranded as Buca di Beppo and withdrew from some markets. As part of their consolidation, they sold 11 Boston locations to Bertucci's Corp. By the end of the decade, the chain had 92 locations.

=== 2010s ===
In 2011, The Boston Globe did a DNA investigation of fish available in area restaurants and supermarkets and determined that 50% of the fish was not properly labeled as to species. Bertucci's was asked for comment, and acted swiftly to correct the issue – an article on their search to find an acceptable serving of cod to replace the hake that their supplier had sourced them with appeared at the same time as the report on the investigation.

In December 2012, Bertucci's opened its first 2Ovens concept restaurant in the revamped White City shopping center in Shrewsbury, Massachusetts. The brick ovens were the primary method of cooking in the restaurant.

==== 2016 Taunton attack ====
On May 10, 2016, two people were stabbed at the Bertucci's restaurant at the former Silver City Galleria Mall in Taunton, Massachusetts. One of the stabbing victims, 56-year-old George Heath, was killed while trying to rescue the other stabbing victim, a pregnant 26-year-old waitress Sheenah Savoy, who survived. The incident occurred at about 7:00 p.m. EDT.

The attacker was identified as 28-year-old Arthur DaRosa. According to DaRosa's sister, he checked himself into a local hospital the night before the attack and was released the following morning. He was also reportedly mentally ill and had been struggling with depression for years.

The attack started when DaRosa crashed his car on Myricks Street, located near the mall. DaRosa then began to run around the area erratically, attempting to break into a number of homes. He eventually broke into a house and stabbed Patricia Slavin, 80, and her daughter Kathleen, 48, with a kitchen knife. Patricia died in the hospital while Kathleen was being treated for life-threatening injuries. DaRosa then stole a Honda Accord from the Slavin household, crashed it into the Macy's, before attacking at Bertucci's, and then finally assaulted three other people before being shot dead by an off-duty police officer.

=== 2020s ===
On April 23, 2025, Bertucci's opened its first location of their new restaurant concept, Bertucci's Pronto, a fast-casual restaurant format.

== Bankruptcies and closures ==
=== 2010s ===
On April 15, 2018, Bertucci's filed for Chapter 11 bankruptcy. The chain closed 15 of their locations, and the plans were to hold an auction for the remainder of the company. The closures included one location in Hauppauge, New York, three locations in Connecticut, in Manchester, Orange, and Southington, four locations in Pennsylvania, in Bryn Mawr, Norristown, North Wales, and Warrington, and seven locations in Massachusetts, in Amherst, Longmeadow, Randolph, Taunton, Wayland, West Springfield, and the only 2Ovens location. The opening bid would be for $19.7 million and if no higher bid was made, an affiliate of Right Lane Capital had agreed to purchase the chain. The company owed approximately $9 million to their suppliers and $110 million to financial lenders. In June 2018, the Bertucci's chain agreed to be acquired by the corporate parent of Planet Hollywood, Earl Enterprises, for $20 million.

=== 2020s ===
In July 2022, the Bertucci’s location in Andover closed. In September 2022, the Bertucci's location in Woburn closed. On December 5, 2022, Bertucci's filed for Chapter 11 bankruptcy for a second time in four years, blaming declining sales and loss in revenue from the COVID-19 pandemic, and the inflation causing the company to increase dramatically in supply issues. As a result of the bankruptcy, one restaurant in Marlton, New Jersey, two restaurants in Connecticut, in Avon and Newington, two restaurants in New Hampshire, in Manchester and Salem, and five restaurants in Massachusetts, in Beverly, Brockton, Canton, Marlborough, and North Attleborough, were closed. None of Earl Enterprises' other owned companies were affected from the bankruptcy filing. The last New Hampshire restaurant in Nashua closed the following year. In March 2023, the Needham and Peabody locations in Massachusetts were closed. In June 2023, Bertucci's closed its last New Jersey location in Mount Laurel. In October 2023, two more Massachusetts Bertucci's locations were closed, located in Cambridge, and in Lexington. In December 2024, the Swampscott location closed. In March 2025, yet another two Massachusetts locations closed, in Holliston and Plymouth.

On April 24, 2025, Bertucci's filed for Chapter 11 bankruptcy for the third time in seven years. The company blamed continued declining consumer demand, and promised that it would quickly reorganize themselves and focus on their new restaurant concept, Bertucci's Pronto, a fast-casual restaurant format, which opened its first location on 22 Tremont Street in Boston the day before. Bertucci's immediately shuttered six of its locations as a result of the filing, including one Maryland location in Timonium, its last Rhode Island location in Warwick, and four Massachusetts locations, in Braintree, Mansfield, North Andover, and Norwood. In June 2025, the last Maryland location in Columbia closed. In August 2025, Bertucci's closed its last Connecticut spot in Glastonbury. In early September 2025, the Massachusetts restaurant closed in Reading. The next closure of a Bertucci's location would happen over a year later, where its last Virginia location in Springfield closed permanently in late September 2026.

== See also ==
- List of Italian restaurants
- List of pizza chains of the United States
