= Virtual restaurant =

Delivery-only restaurant

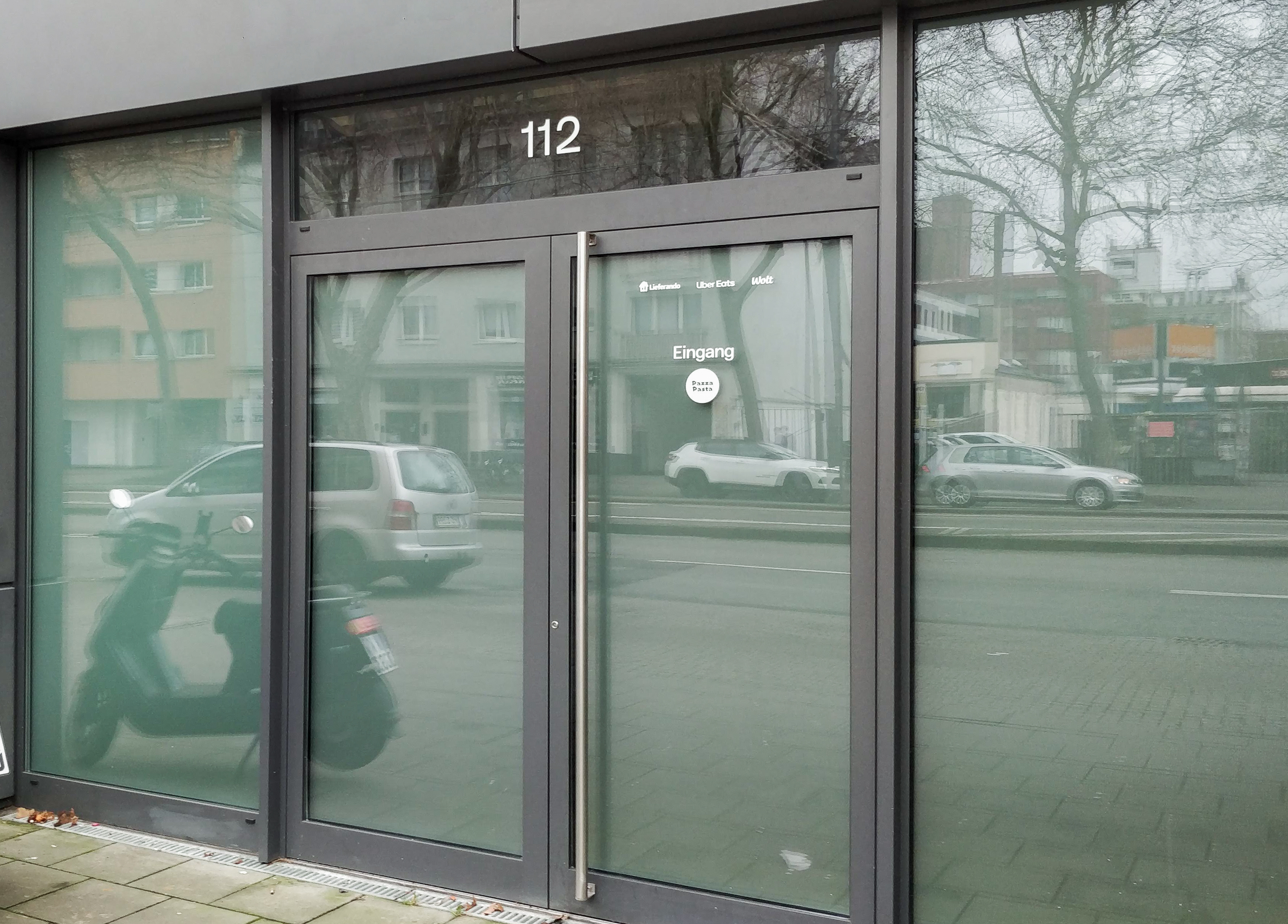
Entrance to a virtual restaurant in Cologne, Germany, with subtle signage for delivery driver collections

A virtual restaurant, also known as a ghost kitchen, cloud kitchen or dark kitchen, is a food service business that serves customers exclusively by delivery and pick-up based on phone and online ordering. Virtual restaurants are stand-alone businesses that either operate out of an existing restaurant's kitchen or from a separate kitchen set-up away from a restaurant. By not having a full-service restaurant with a storefront and dining room, virtual restaurants can economize by occupying cheaper real estate. The reduced space lowers overall overhead and operational costs, thus yielding higher profit margins, as the price of the food provided is typically not changed. The virtual restaurant's single kitchen format allows for multiple brands to share kitchen space.

== Background ==
Rebel Foods pioneered the cloud kitchen business, launching its first cloud kitchen in 2015 and converting to an exclusively cloud-kitchen model in 2016.

With the rise of urbanization and an increasingly busy lifestyle, the demand for food delivery services in the United States has surged, resulting in a shift from traditional dining experiences to ordering food online. Virtual restaurants gained significant notice during the COVID-19 pandemic in 2020, when many restaurants were either completely idle due to restrictions on public dining, or curtailed significantly as very low numbers of patrons were permitted to be served on-premises even as the situation recovered. At the same time, demand for home delivery of food expanded as people stayed at home. Ghost kitchens helped brick-and-mortar restaurants recoup their losses and minimize employee layoffs by allowing them to prepare food for multiple brands and keep themselves in business.

Virtual restaurants are set up within existing restaurants, allowing businesses to cut costs by sharing space. Virtual restaurants also save money by avoiding dine-in service through reliance on delivery service. Virtual restaurants rely on their own delivery drivers or third-party delivery apps such as Grubhub, Uber Eats, Postmates and DoorDash to deliver food to customers.

A typical virtual restaurant location is able to accommodate the preparation of several different types of cuisines. The strategy of having multiple brands and cuisines can target a broader range of customers. Food can be prepared by specialty chefs or any range of cooks. Virtual restaurants are intended for people looking for professionally cooked food with the convenience of local delivery.

== Function ==
The lack of a physical customer service location allows companies to experiment with new menus, brands, and concepts with ease and low risk. Menus can be adjusted to match current trends or target multiple demographics with a variety of cuisines. The online nature of ghost kitchens makes it possible for virtual restaurants to track customer data and analytics through the food ordering process and make data-driven decisions. They can track the popularity of items, wait times, and customer feedback via ratings and adjust their menus accordingly.

== Criticism ==
Ghost restaurants have been criticized for unpleasant working conditions, cramped and windowless kitchen spaces, and acting as fronts for other restaurants.

In the United Kingdom, restaurant operators The Restaurant Group and Casual Dining Group were criticised in 2019 over a lack of transparency regarding virtual restaurant brands. The companies were found to be operating several virtual brands which sold similar or identical food to their more popular high-street brands.

== List of associated chain restaurants ==
Several virtual restaurant brands have associated brick-and-mortar locations. The following are virtual restaurants known to use ghost kitchens.

=== Brazil ===
- Aussie Chicken is a ghost kitchen operated by Outback Steakhouse and Abbraccio.

=== Canada ===
- Durty Dawgs is a ghost kitchen operated by The Pickle Barrel.

=== United States ===
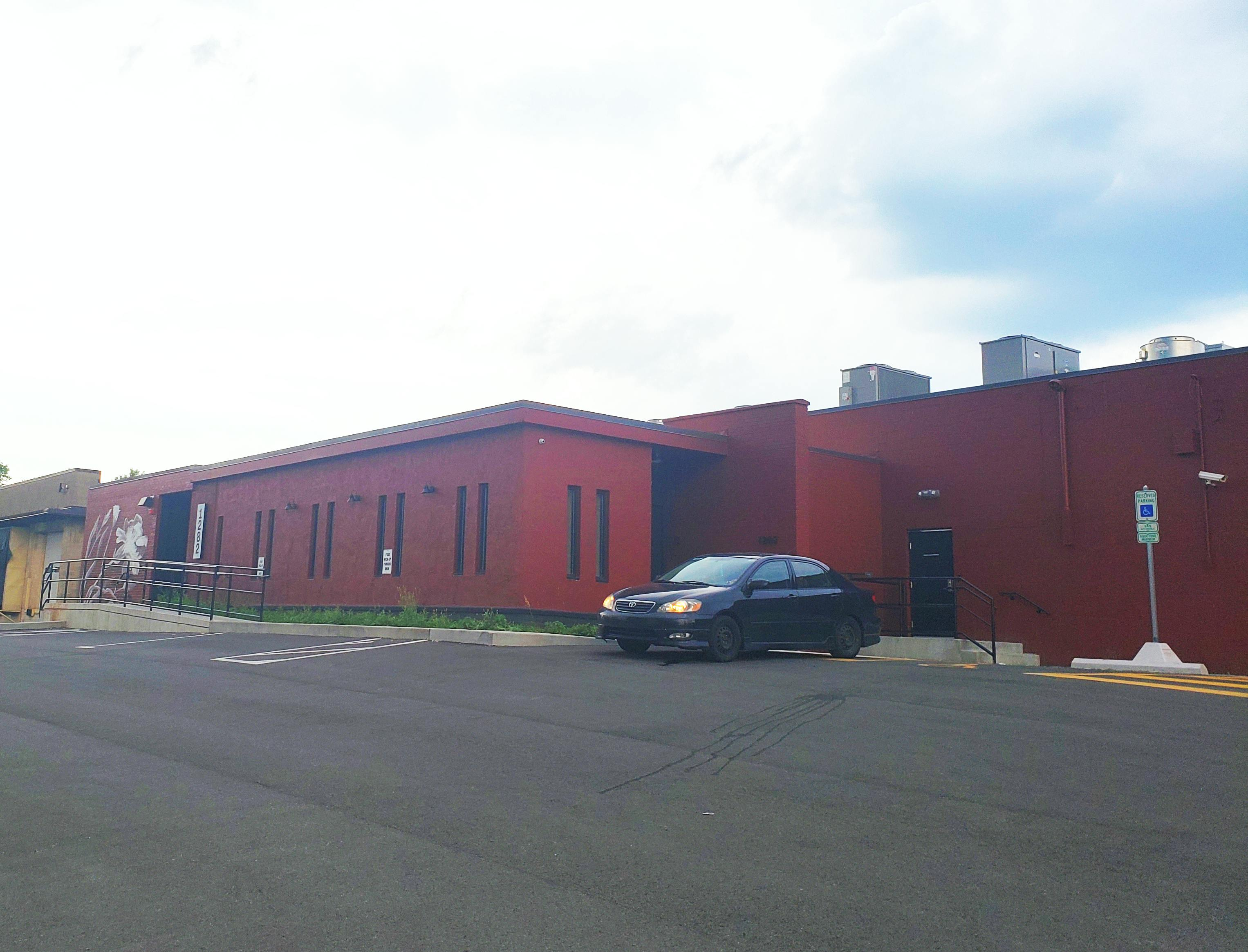
A virtual restaurant in Columbus, Ohio in 2020

- The Burger Den, Banda Burrito, and The Meltdown are ghost kitchen brands owned and operated by Denny's.
- Conviction Chicken is a ghost kitchen operated by TGI Fridays.
- Cosmic Wings and Neighborhood Wings are ghost kitchens operated by Applebee's.
- Dockside Charlie's, Coop & Run, and Underground Chuck's were ghost kitchens operated by O'Charley's.
- Fresh Set, Chicken Sammy's, and The Wing Dept. are ghost kitchens operated by Red Robin.
- Guy Fieri's Flavortown Sports Kitchen is a virtual restaurant chain operated by chef Guy Fieri.
- Hootie's Burger Bar, Hootie's Bait and Tackle, and Hootie's Chicken Tenders are ghost kitchen brands owned and operated by Hooters.
- It's Just Wings and Maggiano's Italian Classics are ghost kitchens operated by Brinker International, which owns Chili's and Maggiano's Little Italy.
- Libby's BBQ is a ghost kitchen operated by Ruby Tuesday.
- Pasqually's Pizza & Wings is a ghost kitchen brand owned and operated by Chuck E. Cheese.
- Rotisserie Roast is a ghost kitchen operated by Boston Market.
- Slo Roast is a ghost kitchen operated by BJ's Restaurants.
- Tender Shack is a ghost kitchen operated by Outback Steakhouse.
- Thighstop is a ghost kitchen operated by Wingstop.
- Thrilled Cheese, Super Mega Dilla, Pardon My Cheesesteak, and Tender Fix are all ghost kitchens operated by IHOP.
- Twisted Tenders and Embers BBQ are ghost kitchens operated by Logan's Roadhouse.
- Wild Burger is a ghost kitchen operated by Buffalo Wild Wings.
- Wing Nut is a ghost kitchen operated by Primanti Bros.
- Wow Bao, Wingville, and Macaroniville are ghost kitchens operated by Fazoli's.

== See also ==
- Dark store
- Concession stand
- Food truck
- Virtual Dining Concepts
