= Dave's Gourmet =

American sauce manufacturer

Dave's Gourmet hot sauce

Dave's Gourmet is a company notable for creating and introducing Dave's Insanity Sauce, which formerly held the title of "world's hottest sauce." The sauce is widely distributed through gourmet hot sauce boutiques and online hot-sauce sites.

== History ==
The original Dave's Insanity Sauce premiered around 1993 and was one of the first sauces to be made directly from capsaicin extract, allowing it to be hotter than the hottest habanero-pepper sauces of the day. It has been rated at 180,000 Scoville units, compared with 2,500 for Tabasco sauce. Part of the messaging behind the sauce name (Insanity) was founder Dave Hirschkop's wearing of a straitjacket at events promoting his products.

== Varieties ==
The following varieties of Dave's Gourmet sauces are currently available:

=== Standard sauces ===
- Cool Cayenne Sauce
- Ginger Peach Hot Sauce
- Hurtin' Jalapeño Sauce
- Hurtin' Habanero Sauce
- Jammin' Jerk Sauce
- Roasted Garlic Hot Sauce
- Roasted Red Pepper & Chipotle Hot Sauce
- Scotch Bonnet Hot Sauce
- Dave's Steak Sauce
- Temporary Insanity Sauce
- Insanity Sauce
- Total Insanity Sauce
- Ultimate Insanity Sauce
- Ghost Pepper Naga Jolokia Hot Sauce
- Scorpion Sauce
- Carolina Reaper Sauce
