= Planet Hollywood =

North American company of theme restaurants inspired by North American cinema

Planet Hollywood International Inc.
- Type: Private
- Industry: Hospitality
- Genre: Celebrity
- Founded: October 22, 1991; 35 years ago in New York City, New York, US
- Founders: Keith Barish; Robert Earl
- Headquarters: Orlando, Florida, U.S.
- Number of locations: 3 (2025)
- Services: Restaurant; retail; hotel; casino
- Owner: Robert Earl
- Parent: Earl Enterprises
- Subsidiaries: Planet Hollywood Resorts International, LLC
- Website: www.planethollywood.com

Planet Hollywood International Inc. (stylized as planet Hollywood, planet Hollywood observatory and ph) is a themed restaurant chain inspired by the popular portrayal of Hollywood. The company is owned by Earl Enterprises Corporation, which was founded by Robert Earl.

It was launched in New York City on October 22, 1991, with the backing of Hollywood stars Sylvester Stallone, Bruce Willis, Demi Moore, and Arnold Schwarzenegger. The recruited actors were paid for their appearances and endorsements through an employee stock ownership plan. Further celebrity endorsement included actors Whoopi Goldberg, Jean-Claude Van Damme, Don Johnson, Cindy Crawford, Melanie Griffith, Tom Arnold, Wesley Snipes, and Danny Glover; director John Hughes; and comedian Roseanne Barr.

At its 1990s peak, Planet Hollywood operated more than 60 worldwide locations. After financial problems, the company filed for bankruptcy on 12 October 1999. The restructuring plan left the company with 35 locations in 2000 and their numbers continued to decline. As of May 2025, there are three restaurants and five hotels operating.

== Background ==
Robert Earl had a history of opening theme-restaurants first in Britain (1970s) and in Orlando, Florida. In 1987, he sold this restaurant group (President Entertainments; 70 restaurants) to a larger company, Pleasurama PLC. For Pleasurama, Earl acquired control of Hard Rock Cafe International (eastern rights company) from co-founder Isaac Tigrett then in 1989 named as chief executive of the company. At the end of 1989, Mecca Leisure acquired Pleasurama. Mecca was then purchased by the Rank Organisation in 1990. While expanding Hard Rock Cafe from seven to 20 locations over the next two years, Earl met Bryan Kestner, with whom he had a shared vision of music, movies, and sports transcending language and other barriers.

== History ==
Planet Hollywood was opened in late 1991 in New York City, at the base of two adjacent office buildings at 130 and 140 West 57th Street. Arnold Schwarzenegger, Sylvester Stallone, Bruce Willis, Demi Moore, and Whoopi Goldberg were some of the actors who became investors/promoters. By the next year, three more locations were opened: London, southern California, and Chicago. In 1993, the company opened two new locations, Washington, D.C., and Cancun, Mexico, while arranging leases for five new locations. Each new unit, opening with a gala event, generated nearly $15 million revenue in their first operational year.

With its success, the company continued its aggressive expansion plan in 1994 while turning its attention to developing more theme-restaurant concepts, one of which was the Official All Star Café, a sports version of Planet Hollywood. Given permission, they started recruiting professional sports figures and planning its stadium and home cuisine menu and planning its merchandise.

The brand's highest-grossing location unit was opened in Las Vegas in 1994 with double the usual seating to 500. This was followed later in the year by another 500 seat location at Walt Disney World.

With expansion operating smoothly, Earl started working on other area of growth in 1995. Construction on the All Star Café's first location in New York City began in August 1995 near the Planet Hollywood and opened on December 18, 1995. Development was started on a Marvel Comics-based restaurant concept and on a Planet Hollywood Squares television game show with King World and Roseanne Barr's production company based on the Hollywood Squares. With the success of the merchandise, stand alone retail stores, Planet Hollywood Superstores were opened around 1996.

=== Public corporation ===
As of the May 1996 IPO circular, the celebrities were only minor holders of stock with Earl and Barish owning 57.2 percent and a 24.2 percent stake owned by Ong Beng Seng. In April 1996, Planet Hollywood went public on the New York Stock Exchange at $18 a share. The company's share price reached an all-time high of $32 on the first day of trading; by 1999, it was down to less than $1. The company has gone bankrupt twice. In addition to going public, the company had MBNA issue Planet Hollywood VISA credit cards that gave cardholders priority restaurant seating. Planet Hollywood International and ITT Corporation formed a joint venture for Planet Hollywood casinos. The corporation and Marvel Entertainment Group agreed to launch the Marvel Mania comic book character-based restaurant concept. The company also had started to develop Chefs of the World concept, which would feature a "'star-studded' culinary staff".

The company planned to expand by 30 to 40 percent each year in annual revenue and the number of restaurant locations. Additional competitors also started up, including Country Star chain, Harley-Davidson Café, Robert De Niro's Tribeca Grill and Thunder Roadhouse. Some speculated that the company had thinned its resources too much, and, with the trend of novelty location visits dropping, store revenue would continue to drop.

In September 1997, Planet Hollywood International Inc. announced its Cool Planet Cafe ice-cream shop chain which would open 10 locations in 1998. ITT Corporation and Planet Hollywood were in discussion early September 1997 for a Planet Hollywood hotel near Times Square. The corporation then formed on September 24, 1997, a joint venture for an Official All Star Hotel.

In the fourth quarter of 1997, the company recorded a $40 million loss. Too much focus on diversification showed that the original chain was neglected with mediocre food, high menu prices and below average service. In early November 1998, Barish resigned as board chairman while retaining his board director post and filing to sell some of his company's stock. Earl replaced him as chairman. Barish was replaced by William Baumhauer as president. The franchise in Cape Town, South Africa, had a bomb attack in August 1998. $244 million in losses were recorded in 1998.

The first Marvel Mania opened in January 1998 near Universal Studios Hollywood. With MTV Networks, Planet Hollywood opened its first Sound Republic in London in mid-1998. In July 1999, the company started its Planet Movies by AMC. In August 1998, the first Cool Planet Cafe opened in Santa Monica, California.

In March 1999, Barish resigned as board director and sold shares that week. At a May 1999, shareholder's annual meeting, the company indicated that a delayed-payment agreement was in negotiation and that they were renovating some and are considering closing other outlets.

Causing little change on the company's net profit/loss line, Baumhauer resigned in June 1999, with the company having $359 million in debt on the books to return to his previous employer, Unique Casual Restaurants. By July 1999, Planet Hollywood had sold its Orlando HQ for cash and leased it back for 15 years. On October 12, 1999, the company filed for Chapter 11 bankruptcy in an attempt to reorganize. They closed or sold poorly performing Planet Hollywood restaurants and Official All Star Cafes. It moved to focus to its original theme concept, stopping operation of Planet Movies by AMC and sold its Sound Republic units.

Schwarzenegger severed his financial ties with the business in January 2000. Planet Hollywood exited Chapter 11 bankruptcy on May 9, 2000, with the approval of its reorganization plan. New celebrities were sought out for their restaurants while renewing relationships with early recruits. The plan included capital and debt restructuring including a cash infusion plus new products and improvements to decor and the menu. Planet's first website was launched with entertainment news and chat rooms. Earl, Prince Al-Waleed bin Talal and Ong Beng Seng had led restructuring plan which left the company with 35 locations, 25 of which were franchised.

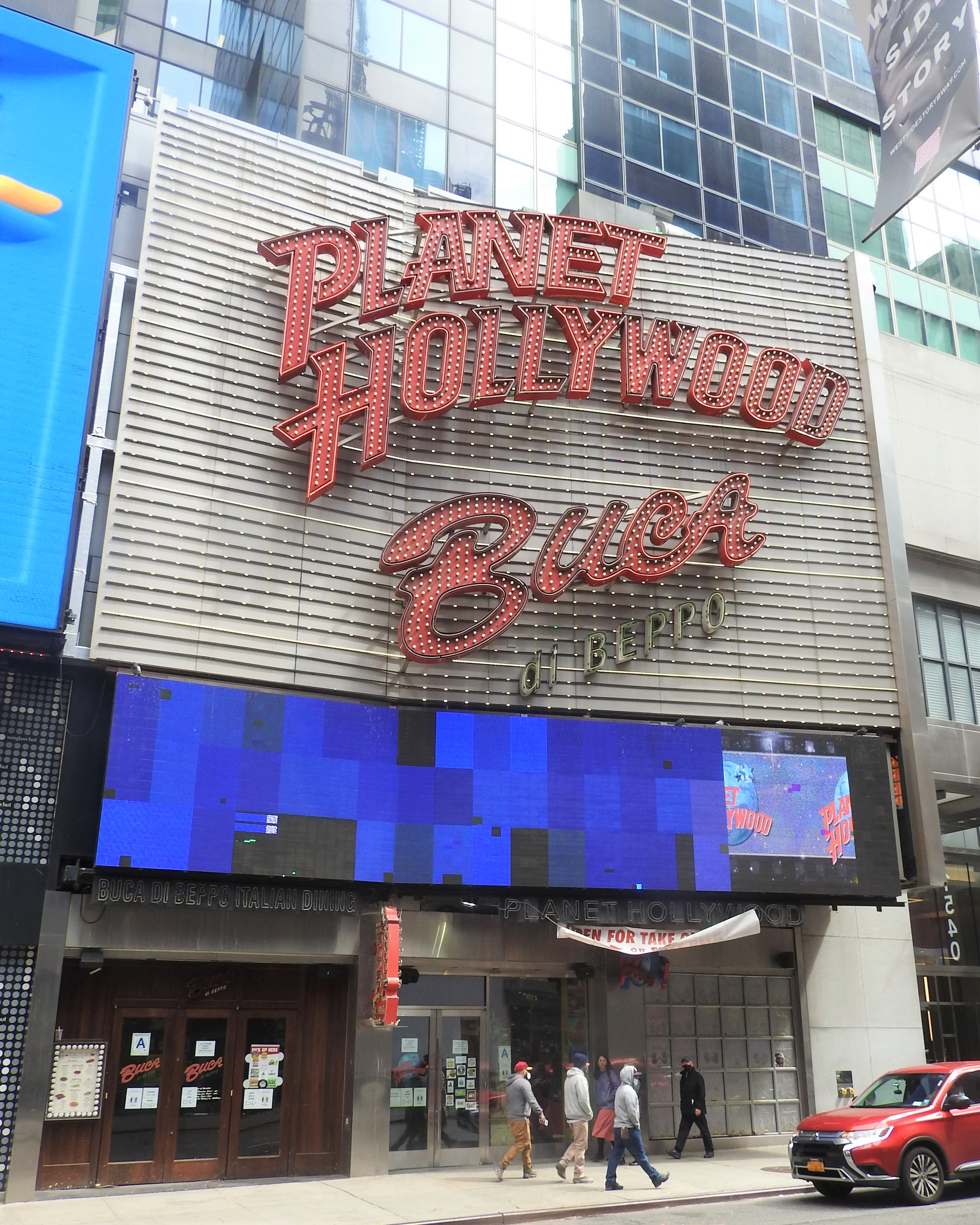
Planet Hollywood Buca, Times Square, 2021

Barred due to its bankruptcy, Planet Hollywood International had relisted in May 2000 on the NASDAQ. In September 2000, the Official All Star Cafe in Times Square was closed with the Planet Hollywood taking over its 600-seat location. While this All Star location was profitable, Planet Hollywood was more profitable. The company was also coming out of Chapter 11 bankruptcy.

In October 2001, Planet Hollywood International filed again for Chapter 11 bankruptcy. Blaming the economic slowdown from the September 11 attacks, the company had $135 million in debt.

In July 2010, Earl hired a CEO and president, David Crabtree, for Planet Hollywood and its parent company from Westgate Resorts. Planet Hollywood Resorts International, LLC signed on Wyndham Hotel Group to develop franchises for Planet Hollywood Resorts in September 2010.

In April 2022, Planet Hollywood announced plans to offer more than 60,000 of its memorabilia, including photographs and movie posters, as NFTs under MetaHollywood.

In May 2023, the Planet Hollywood Restaurant located in Las Vegas, at the Forum Shops at Caesars, was permanently closed. The restaurant had been located at the Forum Shops for 29 years. Planet Hollywood opened its original Forum Shops location in July 1994, and subsequently moved to the Forum Shops’ third floor terrace level in 2012. The Cafe Hollywood at Planet Hollywood hotel-casino remains open.

In April 2025, PB Restaurants, the operator of Planet Hollywood restaurants in Times Square and at Los Angeles International Airport, filed for Chapter 11 bankruptcy. That same month, Planet Hollywood permanently closed the LAX location, leaving 3 locations remaining. PB Restaurants plans to liquidate two of its assets, Planet Express, which operated the LAX location, and Times Square Buffet, which operated the Times Square location which closed back in 2021.

=== Buca di Beppo ===
In September 2008, Planet Hollywood International Inc. acquired Buca, Inc., the owner of the Buca di Beppo national restaurant chain.

=== Planet Hollywood bombing ===
In August 1998, the Planet Hollywood restaurant in Cape Town, South Africa, was the target of a terrorist bombing killing two people. The perpetrators of the bombing stated it was in retaliation for American air-raids conducted in Sudan and Afghanistan.

== Locations ==
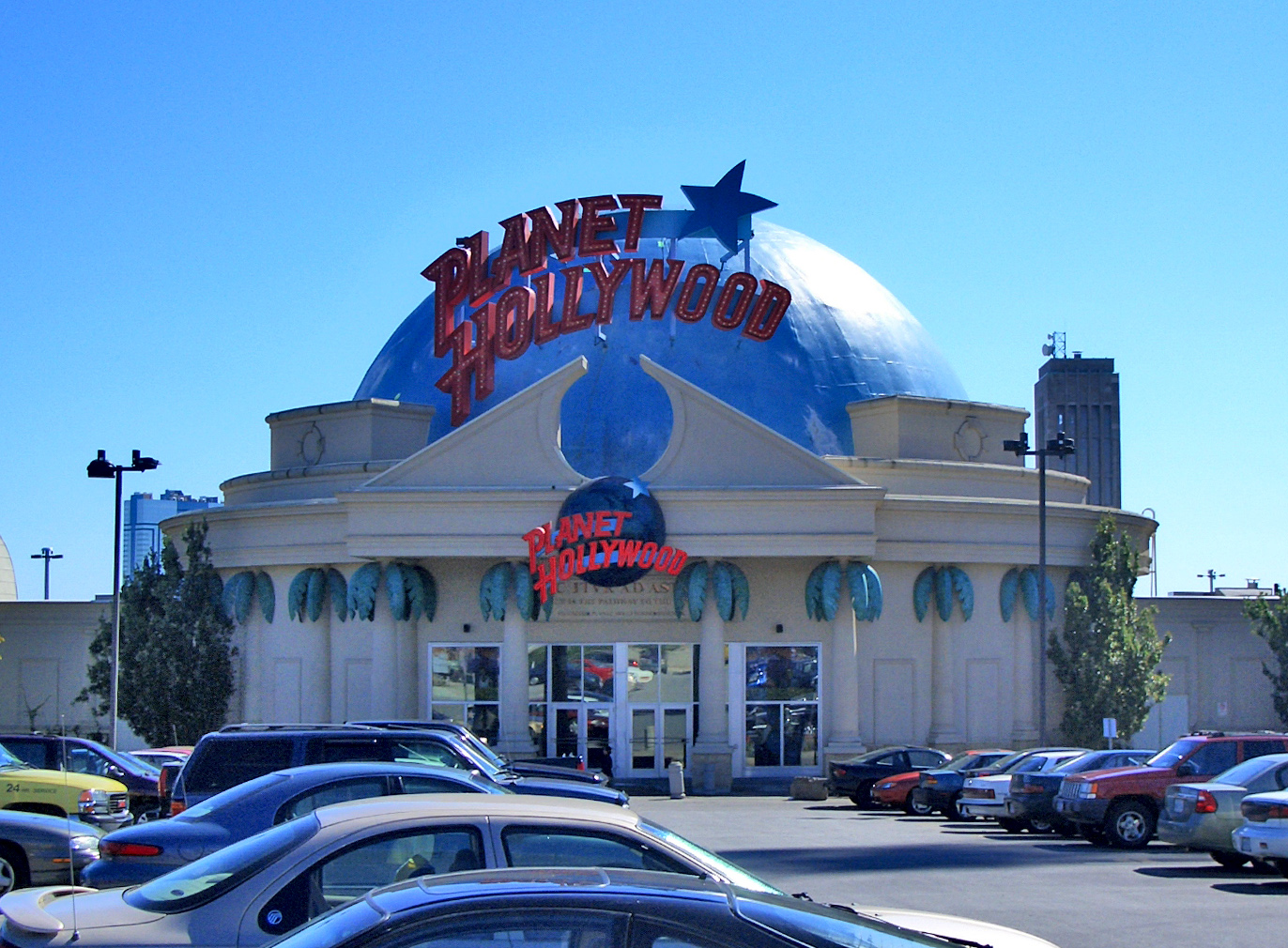
Planet Hollywood in Niagara Falls, Ontario (Closed 2017)

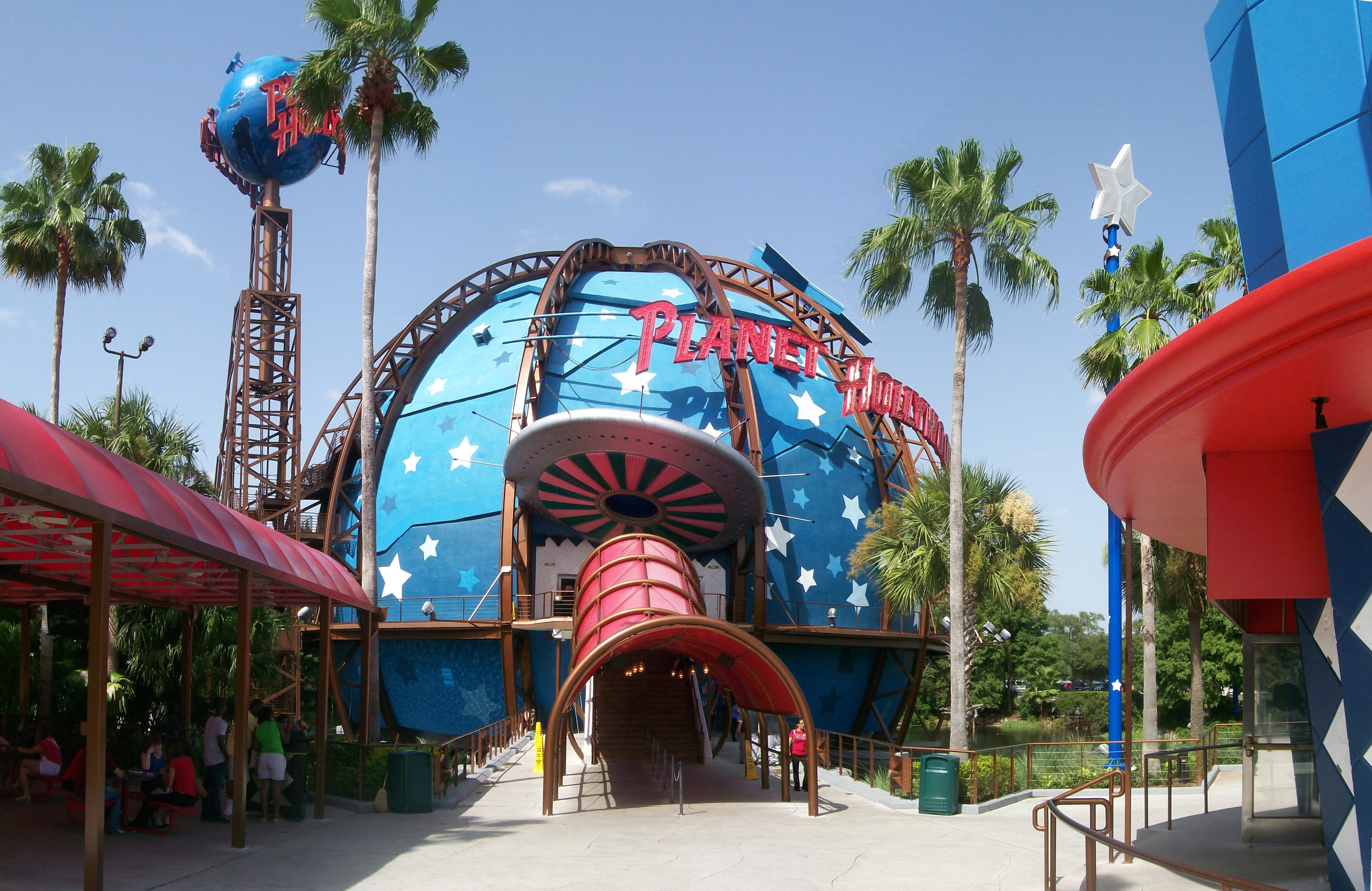
Planet Hollywood at Disney Springs in Orlando prior to remodel

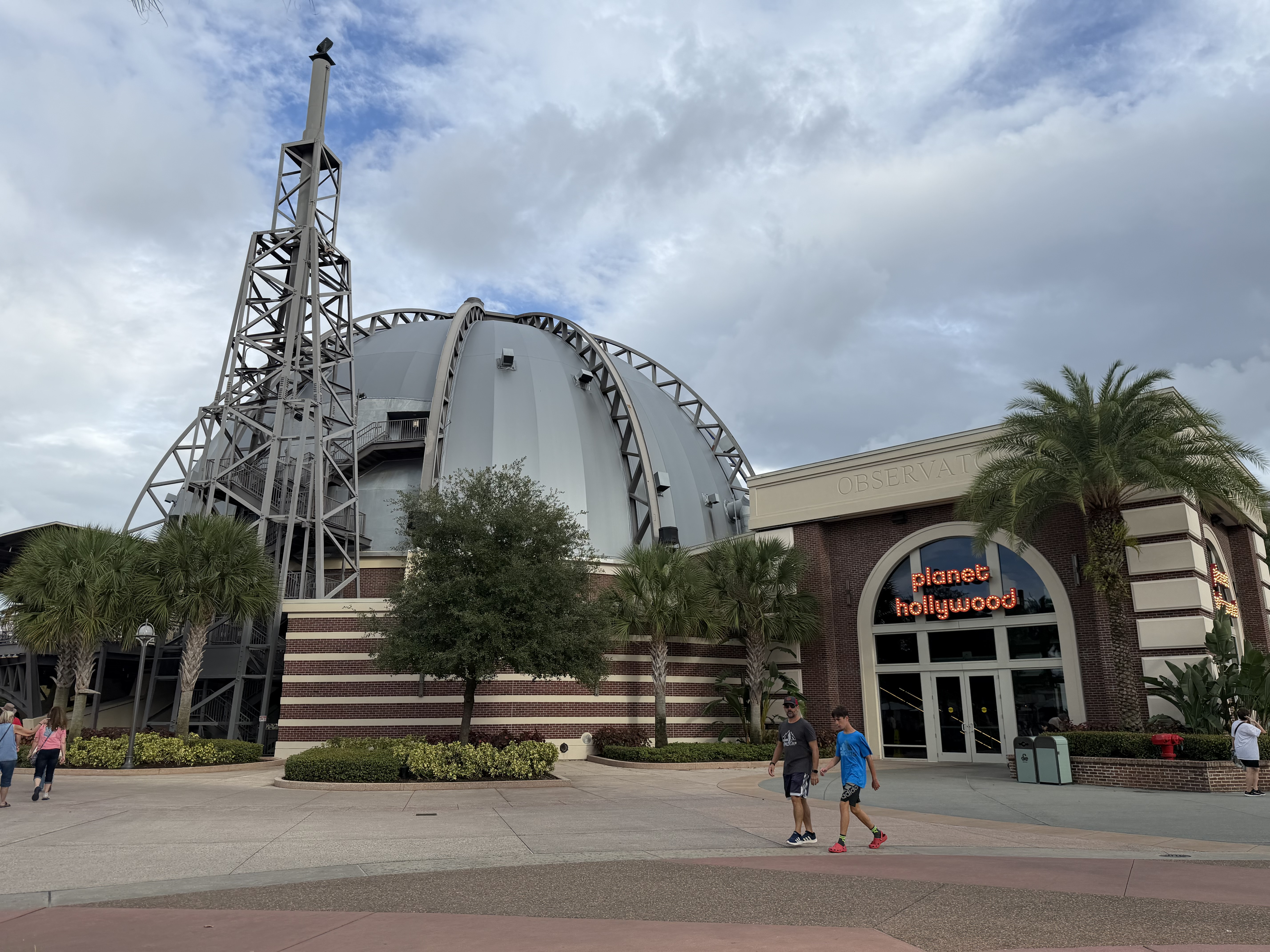
Planet Hollywood in Disney Springs following the remodel

As of March 2025, there are three restaurants and five hotels operating:

=== Restaurants with merchandise stores ===
- Orlando / Walt Disney World – Disney Springs (opened October 1994; renovation to Planet Hollywood Observatory, opened 2017)
- New York City – Times Square (opened February 3, 2025)
- Doha Oasis, Msheireb – Doha, Qatar (opened September 2, 2021)

=== Resorts ===
- Las Vegas – Planet Hollywood Resort & Casino, Las Vegas Strip (opened April 2007) – It had its grand opening the weekend of November 16, 2007, in the remodeled Aladdin Hotel & Casino. Planet Hollywood partnered with Westgate Resorts on the new Planet Hollywood Resort & Casino, connected to the existing resort, which opened on January 1, 2010. The 52-story luxury vacation ownership and condominium tower included over 1,200 1–4 bedroom units and a four-story penthouse of 28 luxury condominiums from 4,000 to 10,000 square feet (370 to 930 m^{2}). The building is a key subject in the documentary film The Queen of Versailles. The resort and casino were sold in 2010 to Caesars Entertainment, and the separate Towers project was sold to Centerbridge Partners' Resort Finance Associates in 2011.
- Cancún – Planet Hollywood Resort Cancun (opened January 29, 2021)
- Costa Rica – Planet Hollywood Beach Resort Costa Rica, Peninsula Papagayo (opened October 2018)
- Goa – Planet Hollywood Goa, Utorda Beach (opened October 2014)
- Thane – Planet Hollywood Thane City (opened November 6, 2022)

=== Former other concepts ===
- Official All Star Café (1995–2007)
- Chefs of the World – The company also had started to develop this concept around 1996, which would feature a "'star-studded' culinary staff".
- Marvel Mania restaurant (1998–1999) is a Marvel Comics themed restaurant planned to be expanded into a chain. The corporation and Marvel Entertainment Group agreed in 1996 to launch the Marvel Mania comic book character-based restaurant concept. The joint venture had an option on Times Square Theatre for a location that expired in December 1996. The first location opened in January 1998 near Universal Studios Hollywood with Marvel being a co-owner with Universal Studios Hollywood and Planet Hollywood. However, Planet Hollywood had financial problems due to expanding too quickly and had to close it.
- Planet Movies by AMC (July 1999–) movie multiplexes of 30 screens maximum in complexes with Planet Hollywood and All Star Cafe restaurants and Cool Planet ice cream parlors In May 1998, the corporation agreed to its first United Kingdom location for Planet Movies by AMC in Manchester.
- Sound Republic was a music-theme restaurant chain in a joint venture with MTV Networks. Some location would have concert halls (four out of six) and there would be recruit music celebrities. Sound Republic was announced by Planet Hollywood International on June 8, 1998, with plans to open six locations over two years with the first in London mid-1998. In the third quarter 1998, the second location was to open in New York City. London and New York City would have halls with 600- to 800-seat and 1,200- to 1,400-seat respectively. Of the next four, a location was slated for its joint venture hotel-casino in Las Vegas but none for Orlando.

=== Cool Planet Cafe ===
Cool Planet Cafe
- Type: Division
- Industry: Restaurant
- Fate: Closed
- Products: Cool Planet Ice Cream
- Owner: Planet Hollywood International
Planet Hollywood
Restaurant information
- Food type: Desserts

Cool Planet Cafe was a joint venture chain of ice cream shops owned by Planet Hollywood International with a movie theme. Host Marriott Services was a partner in developing an additional 10 locations in a joint venture with Planet Hollywood.

Cool Planet Ice Cream, which was launched alongside the ice cream shops, was made by Dreyer's and was available in grocery stores with flavors like Blue Berry-More and Die-Hard Chocolate.

Planet Hollywood International founded the Cool Planet Cafe in September 1997 and announced Whoopi Goldberg as the spokesperson for the chain as well as its private label Cool Planet Ice Cream. There were plans to open 10 locations in 1998, mostly in existing Marriott properties.

In August 1998, the first Cool Planet Cafe opened in the Third Street Promenade retail district of Santa Monica, California. At that time, the Host Marriott joint venture had scheduled five locations to be opened by July 1999 and two more by December 1999. Cool Planet branding is still used in the dessert section of the menus of Planet Hollywood restaurants.

== See also ==
- Bubba Gump Shrimp Company
- Buca di Beppo
- Rainforest Cafe
- Fashion Cafe
- Hard Rock Cafe
