= Brio Italian Grille and Bravo! Italian Kitchen =

American restaurant company

- Type: Private
- Traded as: Nasdaq: BBRG
- Industry: Restaurants
- Founded: 1992; 34 years ago
- Founders: Rick Doody and Chris Doody
- Fate: Chapter 11 bankruptcy
- Headquarters: Orlando, Florida
- Number of locations: 59
- Revenue: US$ 407 million (2017)
- Owner: Earl Enterprises
- Number of employees: 5,000-10,000
- Website: www.brioitalian.com www.bravoitalian.com

Brio Italian Grille and Bravo! Italian Kitchen (formerly known as Brio Tuscan Grille and Bravo! Cucina Italiana) are American upscale casual dining restaurant chains that specialize in Italian-American cuisine. Brio offers Northern Italian cuisine including bruschetta, pizza, pasta, steaks, seafood, soup and salad. Bravo! restaurants have a Roman ruin style décor and an open, Italian style kitchen focusing primarily on pastas and pizzas.

The chains were established in Columbus, Ohio as Bravo Development, Inc. (BDI) in 1992 by Rick and Chris Doody in collaboration with Executive Chef Phil Yandolino. The company then became Bravo Brio Restaurant Group in 2010 when it went public. In 2018, the company was sold to Spice Private Equity Ltd. and Brio Bravo Restaurant Group was rebranded as FoodFirst Global Restaurants, and is now based in Orlando, Florida. Steve Layt is the company's chief executive officer. As of 2023, both chains are now subsidiaries of Earl Enterprises.

== History ==
Bravo Development, Inc. (BDI) was founded in 1992 by Rick Doody, his brother Chris Doody, and Executive Chef Phil Yandolino. Initially, the restaurant group consisted of one brand, Bravo! Cucina Italiana. The first restaurant opened in Columbus, Ohio. Eventually, the restaurant group launched a second similar, but more upscale brand, Brio Tuscan Grille in Columbus as well.

In October 2010, BDI went public and became Bravo Brio Restaurant Group (BBRG). Their IPO raised net proceeds of $62.4 million.

On May 24, 2018, BBRG was sold to Spice Private Equity Ltd. and renamed FoodFirst Global Restaurants. BBRG sold for about $100 million and their shareholders received $4.05 per share in cash. At that moment, Bravo and Brio managed 110 stores in 32 states, for an estimated sales volume of around 400 million dollars.

On April 10, 2020, FoodFirst Global Holdings Inc. filed for voluntary Chapter 11 bankruptcy protection in the Middle District of Florida.

On June 12, 2020, Earl Enterprises acquired Brio and Bravo from FoodFirst Global Holdings. In 2025, Brio Bravo Restaurants filed for bankruptcy, marking the second time the two chains filed for bankruptcy. The company listed assets and liabilities between $50 million and $100 million, and owed Sysco $1.9 million. The company plans to shutter underperforming locations and stabilize itself in a better financial position.

Brio Italian Grille operates 25 restaurants as of 2025.

== Executive officers ==
- CEO – Steve Layt
- Chairman – Antonio Bonchristiano
- CFO – Brian Grusi
- Chief culinary officer – John Imbriolo

== Legal ==
In 2018, BBRG announced it had settled two lawsuits in 2017 for a total of $5.6 million. A class-action lawsuit filed in Missouri involved 8,000+ former and current employees and the company settled the case for $4 million. A class-action lawsuit filed in New York involved over 500 employees and the company settled the case for $1.6 million.
